= List of crossings of the Ohio River =

This is a complete list of current and former bridges and other crossings of the Ohio River from the mouth at the Mississippi River at Cairo, Illinois to the confluence of the Allegheny and Monongahela Rivers at Pittsburgh, Pennsylvania.

== Illinois–Kentucky ==
Image	Crossing	Carries	Location	Opened	Coordinates
	Cairo Ohio River Bridge	US 51 / US 60 / US 62	Cairo and Wickliffe	1937	36°59′39″N 89°08′45″W
	Cairo Rail Bridge	Canadian National Railway	Cairo and Wickliffe	1889,1952	37°01′23″N 89°10′32″W
	Olmsted Locks and Dam		Pulaski County, Illinois and Ballard County, Kentucky	2018	37°11′01″N 89°03′50″W
	Lock and Dam Number 53		Chestnut Hills Nature Preserve and Monkey's Eyebrow	1929 demolished 2020	
	Metropolis Bridge	Canadian National Railway (Illinois Central Railroad)	Metropolis and West Paducah	1917	37°08′42″N 88°44′31″W
	Interstate 24 Bridge	I-24	Metropolis and Paducah	1973	37°08′00″N 88°41′13″W
	Lock and Dam Number 52		Brookport and Paducah	1929 demolished 2020	
	Brookport Bridge	US 45	Brookport and Paducah	1929	37°06′50″N 88°37′45″W
	Smithland Locks and Dam		Hamletsburg and Smithland		37.167394°N 88.425519°W
	Lock and Dam No. 51		Golconda and Joy		
	Elizabethtown Ferry	KY 297	Elizabethtown and Tolu		
	Cave-in-Rock Ferry	IL 1 / KY 91	Cave-in-Rock and Ferry Shore		
	Lock and Dam No. 50		Cave-in-Rock and Ferry Shore		
	Shawneetown Bridge	IL 13 / KY 56	Old Shawneetown and Spring Grove	1955	37°41′28″N 88°07′53″W

== Indiana–Kentucky ==
Image	Crossing	Carries	Location	Opened	Coordinates
	John T. Myers Locks and Dam		Point Township and Uniontown	1977	37.79276°N 87.99158°W
	Uniontown Ferry		Point Township and Uniontown		
	Henderson Bridge (Ohio River)	CSX Transportation	Union Township and Henderson	1932	37°50′45″N 87°35′47″W
	Bi-State Vietnam Gold Star Bridges	US 41	Evansville and Henderson (crosses the river entirely within the state of Kentucky at this point)	1932, 1965	37°54′19″N 87°33′02″W
	Proposed Interstate 69 Bridge	I-69	Evansville and Henderson	N/A	37°54′19″N 87°30′00″W
	Newburgh Lock and Dam		Newburgh and Green River State Wildlife Area	1975	37.9294°N 87.3734°W
	Owensboro Bridge	SR 161 / KY 2262	Ohio Township and Owensboro	1940	37°46′45″N 87°06′33″W
	William H. Natcher Bridge	US 231	Ohio Township and Maceo	2002	37°54′03″N 87°02′01″W
	Bob Cummings Lincoln Trail Bridge	SR 237 / KY 69	Cannelton and Hawesville	1966	37°54′12″N 86°44′39″W
	Cannelton Locks and Dam	Ohio River	Troy Township and Skillman	1966	
	Matthew E. Welsh Bridge	SR 135 / KY 313	Mauckport and Brandenburg	1966	38°01′02″N 86°11′49″W
	Sherman Minton Bridge	I-64 / US 150	New Albany and Louisville	1962	38°16′44″N 85°49′21″W
	Kentucky & Indiana Terminal Bridge	Norfolk Southern Railway	New Albany and Louisville	1912	38°16′57″N 85°48′05″W
	McAlpine Locks and Dam (includes bridge to Shippingport Island, not all the way across river)		New Albany and Louisville	1830	38.278087°N 85.790408°W
	Fourteenth Street Bridge	Louisville and Indiana Railroad	Clarksville and Louisville	1868, 1919	38°16′05″N 85°45′59″W
	George Rogers Clark Memorial Bridge	US 31 (Pedestrian and automobile traffic)	Jeffersonville and Louisville	1929	38°15′49″N 85°45′06″W
	Spirit of Jefferson Ferry	Temporary ferry service due to closure of Sherman Minton Bridge; no longer used after the bridge reopened in February 2012.	Jeffersonville and Louisville		
	John F. Kennedy Memorial Bridge	I-65 (southbound traffic)	Jeffersonville and Louisville	1963	38°15′52″N 85°44′37″W
	Abraham Lincoln Bridge	I-65 (northbound traffic)	Jeffersonville and Louisville	2015	38°15′52″N 85°44′36″W
	Big Four Bridge	Pedestrian (Former Cleveland, Cincinnati, Chicago and St. Louis Railway line)	Jeffersonville and Louisville	1895, 1929	38°15′58″N 85°44′22″W
	Lewis and Clark Bridge	I-265 / KY 841	Utica Township and Louisville	2016	38°20′36″N 85°38′34″W
	Milton–Madison Bridge	US 421	Madison and Milton	1929, 2014	38°43′47″N 85°22′12″W
	Markland Dam Bridge	SR 101 / KY 1039	York Township and Warsaw	1964	38°46′36″N 84°57′52″W
	Rising Sun Ferry		Rising Sun and Rabbit Hash	2018	38°57′29″N 84°50′14″W
	Aurora–Petersburg Ferry - closed in 1978		Aurora and Petersburg		
	Carroll Lee Cropper Bridge	I-275	Lawrenceburg Township and West Petersburg	1977	39°06′12″N 84°49′31″W

== Ohio–Kentucky ==
Image	Crossing	Carries	Location	Opened	Coordinates
	Anderson Ferry		Delhi Township and Constance		39°04′26″N 84°37′30″W
	Cincinnati Southern Bridge	Norfolk Southern Railway	Cincinnati and Ludlow	1877, 1922	39°05′54″N 84°32′31″W
	Brent Spence Bridge	I-71 / I-75	Cincinnati and Covington	1963	39°05′29″N 84°31′21″W
	C&O Railroad Bridge	CSX Transportation Cincinnati Terminal	Cincinnati and Covington	1929	39°05′29″N 84°31′10″W
	Clay Wade Bailey Bridge	US 25 / US 42 / US 127	Cincinnati and Covington	1899, 1974	39°05′28″N 84°31′09″W
	John A. Roebling Suspension Bridge	KY 17	Cincinnati and Covington	1867	39°05′34″N 84°30′36″W
	Taylor–Southgate Bridge	US 27	Cincinnati and Newport	1995	39°05′46″N 84°30′05″W
	Newport Southbank Bridge (Purple People Bridge)	Pedestrian	Cincinnati and Newport	1872, 1897	39°05′53″N 84°29′52″W
	Daniel Carter Beard Bridge	I-471	Cincinnati and Newport	1976	39°06′01″N 84°29′41″W
	Combs–Hehl Bridge	I-275	Cincinnati and Highland Heights	1979	39°03′24″N 84°25′53″W
	Captain Anthony Meldahl Locks and Dam		Washington Township and Willow Grove	1964	38°47′35″N 84°10′18″W
	Augusta Ferry		Lewis Township and Augusta		38°46′50″N 84°0′39″W
	William H. Harsha Bridge	US 62 / US 68	Aberdeen and Maysville	2000	38°41′04″N 83°46′56″W
	Simon Kenton Memorial Bridge	US 62 Bus. / US 68 Bus.	Aberdeen and Maysville	1931	38°39′00″N 83°45′35″W
	Carl Perkins Bridge	US 23 Truck / KY 8S / SR 852	Portsmouth and South Portsmouth	1988	38°43′38″N 83°01′03″W
	U.S. Grant Bridge	US 23	Portsmouth and South Shore	2006	38°43′39″N 82°59′49″W
	Sciotoville Bridge	CSX Transportation	Sciotoville and Siloam (junction in) South Shore	1916	38°45′09″N 82°53′07″W
	Jesse Stuart Memorial Bridge over the Greenup Lock and Dam	SR 253	Green Township and Lloyd	1984	38°38′48″N 82°51′30″W
	Oakley C. Collins Memorial Bridge (New Ironton-Russell Bridge)		Ironton and Russell	2016	38°31′32″N 82°41′07″W
	Ben Williamson Memorial Bridge	SR 652 South	Coal Grove and Ashland	1932	38°29′05″N 82°38′26″W
	Simeon Willis Memorial Bridge	SR 652 North	Coal Grove and Ashland	1985	38°29′02″N 82°38′25″W

== Ohio–West Virginia ==
Image	Crossing	Carries	Location	Opened	Coordinates
	Norfolk Southern Bridge	Norfolk Southern Railway	South Point and Kenova	1913	38°24′19″N 82°34′24″W
	West Huntington Bridge	US 52	Union Township and Huntington	1970	38°24′47″N 82°29′11″W
	Robert C. Byrd Bridge	SR 527 / WV 527	Chesapeake and Huntington	1994	38°25′28″N 82°27′05″W
	Frank Gatski Memorial Bridge	SR 775 / WV 106	Proctorville and Huntington	1985	38°26′01″N 82°23′23″W
	Robert C. Byrd Lock and Dam		Clay Township and Gallipolis Ferry	1937	38°40′54″N 82°11′04″W
	Silver Memorial Bridge	US 35	Addison Township and Henderson	1969	38°50′04″N 82°08′51″W
	Point Pleasant Rail Bridge	Norfolk Southern Railway	Addison Township and Point Pleasant	1885, 1919	38°50′46″N 82°08′29″W
	Pomeroy–Mason Bridge	WV 62 Spur / SR 833	Pomeroy and Mason	2008	39°00′48″N 82°02′29″W
	Racine Lock and Dam		Letart Township and Letart	1971	
	Ravenswood Bridge	US 33	Lebanon Township and Ravenswood	1981	
	Belleville Lock and Dam		Olive Township and Belleville	1968	
	Blennerhassett Island Bridge	US 50	Belpre and Lubeck	2008	39°16′36″N 81°38′49″W
	Parkersburg–Belpre Bridge	SR 32 / WV 618	Belpre and Parkersburg	1980	
	Parkersburg CSX Bridge	CSX Transportation Marietta Subdivision	Belpre and Parkersburg	1871, 1905	
	Memorial Bridge		Belpre and Parkersburg	1954	39°17′00″N 81°33′47″W
	Williamstown Bridge	SR 60 / WV 31	Marietta and Williamstown	1992	39°24′30″N 81°26′52″W
	Marietta–Williamstown Interstate Bridge	I-77	Marietta and Williamstown	1967	39°24′11″N 81°25′52″W
	Willow Island Lock and Dam		Newport Township and Eureka Island	1976	
	Hi Carpenter Memorial Bridge	SR 807 / WV 807	Newport Township and St. Marys	1973	39°23′16″N 81°12′51″W
	Sistersville Ferry		Jackson Township and Sistersville		
	New Martinsville Bridge	SR 536 / WV 7	Ohio Township and New Martinsville	1961	39°39′33″N 80°51′48″W
	Hannibal Locks and Dam		Ohio Township and New Martinsville	1975	
	Moundsville Bridge	WV 2 Spur / SR 872	Mead Township and Moundsville	1986	39°54′48″N 80°45′15″W
	B & O Railroad Viaduct	CSX Baltimore and Ohio Railroad line	Bellaire and Benwood	1870	
	Bellaire Bridge (Closed, Demolition planned)		Bellaire and Benwood	1926 (closed 1991)	
	Vietnam Veterans Memorial Bridge	I-470	Brookside and Wheeling	1985	
	Wheeling Suspension Bridge (crosses main channel only)	WV 251	Wheeling Island (WV) and Wheeling (crosses the main channel entirely within the state of West Virginia)	1849	40°04′13″N 80°43′38″W
	Fort Henry Bridge	I-70 / US 40 / US 250	Bridgeport, Wheeling Island and Wheeling	1955	40°04′19″N 80°43′39″W
	Military Order of the Purple Heart Bridge (crosses back channel only)	US 40 / US 250	Bridgeport and Wheeling Island	1998	
	Aetnaville Bridge (crosses back channel only)	Pedestrian	Martin's Ferry and Wheeling Island	1891 (closed 1988)	
	Pike Island Locks and Dam		Yorkville and Clearview	1963	
	Wellsburg Bridge		Wellsburg and Brilliant	2023	40°15′22″N 80°38′12″W
	Wabash Bridge	CSX Pittsburgh and West Virginia Railway line	Mingo Junction and Follansbee	1904	
	Wheeling–Pittsburgh Steel Railroad Bridge	Wheeling and Lake Erie Railway	Steubenville and Coketown	1917	
	Market Street Bridge	WV 2 Spur	Steubenville and East Steubenville	1905	
	Steubenville Railroad Bridge	Norfolk Southern Railway	Steubenville and Weirton		
	Veterans Memorial Bridge	US 22	Steubenville and Weirton	1990	
	Fort Steuben Bridge	SR 822	Steubenville and Weirton	1928 (demolished 2012)	40.379824°N 80.613289°W
	New Cumberland Locks and Dam		Knox Township and New Cumberland	1961	
	Wayne Six Toll Bridge		East Liverpool and Newell	1905	
	Chester Bridge		East Liverpool and Chester	1897 (demolished 1970)	
	East Liverpool Railroad Bridge (abandoned)	Former Pittsburgh, Cincinnati, Chicago and St. Louis Railroad line	East Liverpool and Chester	1897 (demolished 1969)	
	Jennings Randolph Bridge	US 30	East Liverpool and Chester	1977	

== Pennsylvania ==
Image	Crossing	Carries	Location	Opened	Coordinates
	Shippingport Bridge	PA 168	Shippingport and Midland	1964	40°37′37″N 80°25′56″W
	Montgomery Locks and Dam		Shippingport and Industry	1936	
	Vanport Bridge	I-376	Potter Township and Vanport Township	1968	40°40′45″N 80°19′53″W
	Beaver Bridge	CSX Transportation Pittsburgh Subdivision	Monaca and Beaver	1910	40°41′35″N 80°17′27″W
	Rochester–Monaca Bridge	PA 18	Monaca and Rochester	1986	40°41′47″N 80°16′57″W
	Monaca–East Rochester Bridge	PA 51	Monaca and East Rochester	1959	40°41′32″N 80°16′02″W
	Ambridge–Aliquippa Bridge		Aliquippa and Ambridge	1926	40°35′32″N 80°14′11″W
	Dashields Locks and Dam		Moon Township and Edgeworth	1929	
	Sewickley Bridge	Orange Belt	Moon Township and Sewickley	1981	40°31′59″N 80°11′15″W
	Coraopolis Bridge (crosses back channel only)	Yellow Belt	Coraopolis and Neville Township	1995	40°30′58″N 80°09′07″W
	Neville Island Bridge	I-79	Robinson Township, Neville Township, and Glenfield	1976	40°30′56″N 80°08′03″W
	Emsworth Locks and Dam		Emsworth and Neville Township	1938	
	PC&Y Railroad Bridge (crosses back channel only)	Pittsburgh and Ohio Central Railroad	Stowe Township and Neville Township	1894	40°29′31.16″N 80°04′55.28″W
	Fleming Park Bridge (crosses back channel only)	Neville Rd, Fleming Park Rd; four lanes with divided sidewalk on upstream side	Stowe Township and Neville Township	1955	40°29′28″N 80°04′48″W
	McKees Rocks Bridge	SR 3104 / Blue Belt	McKees Rocks and Pittsburgh	1931	40°28′38″N 80°02′54″W
	Ohio Connecting Railroad Bridge	Norfolk Southern Railway Fort Wayne Line	Pittsburgh	1915	40°27′46″N 80°02′35″W
	West End Bridge	US 19	Pittsburgh	1932	40°26′46″N 80°01′37″W
Splits into Allegheny River and Monongahela River

The source of the Ohio River is at the confluence of the Allegheny River and the Monongahela River (40°26′31″N 80°00′50″W) at Pittsburgh, Pennsylvania.

== See also ==
- List of crossings of the Allegheny River
- List of crossings of the Cumberland River
- List of crossings of the Green River
- List of crossings of the Monongahela River
- List of crossings of the Tennessee River
- List of crossings of the Lower Mississippi River
- List of crossings of the Upper Mississippi River
