= Henderson Bridge =

Henderson Bridge may refer to:

- Henderson Bridge (Ohio River), rail bridge in Henderson, Kentucky
- Henderson Bridge (Rhode Island), connecting the cities of Providence and East Providence
- A nickname for the Bi-State Vietnam Gold Star Bridges that cross the Ohio River between Henderson, Kentucky and Evansville, Indiana
- The Henderson Street Bridge in Fort Worth, Texas, listed on the NRHP in Texas
