= John James Audubon Bridge =

John James Audubon Bridge may refer to:

- John James Audubon Bridge (Ohio River), former name of the northbound bridge
- John James Audubon Bridge (Mississippi River), a bridge in Louisiana, United States
