= Lyle Seeman =

Lyle E. Seeman
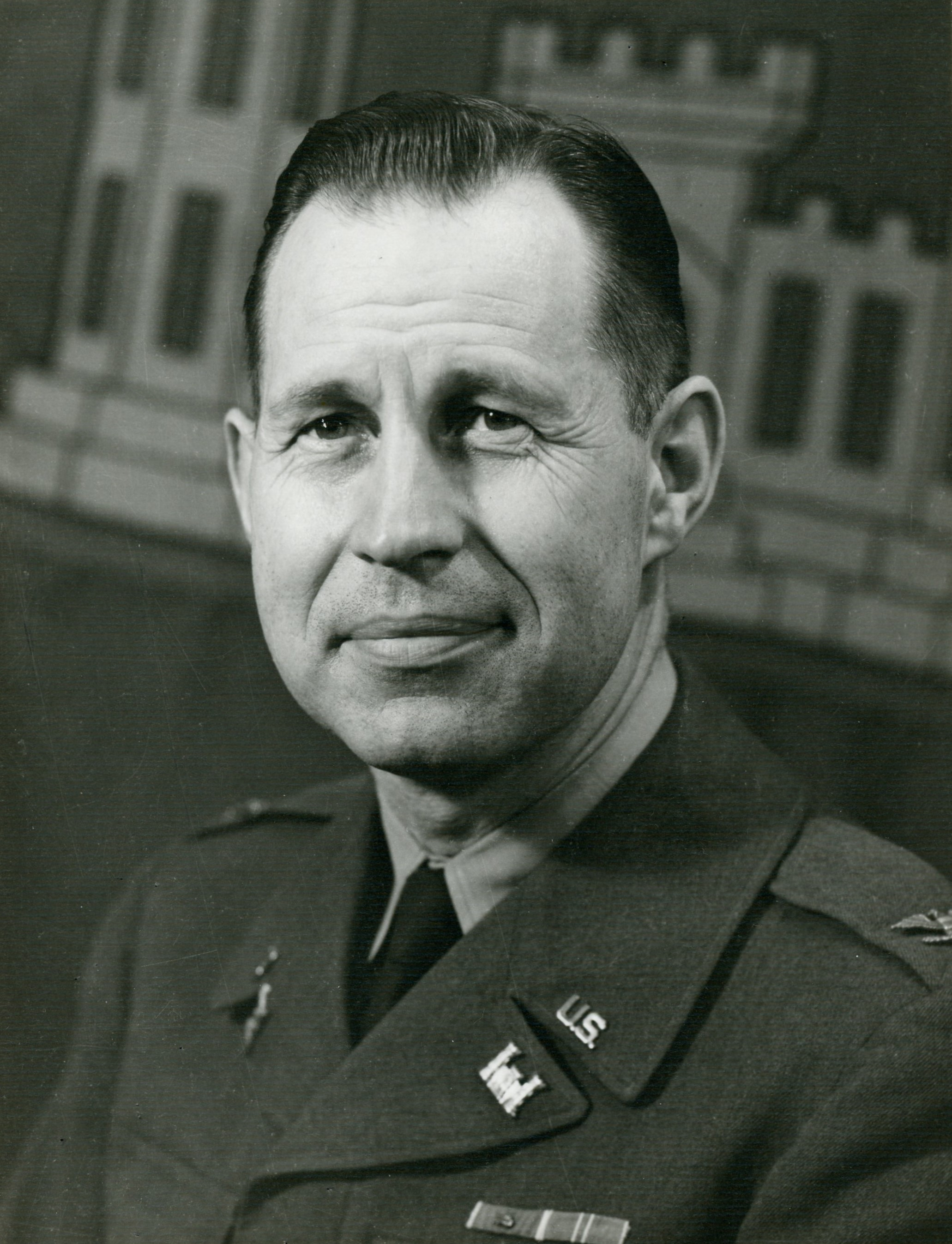
- portrait of Seeman as a colonel, circa 1950
- Born: 15 July 1906; Baraboo, Wisconsin, US
- Died: 31 December 1983 (aged 77); Arlington, Virginia, US
- Burial place: Arlington National Cemetery
- Education: United States Military Academy; Princeton University; National War College
- Military career
- Allegiance: United States of America
- Branch: United States Army
- Service years: 1928–1965
- Rank: Major General
- Nickname: Skip
- Service number: O-17082
- Conflicts: World War II; China Burma India theater
- Awards: Distinguished Service Medal; Legion of Merit (2); Bronze Star; Commendation Ribbon
- Football career

Profile
- Position: Guard

Career information
- College: Army Cadets

Lyle Edward Seeman (15 July 1906 – 31 December 1983) was an American general who was a military engineer, an administrator, and a commander. A 1928 graduate of the United States Military Academy, he played for the football team. He earned a graduate degree in civil engineering from Princeton University in 1934 and served with the U.S. Army Corps of Engineers detachment on the Nicaragua Canal Survey. During World War II, he commanded aviation engineer troops and served with the Tenth Air Force staff in the China Burma India Theater, supervising the construction of B-29 Superfortress bases in India for Operation Matterhorn. In the mid-1940s, he was involved with the Manhattan Project as administrator and commander of Los Alamos Laboratory and as an assistant to Leslie Groves. From 1947 to 1948, Seeman was detailed to the newly established Central Intelligence Agency, serving as Chief of the Nuclear Energy Group. He finished his career as commander of Fort Leonard Wood.

== Early life ==
Lyle Edward Seeman was born in Baraboo, Wisconsin, on 15 July 1906. He grew up in Janesville, Wisconsin, graduating from Janesville High School.

== Post-secondary education ==
portrait of Seeman from the 1928 West Point yearbook

Seeman attended a single year of college at the University of Wisconsin, before being appointed a cadet at the United States Military Academy (West Point). After graduating from West Point in 1928, he was commissioned to the United States Army Corps of Engineers. He obtained a graduate degree in 1934 from Princeton University in civil engineering, and later graduated from the National War College in 1953.

== West Point college football and lacrosse career ==
Photograph and illustration of Seeman playing for the 1926 Army Cadets football team

While at the United States Military Academy (USMA), Seeman played as a guard for the Army Cadets football team. Seeman's nickname while at USMA was "Skip".

Seeman was the starting right guard in the 1926 Army–Navy Game, a game which is considered the greatest Army–Navy Game and one of the greatest in the history of college football. Head Coach Biff Jones had made a heavily-scrutinized decision to start the game with a backfield starting roster featuring only second-string players. His strategy was to use his second team to tire-out Navy's first-string starters, before subbing-in his own first-string players. This meant that Army's starting lineup featured 7 string players, including the entirety of its backfield. Thus, despite Louis A. Hammack being widely anticipated to be Army's starter in the position, Seeman was instead started. Later into the game, Hammack was substituted-in for him.

In addition to football, Seeman was also a member of the lacrosse team. He rose to the captaincy of the team.

== Military career ==
=== Pre-war ===
Upon graduation from West Point on 9 June 1928, ranked tenth in his class, Seeman was commissioned as a second lieutenant in the United States Army Corps of Engineers. He was assigned as a student assistant to District Engineer, at Louisville, Kentucky, and was involved in the construction of Lock and Dam Number 53 over the Ohio River. From September 1928, to October 1929 he was assistant to the Division Engineer at St. Louis, Missouri. He was at Fort Riley, Kansas, assigned to the 9th Engineers, Mounted on 15 September 1930, and was promoted to a first lieutenant on 1 December 1933. He worked with the Nicaragua Canal Survey from 1935 to 1936, and from 1936 to 1940 he was assigned to ROTC work at Ohio State University. While working at Ohio State University, he was promoted to captain on 9 June 1938. He joined the 7th Engineer Battalion at Fort Knox, Kentucky, on 1 June 1940, and was promoted to major (United States) on 14 February 1941. From February 1941 to 10 April 1941, he

=== World War II and Manhattan Project ===
During World War II, Seeman was assigned to the Engineer Research and Development Laboratory at Fort Belvoir in Virginia, working as a regimental commander of the 934th Aviation Engineer Regiment. He was promoted to lieutenant colonel on 1 February 1942 and to colonel on 21 May 1943. In July 1943, he was assigned to the staff of the Tenth Air Force in China Burma India theater. For this service he was awarded the Legion of Merit and the Bronze Star Medal

military portrait of Seeman

On 3 May 1945, Major General Leslie R. Groves appointed Seeman to serve as his Army Corps of Engineers liaison at the Manhattan Project's Los Alamos Laboratory in New Mexico. As Groves' liaison, he contributed to managing efficiency at the laboratory in preparation for the Trinity test and for weapons manufacturing. On 7 August 1945, J. Robert Oppenheimer appointed him administrator of the laboratory.

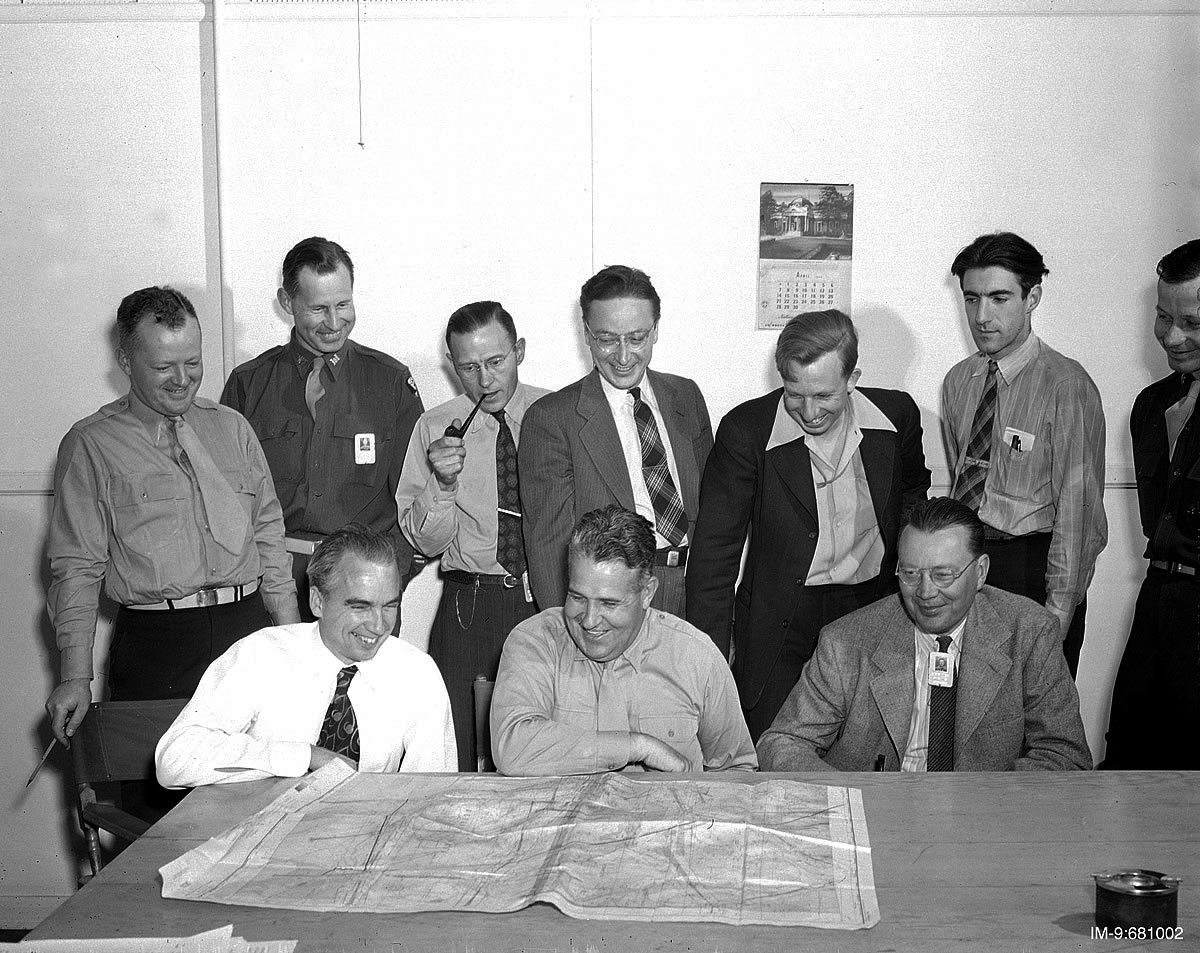
Lyle (back row, second from left) joins other officials in April 1947 in reviewing a map related to facility construction at Los Alamos National Laboratory

During the planning for the cancelled Operation Downfall operation, Seeman reported (in response to a query about the possibility of using tactical nuclear weapons on the Japanese mainland if Japan did not surrender after the atomic bombings of Hiroshima and Nagasaki) that at least seven Fat Man-type plutonium implosion bombs would be available by X-Day, which could be dropped on Japan's defending forces. He advised that American troops not enter an area hit by a bomb for "at least 48 hours". The risk of nuclear fallout was not well understood at the time, and this short time after detonation would have in actuality exposed American troops to substantial levels of radiation.

In September 1945, Seeman was made officer in charge for improvements and construction at Sandia Base. On October 31, 1945, he was appointed the Associate Director under Norris Bradbury (the Los Alamos Lab Director), and was made an Area Engineer responsible for the Sandia Z Division's Group Z-2 weapons assembly factory. He worked in this assignment until March 1946. In November 1945, he was made post commander at Los Alamos, a role he held until approximately September 1946. That same year, he also began working again as an aide to Groves. He witnessed the Operation Crossroads tests in the Bikini Atoll, and reported back to Groves with observations. He was designated by Groves as his representative to the National Park Service for meetings on the establishment of a monument at the site of the Trinity test. For his service with the Manhattan Project, he was awarded an oak leaf cluster to his Legion of Merit and a Commendation Ribbon.

=== Post-war ===
From 1947 to 1948, Seeman was detailed to the Central Intelligence Group and the newly established Central Intelligence Agency, serving as Chief of the Nuclear Energy Group. Between 1949 and 1952, he was the district engineer of the Army Corps of Engineers for the Alaska District. He oversaw the largest program of permanent construction that had ever been undertaken in Alaska up to that time. After graduating from the National War College, Seeman was assigned to the Office of the Comptroller of the Army from 1953 to 1954.

portrait of Seeman as Commanding General of Fort Leonard Wood (1960s)

On September 1, 1954, Seeman was appointed division engineer for the Southwestern Division of the Army Corps' Southwestern Division, headquartered in Dallas, Texas. He held this assignment until 1958. During this assignment, he additionally served as a member of the Mississippi River Commission and the Board of Engineers for Rivers and Harbors. He was promoted to brigadier general on July 14, 1955. On 1 May 1958, Seeman was assigned to work as the chief of the construction division within the Office of the Deputy Chief of Staff for Logistics. On 1 August 1958, he was designated Director of Installations, a role he held until May 1962. While in this role, he was promoted to major general on March 10, 1959. Seeman assumed the position of commander of Fort Leonard Wood in Missouri on May 20, 1962. He retired from the military on 30 May 1965.

== Personal life and death ==
Seeman married Marjorie Roberta Korp in 1929. Together, the Seemans had three children, daughters Diane (born 1936 in Nicaragua), Nancy (born in 1938 in Ohio), and Charlotte (born in 1943 in Tennessee).

Seeman died from a heart ailment on 31 December 1983 at his home in Arlington, Virginia at the age of 77. He was interred at Arlington National Cemetery.

== Military decorations ==
- Legion of Merit award for service during World War II (awarded on 2 October 1945)
- Legion of Merit award with Oak Leaf Cluster for service during peacetime
- Bronze Star Medal
- Army Distinguished Service Medal for service during the Cold War (awarded on 27 October 1965)

== Society memberships ==
Seeman was a member of the American Society of Civil Engineers and the Society of American Military Engineers.

== Dates of rank ==
Insignia	Rank	Component	Date	Reference
No pin insignia at the time	Second lieutenant	Corps of Engineers	8 June 1928	
	First lieutenant	Corps of Engineers	1 December 1933	
	Captain	Corps of Engineers	9 June 1938	
	Major	Army of the United States	14 February 1941	
	Lieutenant colonel	Army of the United States	1 February 1942	
	Colonel	Army of the United States	21 May 1943	
	Brigadier general	Regular Army	14 July 1955	
	Major general	Regular Army	10 March 1959	
