= I-69 Ohio River Crossing =

Proposed highway bridge in United States

- Coordinates: 37°54′16″N 87°31′10″W
- Carries: I-69
- Crosses: Ohio River
- Locale: On the Indiana-Kentucky border between Evansville, Indiana and Henderson, Kentucky
- Owner: INDOT; KYTC
- Website: i69ohiorivercrossing.com

History
- Construction cost: ~$1.5 billion

Location
- Interactive map of I-69 Ohio River Crossing

The I-69 Ohio River Crossing (I-69 ORX) is a planned bridge to carry the planned Interstate 69 (I-69) extension over the Ohio River between Evansville, Indiana, and Henderson, Kentucky. The bridge and its approach roadways make up a portion of Segment of Independent Utility 4 (SIU 4) of the I-69 corridor from Michigan to Texas. It will be built approximately 1.62 miles (2.61 km) upstream of the existing Bi-State Vietnam Gold Star Bridges carrying U.S. Route 41 (US 41), and at a point just downstream from where the Green River flows into the Ohio.

== Description ==
The I-69 ORX will be constructed about 1.62 miles (2.61 km) east (upstream) of the existing US 41 Bi-State Vietnam Gold Star Bridges linking Evansville, Indiana, with Henderson, Kentucky. The northern approach to the bridge will tie into the existing I-69 in Indiana (formerly I-164) freeway between Green River Road and Weinbach Avenue along Evansville's southeast side. On the Kentucky side, the southern approach is planned to tie into I-69 in Kentucky (formerly the Pennyrile Parkway) at the interchange with the Henderson Bypass (US 41/KY 425). No interchanges are planned on the Indiana approach, which will largely consist of a 2-3 mile long causeway across the floodplain, while interchanges with the Audubon Parkway and US 60 are planned on the Kentucky approach. The I-69 ORX project has been divided into three sections:

- Section 1: From the current northern terminus of I-69 in Kentucky at the I-69/US 41/KY 425 interchange south of Henderson to US-60 east of Henderson. This section will incorporate approximately 3 miles of the US-41 freeway (Pennyrile Parkway) from the I-69/KY-425 interchange to a point north of the KY-351 interchange, plus new terrain alignment from US-41 north of the KY-351 interchange to US-60. Incorporates the existing US-41/Audubon Parkway (Future I-x69 Spur) interchange. This section has been funded by the State of Kentucky; construction began in 2022, with this segment opening to traffic on November 8, 2025, with the section between US 41 and US 60 being temporarily designated as KY 3690.
- Section 2: From US-60 east of Henderson, Kentucky, to the Kentucky/Indiana state line (the state line lies about one-half mile (800 meters) north of the Ohio River in this area due to changes in the river's course over time). Includes a new 4-lane toll bridge across the Ohio River. Kentucky and Indiana are developing a funding plan that will include a mix of tolls, state, and federal funds. Construction is scheduled to begin in 2027 with an opening scheduled for 2031, but may be accelerated if funding is secured sooner.
- Section 3: From the Indiana/Kentucky state line to the existing I-69 east of Evansville, Indiana. A new high-speed interchange will be constructed to connect the ORX approach to the existing I-69. The existing I-69 west of this interchange to US-41 will become an extension of Veterans Memorial Parkway. Indiana has committed $200 million to begin construction in 2024, with completion scheduled for 2026. On November 1, 2023, INDOT awarded a $202 million construction contract to ORX Constructors, a joint-venture between Walsh Construction and Traylor Bros., Inc. for Section 3.

== Current status ==
=== Kentucky approach ===
On June 22, 2022, Kentucky Governor Andy Beshear, Kentucky Transportation Cabinet Secretary Jim Gray, Henderson Mayor Steve Austin, Henderson County Judge/Executive Brad Schneider, and Evansville, Indiana, Mayor Lloyd Winnecke broke ground for Phase One of the ORX project. I-69 ORX Section 1 focuses on improvements in Henderson and extends from KY 425 to US 60. It included an extension of over six miles of I-69, new interchanges with US 41 and US 60, and a reconstructed KY 351 interchange. The Kentucky Transportation Cabinet (KYTC) oversaw the Section 1 project with construction beginning in earnest in mid-2022 and continuing through 2025. This segment was opened to traffic on November 8, 2025.

=== Future plans ===
I-69 ORX Section 2 is a bistate project between Indiana and Kentucky that will complete the I-69 connection from US 60 in Henderson to I-69 in Evansville, which includes the new river crossing. Approval of preliminary development from both states came in March 2023. Design is expected to begin in 2025, with construction anticipated to begin in 2027 and continue through 2031 at an estimated cost of more than $1.2 billion. Both states continue to look for opportunities to accelerate that timeline. I-69 ORX Section 3 is the bridge approach construction in Indiana. Design work and preconstruction activities are underway. The Indiana Department of Transportation is overseeing this section, and construction is expected to begin in 2024 and end in 2027. In August 2023, Indiana and Kentucky officials announced that they had requested $630 million in funding from the federal government to complete the bridge and the road segments leading up to it. Letting for section 3 in Indiana began on November 1, 2023; on November 21, 2023, the state awarded a nearly $202 million contract to ORX Constructors to build their approach bridges and roadway. Construction will begin by 2025 with its completion now set for 2026. If the federal grant is approved, construction on a four-lane bridge could begin as soon as 2027 and be completed by 2031.

== History ==
=== Progress stalls due to funding issues ===
Environmental studies were initiated in 2001, and a draft environmental impact statement (DEIS) was issued in March 2004. Environmental studies were suspended when no funding source was identified to build the bridge, which is estimated to cost $1.4 billion. Kentucky is responsible for financing two-thirds (approx. $933.3 million) of the construction cost, and Indiana will finance the remaining third (approx. $466.6 million). Indiana has funding available for its portion of the project through the state's Major Moves program, but Kentucky has yet to identify a dedicated funding source for its portion of the cost.

The I-69 bridge had been competing for funding against other Ohio River bridge projects that Kentucky is attempting to complete, most notably the recently completed Ohio River Bridges Project between Louisville and southern Indiana, and the proposed Brent Spence Bridge replacement project between Covington and Cincinnati, Ohio. As a matter of historical antecedence the Ohio River boundary of lands that now constitute Kentucky is founded not upon the thalweg but is set by the precedence of royal proclamations and treaties to be the river's low-water point on north or west bank of the Ohio River, an alignment that precedes the Northwest Ordnance. Because of this, the fiscal burden of construction of infrastructure projects as between Kentucky and her Ohio River boundary-sister states (i.e., in the construction of bridges), falls primarily upon Kentucky alone. However, unlike the Twin Bridges, this bridge will be at least 40% in its entirety within the boundaries of Indiana.

The Kentucky Legislature passed House Bill 3 in 2008 that authorizes the state to establish joint bridge authorities with Indiana to finance and build crossings of the Ohio River, specifically with these three megaprojects in mind. While a joint authority has been established to advance work on the Louisville bridges, Kentucky officials have opted to wait on establishing a similar authority for the I-69 bridge until construction on the Louisville bridges is underway.

=== Renewed effort to complete ===
With the completion of SIU 5 in Kentucky in 2015, and with I-69 connected to Indianapolis via State Road 37 (SR 37) in Indiana (also in 2015), both states have made completing the Ohio River Crossing a top priority. On June 30, 2016, Indiana Governor Mike Pence (succeeded by Eric Holcomb) and Kentucky Governor Matt Bevin (succeeded by Andy Beshear) announced an agreement to resume environmental studies and develop a funding strategy to complete the Ohio River Bridge and its approaches. Indiana will contribute $17 million to restart and lead the environmental studies that will culminate in an approved environmental impact statement (EIS) and record of decision (ROD) that will allow construction to begin. Environmental studies are expected to take about three years to complete, with right-of-way acquisition and construction expected to begin thereafter. Kentucky has committed over $43 million in its 2016 Six-Year Highway Plan for design and right-of-way acquisition for the bridge. Revisions to the Ohio River Bridge concept have helped reduce its estimated cost from the initial estimate of $1.4 billion to $845 million. Both states are considering a combination of tolls, private sector investment, and traditional funding sources to finance construction of the bridge. On November 16, 2016, INDOT and KYTC announced the selection of Parsons Corporation of Pasadena, California to complete environmental studies and design of the I-69 Ohio River Bridge. Parsons recently led the engineering and design work for the Ohio River Bridges Project between Louisville, Kentucky and southern Indiana. The Federal Highway Administration released the Final Environmental Impact Statement (FEIS) and Record of Decision (ROD) approving Central Alternative 1B Modified that includes a 4-lane tolled bridge for I-69 and the retention of one of the US-41 bridges, toll free, for local traffic. With the completed FEIS and ROD, construction started on Section 1 between the I-69/US-41/KY-425 interchange and US-60 in June 2022.

The DEIS for the Ohio River Crossing was published on December 14, 2018, which selected Central Corridor 1 as the preferred alternative. The estimated cost to complete the segment is around $1.5 billion, which will be at least partially funded with tolls. The final EIS and ROD was released in 2021.

=== Funding proposed ===
Kentucky Governor Andy Beshear had proposed $267 million in funding for the bridge: $77 million from 2020 to 2022 and the rest from 2023 to 2026. A portion of the approach roadways would be built: from Kentucky Route 425 or the Henderson Bypass to US 60. The Kentucky General Assembly approved $37 million in Fiscal Years 2020 through 2022 for design, right-of-way, utility relocation, and initial construction between KY-425 and US-60, which includes reconfiguring the US-41 interchange with the Audubon Parkway. The approved amount is much less than what was originally proposed due to budget shortfalls stemming from the economic disruption caused by the COVID-19 outbreak in 2020. Kentucky's enacted six Year Road Plan includes $190 million for construction between KY-425 and US-60 in Fiscal Years 2023 through 2026, as well as $73.4 million to advance work on the bridge itself ($50 million in FY-2023 to complete the design, and 43.4 million in FY-2025 and 2026 for right-of-way acquisition and utility relocation). On May 14, 2020, the Evansville Metropolitan Planning Organization approved an additional $15 million that will enable INDOT and KYTC to complete environmental studies and begin preliminary design. Additionally, Indiana has programmed $4 million in FY 2020–2022 to acquire right-of-way for the northern approach to the bridge. On June 11, 2021, Indiana Governor Eric Holcomb announced his state has committed an additional $200 million to complete design and construction of the Indiana approach to the I-69 Ohio River Bridge, including a new high-speed interchange with the existing I-69 east of Evansville, and 1.5 miles of new freeway to the Kentucky state line (which lies about a half-mile (0.8 km) to the north of the Ohio River in the area due to changes in the river's course over time). Tolls are expected to cover between $250 million and $500 million of the bridge's construction cost, depending on the alternative selected.

=== Controversy over the future of the US 41 bridges ===
A major sticking point that has slowed progress on the final Environmental impact statement (FEIS) for the I-69 ORX is the future of the US 41 bridges following completion of the I-69 ORX. Kentucky officials favor reducing the US 41 bridges from two to one, which would be toll-free for local traffic. Residents and local officials in Henderson and Evansville favor keeping both US 41 bridges without tolls, but state officials have stated that it would not be financially viable to maintain both US 41 bridges without tolls after the I-69 ORX is built. Both states also want to avoid a situation where the US 41 bridges become a toll free alternative for long-distance traffic.

== See also ==
- List of crossings of the Ohio River
- Henderson Bridge: a nearby rail bridge over the Ohio River
