= Carl Perkins Bridge =

Bridge over the Ohio River

Carl D. Perkins Bridge
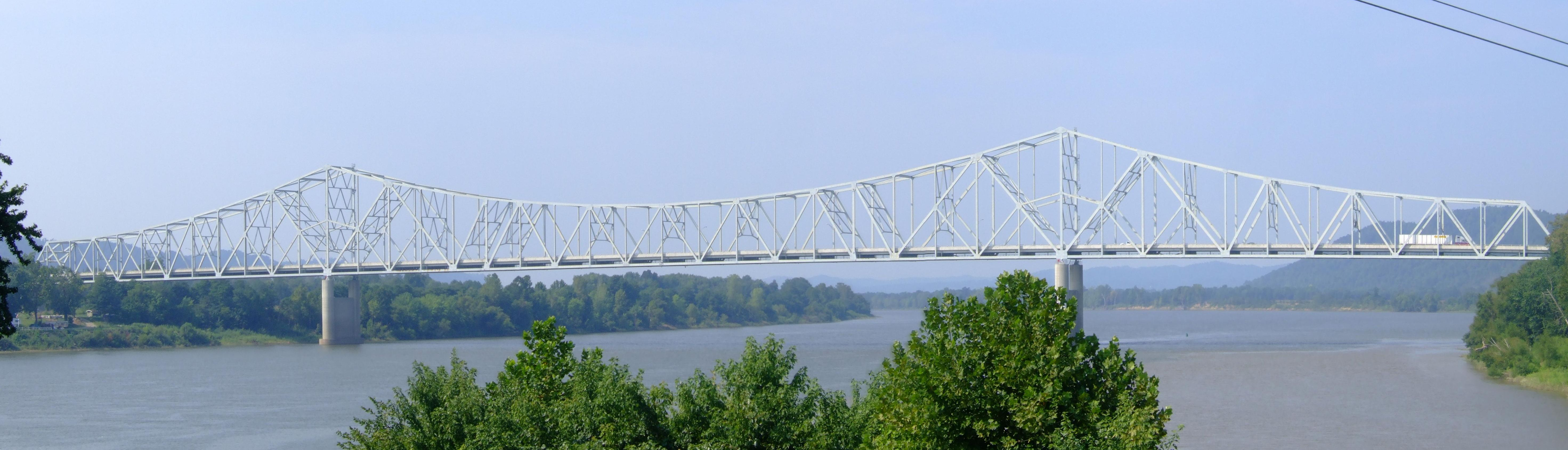
- Coordinates: 38°43′40″N 83°01′04″W
- Carries: 2 lanes of US 23 Truck / SR 852
- Crosses: Ohio River
- Locale: Portsmouth, Ohio and South Portsmouth, Kentucky
- Maintained by: Kentucky Transportation Cabinet

Characteristics
- Design: Cantilever bridge
- Longest span: 900 ft (270 m)

History
- Opened: October 30, 1987

The Carl D. Perkins Bridge is a cantilever bridge that spans the Ohio River between Washington Township, Scioto County, Ohio and South Portsmouth, Greenup County, Kentucky. The bridge carries the two lanes of State Route 852 and Truck Route U.S. Highway 23. The bridge connects to Kentucky Route 8.

== History ==
In July 1978, inspections of the original U.S. Grant Bridge found serious deterioration in its suspension cables. The bridge was closed to traffic and was rehabilitated over an 18-month period. With future traffic projected to increase compounded with a decline in level of service on the original U.S. Grant Bridge, the Kentucky Department of Transportation (KYDOT) and the Ohio Department of Transportation (ODOT) agreed to begin planning for a new bridge. The 1978 Surface Transportation Assistance Act authorized the construction of a new bridge across the Ohio River in Portsmouth. In the environmental impact statement, it was decided the new bridge would be located 1.1 miles (1.8 km) downstream from the U.S. Grant Bridge.

The bridge opened on October 30, 1987. It is named after the late Carl D. Perkins, Congressman from the 7th District of Kentucky.

During the demolition of the original U.S. Grant Bridge and the construction of its replacement upstream, it was the only highway bridge connecting Ohio to Kentucky at Portsmouth. The Perkins Bridge also served as a detour for U.S. Highway 23 during this time period.

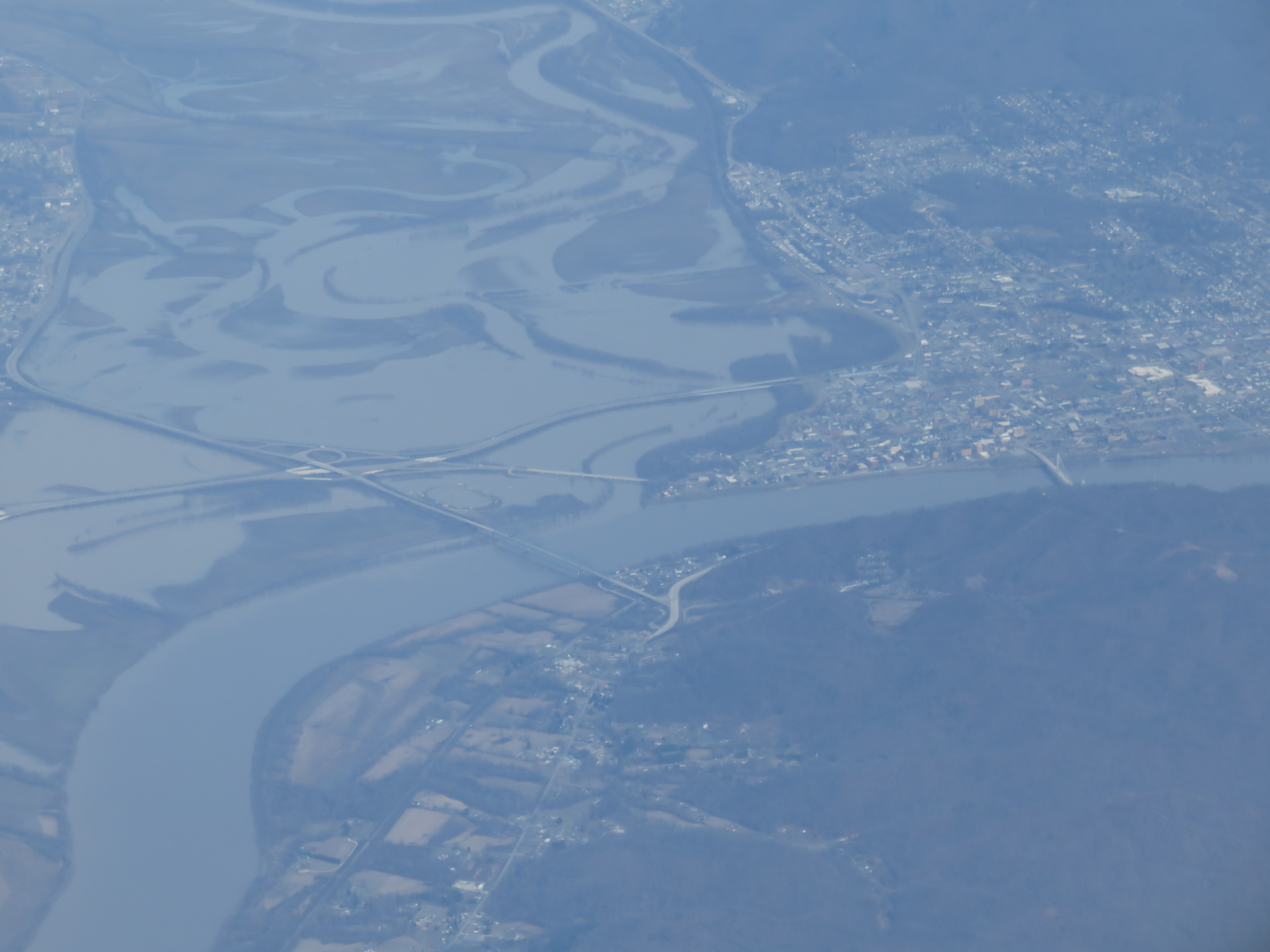
Aerial view of the bridge in 2019

== See also ==
- List of crossings of the Ohio River
