= Jesse Stuart Memorial Bridge =

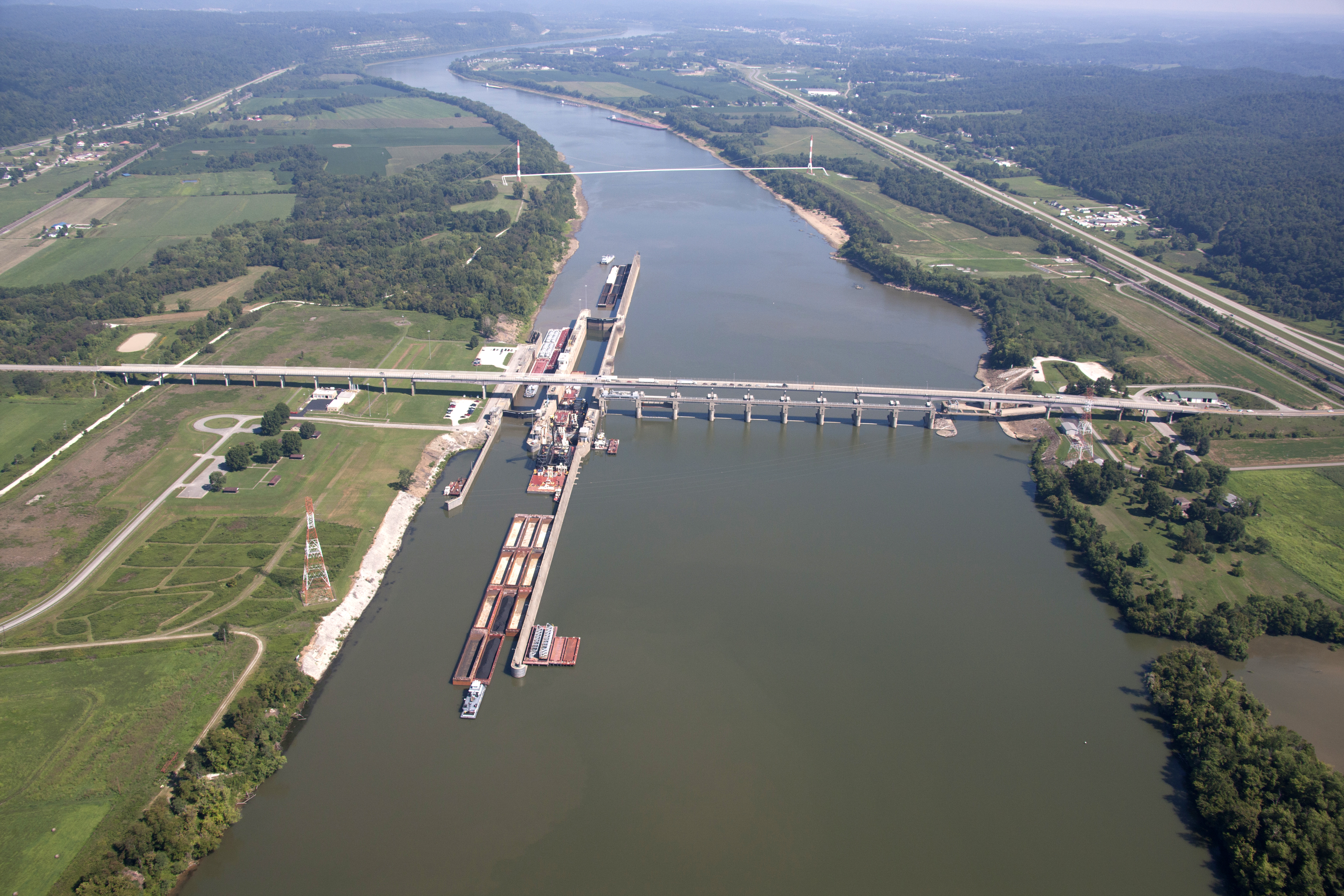
- Aerial view of Jesse Stuart Memorial Bridge and Greenup Lock & Dam
- Coordinates: 38.64658°N 82.85879°W
- Carries: 2 lanes of SR 253 (Ohio); 2 lanes of KY 10 (Kentucky)
- Crosses: Ohio River
- Locale: Green Township, Ohio and Lloyd, Kentucky, United States
- Maintained by: Kentucky Transportation Cabinet

Characteristics
- Design: Viaduct

History
- Opened: 1984

Location
- Interactive map of Jesse Stuart Memorial Bridge

The Jesse Stuart Memorial Bridge is a viaduct bridge on top of the Greenup Lock and Dam on the Ohio River. The bridge, named after author and Greenup County, Kentucky native Jesse Stuart, was completed in 1984 and carries Kentucky Route 10 (unsigned) from the AA Highway / U.S. Route 23 intersection to the bridge itself, where it becomes State Route 253 to U.S. Route 52. The Ohio approach has a ramp to a rest area operated by the Ohio Department of Transportation. There is also a park on the Kentucky side of the bridge, which is open for fishing and recreation. This park is operated by the United States Army Corps of Engineers. Both facilities, and the bridge itself, were briefly closed after the September 11 attacks due to terrorism concerns since they are all part of the Greenup Locks and Dam complex. They have since reopened; however, access to the observation platforms on both sides of the dam is no longer permitted.

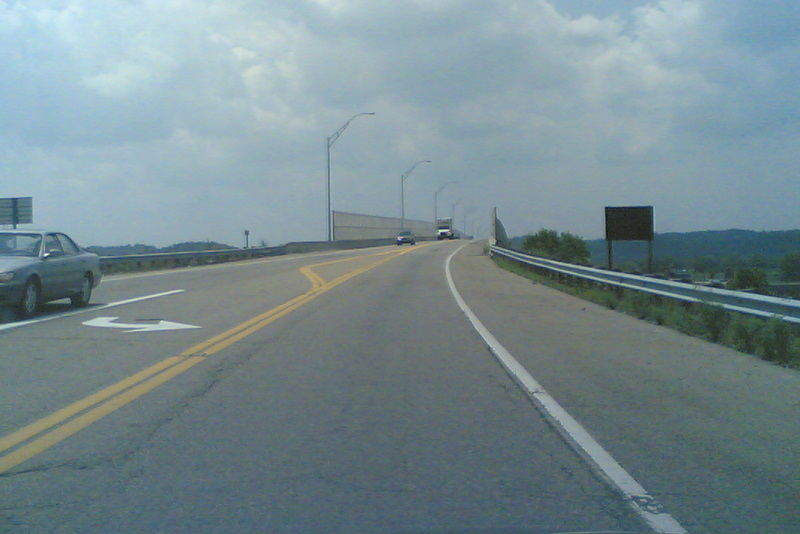
A view just before crossing the Jesse Stuart Memorial Bridge to Kentucky from Ohio S.R. 253

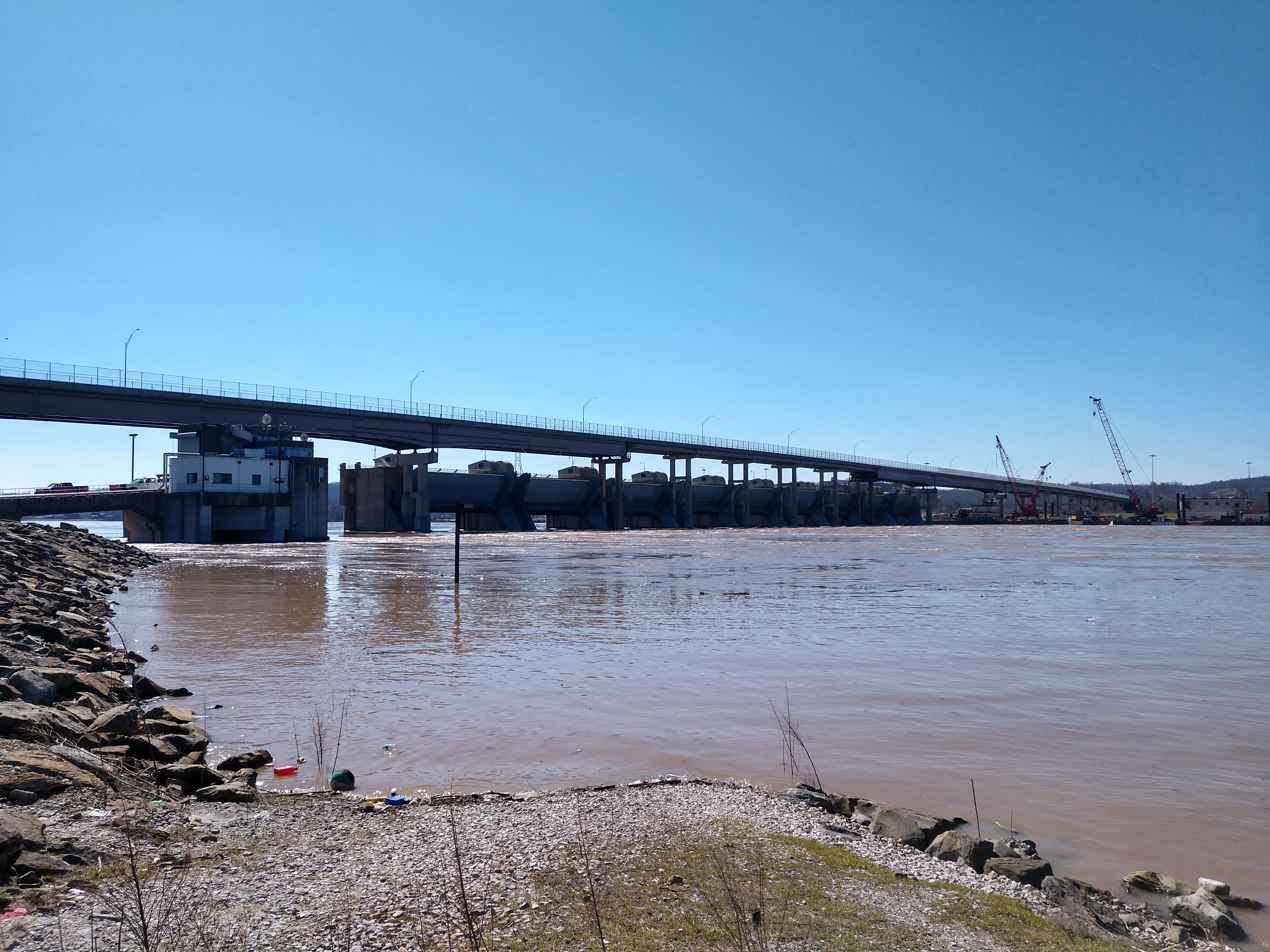
The Bridge over the Dam from the Ohio side with the Ohio River at 58 feet

== See also ==
- List of crossings of the Ohio River
- Greenup Lock and Dam
