= Ben Williamson and Simeon Willis Memorial Bridges =

Ben Williamson Memorial Bridge & Simeon Willis Memorial Bridge
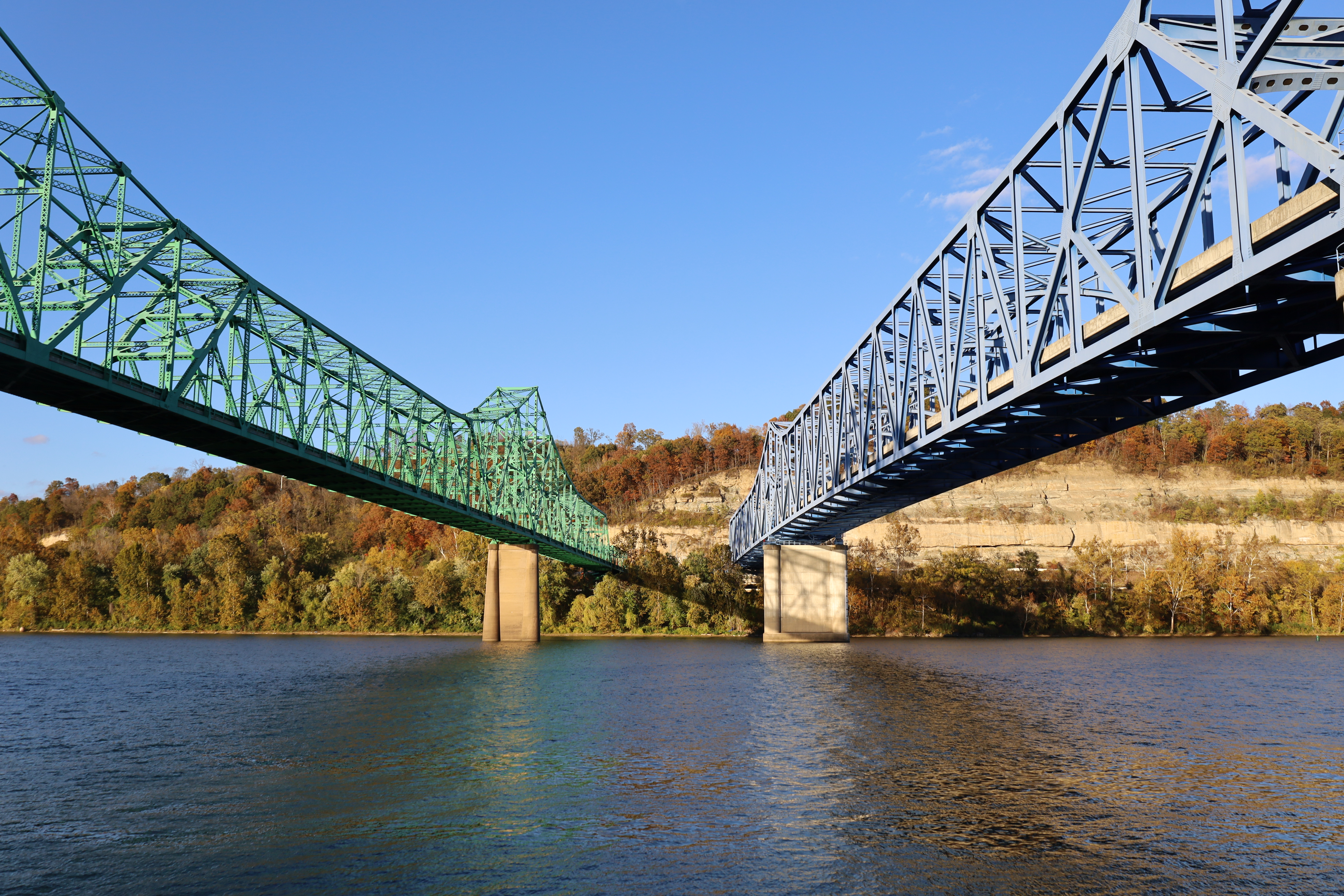
- The bridges in 2023. Old Ben is the green bridge in this photo; Simeon Bridge is on the right
- Coordinates: 38°29′03″N 082°38′28″W
- Carries: 5 lanes; 2 of southbound SR 652 and Martin Luther King Jr. Boulevard (12th Street); 3 lanes of Northbound Martin Luther King Jr. Boulevard (13th Street) and SR 652
- Crosses: Ohio River
- Locale: Coal Grove, Ohio and Ashland, Kentucky
- Other name(s): Green Bridge, Old Ben, 12th Street Bridge, Blue Bridge, 13th Street Bridge
- Maintained by: Kentucky Transportation Cabinet

Characteristics
- Design: Cantilever bridges
- Longest span: 738 feet (225 m)

History
- Opened: 1932; 1985

The Ben Williamson Memorial Bridge and Simeon Willis Memorial Bridge, also known as the "Green Bridge" and "Blue Bridge" respectively, are a pair of cantilever bridges that connect Coal Grove, Ohio to Ashland, Kentucky, crossing the Ohio River.

The shorter Ohio portion of the dual bridge officially carries part of Ohio State Route 652, but is not signed as such.

== History ==
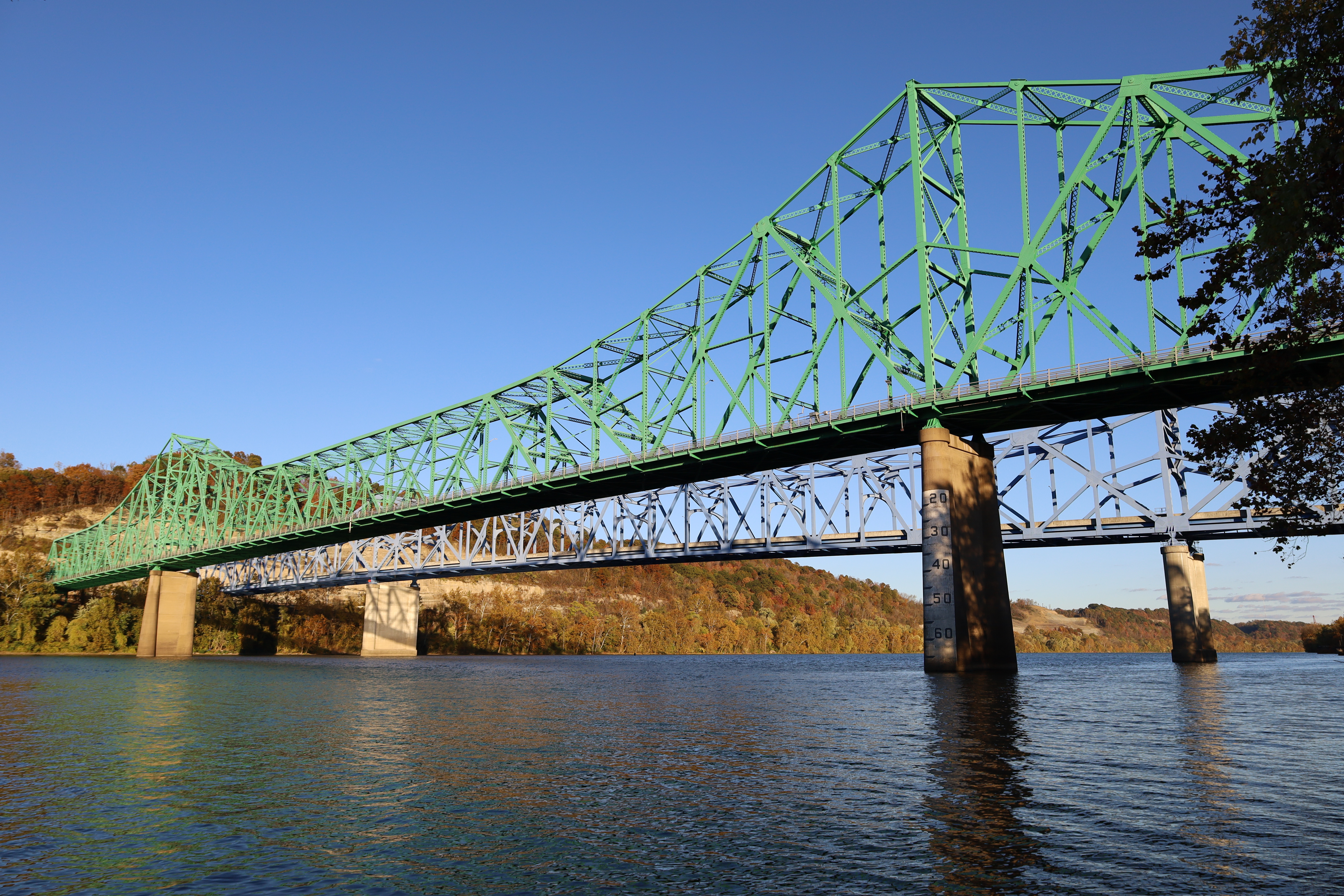
The bridges in 2023

The Ben Williamson Memorial Bridge was completed in 1932. It is named for Senator Ben M. Williamson.

In 1985, the Simeon Willis Memorial Bridge was opened to traffic. The second span is named for Kentucky Governor Simeon S. Willis. The bridge was originally planned to cross at 45th St. and connect to a proposed Ashland bypass, but was instead built one block from the existing bridge and carries only northbound traffic while the Williamso Bridge was converted to serve southbound traffic.

Since the completion of the Willis bridge, the Williamson Bridge has been closed and traffic in both directions has been diverted to the Willis bridge four times. In 1989 and 2018, the Williamson bridge was closed for renovations; for painting in 2007; and for several months in 2013 after a tractor-trailer ran into the tower on the Ohio side, causing structural damage to the bridge.

== See also ==
- List of crossings of the Ohio River
