= Lloyd, Kentucky =

Unincorporated community in Kentucky, United States

- Unincorporated community
- Location within Kentucky Location within the United States
- Coordinates: 38°37′12″N 82°51′53″W
- Country: United States
- State: Kentucky
- County: Greenup
- Elevation: 541 ft (165 m)
- Time zone: UTC-5 (Eastern (EST))
  - Summer (DST): UTC-4 (EDT)
- Area code: 606
- GNIS feature ID: 496917

Lloyd is an unincorporated community located in Greenup County, Kentucky, United States. Lloyd appears on the Greenup and Wheelersburg USGS maps.

Greenup County High School, the Greenup County Area Technology Center, Greysbranch Elementary School, the Greenup County Schools central office and the Greenup Lock and Dam/Jesse Stuart Memorial Bridge on the Ohio River are located in Lloyd.
