= Cincinnati Southern Bridge =

Rail bridge over the Ohio River in the US

Coordinates: 39.098036°N 84.542043°W

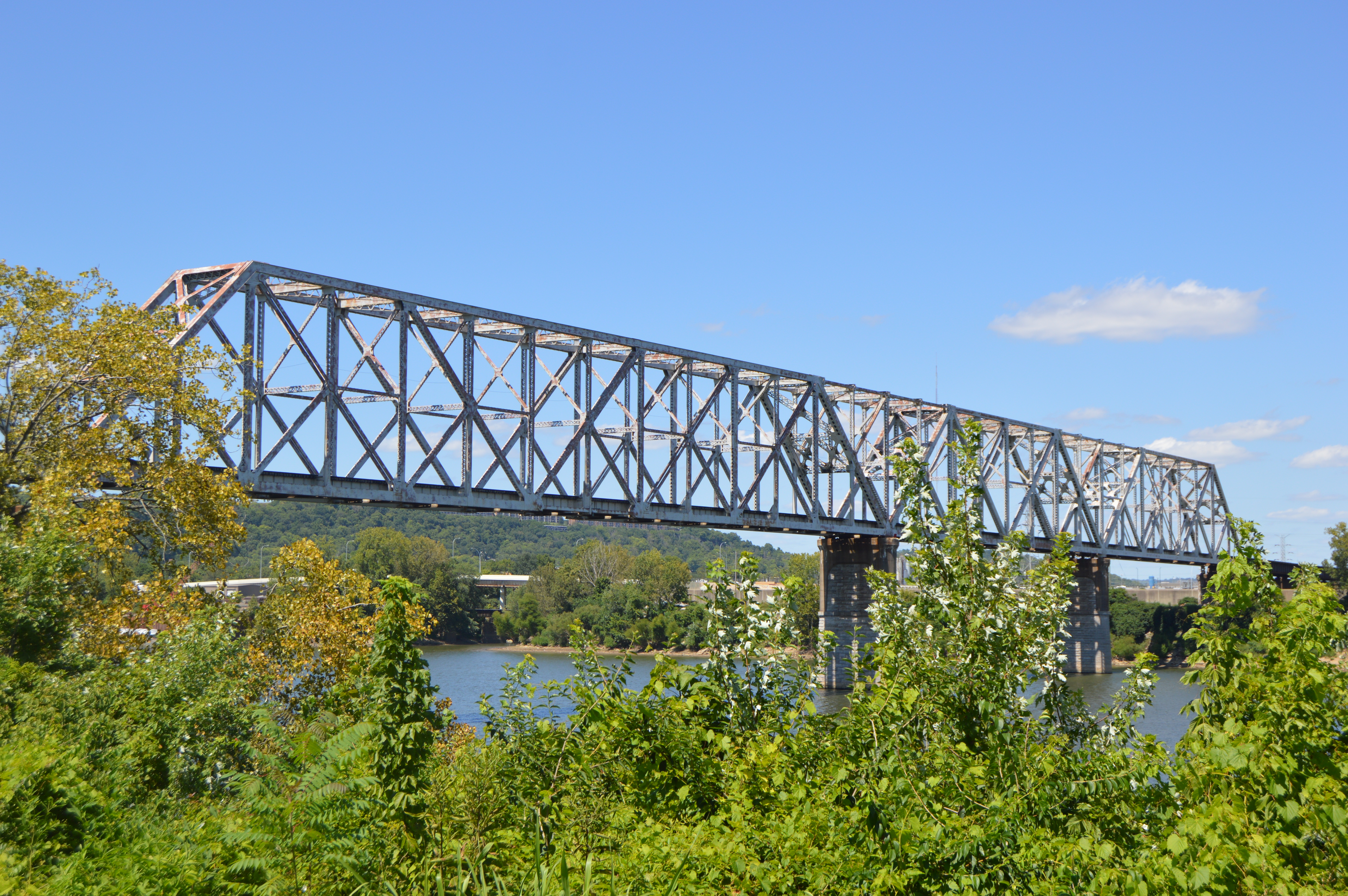
Eastern side, seen from Kentucky, in 2015

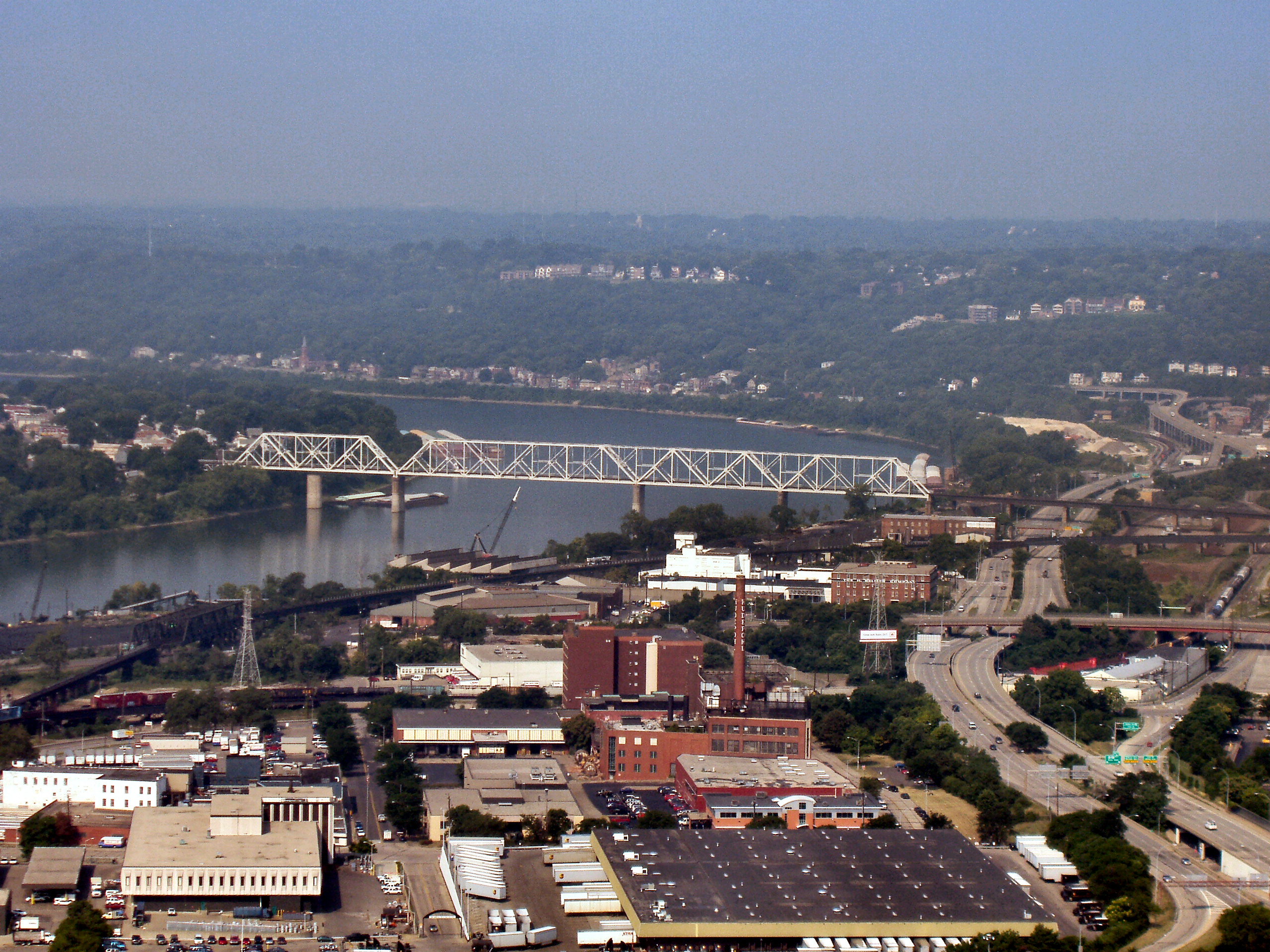
The bridge from the east in 2005

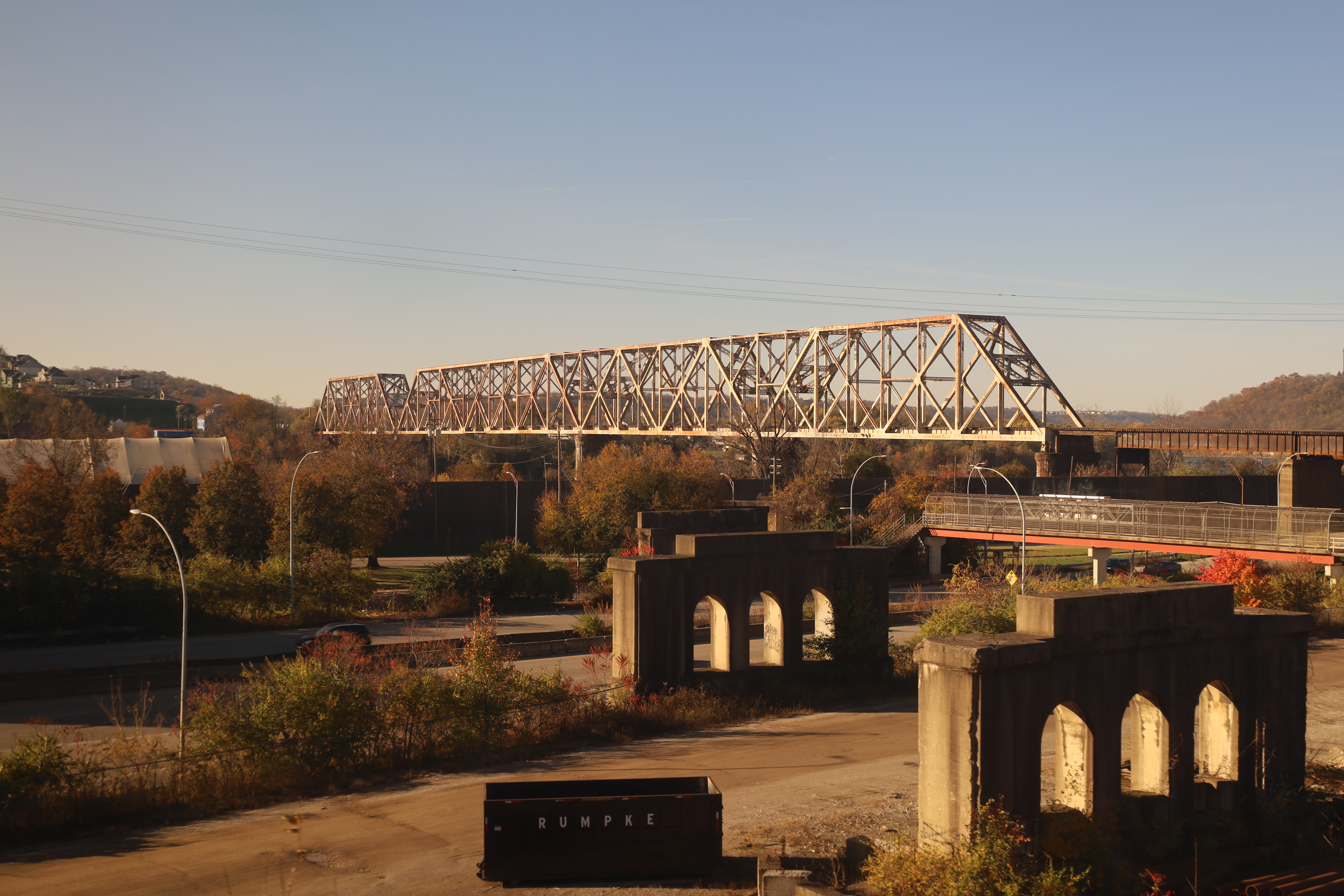
The bridge viewed from an Amtrak Cardinal train in 2025

The Cincinnati Southern Bridge is a vertical lift bridge that carries the Norfolk Southern Railway's Cincinnati, New Orleans and Texas Pacific Railway over the Ohio River between Cincinnati, Ohio, and Ludlow, Kentucky in the United States.

The bridge is composed of four through truss spans: a main span on the northern side of the bridge, a currently unused vertical lift span on the southern side, and two additional spans over the main shipping channels in the center of the bridge. The bridge crosses the Ohio River just downstream from downtown Cincinnati, and can be seen clearly from the lower level of the nearby Brent Spence Bridge.

== History ==
The Cincinnati Southern Railway Bridge was begun in 1875; construction was completed in December, 1877, and the bridge immediately opened to traffic. Its cost exclusive of right of way was $811,683. The 519-foot (158 m) truss bridge was the longest bridge of its type when it was completed.

It was extensively modernized in 1922, and it remains the busiest railroad bridge in the city of Cincinnati today. The modernization replaced a swing span with a vertical lift span that was designed to rise only 13 feet., which was all that was considered necessary for clearance during periods of high water at that time. The swing pier from the original structure was left in place even though it was no longer physically connected to the bridge, creating an unusual visual appearance. Since 1976, the bridge's vertical lift span has been abandoned and fixed shut, and even before that point it was hardly used except during periods of flooding.

== See also ==
- List of crossings of the Ohio River
