= Greenup County High School =

Coordinates: 38°37′51″N 82°52′14″W

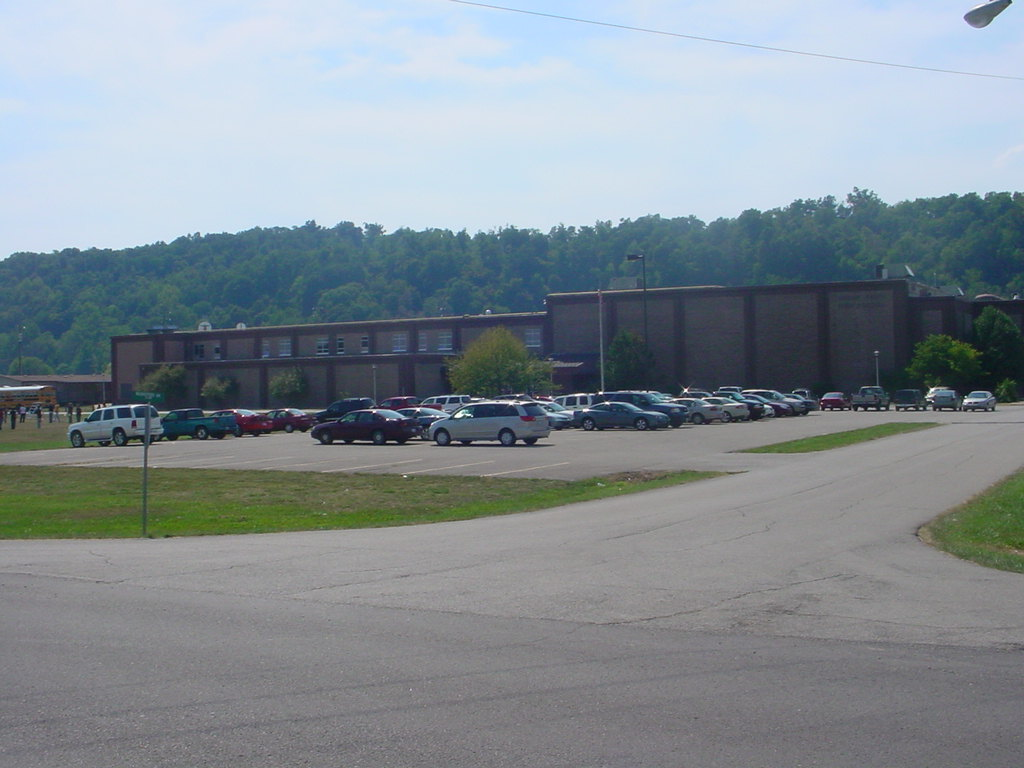
- Home of the Musketeers
- 196 Musketeer Drive; Greenup, Kentucky; United States

Information
- Type: Kentucky, public, rural, high school
- Motto: All For One, One For All
- Established: 1972
- School district: Greenup County Schools
- Superintendent: Steve Hall, Interim
- Principal: Anthony Thompson
- Teaching staff: 53.00 (FTE)
- Grades: 9–12
- Student to teacher ratio: 15.64
- Colors: Black, gold and green
- Fight song: "Buckeye Battle Cry"
- Athletics: Dance Team, Baseball, Cheerleading, Softball, Football, Boys' Golf, Girls' Golf, Boys' Soccer, Girls' Soccer, Boys' Basketball, Girls' Basketball, Tennis, Track, Volleyball
- Nickname: Musketeers
- Rival: Russell High School; Raceland-Worthington High School
- Website: District Website; School Website

Greenup County High School is a public high school in Lloyd, Kentucky, an unincorporated area just outside the city of Greenup, the county seat of Greenup County in the northeastern part of the U.S. state of Kentucky. Their mascot is the Musketeers, and their colors are green, black, and gold.

== History ==
Greenup County High School was officially dedicated in 1972. It was built by Foson Construction Company out of Ashland, Kentucky. The school contains four grades, 9–12. It was formed when McKell High School, Greenup High School, and Wurtland High School were closed. That is the explanation for the school mascot, Musketeer, and motto, All For One, and One For All. In the Spring of 2007, the Greenup County Board of Education approved the 8 million dollar renovation of the high school. It was constructed by J and H Reinforcing and Structural Erectors from Portsmouth, Ohio. Phases 1 and 2 consisted of The renovations to the upstairs and downstairs of the current building. Phase 3 consisted of new HVAC units for the building. In the Spring of 2010, construction of two special education classrooms was approved by the Kentucky Department of Education and the Greenup County Board of Education. All construction work is now complete. On July 20, 2023, Greenup County schools received 14.9 Million dollar energy efficiency grant from the US Department of Energy. Greenup County will use the grant to replace the roof of its high school, install solar electric panels and solar thermal water heating technology, replace lighting in the middle and high schools, and replace 18 single-pane windows. In addition, the district plans to purchase four electric school buses.

== Sports ==
- Dance Team
- Baseball
- Cheerleading
- Softball
- Football
- Boys' Golf
- Girls' Golf
- Boys' Soccer
- Girls' Soccer
- Boys' Basketball
- Girls' Basketball
- Tennis
- Track
- Volleyball
- archery
- Wrestling

== Miscellaneous ==
- Home of the 1977 Kentucky 4A state football champions.
- Home of the 17-time UCA National Champions. And 3 time World Champions.

(Competitive Cheerleading)

- Home of the 14-time competitive dance team National Champions.
- Home of the 2024 men's basketball 63rd district champions.
