= Willow Grove, Kentucky =

Unincorporated community in Kentucky, United States

- Unincorporated community
- Location within Kentucky
- Coordinates: 38°47′18″N 84°10′19″W
- Country: United States
- State: Kentucky
- County: Bracken
- Elevation: 538 ft (164 m)
- Time zone: UTC-5 (Eastern (EST))
  - Summer (DST): UTC-4 (EDT)
- Area code: 859
- GNIS feature ID: 509377

Willow Grove is an unincorporated community in Bracken County, Kentucky, United States.
