= Wabash Bridge (Ohio River) =

Bridge in the United States

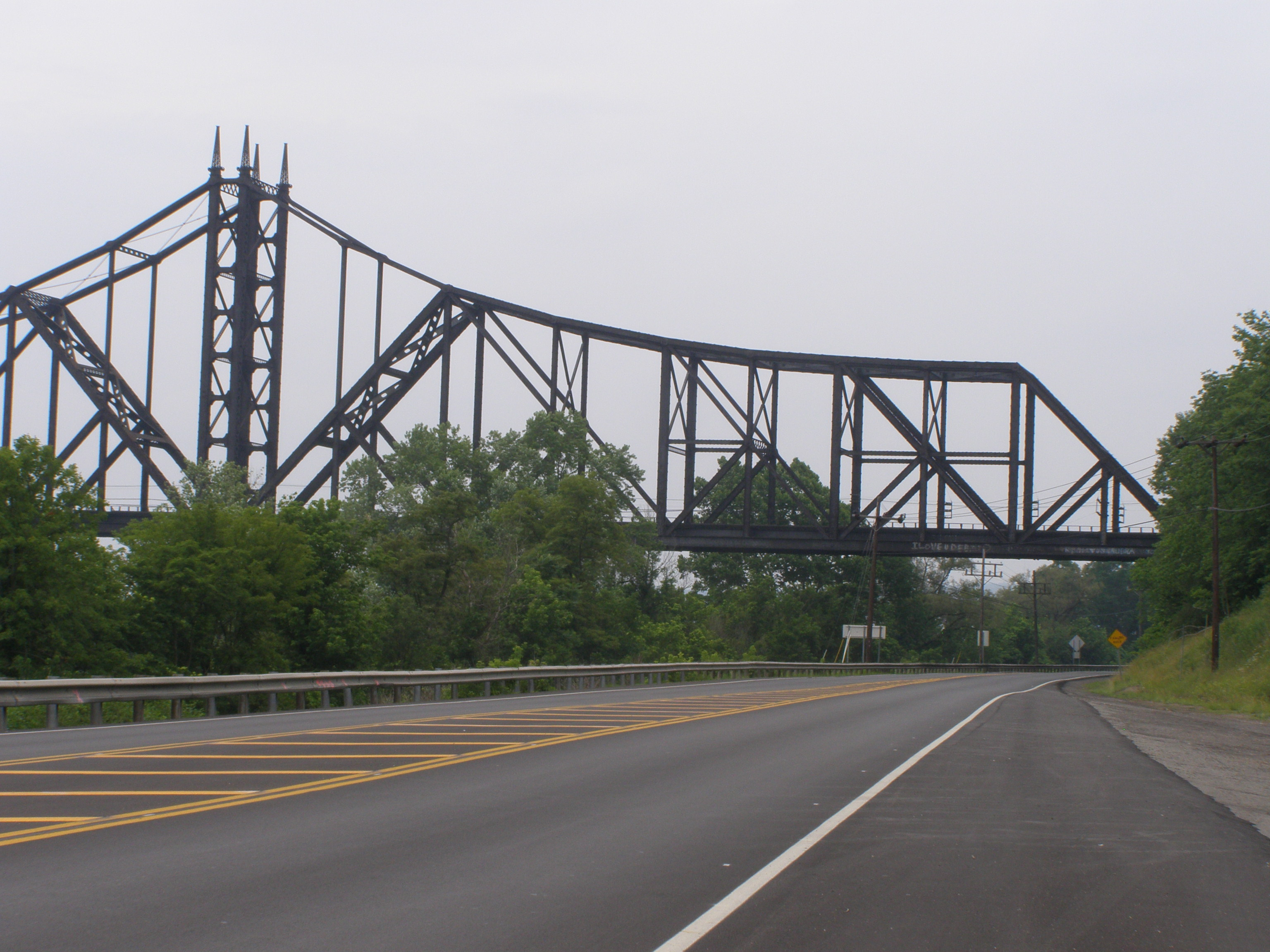
- Eastern end of Wabash Bridge, from Route 2
- Coordinates: 40°18′37″N 80°36′06″W
- Locale: Mingo Junction, Ohio, and Follansbee, West Virginia

Characteristics
- Design: Cantilever bridge

Location
- Interactive map of Wabash Bridge

The Wabash Bridge is a railroad bridge over the Ohio River between the states of West Virginia and Ohio. It was the longest cantilever truss span for a short time when it was built. The bridge is also noted for its decorative finials on top of the towers. With its eastern end located on Route 2 in West Virginia, between Follansbee and Wellsburg, it was also a popular route for foot traffic from Follansbee and Wellsburg to Mingo Junction in Ohio. Streetcar service was provided on the West Virginia side to the steps leading to the footpath along the bridge.

== Specifications ==
- Service - Railroad (Wheeling and Lake Erie) over the Ohio River
- Location - Mingo Junction, Ohio and Rural Brooke County, West Virginia
- Structure Type - Metal Cantilever Rivet - Baltimore Through Truss
- Construction Date - 1904
- Builder/Contractor - American Bridge Company of New York, New York
- Main Span Length - 700 feet (210 m)
- Structure Length - 1,296 feet (395 m)
- Spans - 3 Main Span(s)
