= Lock and Dam Number 53 =

Lock and Dam No. 53
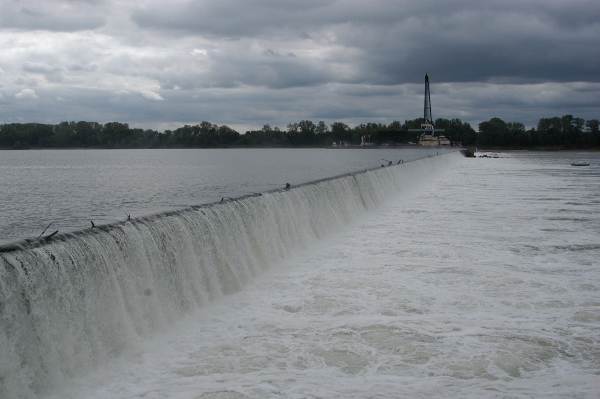
- Interactive map of Lock and Dam No. 53
- Location: Illinois/Kentucky border
- Coordinates: 37.1993°N 89.0373°W
- Opening date: 1929
- Demolition date: 2021
- Operator: United States Army Corps of Engineers Louisville District

Dam and spillways
- Type of dam: Wicket
- Impounds: Ohio River
- Length: 3,662 feet

Reservoir
- Normal elevation: was 290 feet above sealevel

Lock and Dam 53 was the first lock and dam upstream from the confluence of the Ohio River and the Mississippi River. It was located 962 miles downstream from Pittsburgh. Lock and Dam 53 had two locks for commercial barge traffic, one that was 1,200 feet long by 110 feet wide, the other 600 feet long by 110 feet wide. The lock has been demolished and Olmsted Lock and Dam has replaced it.

According to the New York Times, in 2015 72.3 million tonnes of cargo transited the lock, making it the second biggest and most economically important, in the United States, after nearby Lock and Dam Number 52.

According to the New York Times, the Olmsted project was scheduled to have been completed in 1998. In November 2016, the New York Times reported the Olmsted project was then scheduled to be complete in October 2018. The project's cost had ballooned from $775 million to $2.9 billion. It became operational in August 2018.

The New York Times reports that the United States Army Corps of Engineers, the Federal agency responsible for maintaining navigation on the USA's rivers, the delay in replacing the lock complex with the Olmsted project costs $640 million per year.

Landside demolition was completed in 2021, but underwater structure removal was ongoing through 2022. Final demolition was completed February 21, 2023.

== See also ==
- List of locks and dams of the Ohio River
- List of locks and dams of the Upper Mississippi River
