= Ohio State Route 253 =

State highway in Scioto County, Ohio, US

State Route 253

Route information
- Maintained by ODOT
- Length: 0.56 mi (900 m)
- Existed: 1989–present

Major junctions
- South end: KY 10 near Franklin Furnace
- North end: US 52 near Franklin Furnace

Location
- Country: United States
- State: Ohio
- Counties: Scioto

Highway system
- Ohio State Highway System; Interstate; US; State; Scenic
← SR 252	→ SR 254

State Route 253 (SR 253) is a very short state highway in the southern part of the U.S. state of Ohio. With an overall length of just 0.56 miles (0.90 km), the majority of SR 253 is a part of the Jesse Stuart Memorial Bridge, which crosses over the Ohio River near Franklin Furnace, Ohio. The southern terminus of SR 253 is at about the midspan of the bridge, where it crosses the Kentucky State Line and becomes Kentucky Route 10 (KY 10). The northern terminus of the highway is at a diamond interchange with U.S. Route 52 (US 52) near the eastern landing of the Ohio River crossing. The current SR 253 was established in the late 1980s. However, a different route with the same number existed in the Medina vicinity from the early 1920s until the late 1950s. It is signed north–south, though it runs in an east–west direction.

== Route description ==
SR 253 runs exclusively within Green Township in southeastern Scioto County, near the community of Franklin Furnace. This short highway starts at the Kentucky state line on the two-lane Jesse Stuart Memorial Bridge over the Ohio River, at the very point where KY 10 terminates. The highway departs the bridge to the east. After a short distance, it then crosses a shorter bridge over the Norfolk Southern Railway line. Right at the east end of that bridge, SR 253 comes to an end at a diamond interchange it has with the US 52 expressway. East of the interchange is a short connector to Scioto County Road 1, which runs parallel to US 52 to the east through this area.

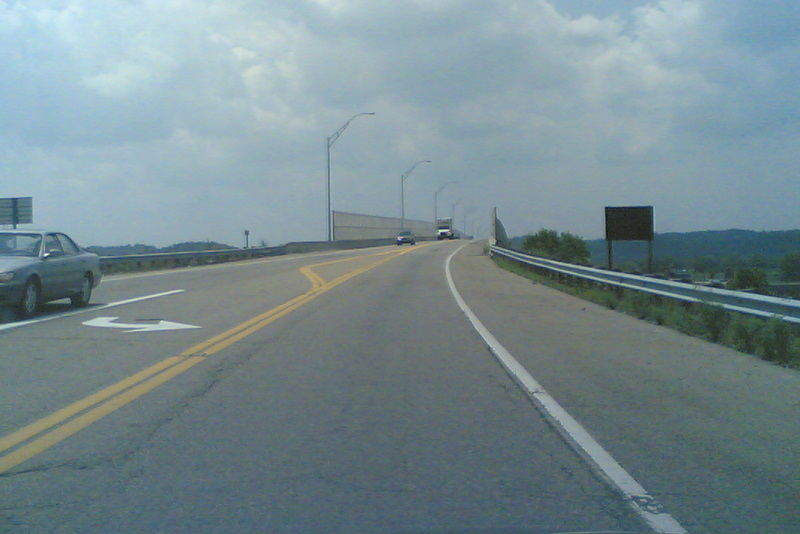
A view just before crossing the Jesse Stuart Memorial Bridge from Ohio to Kentucky on SR 253

On a regular basis, the Ohio Department of Transportation (ODOT) conducts surveys to measure the amount of traffic that uses its highway system. These traffic counts are commonly given in terms of average annual daily traffic (AADT), a determination of the number of vehicles on a particular segment of roadway on any typical day of the year. A traffic count by ODOT in 2008 showed that 7,210 cars and 710 trucks utilized SR 253 on a daily basis. The entirety of SR 253 is included within the National Highway System, a system of routes deemed most important for the economy, mobility and defense of the country.

== History ==
The SR 253 designation has been utilized on two separate occasions. The first iteration of the highway began in 1925. At the time, in the northern half of Medina County, a segment of what is now county-maintained Fenn Road between the SR 18/SR 57 concurrency and U.S. Route 42 was brought into the state highway system. This roadway, which is located less than 1 mile (1.6 km) north of the city limits of Medina, was given the designation of SR 253. In 1937, the route was extended east along Fenn Road to a new eastern terminus at SR 3 northeast of Medina. SR 253's time of being routed along this stretch of roadway came to an end in 1958 when jurisdiction of Fenn Road was transferred from the state to Medina County.

By 1989, SR 253 was re-introduced to the state highway system. Coinciding with the completion of the Jesse Stuart Memorial Bridge across the Ohio River, the designation was applied to the brief alignment that it maintains to this day from the Kentucky state line on the bridge to the US 52 expressway.

== Major intersections ==
The entire route is in Green Township, Scioto County.

mi	km	Destinations	Notes
0.00	0.00	KY 10 west to US 23 / AA Hwy (KY 9)	Kentucky state line (Jesse Stuart Memorial Bridge over Ohio River)
0.56	0.90	US 52 – Portsmouth, Ironton	interchange
1.000 mi = 1.609 km; 1.000 km = 0.621 mi
