= Henderson Bridge (Ohio River) =

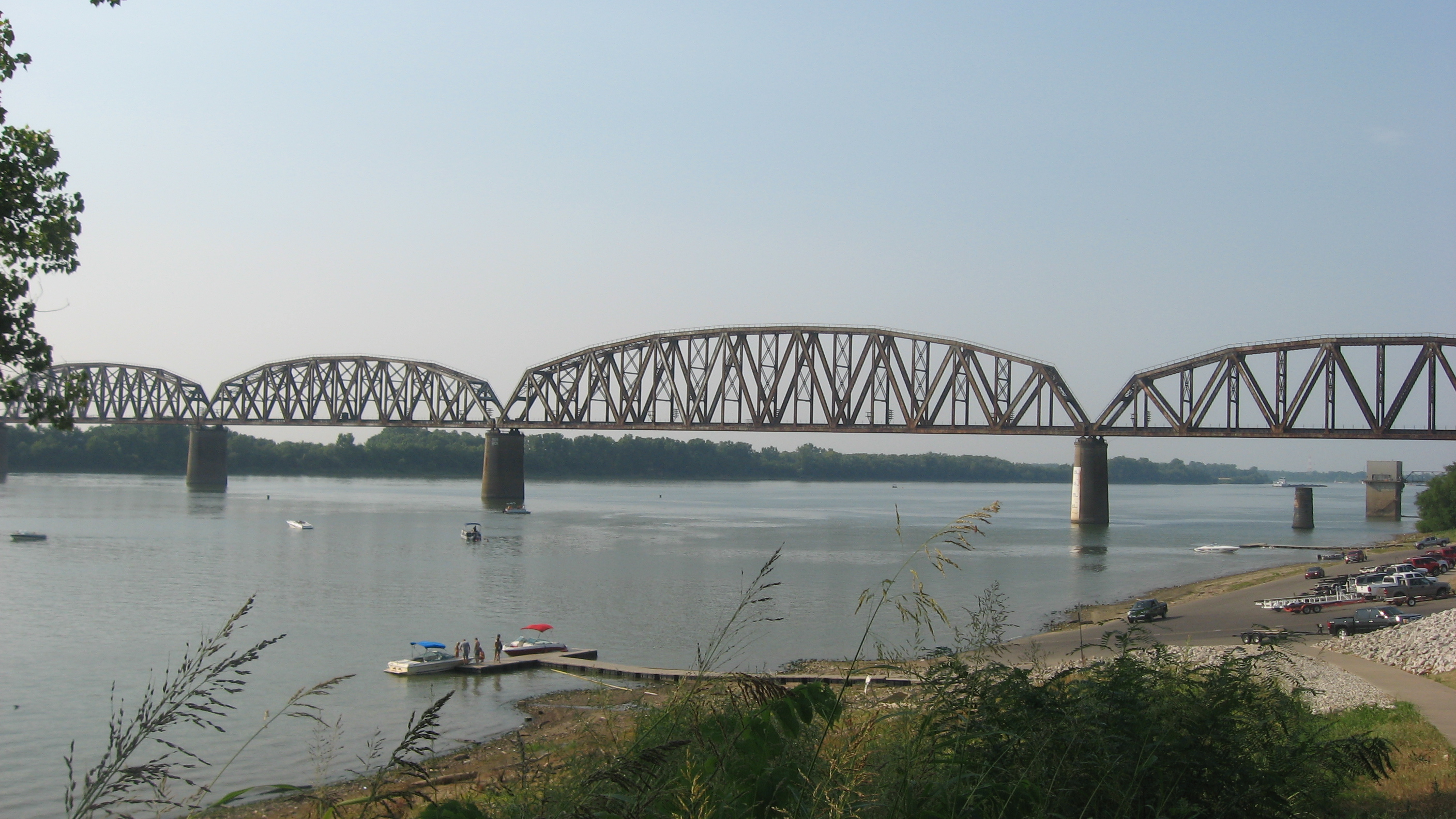
- Coordinates: 37°50′44.1″N 87°35′47.2″W
- Carries: CSX Transportation railroad
- Crosses: Ohio River
- Locale: Henderson, Kentucky and Vanderburgh County, Indiana

Characteristics
- Design: Truss bridge
- Total length: 12,123 ft (3,695 m)
- Longest span: 648 ft (198 m)

History
- Opened: December 31, 1932

Location
- Interactive map of Henderson Bridge

The Henderson Bridge is a railroad bridge spanning the Ohio River between Henderson, Kentucky and Vanderburgh County, Indiana. The bridge is owned by the CSX Transportation.

The original bridge was constructed in 1884 to 1885 by the Louisville and Nashville Railroad at a cost of $2,000,000. The single-tracked bridge was approximately 3,686 feet (1,123 m) long, and its longest span, at 525 feet (160 m), was reputed to be the longest trestle span in the world at that time. The bridge ran from the northern edge of Main Street in Henderson to the low water mark on the Indiana side, resting on 15 stone piers. It was designed to carry two 118,000-pound (54,000 kg) engines followed by 60,000-pound (27,000 kg) coal tenders, and its maximum uniform load capacity was 2,500 pounds per foot (3,700 kg/m). A crowd of 8,000 watched the first train cross the bridge on July 13, 1885.

Prior to the opening of the bridge, railroad passengers and freight had to be transferred to a ferry for the river crossing. The bridge reduced the travel time by several hours.

By 1930 the volume and weight of train traffic were taxing the capabilities of the original bridge. Construction of a new bridge just upstream of the old one began in May 1931. The new bridge, costing over $3,000,000, opened on December 31, 1932. Including its approaches, It is 12,123 feet (3,695 m) long, and its span over the main channel is 648 feet (198 m) long. The demolition of the old bridge, using dynamite, was completed on December 11, 1933.

== See also ==
- List of crossings of the Ohio River
- Bi-State Vietnam Gold Star Bridges: a nearby road bridge over the Ohio River
- I-69 Ohio River Crossing: a proposed nearby road bridge over the Ohio River
