= Olmsted Locks and Dam =

Olmsted Locks and Dam (Locks and Dams 52 and 53 Replacement Project)
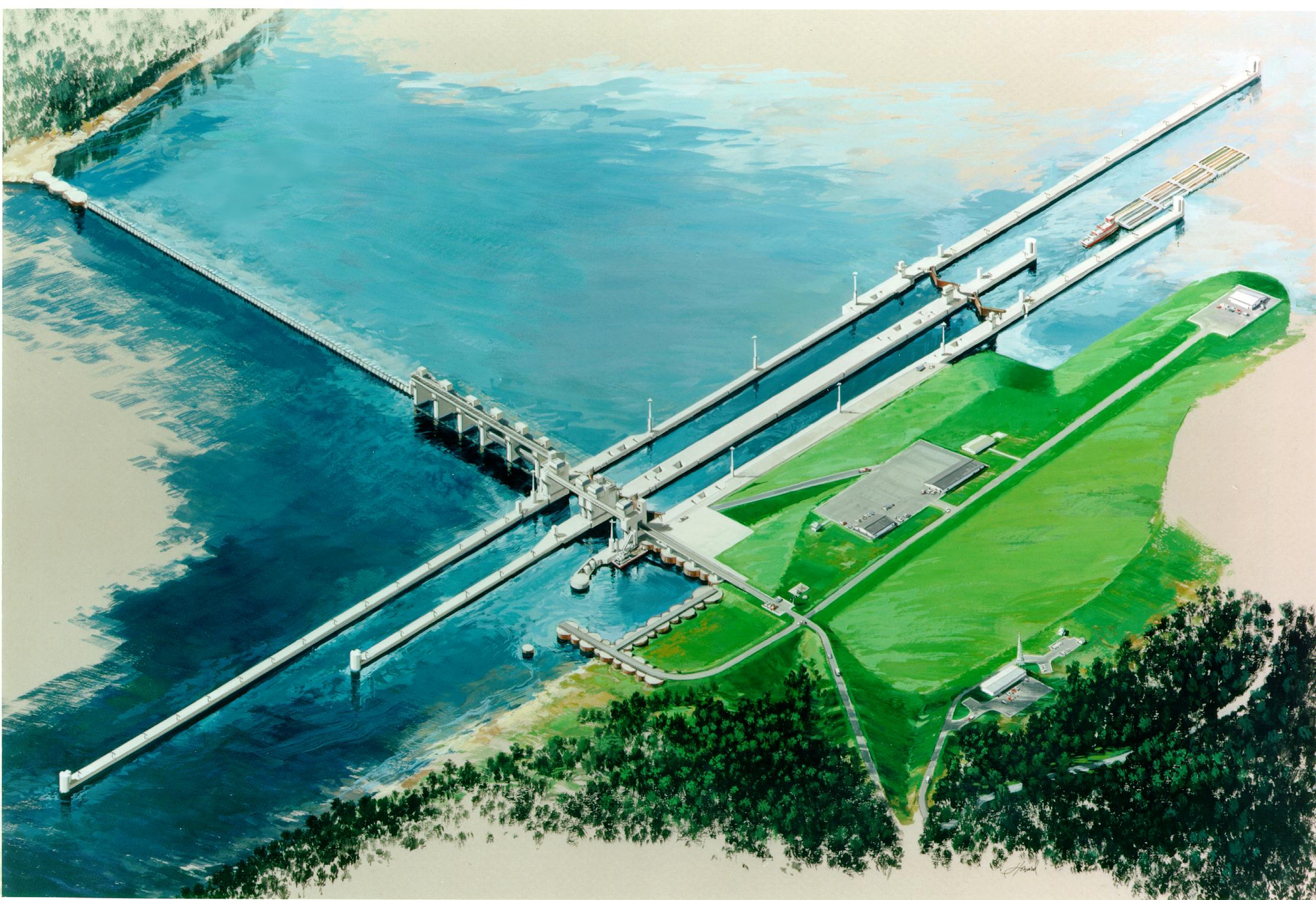
- Rendering of Olmsted Locks and Dam
- Interactive map of Olmsted Locks and Dam (Locks and Dams 52 and 53 Replacement Project)
- Location: Pulaski County, Illinois / Ballard County, Kentucky United States
- Coordinates: 37°11′01″N 89°03′50″W
- Construction began: December 1995
- Opening date: August 2018
- Construction cost: Estimated $3 billion+ (as of February 2018)
- Operator: United States Army Corps of Engineers Louisville District

Dam and spillways
- Impounds: Ohio River
- Height: 62 feet (19 m)
- Length: 2,596 feet (791 m)

The Olmsted Locks and Dam is a locks and wicket dam on the Ohio River at river mile 964.4. The project is intended to reduce tow and barge delays by replacing the existing older, and frequently congested, locks and dams Number 52 and Number 53. The locks are located about 17 miles upstream from the confluence of the Ohio and Mississippi rivers at Olmsted, Illinois.

The Olmsted has been operational since August 2018 while the removal of Locks and Dams 52 and 53 was completed in 2023. The project is both the largest and the most expensive inland waterway project ever undertaken in the United States.

== History ==
The US Congress, through the Water Resources Development Act of 1988 first approved a $775 million budget for the project in 1988 (October 1987 Price Levels). The lock chambers, completed in 2002, are 110 feet (34 m) wide and 1,200 feet (370 m) long.

According to the US Army Corps of Engineers, the new dam and locks will reduce passage time to under one hour with the new system. Due to queuing at Lock and Dam Number 52 and Lock and Dam Number 53, it can take cargo traffic 15 to 20 hours each to transit the locks the Olmsted complex is intended to replace.

When initiated the complex was projected to cost $775 million. As of February 2018, the estimated cost of the project is over $3 billion.

While the project was initially scheduled for completion in 1998, by 2016 it was projected to become operational between 2018 and by 2020, Locks and Dams 52 and 53 would be decommissioned. The project became fully operational on August 30, 2018.

The United States Army Corps of Engineers (USACE), the federal agency responsible for maintaining navigation on the USA's rivers, estimates the delay in completing the project results in a yearly loss of about $640 million to $800 million in lost benefits to the nation. While calculating these benefits is complex because of the amount of variables considered, it essentially takes into account the reduced costs industry (or businesses using the river for commerce) would experience if the Olmsted Project was operational versus the current means of transit through the aging and often unreliable Locks and Dams 52 and 53. These benefits further calculate the reduced costs in moving cargo through the river versus the next available cheapest alternative, usually by rail or by truck.

== In-the-wet construction ==
The Locks and Dams 52 and 53 Replacement Project, better known as the Olmsted Locks and Dam Project makes use of the innovative in-the-wet construction. When a dam is constructed on a small river, engineers usually create a cofferdam (or an enclosure) within a river and drain the water out of it to facilitate construction. However, building this entire project through the use of cofferdams would have been incredibly disruptive to river traffic. As the largest transit point in the nation's river system where approximately 90 million tons of goods pass through each year, blocking large parts of the river would have caused major delays to river traffic even more so than evidenced at Locks and Dams 52 and 53.

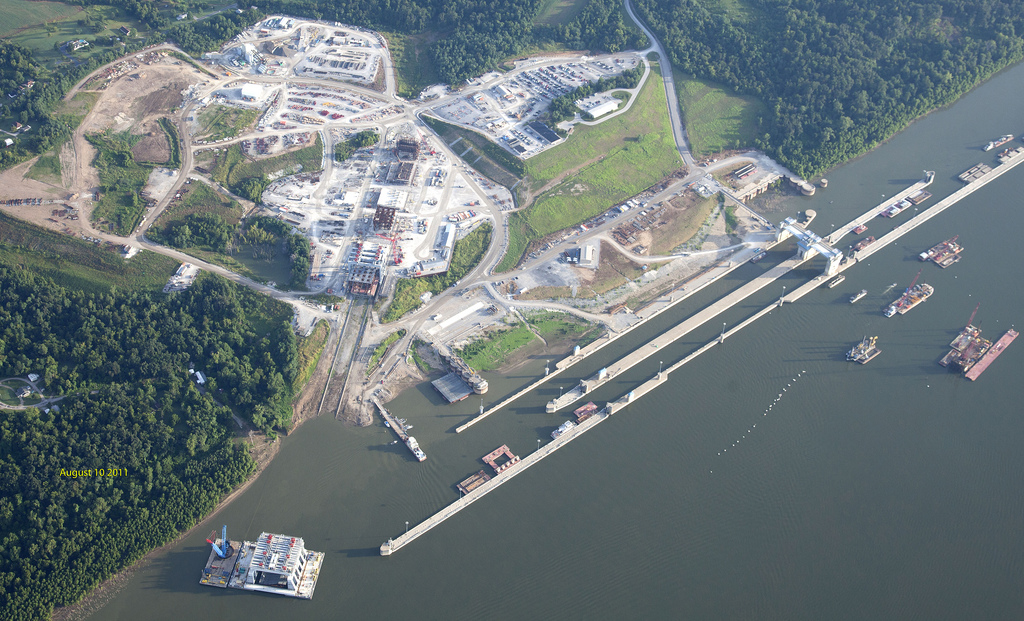
Site of the Olmsted Project. Notice the on-land casting yard where concrete elements of the dam are built and then transported into the river for placement.

Engineers instead chose to construct the dam portion of the project using the in-the-wet technique, where concrete portions of the dam itself were built offsite at a concrete casting yard, transported into the river for placement, and placed on the bottom of the river, all with minimal disruption to the river.

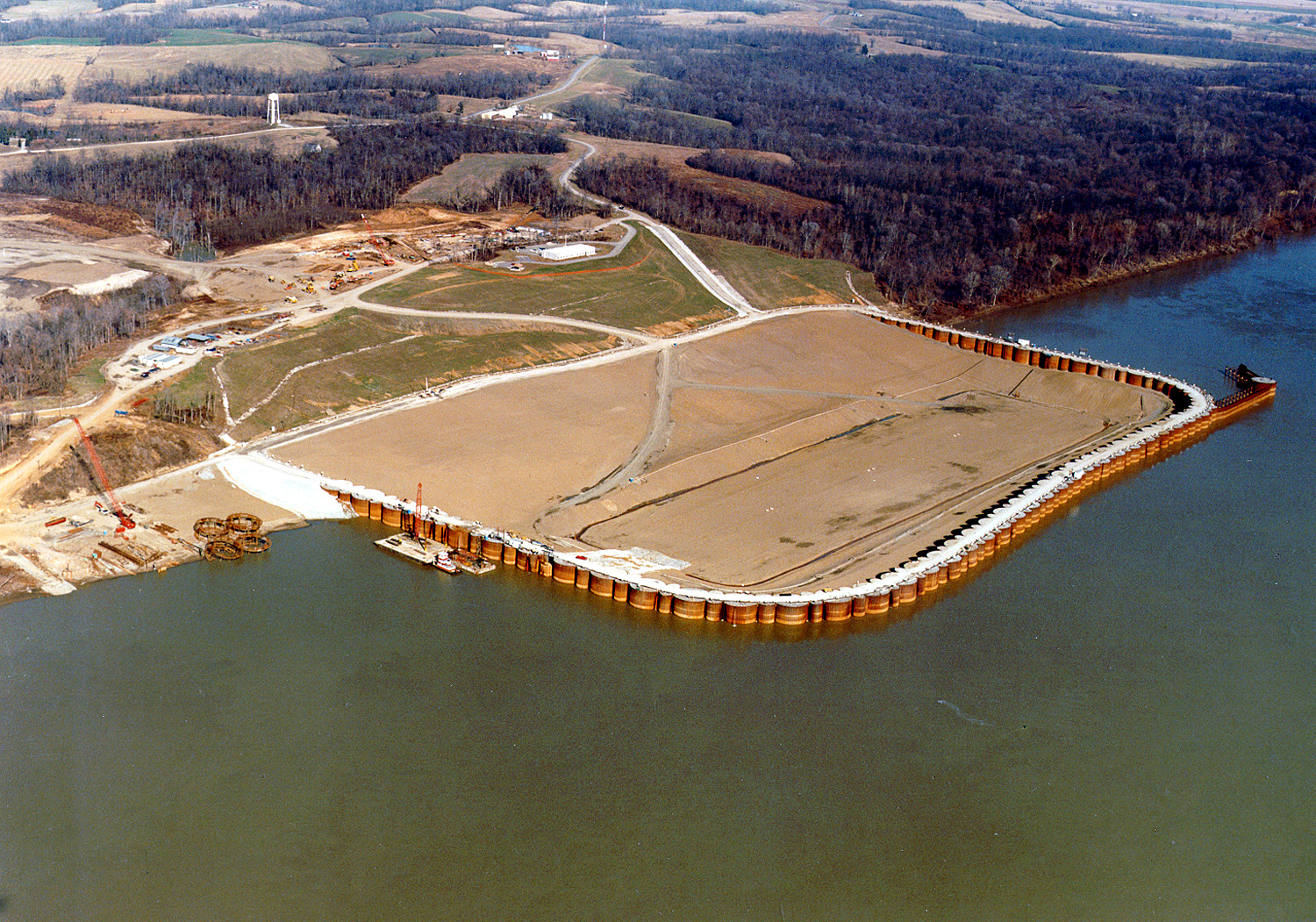
Cofferdam on the Olmsted Locks and Dam Project Site where the Lock Chambers were built

== Problems with the project – cost increases ==
This has been perhaps the longest and largest civil works project in the history of the Corps of Engineers. Multiple delays, especially in funding have created a 30-year endeavor that has been inflated from a $700+ million price tag to over $3 billion in early 2018.

The biggest contributors to these increases have been:

- Delays in funding and lack of availability of appropriations
- Costs increases of materials over time
- Low initial budget proposal for the project (engineers underestimated the initial costs of the project)
- In-the-wet construction
- Cost-reimbursable contracts (where the Government carries the majority of the risk of development)
- Unforeseen engineering problems
- Stretching of the budget (the USACE had and has other projects that require funds which were in turn taken away from Olmsted)
- Inflation
- Changes in design to the project
- Unpredictable river conditions

== See also ==
- List of locks and dams of the Ohio River
