= Ohio State Route 852 =

State highway in Scioto County, Ohio, US

State Route 852

Route information
- Maintained by ODOT
- Length: 0.94 mi (1,510 m)
- Existed: 1988–present

Major junctions
- South end: Carl Perkins Memorial Bridge on the Ohio River near Portsmouth
- US 23 Truck / US 52 / SR 73 / SR 104 in Portsmouth
- North end: SR 73 / SR 104 near Portsmouth

Location
- Country: United States
- State: Ohio
- Counties: Scioto

Highway system
- Ohio State Highway System; Interstate; US; State; Scenic
← SR 850	→ SR 872

State Route 852 (SR 852) is a north–south state highway in the southern portion of the U.S. state of Ohio. Its southern terminus is at the Kentucky state line on the Carl Perkins Memorial Bridge over the Ohio River near Portsmouth, and its northern terminus is at an interchange with the State Route 73/State Route 104 concurrency, just north of a complex interchange with U.S. Route 52 about 1.75 miles (2.82 km) west of Portsmouth.

== Route description ==
SR 852 begins on the Carl Perkins Memorial Bridge over the Ohio River. The route heads north as a two-lane highway, passing through farmland and woodland. The highway passes the Portsmouth Raceway Park and has an interchange with U.S. Route 52 (US 52), US 23 Truck, SR 73 east, and SR 104 south. The road has a traffic light at an access road from northbound SR 73 and SR 104. SR 852 ends at a partial interchange with SR 73 and SR 104.

The only section of SR 852 that is included as a part of the National Highway System (NHS), is that from the Kentucky state line north to the interchange with US 52. The NHS is a system of routes determined to be the most important for the nation's economy, mobility and defense. The highway is maintained by the Ohio Department of Transportation (ODOT) like all other state routes in the state. The department tracks the traffic volumes along all state highways as a part of its maintenance responsibilities using a metric called average annual daily traffic (AADT). This measurement is a calculation of the traffic level along a segment of roadway for any average day of the year. In 2011, ODOT figured that the lowest traffic levels were present on the section between the Kentucky state line and the interchange with US 52, where only 5,240 vehicles used the highway daily. The peak traffic volume was 12,730 vehicles AADT along a section of SR 852 on the bridge over US 52

== Major intersections ==
County	Location	mi	km	Destinations	Notes
Greenup	South Shore			US 23 Truck south / KY 8	Southern end of US 23 Truck concurrency
Ohio River		0.00	0.00	Carl Perkins Memorial Bridge (state line)	
Scioto	Portsmouth	0.57– 0.82	0.92– 1.32	US 23 Truck north / US 52 / SR 73 east / SR 104 south	Northern end of US 23 Truck concurrency
Scioto	Portsmouth	0.94	1.51	SR 73 west / SR 104 north	Northern terminus of SR 852
1.000 mi = 1.609 km; 1.000 km = 0.621 mi: Concurrency terminus
