= Ohio State Route 652 =

State highway in Lawrence County, Ohio, US

State Route 652

Route information
- Maintained by ODOT
- Length: 0.31 mi (500 m)
- Existed: August 2012–present

Major junctions
- South end: Ben Williamson Memorial Bridge on the Ohio River at Ashland, KY
- North end: US 52 in Coal Grove

Location
- Country: United States
- State: Ohio
- Counties: Lawrence

Highway system
- Ohio State Highway System; Interstate; US; State; Scenic
← SR 651	→ SR 655

State Route 652 (SR 652) is a north–south unsigned state highway in the southern portion of Ohio. Its southern terminus is on the Ben Williamson Memorial Bridge and Simeon Willis Memorial Bridge on the Ohio River near Coal Grove, and it runs 0.31 miles (0.50 km) to U.S. Route 52 (US 52).

== Route description ==
The highway follows the dual Ben Williamson Memorial Bridge (southbound) and Simeon Willis Memorial Bridge (northbound) crossings the Ohio River from Ashland, Kentucky, into Lawrence County, Ohio. The first 0.07 miles (0.11 km) of the SR 652 definition is the Ohio section of these bridges. From there, the northbound direction turns southeasterly in Coal Grove to follow a ramp that connects to US 52 eastbound, extending the full length of the highway to 0.31 miles (0.50 km).

== History ==
SR 652 made its first appearance in August 2012 after federal law changes required the Ohio Department of Transportation (ODOT) to designate a route number on state-maintained roads receiving federal aid.

== Major intersections ==
The entire route is in Coal Grove, Lawrence County.

mi	km	Destinations	Notes
0.00– 0.07	0.00– 0.11	Ben Williamson Memorial Bridge; Simeon Willis Memorial Bridge	
0.31	0.50	US 52	Northern terminus at end of ramp from bridge to US 52 east
1.000 mi = 1.609 km; 1.000 km = 0.621 mi
