= Lock and Dam Number 52 =

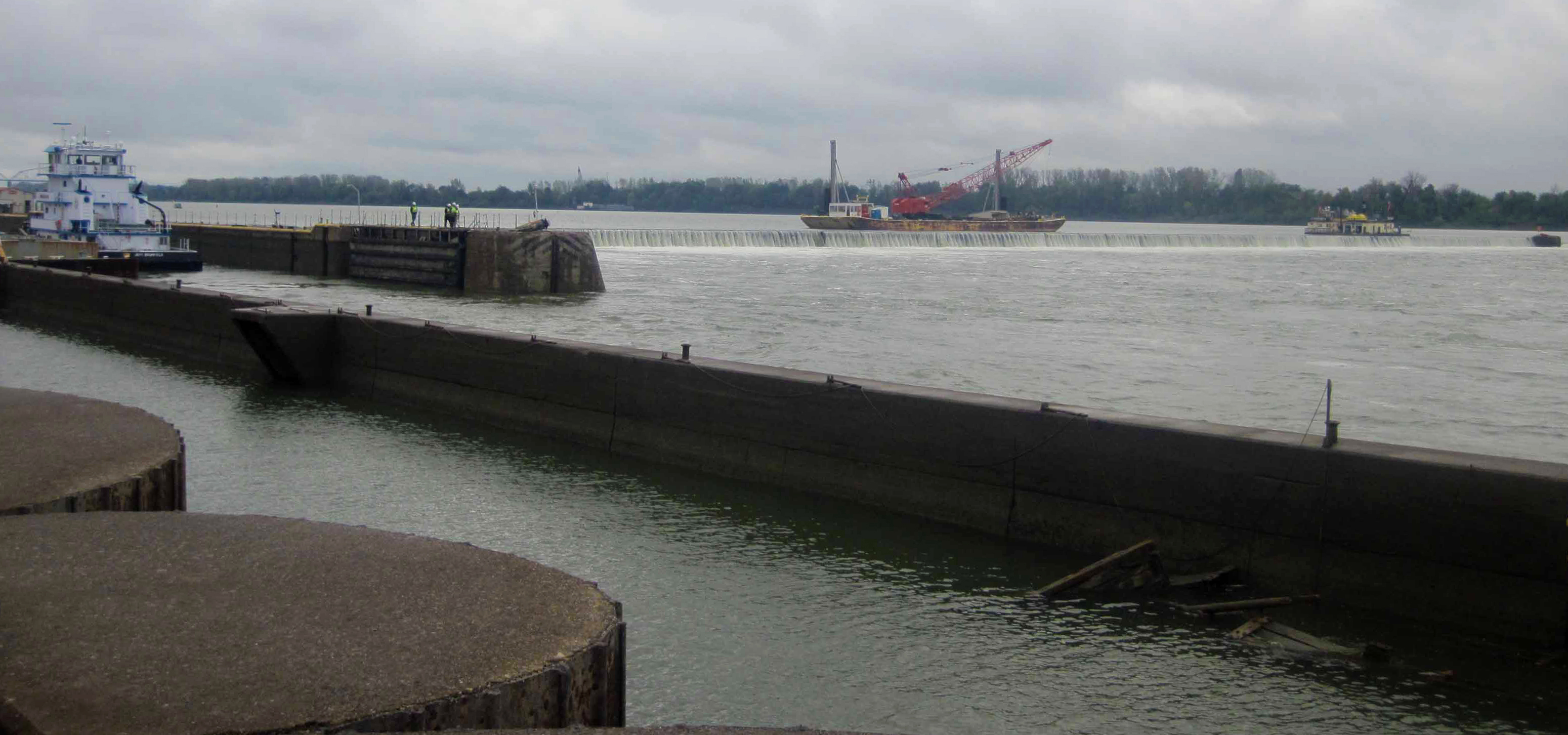
- Interactive map of Lock and Dam Number 52
- Location: Illinois/Kentucky border
- Coordinates: 37.1221°N 88.6560°W
- Opening date: 1929
- Demolition date: 2020
- Operator: United States Army Corps of Engineers Louisville District

Dam and spillways
- Type of dam: Wicket
- Impounds: Ohio River
- Length: 2,998 feet

Reservoir
- Normal elevation: 302 feet above sealevel

Lock and Dam 52 was the 19th lock and dam on the Ohio River. It was 939 miles (1,511 km) downstream of Pittsburgh and 23 miles (37 km) upstream from the confluence of the Mississippi River with the Ohio.

The lock complex was completed in 1929. There were two locks for commercial barge traffic, one that was 1,200 feet (370 m) long by 110 feet (34 m) wide, the other being 600 feet (180 m) long by 110 feet (34 m) wide. The complex was demolished in 2019–20.

According to the New York Times, in 2015 80.2 million tonnes of cargo transited the lock, making it the biggest and most economically important, in the United States. In a profile of the lock, the New York Times called it a "serious bottleneck", causing delays of 15 to 20 hours. Annually, 135 million tonnes of cargo passed through the lock. Olmsted Lock and Dam, completed in 2018, was built to replace lock and dam 52 and nearby lock and dam 53. According to the New York Times, the Olmsted project was scheduled to have been completed in 1998 (although the locks should have been replaced in 1988, since locks have an expected lifespan of approximately 50 years). In November 2016, the New York Times reported the Olmsted project was then scheduled to be complete in October 2018. The project's cost had ballooned from $775 million to $2.9 billion.

The New York Times reported that according to the US Army Engineers, the federal agency responsible for maintaining navigation on the United States' rivers, the delay in replacing the lock complex with the Olmsted project cost $640 million per year. It has been described as an "emblem of America's crumbling river infrastructure".

== See also ==
- List of locks and dams of the Ohio River
- List of locks and dams of the Upper Mississippi River
