= Bi-State Vietnam Gold Star Bridges =

Twin-span cantilever bridge between Henderson, Kentucky, and Evansville, Indiana, USA

The Twin Bridges
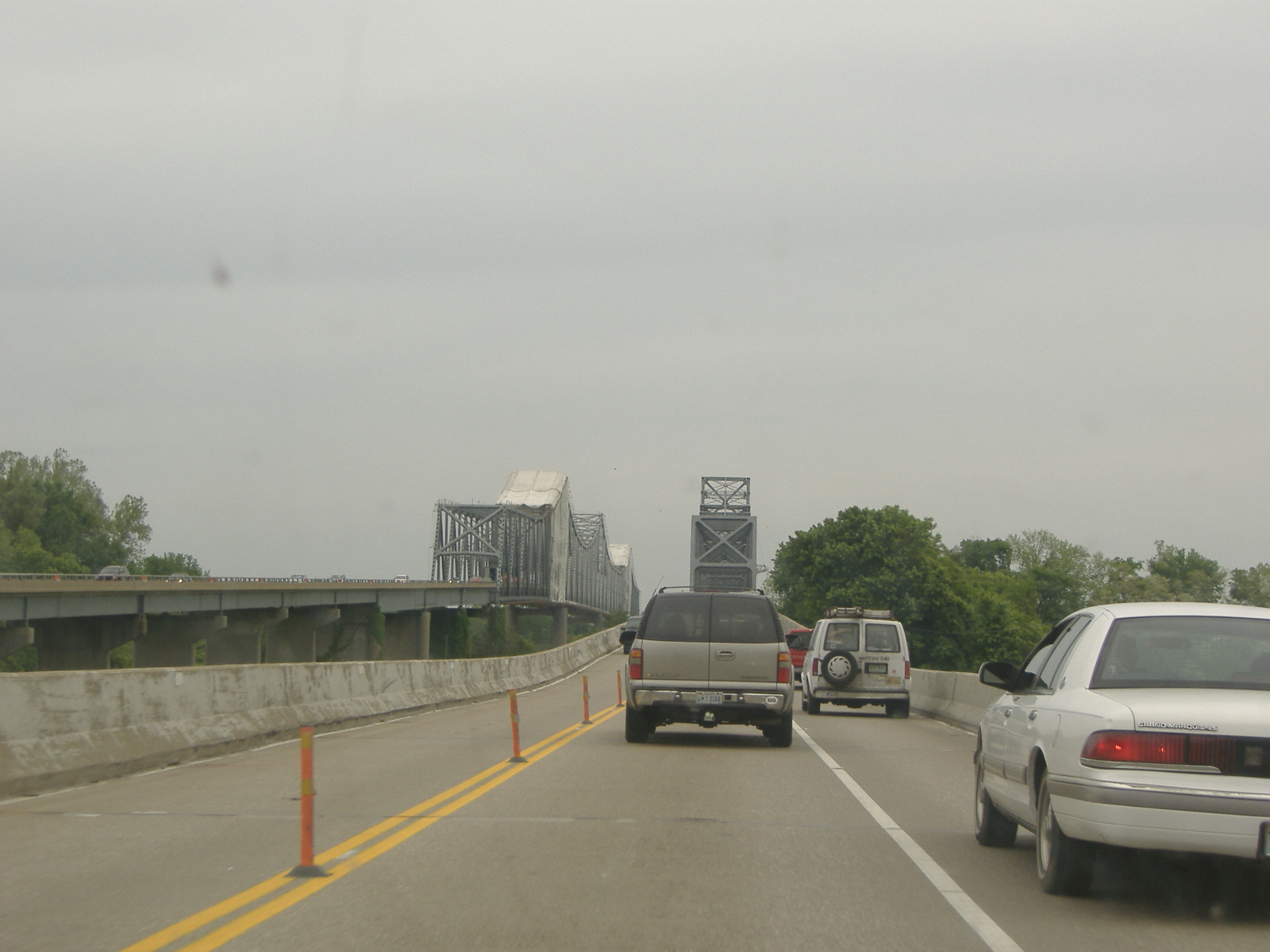
- On the northbound bridge; the bridge to the left is the newer southbound bridge, undergoing the 2007–08 renovation. The northbound bridge was reconfigured for two northbound lanes and one southbound lane, leaving one southbound lane on the southbound bridge.
- Coordinates: 37°54′15″N 87°33′2″W
- Carries: US 41
- Crosses: Ohio River
- Locale: Henderson County, Kentucky connecting Evansville, Indiana and Henderson, Kentucky (Bridges are 1.5 miles south of Indiana state line)
- Official name: Bi-State Vietnam Gold Star Twin Bridges
- Maintained by: KYTC (primary); INDOT (secondary)

Characteristics
- Design: Paired 3-Span Cantilever bridges

History
- Opened: Northbound Bridge: July 4, 1932; Southbound Bridge: December 16, 1965

Location
- Interactive map of The Twin Bridges

The Bi-State Vietnam Gold Star Twin Bridges, (usually referred to as simply The Twin Bridges, despite differences in their widths), are located in Henderson County, Kentucky and connect Henderson, Kentucky, and Evansville, Indiana, along U.S. Route 41 (US 41), two miles (3.2 km) south of the current southern terminus of Interstate 69 (I-69). The two bridges average more than 40,000 vehicles crossings a day across the Ohio River.

The northbound bridge opened to traffic on July 4, 1932. The southbound bridge opened on December 16, 1965, but will be decommissioned after the completion of the I-69 Ohio River Crossing about 1.6 miles (2.6 km) east, which is scheduled to be completed in 2031. The more historic northbound bridge will remain in service for US-41 as a two way bridge.

Both of the Bi-State Vietnam Gold Star Bridges are cantilever bridges. The northbound bridge stands 100 feet (30 m) over the Ohio River with a main span of 720 feet (220 m), with the steel gridwork extending 100 feet (30 m) above the driving surface. The southbound span has a main span of 600 feet (180 m).

An unusual fact about the bridges is that they are entirely within Kentucky. Although the Ohio River forms most of the border between Kentucky and Indiana, the state border is based on the course of the river as it existed when Kentucky became a state in 1792, when what would be Indiana was part of the unorganized Northwest Territory. Due to the New Madrid earthquake of 1812, the river changed course to the south, leaving the land where the bridges cross the river within Kentucky.

== History ==
The northbound span of the Bi-State Vietnam Gold Star Bridges was the second of three bridges built in Henderson County in 1932, a building novelty during the Great Depression. It was originally named the John James Audubon Bridge, or Audubon Memorial Bridge, after John James Audubon, who lived in Henderson in the 1810s. It was built by notable bridge designer Ralph Modjeski. The 5,395-foot (1,644 m) long cantilever bridge cost $2.4 million to build, with the federal government paying half, with the states of Kentucky and Indiana paying the remainder.

The dedication ceremony featured Kentucky Governor Ruby Laffoon and Indiana Governor Harry G. Leslie shaking hands with one another, as 22 military planes under the command of Jimmy Doolittle flew overhead with cannon fire and boat whistles in the distance celebrating the occasion. A flotilla of boats passed under the bridge, taking 40 minutes to do so and a two-mile (3.2 km) parade lasting two hours also celebrated the occasion. More than 100,000 visitors attended the celebration and 111,091 vehicles crossed the bridge in its first two days of operation, creating delays of up to two hours to go from Henderson to Evansville.

Originally, crossing the bridge required paying a toll, usually 30 to 35 cents for cars, and a nickel for pedestrians. The toll was removed on March 20, 1941.

By the mid-1950s, it became apparent that the single two-lane bridge was outmoded. With it came plans for a second span to address congestion. This span opened to traffic in July 1965; at this point, the original span was closed for much needed repairs. It reopened to northbound-only traffic in 1966.

On May 31, 1969, the bridges were officially renamed as the Bi-State Vietnam Gold Star Bridges in remembrance to the men who died in the Vietnam War.

In 1983, the northbound span was renovated.

In 1990, the southbound span was repainted.

In 2007, the Bi-State Vietnam Gold Star Bridges underwent $22 million in renovations involving maintenance and painting. Kentucky Governor Ernie Fletcher directed that at least two lanes in each direction should remain open during the construction. The maintenance ended in the middle of 2008. The last time the northbound bridge was rehabbed was in 1983. After the I-35W Mississippi River bridge collapsed in Minneapolis, Minnesota, in August 2007, officials stated that the main threat to the safety of the Bi-State Vietnam Gold Star Bridges would be a "catastrophic earthquake". This statement was made before the 2008 Illinois earthquake. After the 5.2 earthquake hit, Kentucky Transportation Cabinet spokesman Keith Todd said that such a quake "would not be expected to cause damage to well-engineered structures." However, both bridges were inspected as a precaution. Aside from earthquakes, another particular concern is the presence of the two piers holding the three central spans on each bridge inside the river transit lanes. The bridges have been struck at least once every 5 years on average.

The bridges are located at 37°54'15" N, 87°33'02" W. Although they are not currently on the list, they have been ruled eligible for inclusion in the National Register of Historic Places.

== Future ==
The Kentucky Transportation Cabinet (KYTC) plans to reduce the US 41 bridges from two to one, which would be toll-free for local traffic, once the I-69 Ohio River Crossing (I-69 ORX) project is complete. Residents and local officials in Henderson and Evansville favor keeping both US 41 bridges without tolls, but state officials have stated that it would not be financially viable to maintain both US 41 bridges without tolls after the I-69 ORX is built. Like with the Clark Memorial Bridge and the Ohio River Bridges Project upriver in Louisville, Indiana and Kentucky also want to avoid a situation where the US 41 bridges become a toll free alternative for long-distance traffic.

== See also ==
- List of crossings of the Ohio River
- Henderson Bridge: a nearby rail bridge over the Ohio River
