= Greenup Lock and Dam =

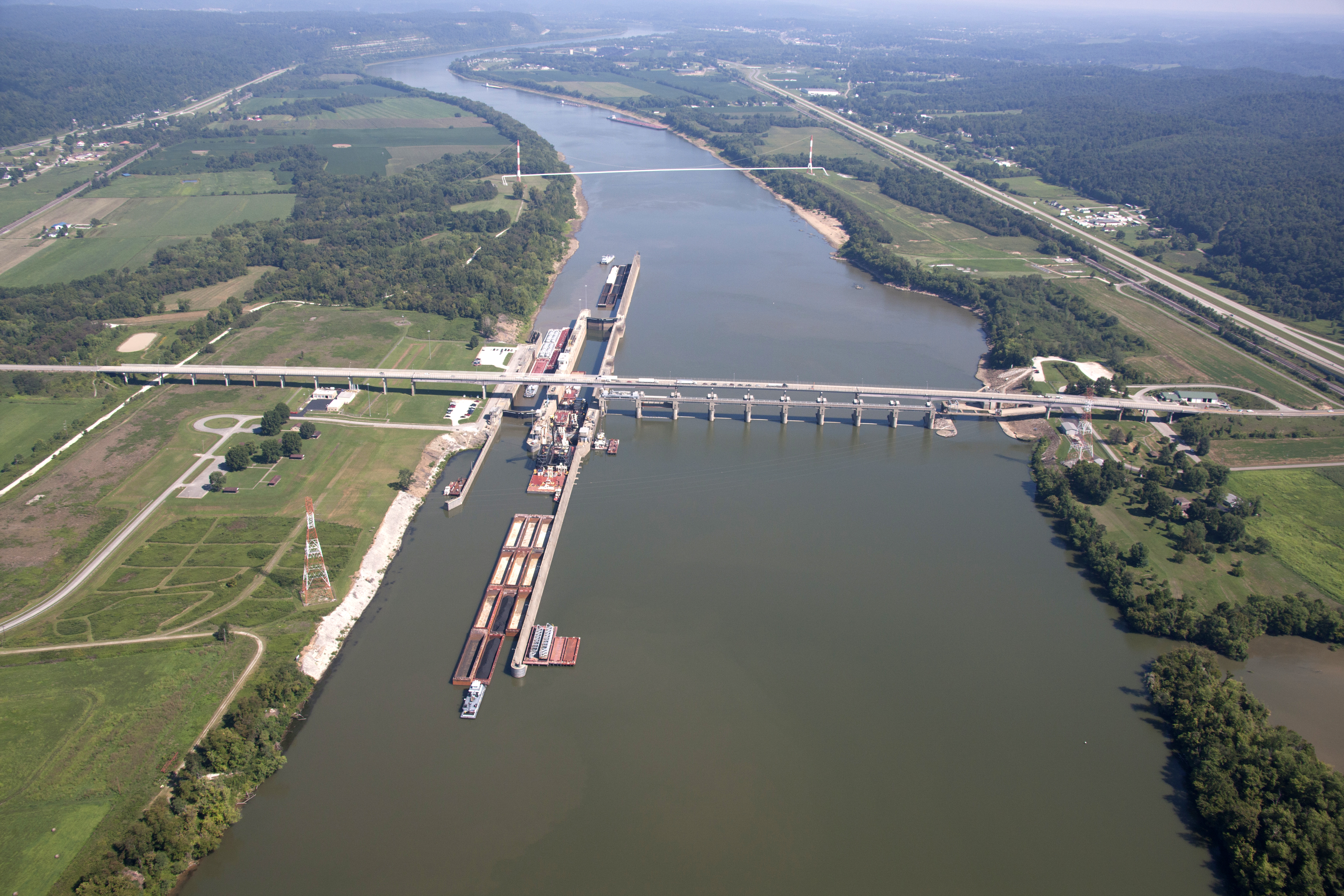
- Official name: Greenup Lock and Dam
- Location: Kentucky/Ohio border
- Coordinates: 38.6470°N 82.8587°W
- Construction began: 1954
- Opening date: 1962
- Construction cost: Lock Replacement $244,550,000; Dam Rehabilitation $46,700,000
- Operator(s): United States Army Corps of Engineers Huntington District

Dam and spillways
- Type of dam: 9 Tainter gates
- Impounds: Ohio River
- Length: 1,287 ft (392 m)

Reservoir
- Normal elevation: 515 ft (157 m) above sealevel

Power Station
- Operator(s): City of Hamilton
- Installed capacity: 70 MW

Greenup Lock and Dam is the eleventh lock and dam on the Ohio River, located 341 mi (549 km) downstream of Pittsburgh. There are two locks, one for commercial barge traffic which is 1,200 feet long by 110 feet wide (366 m × 34 m), and the auxiliary lock which is 600 feet long by 110 feet wide (183 m × 34 m).

== Gallery ==
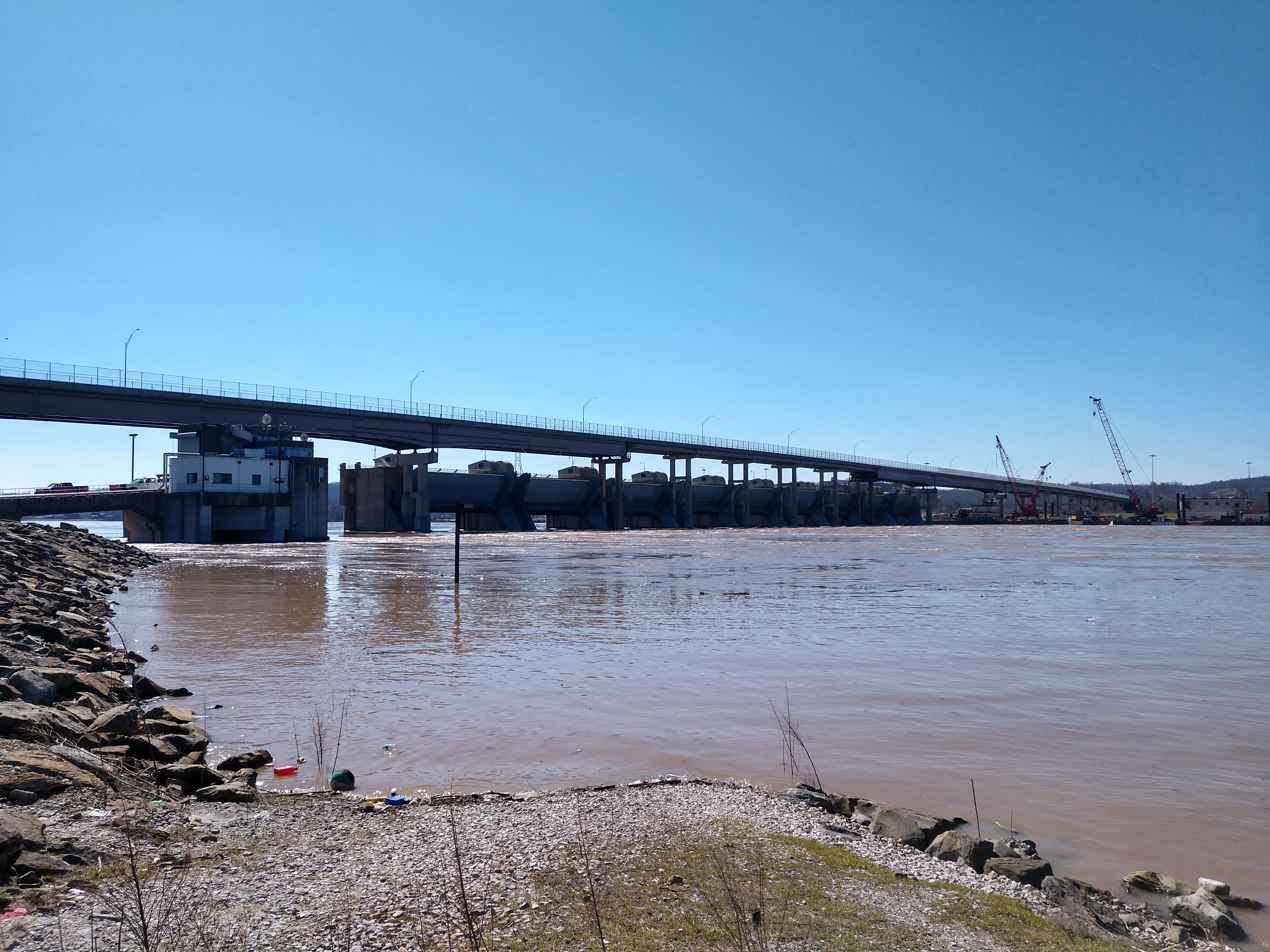
The Dam from the Ohio side with the Ohio River at 58 ft (18 m)

== See also ==
- List of locks and dams of the Ohio River
- List of locks and dams of the Upper Mississippi River
- Jesse Stuart Memorial Bridge, viaduct highway bridge that crosses over the Greenup Lock and Dam
