= List of dams and reservoirs in West Virginia =

Following is a list of dams and reservoirs in West Virginia.

All major dams are linked below. The National Inventory of Dams defines any "major dam" as being 50 feet (15 m) tall with a storage capacity of at least 5,000 acre-feet (6,200,000 m^{3}), or of any height with a storage capacity of 25,000 acre-feet (31,000,000 m^{3}).

== Dams and reservoirs in West Virginia ==
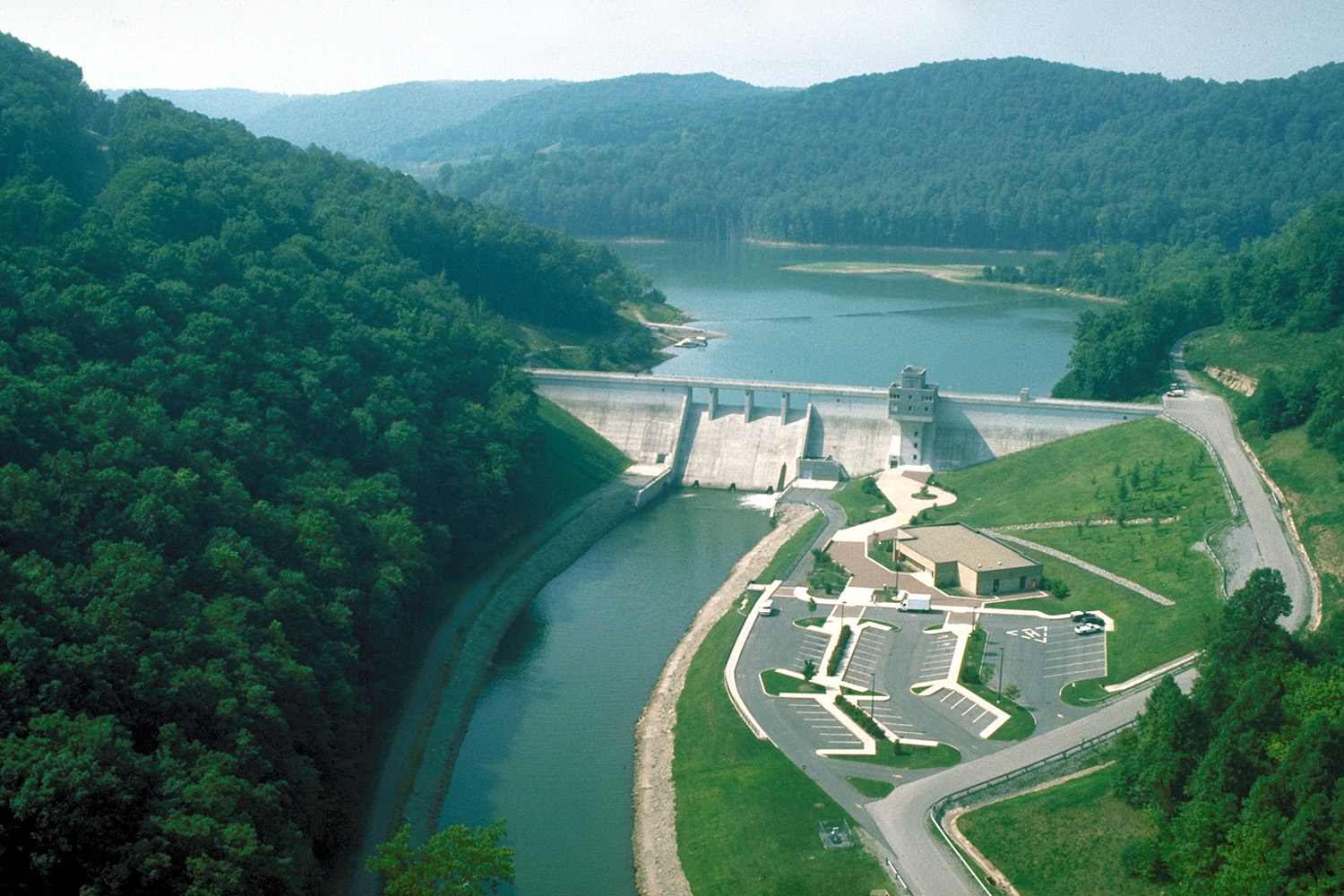
Stonewall Jackson Lake

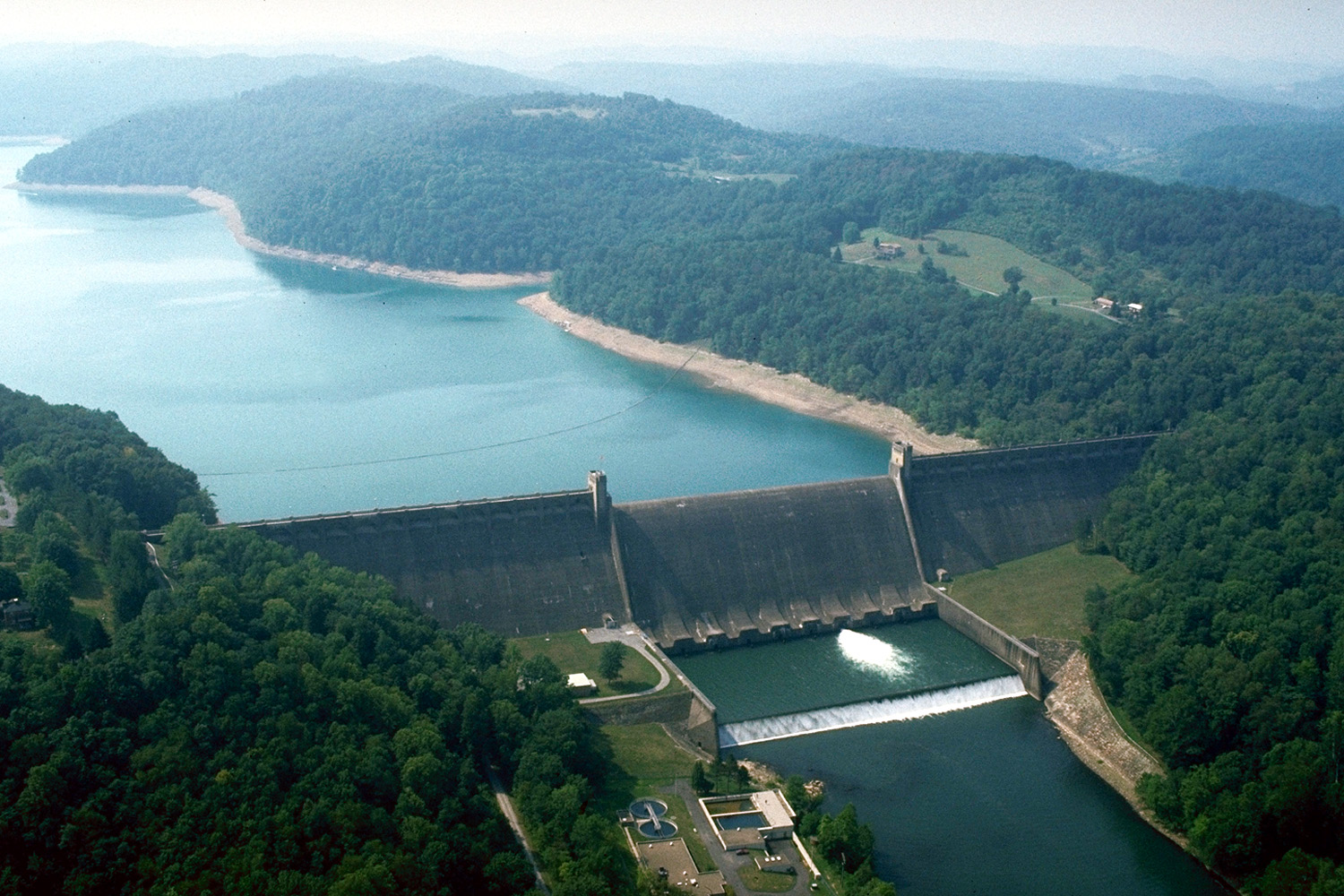
Tygart River Reservoir Dam

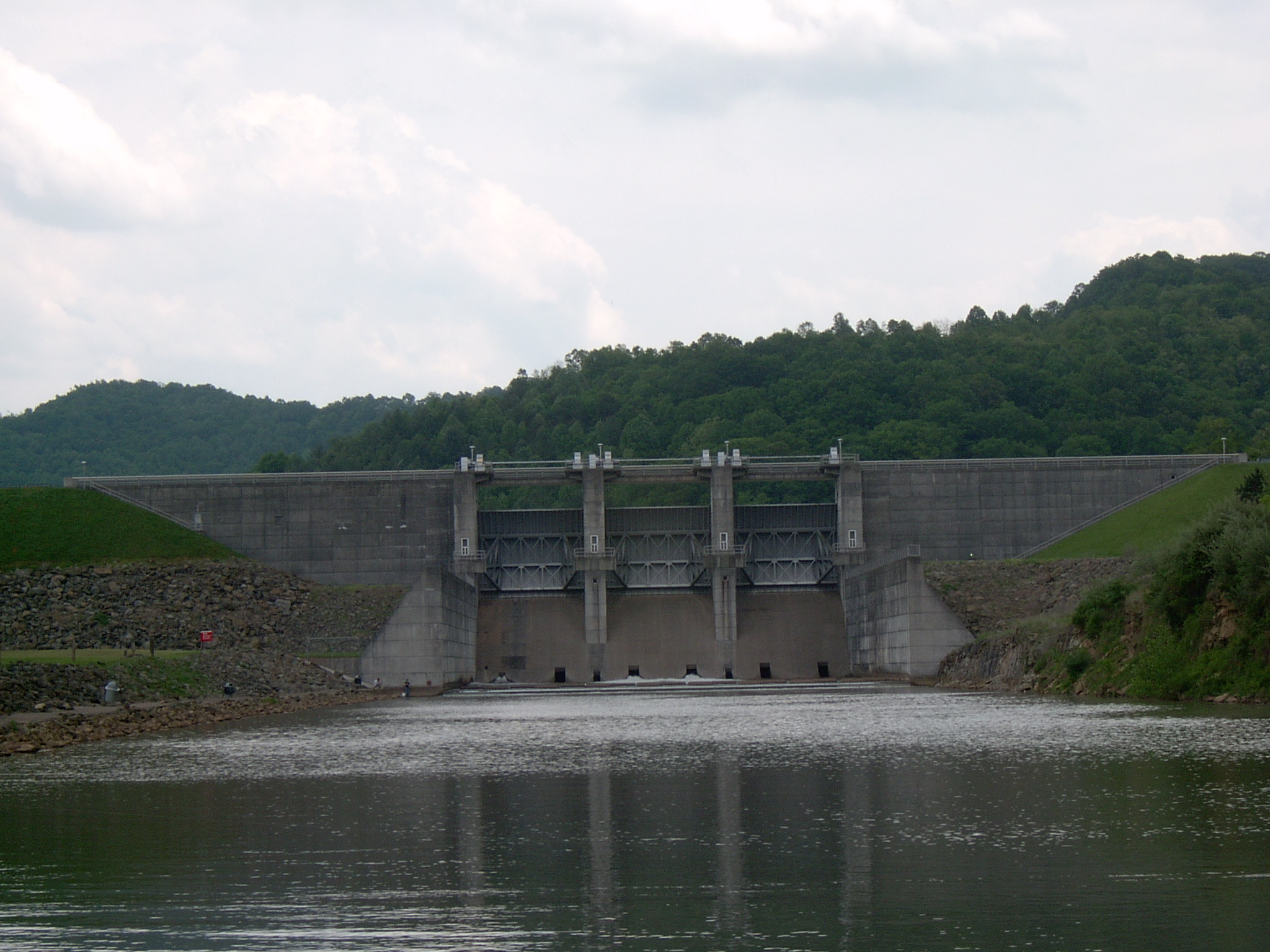
Burnsville Dam, Burnsville Lake

This list is incomplete. You can help Wikipedia by expanding it.

- Beech Fork Dam, Beech Fork Lake, United States Army Corps of Engineers
- Belleville Locks and Dam, on the Ohio River, USACE (on the Ohio border)
- Bluestone Dam, Bluestone Lake, USACE
- Brushy Fork Coal Impoundment
- Burnsville Dam, Burnsville Lake, USACE
- Cumberland Dam, unnamed reservoir on the Potomac River, privately owned (on Maryland border)
- East Lynn Dam, East Lynn Lake, USACE
- Hannibal Locks and Dam, on the Ohio River, USACE (on the Ohio border)
- Hildebrand Lock and Dam, on the Monongahela River, USACE
- Jennings Randolph Dam, Jennings Randolph Lake, USACE (on the Maryland border)
- Little Beaver Dam, Little Beaver Lake, West Virginia Division of Commerce
- London Locks and Dam, on the Kanawha River, USACE
- Marmet Locks and Dam, on the Kanawha River, USACE
- Morgantown Lock and Dam, on the Monongahela River, USACE
- New Cumberland Locks and Dam, on the Ohio River, USACE (on the Ohio border)
- Opekiska Lock and Dam, on the Monongahela River, USACE
- Pike Island Locks and Dam, on the Ohio River, USACE (on the Ohio border)
- Power Plant and Dam No. 4, unnamed reservoir on the Potomac River, privately owned (on Maryland border)
- Power Plant and Dam No. 5, unnamed reservoir on the Potomac River, privately owned (on Maryland border)
- R. D. Bailey Dam, R. D. Bailey Lake, USACE
- Racine Locks and Dam, on the Ohio River, USACE (on the Ohio border)
- Robert C. Byrd Lock and Dam, on the Ohio River, USACE (on the Ohio border)
- Stonewall Jackson Dam, Stonewall Jackson Lake, USACE
- Summersville Dam, Summersville Lake, USACE
- Sutton Dam, Sutton Lake, USACE
- Tygart River Reservoir Dam, Tygart River Reservoir, USACE
- Wells Lock and Dam, on the Little Kanawha River, USACE (closed)
- Willow Island Locks and Dam, on the Ohio River, USACE (on the Ohio border)
- Winfield Locks and Dam, on the Kanawha River, USACE

== See also ==
- List of dam removals in West Virginia
