= Belleville Lock and Dam =

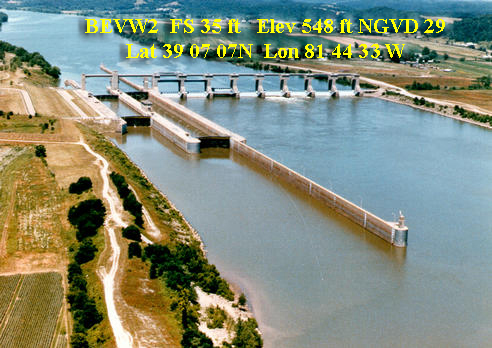
- Official name: Belleville Lock and Dam
- Location: Ohio/West Virginia border
- Coordinates: 39°07′08″N 81°44′27″W
- Construction began: 1962
- Opening date: 1968
- Construction cost: $62,231,500
- Operator: United States Army Corps of Engineers Huntington District

Dam and spillways
- Type of dam: Gated
- Impounds: Ohio River
- Length: 1,206 feet

Reservoir
- Normal elevation: 582 feet above sealevel

Power Station
- Installed capacity: 42 MW

Belleville Lock and Dam is the 8th Lock and dam on the Ohio River, located 204 miles downstream of Pittsburgh. There are two locks, one for commercial barge traffic that's 1,200 feet long by 110 feet wide, and the auxiliary lock is 600 feet long by 110 feet wide.

== See also ==
- List of locks and dams of the Ohio River
- List of locks and dams of the Upper Mississippi River
