= Dashields Locks and Dam =

Dashields Locks and Dam (formerly Deadman Island Locks and Dam)
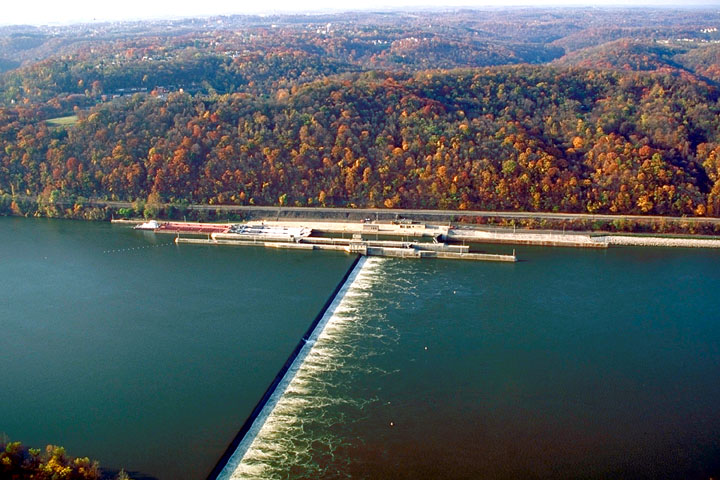
- Interactive map of Dashields Locks and Dam (formerly Deadman Island Locks and Dam)
- Official name: Dashields Locks and Dam
- Coordinates: 40.5506°N 80.2041°W
- Construction began: 1927
- Opening date: 1929
- Operator: United States Army Corps of Engineers Pittsburgh District

Dam and spillways
- Type of dam: fixed crest dam
- Impounds: Ohio River
- Length: 1,585 feet (483 m)

Reservoir
- Normal elevation: 692 feet (211 m) above sealevel

Dashields Lock and Dam is a fixed-crest dam on the Ohio River. It is located less than 15 miles (24 km) downstream of Pittsburgh. There are two locks, one for commercial barge traffic that is 600 feet (180 m) long by 110 feet (34 m) wide, and a recreational auxiliary lock that is 360 feet (110 m) long by 56 feet (17 m) wide. Dashields locks averages about 450 commercial lock throughs every month and 200 to 300 lock throughs a month on the recreational auxiliary lock.

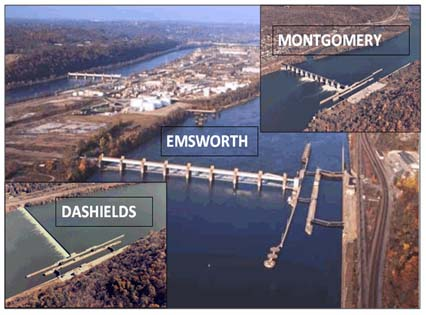
Emsworth, Dashields, and Montgomery lock and dams

== See also ==
- List of locks and dams of the Ohio River
- List of locks and dams of the Upper Mississippi River
