= Captain Anthony Meldahl Locks and Dam =

Coordinates: 38°47′50″N 84°10′14″W

- Country: United States
- Location: Bracken County, Kentucky / Clermont County, Ohio
- Construction began: April 1961 (dam)
- Opening date: December 1964 (dam)
- Operator(s): United States Army Corps of Engineers; Hamilton, Oh Utility Department (future electric plant)

Dam and spillways
- Impounds: Ohio River
- Length: 1,756 ft (535.2 m)

Power Station
- Installed capacity: 105 MW

The Captain Anthony Meldahl Locks and Dam is a non-navigable river control dam with an associated lock, located at mile marker 436 on the Ohio River. It was named for Captain Anthony Meldahl, a river captain.

The dam has a top length of 1,756 feet (535 m) with a 372-foot (113 m) fixed weir and a 310-foot (94 m) open crest. At normal pool elevation the length is 95 miles (153 km) upstream encompassing an area of 21,700 acres (88 km^{2}). The facility is operated by the United States Army Corps of Engineers.

A joint venture between Baker Concrete and Alberici Constructors built a three turbine hydroelectric plant and spillway addition to the Meldahl Locks and Dam With a generating capacity of 105 MW. The facility became fully operational in 2016.

== See also ==
- List of crossings of the Ohio River
- List of locks and dams of the Ohio River
