= Montgomery Locks and Dam =

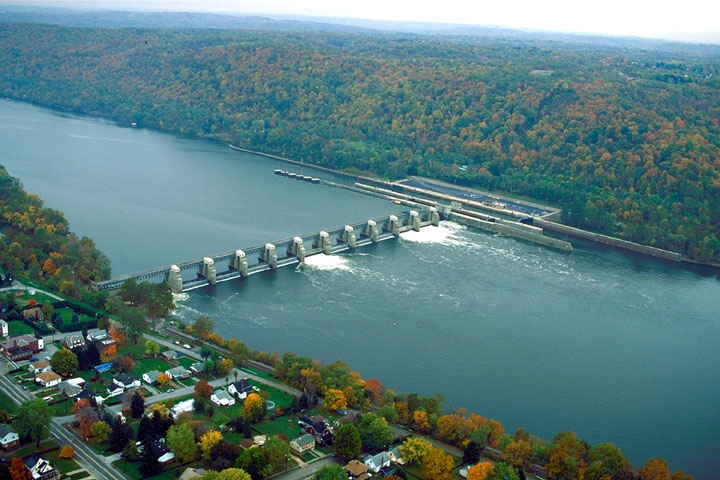
- Official name: Montgomery Locks and Dam
- Coordinates: 40.6503°N 80.3860°W
- Construction began: 1932
- Opening date: June 1936
- Operator(s): United States Army Corps of Engineers Pittsburgh District

Dam and spillways
- Type of dam: Gated
- Impounds: Ohio River
- Length: 1,379 feet

Reservoir
- Normal elevation: 682 feet above sealevel

The Montgomery Locks and Dam are part of a lock and dam system that is located on the Ohio River in the United States.

== History and notable features ==
Situated thirty-two miles downstream from the city of Pittsburgh, Pennsylvania, this lock and dam system has two locks, one for commercial barge traffic that is 600 feet long by 110 feet wide, and the other, which is a recreational auxiliary lock that is 360 feet long by 56 feet wide.

This system averages roughly 300 commercial lock throughs every month and 150 lock throughs a month on the recreational auxiliary lock. The average cost to keep the lock and dam operationally ready averaged $5.8 million per year between 2010 and 2014.

== Gallery ==
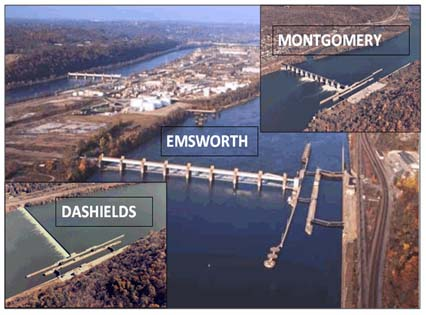
Emsworth, Dashields, and Montgomery lock and dams

== See also ==
- List of locks and dams of the Ohio River
- List of locks and dams of the Upper Mississippi River
