= Racine Lock and Dam =

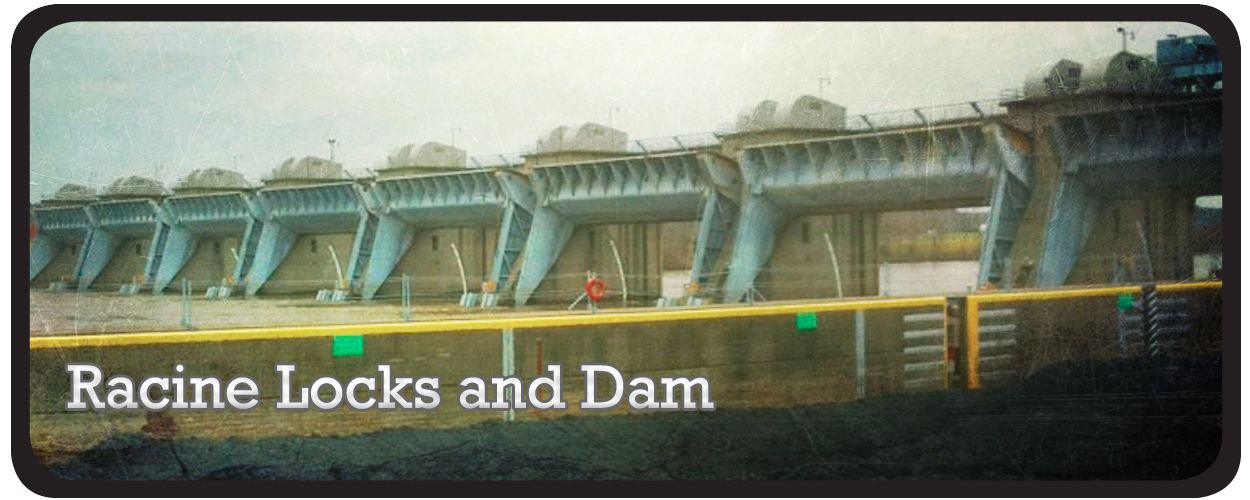
- Official name: Racine Lock and Dam
- Location: Ohio/West Virginia border
- Coordinates: 38.9164°N 81.9101°W
- Construction began: 1964
- Opening date: 1971
- Construction cost: $64,882,900
- Operator: United States Army Corps of Engineers Huntington District

Dam and spillways
- Type of dam: 8 Tainter gates
- Impounds: Ohio River
- Length: 1,173 feet

Reservoir
- Normal elevation: 560 feet above sealevel

Power Station
- Operator: American Electric Power Company
- Installed capacity: 24 MW

Racine Lock and Dam is the ninth lock and dam on the Ohio River. It is located 238 miles downstream from Pittsburgh. There are two locks, one for commercial barge traffic 1,200 feet long by 110 feet wide, and the auxiliary lock, which is 600 feet long by 110 feet wide.

== See also ==
- List of locks and dams of the Ohio River
- List of locks and dams of the Upper Mississippi River
