= New Cumberland Locks and Dam =

New Cumberland Lock and Dam
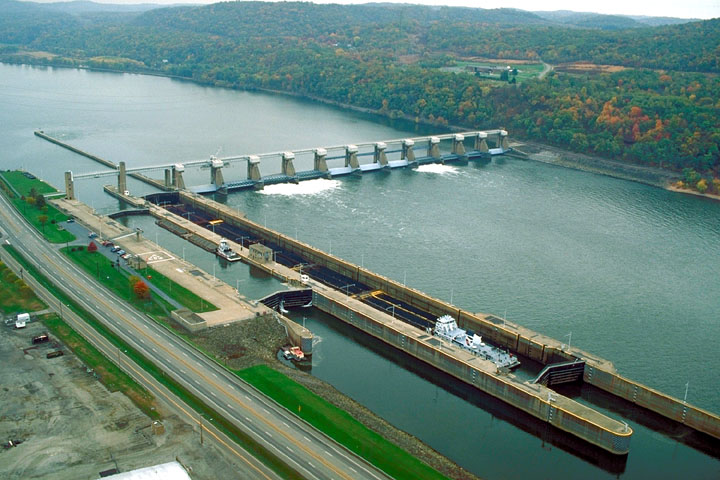
- Official name: New Cumberland Locks and Dam
- Location: Ohio/West Virginia border
- Coordinates: 40.5281°N 80.6259°W
- Construction began: 1955
- Opening date: 1961
- Operator: United States Army Corps of Engineers Pittsburgh District

Dam and spillways
- Type of dam: Gated
- Impounds: Ohio River

Reservoir
- Normal elevation: 664 feet above sealevel

New Cumberland Lock and Dam is the fourth lock and dam on the Ohio River, located 54 miles downstream of Pittsburgh. There are two locks, one for commercial barge traffic that's 1,200 feet long by 110 feet wide, and the recreational auxiliary lock is 600 feet long by 110 feet wide. New Cumberland locks averages about 320 commercial lock throughs every month and 120 lock throughs a month on the recreational auxiliary lock.

== See also ==
- List of locks and dams of the Ohio River
- List of locks and dams of the Upper Mississippi River
