= List of variant names of the Ohio River =

This is a list of historical names for the Ohio River, or portions thereof, as compiled by the Geographic Names Information System of the United States Geological Survey. The Board on Geographic Names settled on "Ohio River" as the river's official name in 1931, but the Decision Card, submitted on December 31, 1930, and approved on October 7, 1931, states that naming it the Ohio river was a "Restatement of previous decision"

- Aaboukingon
- Akansea River
- Alagany River
- River Allegane
- Allegany River
- Allegeny River
- Alleghany River
- Alliganey River (See also Allegheny River)
- Baudrane River
- Bella Ribera
- Belle-Rivière
- La Belle Riviere
- LaBelle Riviere
- Cau-si-sip-i-on-e
- Fleuve Chucagoa
- Cubach
- Dono
- Eagle River
- Fair River
- Hohio River
- Kan-zan-za River
- Ki-to-no
- Kis-ke-ba-la-se-be River
- Kis-ke-pi-la-se-pe River
- Kiskepila Sepe
- Kottono-cepe
- Ochio
- Oheeo
- O-hee-yo
- Oheezuh
- O-he-zun River
- O-he-zun-River
- O-he-zun-an-de-wa River
- Ohi
- Ohio
- Il Fiume Ohio
- Ohionhiio
- Ohiopeckhanne
- Ohiople
- O-H-I-o-ple
- O-h-i-o-ple
- O-li-gen-si-pen
- Olighin-cipou River
- Ouabache
- La Riviere Ouabache (See also Wabash River)
- Ouabouskigon
- Oyeu River
- Oyo
- O-Yo
- L'Oyo Riviere
- La Riviere Oyo
- Oyo-peck-han-ne
- Pa-la-wa-the pee River
- Palawa Thepiki
- Sabsquigs River
- Fleuve Saint Louis
- Sault River
- Splawacipiki River
- Turkey River

== Sources ==
- U.S. Geological Survey Geographic Names Information System: Ohio River
