= List of locks and dams of the Ohio River =

This is a list of locks and dams of the Ohio River, which begins at the confluence of the Allegheny and Monongahela rivers at The Point in Pittsburgh, Pennsylvania and ends at the confluence of the Ohio River and the Mississippi River, in Cairo, Illinois.

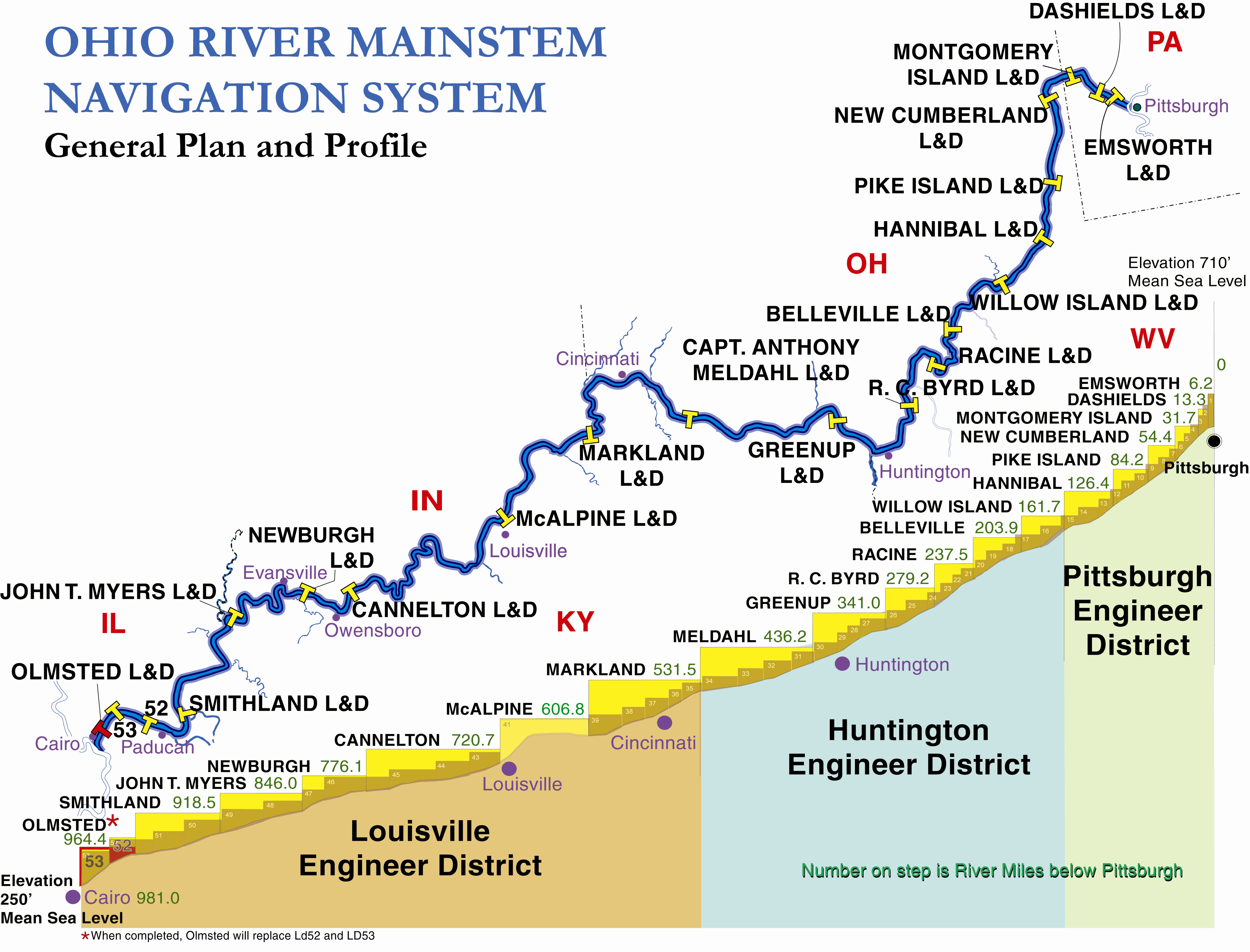
A map and diagram of U.S. Army Corps of Engineers operated locks and dams on the Ohio River.

== Evolution of navigation on the Ohio River ==
In the early days of steamboat navigation on the Ohio River the major physical hurdle that delayed travel was the Falls of the Ohio near Louisville, Kentucky. Steamboats could only maneuver over the falls during times of high water, which were not consistent. It was more practical for the steamboats to drop off passengers and freight on one end of the falls and transport them over land to the opposite end of the falls to another steamboat. This resulted in Louisville becoming a customary last stop for vessels on both legs of the Ohio. If a steamboat desired to travel unimpeded through the falls without waiting for high water, a canal and lock system was needed in order to circumvent the falls.

In 1825, construction began on that canal, and by 1830 the privately financed Louisville and Portland Canal was finished. The canal was constructed by hand tools with the help of animal-drawn scrappers and carts. The completed canal was two miles long with three locking chambers that created a total lift of 26 feet.

=== Canalization ===
The amount of coal transported down river from Pittsburgh jumped greatly following the Civil War. The size of the tows also grew with the amount of coal hauled. Due to the escalating coal trade, the US Army Corps of Engineers began studying methods to produce a reliable navigation depth on the Ohio. The Corps launched an international study to analyze other navigation projects worldwide. They determined that building a system of locks and dams to form pools was the best solution to the problem.

Following the opening of the lock and dam at Davis Island in 1885, the venture proved to be worthy. In 1910, the Rivers and Harbors Act was authorized by Congress. The Act allowed the production of a system of locks and dams along the Ohio. In 1929, the canalization project on the Ohio River was finished. The project produced 51 wooden wicket dams and 600 foot by 110 foot lock chambers along the length of the river.

During the 1940s, a shift from steam propelled to diesel powered towboats allowed for tows longer than the 600 foot locks on the river. This meant barges had to be locked in two phases. This operation was dangerous and time-consuming. It backed up river traffic and increased expenses for the towing industry. The Corps initiated the Ohio River Navigation Modernization Program in the 1950s. The program's purpose was to replace the system of outdated wicket dams and small locks. The new dams were non-navigable and made of concrete and steel. Each dam has two adjoining locks, one 600-foot by 110-foot chamber, and a 1,200-foot by 110-foot chamber to accommodate fifteen barges that can lock through in one maneuver.

== Key ==
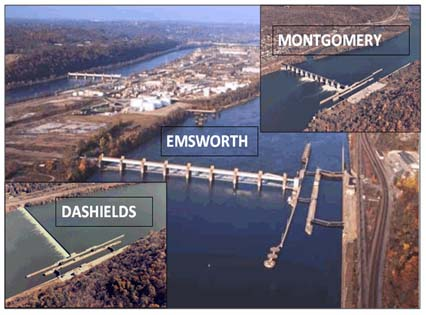
Emsworth, Dashields, and Montgomery lock and dams

Dam produces hydroelectricity.
Replacement lock/dam facility.
Locks and/or dam are in the process of being replaced.
Locks and/or dam have been removed.

RDB	Right Descending Bank
LDB	Left Descending Bank

== Downstream, Pittsburgh to Olmsted ==
Locks & Dam	Location^{[L]}	Coordinates	River Mile	Lock Side	Lock Lift/Drop (in feet)	Pool Elevation (feet above sea level)	Pool Length (miles)
=== Pennsylvania ===
Emsworth Locks and Dam	Pittsburgh, Pennsylvania	40.50427°N 80.08892°W	6.2	RDB	18	710	6.2+
Dashields Locks and Dam	Coraopolis, Pennsylvania	40.54892°N 80.20592°W	13.3	LDB	10	692	7.1
Montgomery Locks and Dam	Monaca, Pennsylvania	40.64857°N 80.38546°W	31.7	LDB	18	682	18.4
=== Ohio – West Virginia ===
New Cumberland Locks and Dam	Stratton, Ohio	40.52766°N 80.62763°W	54.3	RDB	21	664	22.6
Pike Island Locks and Dam	Wheeling, West Virginia	40.14983°N 80.70115°W	84.2	LDB	21	644	29.9
Hannibal Locks and Dam	Hannibal, Ohio	39.66706°N 80.86534°W	126.4	RDB	21	623	42.2
Willow Island Lock and Dam	Newport, Ohio	39.36048°N 81.32041°W	161.7	RDB	20	602	35.3
Belleville Lock and Dam	Reedsville, Ohio	39.11881°N 81.74244°W	203.9	RDB	22	582	42.2
Racine Lock and Dam	Letart, West Virginia	38.91735°N 81.91162°W	237.5	LDB	22	560	33.6
Robert C. Byrd Lock and Dam	Gallipolis Ferry, West Virginia	38.68156°N 82.18829°W	279.2	LDB	23	538	41.7
=== Ohio – Kentucky ===
Greenup Lock and Dam	Greenup, Kentucky	38.64684°N 82.86077°W	341.0	LDB	30	515	61.8
Captain Anthony Meldahl Locks and Dam	Foster, Kentucky	38.79720°N 84.17050°W	436.2	RDB	30	485	95.2
=== Indiana – Kentucky ===
Markland Locks and Dam	Warsaw, Kentucky	38.77446°N 84.96487°W	531.5	LDB	35	455	95.3
McAlpine Locks and Dam	Louisville, Kentucky	38.28280°N 85.78130°W	606.8	LDB	37	420	75.3
Cannelton Locks and Dam	Cannelton, Indiana	37.89990°N 86.70590°W	720.7	RDB	25	383	113.9
Newburgh Lock and Dam	Newburgh, Indiana	37.93090°N 87.37220°W	776.1	RDB	16	358	55.4
John T. Myers Locks and Dam	Mt. Vernon, Indiana	37.79350°N 87.99090°W	846.0	RDB	18	342	69.9
=== Illinois – Kentucky ===
Smithland Lock and Dam	Hamletsburg, Illinois	37.16560°N 88.43090°W	918.5	RDB	22	324	72.5
Lock and Dam Number 52 (Removed)	Brookport, Illinois	37.12644°N 88.65331°W	938.9	RDB	12	302	20.4
Lock and Dam Number 53 (Removed)	Grand Chain, Illinois	37.203398°N 89.041941°W	962	RDB	≤17	290	23.7
Olmsted Locks and Dam (Replaced 52 and 53)	Olmsted, Illinois	37.18380°N 89.06350°W	964.4	RDB	≤30	--	46.0

== Footnotes ==
- ^{L} Locations may be the nearest city or town to the locks and dam and not their actual geographical location.

== See also ==
- List of crossings of the Ohio River
- List of locks and dams of the Upper Mississippi River
- United States Army Corps of Engineers
