= Pike Island Locks and Dam =

Pike Island Lock and Dam
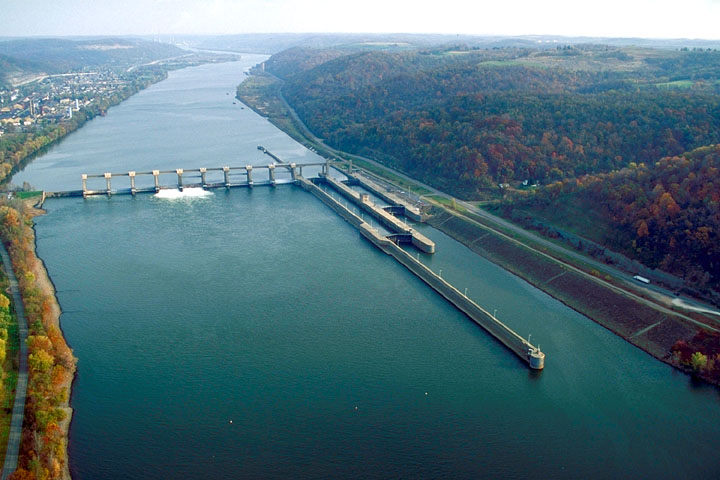
- Interactive map of Pike Island Lock and Dam
- Official name: Pike Island Lock and Dam
- Location: Yorkville, Ohio
- Coordinates: 40.1504°N 80.7034°W
- Construction began: 1959
- Opening date: November 1963
- Operator: United States Army Corps of Engineers Pittsburgh District

Dam and spillways
- Type of dam: Gated
- Impounds: Ohio River

Reservoir
- Normal elevation: 644 feet above sealevel

Pike Island Lock and Dam is the fifth lock and dam on the Ohio River, located in Yorkville, Ohio 84 miles downstream of Pittsburgh. There are two locks, one for commercial barge traffic that's 1,200 feet long by 110 feet wide, and the auxiliary lock is 600 feet long by 110 feet wide.

== See also ==
- List of locks and dams of the Ohio River
- List of locks and dams of the Upper Mississippi River
