= Newburgh Lock and Dam =

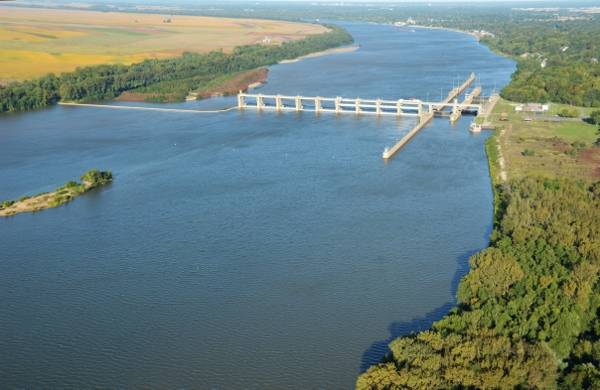
- Interactive map of Newburgh Lock and Dam
- Location: Indiana/Kentucky border
- Coordinates: 37.9294°N 87.3734°W
- Construction began: June 1966
- Opening date: 1975
- Operator: United States Army Corps of Engineers Louisville District

Dam and spillways
- Type of dam: Concrete fixed weir with 9 Tainter gates
- Impounds: Ohio River
- Length: 2,275 feet (693 m)

Reservoir
- Normal elevation: 358 feet (109 m)

Newburgh Lock and Dam is the 16th lock and dam on the Ohio River, located 776 miles (1,249 km) down stream of Pittsburgh.There are two locks. The main lock for commercial barge traffic that is 1,200 feet (370 m) long by 110 feet (34 m) wide, and the auxiliary lock is 600 feet (180 m) by 110 feet (34 m) wide.

== History ==
Newburgh Lock and Dam replaced lock and dams 46 and 47 on the Ohio river.

== See also ==
- List of locks and dams of the Ohio River
- List of locks and dams of the Upper Mississippi River
