= Smithland Lock and Dam =

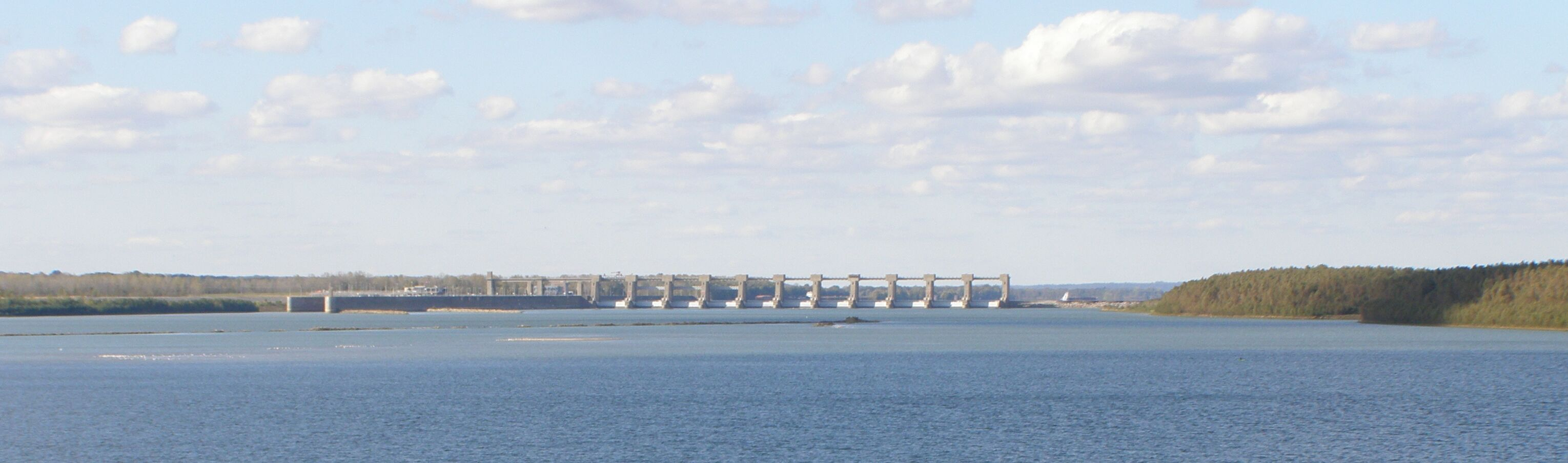
- Location: Kentucky/Illinois border
- Coordinates: 37.1664°N 88.4284°W
- Construction began: 1971
- Opening date: 1980
- Operator(s): United States Army Corps of Engineers Louisville District

Dam and spillways
- Type of dam: Concrete fixed weir with 11 Tainter gates
- Impounds: Ohio River
- Length: 2,951 feet

Reservoir
- Normal elevation: 324 feet above sealevel

Smithland Lock and Dam is the 18th lock and dam on the Ohio River, 919 miles down stream of Pittsburgh and 63 miles upstream from the confluence of the Mississippi with the Ohio. There are 2 locks for commercial barge traffic that are 1,200 feet long by 110 feet wide.

== History ==
Smithland lock and dam was authorized in 1965 to replace lock and dam 50 and 51 on the Ohio River.

== See also ==
- List of locks and dams of the Ohio River
- List of locks and dams of the Upper Mississippi River
