= List of dam removals in West Virginia =

This is a list of dams in West Virginia that have been removed as physical impediments to free-flowing rivers or streams.

== Completed removals ==
Dam	Height	Year removed	Location	Watercourse	Watershed
Appalachian Lake Dam	15 ft (4.6 m)	2019	Preston County; 39.7133°N 79.4967°W	Fike Run	Cheat River
Brumfield Dam (Tyler Farm Pond Dam)		2019	Salt Rock; 38.3311°N 82.1889°W	Tributary to Tyler Creek	Guyandotte River
Highland Dam	13.5 ft (4.1 m)	2016	Harrison County; 39.221°N 80.377°W	West Fork River	West Fork River
Two Lick Dam	10.5 ft (3.2 m)	2016	Harrison County; 39.239°N 80.358°W	West Fork River	West Fork River
West Milford Dam	8 ft (2.4 m)	2016	West Milford; 39.198°N 80.406°W	West Fork River	West Fork River

== See also ==
- List of dam removals in Maryland
- List of dam removals in Virginia
