= Willow Island Lock and Dam =

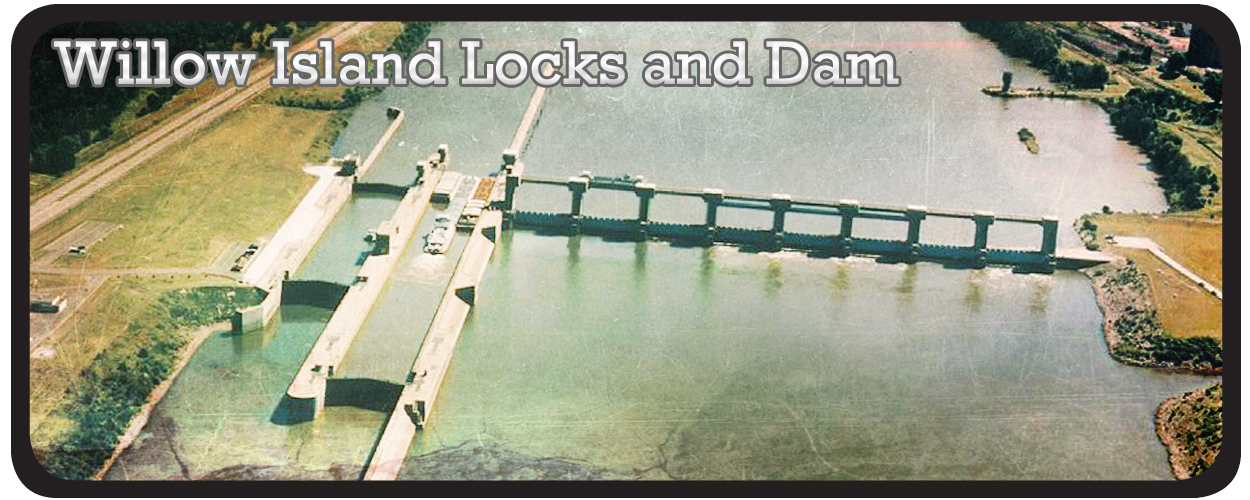
- Official name: Willow Island Lock and Dam
- Location: Ohio/West Virginia border
- Coordinates: 39.3593°N 81.3193°W
- Construction began: 1967
- Opening date: 1976
- Construction cost: $76,520,800
- Operator: United States Army Corps of Engineers Huntington District

Dam and spillways
- Type of dam: Gated
- Impounds: Ohio River
- Length: 1,128 feet

Reservoir
- Normal elevation: 602 feet above sealevel

Willow Island Lock and Dam is the 7th Lock and dam on the Ohio River, located 162 miles downstream of Pittsburgh. There are two locks, one for commercial barge traffic that's 1,200 feet long by 110 feet wide, and the auxiliary lock is 600 feet long by 110 feet wide.

== See also ==
- List of locks and dams of the Ohio River
- List of locks and dams of the Upper Mississippi River
