= Hannibal Locks and Dam =

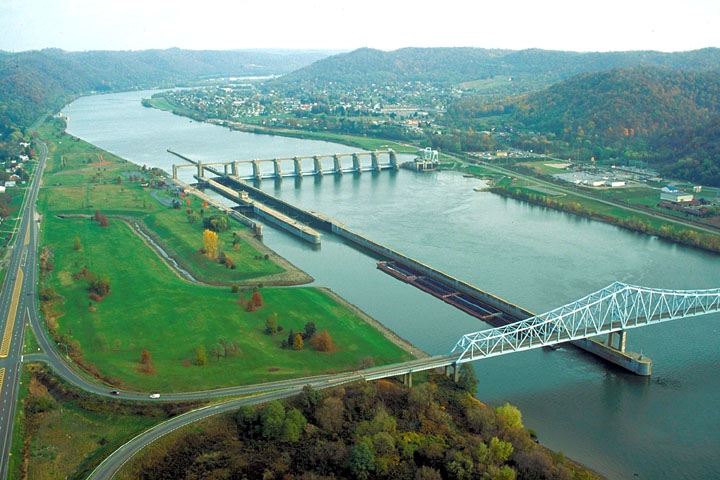
- Official name: Hannibal Locks and Dam
- Location: Hannibal, Ohio, / New Martinsville, West Virginia
- Coordinates: 39.667003°N 80.865905°W
- Construction began: 1967
- Opening date: 1975
- Operator: United States Army Corps of Engineers Pittsburgh District

Dam and spillways
- Impounds: Ohio River
- Length: 1,403 feet (428 m)
- Width (base): 1,100 feet (340 m)

Power Station
- Operator: City of New Martinsville
- Installed capacity: 37.4 MW

The Hannibal Locks and Dam are a United States Army Corps of Engineers concrete locks and lift gate dam, located at river mile marker 126.4 on the Ohio River at Hannibal, Ohio and New Martinsville, West Virginia. The locks and dam were built to replace the wicket-type locks and dams Number 12, 13 and 14. Construction on the locks was started in 1967 and completed in 1972. Construction on the dams was started in 1970 and completed in 1975.

A 37.4 MW hydroelectric power plant is located on the left descending bank of the Ohio River at New Martinsville, West Virginia, abutted to the dam. The power plant is owned and operated by the City of New Martinsville.

An observation tower, along with public-use areas, picnic shelters and restroom facilities are available to groups and individuals during daylight hours, seven days a week.

== See also ==
- List of locks and dams of the Ohio River
- List of crossings of the Ohio River
