= Ohio River =

Major river in the Eastern United States

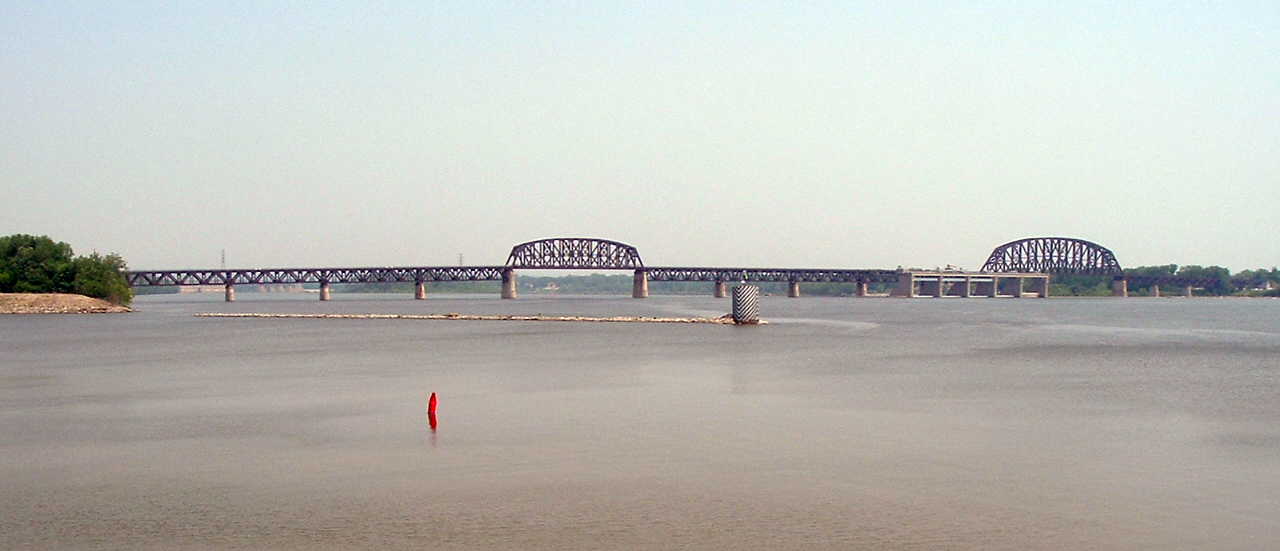
- The widest point on the Ohio River is just north of downtown Louisville, where it is 1 mile (1.6 km) wide. Indiana is on the right towards the flood gates, Kentucky on the left, towards the locks. The jetty on the left is the entrance to the Louisville and Portland Canal.

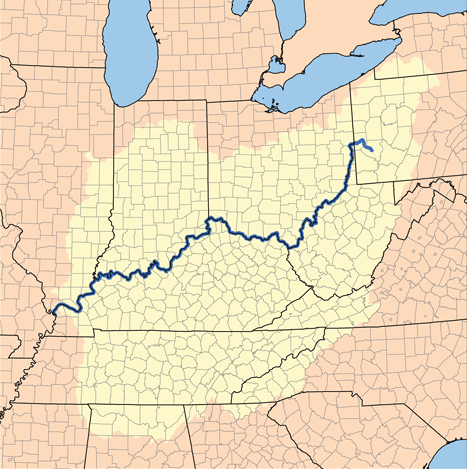
- Ohio River basin
- Native name: Ohi:yoʼ (Seneca)

Location
- Country: United States
- States: Pennsylvania, Ohio, West Virginia, Kentucky, Indiana, Illinois
- Cities: Pittsburgh, PA; East Liverpool, OH; Steubenville, OH; Wheeling, WV; Parkersburg, WV; Huntington, WV; Ashland, KY; Portsmouth, OH; Cincinnati, OH; Louisville, KY; Owensboro, KY; Evansville, IN; Henderson, KY; Mount Vernon, IN; Paducah, KY; Cairo, IL

Physical characteristics
- Source: Allegheny River
  - location: Allegany Township, PA
  - coordinates: 41°52′22″N 77°52′30″W
  - elevation: 2,240 ft (680 m)
- 2nd source: Monongahela River
  - location: Fairmont, WV
  - coordinates: 39°27′53″N 80°09′13″W
  - elevation: 880 ft (270 m)
- Source confluence
  - location: Pittsburgh, PA
  - coordinates: 40°26′32″N 80°00′52″W
  - elevation: 730 ft (220 m)
- Mouth: Mississippi River
  - location: at Cairo, IL
  - coordinates: 36°59′12″N 89°07′50″W
  - elevation: 290 ft (88 m)
- Length: 981 mi (1,579 km)
- Basin size: 203,940 mi^{2} (528,200 km^{2})
- Discharge
  - location: Cairo, IL
  - average: (Period: 1951–1980) 281,000 cu ft/s (8,000 m^{3}/s)
- Discharge
  - location: Olmsted, IL
  - average: (Period: 2013–2023) 338,000 cu ft/s (9,600 m^{3}/s)
  - minimum: 40,300 cu ft/s (1,140 m^{3}/s) (2016/10/14)
  - maximum: 1,240,000 cu ft/s (35,000 m^{3}/s) (2019/02/24)
- Discharge
  - location: Metropolis, IL
  - average: (Period: 1928–2014) 279,100 cu ft/s (7,900 m^{3}/s)
  - minimum: 15,000 cu ft/s (420 m^{3}/s) (1930/07/20)
  - maximum: 1,850,000 cu ft/s (52,000 m^{3}/s) (1937/02/01)
- Discharge
  - location: Louisville, KY
  - average: (Period: 1929–2020) 120,800 cu ft/s (3,420 m^{3}/s)
  - minimum: 877 cu ft/s (24.8 m^{3}/s) (2010/09/21)
  - maximum: 1,110,000 cu ft/s (31,000 m^{3}/s) (1937/01/27)
- Discharge
  - location: Greater Pittsburgh
  - average: (Period: 1934–2023) 34,020 cu ft/s (963 m^{3}/s)
  - minimum: 2,100 cu ft/s (59 m^{3}/s) (1957/09/04)
  - maximum: 574,000 cu ft/s (16,300 m^{3}/s) (1936/03/18)

Basin features
- Progression: Mississippi River → Gulf of Mexico
- Tributaries
  - left: Little Kanawha River, Kanawha River, Guyandotte River, Big Sandy River, Little Sandy River, Licking River, Kentucky River, Salt River, Green River, Cumberland River, Tennessee River
  - right: Beaver River, Little Muskingum River, Muskingum River, Little Hocking River, Hocking River, Shade River, Scioto River, Little Miami River, Great Miami River, Wabash River

The Ohio River (Seneca: Ohi:yoʼ) is a 981-mile-long (1,579 km) river in the United States. It begins in the Northeast and serves as the boundary between the Midwestern and Southern United States, flowing in a southwesterly direction from Pittsburgh, Pennsylvania, to its mouth on the Mississippi River at Cairo, Illinois. It is the third largest river by discharge volume in the United States and the largest tributary by volume of the Mississippi River. It is also the sixth oldest river on the North American continent. The river flows through or along the border of six states, and its drainage basin includes parts of 14 states. Through its largest tributary, the Tennessee River, the basin includes several states of the southeastern United States. It is the source of drinking water for five million people.

The river became a primary transportation route for pioneers during the westward expansion of the early U.S. The lower Ohio River just below Louisville was obstructed by rapids known as the Falls of the Ohio where the elevation falls 26 feet (7.9 m) in 2 miles (3.2 km) restricting larger commercial navigation, although in the 18th and early 19th century its three deepest channels could be traversed by a wide variety of craft then in use. In 1830, the Louisville and Portland Canal (now the McAlpine Locks and Dam) bypassed the rapids, allowing even larger commercial and modern navigation from the Forks of the Ohio at Pittsburgh to the Port of New Orleans at the mouth of the Mississippi on the Gulf of Mexico. Since the "canalization" of the river in 1929, the Ohio has not been a natural free-flowing river; today, it is divided into 21 discrete pools or reservoirs by 20 locks and dams for navigation and power generation.

The name "Ohio" comes from the Seneca word Ohi:yoʼ, meaning "good river". In his Notes on the State of Virginia published in 1781–82, Thomas Jefferson stated: "The Ohio is the most beautiful river on earth. Its current gentle, waters clear, and bosom smooth and unbroken by rocks and rapids, a single instance only excepted."

After the French and Indian War, Britain's trans-Appalachian Indian Reserve was divided by the river into colonial lands to the south and Native American lands to the north, but later becoming part of the British Province of Quebec. During the American Revolution in 1778, militia crossed the river to take it from the British. In the late 18th century, the river became the southern boundary of the U.S. Northwest Territory. The river was in the early 19th century considered the western extension of the Mason–Dixon line that divided Pennsylvania from Maryland, and thus part of the border between free and slave territory, and between the Northern and Southern United States or Upland South. Where the river was narrow, it was crossed by thousands of slaves escaping to the North for freedom; many were helped by free blacks and whites of the Underground Railroad resistance movement.

The Ohio River is a climatic transition area, as its water runs along the periphery of the humid continental and humid subtropical climate areas. It is inhabited by fauna and flora of both climates. During winter, it regularly freezes over in Pittsburgh but rarely farther south towards Cincinnati and Louisville. Further down the river in places like Owensboro and Paducah, closer to its confluence with the Mississippi, the Ohio is ice-free year-round.

Today, the Ohio River is one of the most polluted rivers in the United States. The Ohio has faced significant industrial pollution historically along with farm runoff.

== Etymology ==
The name "Ohio" derives from the Seneca word Ohi:yoʼ (roughly pronounced oh-HEE-yoh, with the vowel in "hee" held longer), a proper name derived from ohiːyoːh ("good river"). "Great river" and "large creek" have also been given as translations.

Native Americans, including the Lenape and Haudenosaunee, considered the Ohio and Allegheny rivers as the same, as is suggested by a New York State road sign on Interstate 86 that refers to the Allegheny River also as Ohi:yoʼ. Similarly, the Geographic Names Information System lists O-hee-yo and O-hi-o as variant names for the Allegheny.

An earlier Miami-Illinois language name was also applied to the Ohio River, Mosopeleacipi ("river of the Mosopelea" tribe). Shortened in the Shawnee language to pelewa thiipi, spelewathiipi or peleewa thiipiiki, the name evolved through variant forms such as "Polesipi", "Peleson", "Pele Sipi" and "Pere Sipi", and eventually stabilized to the variant spellings "Pelisipi", "Pelisippi" and "Pellissippi". Originally applied just to the Ohio River, the "Pelisipi" name later was variously applied back and forth between the Ohio River and the Clinch River in Virginia and Tennessee. In his original draft of the Land Ordinance of 1784, Thomas Jefferson proposed a new state called "Pelisipia", to the south of the Ohio River, which would have included parts of present-day Eastern Kentucky, Virginia and West Virginia.

== History ==
=== Indigenous use ===
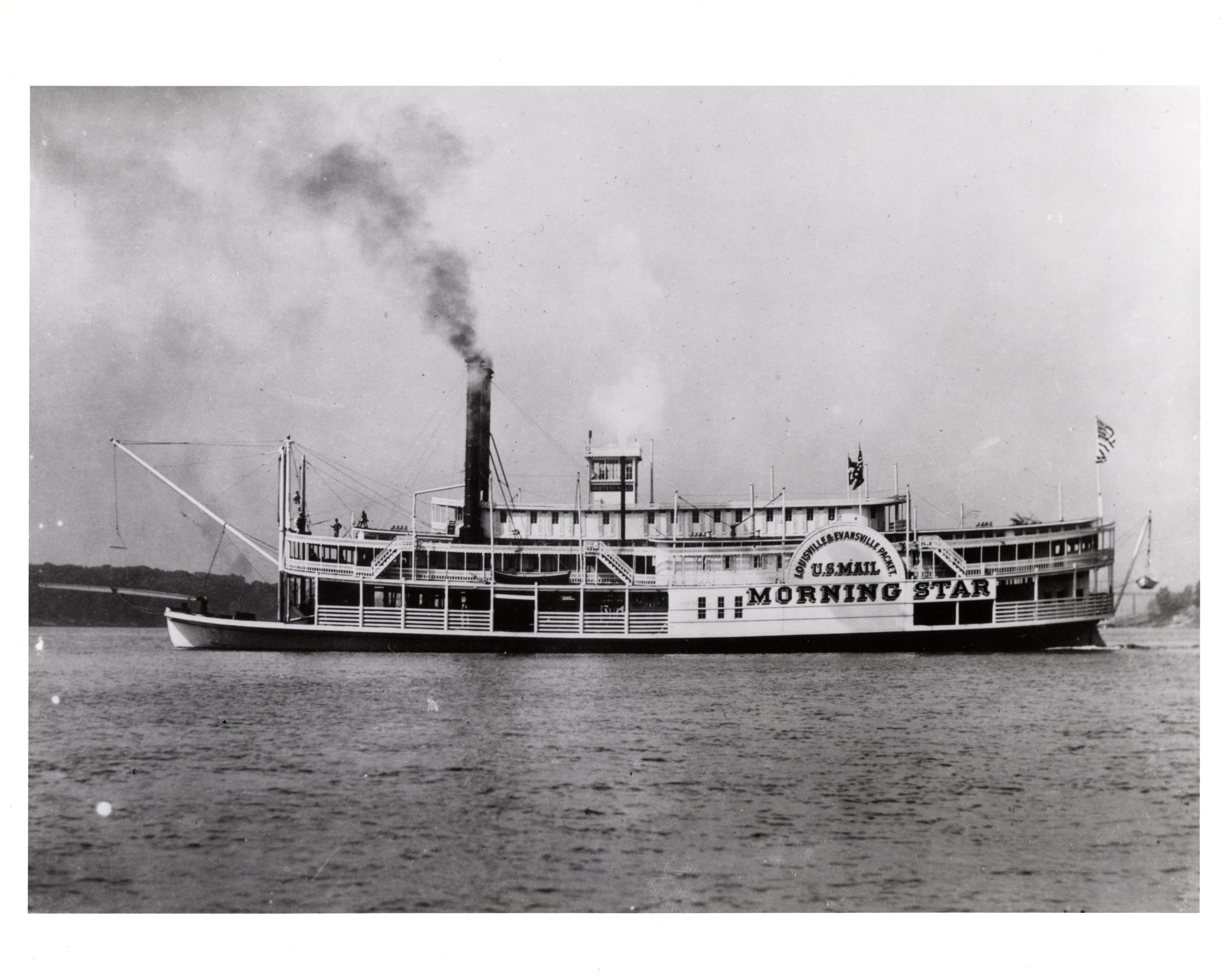
Steamboat Morning Star, a Louisville and Evansville mail packet, in 1858

The river had great significance in the history of the Native Americans, as numerous prehistoric and historic civilizations formed along its valley. For thousands of years, Native Americans used the river as a major transportation and trading route.

In the five centuries before European colonization, the Mississippian culture built numerous regional chiefdoms and major earthwork mounds in the Ohio Valley like the Angel Mounds near Evansville, Indiana as well as in the Mississippi Valley and the Southeast. The historic Osage, Omaha, Ponca, and Kaw peoples lived in the Ohio Valley. Under pressure over the fur trade from the Haudenosaunee nations to the northeast, they migrated west of the Mississippi River in the 17th century to the territory now defined as Missouri, Arkansas, and Oklahoma.

=== European arrival ===
Several accounts exist of the discovery and traversal of the Ohio River by Europeans in the latter half of the 17th century: Virginian colonist Abraham Wood's trans-Appalachian expeditions between 1654 and 1664; Frenchman Robert de La Salle's putative Ohio expedition of 1669; and two expeditions of Virginians sponsored by Colonel Wood: the Batts and Fallam expedition of 1671, and the Needham and Arthur expedition of 1673–74.

=== Exploration and settlement ===
==== Arnout Viele (1693) ====
In early autumn 1692, loyal English-speaking Dutchman Arnout Viele and a party of eleven companions from Esopus—Europeans, Shawnee, and a few loyal Delaware guides—were sent by the governor of New York to trade with the Shawnee and bring them into the English sphere of influence. Viele understood several Native American languages, which made him valuable as an interpreter. He is credited with being the first European to travel and explore western Pennsylvania and the upper Ohio Valley. Viele made contact with Native American nations as far west as the Wabash River, in present-day Indiana.

He and his company left Albany, traveling southbound and crossing portions of present-day New Jersey and eastern Pennsylvania. They apparently followed the west branch of the Susquehanna River into the mountains, traversing the Tioga River and reaching a tributary of the Allegheny River before floating down to the Shawnee towns along the Ohio River. Viele and his expedition spent most of 1693 exploring the Ohio River and its tributaries in northern Kentucky with their Shawnee hosts. Gerit Luykasse, two of Viele's Dutch traders, and two Shawnee reappeared in Albany in February 1694 "to fetch powder for Arnout [Viele] and his Company"; their party had been gone for fifteen months, but Viele was away for about two years. He and his companions returned from the Pennsylvania wilderness in August 1694, accompanied by diplomats from "seven Nations of Indians" who sought trade with the English (or peace with the powerful Haudenosaunee nations of New York and Pennsylvania), and hundreds of Shawnee who intended to relocate in the Minisink country on the upper Delaware River.

==== Gaspard-Joseph Chaussegros de Léry (1729) ====
In 1729, Gaspard-Joseph Chaussegros de Léry, a French architect and surveyor whose survey was the first mapping of the Ohio River, led an expedition of French troops from Fort Niagara down the Allegheny and Ohio Rivers as far as the mouth of the Great Miami River near Big Bone Lick and possibly the Falls of the Ohio (present-day Louisville). Chaussegros de Léry mapped the Great Lakes in 1725, and engineered the Niagara fortifications in 1726.

I am indebted for the topographical details of the course of this River to M. de Lery, Engineer, who surveyed it with the compass at the time that he descended it with a detachment of French troops in 1729.

— Jacques-Nicolas Bellin

A map of the Ohio River valley, drawn by Bellin from observations by de Lery, is in Pierre François Xavier de Charlevoix's History of New France. The 1744 Bellin map, "Map of Louisiana" (French: Carte de La Louisiane), has an inscription at a point south of the Ohio River and north of the Falls: "Place where one found the ivory of Elephant in 1729" (French: endroit ou on à trouvé des os d'Elephant en 1729). De Lery's men found teeth weighing ten pounds (4.5 kg) with a diameter of five to seven inches (130 to 180 mm), tusks 11 feet (3.4 m) long and 6–7 inches (150–180 mm) in diameter, and thigh bones 5 feet (1.5 m) long. The bones were collected and shipped to Paris, where they were identified as mastodon remains; they are on display at the French National Natural History Museum.

==== Charles III Le Moyne, Baron de Longueil (1739) ====
Charles III Le Moyne, second Baron de Longueuil (later the governor of Montreal and interim governor of New France), commanded Fort Niagara from 1726 to 1733. He led an expedition of 442 men, including Native Americans, from Montreal to war against the Chickasaw who occupied territory on the lower part of the Mississippi River in the area claimed as La Louisiane. According to Gaston Pierre de Lévis, Duke de Mirepoix, the expedition used the Ohio River as a corridor to the Mississippi.

Among the officers who accompanied this party were Major de Lignery; Lieutenants, de Vassan, Aubert de Gaspe, Du Vivier, de Verrier, Le Gardeur de St. Pierre, Chevalier de Villiers, de Portneuf, de Sabrevious; Father Vernet, chaplain; Cadets, Joncaire de Closonne, Le Gai de Joncaire, Drouet de Richarville the younger, Chaussegros de Lery the younger, de Gannes, Chev. Benoist, de Morville, de Selles, and seventeen others. The rank and file consisted of three sergeants, six corporals, six lance corporals, twenty-four soldiers, forty-five habitants, one hundred and eighty-six Haudenosaunee from the Sault, forty-one from the Lake of Two Mountains, thirty-two Algonquin and Nipissing, fifty Abenaqui from St. Francois and Bécancour, Quebec; Father La Bretonnier, Jesuit; Queret, missionary.

One of the first reported eyewitness accounts of Shannoah, a Shawnee town, was by le Moyne III in July 1739. On their journey down the Ohio River toward the Mississippi, they met with local chiefs in a village on the Scioto River.

==== John Howard and John Peter Salling (1742) ====
John Howard, a pioneer from Virginia, led a party of five—John Peter Salling (a Pennsylvania German), Josiah Howard (John's son), Charles Sinclair, and John Poteet (Vizt)—from the Virginia mountains to the Mississippi River. The elder Howard had a promised reward of 10,000 acres (4,000 ha) of land for a successful expedition from the Virginia Royal Governor's Council to reinforce British claims in the west. Howard offered equal shares of the 10,000 acres to the four other members of his expedition. The party of five left John Peter Salling's house in August County on March 16, 1742, and traveled west to Cedar Creek (near the Natural Bridge), crossing Greenbrier River and landing at the New River. At New River, the Virginia explorers built a large bull boat frame and covered it with five buffalo skins. The first Englishmen to explore the region then followed the New River for 250 miles (400 km), until it became too dangerous to navigate. At a large waterfall, they traveled overland to the Coal River. Following the Kanawha River, they entered the Ohio River 444 miles (715 km) above the falls. The Virginia pioneers traced the northern boundary of Kentucky for five hundred miles (800 km), reaching the Mississippi River on June 7. They descended just below the mouth of the Arkansas River, where they were ambushed by a large company of Native Americans, Blacks and Frenchmen on July 2, 1742; one or two of Howard's men were killed. The rest were brought to New Orleans and imprisoned as spies. After two years in prison, Salling escaped on October 25, 1744, and returned on a southern route to his home in Augusta County, Virginia, in May 1745. John Howard was extradited to France to stand trial. His ship was intercepted by the English and, as a free man, he reported his adventures after landing in London; however, his account has been lost. Salling's detailed account of Virginia's adjacent lands was used in Joshua Fry and Peter Jefferson's 1751 map.

In 1749, the Ohio Company was established in Virginia Colony to settle and trade in the Ohio River region. Exploration of the territory and trade with the Indians in the region near the Forks brought white colonists from both Pennsylvania and Virginia across the mountains, and both colonies claimed the territory. The movement across the Allegheny Mountains of Anglo-American settlers and the claims of the area near modern-day Pittsburgh led to conflict with the French, who had forts in the Ohio River Valley. This conflict was called the French and Indian War, and would merge into the global Anglo-French struggle, the Seven Years' War. In 1763, following its defeat in the war, France ceded its area east of the Mississippi River to Britain and its area west of the Mississippi River to Spain in the 1763 Treaty of Paris.

The 1768 Treaty of Fort Stanwix with several tribes opened Kentucky to colonial settlement and established the Ohio River as a southern boundary for American Indian territory. In 1774 the Quebec Act restored the land east of the Mississippi River and north of the Ohio River to Quebec, in effect making the Ohio the southern boundary of Canada. This appeased French Canadians in Quebec but angered the colonists of the Thirteen Colonies. Lord Dunmore's War south of the Ohio river also contributed to cession of land north to Quebec to prevent colonial expansion onto Native American territory. In 1776, during the Revolutionary War, the British military engineer John Montrésor created a map of the river showing the strategic location of Fort Pitt, including specific navigational information about the Ohio River's rapids and tributaries in that area. The 1783 Treaty of Paris gave the entire Ohio Valley to the United States, and numerous white settlers entered the region.

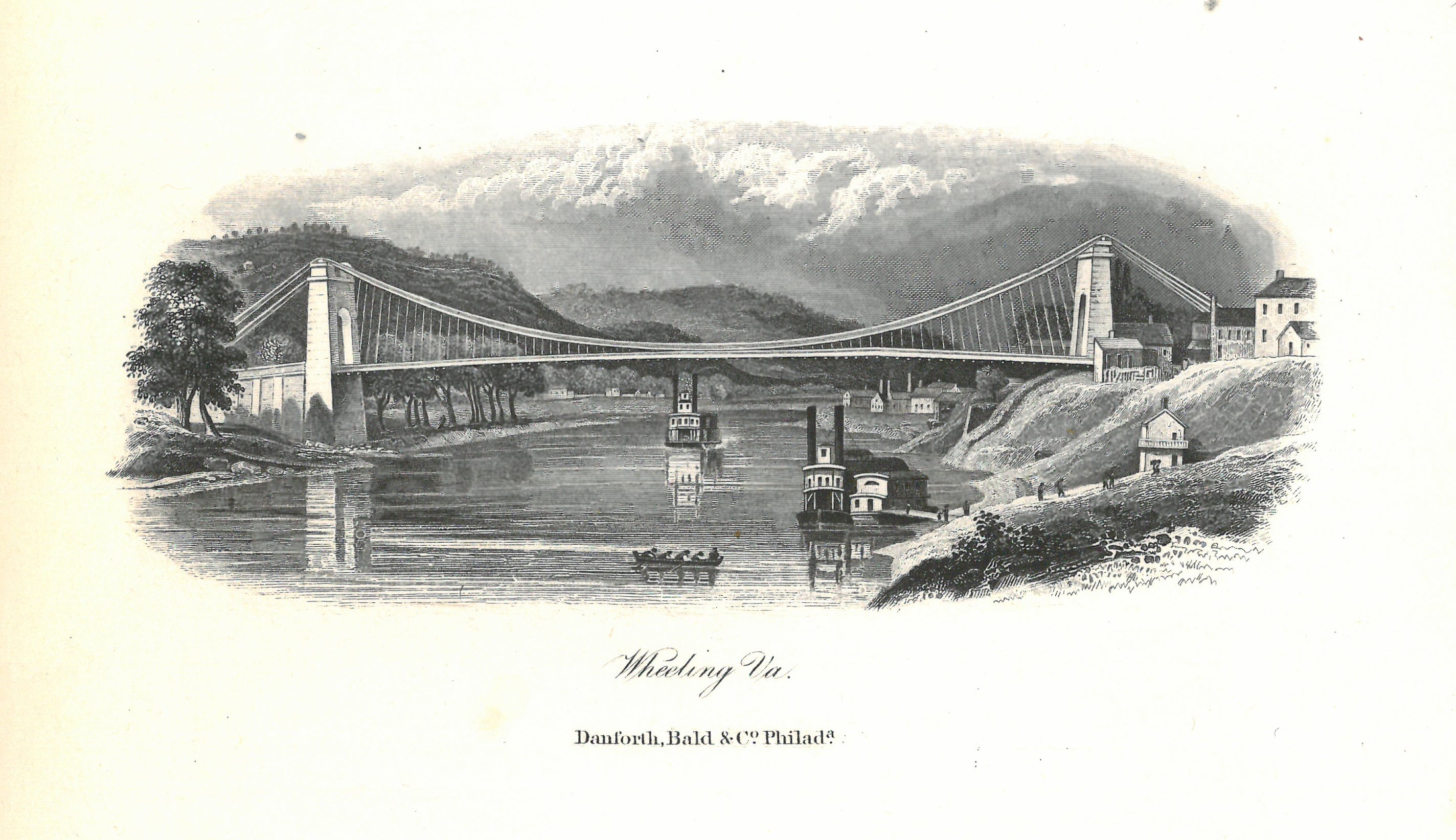
Built between 1847 and 1849, the Wheeling Suspension Bridge was the first bridge across the river and a crucial part of the National Road.

The economic connection of the Ohio Country to the East was significantly increased in 1818 when the National Road being built westward from Cumberland, Maryland, reached Wheeling, Virginia, (now West Virginia), providing an easier overland connection from the Potomac River to the Ohio River. The Wheeling Suspension Bridge was built over the river at Wheeling from 1847 to 1849, making the trip west easier, and was the world's largest suspension bridge until 1851. The bridge survived the American Civil War, after having been improved in 1859. It was renovated again in 1872, and remains in use as the oldest vehicular suspension bridge in the U.S.

Louisville was founded in 1778 as a military encampment on Corn Island (now submerged) by General George Rogers Clark at the only major natural navigational barrier on the river, the Falls of the Ohio. The Falls were a series of rapids where the river dropped 26 feet (7.9 m) in a stretch of about 2 miles (3.2 km). In this area, the river flowed over hard, fossil-rich beds of limestone. The outpost was moved that same year to the south shore where Fort-on-Shore was constructed. It proved insufficient within three years, and Fort Nelson was constructed upriver. The town of Louisville was chartered in 1780, in honor of King Louis XVI of France. The first locks on the river – the Louisville and Portland Canal – were built between 1825 and 1830 to circumnavigate the falls. Fears that Louisville's transshipment industry would collapse proved ill-founded: but the increasing size of steamships and barges on the river meant that the outdated locks could serve only the smallest vessels until well after the Civil War when improvements were made. The U.S. Army Corps of Engineers improvements were expanded again in the 1960s, forming the present-day McAlpine Locks and Dam.

=== 19th century ===
During the nineteenth century, emigrants from Virginia, North Carolina and Kentucky traveled by the river and settled along its northern bank. Known as butternuts, they formed the dominant culture in the southern portions of Ohio, Indiana and Illinois with a society that was primarily Southern in culture. Largely devoted to agricultural pursuits, they shipped much of their produce along the river to ports such as Cincinnati.

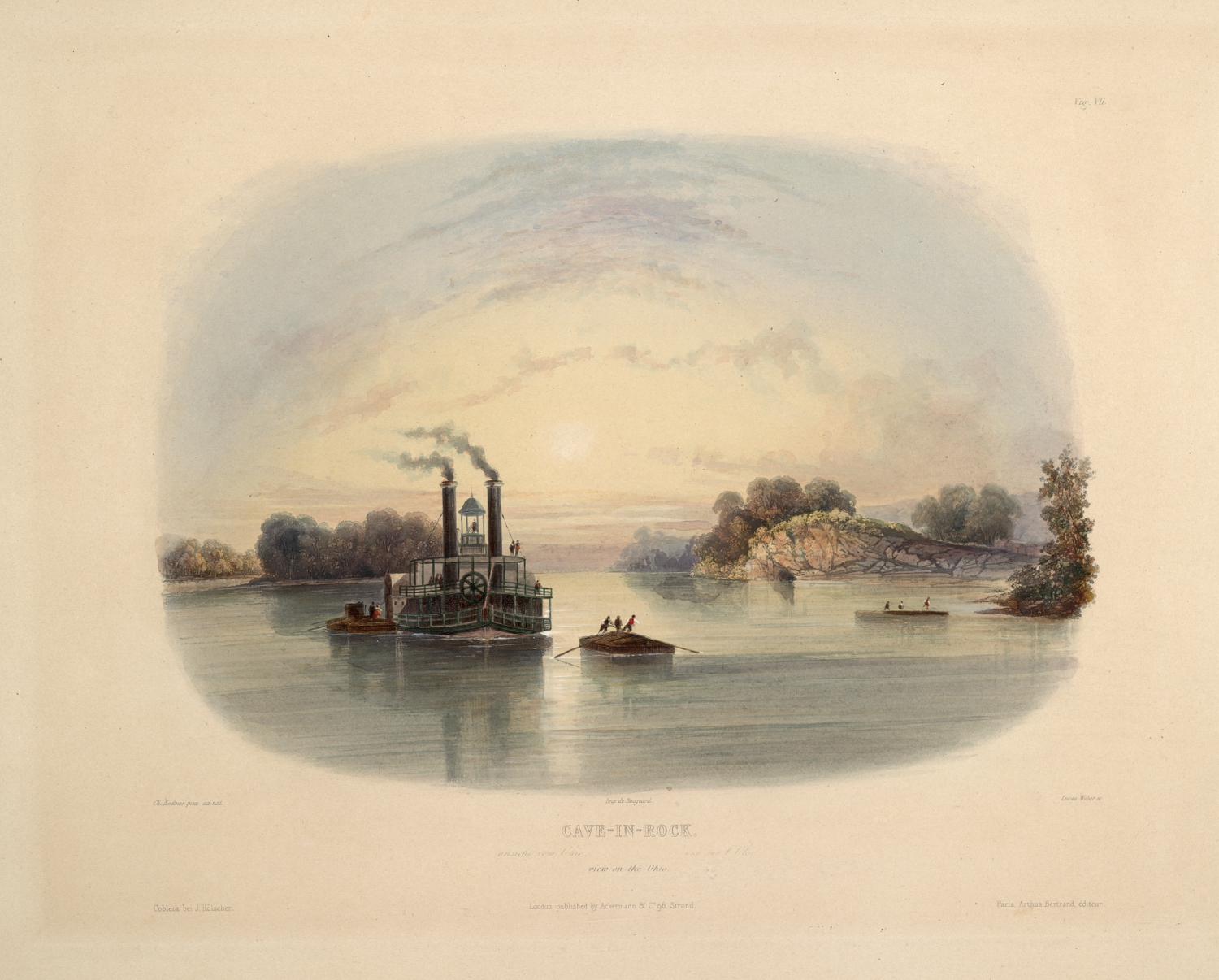
Cave-in-rock, view on the Ohio (circa 1832, Cave-In-Rock, Illinois): aquatint by Karl Bodmer from the book Maximilian, Prince of Wied's Travels in the Interior of North America, during the years 1832–1834

Because the Ohio River flowed westward, it became a convenient means of westward movement by pioneers traveling from western Pennsylvania. After reaching the mouth of the Ohio, settlers would travel north on the Mississippi River to St. Louis, Missouri. There, some continued on up the Missouri River, some up the Mississippi, and some farther west over land routes. In the early 19th century, river pirates such as Samuel Mason, operating out of Cave-In-Rock, Illinois, waylaid travelers on their way down the river. They killed travelers, stealing their goods and scuttling their boats. The folktales about Mike Fink recall the keelboats used for commerce in the early days of American settlement. The Ohio River boatmen inspired performer Dan Emmett, who in 1843 wrote the song "The Boatman's Dance".

Trading boats and ships traveled south on the Mississippi to New Orleans, and sometimes beyond to the Gulf of Mexico and other ports in the Americas and Europe. This provided a much-needed export route for goods from the west since the trek east over the Appalachian Mountains was long and arduous. The need for access to the port of New Orleans by settlers in the Ohio Valley is one of the factors that led to the United States' Louisiana Purchase in 1803.

Because the river is the southern border of Ohio, Indiana, and Illinois, it was part of the border between free states and slave states in the years before the American Civil War. One antebellum slave trader reported that they kept slaves chained two-by-two while navigating the Ohio, only when they reached the Mississippi could the slaves be unchained for a time, because "there was slavery on both sides of the boat". The expression "sold down the river" originated as a lament of Upper South slaves, especially from Kentucky, who were shipped via the Ohio and Mississippi to cotton and sugar plantations in the Deep South. Changes in crops cultivated in the Upper South resulted in slaves available to be sold to the South, where the expansion of cotton plantations was doing very well. Invention of the cotton gin made cultivation of short-staple cotton profitable throughout the Black Belt of this region.

Before and during the Civil War, the Ohio River was called the "River Jordan" by slaves crossing it to escape to freedom in the North via the Underground Railroad. More escaping slaves, estimated in the thousands, made their perilous journey north to freedom across the Ohio River than anywhere else across the north–south frontier. Harriet Beecher Stowe's Uncle Tom's Cabin, the bestselling novel that fueled abolitionist work, was the best known of the anti-slavery novels that portrayed such escapes across the Ohio. The times have been expressed by 20th-century novelists as well, such as the Nobel Prize-winning Toni Morrison, whose novel Beloved was adapted as a film of the same name. She also composed the libretto for the opera Margaret Garner (2005), based on the life and trial of an enslaved woman who escaped with her family across the river.

=== 20th century ===
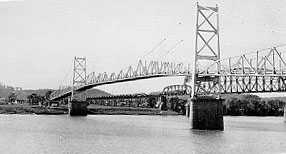
Silver Bridge in Point Pleasant, West Virginia, which collapsed into the Ohio River on December 15, 1967, killing 46 people

The Silver Bridge at Point Pleasant, West Virginia, collapsed into the river on December 15, 1967. The collapse killed 46 people who had been crossing when the bridge failed. The bridge had been built in 1929, and by 1967 was carrying too heavy a load for its design. The bridge was rebuilt about one mile downstream and in service as the Silver Memorial Bridge in 1969. In the early 1980s, the Falls of the Ohio National Wildlife Conservation Area was established at Clarksville, Indiana.

=== Border disputes ===
The colonial charter for Virginia defined its territory as extending to the north shore of the Ohio, so that the riverbed was "owned" by Virginia. Where the river serves as a boundary between states today, Congress designated the entire river to belong to the states on the east and south, i.e., West Virginia and Kentucky at the time of admission to the Union, that were divided from Virginia. Thus Wheeling Island, the largest inhabited island in the Ohio River, belongs to West Virginia, although it is closer to the Ohio shore than to the West Virginia shore. Kentucky sued the state of Indiana in the early 1980s because of their construction of the never-completed Marble Hill Nuclear Power Plant in Indiana, which would have discharged its waste water into the river. This would have adversely affected Kentucky's water supplies.

The U.S. Supreme Court held that Kentucky's jurisdiction (and, implicitly, that of West Virginia) extended only to the low-water mark of 1793 (important because the river has been extensively dammed for navigation so that the present river bank is north of the old low-water mark). Similarly, in the 1990s, Kentucky challenged Illinois's right to collect taxes on a riverboat casino docked in Metropolis, citing its own control of the entire river. A private casino riverboat that docked in Evansville, Indiana, on the Ohio River opened about the same time. Although such boats cruised on the Ohio River in an oval pattern up and down, the state of Kentucky soon protested. Other states had to limit their cruises to going forward, then reversing and going backward on the Indiana shore only. Both Illinois and Indiana have long since changed their laws to allow riverboat casinos to be permanently docked, with Illinois changing in 1999 and Indiana in 2002.

== Course and watershed ==
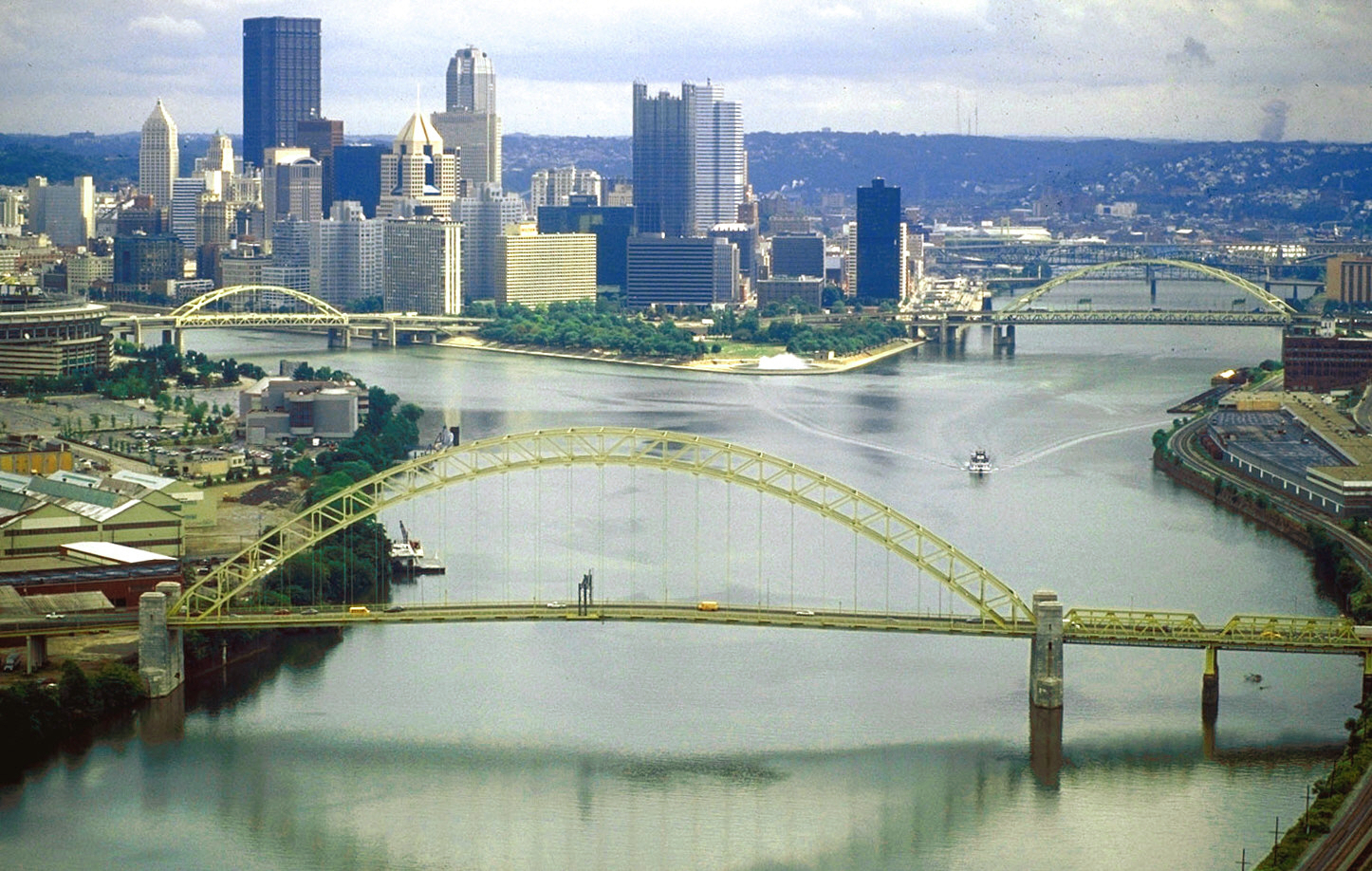
The Allegheny River, left, and Monongahela River join to form the Ohio River at Pittsburgh, Pennsylvania, the largest metropolitan area on the river.

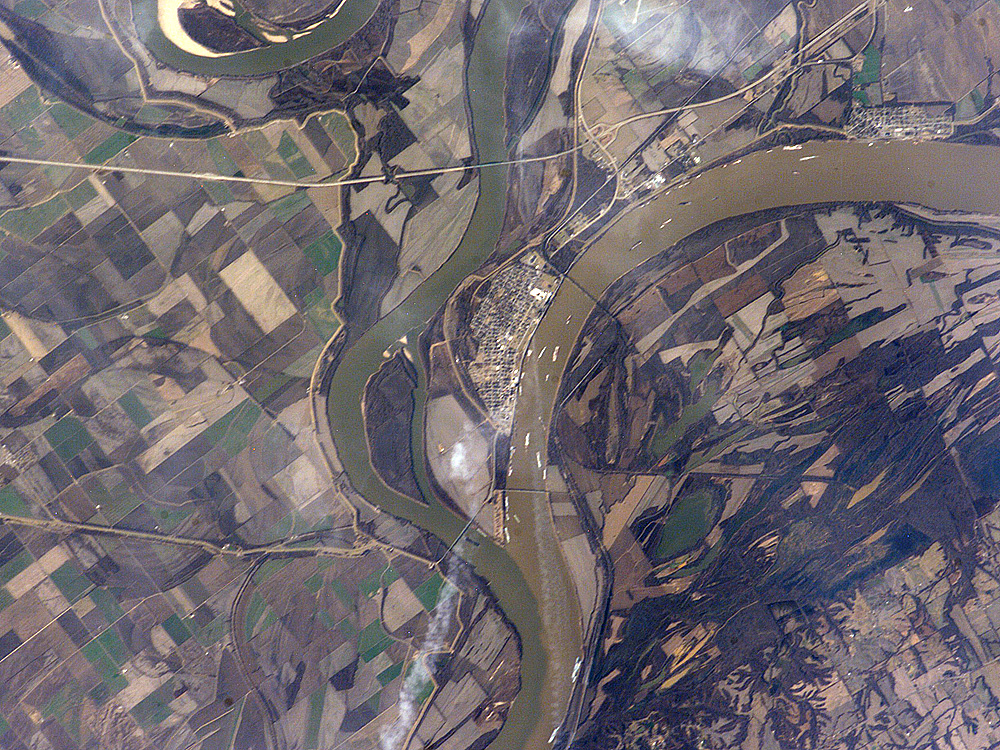
The confluence of the Mississippi and Ohio rivers is at Cairo, Illinois.

The combined Allegheny-Ohio river is 1,310 miles (2,110 km) long and carries the largest volume of water of any tributary of the Mississippi. The Indians and early European explorers and settlers of the region often considered the Allegheny to be part of the Ohio. The forks (the confluence of the Allegheny and Monongahela rivers at what is now Pittsburgh) were considered a strategic military location by colonial French and British, and later independent American military authorities.

The Ohio River is formed by the confluence of the Allegheny and Monongahela rivers at what is now Point State Park in Pittsburgh, Pennsylvania. From there, it flows northwest through Allegheny and Beaver counties, before making an abrupt turn to the south-southwest at the West Virginia–Ohio–Pennsylvania triple-state line (near East Liverpool, Ohio; Chester, West Virginia; and Ohioville, Pennsylvania). From there, it forms the border between West Virginia and Ohio, upstream of Wheeling, West Virginia.

The river follows a roughly southwest and then west-northwest course until Cincinnati, before bending to a west-southwest course for most of the remainder of its length. The course forms the northern borders of West Virginia and Kentucky; and the southern borders of Ohio, Indiana and Illinois, until it joins the Mississippi River at the city of Cairo, Illinois. Where the Ohio joins the Mississippi is the lowest elevation in the state of Illinois, at 315 feet (96 m).

The Mississippi River flows to the Gulf of Mexico on the Atlantic Ocean. Among rivers wholly or mostly in the United States, the Ohio is the second largest by discharge volume and the tenth longest and has the eighth largest drainage basin. It serves to separate the Midwestern Great Lakes states from the Upper South states, which were historically border states in the Civil War.

The Ohio River is a left (east) and the largest tributary by volume of the Mississippi River in the United States. At the confluence, the Ohio is considerably bigger than the Mississippi, measured by long-term mean discharge. The Ohio River at Cairo is 281,500 cu ft/s (7,960 m^{3}/s); and the Mississippi River at Thebes, Illinois, which is upstream of the confluence, is 208,200 cu ft/s (5,897 m^{3}/s). The Ohio River flow is greater than that of the Mississippi River, so hydrologically the Ohio River is the main stream of the river system.

=== River depth ===
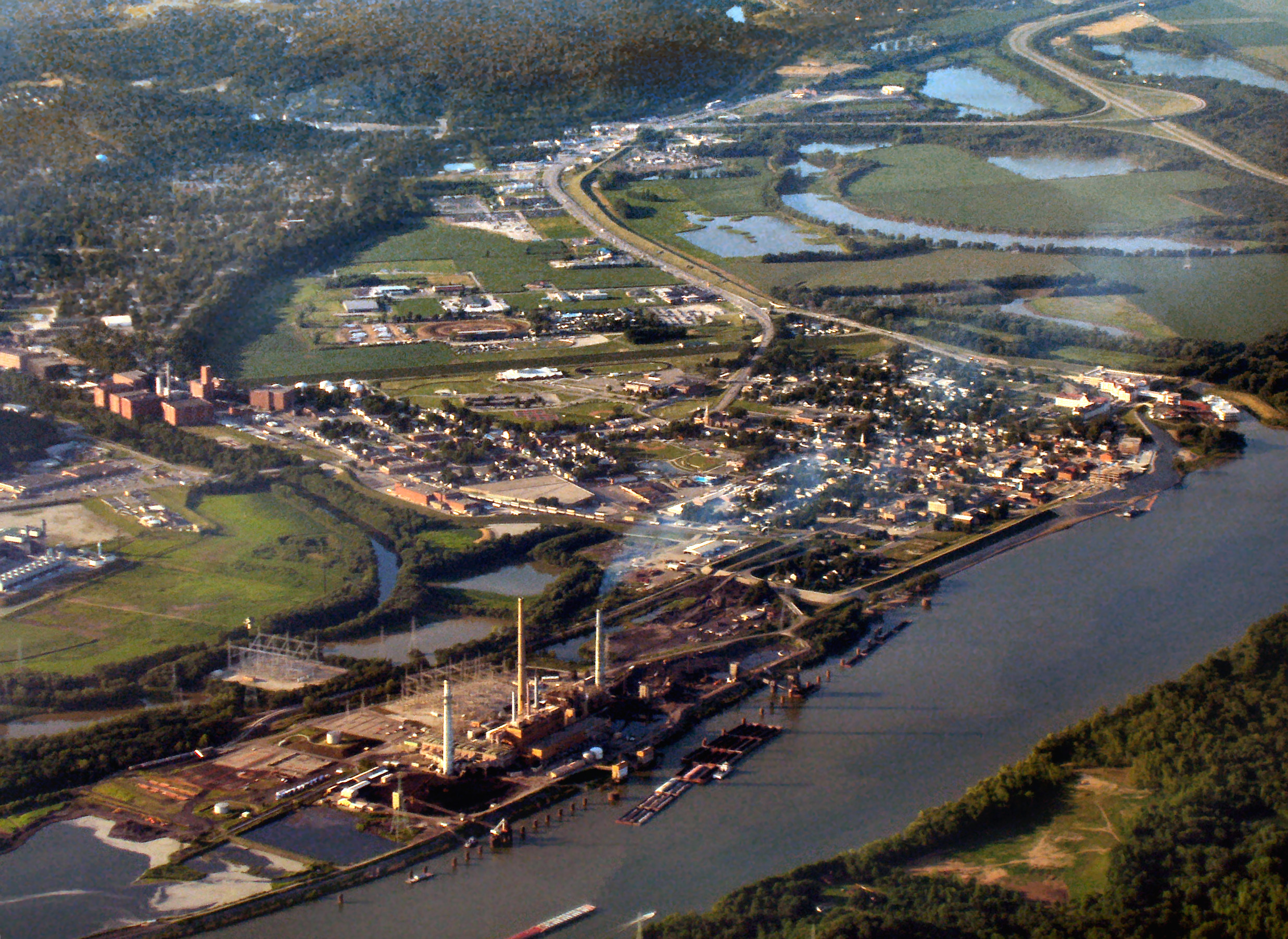
Lawrenceburg, Indiana, is one of many towns that use the Ohio as a shipping avenue.

The Ohio River is a naturally shallow river that was artificially deepened by a series of dams. The natural depth of the river varied from about 3 to 20 feet (1 to 6 m). The dams raise the water level and have turned the river largely into a series of reservoirs, eliminating shallow stretches and allowing for commercial navigation. From its origin to Cincinnati, the average depth is approximately 15 feet (5 m). The largest immediate drop in water level is below the McAlpine Locks and Dam at the Falls of the Ohio at Louisville, Kentucky, where flood stage is reached when the water reaches 23 feet (7 m) on the lower gauge. However, the river's deepest point is 168 feet (51 m) on the western side of Louisville, Kentucky. From Louisville, the river loses depth very gradually until its confluence with the Mississippi at Cairo, Illinois, where it has an approximate depth of 19 feet (6 m).

Water levels for the Ohio River from Smithland Lock and Dam upstream to Pittsburgh are predicted daily by the National Oceanic and Atmospheric Administration's Ohio River Forecast Center. The water depth predictions are relative to each local flood plain based upon predicted rainfall in the Ohio River basin in five reports as follows:

- Pittsburgh, Pennsylvania, to Hannibal Locks and Dam, Ohio (including the Allegheny and Monongahela rivers)
- Willow Island Locks and Dam, Ohio, to Greenup Lock and Dam, Kentucky (including the Kanawha River)
- Portsmouth, Ohio, to Markland Locks and Dam, Kentucky
- McAlpine Locks and Dam, Kentucky, to Cannelton Locks and Dam, Indiana
- Newburgh Lock and Dam, Indiana, to Golconda, Illinois

The water levels for the Ohio River from Smithland Lock and Dam to Cairo, Illinois, are predicted by the National Oceanic and Atmospheric Administration's Lower Mississippi River Forecast Center.

- Smithland Lock and Dam, Illinois, to Cairo, Illinois

=== List of major tributaries ===
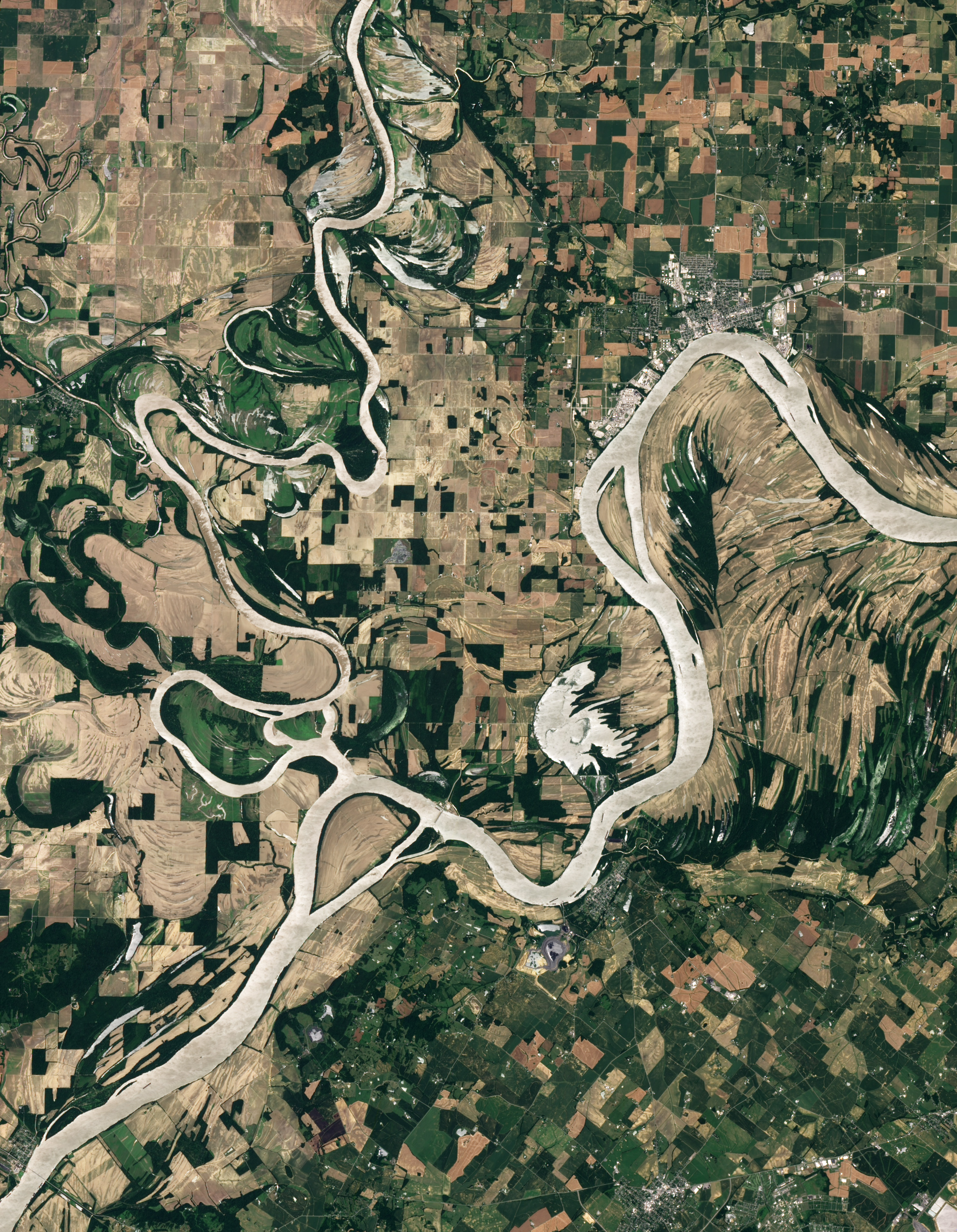
Natural-color satellite image of the Wabash-Ohio confluence

The largest tributaries of the Ohio by discharge volume are:

- Tennessee River 70,575 cu ft/s (1,998.5 m^{3}/s)
- Cumberland River 37,250 cu ft/s (1,055 m^{3}/s)
- Wabash River 35,350 cu ft/s (1,001 m^{3}/s)
- Allegheny River 19,750 cu ft/s (559 m^{3}/s)
- Kanawha River 15,240 cu ft/s (432 m^{3}/s)
- Green River 14,574 cu ft/s (412.7 m^{3}/s)
- Monongahela River 12,650 cu ft/s (358 m^{3}/s)
- Kentucky River 10,064 cu ft/s (285.0 m^{3}/s)
- Muskingum River 8,973 cu ft/s (254.1 m^{3}/s)
- Scioto River 6,674 cu ft/s (189.0 m^{3}/s)

By drainage basin area, the largest tributaries are:

- Tennessee River 40,910 mi^{2} (106,000 km^{2})
- Wabash River 33,100 mi^{2} (86,000 km^{2})
- Cumberland River 17,920 mi^{2} (46,400 km^{2})
- Kanawha River 12,200 mi^{2} (32,000 km^{2})
- Allegheny River 11,700 mi^{2} (30,000 km^{2})
- Green River 9,230 mi^{2} (23,900 km^{2})
- Muskingum River 8,040 mi^{2} (20,800 km^{2})
- Monongahela River 7,400 mi^{2} (19,000 km^{2})
- Kentucky River 6,970 mi^{2} (18,100 km^{2})
- Scioto River 6,510 mi^{2} (16,900 km^{2})

The largest tributaries by length are:

- Cumberland River 693 mi (1,115 km)
- Tennessee River 652 mi (1,049 km)
- Wabash River 474 mi (763 km)
- Green River 370 mi (600 km)
- Allegheny River 325 mi (523 km)
- Licking River 320 mi (510 km)
- Kentucky River 255 mi (410 km)
- Scioto River 237 mi (381 km)
- Great Miami River 161 mi (259 km)
- Little Kanawha River 160 mi (260 km)

Major tributaries, in order from the headwaters, include:

- Allegheny River – Pittsburgh, Pennsylvania
- Monongahela River – Pittsburgh
- Beaver River – Rochester, Pennsylvania
- Little Muskingum River – Ohio
- Muskingum River – Marietta, Ohio
- Little Kanawha River – Parkersburg, West Virginia
- Hocking River – Hockingport, Ohio
- Kanawha River – Point Pleasant, West Virginia
- Guyandotte River – Huntington, West Virginia
- Big Sandy River – Kentucky-West Virginia border
- Little Sandy River – Greenup, Kentucky
- Little Scioto River – Sciotoville, Ohio
- Scioto River – Portsmouth, Ohio
- Little Miami River – Cincinnati, Ohio
- Licking River – Newport-Covington, Kentucky
- Great Miami River – Ohio-Indiana border
- Kentucky River – Carrollton, Kentucky
- Salt River – West Point, Kentucky
- Green River – near Henderson, Kentucky
- Wabash River – Indiana-Illinois-Kentucky border
- Saline River – Illinois
- Cumberland River – Smithland, Kentucky
- Tennessee River – Paducah, Kentucky
- Cache River – Illinois

=== Drainage basin ===
The Ohio's drainage basin covers 203,940 mi^{2} (528,200 km^{2}), encompassing the easternmost regions of the Mississippi Basin. The Ohio drains parts of 14 states in four regions.

- Northeast
  - New York: a small area of the southern border along the headwaters of the Allegheny.
  - Pennsylvania: a corridor from the southwestern corner to the north-central border.
- Mid-Atlantic/Upper South
  - Maryland: a small corridor along the Youghiogheny River on the western border.
  - West Virginia: all but the Eastern Panhandle.
  - Kentucky: all but a small part in the extreme west drained directly by the Mississippi.
  - Tennessee: all but a small part in the extreme west drained directly by the Mississippi, and a very small area in the southeastern corner which is drained by the Conasauga River.
  - Virginia: most of southwest Virginia.
  - North Carolina: the western quarter.
- Midwest
  - Ohio: 80% (all except a northern strip bordering Lake Erie, and the northwest corner)
  - Indiana: all but the northern area.
  - Illinois: the southeast quarter.
- Deep South
  - Georgia: the far northwest corner.
  - Alabama: the northern portion.
  - Mississippi: the northeast corner.

=== Climate transition zone ===
The Ohio River is a climatic transition area, as its water runs along the periphery of the humid continental and humid subtropical climate areas. It is inhabited by fauna and flora of both climates. In winter, it regularly freezes over at Pittsburgh but rarely farther south toward Cincinnati and Louisville. At Paducah, Kentucky, in the south, at the Ohio's confluence with the Tennessee River, it is ice-free year-round.

In the 21st century, with the 2016 update of climate zones, the humid subtropical zone has stretched across the river, into the southern portions of Ohio, Indiana, and Illinois.

== Geology ==
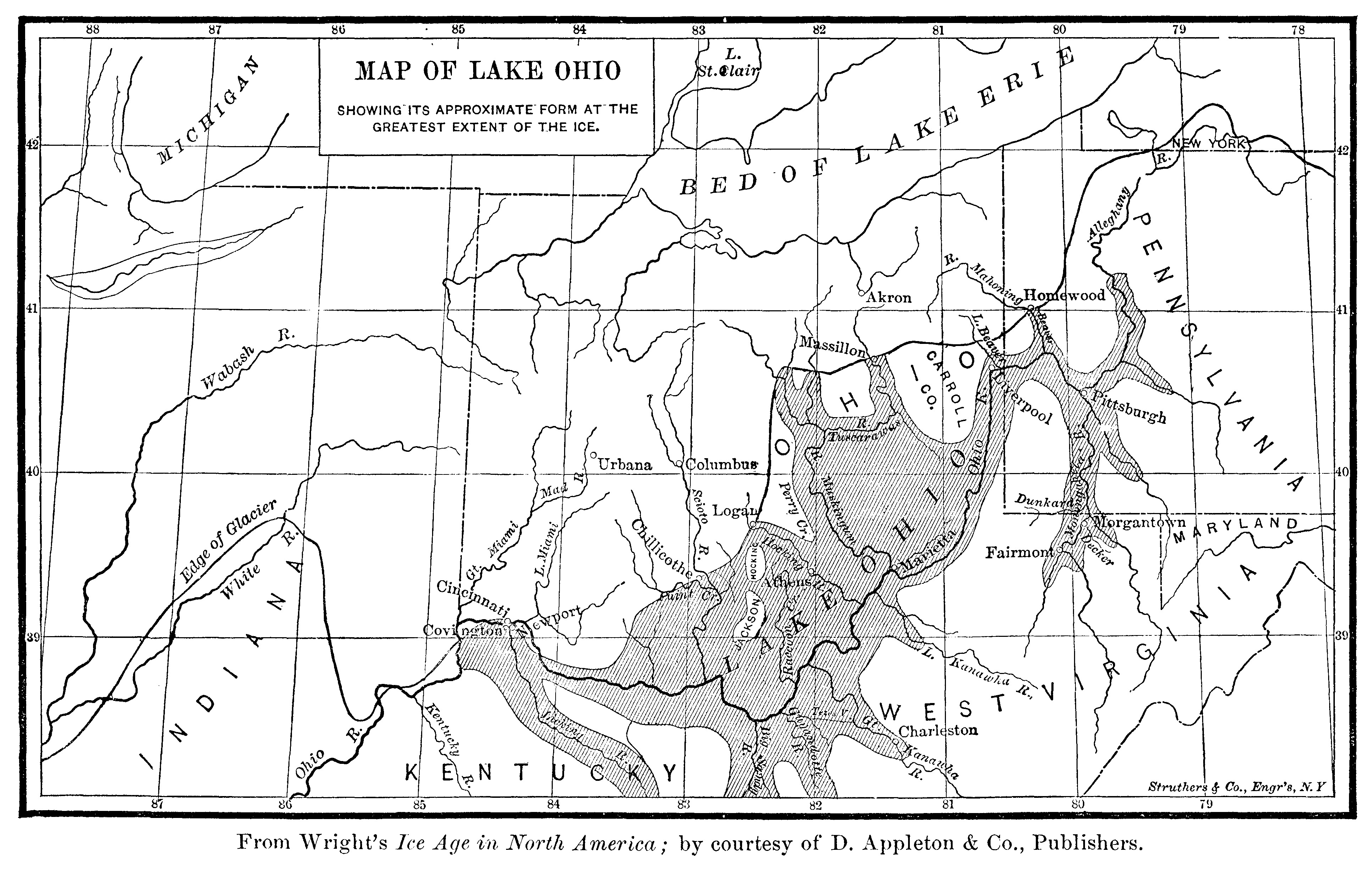
Glacial Lake Ohio

From a geological standpoint, the Ohio River is young. Before the river was created, large parts of North America were covered by water forming a saltwater lake about 200 miles across and 400 miles in length. The bedrock of the Ohio Valley was mostly set during this time. The river formed on a piecemeal basis beginning between 2.5 and 3 million years ago. By the movement of glaciers during the earliest ice ages, the contemporary river drainages of the Kanawha, Sandy, Kentucky, Green, Cumberland and Tennessee rivers northward created the Ohio system and the course of early tributaries of the Ohio River, including the Monongahela and the Allegheny rivers, were set. The Teays River was the largest of these rivers. The modern Ohio River flows within segments of the ancient Teays. The ancient rivers were rearranged or consumed.

The section of the river that runs southwest from Pittsburgh to Cairo, Illinois, is around tens of thousands of years old.

=== Upper Ohio River ===
The upper Ohio River formed when one of the glacial lakes overflowed into a south-flowing tributary of the Teays River. Prior to that event, the north-flowing Steubenville River (no longer in existence) ended between New Martinsville and Paden City, West Virginia. The south-flowing Marietta River (no longer in existence) ended between the present-day cities. The overflowing lake carved through the separating hill and connected the rivers. The floodwaters enlarged the small Marietta valley to a size more typical of a large river. The new large river subsequently drained glacial lakes and melting glaciers at the end of the ice ages. The valley grew during and following the ice age. Many small rivers were altered or abandoned after the upper Ohio River formed. Valleys of some abandoned rivers can still be seen on satellite and aerial images of the hills of Ohio and West Virginia between Marietta, Ohio, and Huntington, West Virginia.

=== Middle Ohio River ===
The middle Ohio River formed in a manner similar to that of the upper Ohio River. A north-flowing river was temporarily dammed by natural forces southwest of present-day Louisville, creating a large lake until the dam burst. A new route was carved to the Mississippi. Eventually, the upper and middle sections combined to form what is essentially the modern Ohio River.

== Ecology ==
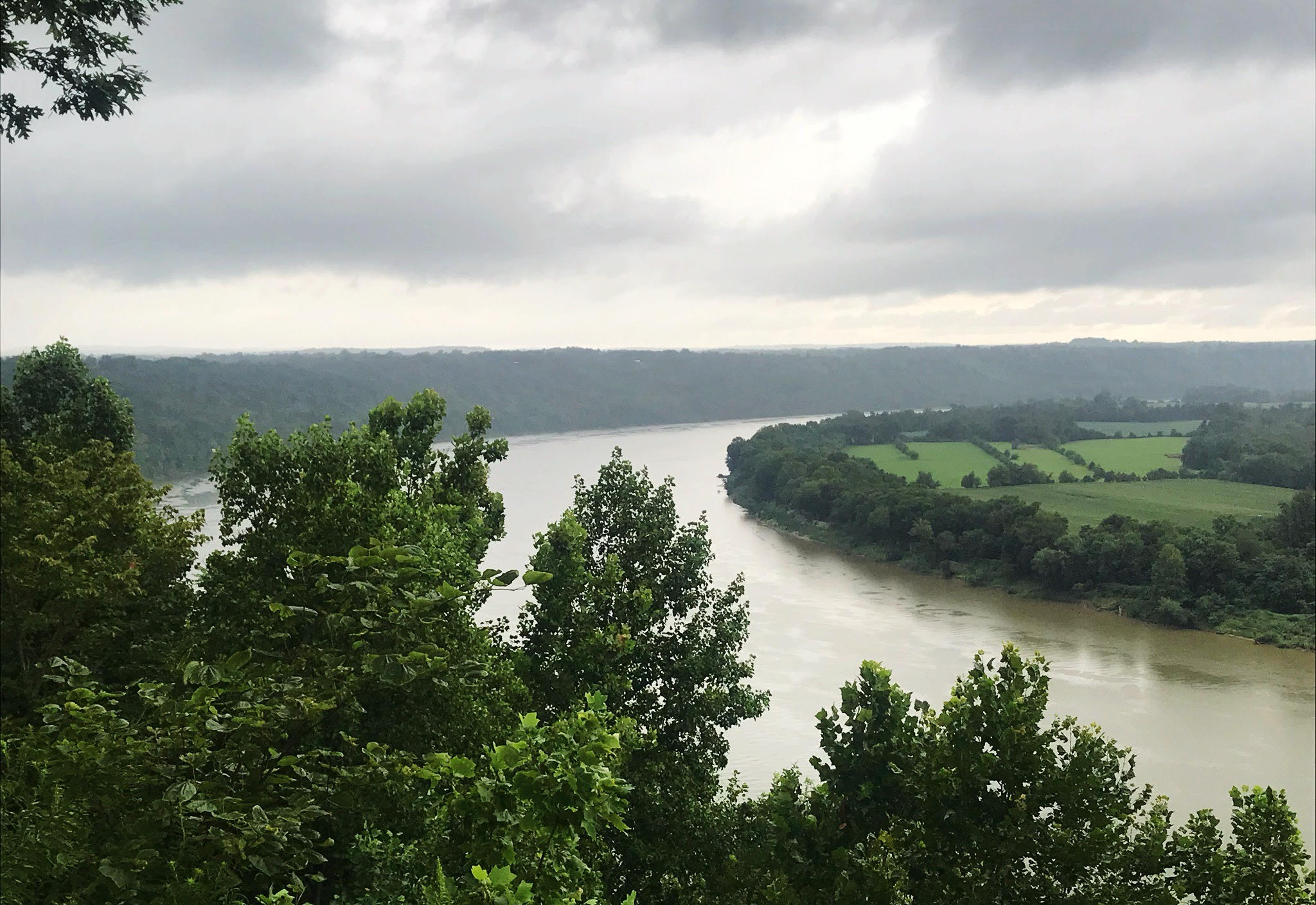
The Ohio River as seen from Fredonia, Indiana

The Ohio River is home to diverse ecosystems and a host of different species. Between 1817 and 1983, there were 154 species of fish found in the river. Only 14 of those species were introduced by humans. Since 1900, there has been an exponential decrease in species of fish that were previously plentiful, like shovelnose sturgeon, paddlefish, muskellunge, and blue sucker. The river also contains over 50 different species of mussels and supports a wide array of birds. Invasive species that have been introduced through anthropogenic means are also present in the river and are in part responsible for this species depletion. For example, zebra mussels and Asian carp both compete with local species for food, causing the decline in some species. Surrounding the Ohio are mixed mesophytic and western mesophytic forests, which are temperate, diverse, and mostly deciduous. Common trees in the Ohio River Basin include oak, hickory, river birch, basswood, poplar, and the yellow buckeye. Many forests along the Ohio in states like Illinois, Indiana, and Kentucky have now been cut down. Some of the plants and animals that live in and around the Ohio River are considered endangered species due to pollution.

A concerning pollutant common in the Ohio River is mercury which accumulates in wildlife, especially fish. Mercury is directly funneled into the river from industrial facilities, like coal-fired power plants and chemical manufacturers. More significant than direct discharge is the release of mercury into the atmosphere from smokestacks, which settles on land and deposits into the water. A six-year study conducted along twelve river locations by Erich B. Emery, a biologist and water quality specialist, and John P. Spaeth, an aquatic scientist, tested mercury bioaccumulation in muscle tissue of hybrid striped bass. Mercury was detected in all samples collected, and tissue concentrations of said mercury ranged from 0.2 to 0.4 mg/kg. Five of the twelve samples (41.6%) had higher concentrations than that considered safe for human consumption by the US Environmental Protection Agency, which suggests consuming only fish with concentrations less than 0.3 mg/kg. The Ohio River Valley Water Sanitation Commission (ORSANCO) identifies seven species of fish, including sauger, black bass, freshwater drum, white bass, striped bass, hybrid striped bass, and flathead catfish, that should not be eaten more than once a month due to high mercury content.

A newer concern in waterways is the presence of per- and polyfluoroalkyl substances, or PFAS, which are also known as "forever chemicals". PFAS are anthropogenic chemicals that are used in manufacturing products and industrial processes. In 2021, 20 different sites along the Ohio River had multiple PFAS compounds at levels that would be concerning to use as drinking water. While the impacts of PFAS on wildlife are still being tested, negative impacts have been seen on the nervous system, reproduction, development, liver, metabolism, and immunity in both human and nonhuman animal health. Reproduction and development are key to the survival of species, which is now being harmed by the amount of PFAS in the Ohio River, especially considering the number of endangered species in and around the river.

=== Pollution ===
The Ohio River has been polluted for decades, and as a whole is ranked as the most polluted river in the United States, based on 2009 and 2010 data. The more industrial and regional West Virginia/Pennsylvania tributary, the Monongahela River, ranked 17th for water pollution, behind 16 other American rivers. The Ohio again ranked as the most polluted in 2013, and has been the most polluted river since at least 2001, according to ORSANCO. The commission found that 92% of toxic discharges were nitrates, including farm runoff and waste water from industrial processes such as steel production. The commission also noted mercury pollution as an ongoing concern, citing a 500% increase in mercury discharges between 2007 and 2013.

The Ohio was originally used as an industrial river, with coal mining, steel mills, and transportation common along its banks in the 20th century. When the Clean Water Act was passed in 1972, those industries were minimally regulated. These historical polluting industries, such as Chemours Chemical, Louisville Gas and Electric, and North American Stainless continue to impact the river, even once their factories leave the banks through legacy pollution. As protections and regulations increased for specific industries along the river, chemical companies began to pollute the river.

For example, Washington Works, a chemical plant owned by Chemours in West Virginia along the Ohio, has been taken to court over releasing high levels of PFAS, or "forever chemicals", into the river. West Virginia Rivers Coalition filed a lawsuit as a citizen's suit under the Clean Water Act against Chemours for violations of their discharge permit and lack of response when the EPA told them to take corrective action. This discharge is occurring in Parkersburg, West Virginia, a small town in Appalachia which has dealt with historical river pollution. For several decades beginning in the 1950s, the Ohio River was polluted with hundreds of thousands of pounds of PFOA, a fluoride-based chemical used in making teflon, among other things, by the DuPont chemical company from an outflow pipe at its Parkersburg facility.

In 2020, heavy industry dumped more toxic pollution into the Ohio River watershed than any other watershed that year. Nearly 41 million pounds of toxic pollution were released into the river by industrial discharges from coal powerplants, steel and aluminum manufacturers, and petrochemical plants, among other businesses. These 41 million pounds accounted for over a fifth of the total industrial pollution released into waterways in the United States in 2020. Most of the chemicals released into all waterways were nitrates which cause lowered dissolved oxygen levels, resulting in toxic algal blooms. In 2019, the Ohio River had algal blooms appear along 265 miles of the river. Heavy metals like arsenic, nickel, and chromium are also dumped in the Ohio river from power plants. Mercury accumulates in the environment and in wildlife, making some fish unsafe for consumption and disturbing food chains.

The Ohio was listed among America's Most Endangered Rivers of 2023 following a high-profile train derailment, and after years as one of the most polluted watersheds in the United States. On February 3, 2023, a Norfolk Southern train carrying hazardous materials derailed in East Palestine, Ohio. The derailment triggered a massive fire, eventually leading to a controlled burn to prevent further damages. Some residents are still concerned about the air and water quality a year after the derailment.

== Economy ==
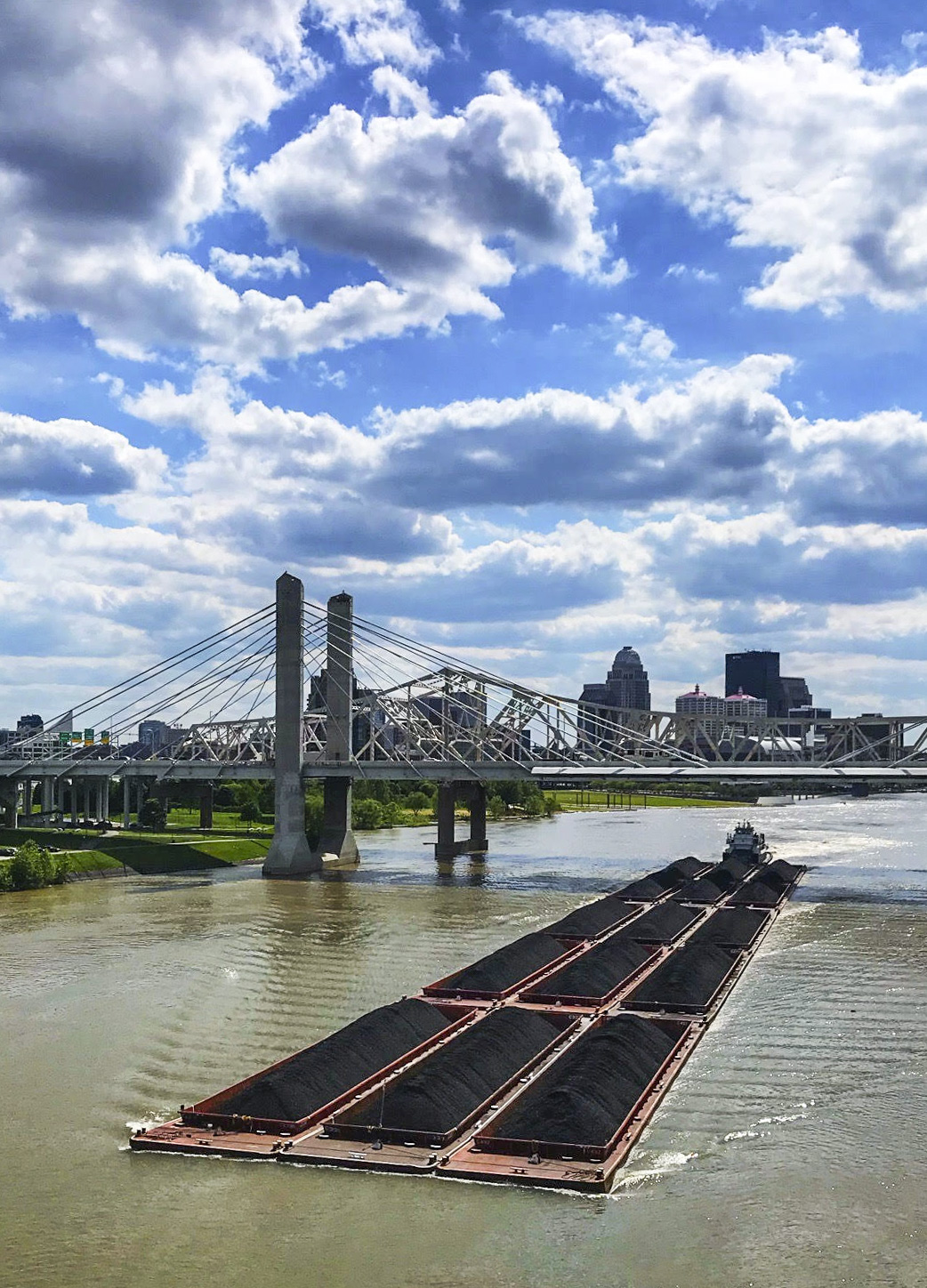
A barge heads east on the Ohio River in Louisville, Kentucky

The Ohio River is extensively industrialized and populated. Regular barge traffic carries cargoes of oil, steel and other industrial goods produced in the region. The Ohio is one of the more important inland waterways of the United States, maintained by the U.S. Army Corps of Engineers as part of its Mississippi River System. Major cities located along the northern and southern banks of the river include Pittsburgh, Pennsylvania; Cincinnati, Ohio; Louisville, Kentucky; and Evansville, Indiana.

While the Ohio River does have major cities and industrial areas, the drainage basin is largely made up of rural, Appalachian landscape that is home to some of the poorest communities in the country. A study done by H. Luke Shaefer at the University of Michigan's Poverty Solutions initiative reports on the intersection between income (using poverty and deep poverty rates), health (using life expectancy and low birth weight), and social mobility to determine the "Index of Deep Disadvantage" in counties and cities across the United States. The report found that the Ohio River valley has some of the most disadvantaged communities in the nation. In particular, nine Ohio Valley counties located in Appalachia are within the top 100 most deeply disadvantaged communities. The life expectancy in one of these counties, McDowell County, West Virginia, is 69 years old, which is almost 10 years younger than the national average.

For example, Parkersburg, West Virginia is located along the Ohio River, and has experienced significant pollution. As of 2025, the average household income in Parkersburg is $62,550 with a poverty rate of 23.01%. The Parkersburg poverty rate is both higher than the West Virginia rate and the United States rate. Parkersburg has experienced historical and contemporary pollution from both Dupont Chemical and Chemours Chemical dumping dangerous byproducts into the Ohio River.

Additionally, East Palestine, Ohio is located within the Ohio River basin about 15 miles (24 km) north of the river, and was the site of the East Palestine, Ohio, train derailment in 2023. As of 2025, the average household income is $66,179 with a poverty rate of 9.52%.

=== Recreation ===
Annual events taking place on or over the river include Thunder Over Louisville, the Madison Regatta, and the Great Steamboat Race.

Multiple West Virginia state record fish were caught along the Ohio River.

=== Environmental justice ===
Environmental justice, as defined by the United States Environmental Protection Agency, is "fair treatment and meaningful involvement of all people regardless of race, color, national origin, or income with respect to development, implementation, and enforcement of environmental laws, regulations, and policies. Fair treatment means that no group of people, including racial, ethnic, or socio-economic groups, should bear a disproportionate share of negative environmental consequences resulting from industrial, municipal, and commercial operations or the execution of federal, state, local, and tribal programs and policies."

Communities along the Ohio River are economically disadvantaged and bear a great burden of environmental degradation. Polluting industries move into the Valley to use the river as a dumping ground. People within surrounding communities then are reliant on polluting industries for jobs and income, not allowing for people to opt out of the pollution of their communities without facing consequences of unemployment. Workers and citizens in these communities also tend to face the negative impacts of pollution through human health issues. Cancer, including rare forms, and other health problems are prevalent in these areas.

Accumulation of mercury in aquatic wildlife raises concerns over if people should be consuming certain fish for fear of adverse health impacts. Mercury has been proven to be especially harmful to young, developing brains. Young people cannot consent to the industrial work that is happening in their towns, and cannot even benefit from potential employment at these places. Even without informed consent, young people are disproportionately impacted by increased mercury levels in fish.

Inefficient agency management and enforcement, especially across states, has proven that agencies know what is happening in the Ohio but have not taken the proper steps to enforce pollution policies. The EPA has recognized that Chemours chemical company has been polluting past what their discharge permit allows, but citizens still have had to take action to attempt to get the river cleaned up.

== Cities and towns along the river ==
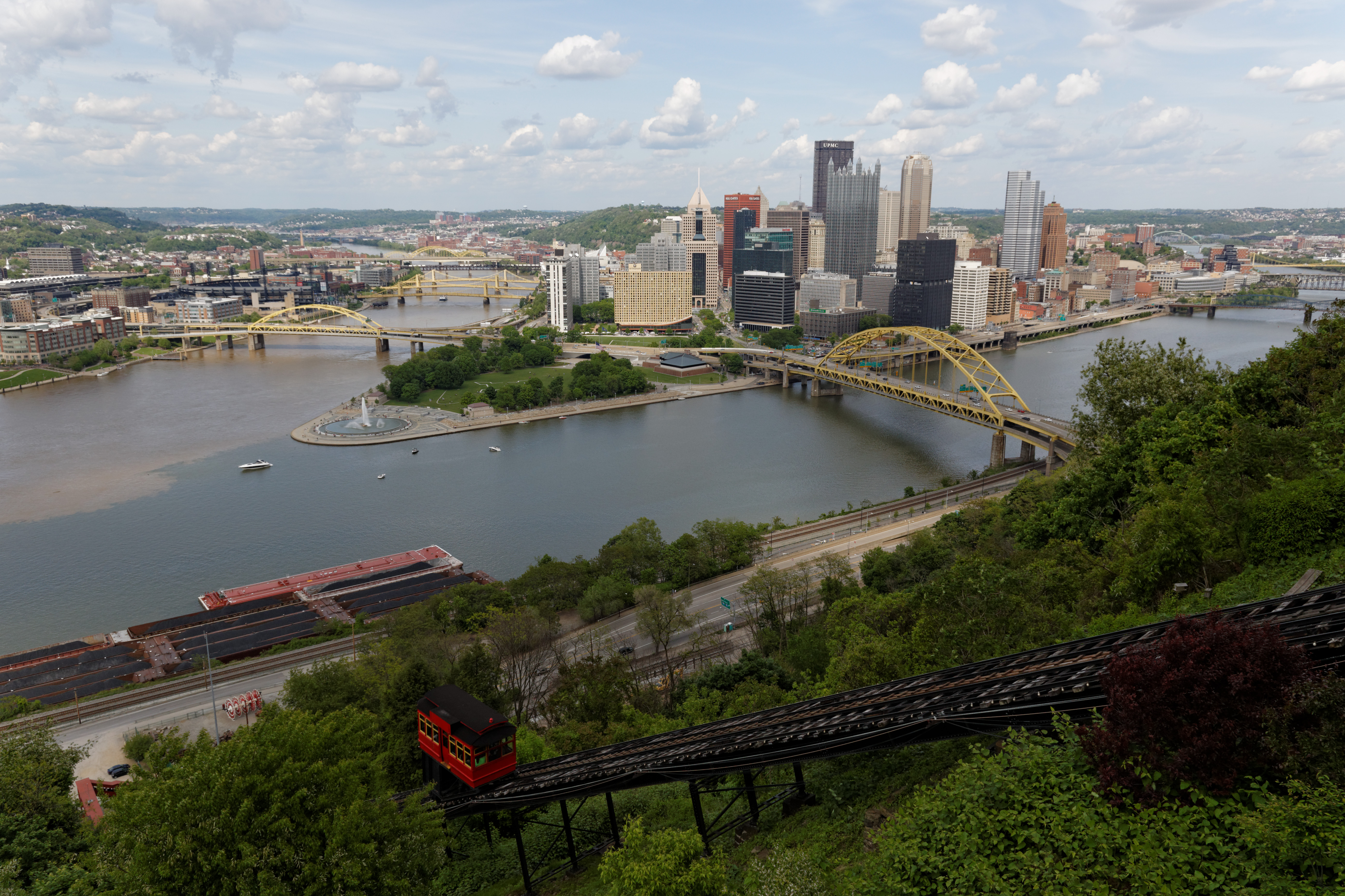
Pittsburgh, Pennsylvania

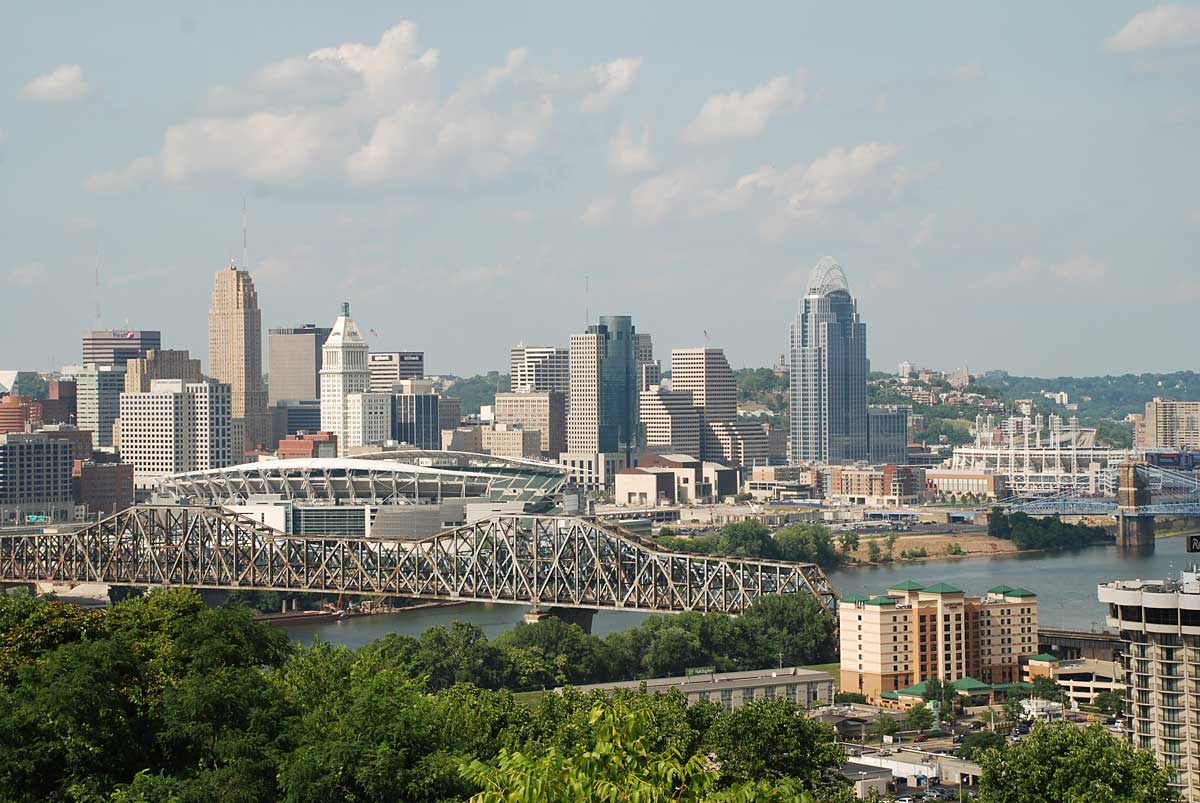
Cincinnati, Ohio

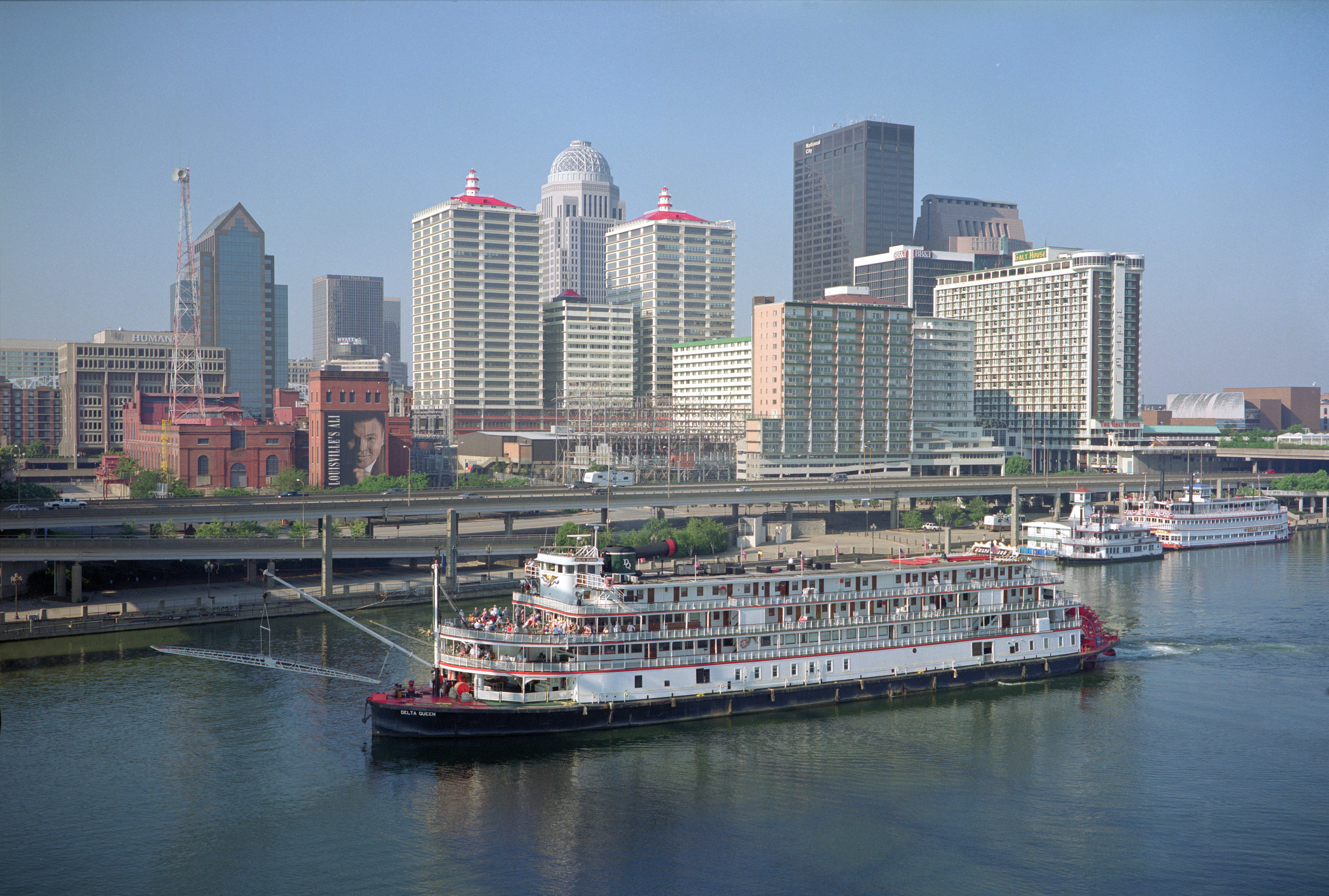
Louisville, Kentucky

Along the banks of the Ohio are some of the largest cities in their respective states: (Note: Cities and towns of pop. at least 25,000 and among the 10 largest in the state, and whose municipal boundary comes within less than a mile of the river. Florence, Kentucky, a city of 33,500 and that state's eighth-largest, for example, is a near miss because its northernmost boundary only comes within 2.7 miles of the river.) Pittsburgh, the third-largest city on the river and second-largest in Pennsylvania; Cincinnati, the second-largest city on the river and third-largest in Ohio; Louisville, the largest city on the river and in Kentucky as well; Evansville, the third-largest city in Indiana; Owensboro, the fourth-largest city in Kentucky; and three of the five largest cities in West Virginia—Huntington (second), Parkersburg (fourth), and Wheeling (fifth). Only Illinois, among the border states, has no significant cities on the river. There are hundreds of other cities, towns, villages and unincorporated populated places on the river, most of them very small.

Cities along the Ohio are also among the oldest cities in their respective states and among the oldest cities in the United States west of the Appalachian Mountains (by date of founding): Old Shawneetown, Illinois, 1748; Pittsburgh, Pennsylvania, 1758; Wheeling, West Virginia, 1769; Huntington, West Virginia, 1775; Louisville, Kentucky, 1779; Clarksville, Indiana, 1783; Maysville, Kentucky, 1784; Martin's Ferry, Ohio, 1785; Marietta, Ohio, 1788; Cincinnati, Ohio, 1788; Manchester, Ohio, 1790; Beaver, Pennsylvania, 1792; and Golconda, Illinois, 1798.

Other cities of interest include Cairo, Illinois, at the confluence of the Ohio with the Mississippi River and the southernmost and westernmost city on the river; and Beaver, Pennsylvania, the site of colonial Fort McIntosh and the northernmost city on the river. It is 548 miles as the crow flies between Cairo and Pittsburgh, but 981 miles by water. Direct water travel over the length of the river is obstructed by the Falls of the Ohio just below Louisville, Kentucky. The Ohio River Scenic Byway follows the Ohio River through Illinois, Indiana and Ohio ending at Steubenville, Ohio, on the river.

Before there were cities, there were colonial forts. These forts played a dominant role in the French and Indian War, Northwest Indian War and pioneering settlement of Ohio Country. Many cities got their start at or adjacent to the forts. Most were abandoned by 1800. Forts along the Ohio river include Fort Pitt (Pennsylvania), Fort McIntosh (Pennsylvania), Fort Randolph (West Virginia), Fort Henry (West Virginia), Fort Harmar (Ohio), Fort Washington (Ohio), and Fort-on-Shore and Fort Nelson (Kentucky). Short-lived, special-purpose forts included Fort Steuben (Ohio), Fort Finney (Indiana), Fort Finney (Ohio) and Fort Gower (Ohio). There was also the Newport Barracks (Kentucky) in the 19th century.

== See also ==
Lists of dams and bridges

- List of crossings of the Ohio River
- List of locks and dams of the Ohio River

Lists of rivers

- List of variant names of the Ohio River
- List of longest rivers of the United States (by main stem)
- List of most-polluted rivers
- List of rivers of Illinois
- List of rivers of Indiana
- List of rivers of Kentucky
- List of rivers of Ohio
- List of rivers of Pennsylvania
- List of rivers of West Virginia

Ohio Valley, etc.

- Appalachia
- Appalachian Ohio
- Ohio and Erie Canal
- Ohio River flood of 1937
- Watersheds of Illinois
- Ohio River Valley AVA
- Ohio Valley in Kentucky
- Ohio River Trail
- Ohio River Water Trail
- Falls of the Ohio National Wildlife Conservation Area
