= List of power stations in Ohio =

Sources of Ohio utility-scale electricity generation in gigawatt-hours, full-year 2025:
1. Natural gas: 80,646 (54.7%)
2. Coal: 35,857 (24.3%)
3. Nuclear: 17,142 (11.6%)
4. Solar: 7,906 (5.36%)
5. Wind: 2,975 (2.02%)
6. Petroleum: 1,302 (0.88%)
7. Other gases: 881 (0.60%)
8. Hydroelectric: 433 (0.29%)
9. Biomass: 280 (0.19%)

This is a list of electricity-generating power stations in the U.S. state of Ohio, sorted by type and name. In 2024, Ohio had a total summer capacity of 30.5 GW and a net generation of 142,746 GWh. In 2025, the electrical energy generation mix was 54.7% natural gas, 24.3% coal, 11.6% nuclear, 5.4% solar, 2% wind, 0.9% petroleum and petroleum coke, 0.6% other gases, 0.3% hydroelectric, and 0.2% biomass.

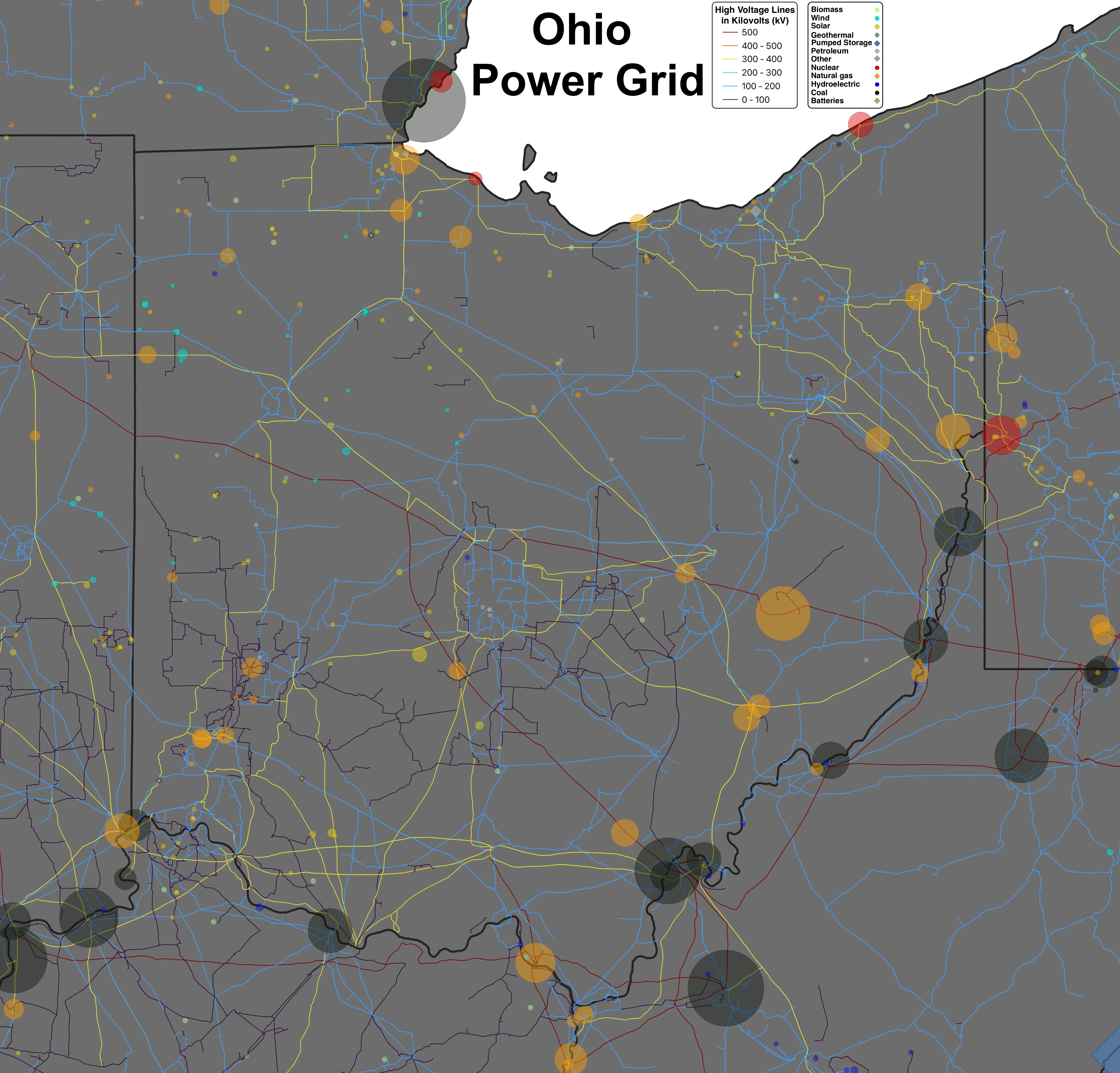
Ohio power grid

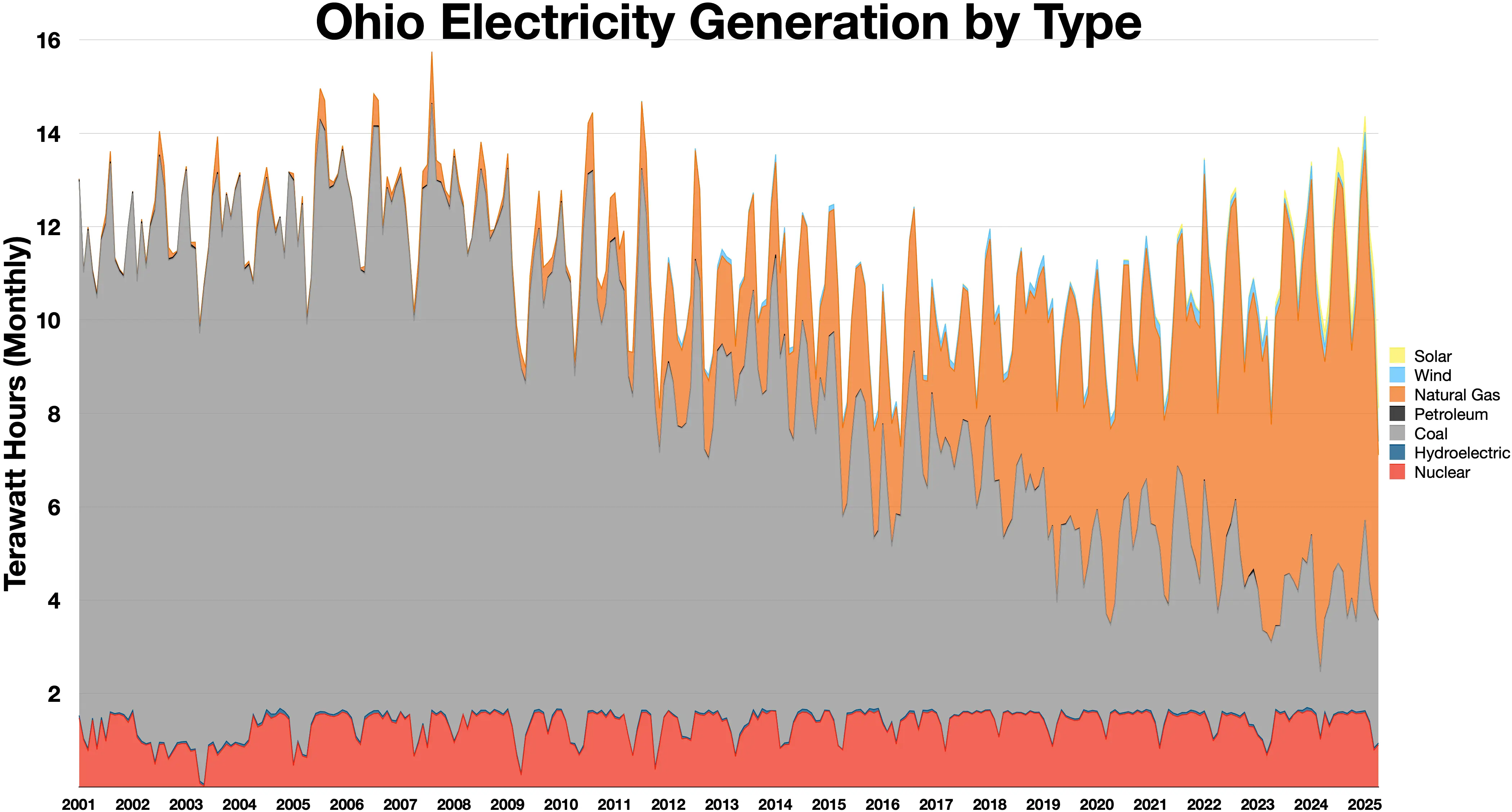
Ohio electricity generation by type

== Natural gas ==
Name	Location	Capacity (MW)	Owner	Type	Notes and links
Guernsey Power Station	Byesville	1875	Caithness Energy	Natural gas combined cycle	Opened in 2023
Hanging Rock Energy Facility	Hanging Rock	1430	Dynegy	Natural gas combined cycle	
Lordstown Energy Center	Lordstown	940	Clean Energy Future, LLC	Natural gas combined cycle	Opened in 2018, second unit planned
Oregon Clean Energy Center	Oregon	908	Ares Management	Natural gas combined cycle	Opened in 2017
Rolling Hills Generating Station	Wilkesville	865	Rolling Hills Generating LLC	Natural gas simple cycle (5 units)	
Tait Electric Generating Station	Moraine	681	Kimura Power, LLC	Natural gas combined cycle	Opened in 1967
Waterford Energy Center	Waterford	821	Waterford Power, LLC	Natural gas combined cycle	
Carroll County Energy	Carrollton	700	Advanced Power	Natural Gas combined cycle	Opened in 2018
Washington Energy Facility	Beverly	620	Dynegy	Natural gas combined cycle	
Darby Generating Station	Mount Sterling	480	Darby Power, LLC	Natural gas simple cycle	
Middletown Energy Center	Middletown	475	NTE Energy	Natural gas combined cycle	Opened in 2018
West Lorain Plant	Lorain	545	Starwood Energy	Natural gas simple cycle	
Robert P Mone Plant	Convoy	510	Buckeye Power	Natural gas simple cycle	
Fremont Energy Center	Fremont	707	American Municipal Power	Natural gas combined cycle	
Dresden Plant	Dresden	580	American Electric Power	Natural gas combined cycle	Opened in 2012
Madison Peaking Station	Trenton	677	Duke Energy	Natural gas simple cycle	
Long Ridge Energy Terminal	Hannibal	485	Long Ridge Energy	Hydrogen - natural gas blend	Opened in 2021

== Coal ==
Name	Location	Capacity (MW)	Owner	Type	Notes and links
Bay Shore	Oregon	150	Walleye Energy LLC	Petroleum coke (1 unit)	Opened in 1955.
Cardinal Power Plant	Brilliant	1800	Buckeye Power	Coal (3 units)	Unit 3 to be shut down in 2028, lowering generation capacity to 1180MW.
Gavin Power Plant	Cheshire	2640	Gavin Power, LLC	Coal (2 units)	Only runs 60% of the time. Up to 50% of Gavin’s cash flow comes from being on standby for emergency power.
Kyger Creek Power Plant	Cheshire	1086	Ohio Valley Electric Corporation	Coal (5 units)	Subsidized by the controversial HB6 Bill until 2030
Miami Fort Power Station	North Bend	1020	Vistra Corp	Coal (2 units)	Older units shut down in 2015. Planned retirement by year-end 2027 or earlier.
Toledo Refining Power Recovery	Oregon	6.0	Toledo Refining Co.	Petroleum coke (1 unit)	Opened in 1986.

== Nuclear ==
Name	Location	Capacity (MW)	Owner	Type	Notes and links
Perry Nuclear Generating Station	North Perry	1231	Energy Harbor	Nuclear boiling water reactor (1 unit)	
Davis–Besse Nuclear Power Station	Oak Harbor	960	Energy Harbor	Nuclear pressurized water reactor (1 unit)	

== Wind ==
Name	Location	Capacity (MW)	Turbines	Owner	Notes and links
AMP Wind Farm	Wood County	7.2		American Municipal Power	
Blue Creek Wind Farm	Paulding and Van Wert Counties	304	160	Iberdrola Renewables	Operational.
Timber Road Wind Farm	Paulding County	362.7	158	EDP Renewables	Operational.
Hog Creek	Hardin County	66	30		Operational.
Northwest Ohio	Paulding County	100	42		Operational.
Scioto Ridge	Hardin County & Logan County	249.8	75	Innogy	Operational.
Icebreaker	Cuyahoga County	20.7	6		Approved for construction.
Emerson Creek	Hardin County & Erie County	297.7	71		Approved for construction.
Grover Hill	Paulding County	150	23		Approved for construction.

== Solar ==
Name	Location	Capacity (MW)	Owner	Notes and links
Bowling Green Solar Facility	Bowling Green	20	NextEra	
Napoleon Solar Facility	Napoleon	3.54	American Municipal Power	
Wadsworth Rittman Rd. Facility	Wadsworth	2.625	American Municipal Power	
Wadsworth Seville Rd. Facility	Wadsworth	6.25	American Municipal Power	
Wyandot Solar Facility	Upper Sandusky	12	Public Service Enterprise Group	Opened in 2010.
Hardin I	Hardin County	150		Operational.
Hillcrest	Brown County	200		Operational.
New Market	Highland County	100		Operational.
Hardin II	Hardin County	170		Operational.
Yellowbud	Pickaway & Ross County	274		Operational.
Madison Fields	Madison County	180		Operational.
Willowbrook I	Brown County	150		Operational.
Nestlewood	Brown County	80		Operational.
Big Plain	Madison County	196		Operational.
Arche	Fulton County	107		Operational.
Hardin III	Hardin County	300		Operational.
AEUG Union	Union County	325		Operational.
Highland	Highland County	300		Operational.
Fox Squirrel	Madison County	577		Operational.
Atlanta Farms	Pickaway County	200		Operational.
Vinton	Vinton County	125		Approved for construction.
Alamo	Preble County	69.9		Approved for construction.
Angelina	Preble County	80		Approved for construction.
Powell Creek	Putnam County	150		Operational.
Wheatsborough	Erie County	125		Under construction.
Mark Center	Defiance County	110		Approved for construction.
Clearview	Champaign County	144		Operational.
Ross County	Ross County	120		Operational.
Cadence	Union County	275		Under construction.
Juliet	Wood County	101		Under construction.
Sycamore Creek	Crawford County	117		Under construction.
Marion County	Marion County	100		Under construction.
Union Ridge	Licking County	107.7		Approved for construction.
Tymochtee	Wyandot County	120		Approved for construction.
Nottingham	Harrison County	100		Approved for construction.
Wild Grains	Van Wert County	150		Approved for construction.
Dodson Creek	Highland County	117		Under construction.
Pleasant Prairie	Franklin County	250		Approved for construction.
Harvey	Licking County	350		Approved for construction.
Springwater	Franklin and Madison County	155		Approved for construction.
Border Basin	Hancock County	120		Approved for construction.
South Branch	Hancock County	130		Approved for construction.
Palomino	Hancock County	200		Approved for construction.
Blossom	Morrow and Marion County	144		Approved for construction.
Yellow Wood	Clinton County	300		Approved for construction.
Dixon Run	Jackson County	140		Approved for construction.
Oak Run	Madison County	800		Approved for construction.
Fountain Point	Logan County	280		Approved for construction.
Mink	Defiance & Paulding County	140		Approved for construction.
Clear Mountain	Clermont County	152.2		Approved for construction.

== Hydroelectricity ==
Name	Location	Capacity (MW)	Owner	Notes and links
O'Shaughnessy Dam	Dublin	5.2	City of Columbus	Offline as of August 2018. It is unknown when or if it will be fixed.
Hamilton Hydro	Hamilton	2	City of Hamilton	
Auglaize Hydroelectric Plant	Bryan	4.5	City of Bryan	
Captain Anthony Meldahl Locks and Dam	Felicity	105	American Municipal Power	Largest hydroelectric plant on the Ohio River. Located on the Kentucky side of the river. The City of Hamilton retains 51.4% of the power generation.
Greenup Lock and Dam	Franklin Furnace	70.2	American Municipal Power	
Racine Lock and Dam	Racine	20	AEP	
Belleville Lock and Dam	Reedsville	42	American Municipal Power	Hydroelectric plant is located on West Virginia side of the Ohio River.
Willow Island Lock and Dam	Newport	44	American Municipal Power	Hydroelectric plant is located on West Virginia side of the Ohio River.
Hannibal Locks and Dam	Hannibal	19	New Martinsville Hannibal Hydro	Hydroelectric plant is located on West Virginia side of the Ohio River.

== Battery storage ==
Name	Location	Capacity (MW)	Owner	Notes and links
Battery Utility of Ohio	Sunbury	4	Battery Utility of Ohio	
AEP Bluffton NaS	Bluffton	2	Ohio Power Co	
HMV Minster Energy Storage System	Minster	7	Half Moon Ventures LLC	
Willey Battery Utility	Hamilton	6	Willey Battery Utility	
Clinton Battery	Blanchester	10	Clinton Battery Utility	
Beckjord Power Station	New Richmond	4	Duke Energy	

== Closed plants ==
Name	Location	Capacity (MW)	Owner	Type	Notes and links
Ashtabula Power Plant	Ashtabula	244	FirstEnergy	Coal	Closed in 2015
W.C. Beckjord Power Station	New Richmond	1304	Duke Energy, DPL Inc., AEP	Coal (6 units)	Closed in 2014
R.E. Burger Power Station	Shadyside	568	FirstEnergy	Coal	Closed in 2011
Conesville Power Plant	Conesville	2005	AEP, AES/DPL Inc.	6 units: coal & oil	Units 5-6 shut down in 2019 and Unit 4 closed in 2020.
Eastlake Power Plant	Eastlake	1257	FirstEnergy	Coal (units 1-5) / natural gas (unit 6)	Units 4-5 closed 2012, Units 1-3 closed in 2015, Unit 6 closed 2021.
O.H. Hutchings Station	Miamisburg	414	DPL Inc.	Coal	Closed in 2013
Richard H. Gorsuch Station	Marietta	200	American Municipal Power	Coal	Built by Union Carbide in 1951 as Marietta Steam Plant, sold to American Municipal Power in 1988 and renamed to Richard H. Gorsuch, closed in 2012.
Killen Station	Wrightsville	618	AES/DPL Inc., Dynegy	Coal (1 unit)	Sold to AES 2012. Closed in 2018.
Lake Shore Power Plant	Cleveland	245	FirstEnergy	Coal	Closed in 2015 and demolished in 2017.
Muskingum River Power Plant	Beverly	1375	American Electric Power	Coal (5 units)	Closed in 2015
Philo Power Plant	Philo	510	Ohio Power	Coal	Closed in 1975; Philo Unit 6 was the first commercial supercritical steam-electric generating unit in the world, and it could operate short-term at ultra-supercritical levels.
Picway Power Plant	Lockbourne	220	AEP	Coal	Closed in 2015
E.M. Poston Power Plant	Nelsonville		AEP	Coal	Closed in 1987
Shelby Municipal Light Plant	Shelby	37	City of Shelby	Coal (4 units)	Closed in 2013, power monitoring remains
Sidney Waterworks and Electric Light Building	Sidney		City of Sidney	Hydroelectric (1 unit)	Began generation in 1900
J.M. Stuart Station	Aberdeen	2318	AES/DPL Inc., Dynegy, and AEP	Coal (4 units)	Sold to AES 2012 Closed in 2018.
Tidd Plant	Brilliant	220	Ohio Power	Coal	Retired in 1976. Was used as a demonstration for pressurized fluidized bed combustion (PFBC) for four years, 1991–1995.
Toronto Power Plant	Toronto		Ohio Edison	Coal	Closed in 1993
Trash Burning Power Plant	Columbus		SWACO	Waste-to-energy	Closed in 1994
Avon Lake Power Station	Avon Lake	680	NRG Energy	Coal	Built in 1925–1926; closed in 2021; imploded in 2024
William H. Zimmer Power Station	Moscow	1300	Vistra Corp	Coal	Closed in May 2022.
W. H. Sammis Power Plant	Stratton, Ohio	2,233	FirstEnergy	Coal	Closed May 3, 2023

== See also ==
- List of power stations in the United States
