= Bob Vogel =

American football player (born 1941)

- Vogel in 1970

No. 72
- Position: Tackle

Personal information
- Born: September 23, 1941 (age 85); Columbus, Ohio, U.S.
- Listed height: 6 ft 5 in (1.96 m)
- Listed weight: 250 lb (113 kg)

Career information
- High school: Brilliant (OH); Toronto (OH); Massillon Washington (OH)
- College: Ohio State (1960–1962)
- NFL draft: 1963: 1st round, 5th overall pick
- AFL draft: 1963: 3rd round, 23rd overall pick

Career history
- Baltimore Colts (1963–1972)

Awards and highlights
- Super Bowl champion (V); NFL champion (1968); 5× All-Pro (1964, 1965, 1967, 1968, 1969); 5× Pro Bowl (1964, 1965, 1967, 1968, 1971); NCAA Division I national champion (1961); Second-team All-American (1962); 2× Second-team All-Big Ten (1961, 1962); Ohio State Athletics Hall of Fame (2014)

Career NFL statistics
- Games played: 140
- Games started: 140
- Fumble recoveries: 5
- Stats at Pro Football Reference

Robert Louis Vogel (born September 23, 1941) is an American former professional football player who was an offensive lineman for the Baltimore Colts of the National Football League (NFL) from 1963 to 1972. Vogel was a mainstay on the offensive line that protected quarterback Johnny Unitas, appearing in Super Bowl III and Super Bowl V with the Colts. During his career, Vogel was selected to five Pro Bowls and earned five All-Pro selections.

== Early life ==
Bob Vogel was born on September 23, 1941, in Columbus, Ohio to Mr. and Mrs. Elmer W. Vogel. Vogel's father was a construction project manager, and the family moved several times throughout his childhood due to his father's work. Vogel lived in Columbus until his family moved to Brilliant, Ohio, where he attended high school at Brilliant High School his freshman year. Vogel then transferred to Toronto Junior/Senior High School in Toronto, Ohio for his sophomore and junior years. While at Toronto, Vogel was a four sport letterman in football, basketball, baseball, and track and field. On the football team, Vogel starred at end and he played as a center in basketball.

Vogel moved to Massillon, Ohio for his senior year of high school, attending Massillon Washington High School. On the Washington football team, Vogel starred on both offense and defense and earned first-team All-Ohio honors in 1958. Vogel was also named to the Scholastic Magazine 1958 All-America high school football team. Vogel continued to star in basketball at Washington, earning an All-Ohio honorable mention. Vogel also set Washington school records in the discus and shot put as a member of the track and field team.

Vogel was a highly sought after football recruit coming out of high school. He received scholarship offers from 75 schools, including Notre Dame, Michigan, and Ohio State. Vogel chose to play at Ohio State, having grown up in Columbus.

== College career ==
Vogel played at Ohio State for longtime head coach Woody Hayes. Vogel was named a starter for Ohio State as a sophomore, where he was moved from end to offensive tackle prior to the start of the season. Vogel protected Buckeye quarterback, and future Colts teammate, Tom Matte, who threw for 737 yards and eight touchdowns and ran for 682 yards and two touchdowns during the 1960 season. Ohio State went 7–2 that year and finished at #8 in the AP poll.

In 1961, Matte graduated and was replaced by quarterback Joe Sparma, who had played at Washington High School in Massillon with Vogel. Vogel again started at tackle, and the Buckeyes went undefeated with an 8–0–1 record. Ohio State won the Big Ten Conference title and was voted as the national champion by the Football Writers Association of America (FWAA).

Coming into his 1962 senior season, Vogel earned pre-season All-America honors and was named as a captain of the Buckeyes football team. Although Ohio State was expected to repeat as national champions, the team faltered and finished the season at 6–3. Vogel earned Third-team Big Ten Conference and Second-Team All-America honors.

Vogel was enshrined in The Ohio State University Athletics Hall of Fame in 2014.

== Professional career ==
Vogel was selected by the Baltimore Colts in the first round, 5th overall selection, of the 1963 NFL draft. Vogel was also selected by the Boston Patriots in the third round of the 1963 AFL draft. Vogel chose to play with the Colts, where he spent his entire 10-year NFL career.

Vogel was reunited with Ohio State teammate Tom Matte, now playing halfback for the Colts. He and fellow Colts rookies John Mackey and Jerry Logan became immediate starters for the Colts under new head coach Don Shula. Vogel was placed into a veteran starting offensive line that featured future Pro Football Hall of Fame member Jim Parker, who was moved to guard, Dick Szymanski, Alex Sandusky, and George Preas.

In Vogel's second season, the Colts went 12–2 and won the NFL West Division. They faced the Cleveland Browns in the 1964 NFL Championship, losing 27–0.

In 1968, the Colts went 13–1 and won the NFL Coastal Division. After beating the Minnesota Vikings in the Divisional round, they faced the Cleveland Browns in the 1968 NFL Championship Game. The Colts won this game 34–0 and moved on to face the Jets in Super Bowl III, where the Jets upset the Colts 16–7.

In 1970, the Colts won the AFC East Division and went 11–2–1 in the regular season under first-year head coach Don McCafferty. The Colts beat the Cincinnati Bengals and Oakland Raiders in the 1970–71 NFL playoffs to face the Dallas Cowboys in Super Bowl V. In what later became known as "The Blunder Bowl" due to the poor level of play, the Colts won 16–13 on a last second field goal by kicker Jim O'Brien. Vogel later said of the 1970 Super Bowl winning season, "How many teams that blow a Super Bowl get a second chance? I remember a bunch of us sitting in the locker room during training camp [in 1970] and looking at ourselves. Someone said, 'We're an aging team and if we don't get it done now, it ain't never gonna happen.' That thought drove us all season."

As the 1972 season drew to a close, Vogel announced it was his last as a Colt. He retired following the conclusion of that season.

== Legacy ==
Vogel was a key figure of the Colts offensive line that protected Johnny Unitas during the 1960s. Vogel was known for his finesse style of play, which made up for his small size. He was cited as being one of the smartest players on the field. Vogel retired at the age of 30, and noted that he left the game on his own terms rather than having his entire identity be known for playing football.

Vogel started in all 140 games of his 10-year career, earning trips to the Pro Bowl in 1964, 1965, 1967, 1968, and 1971. He was named to the AP All Pro Second-Team in 1965 and 1968, and the UPI All-Pro First-Team in 1968 and Second-Team in 1965 and 1969.

In 2021, the Professional Football Researchers Association named Vogel to the PFRA Hall of Very Good Class of 2021.

== Personal life ==
Following his retirement from football, Vogel became the general manager of a television station in Harford County, Maryland. He spent his post-football career in sales and marketing.

Vogel and his wife had four children and became foster parents, caring for 48 children over the years. Vogel is a born again Christian and often visits prisons and other countries to proselytize and provide healthcare in places such as Cuba and Honduras.
