= Conesville =

Conesville may refer to a place in the United States:

- Conesville, Iowa
- Conesville, New York
- Conesville, Ohio
  - Conesville Power Plant, a power plant located near the namesake village of Conesville, Ohio

== See also ==
- Glenwood, Iowa, formerly Coonsville
