= Picway Power Plant =

- Country: United States
- Location: Harrison Township, Pickaway County, Ohio, near Lockbourne, Ohio
- Coordinates: 39°47′37″N 83°00′36″W
- Status: Demolished
- Commission date: Units 1–2: 1926; Unit 3: 1943; Unit 4: 1949; Unit 5: 1955
- Decommission date: Units 1–2: 1972; Units 3–4: 1980; Unit 5: 2015
- Owner: American Electric Power (AEP)
- Operator: American Electric Power (AEP)

Thermal power station
- Primary fuel: Coal
- Cooling source: Scioto River

Power generation
- Nameplate capacity: 220 MW

Picway Power Plant was a 220 megawatt (MW) coal power plant located west of Lockbourne in Pickaway County, Ohio. The plant generated electricity from 1926 until its closure in 2015. It was operated by American Electric Power (AEP).

== History ==
Picway began operations with two units in September 1926. The plant was operated by the Columbus Railway Power and Light Company, a forerunner of AEP. The two units had a combined capacity of 60 MW. The facility originally used low-profile electric locomotives capable of both third rail and overhead power to move ash cars under the boilers, and move coal around the property; one of these locomotives still exists in operating condition at the Ohio Railway Museum.

Construction of Unit 3 was temporarily halted in 1942 by the War Production Board (WPB) as the building of new non-essential electricity production was suspended for the war effort. Unit 3 officially came online in 1943 with capacity of 30 MW. Unit 4 began commercial operations in 1949 after more than two years of construction at a cost of $5 million. The unit generated 30 MW. The final unit, Unit 5, began commercial operations in 1955 after two years of construction at a cost of $15 million. The unit generated 100 MW and gave Picway a maximum nameplate capacity of 220 MW.

Rail service to supply coal for Picway was provided by the Scioto Valley Railway and Power Company which was later renamed the Ohio-Midland Light and Power Company in 1932. The trackage to the plant was initially powered using third rail, but became dieselized in 1955. It was the last railroad in Ohio to be powered by third rail. The conversion to diesel allowed coal to be interchanged by rail at Lockbourne, instead of Obetz or Groveport previously. Coal deliveries for Picway were switched from rail to truck beginning in 1972, but rail service resumed temporarily during the Blizzard of 1978 when truck deliveries could not get through the snow.

== Environmental mitigation ==
Electrostatic precipitators, which are used to prevent fly ash from being released into the atmosphere, were installed at Picway in 1974. A LO-NOx burner was added to Picway in 1995 in order to reduce nitrogen oxide (NO_{x}) emissions. Picway began generating electricity with biomass and later biodiesel in 2010 as a way to lower operating costs and produce renewable energy.

== Retirement and closure ==
Units 1 and 2 were retired in 1972. Units 3 and 4 ceased operations in October 1980 in order for Columbus & Southern Ohio Electric to attain pollution reductions from the Ohio's State Implementation Plan (SIP). The Ohio Environmental Council had argued for an expedited shut down before October 1980, but this was rejected by the Sixth Circuit Court of Appeals. By 2010, Picway generated electricity only during the peak summer months as a cost-cutting measure. With changes in federal clean air rules by the Environmental Protect Agency (EPA) on the horizon, AEP announced in 2011 they would retire Picway. AEP cited the Cross-State Air Pollution Rule (CSAPR) and Mercury and Air Toxics Standards (MATS) for the retirement of Picway. The power plant closed in May 2015. The facility and land were sold to a real estate company specializing in brownfield redevelopment in 2016.

== Incidents ==
A worker died in 1948 from electrocution after accidentally touching a switch while replacing an oil circuit breaker.

== See also ==
- List of power stations in Ohio
