= Alvheim FPSO =

Norwegian FPSO in the North Sea

Alvheim Field (Alvheim FPSO; Block 24/6 and 25/4) is a Norwegian oil and gas field located in the northern part of the North Sea near the border with the British sector, consisting mainly of Boafält, Kneler Field and Kameleon Field. Parts of the Boafält are located in the British sector at block 9/15. The reservoir consists of early-tier sandstone. The depth of the area is 120–130 meters. The production ship is located approximately 12 km west of Heimdal Gassenter, at 59.56684°N 1.99731°E.

== The field ==
Alvheim field was found in 1998 and recovery licenses 088 BS and 036 C for blocks 24/6 and 25/4 were awarded in 2003. The field was approved by the King of Norway in government council on 6 October 2004. The operator is Aker BP.

== Geology ==
The reservoir consists of sandstone. Recoverable reserves were estimated by submitting plans for development and operation to 23.5 million standard cubic meters (Sm^{3}) of oil and 5.7 billion Sm^{3} of gas but has since been updated to 27.5 million Sm^{3} of oil and 8.1 billion Sm^{3} of gas.

== The development concept ==
The field is built with wellhead basins on the seabed that are linked to the production ship Alvheim FPSO. The production vessel is 252 meters long and 42 meters wide and has the capacity to store 560,000 barrels of oil. The oil will be transported to land by tanker, while the production of rich gas is conducted in a pipeline from Alvheim to the Scottish Area Gas Evacuation (SAGE) system in the British sector. The Volund field (operator: Aker BP) and Vilje field (operator: Aker BP) are also linked to Alvheim FPSO. Production at Alvheim started June 8, 2008.

The multipurpose ship MST Odin has been rebuilt as a production vessel at Alvheim. MST Odin was previously owned by Statoil. The boat was completed in September 2001 and was previously used as tanker. The facility is under a maritime operating concept with DNV class and carries the Norwegian flag from the Norwegian Maritime Directorate. Marathon assumes that the device is certified on the field the 20 years it is expected to produce, and is not to be landed for main classification.

Pressure relief using gas lift is the chosen recovery strategy at Alvheim. The field is extracted in three phases. In phase I, 12 horizontal wells are drilled, three of them with two branches. Oil products will be drilled from freestanding beams, which are coupled to manifolds prior to pipeline transfer to MST Odin via a riser base.

There are also two wells for injection of produced water. These will be free standing and connect directly to pipeline without manifolds.

On the production ship, the oil will be stabilized and stored before export from the tanker. Due to weight and cost, the operator has chosen not to fully process the gas on the production vessel. The part of the gas that does not contribute to gas lift is exported as rich gas in a 14-inch gas pipeline from Alvheim, across to the British shelf and linked to the SAGE system. Total length of the pipe is 35.5 km. The oil is picked up on the float of tankers.

The operator plans to produce oil until 2022 before the gas is blown down. In total, the life of the field will be 20 years.

Mærsk was a contractor at Alvheim in the early years, but since then Marathon has taken over. The owner and operator from 2016 is Aker BP.

== Drilling ==
Aker BP has drilled and completed two water injection wells and ten production wells on the Alvheim field, of which an existing exploration well is sidebored and completed as a production well.

The drilling of the production wells is done by Odfjell Drilling using Deepsea Bergen. The same drilling contractor was also used while drilling exploration wells on the field.

The water injection wells are drilled vertically and the purpose of these will be to receive produced water pumped into the Utsira formation. The wells are supplemented without a safety valve, as the reservoir pressure in the Utsira formation is not high enough to cause outflow of water.

Production wells are horizontal wells with horizontal sections up to 2441 meters in length.

Transocean Winner (released) and Transocean Arctic (currently) have been drilling on these and other nearby fields in recent years.

== Power ==
There are gas powered turbines to generate electric power for the process. These are equipped with elements to regain heat from the exhaust gas and have diesel as an alternative. It is installing Low-NOx technology on these.

== Open drainage systems ==
Aker BP has installed a drainage system that has separate collector pipes for drainage from classified and unclassified areas, but will have a collective tank for drainage from these areas.

== Subsea ==
The subsea system at Alvheim consists of single wells that are connected to a manifold with production pipes and gas injection pipes. In the manifold, the well stream is mixed with well flow from the other single wells, and the production then flows into a pipeline to the riser base under the ship (FPSO). There are four such manifolds, each with space to connect and control four wells: one over Boa; two over Kneler (Kneler A and Kneler B); and one above East Kameleon. Flexible ladders associated with the riser base transport the oil and gas to the processing plant on the ship.

In Phase II and III there will be new production wells to ensure an appropriate pressure relief of East Kameleon and of Kameleon gas capabilities. Final placement and timing of these will be based on experience gained through early production years. The system has been planned to allow for possible attachment of future third-party manufacturers. It has been taken into account that the Klegg field should be linked.

The well flow from the manifolds to the riser base on the seabed is transferred into 10-inch pipes. The expansion also includes 4 inch pipes for gas lift and control cables for signal transmission and transmission of hydraulic fluid and chemicals. The distance from the bottom of the production vessel varies from 2.5 km to 4.9 km.

The material selection in the pipes on the seabed up to the risers is carbon steel and is based on chemical injection to suppress internal corrosion. The pipes from the manifold to the riser base must be spiked.
