= Cardinal Power Plant =

Coal-fired power plant in Jefferson, Ohio, United States

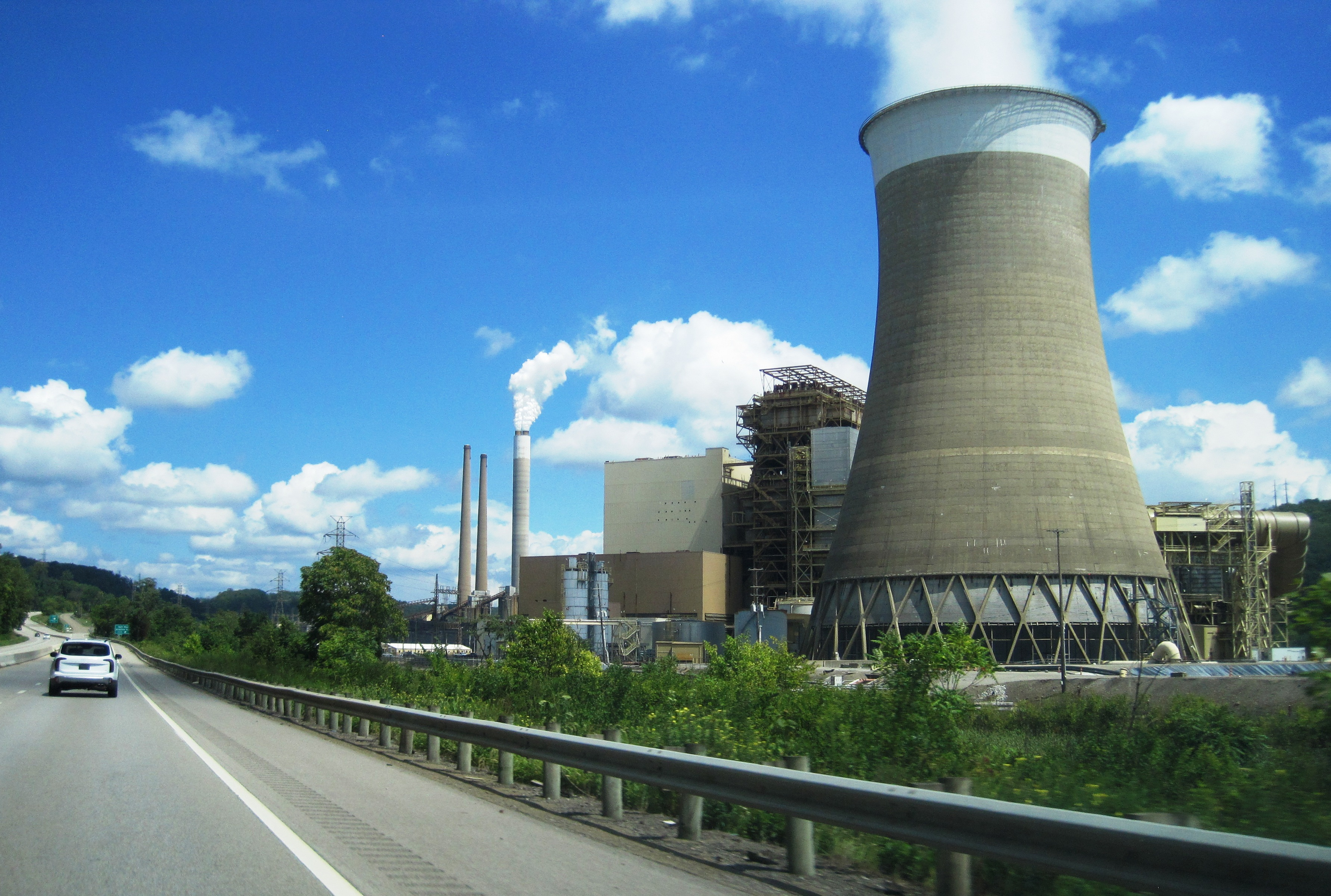
- Cardinal Power Plant viewed from Ohio State Route 7
- Country: United States
- Location: Wells Township, Jefferson County, near Brilliant, Ohio
- Coordinates: 40°15′8″N 80°38′54″W
- Status: Operational
- Commission date: Units 1–2: 1967; Unit 3: 1977
- Owners: AEP Generation Resources (Unit 1); Buckeye Power (Units 2–3)
- Operator: Buckeye Power

Thermal power station
- Primary fuel: Coal
- Cooling source: Ohio River

Power generation
- Nameplate capacity: 1,800 MW

External links
- Commons: Related media on Commons

Cardinal Power Plant is a 1.8-gigawatt (1,800 MW) coal power plant located south of Brilliant, Ohio, in Jefferson County, Ohio. The power plant has three units. Cardinal is co-owned with Unit 1 owned by American Electric Power's (AEP) subsidiary, AEP Generation Resources. Units 2–3 are owned by Buckeye Power, a utility cooperative. It began operations in 1967.

== History ==
Construction of Cardinal started in November 1963. The project was a joint venture of Ohio Power (a forerunner of AEP) and Buckeye Power. Buckeye Power obtained loans from the Rural Electric Administration and financing through Kuhn, Loeb & Co. and the Ohio Company. Cardinal was built adjacent to Ohio Power's Tidd Plant. The plant is named after the State Bird of Ohio, the cardinal. Units 1 and 2 began commercial generation in 1967 at a cost of $131 million. Unit 3 began generation in 1977 after six years of construction at a cost of $220 million. In 2017, AEP and Buckeye Power reached an agreement for Buckeye Power to operate all three units at Cardinal.

== Environmental mitigation ==
To further reduce nitrogen oxide (NO_{x}) emissions, AEP and Buckeye Power announced in 2001 they would install selective catalytic reduction (SCR) systems to complement their LO-NOx burners at Cardinal. The SCRs would decrease NO_{x} emissions at the plant from 30% to 90%. Between 2005 and 2010, flue-gas desulfurization (FGD) equipment were installed to all three units at Cardinal with Units 1 and 2 costing $300 million to construct. The FGD equipment would reduce sulfur dioxide (SO_{2}) emissions by 98%. A year after it was installed, inspectors found severe corrosion in its tank vessel. AEP negotiated a settlement with Black & Veatch, the contractor who installed the FGD equipment, to address the corrosion. Instead of constructing a new chimney for Unit 3's FGD system, AEP retrofitted a cooling tower to release waste heat into the atmosphere. AEP announced in 2015 that its Cardinal unit will be converted into a natural gas power plant by 2030 in order to comply with Environmental Protection Agency (EPA) standards. The Public Utilities Commission of Ohio (PUCO) approved of the conversion.

== Incidents ==
During construction in June 1965, three workers were killed when a pump casing fell into a well.

An explosion killed one worker and injured four in June 1984.

== See also ==
- List of power stations in Ohio
