= Dresden Plant =

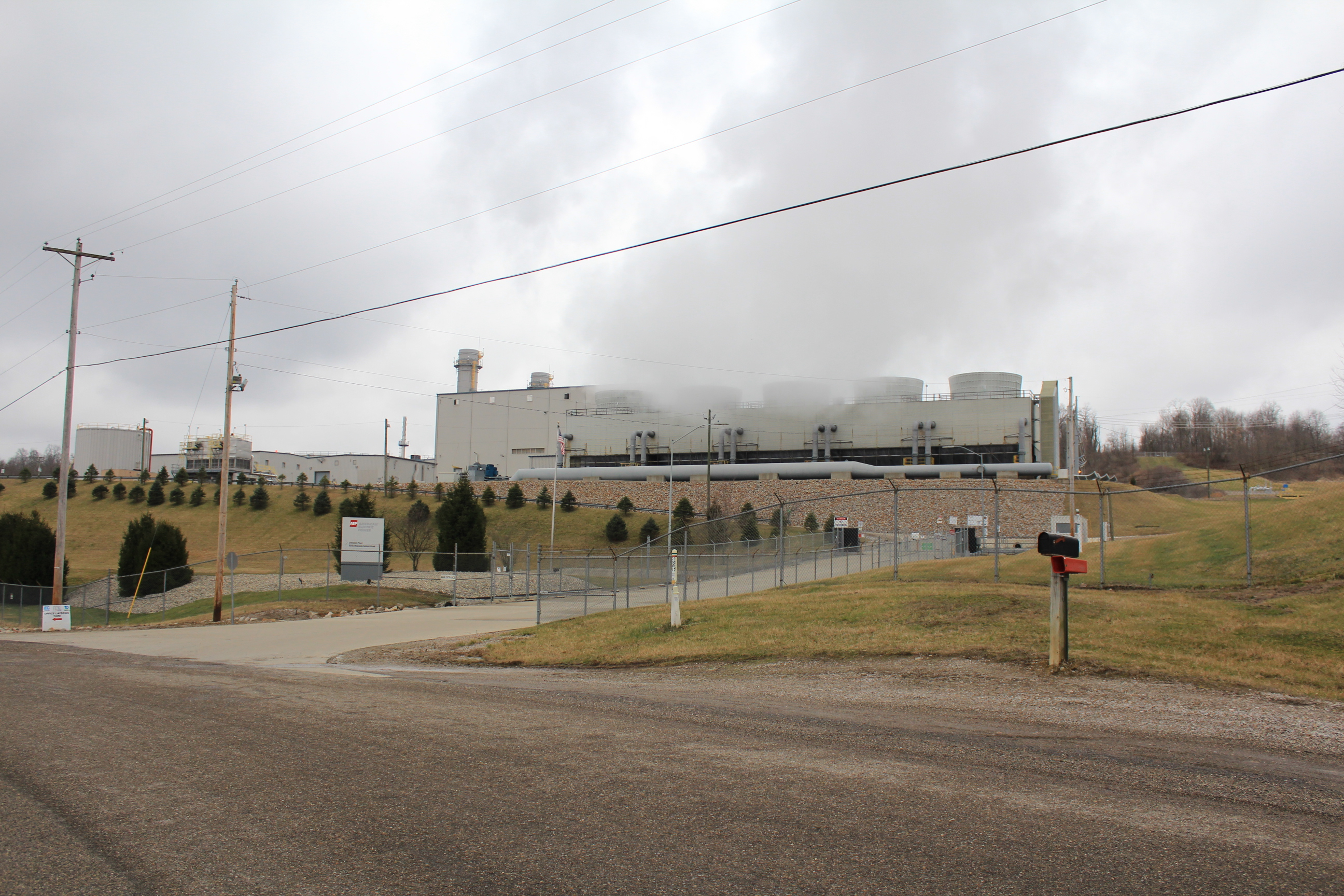
- Dresden Plant in 2020
- Country: United States
- Location: Cass Township in Muskingum County, near Dresden, Ohio
- Coordinates: 40°5′35″N 82°1′35″W
- Status: Operational
- Commission date: Units 1–3: 2012
- Owner: American Electric Power (AEP)
- Operator: American Electric Power (AEP)

Thermal power station
- Primary fuel: Natural gas
- Cooling source: Muskingum River
- Combined cycle?: Yes

Power generation
- Nameplate capacity: 580 MW

The Dresden Plant is a 580 megawatt (MW), natural gas power plant located south of Dresden, Ohio in Muskingum County, Ohio. The plant began operations in 2012 and is currently owned by American Electric Power (AEP).

== History ==
The Dresden Plant was first conceived in 2000 when Dresden Energy, LLC, a subsidiary of Dominion Energy, proposed the construction of a combined cycle power plant utilizing natural gas as its energy source. Construction began in 2001, but numerous delays and rising natural gas prices made the plant uneconomical at that time. In 2007, AEP would purchase the partially built Dresden Plant from a subsidiary of Dominion for $85 million. The Dresden Plant would remain in an idle state with a skeleton crew until 2011 when AEP recommenced construction at the site. Commercial operations began on February 1, 2012. The total cost for the construction of the plant was $366 million.

== Equipment ==
The Dresden Plant features three units. There are two, General Electric, 7FA gas turbines which are fed into heat recovery steam generators designed by Vogt-NEM and a single, General Electric, D11 steam turbine generator. Both gas turbines are equipped with LO-NOx burners and selective catalytic reduction (SCR) systems to reduce nitrogen oxide (NO_{x}) emissions.

== See also ==
- List of power stations in Ohio
