= Miami Fort Power Station =

Power plant in Hamilton County, Ohio

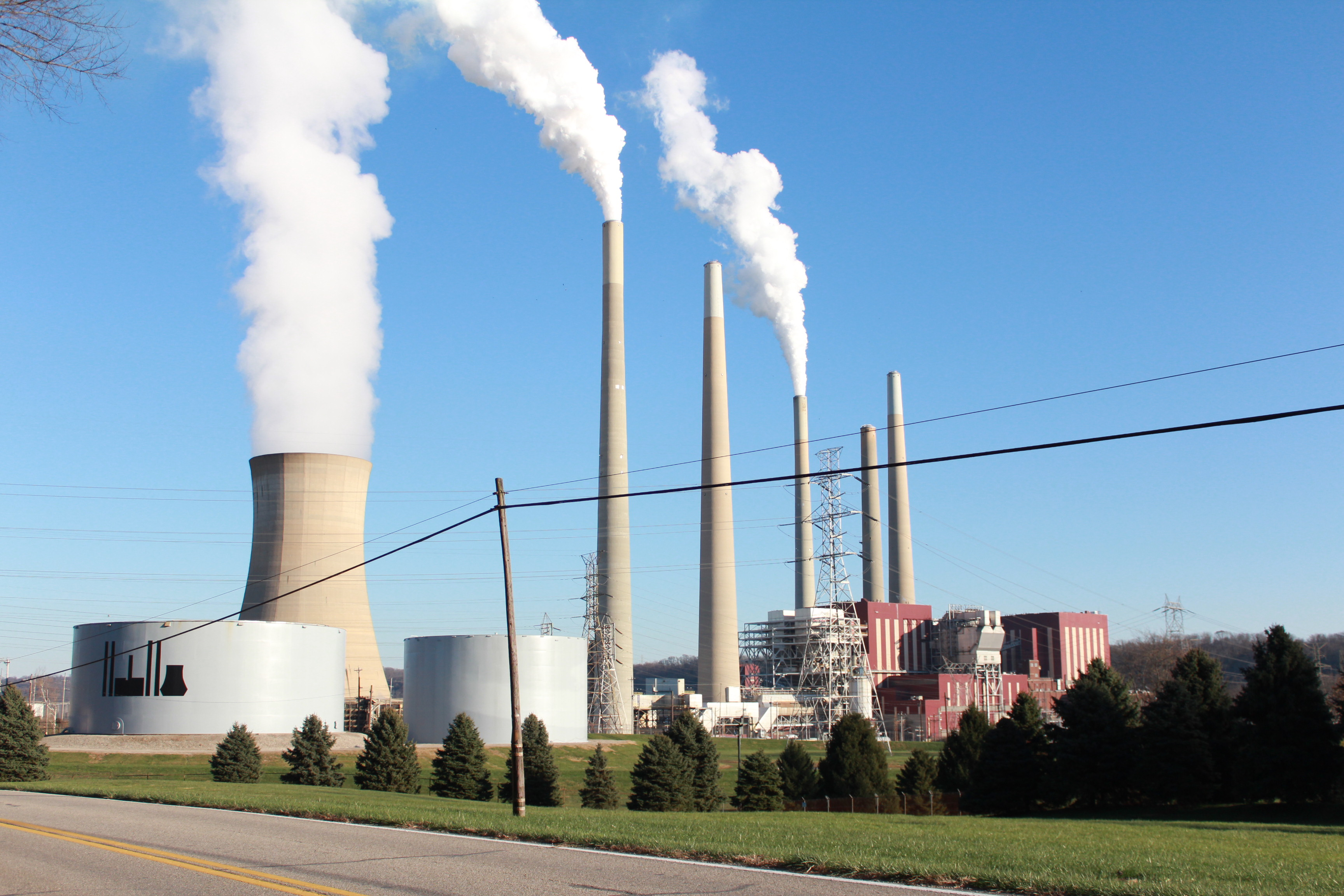
- Miami Fort viewed from Brower Rd
- Country: United States
- Location: Miami Township, Hamilton County, near North Bend, Ohio
- Coordinates: 39°06′56″N 84°48′18″W
- Status: Operational
- Commission date: Coal Unit 5: December, 1949; Coal Unit 6: November, 1960; Coal Unit 7: May, 1975; Coal Unit 8: February, 1978; Oil Unit GT3: July, 1971; Oil Unit GT4: August, 1971; Oil Unit GT5: September, 1971; Oil Unit GT6: October, 1971
- Decommission date: Coal Unit 5: 2010; Coal Unit 6: June, 2015
- Owners: Dynegy, a division of Vistra Corp

Thermal power station
- Primary fuel: Bituminous coal, distillate fuel oil
- Turbine technology: Steam turbine (coal), gas turbine (oil)
- Cooling source: Ohio River, closed-cycle cooling tower

Power generation
- Nameplate capacity: 1,321 MW

The Miami Fort Generating Station is a dual-fuel power generating facility. It is a major coal-fired electrical power station, supplemented with a small oil-fired facility. Miami Fort is located in Miami Township, Hamilton County, immediately east of the tripoint of Indiana, Kentucky, and Ohio. Miami Fort Station is named for the nearby Miami Fort (not to be confused with Fort Miami in the same state).

== Units and ownership ==
A cooling tower was commissioned in the 1970s by Cincinnati Gas and Electric Company (CG&E), a forerunner of Duke Energy, in order to meet pollution control mandates set by the State of Ohio. Unit 5 was permanently shut down in 2010. Unit 6 ceased coal generation on June 1, 2015. The plant used to be co-owned by Duke Energy and Dayton Power & Light (DP&L). In August 2014, Duke Energy sold its stake in both the coal and oil facilities to Dynegy. DP&L continued to own its remaining share of ownership until 2017 when it sold its stake to Dynegy.

Miami Fort Generating Station, North Bend, OH
	Combined Total	Coal-Fired Facilities	Oil-Fired Facilities
Units	6	2	4
Aggregate Capacity	1,378 MW	1,243 MW	78 MW

== Environmental impact ==
With its oldest unit dating back to late 1940s, the plant was ranked 36th on the United States list of dirtiest power plants in terms of sulphur dioxide emissions per megawatt-hour of electrical energy produced in 2006.

== Retirement ==
In September 2020, Vistra announced its plans to retire the power station by year-end 2027 or earlier. in 2025, the closure was delayed.

== See also ==
- List of power stations in Ohio
