= Darby Generating Station =

American natural gas peaker plant

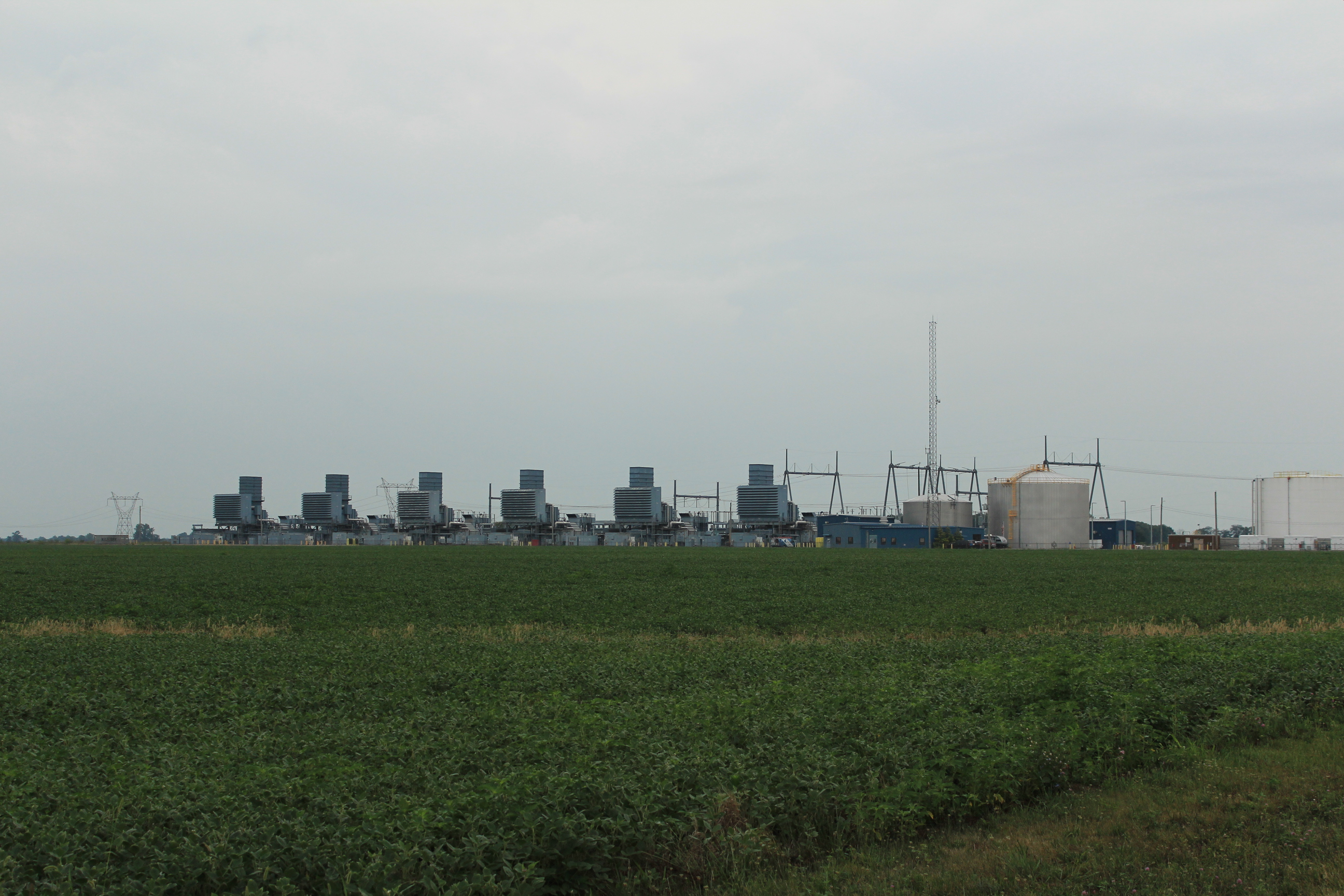
- Darby Generating Station viewed from the east along Adkins Road
- Country: United States
- Location: Darby Township, Pickaway County, near Mount Sterling, Ohio
- Coordinates: 39°42′44″N 83°10′38″W
- Status: Operational
- Commission date: Units 1–4: 2001; Units 5–6: 2002
- Owner: Lightstone Generation LLC

Thermal power station
- Primary fuel: Natural gas

Power generation
- Nameplate capacity: 480 MW

External links
- Commons: Related media on Commons

Darby Generating Station is a 480 megawatt (MW), natural gas peaker plant located in Darby Township, Pickaway County near Mount Sterling, Ohio. The plant is currently owned by Lightstone Generation LLC, a 50-50 joint venture of The Blackstone Group and ArcLight Capital Partners. The plant has six units and began operations in 2001.

== Background ==
The project was first announced in 1999 by Dayton Power & Light (DP&L) to address projected electricity shortages. The first four units of Darby began operations in 2001 with Units 5 and 6 beginning the following year at a cost of $55 million. The total cost of the project was estimated to be at $183 million. The peaker plant is connected by a 345kV power line originating from the former J.M. Stuart Station located in Adams County, Ohio. In 2007, DP&L sold Darby to American Electric Power (AEP) for $102 million. AEP would later sell Darby as a part of $2.17 billion deal to The Blackstone Group and ArcLight Capital Partners in 2016.

== See also ==
- List of power stations in Ohio
