= Beckjord Power Station =

Power plant in Clermont County, Ohio

Beckjord Generating Station
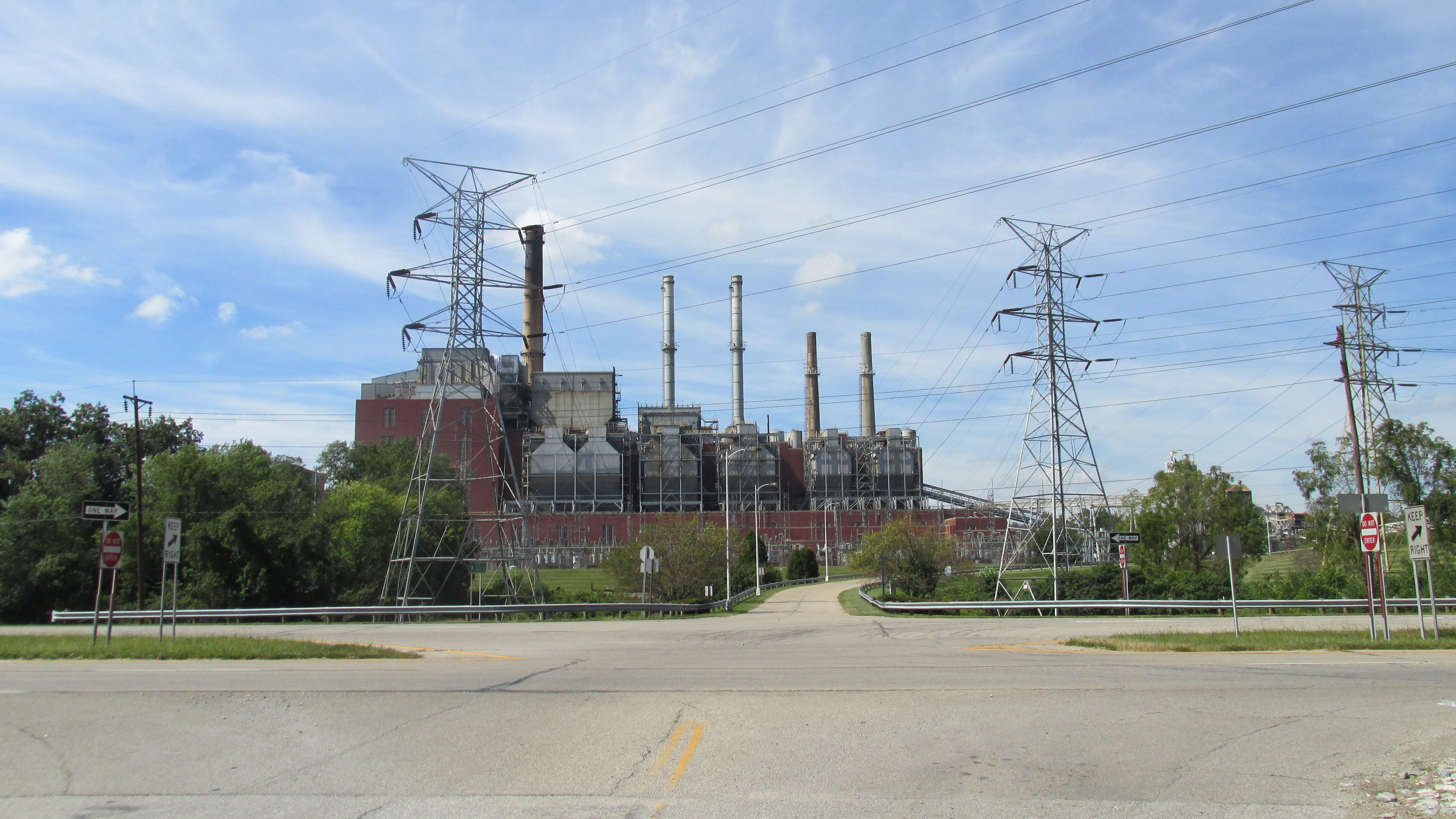
- Country: United States
- Location: Pierce Township, Clermont County, near New Richmond, Ohio
- Coordinates: 38°59′31.5″N 84°17′50″W
- Status: Demolished
- Commission date: Unit 1: 1952; Unit 2: 1953; Unit 3: 1954; Unit 4: 1958; Unit 5: 1962; Unit 6: 1969; Units GT1–GT4: 1972
- Decommission date: Unit 1: 2012; Units 2–3: 2013; Units 4–6: 2014; Units GT1–GT4: 2014
- Owners: Duke Energy; American Electric Power; Dayton Power & Light
- Operator: Duke Energy

Thermal power station
- Primary fuel: Coal; Oil
- Cooling source: Ohio River

Power generation
- Nameplate capacity: 1,433 MW

The Walter C. Beckjord Generating Station was a 1.43-gigawatt (1,433 MW), dual-fuel power generating station located near New Richmond, Ohio, 22 miles east of Cincinnati, Ohio. The plant began operation in 1952 and was decommissioned in 2014. It was jointly owned by Duke Energy, American Electric Power (AEP), and Dayton Power & Light (DP&L).

== Background ==
Of the two Beckjord power plants, one was coal-fired (Units 1–6) and the other was oil-fired (Units GT1–GT4). It was originally built by Cincinnati Gas & Electric Company (CG&E), which was bought by Duke Energy in 2006. The plant is named after Walter C. Beckjord, the chairman of CG&E from 1957 to 1962. CG&E installed new electrostatic precipitators at Beckjord in the 1970s to reduce pollution mandated by the State of Ohio.

W. C. Beckjord Power Station
Unit	Nameplate capacity, MW	Initial year of operation	Retired
Coal-Fired Unit 1	115.0	1952	2012
Coal-Fired Unit 2	112.5	1953	2013
Coal-Fired Unit 3	125.0	1954	2013
Coal-Fired Unit 4	163.2	1958	2014
Coal-Fired Unit 5	244.8	1962	2014
Coal-Fired Unit 6	460.8	1969	2014
Coal-Fired Total	1,221.3	–	–
Oil-Fired Units GT1–GT4	52.9 (each)	1972	2014
Oil-Fired Total	211.6	–	–
Facility Total	1,433	–	–

== Closure and decommissioning ==
In July 2011, Duke Energy announced that Beckjord would shut down in January 2015 because of tightening environmental regulations from the Environmental Protection Agency (EPA) outweighed the benefits of retrofitting the plant. The shut down was accelerated to November 2014 after an open valve caused an oil spill into the Ohio River the previous August. Duke Energy pleaded guilty in federal court in 2016 for spilling 9,000 gallons of diesel fuel into the Ohio River. The company was fined $1 million for the spill.

In 2015, Duke Energy installed a battery-based energy storage system at the site for the purpose of regulating frequency in the electric grid. As a part of the decommissioning process, Duke Energy terminated their lease with the New Richmond Soccer Association who played soccer matches adjacent to Beckjord.

Duke Energy and its co-owners, AEP and DP&L, agreed to sell Beckjord and adjacent lands to Commercial Liability Partners for an undisclosed amount in February 2018. Commercial Liability Partners intends to repurpose the brownfields for redevelopment.

In April 2023, local officials raised alarms after nearly 300 acres of the site, nearly one third, was purchased by a neighboring farmer.

== See also ==
- List of power stations in Ohio
