= Hanging Rock Energy Facility =

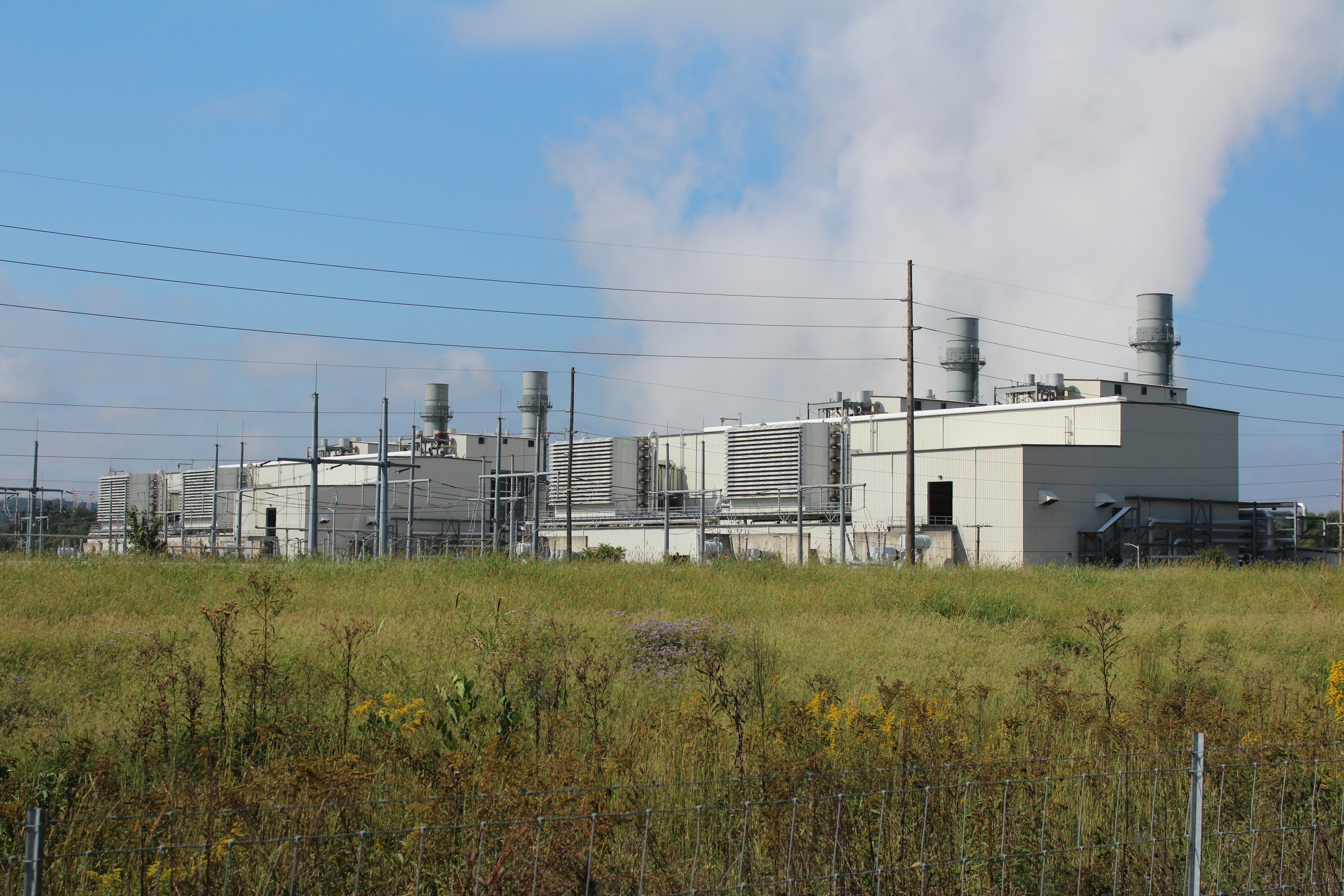
- Hanging Rock Energy Facility in 2018
- Country: United States
- Location: Hamilton Township in Lawrence County, near Hanging Rock, Ohio
- Coordinates: 38°34′23″N 82°47′2″W
- Status: Operational
- Commission date: Units 1–6: 2003
- Owner: Dynegy
- Operator: Dynegy

Thermal power station
- Primary fuel: Natural gas
- Combined cycle?: Yes

Power generation
- Nameplate capacity: 1,430 MW

The Hanging Rock Energy Facility is a 1.43-gigawatt (1,430 MW), natural gas power plant located west of Hanging Rock, Ohio in Lawrence County, Ohio. The plant began operations in 2003 and is currently owned by Vistra Energy.

== History ==
Construction of Hanging Rock began in 2001. Duke/Fluor Daniel was contracted to construct it. Commercial generation of Hanging Rock commenced in 2003 with an initial capacity of 1,240 MW. The construction costs for the plant totaled $502 million. In 2014, Duke Energy sold Hanging Rock to Dynegy. Following its acquisition, Dynegy would upgrade the combustion turbines at the facility, thereby giving the plant its current generating capacity.

== Equipment ==
Hanging Rock features four, General Electric, 7FA gas turbine generators that operate in combined cycle with two, General Electric, D11 steam turbine generators. Its natural gas is delivered via a branch of the Texas Eastern Transmission Pipeline. The plant connects to a nearby substation, operated by American Electric Power (AEP).

== See also ==
- List of power stations in Ohio
