= Oregon Clean Energy Center =

Natural gas power station in Oregon, Ohio, USA

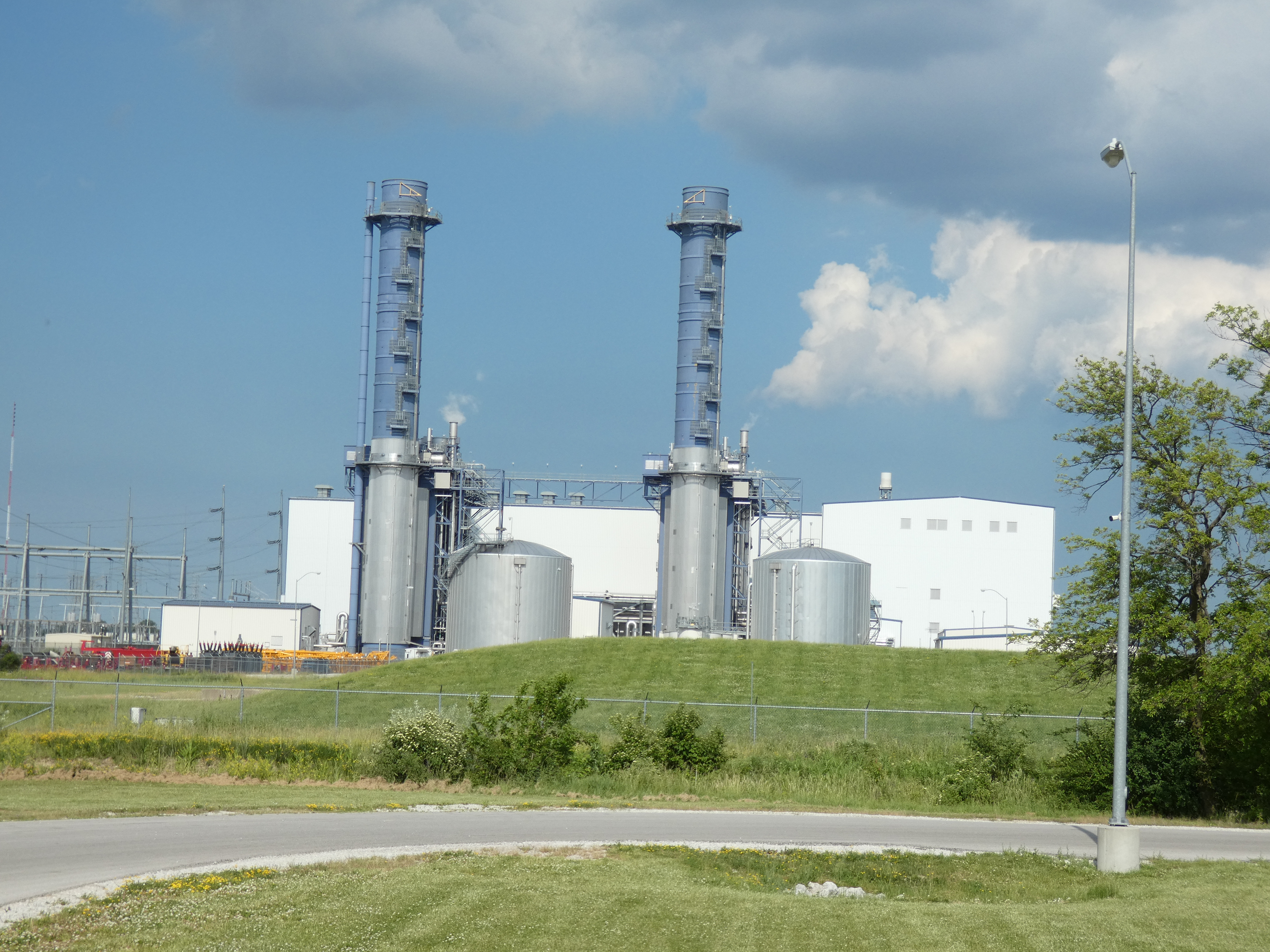
- Oregon Clean Energy Center Plant in 2022
- Country: United States
- Coordinates: 41.6668°N 83.4483°W
- Owner: Ares Management
- Combined cycle?: Yes

Power generation
- Nameplate capacity: 1,061.5 MW

The Oregon Clean Energy Center (OCEC) is a combined-cycle natural gas-fired generation facility located in Oregon, Ohio. The facility has the capability to generate 960 net megawatts of capacity and can produce electricity for more than 700,000 homes. It was developed and financed in direct response to the robust wholesale price signal provided by PJM Interconnections's capacity and energy markets.

The OCEC uses two Siemens SGT6-8000H gas turbines and one steam turbine, currently the most advanced on the market. Designed to be the most efficient generating facility in the mid-Atlantic power markets, OCEC emits 90% less sulfur dioxide, nitrogen oxide, mercury and fine particulate matter than coal-fired power plants; as well as 50% less carbon dioxide and 33% less water than traditional coal plants of the same size.

== Development ==
In April 2012, CME Energy LLC partnered with Pure Energy to form the development company, North America Project Development, LLC (NAPD), in order to build the OCEC. CME Energy and NAPD then partnered with global asset manager Ares Management, L.P.'s energy-focused private equity arm, Ares Energy Investment Funds (EIF), as the project's initial equity provider. Later, independent global infrastructure investment manager I Squared Capital joined as a co-investor and owner in the project. The project reached financial close on November 14, 2014.

On November 17, 2014, Ares EIF and I Squared Capital announced that the two companies had formed an equity partnership to construct the OCEC. Their investment totaled $800 million, with each firm investing $400 million. Ares EIF engaged in the project specifically through one of its private equity funds, EIF United States Power Fun IV, L.P. (USPF IV), and I Squared Capital engaged through its ISQ Global Infrastructure Fund.

CME, through NAPD, remains a minority-owner of the plant today.

== Construction ==
Following the plant's approval from the Ohio Power Sitting Board in May 2013, Black & Veatch, a global engineering, construction, procurement and consulting firm, began construction of the OCEC on November 17, 2014. The plant was built with over 25,000 cubic yards of concrete and over 3,700 tons of structural steel.

At its peak period in the spring of 2016, construction of the project supported more than 900 on-site jobs. Additionally, construction of the OCED created approximately 450 indirect jobs in Lucas County and approximately 350 indirect jobs across Ohio.

Construction of the plant was completed in June 2017, and it officially opened in August 2017. The opening was celebrated with a ribbon-cutting ceremony at which Ohio governor John Kasich, accompanied by several state and local officials, toured the plant and spoke about the significance of this development for Ohio.

== Economic impact ==
The facility's construction and its first 20 years of operations are projected to contribute more than $800 million to Ohio, Lucas County and the City of Oregon's economy. The total economic impact of the facility's construction in Lucas County is $362 million, with an additional economic impact of $50 million across the state.

Additionally, approximately 50 permanent jobs will be created by the OCEC's operation, which will provide an additional $20 million of economic impact in Ohio.

Oregon local schools are also projected to receive millions of dollars in new tax revenues from the OCEC's operations. The region has already realized improvements to local infrastructure, including water system upgrades and installation of natural gas pipelines.

== Recognition and awards ==
The OCEC won IJGlobal's North American Single-Asset Power 2014 Award in March 2015.
