= Conesville Power Plant =

Coal power plant in Coshocton County, Ohio

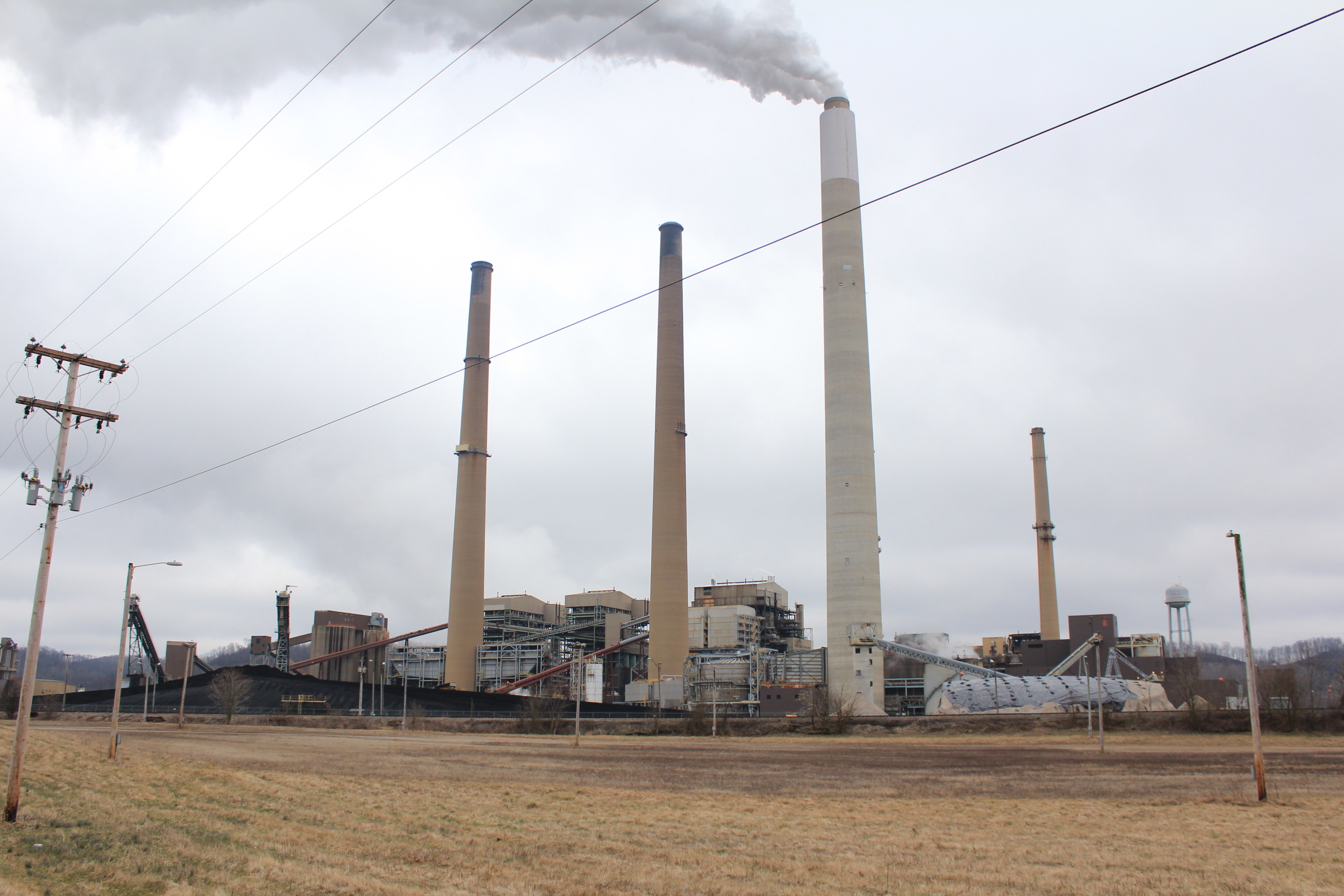
- Conesville Power Plant in 2020
- Country: United States
- Location: Franklin Township, Coshocton County, near Conesville, Ohio
- Coordinates: 40°11′10″N 81°52′43″W
- Status: Decommissioned
- Commission date: Unit 1: 1957; Unit 2: 1959; Unit 3: 1962; Unit 4: 1973; Unit 5: 1976; Unit 6: 1978
- Decommission date: Unit 1–2: 2005; Unit 3: 2012; Units 5–6: May 31, 2019; Unit 4: April 29, 2020
- Owners: AEP Generation Resources; AES Ohio Generation
- Operator: American Electric Power (AEP)

Thermal power station
- Primary fuel: Coal
- Cooling source: Muskingum River

Power generation
- Nameplate capacity: 2,005 MW

External links
- Commons: Related media on Commons

Conesville Power Plant was a 2-gigwatt (2,005 MW), coal power plant located east of Conesville, Ohio in Coshocton County, Ohio. Its units were co-owned at the time of its closing by American Electric Power (AEP) and AES Ohio Generation. All plant operations were handled by AEP. Conesville began operations in 1957 and ceased generation in April 2020.

== History ==
Construction of Unit 1 began in 1955 and was commissioned by Columbus & Southern Ohio Electric (a forerunner of AEP). Unit 1 began commercial generation in 1957 while Unit 2 began operations two years later in 1959. Both units cost $36 million to construct and generated 125 MW each. Unit 3 began operations in 1962 with a generation capacity of 165 MW. Unit 4 began operations in 1973 with a generation capacity of 780 MW. At the time of its conception, the unit would be jointly owned by Cincinnati Gas and Electric (CG&E) (a forerunner of Duke Energy), Columbus & Southern Ohio Electric, and DP&L. Units 5 and 6 began operations in 1976 and 1978 respectively. Over the years, Units 5 and 6 have increased electrical generation from 375 MW to 405 MW. In 2014, Duke Energy sold its stake in Conesville to Dynegy. Three years later in 2017, Dynegy sold its stake in Conesville in a swap with AEP for a stake of William H. Zimmer Power Station. At the time of its closure in 2020, DP&L held a minority ownership of Unit 4 with AEP.

== Environmental mitigation ==
With the installation of Unit 4, electrostatic precipitators (ESPs) were installed to prevent fly ash from going into the atmosphere. ESPs were later installed to Units 1–3 in the mid-1970s. Unit 4 also had cooling towers constructed which resulted in zero discharge into the Muskingum River. In 2009, Unit 4 would receive the installation of flue-gas desulfurization (FGD) equipment along with a selective catalytic reduction (SCR) system to meet the requirements of the Environmental Protection Agency's (EPA) Clean Air Interstate Rule (CAIR) and Clean Air Mercury Rule (CAMR). The $450 million project for Unit 4, saw the construction of an 800 ft (240 m) smokestack for the FGD equipment. After it was installed, inspectors found corrosion. AEP settled with Black & Veatch, the contractor who installed the FGD equipment, to address the corrosion. When Units 5 and 6 went into operation, $52 million in scrubber technology were installed to reduce sulfur dioxide (SO_{2}) emissions, but it operated inefficiently. The scrubber was eventually upgraded in 2008. In the summer of 2001, Unit 6 was the test site for Thermal Energy International's THERMALONOx. The THERMALONOx was intended to show that nitrogen oxide (NO_{x}) emissions would be reduced by 70%. Unfortunately, the demonstration was halted in September 2001 after the "system did not appreciably reduce nitrogen oxide (NO_{x}) emission levels."

== Operations ==
When the first unit went into operation, it was projected that Conesville would use between 300,000 and 400,000 short tons of coal each year. According to the Energy Information Administration (EIA), the plant received 1,716,286 short tons of coal in 2017. All of the coal was shipped from mines within Ohio. Conesville used to employ 600 workers. In 2018, only 165 were employed at the plant.

== Retirement ==
Units 1 and 2 were retired in 2005 after Unit 1's tubing to its boiler failed. Inspections on Unit 2 revealed severe corrosion in a pattern that was similar to Unit 1. The reported cost of $35 million to repair both units was not worth the benefit of returning to service. Unit 3 was retired in December 2012 in order to comply with the Environmental Protect Agency (EPA) rules regarding mercury, lead, and other toxic emissions. AEP announced in October 2018 they will shut down Conesville by May 2020. Units 5 and 6 retired on May 31, 2019, while Unit 4 remained in operation until April 2020. The decision to close the plant was due to operational costs, not clearing PJM Interconnection's capacity auction, and AEP unable to find a buyer. The facility was imploded on December 19, 2021.

== Incidents ==
In February 1982, two protestors from Greenpeace climbed up one of Conesville Power Plant's smokestacks to protest against acid rain. The protestors spent three days on top of the smokestack. They were charged with criminal trespass. The judge fined both protestors $250 and were sentenced to three days in jail.

In July 2004, a tank exploded burning two workers. They would later die from their injuries. AEP determined the cause was due to a sudden release of molten slag that overpressured the tank.

== See also ==
- List of power stations in Ohio
