= Brilliant High School =

Coordinates: 40°15′47″N 80°37′53″W

Brilliant High School was a public high school in Brilliant, Ohio, United States. Established in the 1880s, the school was home to the Brilliant Blue Devils athletic teams. In 1972, the school merged with nearby Smithfield High School to form Buckeye North High School.

In 1990, Buckeye North High School would merge with Buckeye South and Buckeye West high schools to create the current Buckeye Local High School.
