= Lockbourne, Ohio =

- Village
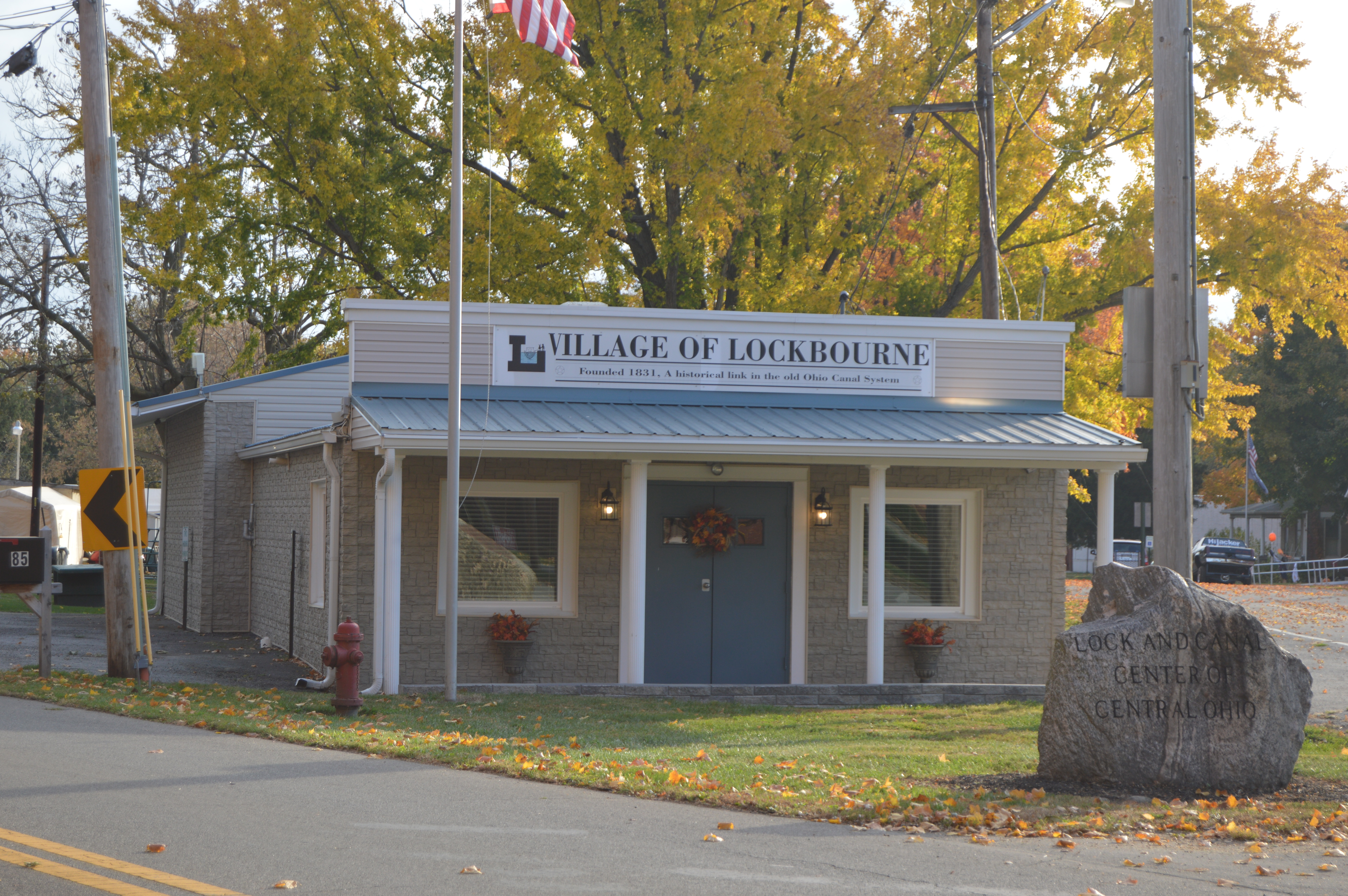
- Village hall

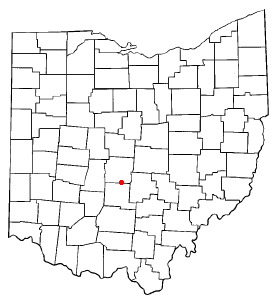
- Location of Lockbourne, Ohio

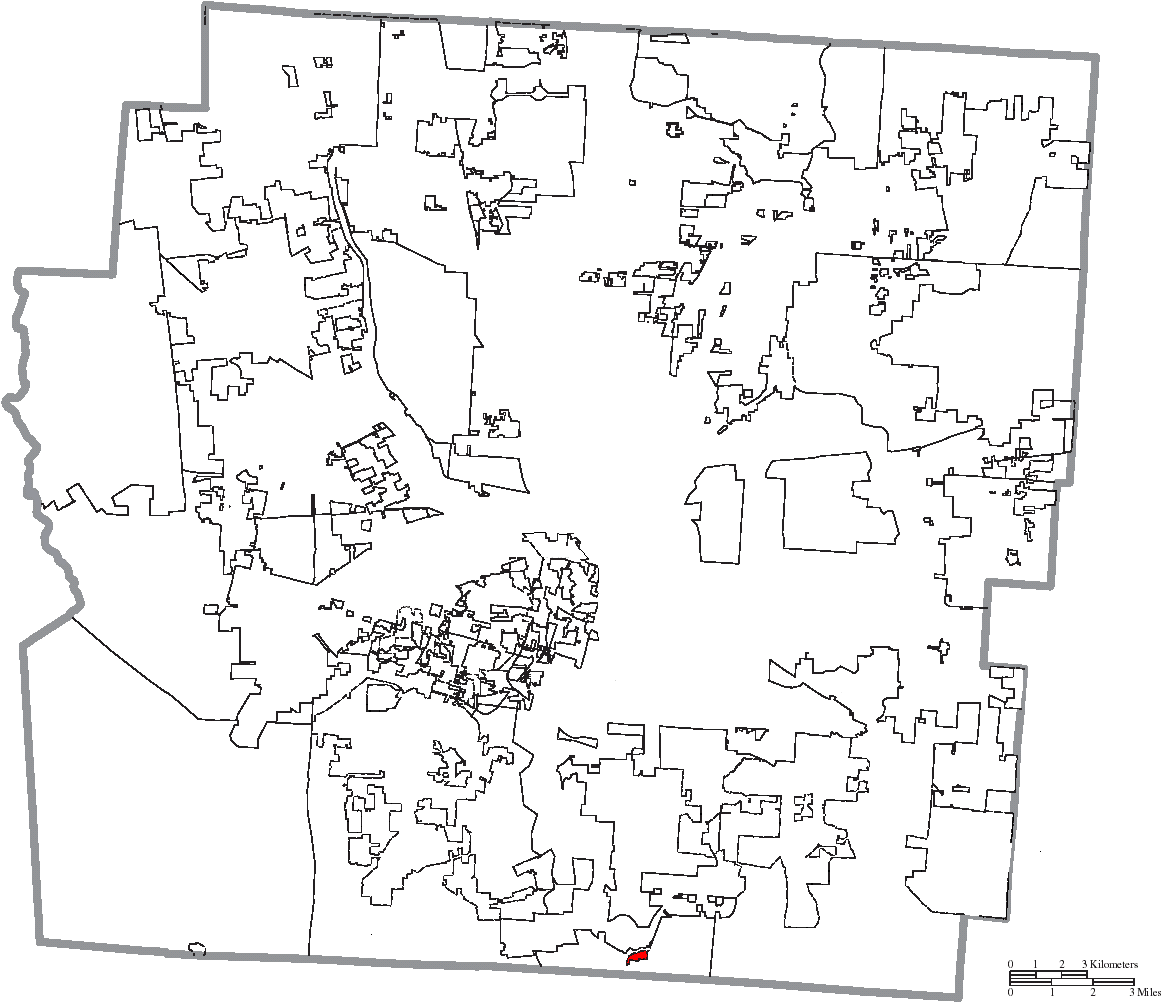
- Location of Lockbourne in Franklin County
- Coordinates: 39°48′28″N 82°59′01″W
- Country: United States
- State123⁴5 asd113: Ohio
- County: Franklin, Pickaway County

Area
  - Total: 0.84 sq mi (2.17 km^{2})
  - Land: 0.78 sq mi (2.03 km^{2})
  - Water: 0.054 sq mi (0.14 km^{2})
- Elevation: 689 ft (210 m)

Population (2020)
  - Total: 236
  - Density: 300.7/sq mi (116.09/km^{2})
- Time zone: UTC-5 (Eastern (EST))
  - Summer (DST): UTC-4 (EDT)
- ZIP code: 43137
- Area code: 614
- FIPS code: 39-44310
- GNIS feature ID: 2398462
- Website: www.lockbourneohio.us

Lockbourne is a village in Franklin County and Pickaway County, Ohio, United States. The population was 236 at the 2020 census. Lockbourne is located near Rickenbacker International Airport and was the source of its original name: Lockbourne Air Force Base.

== History ==
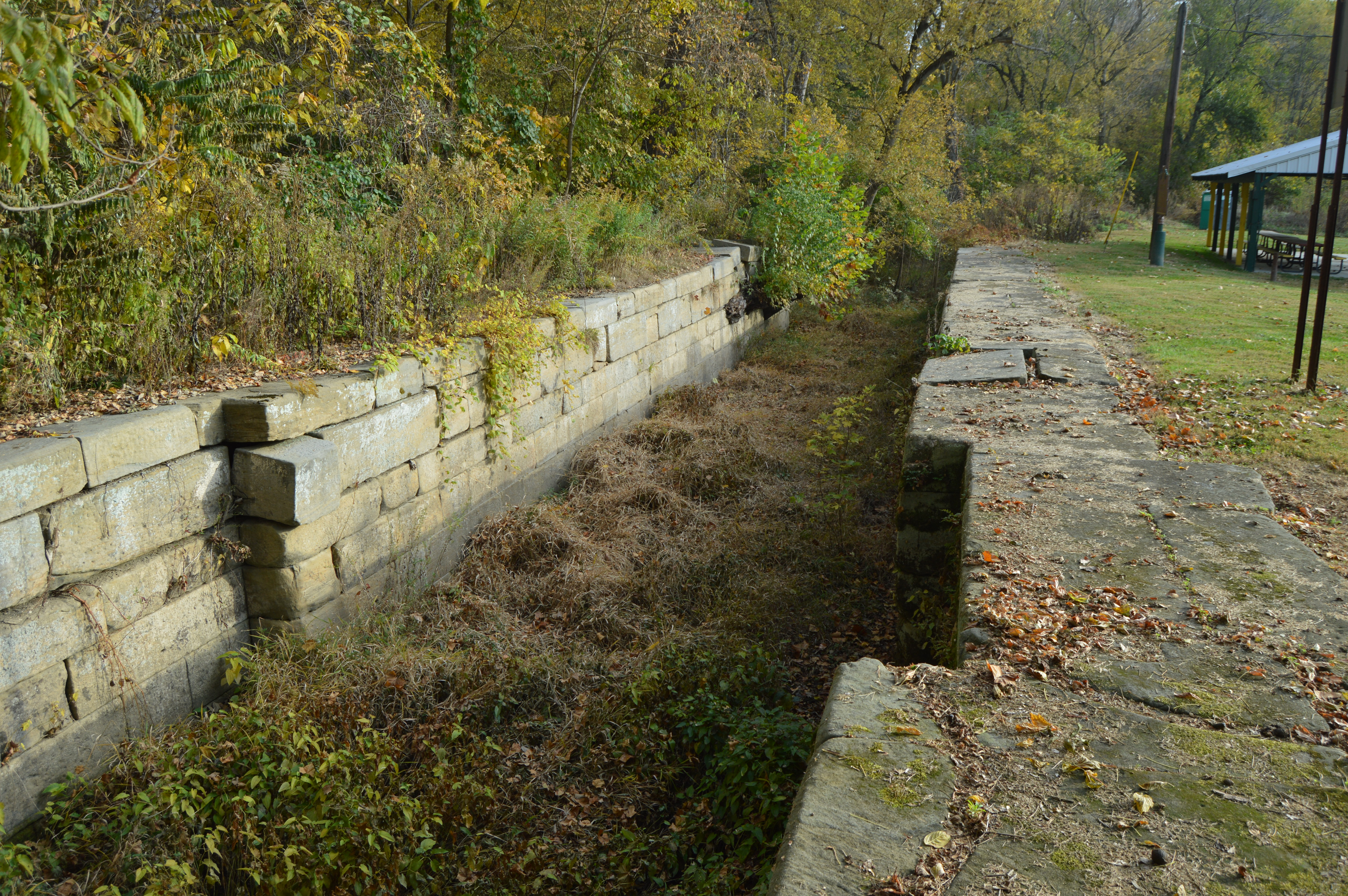
Ohio and Erie Canal namesake site in Lock Meadows Park

Lockbourne was laid out in the early 1830s. It takes its name from the locks of the Ohio and Erie Canal, on which it was situated.

Picway Power Plant, a coal-fired power plant, operated in Lockbourne from 1926 to 2015. It was owned by Columbus & Southern Ohio Electric, and later by American Electric Power (AEP).

== Geography ==
According to the United States Census Bureau, the village has a total area of 0.80 square miles (2.07 km^{2}), of which, 0.75 square miles (1.94 km^{2}) is land and 0.05 square miles (0.13 km^{2}) is water.

== Demographics ==
Historical population
Census	Pop.	Note	%±
1840	139		—
1850	218		56.8%
1860	205		−6.0%
1870	281		37.1%
1880	285		1.4%
1910	307		—
1920	279		−9.1%
1930	299		7.2%
1940	372		24.4%
1950	376		1.1%
1960	460		22.3%
1970	420		−8.7%
1980	373		−11.2%
1990	173		−53.6%
2000	280		61.8%
2010	237		−15.4%
2020	236		−0.4%
U.S. Decennial Census 2020

=== 2010 census ===
At the 2010 census there were 237 people, 95 households, and 69 families living in the village. The population density was 316.0 inhabitants per square mile (122.0/km^{2}). There were 108 housing units at an average density of 144.0 per square mile (55.6/km^{2}). The racial makeup of the village was 97.9% White, 0.4% from other races, and 1.7% from two or more races. Hispanic or Latino people of any race were 2.5%.

Of the 95 households 33.7% had children under the age of 18 living with them, 54.7% were married couples living together, 12.6% had a female householder with no husband present, 5.3% had a male householder with no wife present, and 27.4% were non-families. 21.1% of households were one person and 8.5% were one person aged 65 or older. The average household size was 2.49 and the average family size was 2.86.

The median age in the village was 38.9 years. 24.5% of residents were under the age of 18; 8% were between the ages of 18 and 24; 26.6% were from 25 to 44; 20.2% were from 45 to 64; and 20.7% were 65 or older. The gender makeup of the village was 47.7% male and 52.3% female.

=== 2000 census ===
At the 2000 census there were 280 people, 107 households, and 78 families living in the village. The population density was 2,950.5 inhabitants per square mile (1,139.2/km^{2}). There were 114 housing units at an average density of 1,201.3 per square mile (463.8/km^{2}). The racial makeup of the village was 99.64% White, and 0.36% from two or more races. Hispanic or Latino people of any race were 0.36%.

Of the 107 households 26.2% had children under the age of 18 living with them, 56.1% were married couples living together, 8.4% had a female householder with no husband present, and 26.2% were non-families. 23.4% of households were one person and 12.1% were one person aged 65 or older. The average household size was 2.62 and the average family size was 3.05.

The age distribution was 25.4% under the age of 18, 5.7% from 18 to 24, 27.5% from 25 to 44, 25.7% from 45 to 64, and 15.7% 65 or older. The median age was 39 years. For every 100 females there were 105.9 males. For every 100 females age 18 and over, there were 97.2 males.

The median household income was $33,929 and the median family income was $38,125. Males had a median income of $26,875 versus $25,500 for females. The per capita income for the village was $14,802. About 5.1% of families and 9.5% of the population were below the poverty line, including 9.1% of those under the age of eighteen and 6.1% of those sixty five or over.

== Transportation and infrastructure ==
While Rickenbacker Airport is extremely close to Lockbourne, very few commercial flights land or take off at Rickenbacker, and many Columbus-area commercial flights are scheduled at John Glenn International Airport. Many smaller general aviation airports are also located close to Lockbourne, the closest of which is Bolton Field.

Road access to Lockbourne primarily revolves around U.S. Route 23 and Ohio State Route 317. The closest controlled-access highway is Interstate 270, a ring road connecting outer Columbus suburbs as well as Interstate 70 and Interstate 71.
