= Sidney Waterworks and Electric Light Building =

- U.S. National Register of Historic Places
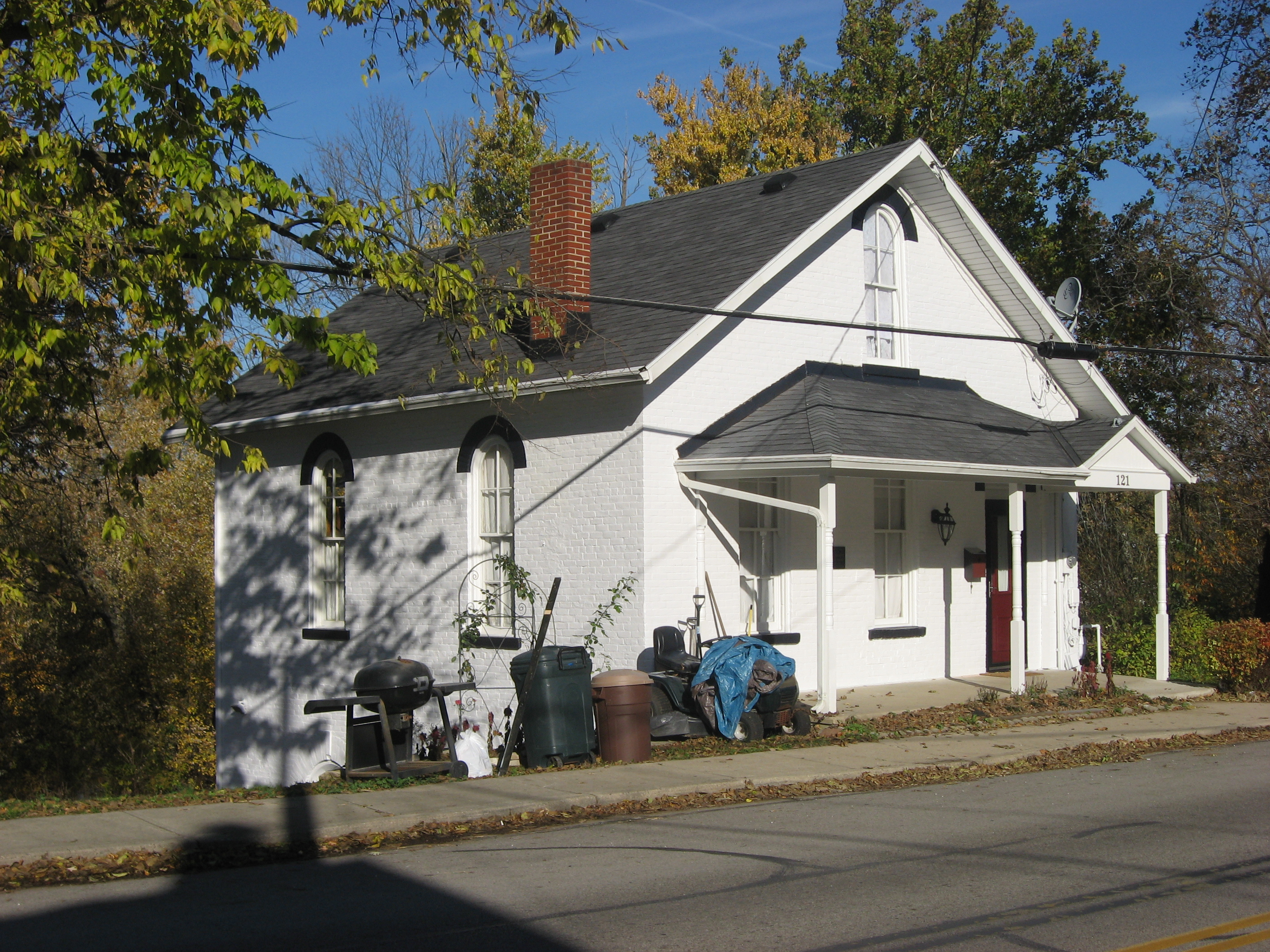
- Front and southern side of the building

- Location within Ohio Location within the United States
- Location: 121 N. Brooklyn Ave., Sidney, Ohio
- Coordinates: 40°17′12″N 84°8′54″W
- Area: less than one acre
- Built: 1873
- NRHP reference No.: 78002190
- Added to NRHP: December 29, 1978

The Sidney Waterworks and Electric Light Building is a historic structure on the east side of Sidney, Ohio, United States. Erected in 1873, the building is a former waterworks and power plant for the city. This four-story brick building is the third-oldest waterworks in southwestern Ohio, preceded only by those in Cincinnati and Dayton. After nearly thirty years of operation, the building was converted into a hydroelectric power plant: instead of pumping water to the city's residents, the building's machinery was used to operate a water wheel for the generation of electricity.

Built on a limestone foundation, the building's four floors have always been used for distinct purposes. While the building's machinery was located on the lower two floors, the upper two floors were used for residential purposes.

In 1978, the Sidney Waterworks and Electric Light Building was listed on the National Register of Historic Places because of its historical and architectural significance. As an early utility plant, the building is important in statewide history, and it is architecturally notable because of its western facade, which faces the Great Miami River. Today, the entire structure is used as a house.
