= Brilliant, Ohio =

- Census-designated place
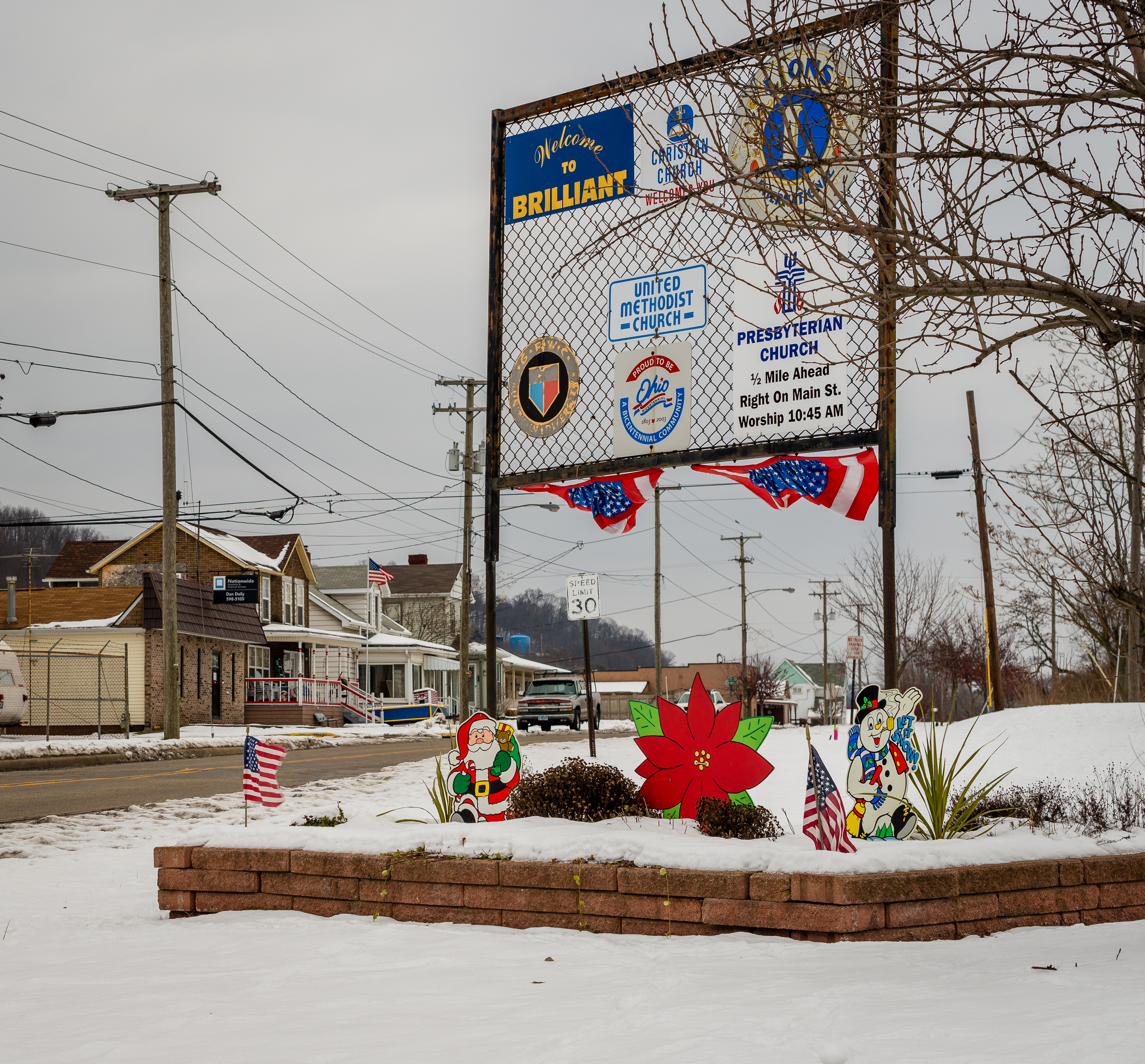
- Brilliant's welcome sign

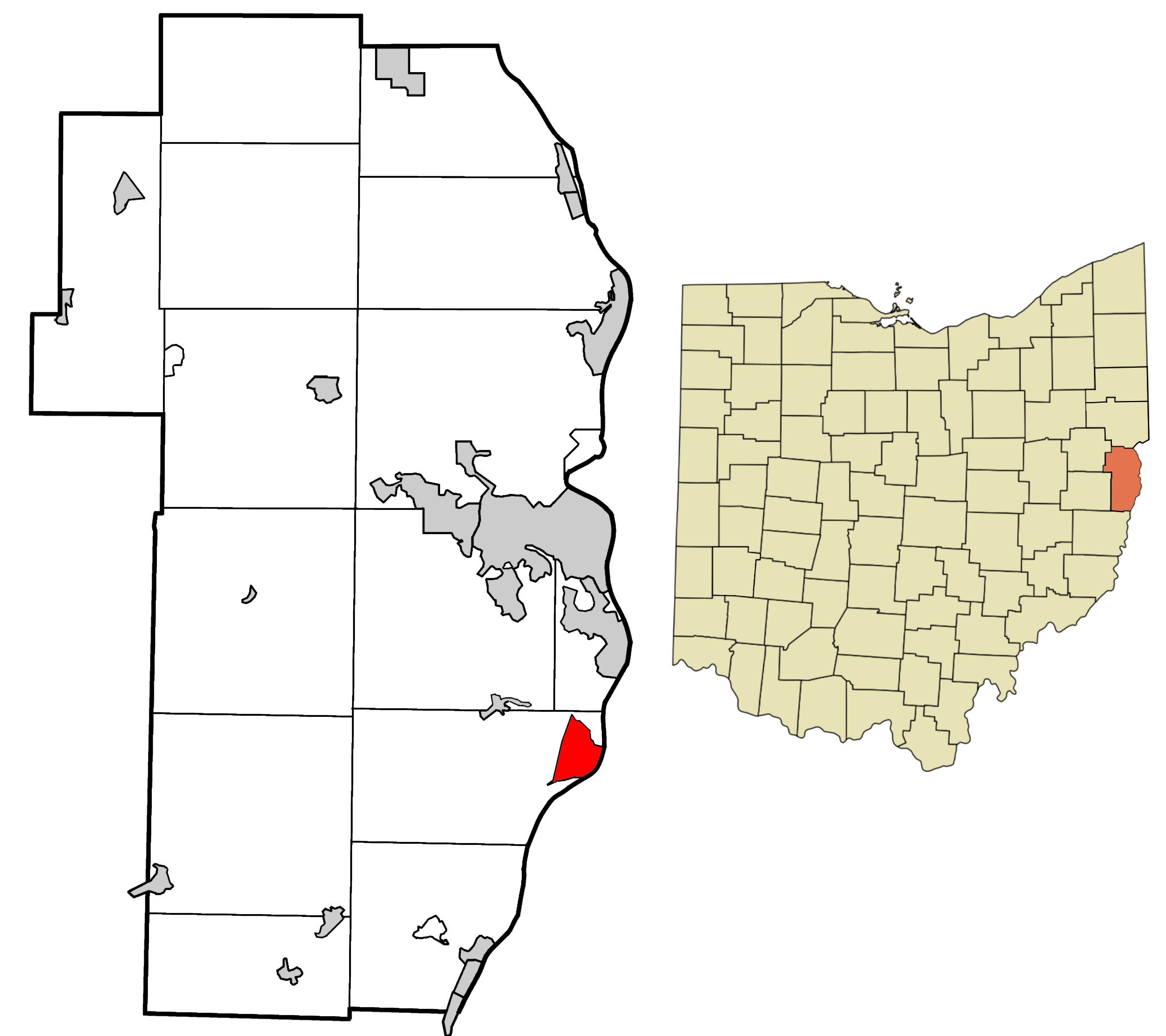
- Location of Brilliant in Jefferson County and in the state of Ohio
- Coordinates: 40°16′12″N 80°37′35″W
- Country: United States
- State: Ohio
- County: Jefferson
- Township: Wells

Area
  - Total: 1.76 sq mi (4.56 km^{2})
  - Land: 1.75 sq mi (4.52 km^{2})
  - Water: 0.015 sq mi (0.04 km^{2})
- Elevation: 919 ft (280 m)

Population (2020)
  - Total: 1,317
  - Density: 754.0/sq mi (291.14/km^{2})
- Time zone: UTC-5 (Eastern (EST))
  - Summer (DST): UTC-4 (EDT)
- ZIP code: 43913
- Area code: 740
- FIPS code: 39-08812
- GNIS Feature ID: 2393349

Brilliant is an unincorporated community and census-designated place (CDP) in eastern Jefferson County, Ohio, United States, along the Ohio River. It was named after the Brilliant Glass factory that once was located in the town. The population was 1,317 as of the 2020 census. It is part of the Weirton–Steubenville metropolitan area.

Brilliant was formerly incorporated as a village, but it disincorporated on November 24, 1993.

== History ==
Brilliant was laid out in 1819 by western Virginia statesman Philip Doddridge under the name "Philipsburgh". The location was considered significant to commerce as it was the convergence of many roads in close proximity to the Ohio River and parallel to the Wellsburg wharf. A new addition was laid out in 1836 named "La Grange", a name also adopted by the railway station in 1856. In 1880, the Brilliant Glass Company was established and a glass factory was built at La Grange. The town later adopted the name of the glass company and was incorporated as "Brilliant", changing the titles of the railway station and post office.

The Cardinal Power Plant is located south of Brilliant. It commenced operations in 1967.

== Geography ==
Brilliant is in northeastern Wells Township, along the Ohio River 7 miles (11 km) south of Steubenville. Ohio State Route 7, a four-lane freeway, passes through the southeast side of the community, leading north (upriver) to Steubenville and south 16 miles (26 km) to Bridgeport, across the river from Wheeling, West Virginia.

According to the 2010 census, the Brilliant CDP has a total area of 1.77 square miles (4.58 km^{2}), of which 1.75 square miles (4.53 km^{2}) (or 98.87%) are land and 0.01 square miles (0.03 km^{2}) (or 0.56%) are water.

=== Climate ===
The climate in this area is characterized by relatively high temperatures and evenly distributed precipitation throughout the year. According to the Köppen Climate Classification system, Brilliant has a Humid subtropical climate, abbreviated "Cfa" on climate maps.

Climate data for Brilliant, Ohio
Month	Jan	Feb	Mar	Apr	May	Jun	Jul	Aug	Sep	Oct	Nov	Dec	Year
Mean daily maximum °C (°F)	3 (37)	4 (39)	10 (50)	17 (62)	23 (73)	27 (80)	29 (84)	28 (82)	25 (77)	18 (64)	11 (51)	5 (41)	16 (60)
Mean daily minimum °C (°F)	−6 (21)	−5 (23)	−1 (30)	3 (37)	8 (46)	13 (55)	15 (59)	14 (57)	11 (51)	5 (41)	0 (32)	−4 (24)	4 (39)
Average precipitation mm (inches)	74 (2.9)	61 (2.4)	86 (3.4)	86 (3.4)	99 (3.9)	110 (4.2)	110 (4.4)	94 (3.7)	79 (3.1)	69 (2.7)	69 (2.7)	71 (2.8)	1,000 (39.5)
Source: Weatherbase

== Demographics ==
Historical population
Census	Pop.	Note	%±
2010	1,482		—
2020	1,317		−11.1%
U.S. Decennial Census

== Education ==
Public education in the community of Brilliant is provided by the Buckeye Local School District. Public high school students in the city attend Buckeye Local High School; Brilliant High School formerly served as the high school in the city.

Brilliant has a public library, which is a branch of the Public Library of Steubenville and Jefferson County.
