= Conesville, Ohio =

- Village
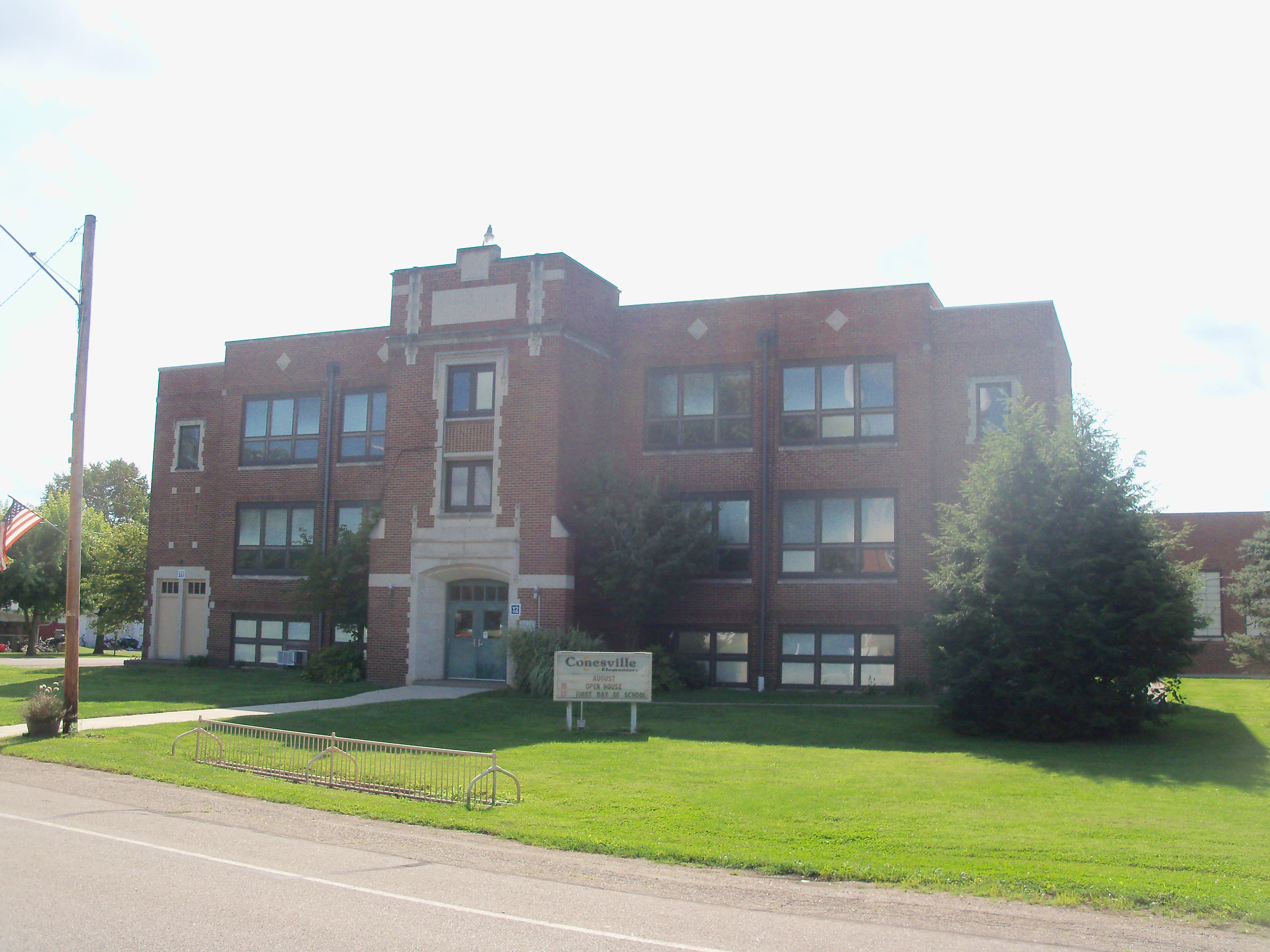
- Conesville Elementary School

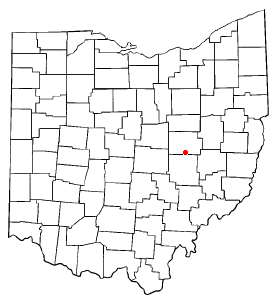
- Location of Conesville, Ohio

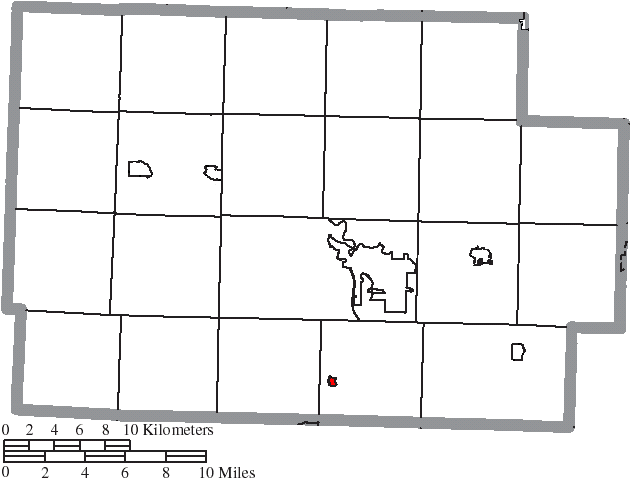
- Location of Conesville in Coshocton County
- Coordinates: 40°11′06″N 81°53′31″W
- Country: United States
- State: Ohio
- County: Coshocton
- Township: Franklin

Area
  - Total: 0.14 sq mi (0.36 km^{2})
  - Land: 0.14 sq mi (0.36 km^{2})
  - Water: 0 sq mi (0.00 km^{2})
- Elevation: 742 ft (226 m)

Population (2020)
  - Total: 328
  - Estimate (2023): 326
  - Density: 2,357.4/sq mi (910.21/km^{2})
- Time zone: UTC-5 (Eastern (EST))
  - Summer (DST): UTC-4 (EDT)
- ZIP code: 43811
- Area code: 740
- FIPS code: 39-18266
- GNIS feature ID: 2398614

Conesville is a village in Coshocton County, Ohio, United States, along the Muskingum River. The population was 328 at the 2020 census.

== History ==
Conesville is most likely named after Beebe Stewart Cone, who in 1847, with three other men, erected a sizable distillery near the west side of the Muskingum River. A group of houses for workers was built near the distillery, accompanied by several small businesses. The distillery burned down in 1857. Afterward, Cone gave up that business venture and moved on to Muscatine County, Iowa. The distillery was rebuilt by a man named James Beebe, but it also burned down a few years later. Prior to 1840, a man named Delaney purchased land in the same area and planned for it to be named Delaneysville, but it failed as an incorporated entity.

The Conesville Power Plant, located just east of the village, started operations in 1957. It ceased operations in 2020 and was demolished in 2021.

== Geography ==
According to the United States Census Bureau, the village has a total area of 0.16 square miles (0.41 km^{2}), all land.

== Demographics ==
Historical population
Census	Pop.	Note	%±
1950	466		—
1960	451		−3.2%
1970	448		−0.7%
1980	451		0.7%
1990	420		−6.9%
2000	364		−13.3%
2010	347		−4.7%
2020	328		−5.5%
2023 (est.)	326	▼	−0.6%
U.S. Decennial Census

=== 2010 census ===
As of the census of 2010, there were 347 people, 134 households, and 98 families living in the village. The population density was 2,168.8 inhabitants per square mile (837.4/km^{2}). There were 146 housing units at an average density of 912.5 per square mile (352.3/km^{2}). The racial makeup of the village was 100.0% White.

There were 134 households, of which 32.8% had children under the age of 18 living with them, 57.5% were married couples living together, 12.7% had a female householder with no husband present, 3.0% had a male householder with no wife present, and 26.9% were non-families. 21.6% of all households were made up of individuals, and 13.4% had someone living alone who was 65 years of age or older. The average household size was 2.59 and the average family size was 2.98.

The median age in the village was 37.5 years. 25.6% of residents were under the age of 18; 6% were between the ages of 18 and 24; 28.2% were from 25 to 44; 22.2% were from 45 to 64; and 17.9% were 65 years of age or older. The gender makeup of the village was 46.7% male and 53.3% female.

=== 2000 census ===
As of the census of 2000, there were 364 people, 144 households, and 105 families living in the village. The population density was 2,387.4 inhabitants per square mile (921.8/km^{2}). There were 149 housing units at an average density of 977.3 per square mile (377.3/km^{2}). The racial makeup of the village was 99.73% White, and 0.27% from two or more races. Hispanic or Latino of any race were 0.82% of the population.

There were 144 households, out of which 32.6% had children under the age of 18 living with them, 57.6% were married couples living together, 13.2% had a female householder with no husband present, and 26.4% were non-families. 24.3% of all households were made up of individuals, and 12.5% had someone living alone who was 65 years of age or older. The average household size was 2.53 and the average family size was 2.95.

In the village, the population was spread out, with 25.8% under the age of 18, 9.9% from 18 to 24, 26.6% from 25 to 44, 25.0% from 45 to 64, and 12.6% who were 65 years of age or older. The median age was 35 years. For every 100 females there were 96.8 males. For every 100 females age 18 and over, there were 92.9 males.

The median income for a household in the village was $35,139, and the median income for a family was $46,563. Males had a median income of $29,444 versus $22,750 for females. The per capita income for the village was $18,015. About 6.7% of families and 10.0% of the population were below the poverty line, including 16.2% of those under age 18 and 12.1% of those age 65 or over.
