= LO-NOx burner =

One of John Joyce's early sketches of the Low NOx burner

A LO NO_{x} burner is a type of burner that is typically used in utility boilers to produce steam and electricity.

== Background ==
John Joyce the inventor of the LO-NO_{x} burner at Australian Gas Association Conference in the early 1990s

=== The first discovery ===
Around 1986 John Joyce (of Bowin Cars fame), an influential Australian inventor, first learned about oxides of nitrogen (NO_{x}) and their role in the production of smog and acid rain. His first introduction to the complexities of the subject was brought about by the work of Fred Barnes and Dr John Bromley from the state Energy Commission of Western Australia.

The vast majority of the research and development stretching back over twenty years was about large scale industrial burners and complex mechanisms which, in the end, did not produce what one would consider low NO_{x} (2 ng/J or ~ 4 ppm at 0% O_{2} on dry basis).

In fact at that time, 15 ng/J NO_{2} appears to have been considered low NO_{2}. The one clear message that did flow through all the mass of information he studied, was the effect of temperature on the formation of NO_{x}.

=== "Need is the Mother of Invention" ===
In the late 1980s, Health and Environment Authorities in Australia raised concerns about the indoor air quality and the extent that particularly older style unflued gas heaters were contributing to higher than acceptable levels of nitrogen dioxide (NO_{2}). Consequently in 1989 the New South Wales Department of School Education initiated an extensive investigation of nitrogen dioxide in schools throughout New South Wales. As an interim measure the Health Authorities advised that a level of 0.3 ppm NO_{2} should become the upper limit for classrooms. The Australian Gas Association in turn reduced the indoor emission rate of NO_{2} for unflued gas heaters from 15 to 5 ng/J and this remains the current limit. The New South Wales government, through the Public Works Department, also re-evaluated alternative methods of heating classrooms, to ensure a safe and healthy environment for students.

It was in this context, that John Joyce's company Bowin Technology embarked on a major research & development program aimed at minimising nitrogen dioxide emissions from unflued gas heaters. Bowin Technology set itself the task of solving the emission problem at its source: the gas burner. This was despite a generally long held belief by gas experts, that commercially warranted gas burner improvements could not deliver drastic nitrogen oxides (NO_{x}) reductions.

In 1989, an immediate call to reduce the indoor nitrogen dioxide (NO_{2}) level, was triggered by widely publicised articles and media coverage in New South Wales, highlighting the effect this chemical has on respiratory sensitive people, such as asthmatics and those with bronchial problems.

In the heat of the indoor air quality debate various State institutions in Australia were advised to switch to flued gas heaters and electric heating.

New South Wales in contrast, through combined action by Australian Gas Light Company, Health Authorities and the New South Wales Public Works Department, formulated initial indoor air quality guidelines. These guidelines formed the basis for Australian Gas Appliance Code restrictions for nitrogen dioxide NO_{2}emissions from unflued heaters, now adopted Australia wide.

John Joyce became aware that no other overseas regulatory body made a distinction between NO and NO_{2} in their environmental guidelines or codes. Furthermore it appeared that total nitrogen oxides level requirements were in place irrespective of whether emissions were flued or not.

Consequently John Joyce learned that a 'harmless' part of NO_{x} emissions, nitric oxide (NO), in the presence of hydrocarbons (such as household aerosol propellants, possible gas leaks and ingress of vehicle exhaust fume), converts to NO_{2}. This was found to be the case in the New South Wales school investigation. In a scientific sense it had become practice to calculate both NO + NO_{2}, when measuring oxides of nitrogen levels in emissions. Hence the now commonly used reference to "total NO_{x}".

=== Greenhouse gas and photochemical smog ===
Natural gas by composition has a distinct advantage over other fossil fuels in terms of carbon dioxide, particulate and sulfur dioxides produced when converting to useful energy. In the early 1990s numerous countries were in the process of substituting oil and coal with natural gas for their energy and electric power needs.

To maintain this advantage as an "environmentally friendly" fuel, Australian gas utilities are effectively reducing gas losses (methane emissions) in their deliveries, and impose strict codes on appliance manufacturers and installers against gas leakage.

Nevertheless environmental experts see the production of oxides of nitrogen as a major menace in the formation of greenhouse gases and photochemical smog. The interaction of NO_{x} with hydrocarbons from vehicle exhausts and sunlight can also form low level ozone. In the stratosphere (some 25 km up), ozone is helpful by absorbing the fiercer part of the ultraviolet radiation of the sun, but at ground level it damages materials and vegetation. It irritates throat, lungs and eyes, and strenuous exercise or work can become painful. Furthermore, the effectiveness of nitrous oxide as a greenhouse gas is magnified by its longer life than carbon dioxide, methane and CFC's.

In essence the rate at which low level ozone is formed is determined by hydrocarbons, whilst the availability of oxides of nitrogen influences the amount it produces. At this point the environmental debate takes a surprising turn as individual industries tend to blame each other's emission as a probable cause.

=== Best Available Control Technology (BACT) ===
It is well established that conventional "blue flame" or bunsen gas burners produce oxides of nitrogen at levels of 30-50 nanograms per joule and are as such not considered to have potential for NO_{x} reduction. Surface combustion burners or radiant tile burners in comparison produce nitrogen oxides' levels 60-70% less. Therefore John Joyce's research into low NO_{x} burners revolved primarily around surface combustion techniques. Another issue was the effect combustion temperatures have on the formation of NO_{x}.

John Joyce's task became even more challenging when he decided not to direct his development towards radiant type surface combustion tiles. The use of radiant heating for most institutional purposes (other than spot heating) is considered impractical as it is too hot close to the heater, while the loss of radiant heat over a distance to be reached is quite dramatic.

Investigations into numerous developments of other types of "low NO_{x}" burners showed that so far such burners were either too complex in design or operation, too expensive or unsuitable. John Joyce's plan was to use high temperature steel mesh, and went on to produce scores of prototype burners until one showed "potential".

The scientific innovative nature of John Joyce's LO-NO_{x} technologies are confirmed by full patent protection in Australia, United States, United Kingdom, Japan, Italy and France.

In 1993 John Joyce received an Australian Design Award and Powerhouse Museum Selection status for his "SLE" heater range, which incorporate LO-NO_{x} burners.

The Australian Academy of Design selected the SLE unflued gas heater range to be featured in the Design Showcase during the "Innovation by Design" National Conference in October 1994

In the United States, John Joyce's LO-NO_{x} water heater burners have successfully undergone a series of exhaustive tests to prove that these particular burners do not act as an ignition source in the presence of flammable vapours, resulting from accidental fuel spillage. There have also been extensive tests carried out to verify its reduction of NO_{2}.

=== Energy efficiencies ===
More tangible cost savings are defined when comparing the energy efficiencies of gas heaters with low NO_{x} emissions with conventional flued types. Gas heaters with emission problems are flued and inherently lose substantial energies in the form of hot flue gases to the atmosphere. In addition, the choice of placement of flued heaters is greatly impaired due to flue installation restrictions.

In contrast, dedicated low emission gas heaters do not require a flue system. Furthermore, with the introduction of oxygen depletion sensors and thermostatic controls, they do not place critical reliance on ventilation as had been the case. These heaters can be positioned more conveniently and centralised to affect optimum warm air distribution. By definition unflued low NO_{x} gas heaters are 100% efficient as all heat energy released from the flame is converted to useful heat.

== Applications of technology ==
- Gas-fired unflued gas heaters
- Gas-fired flued gas heaters
- Gas-fired storage water heaters
