= Bauer College of Business =

Business school of the University of Houston

Coordinates: 29.7209°N 95.3396°W

University of Houston C.T. Bauer College of Business
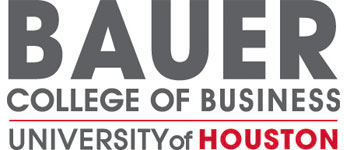
- Type: Public
- Established: 1942
- Parent institution: University of Houston
- Dean: Xianjun Geng
- Undergraduates: 4,200+
- Postgraduates: 1,000+
- Location: Houston, Texas, U.S.
- Campus: Urban
- Website: www.bauer.uh.edu

The C.T. Bauer College of Business is the business school of the University of Houston, and is fully accredited by the AACSB International. It offers BBA, MBA, MS Accountancy, MS Finance and the Houston metropolitan area's only Ph.D. program in business administration.

== History ==
In 1942, Bauer was established as the University of Houston College of Business Administration. In 2000, businessman Charles T. "Ted" Bauer donated $40 million to the College of Business Administration, which was named after him in recognition of his generosity.

The Bauer College is located on the campus of the University of Houston and has been housed in Melcher Hall since 1986. Melcher Hall is named after Leroy Melcher, an alumnus of the University of Houston and successful businessman. Leroy donated $3 million to the business school.

The school has students from many countries around the world and is regarded as one of the most diverse schools in the U.S.

The Bauer College broke ground on June 5, 2008 for the Michael J. Cemo Hall. The hall is named after Michael J. Cemo, a University of Houston alumnus and former president and CEO of AIM Distributors, who donated $3 million to the college. It opened in 2010.

== Programs ==
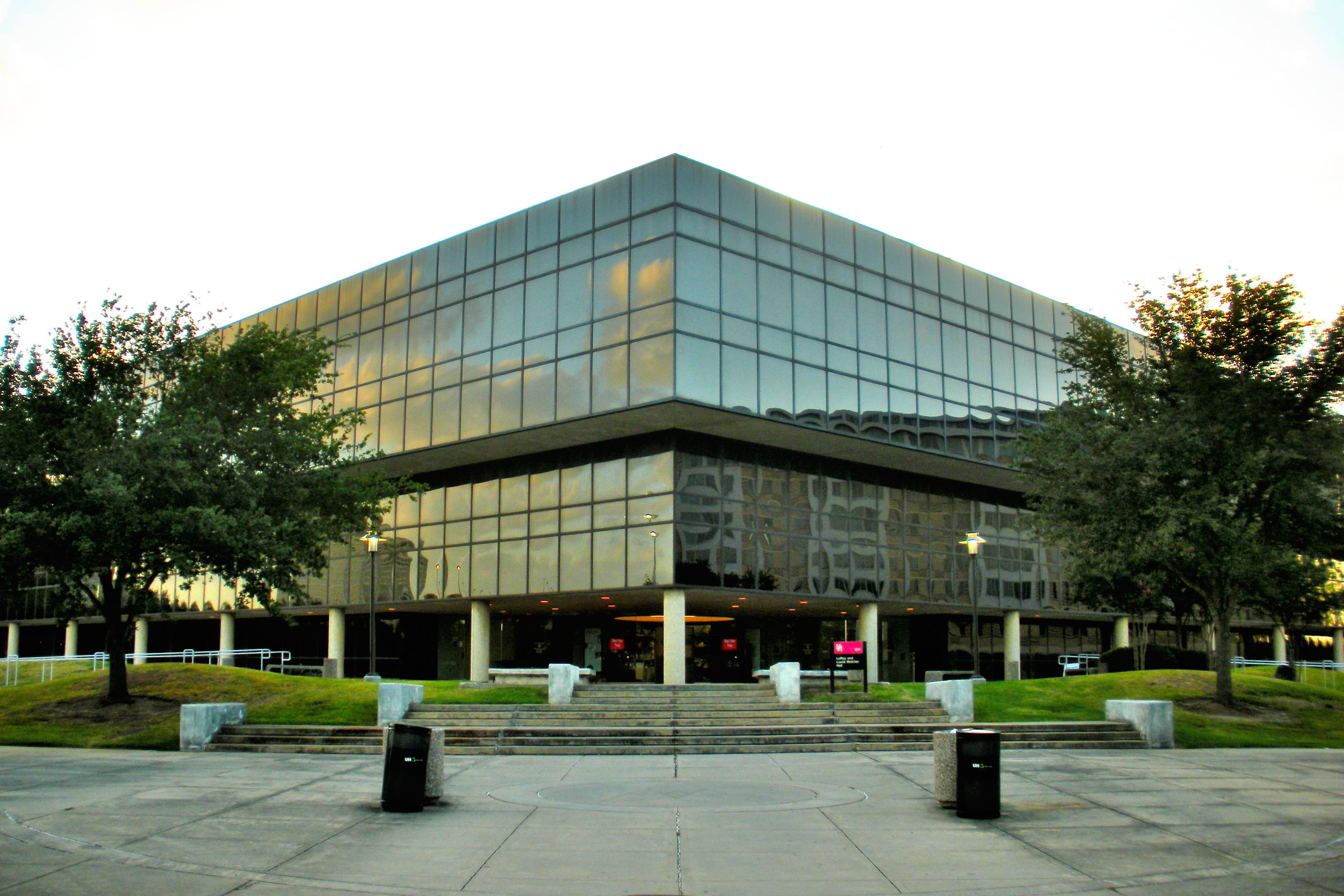
Melcher Hall (Front)

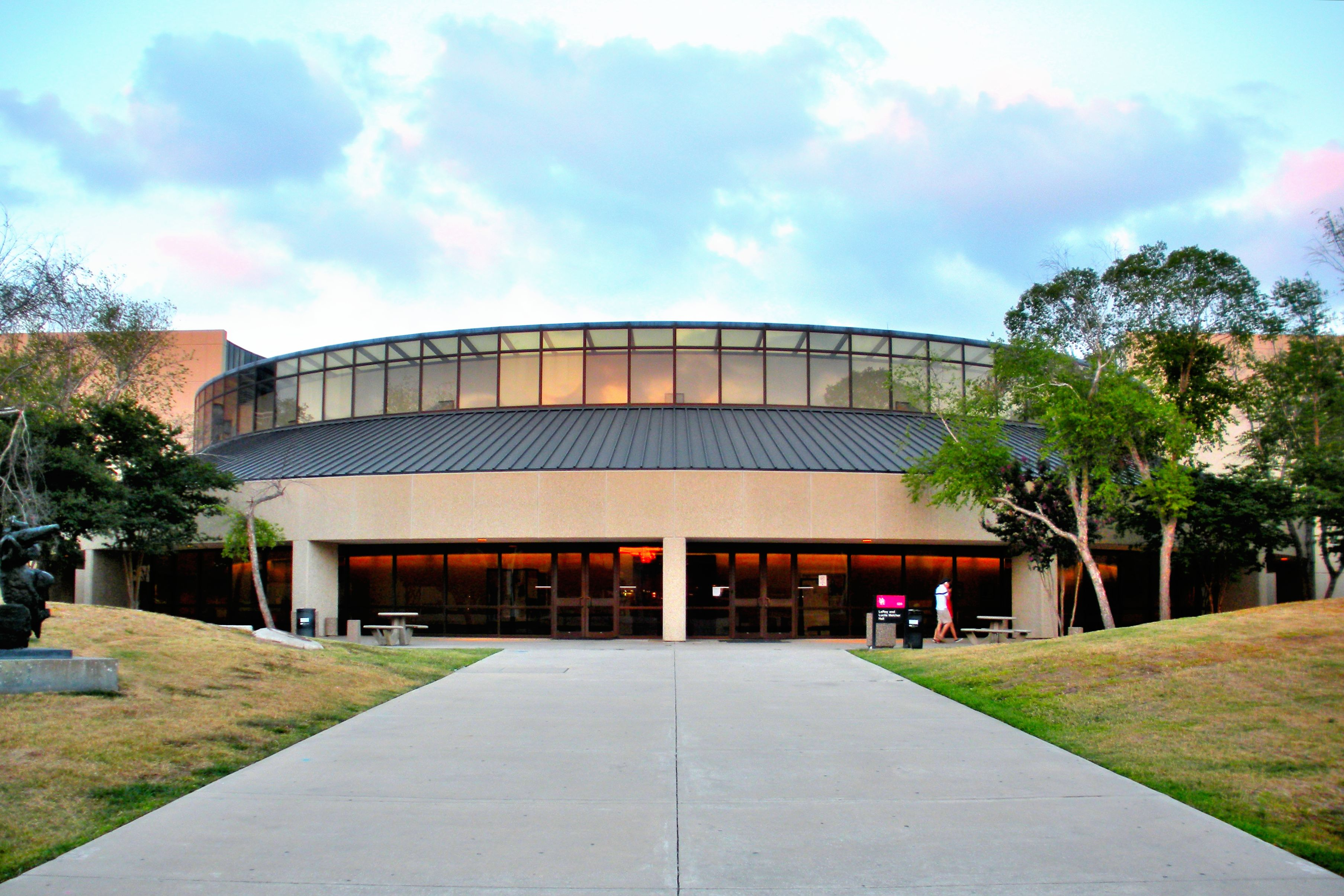
Melcher Hall (Back)

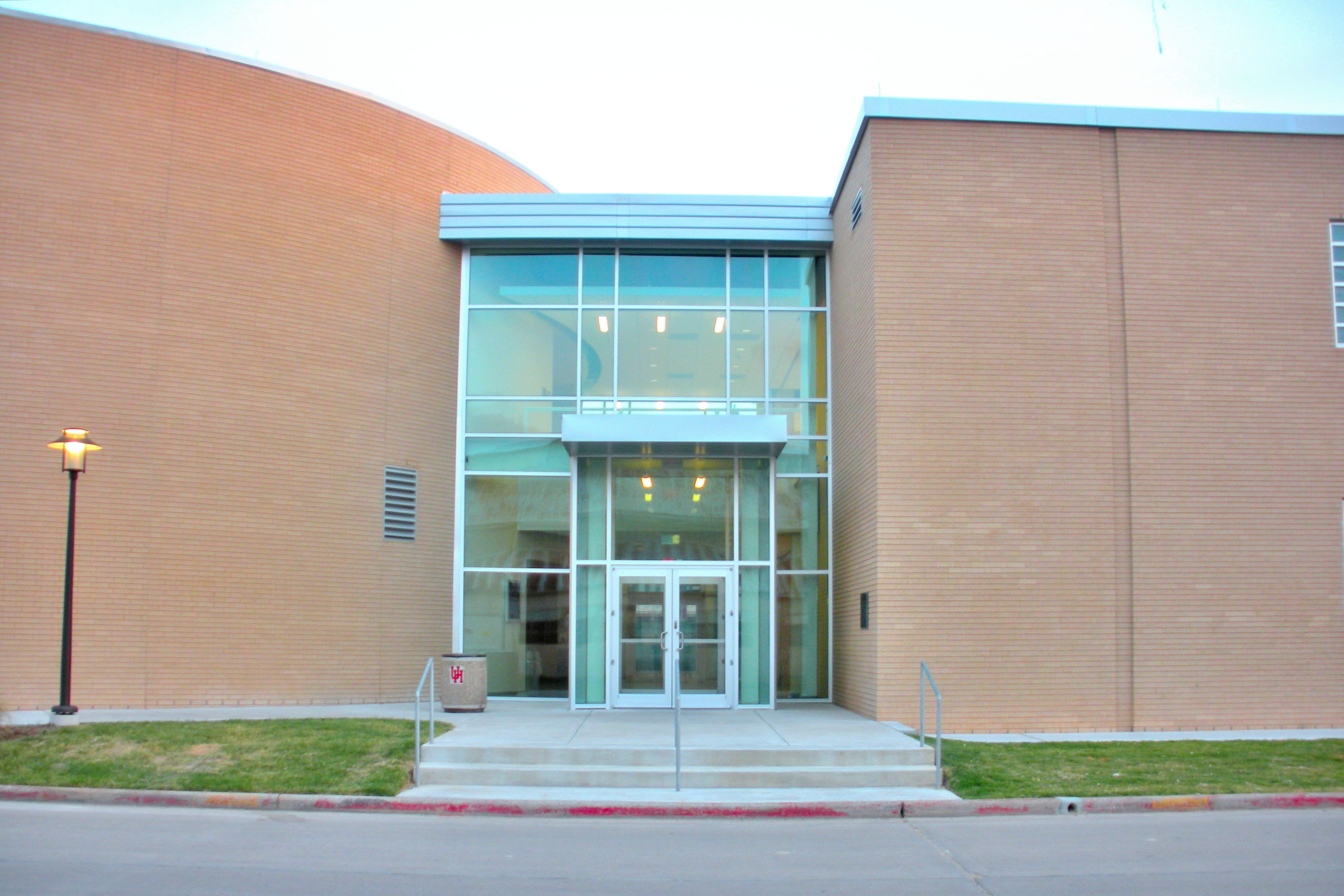
Cemo Hall

The College has five academic departments: Accountancy and Taxation, Decision and Information Sciences, Marketing and Entrepreneurship, Finance, and Management. The student to teacher ratio is 3 to 1. The College offers BBA, MBA, MS, and Ph.D. degrees. Twenty-one certificate options with 100+ electives. Certificate areas include:

- Business Analytics, Business Modeling, and Supply Chain
- Energy
- Finance and Real Estate
- Management and Leadership
- Marketing and Entrepreneurship

C.T. Bauer College of Business Full-Time MBA Certificates and Specializations
Certification Area	Specialization
Business Analytics, Business Modeling and Supply Chain	Business Analytics
Business Analytics, Business Modeling and Supply Chain	Business Modeling and Decision Making
Business Analytics, Business Modeling and Supply Chain	Supply Chain Management
Energy	Economics of the Energy Chain
Energy	Energy Finance
Energy	Energy Investment Analysis
Energy	Energy Risk Management
Finance and Real Estate	Corporate Finance
Finance and Real Estate	Financial Services Management
Finance and Real Estate	Investment Analysis
Finance and Real Estate	Investment Banking and Private Equity
Finance and Real Estate	Real Estate
Management and Leadership	Global Management
Management and Leadership	Human Resources Management
Management and Leadership	Leadership Development
Marketing and Entrepreneurship	Business Consulting
Marketing and Entrepreneurship	Digital Marketing
Marketing and Entrepreneurship	Entrepreneurship
Marketing and Entrepreneurship	Marketing Analytics
Marketing and Entrepreneurship	Product Management
Marketing and Entrepreneurship	Sales Leadership

=== The AIM Center ===
The AIM Center for Investment Management is a business center at Bauer that teaches undergraduate and graduate business students about corporate finance, accounting, information technology, marketing and other disciplines. The center features a laboratory, a conference room with video conferencing capabilities, a classroom, and a lobby with news video and ticker. It is a $5 million facility which opened on February 20, 2002. The center was recognized as one of the best designed business school classrooms in the United States by American School and University magazine.

The AIM Center houses the C. T. Bauer College of Business Cougar Investment Fund, L.L.C. The Cougar Fund is a private investment company run by graduate students, which manages real investors and real money. It began with an initial investment of $1.9 million and has regularly outperformed its benchmark on the S&P 500 Index. It currently manages over $9 million in assets. The Cougar Fund is rated third student stock analysis team in the world and number one (2008) in the United States.

=== Global Energy Management Institute ===
GEMI offers undergraduate and graduate level programs in the energy sector. It opened in the fall of 2002. It offers certificate degrees in energy risk management, energy international project finance and energy accounting. It is a very specialized program that focuses specifically on the energy industry, one of Houston's main industries. The program has earned praise from Business Week.

=== The Program for Excellence in Selling ===
Launched in 2004, the Sales Excellence Institute is built on three pillars: research, executive education and degree programs. Part of the Department of Marketing and Entrepreneurship, SEI offers undergraduate and Masters of Business Administration certificates, a post-graduate program in sales and marketing it also offers executive education in global corporations. Its undergraduate certificate program "The Program for Excellence in Selling" has been in existence since 1996 and offers over 180 hours of live sales training. The program has over 1,100 alumni.

PES’ research provides current sales techniques, sales management, entire sales forces and also includes methods and theories by corporate executives. SEI Executive Director Michael Ahearne has served as editor-in-chief of the Journal of Personal Selling and Sales Management.

== Rankings and awards ==
Business school rankings

United States
- Bloomberg MBA: 55
- USNWR MBA: 43

Bauer has been ranked among the top business schools in the U.S. and is considered among the top 60 worldwide. It has been ranked the best entrepreneurship program in the United States by both the Princeton Review and BusinessWeek.

Full-time MBA program ranked 94th in the nation among 437 schools of business. (U.S. News & World Report 2011)
The evening MBA program is ranked 27th nationally, 4th regionally, and 1st in Houston (BusinessWeek 2007)
The Cougar Fund is ranked the #1 student stock analysis team in the United States and #3 in the world.
Ranked in the top 50 among public undergraduate business schools (BusinessWeek 2007)
Ranked 43rd among public business schools (tied 70th overall) U.S News & World Report 2023
Ranked 52nd among all undergraduate business schools (BusinessWeek 2010)
Ranked 1st among the top undergraduate entrepreneurship programs (Princeton Review, BusinessWeek Magazine, and Entrepreneur Magazine 2008)
Ranked 40th among public undergraduate business schools (U.S. News & World Report 2008)
Top Undergraduate Business Program in Houston
Top Undergraduate Sales Program in the U.S. (largest enrollment and most extensive curriculum)
MBA Program is ranked 5th among public universities for producing CEOs of S&P 500 companies
EMBA Program is ranked 17th in the U.S. among public EMBA programs (2004 Financial Times)
EMBA Program is ranked 76th in the World (2006 Financial Times)
Finance faculty is ranked 8th in the country by the Academic Analytics’ Faculty Scholarly Productivity (FSP) Index

== Alumni ==
This is a partial list of notable alumni of Bauer College of Business. Names on this list should either have an accompanying existing article link which verifies they are an alumnus, or reliable sources as footnotes against the name showing they are a notable alumnus.

- Carol Alvarado (MBA, 2008), Texas State Representative, Former Houston City Councilwoman
- Stephen Chazen (MS, ), President and CEO, Occidental Petroleum
- Michael J Cemo (BS, 1968), President and CEO of A I M Distributors, Inc
- Samuel DiPiazza (MSAcy, 1973), Chairman and Global CEO, PricewaterhouseCoopers
- Ronald C. Green (MBA, 2008), City Controller, City of Houston
- Aylwin Lewis (MBA, 1990), President and CEO, Potbelly Sandwich Works, Former President and CEO, Sears Holdings Corporation,
- John Moores (BS, JD), founder, Peregrine Systems; co-founder, BMC Software; owner, San Diego Padres
- John Stubblefield (BBA, 1970), Former CFO, Sysco Corporation
- Jack Valenti, (BBA, 1946), Former Chairman and CEO, Motion Picture Association
- Andre Ware (BBA, 1989), 1989 Winner of the Heisman Trophy, Quarterback Detroit Lions (1990–1993)
- Kathryn Whitmire (BBA 1968, MSAcy 1970), Former Mayor, Houston, TX
- David A. Williams (MBA, 1992), President and CEO, Make-A-Wish Foundation
- Bruce Williamson (MBA, 1995), Chairman, CEO, and President, Dynegy
- Welcome W. Wilson, Sr. (BBA, 1949), Chairman, GSL Welcome Group
- Bruce D. Broussard (MBA, 1989), President and CEO, Humana
- Hanneke Faber (MBA, 1992), CEO, Logitech
