= Killen Station =

Archaeological site in Ohio, United States

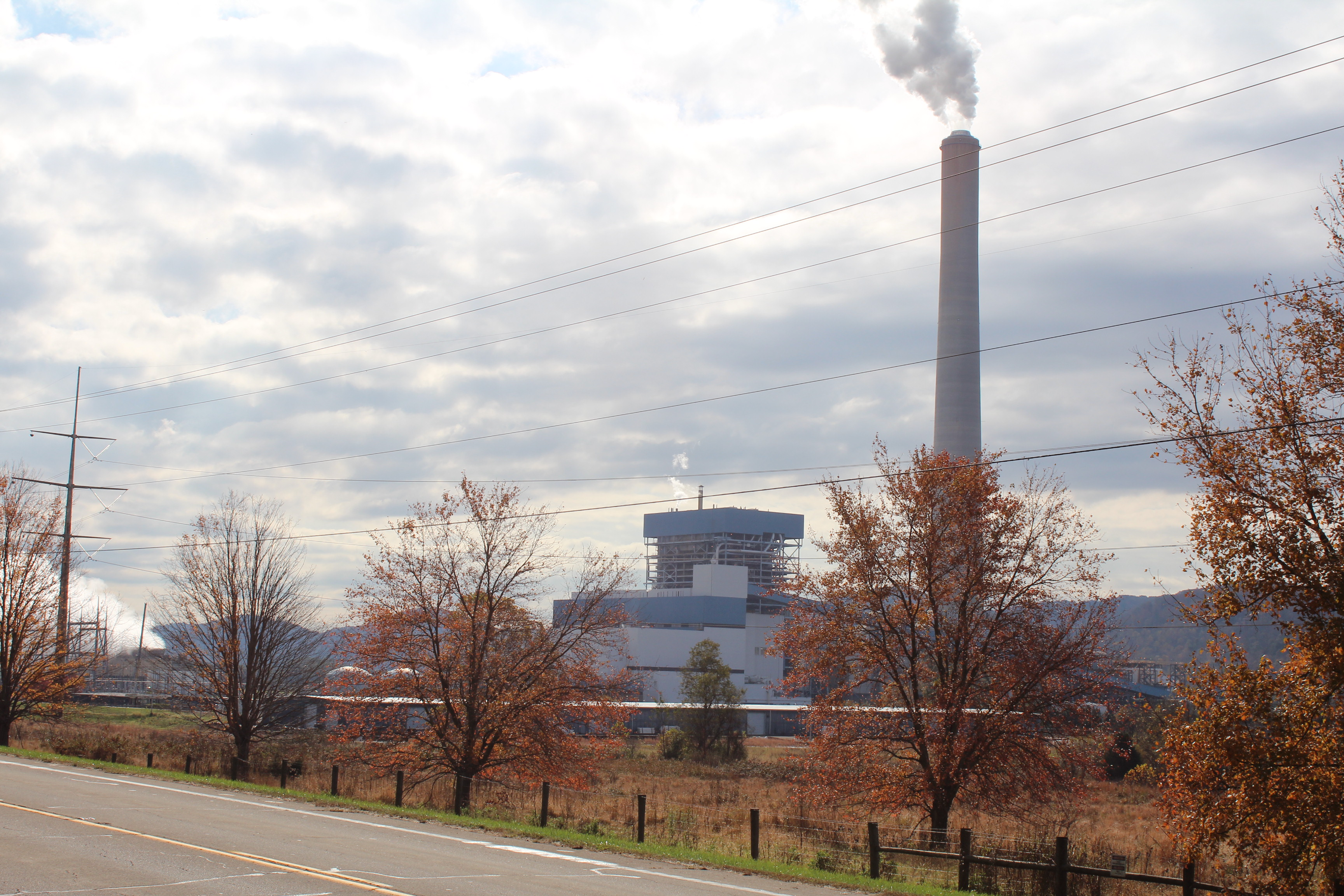
- Killen Station in 2017 viewed from U.S. Route 52
- Country: United States
- Location: Monroe Township, Adams County, near Wrightsville, Ohio
- Coordinates: 38°41′30″N 83°28′47″W
- Status: Demolished
- Commission date: Unit 2: April, 1982; Oil Unit GT2: June, 1982
- Decommission date: May 31, 2018
- Owners: AES Ohio Generation (67%); Dynegy (33%)
- Operator: AES Generation Ohio

Thermal power station
- Primary fuel: Coal; Oil
- Cooling source: Ohio River

Power generation
- Nameplate capacity: 618 MW

External links
- Commons: Related media on Commons

Killen Station was a 618 megawatt (MW) dual-fuel power generating facility located east of Wrightsville, Ohio in Adams County, Ohio. The power plant had two units: one coal-fired and one oil-fired. At the time of its closure, it was operated by AES Ohio Generation, a subsidiary of the AES Corporation. The plant began operations in 1982 and ceased generation on May 31, 2018.

== History ==
Construction of Killen Station began in 1974 and commenced commercial generation in 1982 at a cost of $588 million. The plant was named after Robert B. Killen, a former chairman of Dayton Power & Light (DP&L). A second coal unit was planned, but was cancelled in 1980 after estimates for electric use in the next decade were revised showing demand stagnating. Killen's coal unit was retrofitted with a selective catalytic reduction (SCR) system between 2003 and 2004 by Black & Veatch. The SCR was installed to comply with the Clean Air Act's 1990 amendments and Ohio's NO_{x} State Implementation Plan (SIP). Flue-gas desulfurization (FGD) equipment, designed by the Chiyoda Corporation, was installed at Killen in 2007 to reduce sulfur dioxide (SO_{2}) emissions. In August 2014, Duke Energy sold its stake in the coal unit to Dynegy. Operations at Killen were transferred from DP&L to AES Ohio Generation in October 2017.

=== Closure ===
DP&L announced plans in March 2017 to close Killen Station along with its sister plant J.M. Stuart Station due to economic and environmental challenges in an agreement with the Sierra Club and several unnamed parties. The commercial generation of Killen ceased on May 31, 2018. In December 2019, DP&L sold the site to Kingfisher Development for remediation and redevelopment.

== Incidents ==
A worker was killed in August 1984 after getting pinned in a coal chute.

A worker died in June 1994 from hyperthermia after attempting to rescue workers stranded in the plant's 900 feet (270 m) smokestack.

On December 9, 2020, contractors were working to prepare the site for demolition. At around 8:30 A.M. the primary building collapsed injuring several and trapping others. Three workers were rescued from the collapse. Three days later, one worker was found dead and on January 8, 2021, thirty days after the collapse, the final worker's body was recovered.

== Archaeological site ==
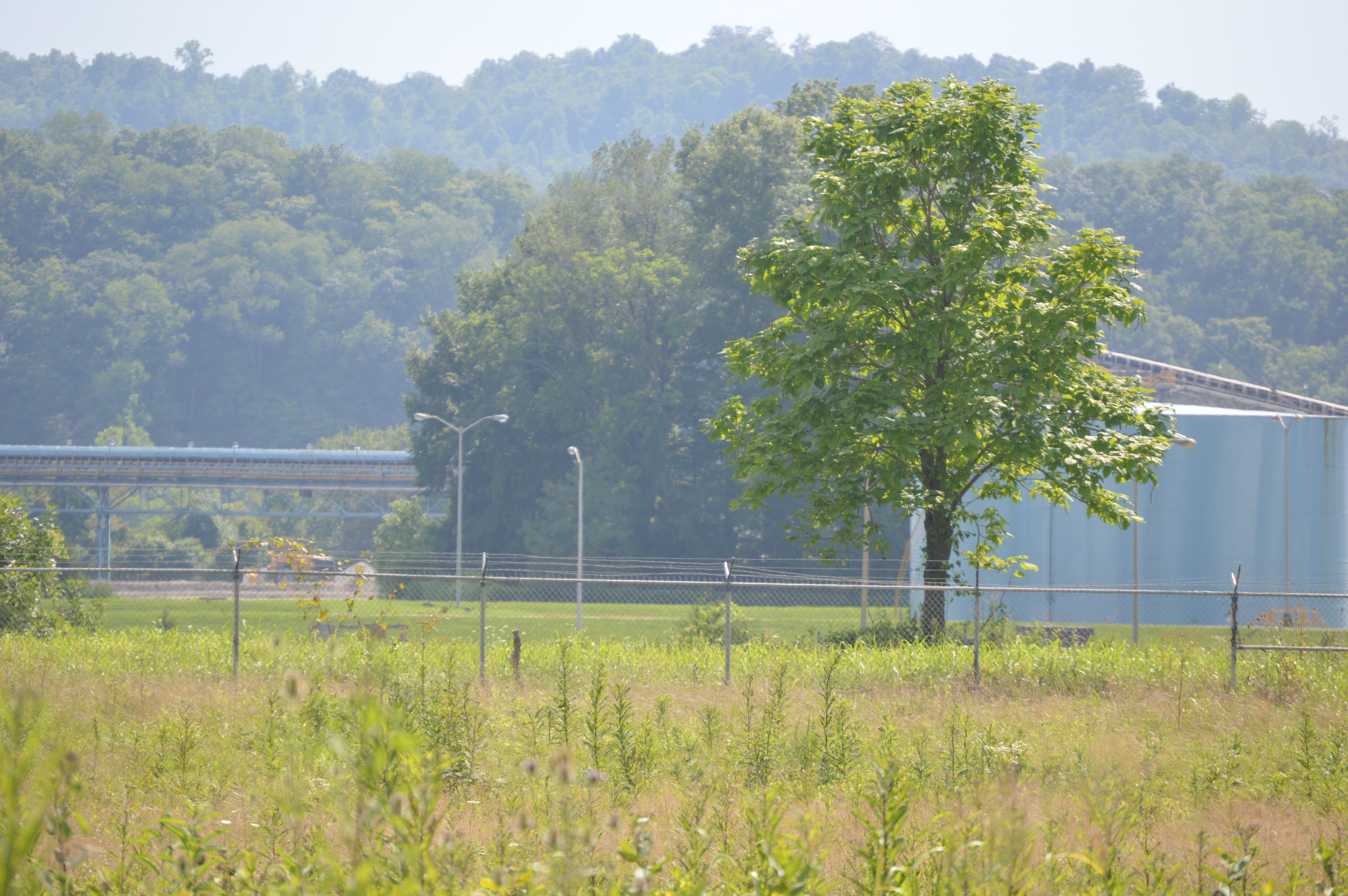
Adena burial mound is located on the plant's site. Shown here where the clump of trees are behind the isolated tree in front.

The lands owned by DP&L for Killen Station contain two archaeological sites that date back to the Adena and Fort Ancient cultures. To prevent the sites from being disturbed during construction of the power plant, the Ohio Historical Society applied to the Department of the Interior to include Wamsley Village and an Adena burial mound on the National Register of Historic Places. Both listings were added to the National Register in 1974. Archeology was conducted at Wamsley Village and the mound. The archeologists discovered a number of artifacts and burials. These sites remain preserved today.

== See also ==
- List of power stations in Ohio
