= J.M. Stuart Station =

Demolished coal power plant in Ohio, U.S.

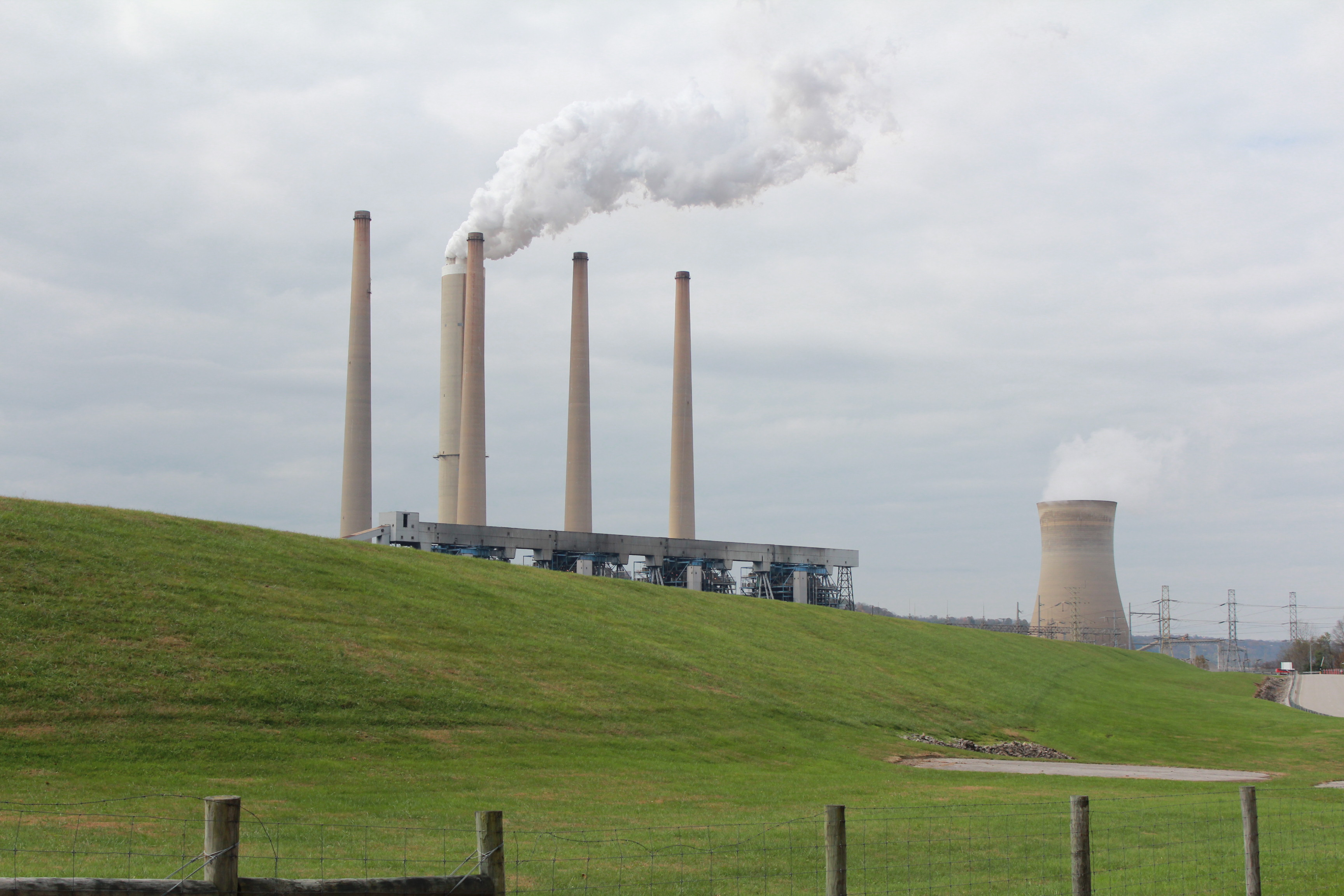
- J.M. Stuart Station in 2017 viewed from U.S. Route 52
- Country: United States
- Location: Sprigg Township, Adams County, near Aberdeen, Ohio
- Coordinates: 38°38′16″N 83°41′35″W
- Status: Demolished
- Commission date: Unit 1: 1971; Unit 2: 1970; Unit 3: 1972; Unit 4: 1974
- Decommission date: Unit 1: 2017; Units 2–4: May 24, 2018
- Owners: AES Ohio Generation (35%); AEP Generation Resources (26%); Dynegy (39%)
- Operator: AES Ohio Generation

Thermal power station
- Primary fuel: Coal
- Cooling source: Ohio River

Power generation
- Nameplate capacity: 2,318 MW

External links
- Commons: Related media on Commons

J.M. Stuart Station was a 2.3-gigawatt (2,318 MW) coal power plant located east of Aberdeen, Ohio in Adams County, Ohio. The power plant had four units and was operated by AES Ohio Generation, a subsidiary of the AES Corporation. It began operations in 1970 and ceased on May 24, 2018.

== History ==
Construction of J.M. Stuart commenced in 1966 with Units 2, 1, and 3 beginning commercial generation in 1970, 1971, and 1972 respectively. The plant became fully operational with the completion of Unit 4 in 1974. The total cost of building Stuart was $390 million. The plant was named after James M. Stuart, a former chairman of Dayton Power & Light (DP&L). Although the plant's cooling source was the Ohio River, its discharge egressed into Little Three Mile Creek. In the 1980s, Stuart was an early adopter of the prompt gamma neutron activation analysis (PGNAA), a coal analyzer, that increased on-line reliability for the plant. In August 2014, Duke Energy sold its stake in the coal units to Dynegy. American Electric Power (AEP) held a 26% stake in the coal units through a subsidiary. Operations at Stuart were transferred from DP&L to AES Ohio Generation in October 2017.

=== Closure ===
DP&L announced plans in March 2017 to close J.M. Stuart along with its sister plant Killen Station due to economic and environmental challenges in an agreement with the Sierra Club and several unnamed parties. Electricity generation at Stuart ceased on May 24, 2018. In December 2019, DP&L sold the site to Kingfisher Development for remediation and redevelopment.

== Environmental mitigation ==
During construction of Unit 4, a cooling tower was commissioned by Cincinnati Gas and Electric (CG&E) (a forerunner of Duke Energy) in order to meet pollution control mandates set by the State of Ohio. Its four smokestacks were upgraded with electrostatic precipitators to prevent fly ash from being released into the atmosphere. Stuart was the test site for the Low-NO_{x} Cell Burner (LNCB) designed by Babcock & Wilcox. The LNCB project utilized Unit 4 over a duration of 53 months from 1990 to 1994. The test confirmed that a LNCB can reduce nitrogen oxide (NO_{x}) emissions by more than 50%, but the carbon monoxide (CO) emissions were inconclusive. Each unit at Stuart was retrofitted with selective catalytic reduction (SCR) systems between 2003 and 2004 by Black & Veatch. The SCRs were installed to comply with the Clean Air Act's 1990 amendments and Ohio's NO_{x} State Implementation Plan (SIP). Flue-gas desulfurization (FGD) equipment, designed by Black & Veatch with assistance from the Chiyoda Corporation was installed at J.M. Stuart in 2008. The FGD equipment reduced 97% of the plant's sulfur dioxide (SO_{2}) emissions. In order to support the FGD process, a 900 ft (274 m) smokestack was constructed.

== Incidents ==
An electrical arc flash killed two employees in October 1994. DP&L was levied a $295,000 fine by the Occupational Safety and Health Administration (OSHA) for hazardous safety practices.

A worker was killed in July 2006 when a pile of fly ash slipped back into the pond burying the equipment and the worker.

On January 10, 2017, an explosion occurred at Unit 1 injuring six people. The plant had to be temporarily shut down while DP&L investigated and assessed the explosion. The plant began a restart the following month. DP&L never restarted commercial generation of Unit 1 after the incident.

== Archaeological site ==
The lands owned by DP&L for J.M. Stuart contain the Greenlee Tract. This tract was used by Native Americans in the past over an 8,000 year period and later settlers in the 19th Century. As DP&L looked to expand its fly ash disposal areas in the 1990s, they funded a study to determine the archaeology resources of the Greenlee Tract. Archaeology was conducted on the tract periodically from 1991 to 2011. Over 200,000 artifacts were collected revealing human activity from the Pre-Columbian era and from the early 19th Century.

The site of Stuart Station also included a small cemetery with the graves of five pioneer families of Adams County - Bradford, Ellis, Grimes, Kimble, and Moore. DP&L, under the direction of Chief Civil Engineer C. Russell Dole, researched the family genealogies, gained permission to remove the graves from the closest kin, and reburied the families at Manchester Cemetery in Manchester, Ohio. A dedication ceremony took place on October 30, 1963.

== See also ==
- List of largest power stations in the United States
- List of power stations in Ohio
