= Charles Watson (businessman) =

American businessman

Charles Watson is the founder of The Natural Gas Clearinghouse. Later renamed Dynegy, the firm was a highly diverse energy trading company that was similar to rival Enron in many respects. Watson attempted to orchestrate a buyout of Enron in late 2001, but withdrew following the restating of Enron's financials. At one time this was the 11th to the largest corporation on the Fortune 500.

Watson left Dynegy in late 2002 when Dynegy's own finances took a turn for the worse amid allegations of accounting frauds, misconduct in the California energy crises and other serious problems. He was replaced by Bruce Williamson.

He later founded Eagle Energy Partners where he acted as the chairman. Eagle Energy Partners was later acquired by Lehman Brothers and then sold to EDF Trading, pending Lehman Brothers' bankruptcy. At Lehman Brothers, he served as a Partner and Managing Director. He currently serves on the board of EDFT, the managing partner and governing body of Eagle Energy Partners. He is also a Senior Advisor to the EDF Group in North America.

Watson, an Oklahoma State University alumnus, and member of the Sigma Chi fraternity, is principal of Caldwell Watson. He is currently the minority owner of the Iowa Wild hockey team, and is the vice chairman and minority owner of the Houston Texans, where he chaired Houston's 2004 Super Bowl host committee.

Watson was inducted into the Texas Business Hall of Fame and was named "Master Entrepreneur" by Ernst & Young. In 2005, Watson was named Chairman of the Sigma Chi Foundation.

Watson has served on the Boards of the Independent Petroleum Association of America (IPAA), Natural Gas Supply Association (NGSA), Interstate Natural Gas Association of America (INGAA), Edison Electric Institute (EEI), Natural Gas Council (NGC) and is currently on the boards of Baker Hughes, Baylor College of Medicine, Mainstream Renewable Power, Shona Energy Company, Patman Drilling Inc., Central Houston Inc., and Angeleno Group. In 1996 Watson co-founded Caldwell Watson Real Estate Group and was a Principal. He is the chairman of Wincrest Ventures, a venture capital company he founded in 1994. He has been a Director of Theatre Under the Stars and Hobby Center for the Performing Arts. Watson is a Member of the Executive Committee of Edison Electric Institute as well as a founding Member of the Natural Gas Council. Partners at one point with Fritz Strayer.

Mr. Watson is also chairman and CEO of Advanced Blast Protection Systems (ABPS), a company that developed new technology to greatly increase the protection tools available to those dealing with blast, fire and ballistic assaults.

He is now chairman of the board and co-founder of Twin Eagle Resource Management (founded in September 2010), a Houston-based company that provides wholesale energy and midstream services throughout North America.

Since 2005, he has served on the Board of Advisors for Angeleno Group, a private equity and venture capital firm focused on sustainable energy investments.

Watson is also the former owner of the Houston Aeros minor league hockey team (now the Iowa Wild).
