= Artevelde University of Applied Sciences =

Catholic college in Ghent, Belgium

- Arteveldehogeschool
- Motto: Dé makers van de wereld van morgen
- Motto in English: Creators of tomorrow's world
- Established: 2000
- Religious affiliation: Catholic
- Academic affiliations: Associatie universiteit Gent (AUGent)
- Students: 14000
- Location: Ghent, East Flanders, 9000, Belgium; 51.0554664°N 3.7230305°E
- Website: www.artevelde-uas.be

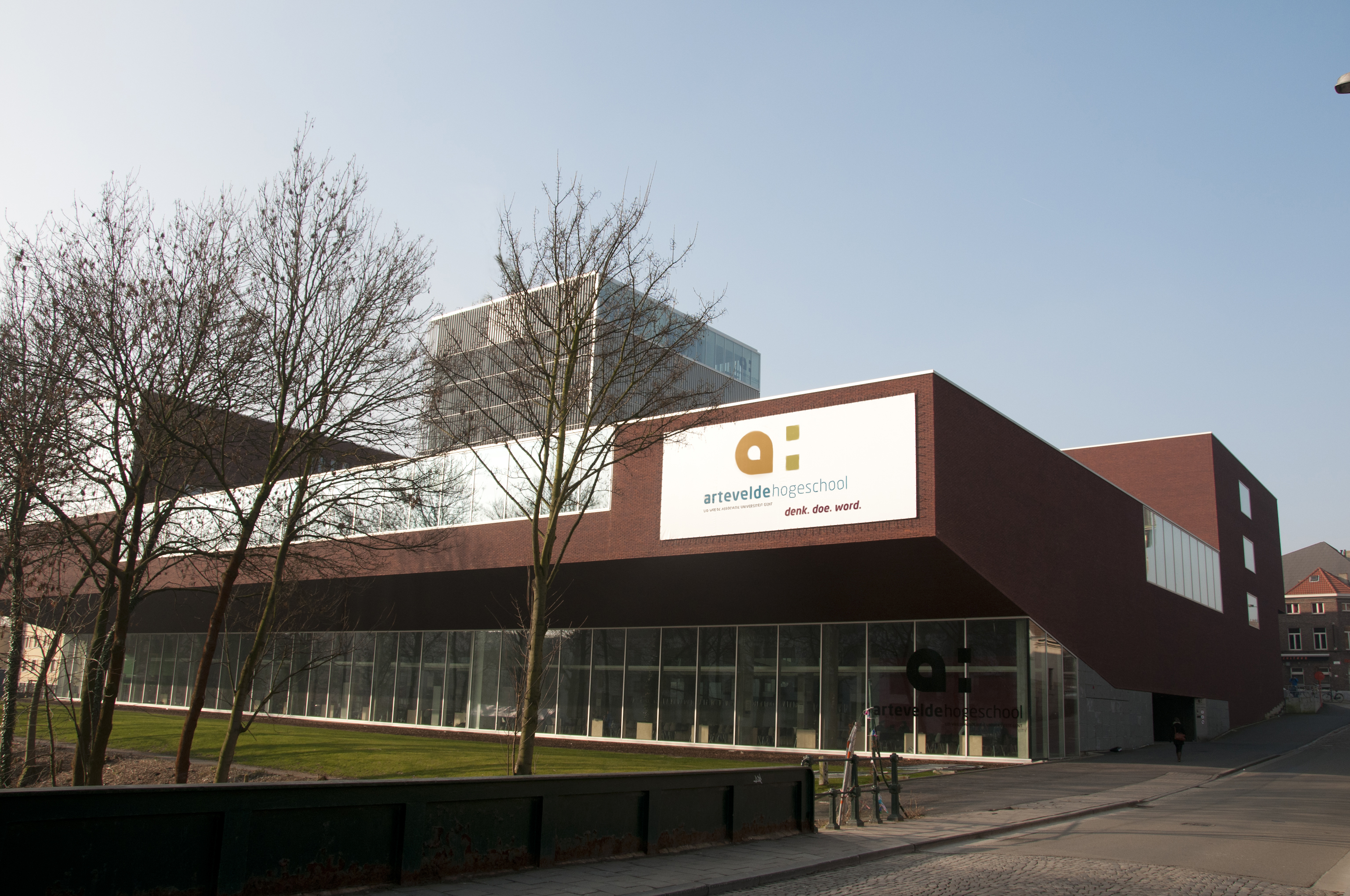
Campus Kantienberg Arteveldehogeschool

The Artevelde University of Applied Sciences (Dutch: Arteveldehogeschool) is a Catholic University of Applied Sciences in the city of Ghent, Belgium. The Artevelde University of Applied sciences offers a diverse range of bachelor-programs, bachelor-after-bachelor-programs, postgraduate-programs and schoolings.

== History ==
In 2000 the school was merged from 4 Catholic institutions of higher education:

- the Hogeschool voor Economisch en Grafisch Onderwijs (EGON) – a business and design college
- the Katholieke Hogeschool voor Gezondheidszorg Oost-Vlaanderen (KaHoG) – a health care college
- the Katholieke Hogeschool voor Lerarenopleiding en Bedrijfsmanagement (KLBO) – a teacher-training and management college
- the Sociale Hogeschool KVMW Gent – a college for social work

In 2003 it became an academic affiliate of the Associatie Universiteit Gent (AUGent).

== Number of students ==
At the time of the merger in 2000, these colleges together comprised approximately 6,700 students and nearly 800 staff, and were the third largest institution of higher education in Flanders.

On 1 January 2017, the school had more than 14,000 students and 1,300 staff members.

== Campuses ==
The school has 12 campuses:

- Campus Brusselsepoortstraat
- Campus Goudstraat
- Campus Hoogpoort
- Campus Kantienberg
- Campus Kattenberg
- Campus Leeuwstraat
- Campus Mariakerke
- Campus Sint-Amandsberg
- Campus Sint-Annaplein
- Campus Stropkaai
- Campus Watersportbaan
- Campus Tinelstraat
