= David A. Williams =

David A. Williams is the president and chief executive officer of Genesys Works. Previously, he served as the president and chief executive officer of the Make-A-Wish Foundation.

== Education ==
Williams graduated from Dallas High School and from the Bloomsburg University of Pennsylvania with a BBA and later attended at the University of Houston (Bauer College of Business), where he earned an MBA.

== Biography ==
Williams grew up in Pennsylvania and moved to Houston, Texas after graduating college to work for Shell Oil Company. In Houston, he earned a Master of Business Administration from the University of Houston. He worked for Shell for two years before going into the non-profit sector.

Williams began his work in the nonprofit sector by working on the board of the Houston Food Bank. He then worked for 10 years at Habitat for Humanity International where he became the chief operating officer.

In July 2006, he was appointed to the Helping to Enhance the Livelihood of People (HELP) Around the Globe Commission by President George W. Bush.

He is now the CEO of Shelters to Shutters - a not for profit aimed at helping the under homed and homeless gain employment and housing through a public / private partnership.
