= Houston Aeros (1994–2013) =

Professional ice hockey team

- City: Houston, Texas
- League: American Hockey League
- Operated: 1994–2013
- Home arena: Compaq Center (1994–2003); Toyota Center (2003–2013)
- Colors: Green, red, wheat, white
- Owners: Minnesota Sports and Entertainment (86%), Chuck Watson (10%), Nick Sheppard (4%)
- Affiliates: Minnesota Wild (2001–2013); Dallas Stars (2004–2005)

Franchise history
- 1994–2013: Houston Aeros
- 2013–present: Iowa Wild

Championships
- Regular season titles: 1 (1998–99)
- Division titles: 2 (1998–99, 2002–03)
- Conference titles: 3 (1998–99, 2002–03, 2010–11)
- Turner Cups: 1 (1998–99)
- Calder Cups: 1 (2002–03)

The Houston Aeros were a professional ice hockey team in the International Hockey League (IHL) and the American Hockey League (AHL). The team played in Houston, Texas, at The Summit (renamed Compaq Center in 1998) from 1994 until 2003 and the Toyota Center from 2003 to 2013. In the IHL, the team operated as an independent minor league team from 1994 to 2001, though the team occasionally accepted players on loan from various National Hockey League (NHL) clubs for development. Upon joining the AHL for the 2001–02 season, they became the primary affiliate of the one-year-old NHL expansion team, the Minnesota Wild, a partnership they maintained until the franchise's relocation in 2013. While the team's only formal partnership with the Dallas Stars was a partial affiliation agreement during the 2004–05 season, Dallas occasionally sent some of their prospects to the Aeros on individual loans from 1993 to 2005, until the establishment of the Iowa Stars gave Dallas its own primary farm team.

As of September 2025, Jared Spurgeon, Matt Dumba, Charlie Coyle, Darcy Kuemper, Jonas Brodin, Jason Zucker, Erik Haula, Brent Burns, and Mikael Granlund are the only players active in the NHL who had once spent time in Houston with Spurgeon and Brodin as the only ones still with the Wild.

== History ==
=== IHL years ===
The Houston Aeros started out as an expansion franchise in the International Hockey League (IHL) in 1994 with home games at The Summit. The team's name was a tribute to the original Houston Aeros of the World Hockey Association in the 1970s, who won the Avco World Trophy twice with hockey legend Gordie Howe anchoring the team. The Aeros were the second IHL team to be named after a WHA franchise, the first being the Phoenix Roadrunners; unlike the Roadrunners, who used the same logo as their WHA predecessor, the IHL Aeros used a new logo, a Douglas B-23 Dragon bomber underneath a stylized wordmark. The original color scheme was forest green, navy blue, and a red accents on jerseys.

The team was an immediate success, both on the ice and at the gate. The Aeros posted a winning record in their inaugural season and made the playoffs, while the team repeatedly sold out its home games at The Summit after not having professional hockey in the region for nearly two decades. Despite missing the playoffs in their sophomore campaign, the Aeros spent the back half of the 1990s becoming one of the more dominant teams of the IHL. Independently owned and operated by Chuck Watson without a primary National Hockey League (NHL) affiliate, the franchise spent money on younger players still trying to make a name for themselves and former NHL players at the end of their careers. Some of these signings included Mark Freer, who set the Houston franchise record for career goals, eventual coach Mike Yeo, veteran NHL player Jim Paek, and goaltending duo Frederic Chabot and Manny Fernandez. In 1996, Watson hired former Hartford Whalers' player Dave Tippett as his head coach. Houston won 44 games in 1996–97 and followed that with their first 50-win campaign the next year, losing in the 1998 Western Conference Finals to the Long Beach Ice Dogs.

By the start of the 1998–99 season, the Aeros were led by the goalie tandem of Chabot and Fernandez posted a combined 2.35 goals against average, the best average in the league, minor league journeyman Jeff Christian scored a team-leading 45 goals and 109 points (including 88 assists) from former Michigan Wolverines' player Brian Wiseman. Houston earned a 54–15–13 record for 121 points in the standings and the Fred A. Huber Trophy for the regular season championship.

Despite their regular season, the Aeros struggled in the playoffs. While they earned a bye from the best-of-three preliminary round, it took Houston the full five games series to eliminate the Long Beach Ice Dogs in the second round. In the Western Conference Finals, Houston faced the Chicago Wolves, which took seven games for the Aeros to advance to their first Turner Cup Finals. The Aeros then faced the Orlando Solar Bears for the 1999 Turner Cup and again lasted seven games. In front of a sold-out home crowd of more than 16,000, the Aeros won their first championship with a 5–3 victory.

Following the 1999 Turner Cup championship, Dave Tippett left to take an assistant job with the Los Angeles Kings. Captain Mike Yeo signed an NHL contract with the Pittsburgh Penguins, who assigned him to their minor league affiliate in the AHL, the Wilkes-Barre/Scranton Penguins. While Houston still posted winning seasons with playoff appearances the next two years, they were never able to get close to another Turner Cup.

=== AHL years ===
By 2001, the IHL was struggling financially. The league had rapidly expanded in the 1980s and 1990s, included moving into already established NHL markets. As a result, the NHL actively encouraged its owners to reassign their development operations to clubs in the American Hockey League (AHL), the chief rival of the IHL. Without any support from the NHL and league costs increasing, the IHL declared bankruptcy and disbanded during the summer of 2001. With the AHL looking to increase its prestige as the top development league for the NHL, the AHL began discussions to absorb some of the IHL's clubs. The AHL and IHL eventually agreed for the AHL to absorb six franchises for the 2001–02 season: the Aeros, Chicago Wolves, Grand Rapids Griffins, Milwaukee Admirals, Manitoba Moose, and Utah Grizzlies.

The Aeros joined the AHL one year after the NHL expanded with the Minnesota Wild and did not have a primary development affiliate. Due to Houston's George Bush Intercontinental Airport making travel for prospects easier, the Wild entered an agreement with the Aeros as their top development affiliate. Todd McLellan was installed as head coach by the Wild and the Aeros made the Western Conference Finals in their first AHL season before falling to their old IHL rivals, the Chicago Wolves.

For the 2002–03 season, the Aeros were led by 31 goals from Jean-Guy Trudel and goaltending from Johan Holmqvist and Derek Gustafson. Houston swept the Milwaukee Admirals in the first round, defeated the Norfolk Admirals in six games, and then advanced through the Western Conference Finals with a game seven win over the Grand Rapids Griffins. Houston faced the Hamilton Bulldogs in the 2003 Calder Cup Finals, again going for the full seven games before the Aeros won the Calder Cup.

Before the 2003–04 season, the team moved to the newly opened Toyota Center. As part of the transition, the majority ownership of the Aeros was sold to the Minnesota Wild who then replaced the original bomber logo to a new logo featuring a forward-facing modern fighter jet below a bold "AEROS", and switched to the WHA Aeros colors of light and dark blue for two seasons. As NHL teams began to build stronger ties with their farm clubs, the Aeros colors were changed to match the Wild's forest green and iron range red with wheat accents. Prior to the 2006–07 season, the Aeros brought back the original bomber logo associated with their championship seasons with only minor color alterations; the navy blue elements of the original logo were replaced with forest green.

On the ice, the Aeros remained competitive, qualifying for the playoffs eight times in the last ten seasons. They made it to the 2009 Western Conference Finals before being eliminated by the Manitoba Moose and made it back to the Calder Cup Finals in 2011, but lost in six games to the Binghamton Senators.

The Aeros played its final game on May 4, 2013, in a 7–0 loss to the Grand Rapids Griffins in a game in the opening round of the 2013 Calder Cup playoffs.

=== Relocation to Iowa ===
Despite the local popularity and high average attendance of the team, the team was having trouble off the ice where the Aeros and owner Chuck Watson were part of dispute with the Houston Rockets and owner Les Alexander over their shared arenas. Since the 1990s, Watson operated The Summit, which acted as the home arena for both teams, and had control over the lease agreement with the Rockets, which had been purchased by Alexander in 1993. When Alexander tried to break the Rockets lease on the building shortly after their 1995 title, Watson blocked the move, holding Alexander to his original agreement of expiration in 2003. While a new arena was needed to replace the aging facility, the two sides agreed to an arena deal in 1997 that would give the Rockets and Aeros equal control over a new building. However, the referendum for a new building was rejected by Harris County voters in 1999.

In 2001, Alexander reached his own agreement with the City of Houston to build the Toyota Center. The lease agreements of both the Aeros and Rockets expired in the summer of 2003, and with the city set to sell Compaq Center to Lakewood Church, the Aeros were forced to move into the Toyota Center and pay rent to the Rockets on a three-year lease. Watson then sold the majority ownership to the Minnesota Sports and Entertainment (MS&E), the parent company of the Minnesota Wild, with Watson retaining a 10% share, in order to pay for the increased costs.

When the initial agreement between the Aeros and Rockets expired, Alexander's rent price skyrocketed. Negotiations were so stymied that Chuck Watson nearly relocated his hockey team in 2006. The AHL and NHL both entered the negotiations and the Aeros and Rockets agreed to a new seven-year agreement that ran through the 2012–13 season. Under the agreement though, the Aeros were paying one of the highest rents of any AHL franchise.

By the 2012–13 season, Alexander had expressed he wanted to use the 38 Aeros' home dates to instead host concerts in order to generate more revenue. In the first negotiations between Alexander and MS&E, the Rockets' owner demanded a 550% increase in the team's rent if they wanted to stay. MS&E instead began exploring other options, settling on Wells Fargo Arena in Des Moines, Iowa, which last was home to the Iowa Chops in 2009. On April 18, 2013, MS&E announced that the Aeros would be relocated to Des Moines at the conclusion of the 2013 Calder Cup playoffs. Following the relocation, MS&E's rent went from one of the highest in the AHL to one of the lowest: 27th of the AHL's 30 franchises.

== Season-by-season results ==
- International Hockey League (1994–2001)
- American Hockey League (2001–2013)

Regular season												Playoffs					
Season	Games	Won	Lost	Ties	OTL	SOL	Points	PCT	Goals for	Goals against	Standing	Year	Prelims	1st round	2nd round	3rd round	Finals
1994–95	81	38	35	—	8	—	84	.519	272	283	2nd, Central	1995	—	L, 1–3, PHX	—	—	—
1995–96	82	29	45	—	8	—	66	.402	262	328	5th, Central	1996	Did not qualify				
1996–97	82	44	30	—	8	—	96	.585	247	228	2nd, Southwest	1997	—	W, 3–0, LV	W, 4–1, SA	L, 1–4, LB	—
1997–98	82	50	22	—	10	—	110	.671	268	214	2nd, Southwest	1998	—	L, 1–3, MIL	—	—	—
1998–99	82	54	15	—	13	—	121	.738	307	209	1st, Southwest	1999	—	W, 3–2, LB	W, 4–3, CHI	—	W, 4–3, ORL
1999–00	82	44	29	—	9	—	97	.591	219	197	3rd, Western	2000	—	W, 4–1, UTA	L, 2–4, CHI	—	—
2000–01	82	42	32	—	8	—	92	.561	229	245	2nd, Western	2001	—	L, 3–4, MTB	—	—	—
2001–02	80	39	26	10	5	—	93	.581	234	232	2nd, West	2002	—	W, 3–2, UTA	W, 4–0, HER	L, 1–4, CHI	—
2002–03	80	47	23	7	3	—	104	.650	266	222	1st, West	2003	—	W, 3–0, MIL	W, 4–2, NOR	W, 4–3, GR	W, 4–3, HAM
2003–04	80	28	34	14	4	—	74	.463	197	220	4th, West	2004	L, 0–2, CIN	—	—	—	—
2004–05	80	40	28	—	6	6	92	.575	212	195	4th, West	2005	—	L, 1–4, CHI	—	—	—
2005–06	80	50	24	—	3	3	106	.663	285	242	2nd, West	2006	—	W, 4–0, PEO	L, 0–4, MIL	—	—
2006–07	80	27	43	—	4	6	64	.400	205	269	7th, West	2007	Did not qualify				
2007–08	80	45	29	—	2	4	96	.600	206	183	3rd, West	2008	—	L, 1–4, RCK	—	—	—
2008–09	80	38	31	—	2	9	87	.544	218	230	3rd, West	2009	—	W, 4–3, PEO	W, 4–3, MIL	L, 4–2, MTB	—
2009–10	80	34	34	—	7	5	80	.500	206	224	7th, West	2010	Did not qualify				
2010–11	80	46	28	—	1	5	96	.613	238	211	2nd, West	2011	—	W, 4–0, PEO	W, 4–3, MIL	W, 4–3, HAM	L, 2–4, BNG
2011–12	76	35	26	—	5	11	86	.566	202	206	4th, Midwest	2012	—	L, 1–3, OKC	—	—	—
2012–13	76	40	26	—	5	5	90	.592	212	199	4th, South	2013	—	L, 2–3, GR	—	—	—

== Players ==
=== Team Captains ===
- Sylvain Cloutier, 2002–2003
- Kirby Law, 2005–2006
- No captain 2006–2007
- Erik Reitz, 2007–2008
- Corey Locke, 2008–2009
- Brandon Rogers, 2009–2010
- Jon DiSalvatore, 2010–2012
- Drew Bagnall, 2012–2013

=== Retired numbers ===
9 Gordie Howe (1973–77 with the WHA team)

== Active players ==
List of former Houston Aeros players still playing organized hockey

=== NHL ===
- Jason Zucker, Buffalo Sabres
- Jared Spurgeon, Minnesota Wild
- Darcy Kuemper, Los Angeles Kings
- Mikael Granlund, Anaheim Ducks
- Erik Haula, Nashville Predators
- Matt Dumba, Pittsburgh Penguins
- Charlie Coyle, Columbus Blue Jackets
- Brent Burns, Colorado Avalanche
- Jonas Brodin, Minnesota Wild

=== Europe ===
- Johan Larsson, Brynas IF, SHL
- Tyler Cuma, Zell am See EF, Alps Hockey League
- C. J. Stretch, Rosenheim Star Bulls, DEL-2
- Nick Petersen, Klagenfurt AC, ICEHL (Austria)
- Joey Martin, Cardiff Devils, EIHL (UK)
- Colton Jobke, EV Landshut, DEL-2
- Carson McMillan, Hannover Scorpions, Oberliga (Germany)
- Harrison Reed, TecArt Black Dragons Erfurt, Oberliga (Germany)

== Franchise records ==
Single season
Goals: Patrick O'Sullivan, 47 (2005–06)
Assists: Brian Wiseman, 88 (1998–99)
Points: Kirby Law, 110 (2005–06)
Penalty minutes: Gord Donnelly, 333 (1995–96)
GAA: Josh Harding, 2.01 (2004–05)
SV%: Josh Harding, .930 (2004–05)
Career
Career goals: Mark Freer, 132
Career assists: Mark Freer, 210
Career points: Mark Freer, 342
Career penalty minutes: Erik Reitz, 721
Career goaltending wins: Frederic Chabot, 126
Career shutouts: Frederic Chabot, 18
Career games: Mark Freer, 469
