= DP&L Inc. =

Electrical power subsidiary of AES Corporation

- Company type: Subsidiary
- Industry: Electrical power industry
- Founded: 1911; 115 years ago
- Headquarters: Dayton, Ohio, United States
- Products: Electricity
- Number of employees: 1,500+ (2008)
- Parent: AES
- Website: www.aes-ohio.com

DPL Inc. (aka DP&L Inc.) is a subsidiary of AES Corporation. Through its subsidiary AES Ohio (formerly The Dayton Power and Light Company, and DPL Energy Resources), DP&L sells to, and generates electricity for, a customer base of over 500,000 people within a 6,000-square-mile (16,000 km^{2}) area of West Central Ohio, including the area around Dayton, Ohio, its namesake. Electricity for DP&L's 24 county service area within Ohio's Miami Valley is primarily generated at eight coal-fired power plants, but DP&L also provides service to its clients via the use of combustion turbines, diesel peaking units, and solar powered properties.

== History ==
The Hills and Dales Railway Company bought Dayton's two competing electric utilities and merged them as the Dayton Power and Light Company, which was incorporated in 1911 under the laws of Ohio. DP&L was the principal subsidiary of DPL providing approximately 99% of DPL's total consolidated revenue and approximately 92% of DPL's total consolidated asset base. DPL and its subsidiaries employed over 1,500 people as of January 31, 2008. Prior to 2000, DP&L also distributed natural gas within its service area; its gas operations were divested in the fall of 2000 to Vectren, an Evansville, Indiana-based company that formed earlier that year. DPL was acquired by AES in 2011. The transaction was valued at $4.7 billion and it enabled AES to acquire all of the outstanding shares of DPL for $3.5 billion in cash, or $30 per share.

In 2018, DP&L, aiming at a restructure of the company, announced that 160 jobs (60 in Ohio and 100 in Indiana) would be cut in the second quarter of the fiscal year. DP&L would also shut down two coal plants it operated in Southern Ohio, J.M. Stuart and Killen. Later that year, DP&L announced it would invest up to $1 million to support the installation of electric vehicle charging stations within its coverage territory in Ohio.

On February 24, 2021, Dayton Power & Light was rebranded as AES Ohio, although retaining its prior name for legal purposes.

== Operations within Puerto Rico ==
Following the aftermath of Hurricane Maria in 2017, DP&L began taking an active role in America's recovery efforts; working alongside AES to renovate the central power grid that was damaged by the storm.
