= Bruce Williamson (businessman) =

American energy company executive

Bruce Williamson is an American energy company executive. He is best known as a former chief executive office (CEO) for global markets of North Carolina-based Duke Energy and CEO of Houston-based Dynegy.

Williamson was born in Great Falls, Montana to George and June Williamson, and graduated from Great Falls High School in 1977. He spent his freshman year of college at the University of Idaho, transferred to the University of Montana-Missoula, and graduated with a bachelor's degree in finance in 1981. After discovering that the only employment he could get in Montana was a $10,000-a-year bank job, he took a position with Shell Oil in Houston, Texas, largely because a friend lived there. He later obtained a Master of Business Administration from the University of Houston.

Williamson left Shell to work for Pan Energy Corporation. Pan Energy merged with the Duke Power Company in 1997 to become Duke Energy. Williamson rose to the position of President and CEO of Duke Energy Global Markets. In 2002, he was named president and chief executive officer of Dynegy. As the CEO of Dynegy, Williamson received an award from the President's White Collar Task Force. Further, the former United States Attorney for the Southern District of Texas, Michael Shelby, stated that Williamson becoming CEO, "has changed the standard operating procedures in such a way that honesty and candor [are] part of the business plan," and Williamson "helped ferret out potential wrongdoers." As the CEO of Dynegy, Williamson restructured Dynegy out of bankruptcy, and reduced Dynegy's outstanding debt by over $10 billion. Williamson resigned as CEO of Dynegy on February 10, 2011, after two takeovers over the company (both of which he supported) failed. In 2012, Dynegy filed for Chapter 11 Bankruptcy to settle with creditors who held around $2.5 Billion in claims over one of its subsidiaries.

In July 2011, Williamson was named president and CEO of Cleco Corporation, a utility holding company based in Louisiana. In his first year as CEO, he finalized the largest wholesale contract ever entered into for the Cleco Corporation by securing a 10-year contract with Dixie Electric Membership Corporation. In December 2013, Cleco Corp. transitioned into the Midcontinent Independent System Operator Market, with the hope that this will provide additional growth opportunities. Operationally, Cleco has improved its employee safety since Williamson joined the company. Comparing results from 2012 to 2011, Cleco reduced personal injuries by 33 percent and its avoidable accidents by 45 percent. Comparing results from 2012 to 2013, Cleco again improved its employee safety record by 20 percent and its avoidable accidents by 40 percent. Also, since Williamson joined Cleco, the company has raised shareholder dividends five times for a total increase of sixty percent.

In 2014, Macquarie Group agreed to buy Cleco Corporation for approximately $3.4 billion in cash attracted by the steady, long-term returns of regulated power assets.

Williamson previously served on the board of directors for Questar Corporation (gas company) and for Southcross Energy. Williamson currently serves on the board of directors for ENMAX. Williamson is also on the University of Houston Dean's Advisory Board for the CT Bauer College of Business and the Chancellor's National Advisory Council.

Williamson and his wife, Kim, live in the Woodlands, TX and have two daughters.
