= Cougar Fund =

American non-profit organization

- Formation: 2001
- Founder: Thomas D. Mangelsen; Cara Blessley Lowe
- Type: Non-profit educational organization
- Purpose: Protection of cougars in America
- Headquarters: Jackson, Wyoming
- Official language: English

The Cougar Fund is a non-profit educational organization concerned with protecting the cougar throughout the Americas. It is based in Jackson, Wyoming.

== History ==
The Cougar Fund was founded in 2001 by the writer Cara Blessley Lowe and the photographer Tom Mangelsen after a first-hand experience observing a lion and her three cubs on the National Elk Refuge in Jackson Hole, Wyoming. Frequent collaborators, Blessley Lowe and Mangelsen produced a book called Spirit of the Rockies: The Mountain Lions of Jackson Hole and a subsequent documentary short film on the historical event. These two pieces went on to garner major national media attention, broadly publicizing the principal issues facing cougars at the dawn of the 21st century: lack of scientific data on cougar populations within state game agencies, inadequate regulations on protection for female cougars and their dependent young, and a dwindling natural habitat further fragmented by human development.

In 2002, Jane Goodall joined the Board of Directors of the Cougar Fund. Since 2010, the Humane Society Wildlife Land Trust supports the Cougar Fund.

== Description ==
The Cougar Fund is a 501(c)3 non-profit educational organization based in Jackson, Wyoming, concerned with protecting the cougar throughout the Americas. The Cougar Fund educates the public on the value of cougars in nature and promotes the gathering and application of sound science in their management.

Important to The Cougar Fund is an ethic of collaborative efforts in approaching predator conservation and management. There is room for all stakeholders to participate in The Cougar Fund, and its membership base includes hunters and non-hunters alike.

== Board of directors ==
- President: Rick Hopkins
- Vice-President, Co-Founder: Thomas D. Mangelsen
- Treasurer, Co-Founder: Cara Blessley Lowe
- Members:
  - Marc Bekoff
  - Patricio Robles Gil
  - Jane Goodall, DBE
  - Corinne E. Rutledge

== Bibliography ==
- Cara Blessley Lowe (24 October 2008). Listening to Cougar. University Press of Colorado. ISBN 978-0870819360.
