= Post Graduate Programme for Executives for Visionary Leadership in Manufacturing =

Visionary Leaders for Manufacturing
- PGPEX VLM
- Established: 1 April 2007
- Chairman: Prof. Sudhir S. Jaiswall
- Head: Alok K Choudhary
- Students: 40 per Batch
- Location: Kolkata, Kanpur, Chennai, India
- Website: www.iimcal.ac.in/programs/pgpex-vlm

The Post Graduate Program for Executives for Visionary Leadership in Manufacturing (PGPEX-VLM) is an MBA program designed to propel promising engineers into top management positions.

== Program mechanics ==
The PGPEX-VLM program is a collaboration of the Indian Institute of Management Calcutta (IIMC), Indian Institute of Technology Kanpur (IITK), and Indian Institute of Technology Madras (IITM), and is supported by the Japanese International Cooperation Agency (JICA).

It is a one-year full-time residential MBA program with 36 weeks of classroom interaction, case studies, tutorials, lab sessions, and project work at IIMC, IIT M, and IITK - a total of 1173+ interaction hours. It also consists of a week's internship in industry, and six weeks of industry visits in India and abroad.

The program aims to develop leadership and management skills, together with cutting-edge technology awareness and proficiency.

== History ==
Since 1991, the Indian economy has been progressively liberalized, and its integration into the global economy is deepening. The growth of the manufacturing sector in the country has been recognized as a key thrust area by the Government of India. But with an increasingly competitive environment, a need was felt to create a critical mass of visionary leaders to steer the manufacturing sector into the new era of excellence.

Hence, VLMP was developed by the National Manufacturing Competitiveness Council in collaboration with the Ministry of HRD, IITs, IIMs, and CII as a flagship program to develop Leaders in Manufacturing under the Indo-Japan Cooperation Agreement, signed by Hon’ble Dr. Manmohan Singh, Prime Minister of India, and His Excellency Mr. Shinzo Abe, Prime Minister of Japan, in December 2006.

The Government of Japan had also agreed to extend cooperation to facilitate the transfer of Japanese expertise and encourage visits to manufacturing centers of excellence in Japan so as to expose the budding leaders to the pioneers of manufacturing technology, adding a global perspective to the entire effort. The program was structured under the guidance of Professor Shoji Shiba, a renowned international expert in the manufacturing sector and a recipient of the Deming Prize. Prof. Shiba has been associated for more than a decade with the very successful Leaders for Global Operations (LGO), erstwhile LFM, at the Massachusetts Institute of Technology (MIT), USA.

Since 2007, the program has crafted an array of visionary leaders who have marked their presence in the industry, upholding the broad principles of the VLFM community.

== Degree ==
A diploma will be awarded jointly by IIMC, IITK, and IITM. The diploma conferred is titled "Post Graduate Diploma in Management for Executives in Manufacturing" (PGDM for Executives in Manufacturing). This is equivalent to other PGDM degrees offered by all premier institutes in India.

== Eligibility criteria ==
=== Education ===
A First‐Class Graduate Engineer with First Division/ First Class Marks from SLC/ Madhyamik.

=== Work experience ===
Self-sponsored candidates, not in service. ‐ Minimum 4 1/2 to maximum 10 years of work experience in manufacturing, engineering and related sector; holding responsibilities in production planning and control, research, design and development, quality control, plant engineering, maintenance, supply chain, construction etc. Sponsored candidates and candidates on study leave need to have minimum 4 1/2 years work experience only. In these cases, there is no upper limit to experience.

== Selection process ==
Selection of the candidates will be made based on:

1. His/her academic background, which has to be consistently first division/first-class from high school board examination level to graduation level, and relevant work experience.
2. Employer's recommendations.
3. Bio-data and essays.
4. Performance in the Aptitude Test.
5. Personal interview to be conducted jointly by IIMC, IITK, and IITM.

The institute also welcomes GMAT scores to substantiate academic credentials.

== Course structure and content ==
The program unfolds in 8 terms through more than 1170 classroom contact hours, spread across 3 campuses during the 12-month period. It starts with an “Icebreaking session and Breakthrough Management” in IIM-Calcutta with a thrust on the "Big Picture" perspective. The primary focus lies on how to build a strategy based on core competencies and then to integrate the organization to execute this strategy and achieve the desired outcome.

The next two terms impart management knowledge in diverse areas ranging from Business Strategy, Marketing, Finance, Operations, People Management, and the Global Business scenario. Various modules on Supply Chain Management, Customer-centric approach, Lean methodologies, New Product Design & Development, SAP ERP, ISO 9001: Auditor training, and some high-end technology-related courses like Advanced Materials, Robotics, Ergonomics are being taught in IIT-Kanpur and IIT-Madras campuses.

The final term at IIM-Calcutta puts special emphasis on Leadership and Change Management with a key focus on building an Entrepreneurial and Innovative culture. The terms also stress the needs and nuances of Ethics and Ethical behavior for today's managers who compete in a rapidly globalizing world.

=== Learning methods ===
The program's learning methods are an assortment of regular class discussions, case studies, group work, live presentations, and action-learning opportunities like management games and short consultancy assignments. A significant proportion of the program is undertaken in teams to further enhance the dynamic learning experience.

=== Japan East Asia Network of Exchange for Students and Youths ===
“Japan East Asia Network of Exchange for Students and Youths, “ a.k.a. JENESYS, a multimillion-dollar initiative by the Japanese Government, was created to promote solidarity among the young generation of Asian countries. This unique opportunity to spend 10 days and experience the social life of Japan brings the students closer to the Japanese culture. They experience both urban and rural life and participate in various traditional activities like tea ceremonies, ikebana, and shamisen concerts. The journey also includes a two-day Home Stay with a Japanese family in one of the many prefectures.

==== Tsunami restoration work ====
Parts of Japan saw the devastating effects of the tsunami in 2011. Rikuzentakata was reported to have been "wiped off the map" by the tsunami following the Tohoku earthquake. The town's tsunami shelters were designed for a wave of three to four meters in height, but the tsunami of March 2011 created a wave 13 meters high which inundated the designated safe locations. Although the town was well prepared for earthquakes and tsunamis and had a 6.5-metre-high (21 ft) seawall, it was not enough, and more than 80% of 8,000 houses were swept away. Through the JENESYS program, the VLM students had the opportunity to visit the site at Rikuzentakata, where they supported the tsunami restoration work.
