= Chiyoda Corporation =

Japanese engineering company

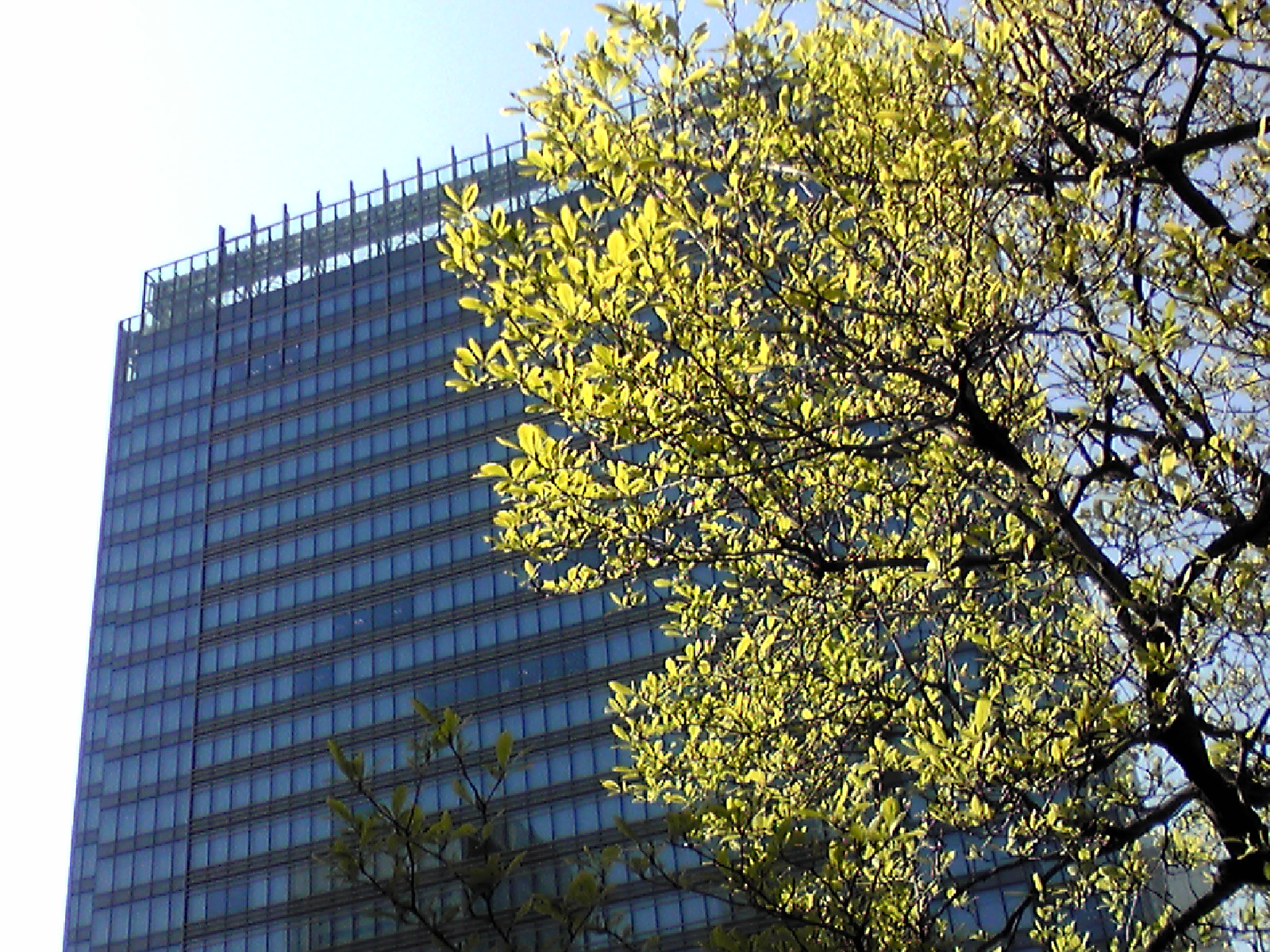
- Company headquarters building
- Native name: 千代田化工建設株式会社
- Company type: Public (K.K)
- Traded as: TYO: 6366
- ISIN: JP3528600004
- Industry: Construction
- Founded: January 20, 1948; 78 years ago
- Headquarters: Minatomirai Grand Central Tower, Minatomirai, Nishi-ku, Yokohama 220-8765, Japan
- Area served: Worldwide
- Key people: Koji Ota (President and CEO)
- Services: Engineering; Construction; Procurement; Feasibility studies
- Revenue: ▼JPY 603.7 billion (FY 2016) (US$ 5.56 billion) (FY 2016)
- Net income: ▼JPY 15.7 billion (FY 2016) (US$ 144.49 million) (FY 2016)
- Number of employees: 6,097 (as of March 31, 2015)
- Website: Official website

Chiyoda Corporation (千代田化工建設株式会社, Chiyoda Kakō Kensetsu Kabushiki-kaisha) is a global engineering company specialized in oil and gas midstream for gas processing and LNG, downstream refinery and petrochemicals facilities design and construction. Chiyoda is headquartered in Yokohoma, Japan with engineering offices abroad. The majority of Chiyoda's business takes place outside Japan, including the United States, Canada, Latin America, Middle East, African countries, Russia, FSU, South East Asia and Australia.

== History ==
Chiyoda was established as part of Mitsubishi Oil in 1948, and was spun off from its parent and went public in 1957.

In the late 1960s it built the Jeddah and Riyadh refineries in Saudi Arabia; at present its large projects include LNG plants in Qatar, the Sakhalin-II project in eastern Russia, and a variety of specialist-chemical and pharmaceutical plants in Japan itself.

It was, in 2005, the first engineering company in the world to be included in the FTSE4Good index of companies with exemplary corporate social responsibility.

=== Company Timeline ===
- 1948: Originally a construction division of Mitsubishi Oil, the company became independent and was established in Minato, Tokyo. Their first order was for a food oil and fat extraction system.
- 1949: Received their first order for an oil refining system (Koa Oil Thermal Cracking Unit).
- 1954: Opened an office in Osaka.
- 1957: The company went public with an over-the-counter listing.
- 1960: Secured a grassroots refinery project from Mitsubishi Oil (Mizushima).
- 1961: Listed on the Tokyo, Osaka, and Nagoya Stock Exchanges.
- 1966: Received an order for the Petromin (Jeddah) refinery in Saudi Arabia.
- 1968: Relocated the main office to Tsurumi-ku, Yokohama.
- 1972: Released the environmental declaration "Legacy for the 21st Century".
- 1973: Secured their first order for an LNG plant (Das Island in Abu Dhabi).
- 1984: Received their first order for the CT-121 flue gas desulfurization system in the United States.
- 1994: Established a design company in India. Conducted a third-party allotment capital increase in March.
- 1995: Established a design company in the Philippines.
- 1999: Awarded the "International Project of the Year" by the U.S. Project Management Institute (PMI) for the Qatar LNG project.
- 2000: Received the Global Environment Award. Announced a new rehabilitation plan.
- 2001: Implemented a capital reduction without compensation in February. Conducted a third-party allotment capital increase in March. Started full-scale expansion of the gas value chain.
- 2003: Delisted from the Nagoya Stock Exchange in January and the Osaka Stock Exchange in March. Received the Sakhalin II LNG project order. Achieved a year of no accidents or disasters on domestic projects.
- 2004: Achieved the new rehabilitation plan. Secured orders for the world's largest LNG plants in six sequences for Qatar Gas and RasGas, spanning into 2005.
- 2008: Celebrated the 60th anniversary of its foundation. Entered into a capital and business alliance with Mitsubishi Corporation.
- 2012: Moved the headquarters to the Minato Mirai Grand Central Tower in the Minato Mirai area in June (Chiyoda Chemical Construction Global Headquarters).
- 2017: In June, Masaji Santo, who had served as an executive officer of Mitsubishi Corporation, became the president. This marked the first time someone from Mitsubishi Corporation assumed the presidency of the company.
- 2019: On July 1, Mitsubishi Corporation carried out a third-party allotment capital increase, acquiring Type A preferred shares (175 million shares) for 70 billion yen. On August 1, due to excessive liabilities, the company was demoted to the Tokyo Stock Exchange's second section. It was also removed from the Nikkei Stock Average composition. On September 10, all the aforementioned Type A preferred shares became convertible into common shares, making the company a consolidated subsidiary of Mitsubishi Corporation.
- 2022: On April 1, President Masaji Santo stepped down to become a special advisor, and Chairman Masakazu Sakakida assumed the role of president.

== Industries ==
In pursuit of "Energy and Environment in Harmony", Chiyoda is an integrated engineering enterprise. Since its establishment in 1948, Chiyoda's business field has covered energy such as oil and gas industry and chemicals, environment, energy conservation, industrial facilities and life science.

Chiyoda now engages in numerous Engineering, Procurement and Construction (EPC) and other type of projects around the world.

For the past several years, Chiyoda has been very active in EPC projects in Americas with its wholly owned subsidiary Chiyoda International Corporation headquartered in Houston, TX.
