= Dynegy =

Electricity company based in Houston, Texas

Dynegy Inc.
- Dynegy logo
- Type: Subsidiary
- Traded as: NYSE: DYN
- Industry: Energy (electrical power industry)
- Founded: 1984; 42 years ago
- Headquarters: Houston, Texas, U.S.
- Area served: USA (six states)
- Key people: Pat Wood III (chairman); Rober C. Flexon (president and CEO); Clint C. Freeland (CFO); Martin W. Daley (COO)
- Products: Natural gas (discontinued after 2005); Electricity generation
- Revenue: ▲US$4.3 billion (2016)
- Operating income: ▼US$-640 million (2016)
- Net income: ▼US$-1.2 billion (2016)
- Total assets: ▲US$13 billion (2016)
- Total equity: ▼US$2 billion (2016)
- Number of employees: 2,489 (2017)
- Parent: Vistra Corp.

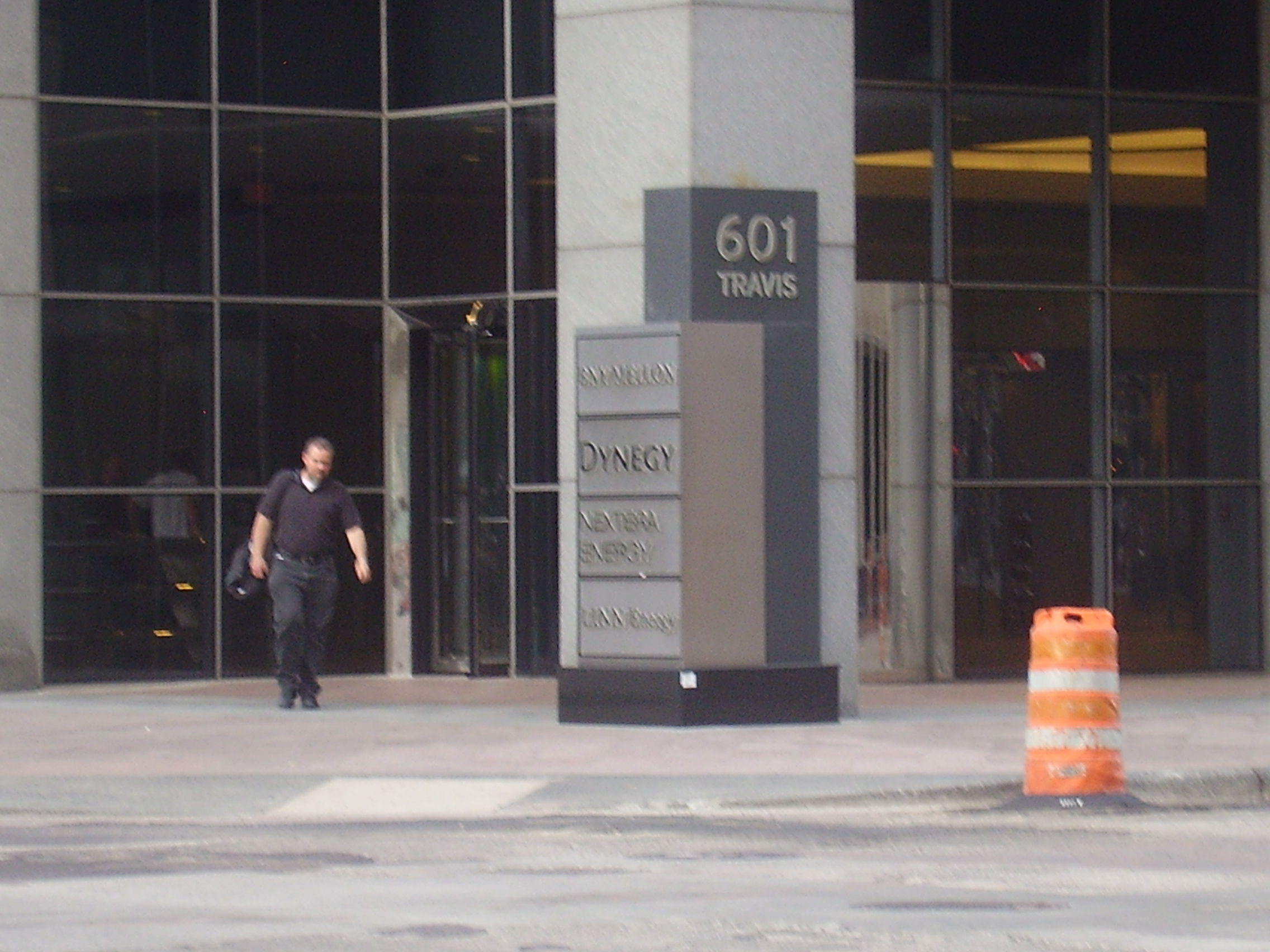
601 Travis houses the headquarters of Dynegy

Dynegy Inc. is an electric company based in Houston, Texas. It owns and operates a number of power stations in the U.S., all of which are powered by fossil fuels. Dynegy was acquired by Vistra Corp on April 9, 2018. The company is located at 601 Travis Street in Downtown Houston. The company was founded in 1984 as Natural Gas Clearinghouse. It was originally an energy brokerage, buying and selling natural gas supplies. It changed its name to NGC Corporation in 1995 after entering the electrical power generation business.

The company adopted the name Dynegy in 1998. Dynegy maintained a rivalry with the Houston-based Enron energy and trading firm, which it initially agreed to buy in 2001, before withdrawing from the deal as the extent of wrongdoing by Enron emerged.

Dynegy nearly went bankrupt in 2002, and several executives were eventually convicted of financial fraud and mismanagement. Dynegy exited the energy trading business in 2002 and the natural gas supply business in 2005, focusing its efforts on electrical generation. The company has one major subsidiary, Dynegy Holdings. It also has three operating subsidiaries: GasCo, CoalCo, and the "stub group" (for other miscellaneous business enterprises).

Dynegy Inc. was the subject of two unsuccessful takeover efforts in 2010. Its Dynegy Holdings subsidiary went bankrupt in November 2011, and Dynegy Inc. itself filed for bankruptcy protection on July 6, 2012. Its GasCo and CoalCo subsidiaries were unaffected by the bankruptcy filing. Dynegy emerged from bankruptcy on October 2, 2012. On April 9, 2018 Vistra Corp closed its acquisition of Dynegy following a determination by the Federal Energy Regulatory Commission that the $1.7 billion deal raised no competitive concerns.

== Corporate predecessors ==
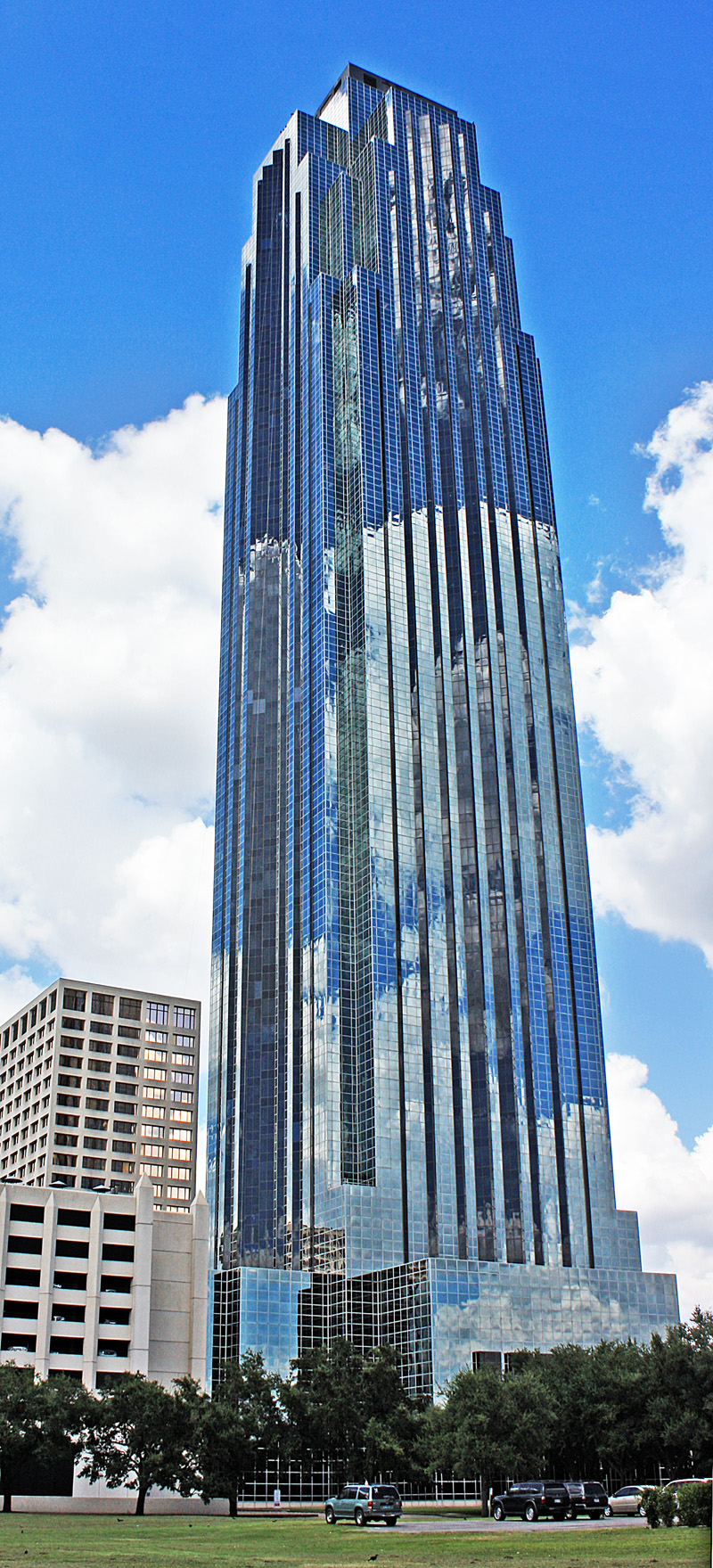
Transco Tower (now Williams Tower) in Houston, Dynegy's original headquarters in 1984

=== Natural Gas Clearinghouse ===
Natural Gas Clearinghouse (NGC) was created in 1985 by Charles Watson; a consortium of natural gas pipeline companies that included Transco; investment bank Morgan Stanley; and the legal firm of Akin Gump Strauss Hauer & Feld. A major investor was Kenneth Lay, later the chief executive officer of the energy firm Enron. Its first headquarters was on the 40th floor of the Transco Tower in Houston, Texas. NGC was so successful that in 1985 Morgan Stanley bought out some of the other investors and took a majority stake in the company.

NGC was purchased by Noble Affiliates, Inc. and Apache Corporation, independent oil and gas exploration and production companies, for a reported $50 million in 1989. In 1993, LG&E Energy Corporation took a stake in NGC, which by then was the largest independent natural gas marketing firm in the United States and had revenues of more than US$2 billion. NGC purchased Trident NGL in 1994 in a deal worth more than $750 million. That same year, it also established a partnership with Nova (also known as Novagas Clearinghouse, a natural gas marketing company based in Canada) and British Gas, which gave both companies a financial stake in NGC.

=== NGC Corporation ===
Natural Gas Clearinghouse shortened its name to NGC Corporation in 1995 after its merger with Trident NGL closed. It became a publicly traded company on the New York Stock Exchange that same year. By 1996, it had grown to US$550 million in assets, and carried US$525 million in long-term debt. NGC Corporation also established several subsidiaries to enable it to enter the electrical generation, marketing, and sales areas. Electric Clearinghouse sold electricity, and the Energy Store marketed it. In August 1996, it purchased the natural gas gathering, marketing, and processing operations of Chevron Corporation. The latter deal gave Chevron a 29 percent stake in NGC. NGC followed that deal by buying Destec Energy for US$1.27 billion. The deal required NGC Corporation to sell Destec's power generation subsidiaries in Australia, Canada, the Dominican Republic, the Netherlands, and the United Kingdom for US$407 million, although NGC Corporation retained Destec's 20 domestic gas-fired power plants.

== Dynegy history ==
=== Growth ===
In June 1998, NGC Corporation changed its name to Dynegy, Inc. The company's original slogan was "We believe in people." Nova announced two months later that it was seeking to sell its stake in Dynegy. Dynegy bought Illinova Corporation in 1999 in a deal worth US$1.75 billion and the assumption of US$2.25 billion of Illinova Corp. debt. The deal also allowed Nova and British Gas to sell their stake in Dynegy.

Dynegy also began branching into areas outside natural gas and electrical generation. In August 2000, the company announced that it had purchased Extant Inc., a broadband provider building a nationwide fiber optic network, for US$152.5 million.

Dynegy, along with Enron, El Paso Corporation, Reliant Energy, and several other energy companies, was accused of price manipulation and other fraudulent practices during the California electricity crisis in 2000 and 2001. The case against Dynegy was dismissed in 2003.

In 2001, Dynegy made a white knight US$8 billion takeover bid for Enron, which was saddled with $13 billion in debt and whose stock had plummeted. The deal began unraveling two weeks later as Enron revealed even larger financial losses and more debt than previously reported. Dynegy withdrew its merger offer on November 28. Enron sued Dynegy on December 2, the day after Enron declared bankruptcy. (The lawsuit was settled in August 2002 after Dynegy agreed to pay Enron US$25 million for backing out of the deal.) Enron attempted to sell off assets in an effort to stay afloat. On January 3, 2002, Dynegy successfully acquired Enron's Northern Natural Gas Company pipeline. NNGC was Enron's most lucrative pipeline asset and had been put up as collateral in return for Dynegy providing financing to Enron during merger talks.

=== Near-bankruptcy of 2002 ===
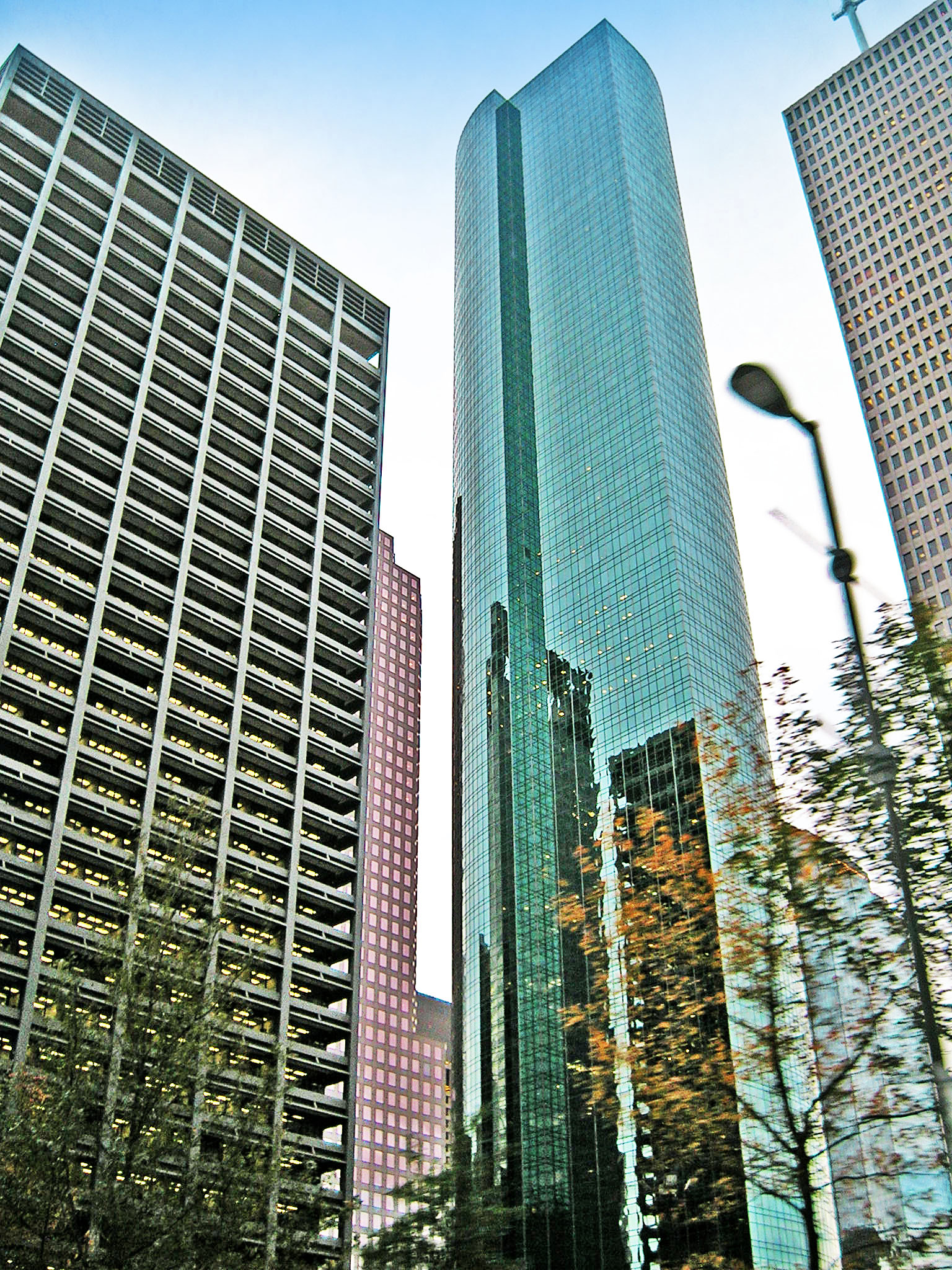
Wells Fargo Plaza in Houston, the headquarters of Dynegy as of 2011. The company moved out in 2012.

Dynegy came close to bankruptcy in 2002. Investor pressure on energy stocks in the wake of the Enron collapse pushed Dynegy's stock price down 42 percent by late April. The company also admitted on April 26 that it made a large accounting error on a fuel contract, which further depressed the stock price 22 percent. Moody's Investors Service announced it was reviewing all US$4 billion of Dynegy debt. In financial distress, Dynegy successfully applied for a US$900 million line of credit. On May 1, the U.S. Securities and Exchange Commission opened a formal investigation into how Dynegy's "Project Alpha", an internal corporate initiative that allegedly inflated income from natural gas transactions and illegally structured business partnerships to avoid income. Two weeks later, the New York Times reported that Dynegy's Illinova subsidiary was part of the investigation. Illinova had formed a joint partnership named Catlin in January 2000 with a little-known investment company named Black Thunder. Catlin took over some of Illinova's electrical generating assets. Although Black Thunder put up almost 90 percent of the money to form Catlin, Dynegy was required to buy out Black Thunder's investment or sell off the assets if Catlin did not earn a specified high rate of return. On May 28, Dynegy founder, president, and chief executive officer Charles Watson resigned. Dynegy Inc. chairman Dan Dienstbier was named interim CEO. In mid-June, Dynegy reported that its first quarter income had fallen 80 percent. It also admitted that it had signed long-term power contracts that would not produce revenue for years to come; but it had charged the income to the current year's revenues in an attempt to bolster its bottom line. On June 19, Dynegy's chief financial office, Rob Doty, resigned. The following day, Dynegy shut down its online energy trading system.

Dynegy was quickly approaching bankruptcy by late June 2002. On June 25, the company announced it would sell off assets in an attempt to raise US$2 billion in cash. Moody's downgraded the rating of the company's bonds to "junk" status on June 28. Dynegy announced it might need a financial partner to help it stabilize. After the July 23 announcement, the company's shares dropped 64 percent. Desperate for cash, Dynegy sold the Northern Natural Gas Company to MidAmerican Energy Holdings for $928 million on July 29 ($572 less than it paid for it). The sale saved Dynegy from bankruptcy.

Although Dynegy avoided bankruptcy, the fallout from the company's accounting practices continued throughout 2002. In August, former Dynegy controller and chief accounting officer Bradley P. Farnsworth sued the company, saying he'd been fired after refusing to help manipulate the company's financial statements in the summer of 2000. The company suspended its dividend on August 12. On September 3, interim chairman Glenn F. Tilton resigned in order to become chief executive officer of United Airlines. On September 24, Dynegy announced that it had agreed to pay a US$3 million fine for using the Catlin company and other business partnerships to hide losses and taxable income. It also admitted that it had engaged in "round-trip" trades, phony natural gas and electricity trades designed to mislead investors and other companies about the success of Dynegy's online trading operation. The company later fired five traders after the Commodity Futures Trading Commission (CFTC) discovered that Dynegy energy traders had supplied false prices to industry trade publications. The company later paid a US$5 million fine to the CFTC. Still needing cash, Dynegy sold its Hornsea natural gas storage site in the United Kingdom to help pay the fine.

Dynegy shuttered its online energy trading business for good on October 16, 2002. The closure led Dynegy to lay off 14 percent of its workforce, which left it with just 4,600 employees.

Several Dynegy executives were later convicted or indicted for their roles in Dynegy's near-collapse. In June 2003, Jamie Olis (former senior director of tax planning), Gene Foster (former vice president for taxation), and Helen Sharkey (a former employee in Dynegy's risk control and deal structure groups), were indicted on numerous counts of mail and wire fraud. According to court documents, the three employees conceived of a plan in early 2001 to borrow money but make it look like operational revenue. A corporation known as ABG Gas Supply was created. ABG secured loans from Citigroup, Credit Suisse First Boston, and Deutsche Bank to buy natural gas at market prices. ABG then sold this gas at a discount to Dynegy, which resold it at market prices and booked a $300 million profit. ABG then bought natural gas at market prices, and sold it at a premium to Dynegy. The profits ABG booked were then used to repay the loans. Prosecutors accused Olis, Foster, and Sharkey of deceiving auditors, regulators, and other company executives regarding the transactions. Foster and Sharkey pleaded guilty two months later. Olis was found guilty in March 2004, and sentenced to 24 years in prison. (A year later, after a U.S. Supreme Court ruling in a different case held that mandatory sentencing guidelines violated the Constitution, Olis' sentence was reduced to just six years in prison.) In December 2003, three former executives at Nicor Energy LLC (a joint venture of Dynegy and Nicor), were indicted for illegally manipulating that firm's income by US$11 million in 2001 to hide losses. Former chief financial officer Robert Doty agreed to pay a $376,650 fine in October 2007 for his role in helping to conceal the ABG Gas Supply scheme.

Shareholders, too, were unhappy with Dynegy's actions during the financial crisis. A class action lawsuit was filed against the company in 2002. In April 2005, Dynegy agreed to settle the lawsuit. Shareholders would be paid a total of US$468 million. To come up with the money, Dynegy paid out $250 million in cash and issued $68 million in stock to the plaintiffs. Its insurance companies paid another $150 million to the plaintiffs.

=== Recovery and restructuring ===
On October 23, 2002, Dynegy hired Bruce Williamson, a former Duke Energy executive, as its chief executive officer. Six weeks later, Dynegy hired Nick J. Caruso, a former chief financial officer at Royal Dutch Shell, as its new chief financial officer.

Williamson began a program of cost cutting, elimination of unprofitable businesses, and financial restructuring. As Williamson later told the New York Times in June 2005, "We had businesses in trading, in marketing, in broadband communications, in Europe, in communications as far as China. What we have done is very systematically sell those off, shut down offices and concentrate on the two businesses that looked like we had a competitive advantage." Dynegy sold its telecommunications business in Europe in January 2003, restated its income for 2001 and 2002, sold a natural gas terminal in Louisiana, sold its telecommunications business in North America in April 2003, engaged in a US$1.6 billion refinancing and other restructuring of its debt, sold its Illinois Power Company subsidiary to Ameren, and nullified a number of contracts in non-core or money-losing areas. In March 2004, Wiliamson was named chairman of the company, succeeding Dan Dienstbier (who retired).

Dynegy undertook a strategy to move into coal-fired and hydroelectric electrical generation in 2004, and out of natural gas distribution and trading. In November 2004, the company acquired four natural gas-fired and four hydroelectric power generation plants in the Northeast United States. In March 2005, it agreed to settle a 1999 dispute with the Environmental Protection Agency by spending US$321 million to repair and upgrade coal-fired generating plants in Illinois to reduce pollutants. In mid-2005, Dynegy hired Credit Suisse First Boston to assist it in finding a buyer for its natural gas transmission businesses. The sale of this business came quickly: In August 2005, Dynegy sold this business to Targa Resources, a company owned by private equity firm Warburg Pincus.

In September 2006, Dynegy and LS Power Group agreed to a joint venture in a deal worth US$2.3 billion. Under the terms of the agreement, Dynegy gave LS Power a 40 percent stake in Dynegy itself while LS Power contributed 10 of its power plants. Dynegy also agreed to create a 245 million new Class B shares, which it turned over to LS Power. In May 2007, ChevronTexaco announced it was selling its 12 percent stake in Dynegy to the public. The sale netted ChevronTexaco US$680 million by July. The joint venture did not last, however. In August 2009, LS Power agreed to buy nine electrical generating plants from Dynegy for US$1.025 billion in cash in order to dissolve the joint venture. Part of the reason for the joint venture's demise was another collapse in Dynegy's share price. Dynegy's shares fell 80 percent in the two years after the deal closed, and the company posted a large $345 million loss in the second quarter of 2009. LS Power also agreed to return all its Class B shares, so that Dynegy would only have 95 million shares of common stock outstanding. The dissolution of the joint venture left LS Power with a 15 percent stake in Dynegy.

Dynegy's move into coal-powered electrical generation was not without controversy. In September 2007, New York Attorney General Andrew Cuomo sued Dynegy and other utilities, arguing that the companies were not properly accounting for the financial risks that pollutants from coal-fired generating plants created. After a year of negotiations and legal maneuvering, Dynegy agreed to issue statements to its current and future investors warning that government regulation of carbon emissions and lawsuits over pollution could pose financial risks to the company. Its move into coal-fired electrical generation led the National Environmental Trust, an environmental group, to derisively call Dynegy the "king of coal" in 2008.

=== Takeover battles ===
On August 13, 2010, the Blackstone Group announced plans to purchase Dynegy for US$4.7 billion. As part of the deal, NRG Energy would acquire four natural gas plants in California and Maine for US$1.36 Billion. Seneca Capital, Dynegy's largest shareholder, fought the purchase in a proxy fight. Dynegy investor Carl Icahn also promised a proxy battle, arguing that Blackstone Group's offer was too low. Icahn raised his stake in Dynegy to 12.9 percent in preparation for the shareholder fight. Seneca Capital nominated former railroad executive E. Hunter Harrison and former energy company executive Jeff D. Hunter for the Dynegy board of directors, challenging Bruce Williamson and David Biegler (a Williamson ally).

A series of maneuvers followed. Dynegy executives said the offer was a good one, as the deal would give Dynegy access to lines of credit which would enable it to refinance and restructure its debt. With energy prices at cyclical lows, the company said it lacked the resources to do so and that its debt burden was destabilizing. Blackstone Group initially said it would not offer more than US$4.50 per share, but then revised its offer later that day to US$5.00 a share. Worried that it did not have enough shareholder support to accept the Blackstone Group offer, Dynegy proposed postponing its shareholder meeting a few days to November 23, but postponement did not occur. Legal counsel advised that Delaware law (under which Dynegy was incorporated) considered a postponement a new meeting, and that would require notifying shareholders (again) and giving at least 20 days' notice. Furthermore, Dynegy's proxy rules did not make it clear that a proxy remained in effect in the event of a postponement (which could lead to lawsuits). Legal counsel also believed that Dynegy management would be forced refile resolution with shareholders and resolicit votes, which would delay a meeting until early 2011. During the shareholder meeting, management's fears proved accurate. On November 19, Dynegy was forced to recess its shareholder meeting in an attempt to garner more support for the Blackstone bid. (Dynegy was unable to adjourn the meeting because its bylaws did not clearly provide for adjournment to another date, and because it was unclear that adjournment could occur without a shareholder vote—a vote the board felt it would lose.) During the four-day recess, Dynegy executives said the company would continue to solicit a takeover even if the Blackstone Group bid failed. On November 23, 2010, Dynegy management and Blackstone agreed to call off the takeover after it became clear there was not enough support for the US$5.00 a share bid.

On December 15, 2010, Icahn offered a US$5.50 a share cash bid for Dynegy. Dynegy's board asked for other bids, but none emerged. But Icahn, too, found little support among shareholders. He extended his offer by two weeks on January 25, 2011. That same day, Seneca Capital said it would not even entertain a US$6.00 a share bid. Dynegy's board urged shareholders to accept the Icahn bid, or risk bankruptcy. But by mid-February, even those investors willing to accept the Icahn bid had rescinded these offers. Icahn extended his offer by few days. The Icahn bid, too, collapsed.

On February 20, 2011, Bruce Williamson resigned as Dynegy's chairman, and announced he would step down as chief executive officer on March 11. Chief financial officer Holli C. Nichols also said she would resign as chief financial officer on March 11 as well. Board member Thomas W. Elward was named interim chairman, and Robert C. Flexon was appointed interim president and chief executive officer. Harrison was elected to the board of directors. Also elected to the board were Vincent J. Intrieri, Senior Managing Director of Icahn Capital, and Samuel J. Merksamer, an investment analyst for Icahn Capital.

== 2012 bankruptcy ==
The takeover bids all came after one of Dynegy's largest subsidiaries filed for bankruptcy. On November 7, 2011 Dynegy Holdings, the largest of Dynegy Inc.'s four subsidiaries, filed for Chapter 11 bankruptcy protection.

The bankruptcy was a novel one. Dynegy had structured itself so that Dynegy Inc. (the holding company) had little debt. Nearly all the debt was held by its subsidiary, Dynegy Holdings, which also guaranteed debt for the operating divisions. Dynegy Inc. created three operating divisions: the natural gas group (GasCo), the coal group (CoalCo), and a group for all other businesses (known as "the stub group"). GasCo and CoalCo were structured so that they would be little affected by any bankruptcy filing by either Dynegy Inc. or Dynegy Holdings. Part of the structure meant that few of the natural GasCo's and CoalCo's dividends were given to Dynegy Holdings. To separate Dynegy Holdings from Dynegy Inc., Dynegy Holdings was transformed from a corporation into a limited liability company (LLC). This legal maneuver took advantage of a Delaware Supreme Court ruling which made it difficult for creditors to sue an LLC's board of directors for failing to uphold their fiduciary duty. Finally, GasCo and CoalCo sold themselves to Dynegy Inc., which left Dynegy Holdings holding US$1.25 billion in debt but without the ability to seize the assets of GasCo and CoalCo in the event of a default. Under the structure adopted by Dynegy Inc., the company could meet its debt obligations to Dynegy Holdings by paying cash or by forgiving debt. This provided an incentive for Dynegy Inc. to withhold payment and force Dynegy Holdings to declare bankruptcy (thereby reducing the value of the debt and making it easier to pay off).

The restructuring plan put Dynegy's assets which had the worst financial performance into the hands of Dynegy Holdings. The goal was to protect Dynegy's secured creditors at the expense of its unsecured creditors. The plan had already generated one lawsuit. In 2011, U.S. Bancorp, representing bondholders whose investment was secured by leases of two Dynegy power plants new Newburgh, New York (the Danskammer Generating Station and the Roseton Generating Station).

On March 8, 2011, Dynegy submitted financial filings with government regulators warning investors that it faced bankruptcy if it could not restructure its debt. The company announced a month later that it had hired the restructuring firm Lazard and the law firm White & Case to advise it on debt restructuring. Vincent Intrieri was named chair of the boards finance and restructuring committee.

On March 9, 2012, the November 2011 bankruptcy of Dynegy Holdings ran into difficulty. An examiner appointed by the United States bankruptcy court found that the Dynegy Inc.'s purchase of CoalCo was fraudulent. The examiner found that Dynegy Holdings was already bankrupt at the time the sale took place, and therefore constituted a breach of fiduciary duty by the Dynegy Holdings board of directors. This allowed the Dynegy Holdings board of directors to sue the Dynegy Inc. board of directors for damages (which could run into the billions of dollars). This threw the Dynegy Holdings bankruptcy filing into doubt, and put Dynegy Inc. on the hook for billions in debt. The bankruptcy court trustee said she would sue on behalf of Dynegy Holdings to recover these debts.

The bankruptcy court examiner's finding quickly led to the bankruptcy of Dynegy Inc. itself. On April 3, 2012, Dynegy Inc. announced that it had reached an agreement with the U.S. bankruptcy trustee, the board of directors of Dynegy Holdings, and its other creditors. The agreement, which affected US$2.25 billion in debt, gave all creditors 99 percent of the stock of Dynegy Inc. once it emerged from bankruptcy. Existing shareholders would get just 1 percent of the stock in the new company, with warrants enabling them to buy up to 13.5 of common stock at a set price over the next five years. Accordingly, Dynegy Inc. filed for Chapter 11 bankruptcy protection on July 5, 2012. The bankruptcy plan filed by Dynegy Inc. also called for a merger with Dynegy Holdings. The bankruptcy filing did not, however, affect GasCo, CoalCo, or the "stub group", and allowed the Dynegy Holdings bankruptcy to proceed. Dynegy's stock was delisted from the New York Stock Exchange following the bankruptcy filing. U.S. Bancorp agreed to drop its lawsuit against the company in exchange for a $540 million claim against the company in bankruptcy court. The bondholders represented by U.S. Bancorp would also get a further US$31 million if the Danskammer and Roseton plants are sold.

As part of its bankruptcy filing, Dynegy moved its corporate headquarters. In November 2011, the company signed a lease for new principal offices in an office building at 601 Travis Street in Houston. (It occupied these quarters early July 2012.) Dynegy continued to hold leases on several floors of the Wells Fargo Plaza, however. As part of its bankruptcy filing, the bankruptcy court approved a new lease in which Dynegy would abandon 130,000 square feet (12,000 m^{2}) of space at Wells Fargo Plaza. The company asked the court to cancel its lease on the remaining 50,000 square feet (4,600 m^{2}) as well.

Dynegy said it hoped to hold a vote on August 24, at which time its creditors would approve the bankruptcy plan. A court hearing on the creditor-approved bankruptcy plan would then be held September 5, after which the company said it would emerge from bankruptcy protection.

Dynegy Inc. posted a second-quarter 2012 loss of $1.06 billion, an increase to $8.65 per share from 95 cents per share a year ago. The company blamed, among other things, markedly lower demand for its electricity, much lower prices for its coal, and a $941 million noncash loss caused by the transfer of its coal unit to Dynegy Holdings. The company also said it now hoped to emerge from bankruptcy in September 2012.

Dynegy agreed to auction off its Roseton and Danskammer energy plants in New York state in order to emerge from bankruptcy. Dynegy had signed a sale-leaseback agreement in 2001 with Public Services Enterprise Group for the Roseton and Danskammer facilities. Fifty percent of the proceeds from the auction would be used to pay bondholders (up to $571 million), while the remaining 50 percent would be used to pay unsecured creditors. The unsecured creditors would get $200 million in cash. Unsecured creditors also would receive 99 percent of Dynegy's new stock, with the company retaining the rest (with warrants to purchase 13.5 percent of the stock after five years). Dynegy also agreed to pay holders of $206 million in subordinated capital income securities just $55 million in principal and $16 million in interest to settle their claims. The bankruptcy agreement also settled claims between Dynegy Holdings and Dynegy, Inc.

Dynegy emerged from bankruptcy on October 2, 2012, and its shares began trading on October 3 under the "DYN" symbol.

== Post-bankruptcy ==
On November 5, 2012, the Federal Energy Regulatory Commission settled a decade-old lawsuit which alleged that Dynegy had manipulated the California energy market. While the lawsuit continued, Dynegy sold its California subsidiary to NRG Energy, Inc. NRG Energy subsequently agreed to pay $20 million in refunds to consumers as well as spend more than $100 million to install 200 public fast-charging electric vehicle stations and 10,000 plug-in stations throughout California. Twenty percent of the stations were required to be in low-income neighborhoods.

On January 4, 2013, Dynegy's Chief Operating Officer, Kevin Howell, resigned. Howell continued as a consultant to the company, and agreed to stay on until a successor was named in order to provide an orderly transition.

On February 2, 2013, Dynegy's South Bay Power Plant in San Diego, California, was imploded. The demolition of the 165-foot (50 m) smokestacks of the outmoded plant was watched by more than 1,000 people.

=== Roseton and Danskammer sales ===
The sale of the Roseton and Danskammer plants—a condition of Dynegy's emergence from bankruptcy—proceeded slowly. On November 8, 2012, members of International Brotherhood of Electrical Workers (IBEW) Local 320 struck the Roseton and Danskammer plants after a contract extension expired and Dynegy continued to seek cuts in retirement benefits. Dynegy's bankruptcy also left $17 million in unpaid property taxes in Orange County, New York. This created a budget crisis in the county which threatened to close local schools in Ulster County and create severe cutbacks in Orange County services. On December 10, 2012, Dynegy announced it would sell the Roseton plant to Louis Dreyfus Highbridge Energy for $19.5 million in cash. The sale closed on April 30, 2013.

The Danskammer plant sale was far more troubled. The plant was heavily damaged by Hurricane Sandy in October 2012, rendering it inoperable. On December 10, Dynegy said that ICS NY Holdings would buy the plant for $3.5 million and demolish it. But the ICS sale stalled. Under the terms of the auction, ICS NY had to replace or find a substitute for its credit support agreement, and pay its portion of the plant's outstanding property taxes. But, Dynegy said, the company never did either. ICS defended itself, saying it was making every economically feasible effort to replace the credit agreement. On May 25, 2013, Dynegy filed suit with the bankruptcy court to force ICA to fulfill its obligations. The court imposed a July 31 deadline for ICS to close the sale, but it did not meet the deadline. Dynegy subsequently sought another buyer. Helios Power Capital, a private equity firm, agreed to purchase the plant for $3.5 million in cash on August 20. The court approved the sale on September 2.

=== Ameren purchase ===
In mid-March 2013, Dynegy purchased three electric generating subsidiaries of Ameren, an Illinois power company. The deal, worth $900 million, involved Ameren's Ameren Energy Generating Co. (Genco); Genco's controlling interest in Electric Energy Inc.; AmerenEnergy Resources Generating Co.; and Ameren Energy Marketing Co. Dynegy formed a subsidiary, Illinois Power Holdings (IPH), to purchase the Ameren subsidiaries. No cash changed hands; rather, IPH agreed to assume $825 million in debt owed by Genco and the other subsidiaries. Ameren also transferred about $180 million in tax benefits the three subsidiaries would have received in 2015. Ameren retained Genco's inactive Hutsonville and Meredosia plants, and agreed to buy back from IPH for $133 million three natural gas electrical generating plants. Dynegy agreed to honor the union collective bargaining agreements in force at all plants. Under the deal, Dynegy acquired five coal-fired generating plants: Coffeen in Coffeen, Illinois; Duck Creek in Canton, Illinois; E.D. Edwards in Bartonville, Illinois; Joppa in Joppa, Illinois; and Newton in Newton, Illinois.

As the deal worked its way through state and federal regulatory approval, Dynegy took advantage of low interest rates and refinanced its debt. The company obtained $1.3 billion in term loan B facilities and $500 million in revolving credit. The company used this income to retire an $800 million, seven-year line of credit and a $500 million, two-year line of credit. Dynegy agreed that the revolving credit line would be paid off and terminate within five years. Two syndicated loans made up the $1.3 billion loan package. The $800 million loan and the $500 million loan were both due in 2020. This left Dynegy with $1.28 billion in lines of credit and $500 million in outstanding bonds.

The Ameren plants-for-debt swap also ran into trouble. The Federal Energy Regulatory Commission (FERC) had to approve the deal and ensure that there was no negative impact on consumers from Dynegy's expanding market share in the Midwest. But on April 16, FERC said that the studies submitted by Dynegy and Ameren were inadequate, and it ordered the two firms to rerun the studies and report back to FERC by July 14. On July 16, FERC again declined to approve or disapprove the Dynegy-Ameren deal. The agency said that it Dynegy's study showed it charging market rates for energy in the Midwest. But FERC said it worried that transmission bottlenecks in the area would permit Dynegy to charge much more. Furthermore, federal regulators were considering an expansion in the market area IPH could serve. FERC asked Dynegy to provide additional information on transmission limitations and market area expansion. In August, the Sierra Club formally filed opposition to the Dynegy-Ameren deal. The environmental group said the transmission bottleneck issue gave Dynegy too much market power. It also argued that Dynegy and Ameren had submitted only regional market power data, and had not accounted for local impacts (which could be very severe).

Another obstacle emerged on June 6. Ameren was required to install pollution-reducing equipment on its five coal-fired generating plants in 2015. But because Ameren was in financial difficulty, it sought and received a waiver from the state of Illinois granting it a five-year delay. Ameren sought to transfer this delay to Dynegy, so that Dynegy would not have to immediately install the devices until 2020, either. But the Illinois Pollution Control Board denied Ameren's request. Dynegy filed its own request for a five-year waiver in July, and warned that the Ameren deal would fall apart if it did not receive the waiver. But the Sierra Club, the Environmental Law and Policy Center, and other environmental groups said Dynegy had the resources to install the equipment, and opposed a waiver. ACM Partners, a financial firm hired by the Sierra Club, also argued that Dynegy purposefully left IPH significantly underfunded and unable to tap into the parent company's resources. Dynegy disagreed, but the firm warned that if IPH went bankrupt, workers would lose pensions and local communities would have to pay for any environmental remediation. The Illinois AFL-CIO, however, supported Dynegy's request on September 16, saying that local jobs depended on the waiver. The pollution board said it would make a decision by November 2013. Foresight Energy, a major Illinois coal mining company, said it would install the $500 million anti-pollution devices for free if Dynegy agreed to sign a long-term contract to accept coal only from Foresight Energy. Dynegy declined the offer (in part because it already has long-term coal contracts), and environmental groups opposed it.

There was some speculation by financial analysts that the Dynegy-Ameren deal was a poor one. Julien Dumoulin-Smith, executive director of UBS Investment Research, said Dynegy is far more likely to shutter all five coal-powered plants rather than add pollution control devices. Dumoulin-Smith said that the United States Environmental Protection Agency (EPA) issued final rules on sulfur dioxide emissions that go into effect in July 2018. Because the Edwards plant is in an area of low air quality, EPA is likely to force Dynegy to close the plant anyway. The remaining four plants are borderline cases with the exception of Duck Creek Station which spent nearly US$800m on sulfur dioxide removal, and may also be forced to close if EPA regulations tighten in the future (a highly likely possibility, he said).

=== 2014 acquisitions ===
On August 22, 2014, Dynegy announced a deal involving two interdependent transactions to be executed simultaneously. Dynegy acquired Duke’s Midwest Generation assets and retail business for $2.8 billion in cash, and the power generating assets of EquiPower Resources for $3.45 billion, with $3.35 billion in cash and $100 million in stock. This increased the company's generating capacity from 13000 MW to nearly 26000 MW.

=== Acquisition by Vistra ===
On April 9, 2018, Vistra Corp closed its acquisition of Dynegy following a FERC determination that the $1.7 billion deal raised no competitive concerns.

=== 2021 Lawsuit ===
In June 2021, the Attorney General of Illinois filed a lawsuit against Dynegy claiming that the company polluted groundwater with contaminants from coal ash.
