= National Register of Historic Places listings in Vinton County, Ohio =

Location of Vinton County in Ohio

This is a list of the National Register of Historic Places listings in Vinton County, Ohio.

This is intended to be a complete list of the properties on the National Register of Historic Places in Vinton County, Ohio, United States. The locations of National Register properties for which the latitude and longitude coordinates are included below, may be seen in an online map.

There are 11 properties listed on the National Register in the county.

This National Park Service list is complete through NPS recent listings posted March 14, 2025.

== Current listings ==
	Name on the Register	Image	Date listed	Location	City or town	Description
1	Eakin Mill Covered Bridge	Eakin Mill Covered Bridge	March 16, 1976 (#76001539)	Mound Hill Rd. north of Arbaugh; 39°10′16″N 82°20′13″W	Vinton Township	
2	Hope Furnace	Hope Furnace	May 25, 1973 (#73001546)	5 miles northeast of Zaleski on State Route 278; 39°19′55″N 82°20′25″W	Brown Township	
3	Markham Mound		May 3, 1974 (#74001640)	Address Restricted	Zaleski	
4	Masonic Lodge No. 472	Masonic Lodge No. 472	March 9, 2000 (#00000182)	18 Commercial St. 39°16′56″N 82°23′37″W	Zaleski	
5	Moonville Tunnel	Moonville Tunnel	March 22, 2021 (#100006291)	Hope-Moonville Rd., 2 miles (3.2 km) southwest of Lake Hope State Park; 39°18′26″N 82°19′20″W	Zaleski vicinity	
6	Mt. Olive Road Covered Bridge	Mt. Olive Road Covered Bridge	October 8, 1976 (#76001538)	1 mile northeast of Allensville on Mt. Olive Rd. 39°17′10″N 82°35′21″W	Jackson Township	
7	Ponn Humpback Covered Bridge	Ponn Humpback Covered Bridge	April 11, 1973 (#73001545)	4 miles southwest of Wilkesville over Raccoon Creek; 39°02′52″N 82°22′35″W	Wilkesville Township	Built in 1874 to replace an arsoned structure; arsoned in 2013
8	Ranger Station Mound	Ranger Station Mound	July 15, 1974 (#74001641)	Entrance to Zaleski State Forest; 39°17′14″N 82°23′42″W	Zaleski	
9	Ratcliffe Mound	Ratcliffe Mound	August 28, 1975 (#75001548)	5 miles northeast of Londonderry on State Route 327; 39°18′27″N 82°43′32″W	Eagle Township	
10	Trinity Episcopal Church	Trinity Episcopal Church	March 16, 1976 (#76001540)	Sugar and High Sts. 39°14′51″N 82°28′49″W	McArthur	
11	Zaleski Methodist Church Mound	Zaleski Methodist Church Mound	July 15, 1974 (#74001642)	114 Broadway St. 39°17′02″N 82°23′44″W	Zaleski	

== See also ==
- List of National Historic Landmarks in Ohio
- Listings in neighboring counties: Athens, Gallia, Hocking, Jackson, Meigs, Ross
- National Register of Historic Places listings in Ohio
