= Ohio State Route 160 =

State highway in southeastern Ohio, US

State Route 160

Route information
- Maintained by ODOT
- Length: 38.82 mi (62.47 km)
- Existed: 1926–present

Major junctions
- South end: SR 7 in Gallipolis
- US 35 / CR 6 near Gallipolis
- North end: SR 93 in Hamden

Location
- Country: United States
- State: Ohio
- Counties: Gallia, Vinton

Highway system
- Ohio State Highway System; Interstate; US; State; Scenic
← SR 159	→ SR 161

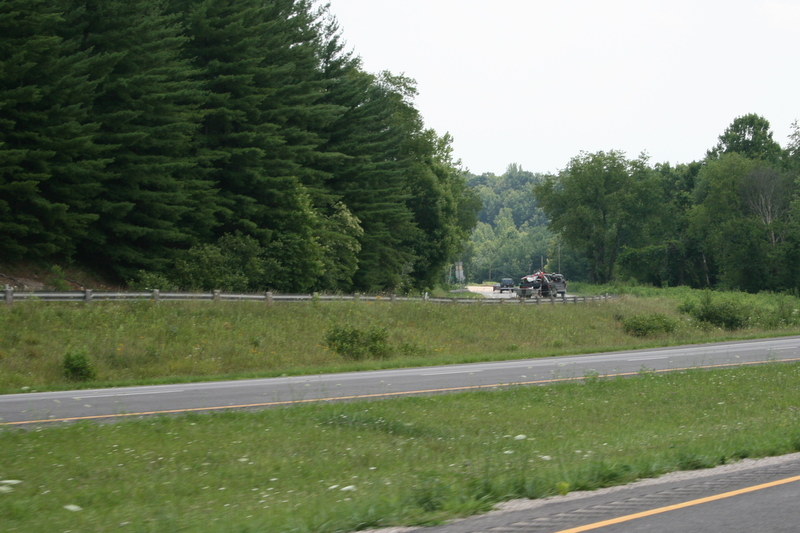
A view of SR 160 as it winds south through the trees toward Wilkesville from SR 32

State Route 160 (SR 160) is a north–south state highway in the southeastern portion of the U.S. state of Ohio. Its southern terminus is at SR 7 in Gallipolis, and the route heads north. It meets U.S. Route 35 at an interchange with various collector and distributor ramps. SR 160 southbound bypasses the interchange on a 0.739-mile-long (1.189 km) road officially designated SR 160-A. From there, the route passes through Vinton in northern Gallia County. Following an intersection with SR 32, the route heads in a more westerly direction until it meets and its northern terminus is at State Route 93 in Hamden.

== History ==
=== 1926 ===
Original route certified; routed from 3 miles (4.8 km) north of Gallipolis to Hamden along the previous alignment of State Route 142 from 3 miles (4.8 km) north of Gallipolis to 4 miles (6.4 km) north of Radcliff, and along a previously unnumbered road from 4 miles (6.4 km) north of Radcliff to Hamden.

=== 1970 ===
Extended south to Gallipolis along the previous alignment of U.S. Route 35 (which was the former State Route 11 before 1926).

== Major intersections ==
County	Location	mi	km	Destinations	Notes
Gallia	Gallipolis	0.00	0.00	SR 7 (Second Avenue) / Pine Street – Pomeroy, Crown City, Point Pleasant, W.Va.	
Gallia	Gallipolis–Green township line	2.31– 3.06	3.72– 4.92	US 35 / CR 6 (McCormick Road) – Charleston, W.Va., Jackson	Interchange; no access from eastbound US 35; from southbound SR 160 to westbound US 35
Gallia	Springfield Township	3.57– 3.70	5.75– 5.95	US 35 west – Jackson	Interchange; eastbound US 35 exit / westbound US 35 entrance only
Gallia	Springfield Township	9.68	15.58	SR 554 – Bidwell, Cheshire	
Gallia	Vinton	15.21	24.48	SR 325 north / Scenic Drive	Southern end of SR 325 concurrency
Gallia	Vinton	15.46	24.88	SR 325 south / Van Buren Street	Northern end of SR 325 concurrency
Vinton	Wilkesville	23.47	37.77	SR 124 east (Rutland Street) / Mill Street – Rutland, Pomeroy	Southern end of SR 124 concurrency
Vinton	Wilkesville	23.74	38.21	SR 124 west – Jackson	Northern end of SR 124 concurrency
Vinton	Wilkesville Township	24.46	39.36	SR 689 north – Albany	Southern terminus of SR 689
Vinton	Vinton Township	28.97	46.62	SR 32 (James A. Rhodes Appalachian Highway) – Wellston, Athens	
Vinton	Clinton Township	33.71	54.25	SR 324 north – Dundas	Southern terminus of SR 324
Vinton	Clinton Township	38.21	61.49	SR 349 south – Wellston	Northern terminus of SR 349
Vinton	Hamden	38.82	62.47	SR 93 (Main Street) – Wellston, McArthur	
1.000 mi = 1.609 km; 1.000 km = 0.621 mi: Concurrency terminus; Incomplete access
