= Vinton County High School =

Location
- 63910 US Highway 50; McArthur, Ohio 45651; United States; 39.250866°N 82.49325°W

Information
- Funding type: Public
- Established: 1966
- School district: Vinton County Local Schools
- CEEB code: 363305
- NCES School ID: 390503903933
- Principal: Megan Sowers
- Teaching staff: 40.60 (FTE)
- Grades: 9–12
- Gender: Coeducational
- Enrollment: 565 (2024–2025)
- Student to teacher ratio: 12.17
- Campus: Rural
- Colors: Maroon and white
- Athletics conference: Tri-Valley Conference
- Team name: Vikings
- Accreditation: Ohio Department of Education
- Feeder schools: Vinton County Middle School

Vinton County High School is a public high school in Elk Township, just outside the village limits of McArthur, Ohio, United States. It is the only high school in the Vinton County Local School District. Athletic teams are known as the Vikings.

== History ==
Vinton County High School was formed after all of the other schools consolidated into one high school.

School	Nickname	Location
Allensville/Richland Rural High School	Bombers	Allensville, Ohio
Brown-Zaleski High School	Bobcats	Zaleski, Ohio
Hamden High School	Engineers	Hamden, Ohio
McArthur High School	Generals	McArthur, Ohio
Wilton High School	Jets	Wilkesville, Ohio
Vinton Rural/Wilton North High School	Tigers	Radcliff, Ohio

== Notable alumni and faculty ==
- Dick Bates, Major League Baseball pitcher
- Thomas S. Crow, Master Chief Petty Officer of the Navy

== Athletics ==
The Vikings belong to the Ohio High School Athletic Association (OHSAA) and the Tri-Valley Conference, a 16-member athletic conference located in southeastern Ohio. The conference is divided into two divisions based on school size. The Ohio Division features the larger schools, including Vinton County, and the Hocking Division features the smaller schools.

== See also ==
- Ohio High School Athletic Conferences
