= Ohio State Route 671 =

State highway in Vinton County, Ohio, US

State Route 671

Route information
- Maintained by ODOT
- Length: 4.58 mi (7.37 km)
- Existed: 1939–present

Major junctions
- West end: SR 327 near Londonderry
- East end: US 50 in Ratcliffburg

Location
- Country: United States
- State: Ohio
- Counties: Vinton

Highway system
- Ohio State Highway System; Interstate; US; State; Scenic
← SR 670	→ SR 672

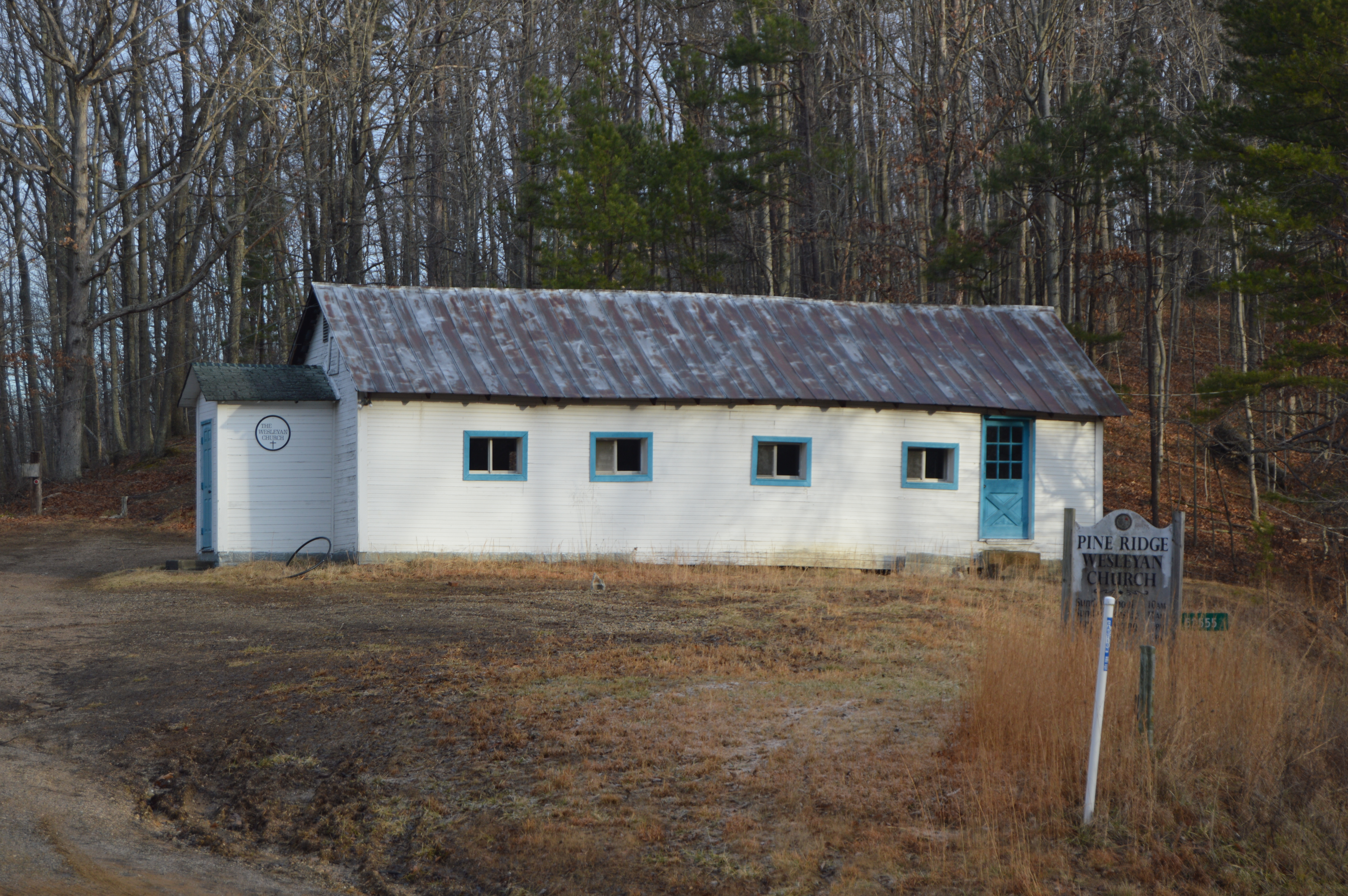
Pine Ridge Wesleyan Church, near the highway's western end

State Route 671 (SR 671) is an east–west state highway in the southern portion of Ohio. Existing entirely within Vinton County, the western terminus of this short connector route is at SR 327 three miles (4.8 km) northeast of the hamlet of Londonderry. Its eastern terminus is at U.S. Route 50 (US 50) in the unincorporated community of Ratcliffburg.

== Route description ==
Starting from a T-intersection with SR 327 in Eagle Township just inside of the Ross-Vinton county line, where SR 327 forms the western and northern legs of the intersection, SR 671 heads easterly across the Salt Creek and through grassland through the Dixon Mill Road intersection, where it then turns to the southeast into primarily forested terrain. The highway passes back-to-back T-intersections with two unpaved roads, Fout Road and State Ford Road, while continuing to trend southeasterly through the woods to the point where it comes to an end in the Harrison Township hamlet of Ratcliffburg at a T-intersection with US 50.

== History ==
SR 671 was originally designated in 1939 along the routing that it currently occupies between SR 327 and US 50. No major changes have taken place to the highway since it was certified.

== Major intersections ==
The entire route is in Vinton County.

Location	mi	km	Destinations	Notes
Eagle Township	0.00	0.00	SR 327	
Harrison Township	4.58	7.37	US 50 – McArthur, Chillicothe	
1.000 mi = 1.609 km; 1.000 km = 0.621 mi
