= Vinton County, Ohio =

County in Ohio, United States

- County
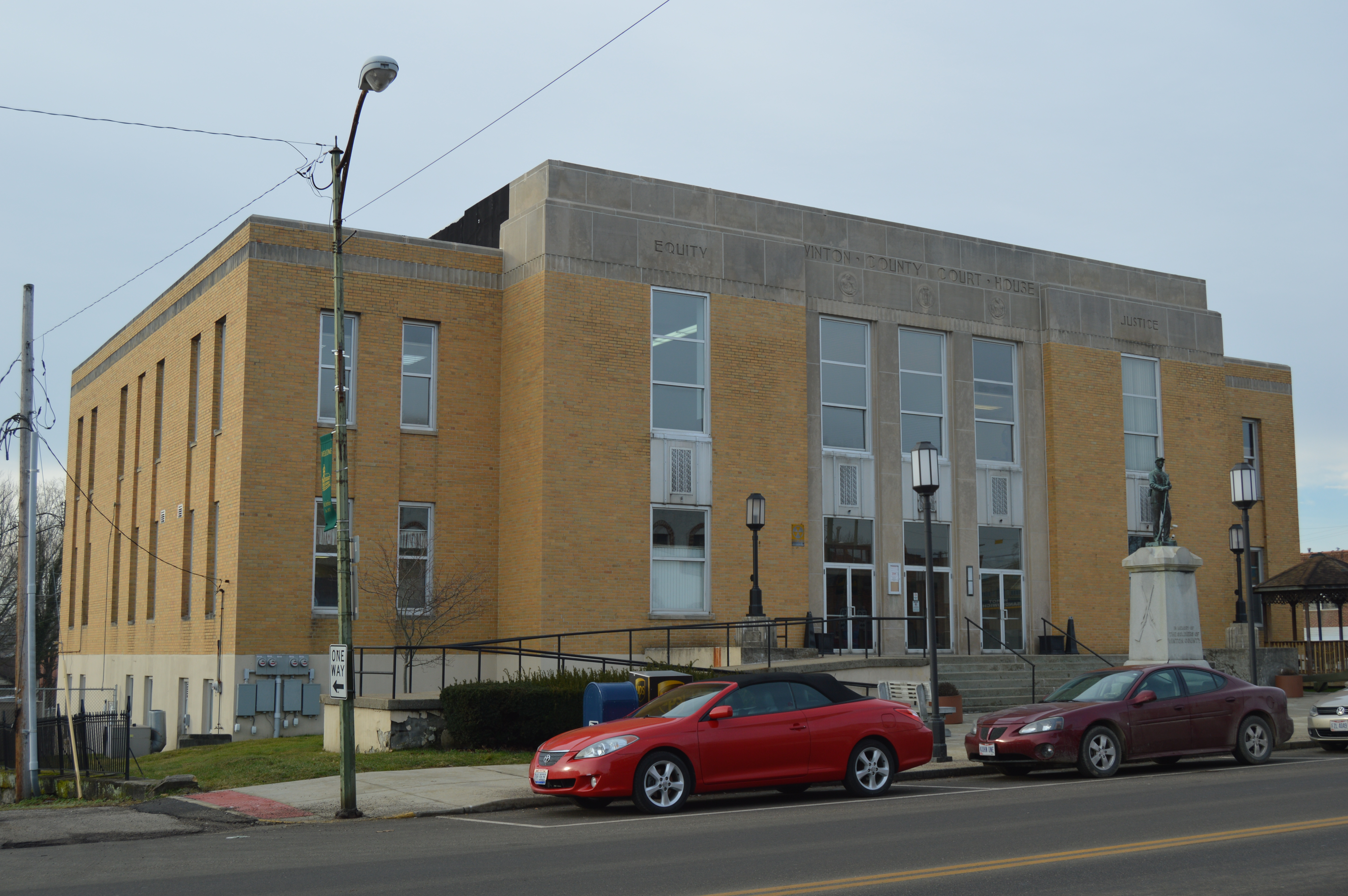
- Vinton County Courthouse in McArthur

- Flag Seal

- Location within the U.S. state of Ohio
- Coordinates: 39°15′N 82°29′W
- Country: United States
- State: Ohio
- Founded: March 23, 1850
- Named for: Samuel Finley Vinton
- Seat: McArthur
- Largest village: McArthur

Area
  - Total: 415 sq mi (1,070 km^{2})
  - Land: 412 sq mi (1,070 km^{2})
  - Water: 2.6 sq mi (6.7 km^{2}) 0.6%

Population (2020)
  - Total: 12,800
  - Estimate (2025): 12,645 ▼
  - Density: 31.1/sq mi (12.0/km^{2})
- Time zone: UTC−5 (Eastern)
  - Summer (DST): UTC−4 (EDT)
- Congressional district: 2nd
- Website: http://www.vintoncounty.com/

Vinton County is a county located in the U.S. state of Ohio. As of the 2020 census, the population was 12,800, making it the least populous county of Ohio. Its county seat is McArthur. The county is named for Samuel Finley Vinton, a US Representative from Ohio (1823–1837, 1843–1851).

== History ==
Vinton County was formed on March 23, 1850, with land from Athens, Gallia, Hocking, Jackson, and Ross counties, and was named after Samuel Finley Vinton. At the same time, Vinton County had at least four iron furnaces producing iron. In 1926, Maude Collins became the first female sheriff in Ohio.

== Geography ==
According to the United States Census Bureau, the county has a total area of 415 square miles (1,070 km^{2}), of which 412 square miles (1,070 km^{2}) is land and 2.6 square miles (6.7 km^{2}) (0.6%) is water.

=== Waterways ===
Most of Vinton County is in the Raccoon Creek watershed. Most of the rest of the county, to the west, is in the Salt Creek watershed.

=== Adjacent counties ===
- Hocking County (north)
- Athens County (northeast)
- Meigs County (east)
- Gallia County (southeast)
- Jackson County (south)
- Ross County (west)

== Demographics ==
Historical population
Census	Pop.	Note	%±
1850	9,353		—
1860	13,631		45.7%
1870	15,027		10.2%
1880	17,223		14.6%
1890	16,045		−6.8%
1900	15,330		−4.5%
1910	13,096		−14.6%
1920	12,075		−7.8%
1930	10,287		−14.8%
1940	11,573		12.5%
1950	10,759		−7.0%
1960	10,274		−4.5%
1970	9,420		−8.3%
1980	11,584		23.0%
1990	11,098		−4.2%
2000	12,806		15.4%
2010	13,435		4.9%
2020	12,800		−4.7%
2025 (est.)	12,645	▼	−1.2%
U.S. Decennial Census; 1790–1960 1900–1990; 1990–2000 2010–2020

=== 2020 census ===
As of the 2020 census, the county had a population of 12,800. The median age was 43.6 years. 22.0% of residents were under the age of 18 and 18.9% of residents were 65 years of age or older. For every 100 females there were 101.4 males, and for every 100 females age 18 and over there were 99.6 males age 18 and over.

The racial makeup of the county was 95.8% White, 0.4% Black or African American, 0.1% American Indian and Alaska Native, 0.2% Asian, <0.1% Native Hawaiian and Pacific Islander, 0.1% from some other race, and 3.4% from two or more races. Hispanic or Latino residents of any race comprised 0.7% of the population.

5.7% of residents lived in urban areas, while 94.3% lived in rural areas.

There were 5,170 households in the county, of which 28.8% had children under the age of 18 living in them. Of all households, 47.0% were married-couple households, 20.3% were households with a male householder and no spouse or partner present, and 24.5% were households with a female householder and no spouse or partner present. About 27.9% of all households were made up of individuals and 12.2% had someone living alone who was 65 years of age or older.

There were 5,923 housing units, of which 12.7% were vacant. Among occupied housing units, 75.8% were owner-occupied and 24.2% were renter-occupied. The homeowner vacancy rate was 1.5% and the rental vacancy rate was 5.5%.

=== Racial and ethnic composition ===
Vinton County, Ohio – Racial and ethnic composition Note: the US Census treats Hispanic/Latino as an ethnic category. This table excludes Latinos from the racial categories and assigns them to a separate category. Hispanics/Latinos may be of any race.
Race / ethnicity (NH = Non-Hispanic)	Pop 1980	Pop 1990	Pop 2000	Pop 2010	Pop 2020	% 1980	% 1990	% 2000	% 2010	% 2020
White alone (NH)	11,498	11,042	12,518	13,103	12,213	99.26%	99.50%	97.75%	97.53%	95.41%
Black or African American alone (NH)	9	4	45	37	43	0.08%	0.04%	0.35%	0.28%	0.34%
Native American or Alaska Native alone (NH)	7	16	56	46	19	0.06%	0.14%	0.44%	0.34%	0.15%
Asian alone (NH)	5	3	11	23	22	0.04%	0.03%	0.09%	0.17%	0.17%
Native Hawaiian or Pacific Islander alone (NH)	x	x	0	1	0	x	x	0.00%	0.01%	0.00%
Other race alone (NH)	4	0	0	4	14	0.03%	0.00%	0.00%	0.03%	0.11%
Mixed race or Multiracial (NH)	x	x	116	150	405	x	x	0.91%	1.12%	3.16%
Hispanic or Latino (any race)	61	33	60	71	84	0.53%	0.30%	0.47%	0.53%	0.66%
Total	11,584	11,098	12,806	13,435	12,800	100.00%	100.00%	100.00%	100.00%	100.00%

=== 2010 census ===
As of the 2010 United States census, there were 13,435 people, 5,260 households, and 3,640 families residing in the county. The population density was 32.6 inhabitants per square mile (12.6/km^{2}). There were 6,291 housing units at an average density of 15.3 units per square mile (5.9 units/km^{2}). The racial makeup of the county was 97.9% white, 0.4% American Indian, 0.3% black or African American, 0.2% Asian, 0.1% from other races, and 1.1% from two or more races. Those of Hispanic or Latino origin made up 0.5% of the population. In terms of ancestry, 17.0% were German, 16.2% were American, 14.2% were Irish, and 7.5% were English.

Of the 5,260 households, 32.9% had children under the age of 18 living with them, 51.0% were married couples living together, 12.1% had a female householder with no husband present, 30.8% were non-families, and 26.1% of all households were made up of individuals. The average household size was 2.54 and the average family size was 3.03. The median age was 39.6 years.

The median income for a household in the county was $34,242 and the median income for a family was $37,409. Males had a median income of $36,598 versus $28,226 for females. The per capita income for the county was $16,736. About 17.3% of families and 19.5% of the population were below the poverty line, including 25.8% of those under age 18 and 13.3% of those age 65 or over.

=== 2000 census ===
As of the census of 2000, there were 12,806 people, 4,892 households, and 3,551 families residing in the county. The population density was 31 people per square mile (12 people/km^{2}). There were 5,653 housing units at an average density of 14 units per square mile (5.4/km^{2}). The racial makeup of the county was 98.08% White, 0.35% Black or African American, 0.45% Native American, 0.09% Asian, 0.08% from other races, and 0.95% from two or more races. 0.47% of the population were Hispanic or Latino of any race.

There were 4,892 households, out of which 34.00% had children under the age of 18 living with them, 57.20% were married couples living together, 10.20% had a female householder with no husband present, and 27.40% were non-families. 23.60% of all households were made up of individuals, and 9.40% had someone living alone who was 65 years of age or older. The average household size was 2.59 and the average family size was 3.04.

In the county, the population was spread out, with 26.90% under the age of 18, 8.80% from 18 to 24, 29.00% from 25 to 44, 23.10% from 45 to 64, and 12.10% who were 65 years of age or older. The median age was 36 years. For every 100 females there were 99.10 males. For every 100 females age 18 and over, there were 95.50 males.

The median income for a household in the county was $29,465, and the median income for a family was $34,371. Males had a median income of $30,936 versus $21,257 for females. The per capita income for the county was $13,731. About 15.10% of families and 20.00% of the population were below the poverty line, including 27.60% of those under age 18 and 13.50% of those age 65 or over.

== Politics ==
Vinton County is typically a Republican county in presidential elections, having picked the GOP candidate in 12 of the last 16 elections.

United States presidential election results for Vinton County, Ohio
Year	Republican		Democratic		Third party(ies)	
Year	No.	%	No.	%	No.	%
1856	932	43.21%	1,174	54.43%	51	2.36%
1860	1,246	49.39%	1,231	48.79%	46	1.82%
1864	1,212	47.42%	1,344	52.58%	0	0.00%
1868	1,499	49.10%	1,554	50.90%	0	0.00%
1872	1,314	49.31%	1,340	50.28%	11	0.41%
1876	1,533	45.58%	1,817	54.03%	13	0.39%
1880	1,700	45.98%	1,992	53.88%	5	0.14%
1884	1,725	47.94%	1,852	51.47%	21	0.58%
1888	1,832	48.93%	1,865	49.81%	47	1.26%
1892	1,710	48.18%	1,743	49.11%	96	2.70%
1896	2,035	52.43%	1,821	46.92%	25	0.64%
1900	2,141	56.06%	1,648	43.15%	30	0.79%
1904	1,994	59.68%	1,286	38.49%	61	1.83%
1908	1,916	55.10%	1,496	43.03%	65	1.87%
1912	952	31.87%	1,228	41.11%	807	27.02%
1916	1,420	48.75%	1,433	49.19%	60	2.06%
1920	2,559	54.06%	2,124	44.87%	51	1.08%
1924	2,244	51.87%	1,838	42.49%	244	5.64%
1928	2,810	63.75%	1,559	35.37%	39	0.88%
1932	2,715	50.10%	2,655	48.99%	49	0.90%
1936	3,056	51.16%	2,902	48.58%	16	0.27%
1940	3,190	57.03%	2,404	42.97%	0	0.00%
1944	2,719	59.82%	1,826	40.18%	0	0.00%
1948	2,323	53.34%	2,016	46.29%	16	0.37%
1952	2,903	58.86%	2,029	41.14%	0	0.00%
1956	2,998	61.01%	1,916	38.99%	0	0.00%
1960	3,043	59.97%	2,031	40.03%	0	0.00%
1964	1,919	42.30%	2,618	57.70%	0	0.00%
1968	2,219	52.31%	1,608	37.91%	415	9.78%
1972	2,725	62.85%	1,537	35.45%	74	1.71%
1976	2,148	44.33%	2,629	54.25%	69	1.42%
1980	2,484	49.05%	2,381	47.02%	199	3.93%
1984	3,041	59.80%	1,990	39.13%	54	1.06%
1988	2,652	52.19%	2,385	46.94%	44	0.87%
1992	1,975	36.83%	2,308	43.04%	1,080	20.14%
1996	1,673	34.77%	2,350	48.85%	788	16.38%
2000	2,720	54.99%	2,037	41.18%	189	3.82%
2004	3,249	54.81%	2,651	44.72%	28	0.47%
2008	3,021	53.51%	2,463	43.62%	162	2.87%
2012	2,856	52.02%	2,436	44.37%	198	3.61%
2016	3,883	70.09%	1,351	24.39%	306	5.52%
2020	4,632	76.71%	1,331	22.04%	75	1.24%
2024	4,531	78.58%	1,169	20.27%	66	1.14%

== Government and infrastructure ==
Vinton County has a three-member Board of County Commissioners that administers and oversees the various county departments, similar to all but two of the 88 Ohio counties. The elected commissioners serve four-year terms. The elected commissioners are Tim Eberts, Mark Fout, and William Wellman.

=== Emergency services ===
The following emergency services, with their locations, serve the county:

- Ohio State Highway Patrol
- Vinton County Sheriff's Department
  - 31835 OH-93, McArthur
- McArthur Police Department
  - 124 West Main Street, McArthur
- Vinton County Emergency Medical Services
  - 31931 State Route 93, McArthur
- Vinton County Emergency Management Agency
  - 31835 OH-93, McArthur
- MedFlight 3
  - 110 West Second Street, Wellston
- LifeAir
  - 1843 River Road, Chillicothe
- McArthur Fire Department
  - 303 West High Street, McArthur
- Hamden Fire Department
  - 100 Wilkesville Street, Hamden
- Wilkesville Fire Department
  - 161 Main Street, Wilkesville
- Zaleski Fire Department
  - State Route 278, Zaleski
- Harrison Township Fire Department
  - 51560 Old Route 50, Londonderry

=== Post Offices ===
There are post offices in the following Vinton County communities:

- Hamden
- McArthur
- New Plymouth
- Ray
- Wilkesville
- Zaleski
- Wellston
- Jackson

=== Utilities ===
The following utilities serve Vinton County:

==== Phone, Internet and cable ====
- Horizon Telephone
- Ohio Hills
- Frognet
- Verizon
- First Communications
- Time Warner Cable
- Frontier

==== Gas and electricity ====
- Columbia Gas of Ohio
- South Central Power Company
- American Electric Power
- Buckeye Rural Electric Co-Op

==== Water and garbage disposal ====
- Ross County Water Company
- Jackson County Water Company
- Leax Water Company
- McArthur Water Department
- Rumpke
- Waste Management

== Education ==
The entire county is served by the Vinton County Local School District which operates the following schools:

- West Elementary
  - 57750 US Highway 50, Allensville, Ohio 45651
- South Elementary
  - 38234 State Route 93, Hamden, Ohio 45634
- Central Elementary
  - 507 Jefferson Avenue, McArthur, Ohio 45651
- Vinton County Middle School
  - 63780 Locker Plant Road, McArthur, Ohio 45651
- Vinton County High School
  - 63910 US Highway 50, McArthur, Ohio 45651

== Media ==
Vinton County is served by one local newspaper outlet, The Courier, a print newspaper and website. It is also served by a local communications group, Total Media, based in Jackson, which provides a second newspaper for the area, The Telegram, as well as numerous radio stations, and a local internet talk show, called Main Street TV.

== Transportation ==
=== Airports ===
Vinton County has one public airport, the Vinton County Airport (K22I/22I). The runway is a 3725' x 75' asphalt, east–west (09/27) runway with a single intersecting taxiway. Navigation and radio equipment includes a two-light PAPI for runway 27, Pilot Controlled Lighting and UNICOM.

The airport is leased to the Vinton County Pilots & Booster Association by the county, who raise funds to maintain and update the airport. As of 2015, the boosters are raising funds to finance a 2000-foot runway extension and resurfacing project. The airport is equipped to provide basic service to piston-engined general aviation aircraft. Flight instruction services are also available.

=== Highways ===
- U.S. Route 50
- State Route 32
- State Route 56
- State Route 93
- State Route 124
- State Route 160
- State Route 278
- State Route 324
- State Route 327
- State Route 328
- State Route 356
- State Route 671
- State Route 677
- State Route 683
- State Route 689

== Tourism ==
=== Covered bridges ===
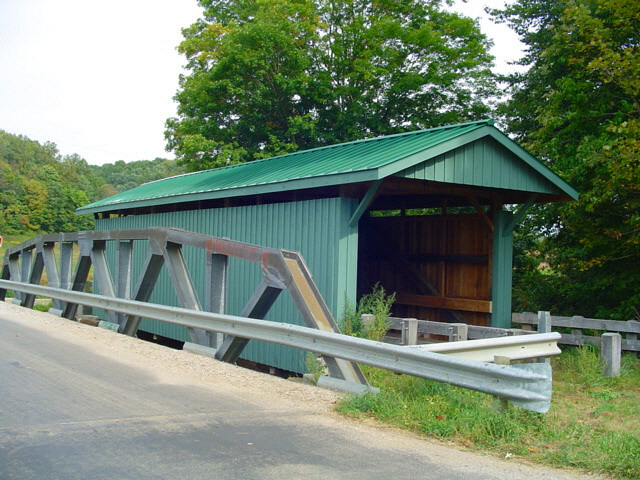
Mt. Olive Covered Bridge

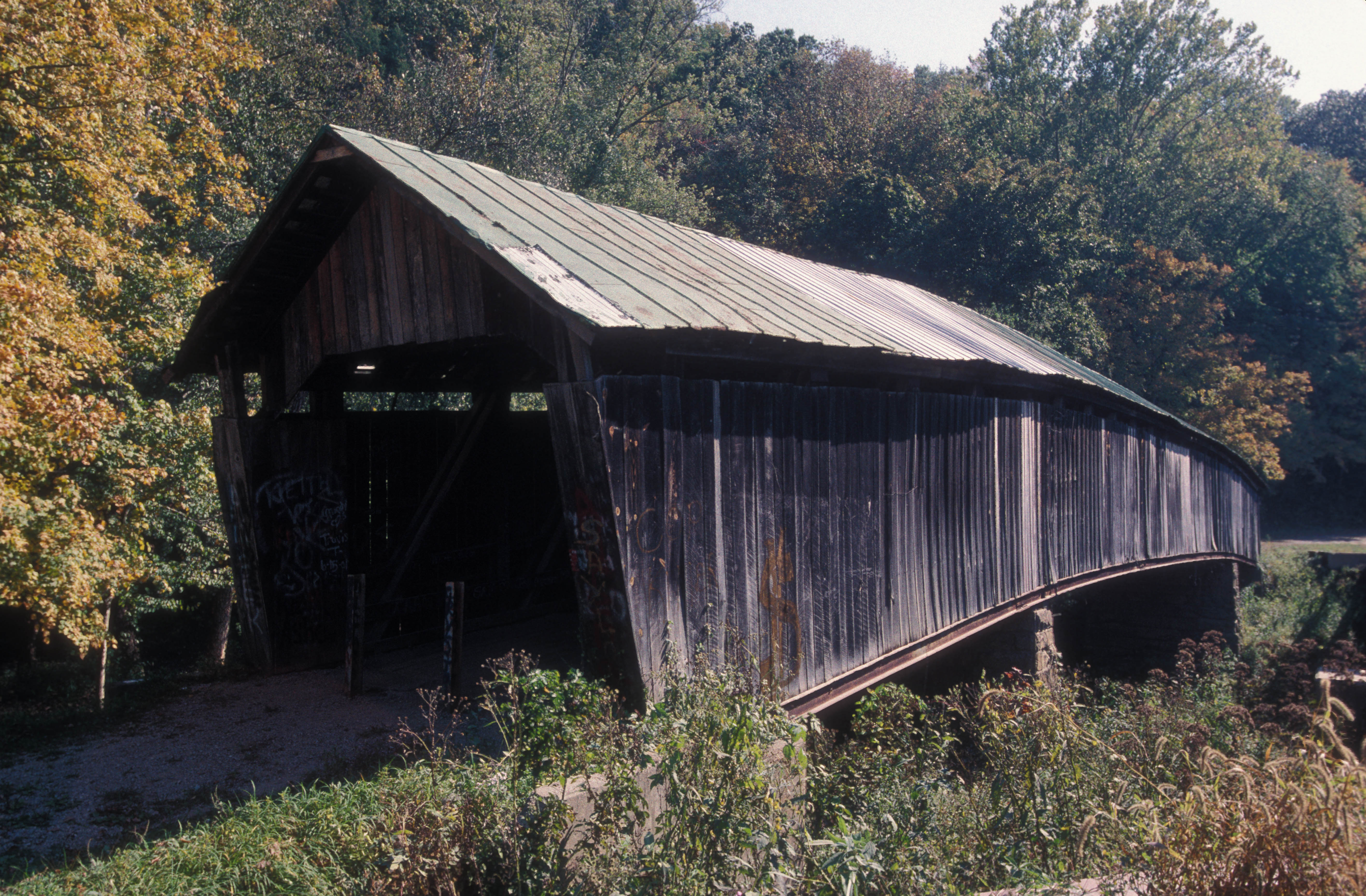
Ponn Covered Bridge prior to arson

There are four covered bridges located around Vinton County. The most famous bridge was the Ponn Bridge, also known as the Humpback Bridge due to its shape. It was built in 1874 and was the longest one in the county. This bridge was burned down in June 2013 by arsonists. In 1875, the Mt. Olive Bridge was built by a Civil War veteran named George Washington Pilcher. This bridge is open to foot traffic and goes over the Middle Fork Salt Creek. The Bay Bridge is located on the Vinton County Fairgrounds. It was moved to the fairgrounds from Bay Road in 1967 during the construction of Lake Rupert and is still open to pedestrians. The Cox Bridge was built in 1884. The bridge is open to foot traffic and has a picnic area near it. The Arbaugh Bridge was built in 1871, making it the oldest covered bridge in the county. This bridge is the only one in the county open to vehicles thanks to a grant that allowed for renovations.

=== State Parks and Recreation Areas ===
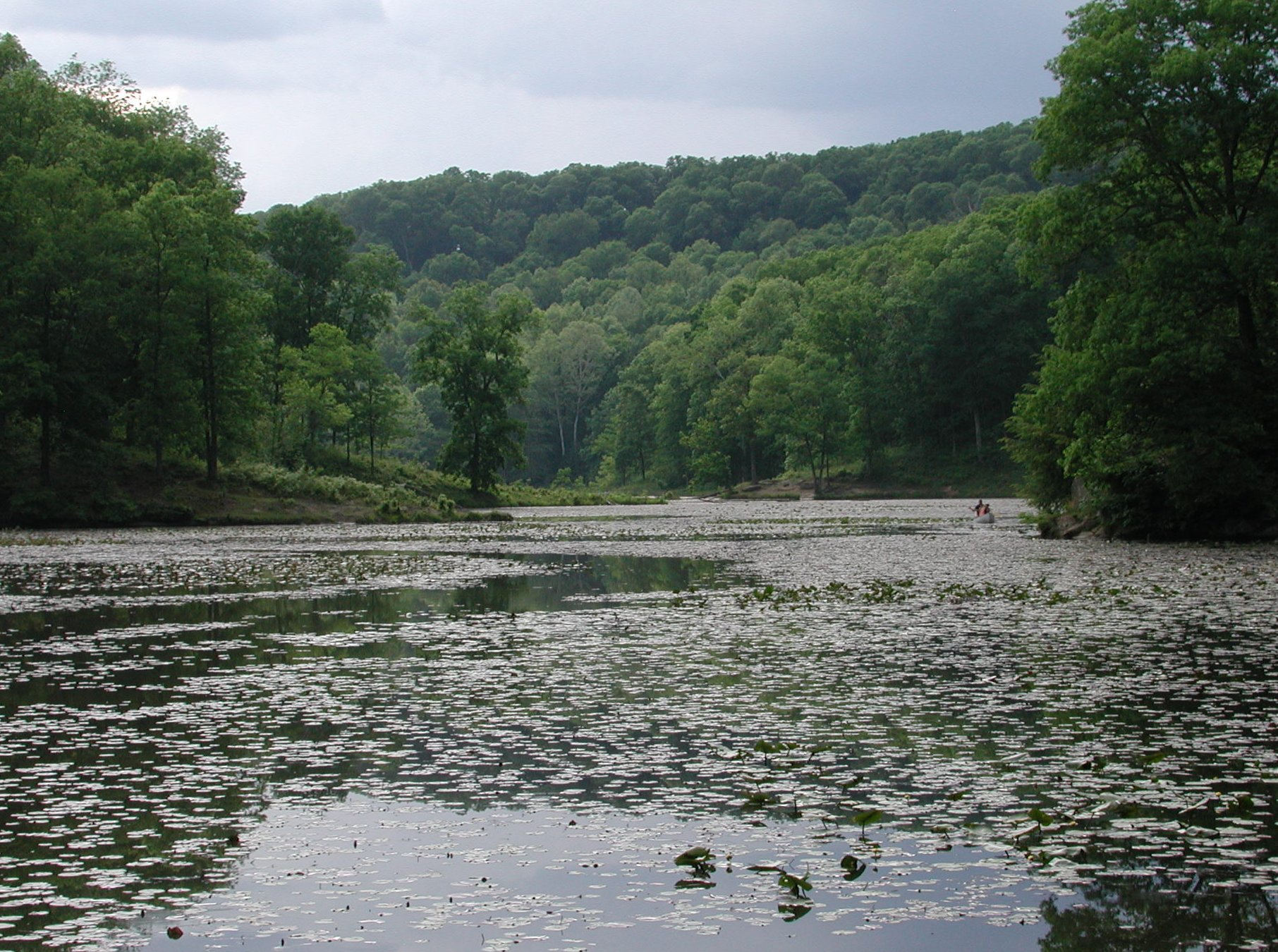
Lake Hope State Park

There are eight recreation areas in Vinton County. The state parks consist of Lake Alma State Park located in Wellston, Ohio and Lake Hope State Park located in McArthur, Ohio. There are also four state forests consisting of Richland Furnace State Forest, Tar Hollow State Forest, Vinton Furnace State Forest, and Zaleski State Forest. Along with these, there is the Wayne National Forest, which covers many other counties in Ohio besides Vinton County, Raccoon Ecological Management Area located on State Route 160, and the Wellston Wildlife Area and Lake Rupert located on State Route 683. There are also many more public areas within a short distance of Vinton County. Vinton county is more than 70 percent wooded.

=== Hocking Hills Region ===
The Hocking Hills Region is located north of Vinton County. Due to the Hocking Hills’ mainstream popularity, visitors often choose to book lodging in Vinton County to avoid the crowds.

=== Lake Hope Bike Trails ===
Lake Hope State Park is located in Vinton and Athens Counties. There are five loop trails in the park ranging from 4.5 miles to 16 miles. The Hope Furnace Trail loop is the shortest of the trails at 4.5 miles. The Sidewinder Loop is 5.5 miles, the Copperhead Loop is 10 miles, and the New Big Loop is 15 miles. The longest of the trails in the Old Big Loop at 16 miles.

=== Zaleski Backpack Trails ===
There are two trails in Zaleski State Forest, a trail of 23.5 miles and a day trail of 10 miles.

=== Moonville Rail-Trail ===
Moonville Rail-Trail is a 16-mile rail trail that follows an abandoned B&O railroad line from Mineral to Zaleski. It gets its name from the ghost town of Moonville and passes through a brick railroad tunnel at Moonville and a wooden railroad tunnel at King’s Hollow. The trail cuts through Zaleski State Forest and goes through many woodlands and wetlands. The Moonville Rail Trail Association, a local nonprofit organization established in April 2001, is currently working to make the trail more accessible by replacing bridges that were removed when the railroad was abandoned in the 1980s. The association meets at 6:30 p.m. every third Tuesday of the month at Hope Schoolhouse on Wheelabout Road.

=== Quilt barns ===
Throughout Vinton County, 27 quilt barns are scattered by the roadways. They are located on Vinton County's Quilt Trail.

- Liberty Star Basket
- Basket Weave
- A Pig's Tail
- Christmas Star
- Country Farm
- On Wings of Eagles
- Corn and Beans
- Turkey Tracks
- Maple Leaf
- Mountains
- Ohio Star
- The Fan
- Follow the Drinking Gourd
- Summer Winds
- There's No Place Like Home
- Pine Tree
- Mosaic
- Autumn Sojourn
- Whirlygig
- Airplane
- Cross and Crowns
- Schoolhouse
- Farm Friendliness
- Anvil
- Shortcut to School
- Horse Squares
- V-Block

=== Events ===
==== Wild Turkey Festival ====
The Wild Turkey Festival is a music festival held in McArthur, Ohio, on the first weekend of May, beginning on the Thursday evening and concluding on the Sunday afternoon. A parade runs through the town on the Saturday night.

==== Ridgetop Music Festival ====
Every August, the Ridgetop Music Festival is held at the Vinton County Airport which offers music and airplane rides throughout the festival.

==== Vinton County Air Show ====
The air show is held on the third Sunday in September. The show is the biggest free air show in Ohio and includes food and aerial acts.

==== Midnight At Moonville ====
Midnight at Moonville is one-day Halloween-themed festival featuring dramatic storytelling, wagon rides, regional craft vendors, souvenirs, historical presentations, and music performances located at the Moonville Tunnel. The 2020 edition of Midnight at Moonville was cancelled due to COVID-19.

== Communities ==
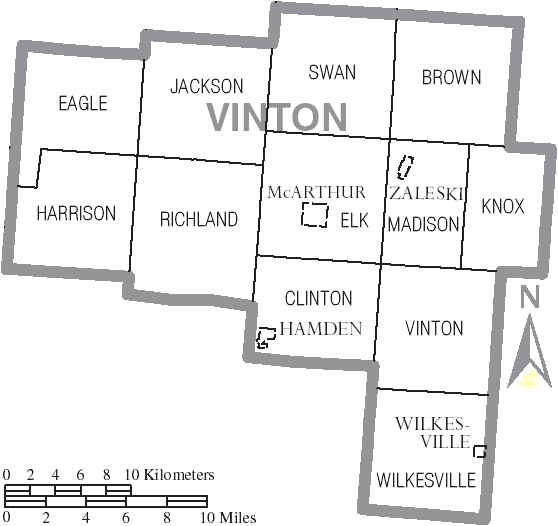
Map of Vinton County, Ohio with municipal and township labels

=== Villages ===
- Hamden
- McArthur (county seat)
- Wilkesville
- Zaleski

=== Townships ===
- Brown
- Clinton
- Eagle
- Elk
- Harrison
- Jackson
- Knox
- Madison
- Richland
- Swan
- Vinton
- Wilkesville

=== Unincorporated communities ===
- Allensville
- Creola
- Dundas
- Eagle Mills
- Hawks
- Hope
- Hue
- Jimtown
- Knox
- New Plymouth
- Orland
- Prattsville
- Puritan
- Radcliff
- Ratcliffburg
- Ray
- Siverly
- Stella
- Vales Mills

=== Ghost towns ===
- Ingham
- Moonville
- Oreton
- Richland
- Vinton Furnace
- Minerton

== See also ==
- Covered bridges of southeast Ohio
- National Register of Historic Places listings in Vinton County, Ohio
