= Vinton Furnace, Ohio =

- Ghost town
- Interactive map of Vinton Furnace, Ohio
- Coordinates: 39.218°N 82.407°W
- Country: United States
- State: Ohio

Vinton Furnace, also known as Vinton Station, is a ghost town located in Elk Township and Madison Township, Vinton County, Ohio, in the United States.

== Location ==
Vinton Furnace is located east of McArthur off of Stone Quarry Road. It is located in Vinton Furnace State Forest, which gets its name from the town and furnace. The area is open to visitors between 6am and 11pm daily.

== History ==
Vinton Furnace started around 1854, employing around 100 men. It had a post office that ran from 1854 to 1901. From 1854 to 1857, the post office was known as Vinton Furnace. From 1857 to 1901 the name of the post office was changed to Vinton Station. The remains of the Belgium Coke Ovens, thought to be the only left remaining in the world, are located at Vinton Furnace. They were a failure at the Vinton Furnace site, as the coal available was too high in sulfur. There was also a railroad spur that led to Vinton Furnace from the B&O Mainline to ship and receive goods.
