= Hope, Ohio =

Unincorporated community in Ohio, U.S.

Coordinates: 39°19′06″N 82°20′14″W

Hope is an unincorporated community in Brown Township, Vinton County, Ohio, USA.

== History ==
Hope once contained an iron blast furnace. A post office called Hope Furnace was established in 1865, and remained in operation until 1890. Lake Hope State Park, which gets its name from the town, is located nearby and covers part of the town. There are two buildings remaining from the town of Hope, one is the one-room Hope Schoolhouse, which has been renovated and is used for meetings, as a visitors center, and provides exhibits and educational programs on the area's history and culture. The other is an old abandoned Church located on Wheelabout Road south of the schoolhouse, but is in very poor condition. The Moonville Rail-Trail also passes through Hope, and a trailhead for the Zaleski State Forest backpacking trails is located at the Hope Schoolhouse.
