= Ohio State Route 327 =

State highway in Ohio, US

State Route 327

Route information
- Maintained by ODOT
- Length: 47.35 mi (76.20 km)
- Existed: 1933–present

Major junctions
- South end: US 35 near Jackson
- SR 32 / SR 124 near Wellston; US 50 in Londonderry
- North end: SR 180 in Adelphi

Location
- Country: United States
- State: Ohio
- Counties: Jackson, Vinton, Ross, Hocking

Highway system
- Ohio State Highway System; Interstate; US; State; Scenic
← SR 326	→ SR 328

State Route 327 (SR 327) is a north–south state highway in the south central portion of the U.S. state of Ohio. Its southern terminus is at U.S. Route 35 (US 35) about seven miles (11 km) southeast of Jackson, at a one-quadrant interchange. It ends at its northern terminus at SR 180 in Adelphi.

== History ==
SR 327 was commissioned in 1932, routed between Roads and Wellston. In 1935 the highway was extended north to Adelphi. The highway was extended south to US 35 in 1937. In 2002, work began on replacing an at-grade intersection at SR 32 into an interchange south of Wellston. The $9 million project was funded jointly by the Federal Highway Safety Infrastructure program and ODOT's Highway Safety Program (HSP). The project was completed in July 2004 at a cost of $12.5 million, an increase of $3.5 than originally estimated. It also rerouted SR 124 in a brief concurrency.

== Major intersections ==
County	Location	mi	km	Destinations	Notes
Jackson	Bloomfield Township	0.00	0.00	US 35 – Jackson, Rio Grande	
Jackson	Milton Township	6.76	10.88	SR 124 east / CR 78 (Fairgreens Road) – Buckeye Furnace State Memorial	Southern end of SR 124 concurrency
Jackson	Milton Township	7.22– 7.33	11.62– 11.80	SR 32 / SR 124 east – Athens, Jackson	Interchange, exit 17 (SR 32), northern end of SR 124 concurrency
Jackson	Wellston	8.93	14.37	SR 93 south (East 13th Street)	Southern end of SR 93 concurrency
Jackson	Wellston	9.79	15.76	SR 93 north (Pennsylvania Avenue) / East Broadway Street	Northern end of SR 93 concurrency
Vinton	Harrison Township	26.18	42.13	US 50 east – McArthur	Eastern end of US 50 concurrency
Ross	Liberty Township	30.21	48.62	US 50 west – Chillicothe	Western end of US 50 concurrency
Vinton	Eagle Township	33.29	53.58	SR 671 east – Ratcliffburg	Western terminus of SR 671
Hocking	No major junctions				
Ross	Adelphi	47.35	76.20	SR 180 / Main Street	
1.000 mi = 1.609 km; 1.000 km = 0.621 mi: Concurrency terminus
