= Ray, Ohio =

Unincorporated community in Ohio, U.S.

Coordinates: 39°12′13″N 82°41′01″W

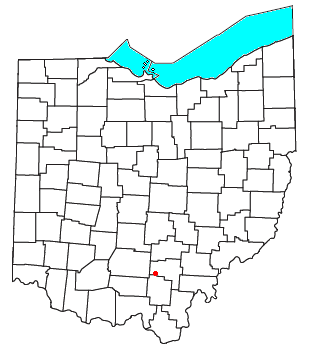
Location of Ray, Ohio

Ray is an unincorporated community in southeastern Harrison Township, Vinton County, Ohio, United States. It has a post office with the ZIP code 45672. It is located along State Route 327 in western Vinton County.

== History ==
Ray was originally called Raysville, and under the latter name was platted in 1853 by Moses Ray, and named for his family. Another former variant name was Rays. A post office was established under the name Rays in 1856, and the name was changed to Ray in 1893.
