= Mt. Olive Road Covered Bridge =

- U.S. National Register of Historic Places
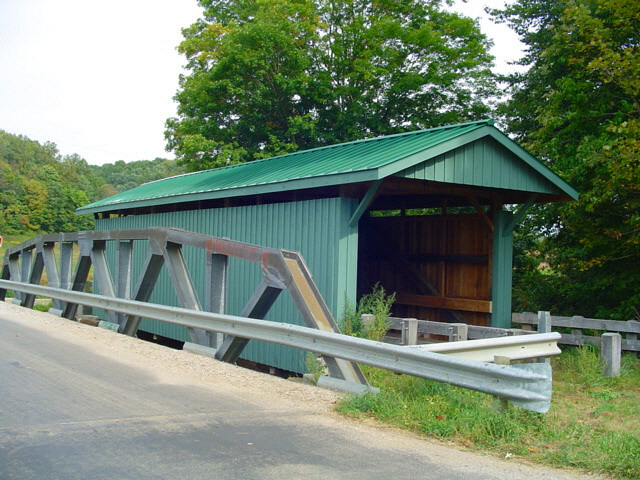
- Southern side of the bridge, located adjacent to its replacement

- Location within Ohio Location within the United States
- Location: 1 mile northeast of Allensville on Mt. Olive Road, Jackson Township
- Nearest city: Allensville, Ohio
- Coordinates: 39°17′10″N 82°35′21″W
- Area: less than one acre
- Built: 1875
- Architect: George W. Pilcher
- Architectural style: Queen post truss
- NRHP reference No.: 76001538
- Added to NRHP: October 8, 1976

The Mt. Olive Road Covered Bridge is a historic covered bridge in Vinton County, Ohio, United States. Located northeast of Allensville, the bridge carries Mt. Olive Road through a valley in northwestern Vinton County. In the earliest days of white settlement of southern Ohio, the Mt. Olive Road was a major transportation artery; until about 1825, it was heavily used by travellers between Marietta and Chillicothe.

Built on stone piers and covered with a metal roof, the Mt. Olive Road Bridge is supported by a simple queen post truss design. Its builder was local engineer George Washington Pilcher; a leading engineer in southeastern Ohio, Pilcher helped to build many other Vinton County covered bridges and contributed toward the construction of Manasseh Cutler Hall on the campus of Ohio University.

When the bridge was built, it lay amid land owned by a family named "Grandstaff"; because this family owned wide lands surrounding the bridge, it has also frequently been known as the "Grandstaff Bridge." Nevertheless, the name "Mt. Olive Road Bridge" persists; when it was named a historic site in 1973, the designation was made under that name. This designation was that of placement on the National Register of Historic Places, an honor shared by two other Vinton County covered bridges. It qualified for this distinction both because of its well-preserved historic engineering and because of its contribution to statewide history.
