= King's Station, Ohio =

American ghost town

Coordinates: 39.3199°N 82.2844°W

King's Station, also known as King's Switch or King Hollow, is a Ghost town in Waterloo Township, Athens County, Ohio, in the United States.

== History ==
King’s Station was a coal mining town that began in the late 1850s when the railroad came through the area. It was located East of Moonville and Ingham and west of Mineral. The town was abandoned in the early 1900s when the area mines shut down, but there are some newer houses scattered around the area. The railroad through the town remained active until the mid to late 1980s, when it was abandoned. Although not as popular as the nearby Moonville Tunnel, the King’s Hollow Tunnel just east of the townsite is a popular spot along the Moonville Rail-Trail.
