= Vinton County Airport =

Public use airport in McArthur, Vinton Airport, Ohio

- IATA: none; ICAO: none; FAA LID: 22I

Summary
- Owner/Operator: Vinton County
- Time zone: UTC−05:00 (-5)
  - Summer (DST): UTC−04:00 (-4)
- Elevation AMSL: 958 ft (292 m)
- Coordinates: 39°19′41″N 082°26′27″W

Map
- Location of airport in Ohio 22I (the United States)

Runways
Direction	Length		Surface
Direction	ft	m	Surface
9/27	3,725	1,135	Asphalt

Statistics (2021)
- Aircraft movements: 5,200
- Source: Federal Aviation Administration

The Vinton County Airport (FAA LID: 22I) is a publicly owned, public use airport located 5 miles northeast of McArthur, Ohio, United States, in Vinton County.

== History ==
Planning for an airport in Vinton County began as early as February 1966. The land to build it was donated by W.E. Engle, the president of the Benedict Coal Company. The airport and its 3,850 ft (1,170 m) runway were dedicated on 10 October 1971.

== Events ==
=== Vinton County Airshow ===
The Vinton County Airport is home to the Vinton County Air Show, which is the largest free air show in the state of Ohio. The show features aerial acts, food, a candy drop, a skydiving team, and free airplane rides.

Displays feature aircraft like the Super Decathlon and Taylorcraft-built aircraft. There are also displays of remote-controlled aircraft.

The airshow takes place on the third Sunday in September. It serves as a major fundraiser for the airport.

=== Music festival ===
The airport has historically hosted music festivals and car shows, which often include free airplane rides for attendees.

== Facilities and aircraft ==
The airport has one runway. Designated as runway 9/27, it measures 3725 x 75 ft (1135 x 23 m) and is paved with asphalt.

The airport has a fixed-base operator that sells fuel.

For the 12-month period ending October 5, 2021, the airport had 5,200 aircraft operations, an average of 100 per week. It included 95% general aviation and 5% military. For the same time period, 11 aircraft were based at the airport, all airplanes: 11 single-engine and 1 multi-engine.

== Accidents and incidents ==
- On December 23, 2011, a single-engine Beechcraft 19A Musketeer airplane crashed near the Vinton County Airport. The aircraft was reportedly on approach to the airport but crashed on a road parallel to the airport. The probable cause of the accident was found to be the pilot's failure to maintain airplane control during an attempted go-around.
- On May 17, 2017, a single-engine airplane crashed while trying to land at the Vinton County Airport. The plane went off the right side of the runway and hit some trees.
