= Ingham, Ohio =

Ghost town in Ohio, United States

- Location within the state of Ohio Ingham (the United States)
- Coordinates: 39°18′50″N 82°17′48″W
- Country: United States
- State: Ohio
- County: Athens
- Elevation: 696 ft (212 m)
- Time zone: UTC-5 (Eastern (EST))
  - Summer (DST): UTC-4 (EDT)
- GNIS feature ID: 1071117

Ingham (also known as Ingham Station or Ingham's Station) is a ghost town in southeastern Brown Township, Vinton County, Ohio, and western Waterloo Township, Athens County, Ohio, United States. The town is located east of the more well known ghost town of Moonville in Vinton County and west of Mineral and King’s Station in Athens County

Ingham had its start when the railroad was extended to the mines at that point. William N. Jaynes was postmaster from March 25, 1903, until mail was discontinued on April 30, 1904, when it was sent to the Mineral post office. The town was abandoned when the mines shut down in the early 1900s. The tracks through Ingham remained in use until the late 1980s when the route was abandoned between Red Diamond in Vinton County and Belpre in Washington County. The railroad bed through Ingham is now the Moonville Rail-Trail.
