= Ohio State Route 324 =

State highway in Vinton County, Ohio, US

State Route 324

Route information
- Maintained by ODOT
- Length: 4.44 mi (7.15 km)
- Existed: 1932–present

Major junctions
- South end: SR 160 near Hamden
- North end: SR 93 near Hamden

Location
- Country: United States
- State: Ohio
- Counties: Vinton

Highway system
- Ohio State Highway System; Interstate; US; State; Scenic
| ← SR 323 | → SR 325 |

State Route 324 (SR 324) is a north–south state highway in the southern portion of the U.S. state of Ohio. The southern terminus of SR 324 is at a T-intersection with SR 160 about 4.50 miles (7.24 km) east of Hamden. Its northern terminus is at SR 93 nearly 4 miles (6.4 km) northeast of Hamden.

== Route description ==
All of SR 324 is nestled within the confines of Clinton Township in the southeastern portion of Vinton County. It begins at a T-intersection with SR 160 approximately 4.50 miles (7.24 km) east of Hamden. For the majority of its length, SR 324 travels in a northwesterly fashion. The highway starts out traversing heavily wooded terrain, but soon transitions into a more open landscape. A few homes also appear along the way. Further along, the terrain starts to vary more, with a blend of forest and field appearing for much of the remainder of the length of SR 324. It turns north into the hamlet of Dundas, and passes a number of homes just prior to bending to the northwest, after which it crosses a set of railroad tracks and arrives at its endpoint at its junction with SR 93.

SR 324 is not a route that is included within the National Highway System.

== History ==
SR 324 was established in 1932. For the duration of its history, this state highway has maintained the same routing within the southeastern quadrant of Vinton County. The only change over the years has been that the highway originally meeting SR 324 at its northern terminus was not SR 93, but rather its predecessor, SR 75. SR 160 has always been the intersecting highway at the southern terminus of SR 324.

== Major intersections ==
The entire route is in Clinton Township, Vinton County.

| mi | km | Destinations | Notes |
|---|---|---|---|
| 0.00 | 0.00 | SR 160 – Hamden, Wilkesville | |
| 4.44 | 7.15 | SR 93 | |
1.000 mi = 1.609 km; 1.000 km = 0.621 mi
