= Ohio State Route 670 =

State Route 670

Route information
- Maintained by ODOT

Location
- Country: United States
- State: Ohio

Highway system
- Ohio State Highway System; Interstate; US; State; Scenic
← I-670	→ SR 671

In Ohio, State Route 670 may refer to:

- Interstate 670 in Ohio, the only Ohio highway numbered 670 since about 1974
- Ohio State Route 670 (1930s-1970s), now SR 761 and part of SR 313
