= Puritan, Ohio =

Unincorporated community in Ohio, U.S.

Coordinates: 39°09′31″N 82°29′21″W

Puritan is an unincorporated community in Vinton County, in the U.S. state of Ohio. It is situated to the east of Hamden, Ohio, and the west of Wilkesville, Ohio, as well as north of Wellston, Ohio.

== History ==
Puritan was originally known for its brick-making industry.
