= Vales Mills, Ohio =

Unincorporated community in Ohio, U.S.

Coordinates: 39°10′40″N 82°18′53″W

Vales Mills is an unincorporated community in Vinton County, in the U.S. state of Ohio.

== History ==
The community took its name from Vale's Mill, a sawmill and gristmill. A post office was established at Vales Mills in 1878, and remained in operation until 1938. Arthur P. Vale was the first postmaster.
