= Richland, Ohio =

Ghost town in Ohio, U.S.

Coordinates: 39°11′13″N 82°35′51″W

Richland is a ghost town in Vinton County, in the U.S. state of Ohio. The GNIS classifies it as a populated place.

== History ==
An old variant name of Richland was Richland Furnace. Richland Furnace was a blast furnace completed in 1854. A post office called Richland was established in 1872, and remained in operation until 1914.
