= Minerton, Ohio =

Unincorporated community in Ohio, U.S.

Coordinates: 39°04′00″N 82°24′14″W

Minerton is a ghost town in Vinton County, in the U.S. state of Ohio. The GNIS classifies it as a populated place.

== History ==
The first store in Minerton opened in 1880. A post office was established at Minerton in 1880, and remained in operation until 1914.
