= Jimtown, Ohio =

Unincorporated community in Ohio, U.S.

Coordinates: 39°21′12″N 82°43′20″W

Jimtown is an unincorporated community in Vinton County, in the U.S. state of Ohio.

== History ==
An early variant name of Jimtown was Pike Run. A post office called Pike Run was established in 1880, and remained in operation until 1909.
