= Eagle Mills, Ohio =

Unincorporated community in Ohio, U.S.

Coordinates: 39°19′43″N 82°41′32″W

Eagle Mills is an unincorporated community in Vinton County, in the U.S. state of Ohio.

== History ==
A post office called Eagle Mills was established in 1856, and remained in operation until 1917. The community took its name from Eagle Mills, a mill on Salt Creek. Eagle Mills contained a school until 1962.
