= Richland Township, Vinton County, Ohio =

Township in Ohio, US

- Township
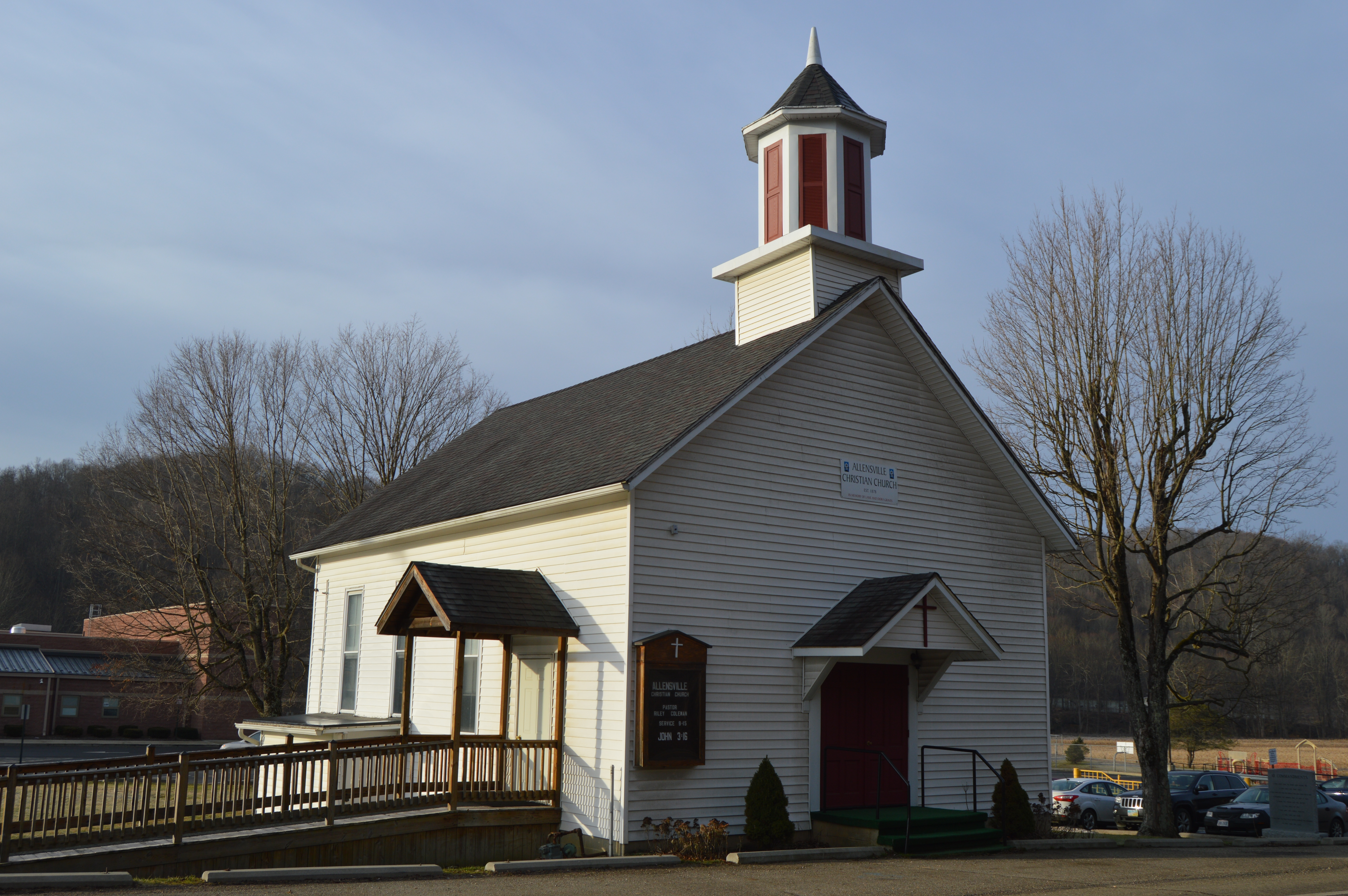
- Allensville Christian Church

- Location in Vinton County and the state of Ohio.
- Coordinates: 39°14′41″N 82°36′24″W
- Country: United States
- State: Ohio
- County: Vinton

Area
  - Total: 43.2 sq mi (112.0 km^{2})
  - Land: 43.2 sq mi (112.0 km^{2})
  - Water: 0.039 sq mi (0.1 km^{2})
- Elevation: 890 ft (270 m)

Population (2020)
  - Total: 1,620
  - Density: 37.5/sq mi (14.5/km^{2})
- Time zone: UTC-5 (Eastern (EST))
  - Summer (DST): UTC-4 (EDT)
- FIPS code: 39-66768
- GNIS feature ID: 1087107

Richland Township is one of the twelve townships of Vinton County, Ohio, United States. The 2020 census found 1,620 people in the township.

== Geography ==
Located in the western part of the county, it borders the following townships:

- Jackson Township: north
- Elk Township: east
- Clinton Township: southeast
- Washington Township, Jackson County: south
- Jackson Township, Jackson County: southwest
- Harrison Township: west
- Eagle Township: northwest corner

No municipalities are located in Richland Township.

== Name and history ==
Richland Township was organized in about 1824.

It is one of twelve Richland Townships statewide.

== Government ==
The township is governed by a three-member board of trustees, who are elected in November of odd-numbered years to a four-year term beginning on the following January 1. Two are elected in the year after the presidential election and one is elected in the year before it. There is also an elected township fiscal officer, who serves a four-year term beginning on April 1 of the year after the election, which is held in November of the year before the presidential election. Vacancies in the fiscal officership or on the board of trustees are filled by the remaining trustees.
