= Dundas, Ohio =

Unincorporated community in Ohio, U.S.

Coordinates: 39°12′13″N 82°28′49″W

Dundas is an unincorporated community in Vinton County, in the U.S. state of Ohio. It is located near the junction of State Route 324 and State Route 93.

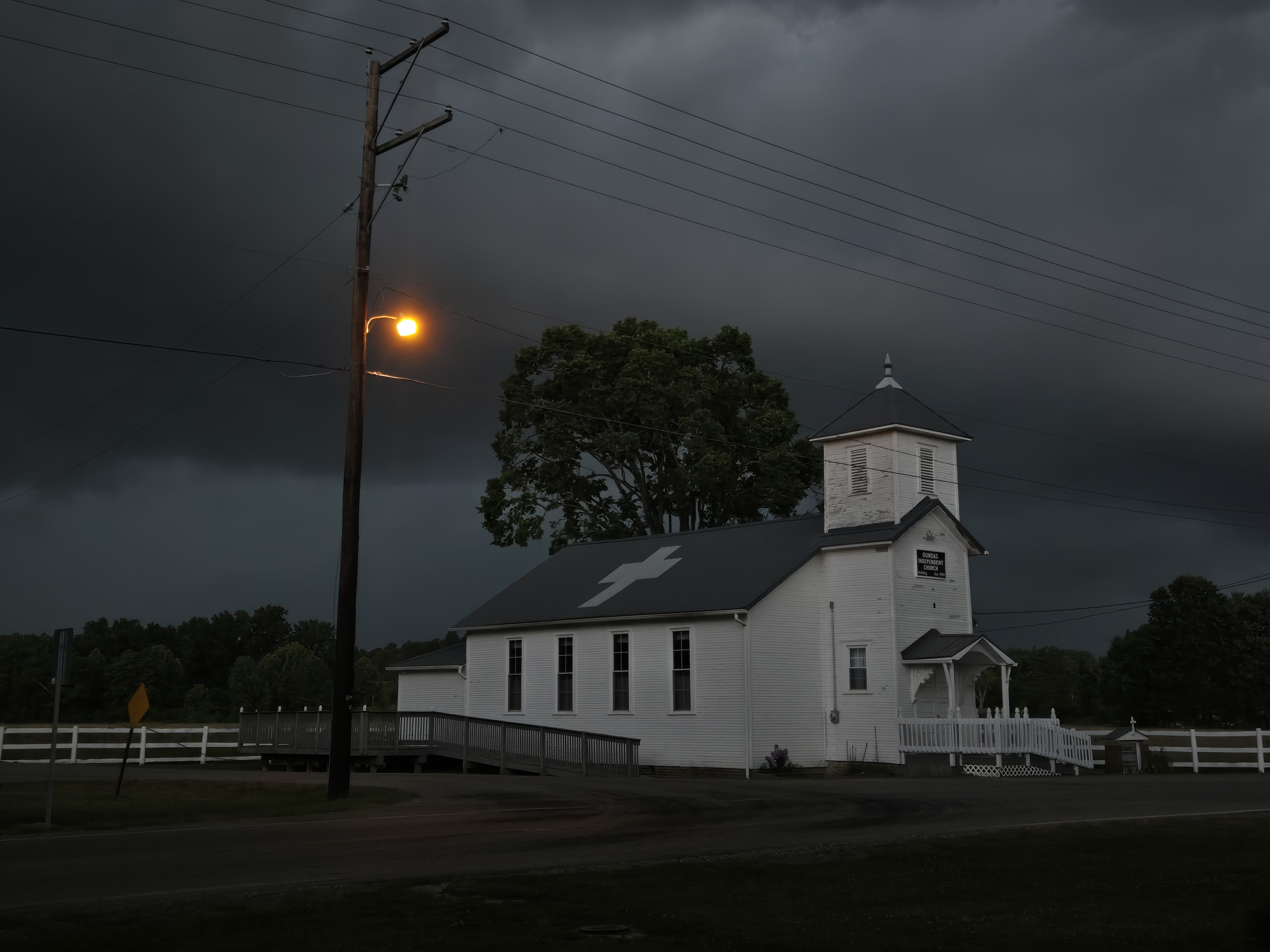
Dundas Church-Dundas, Ohio

== History ==
Dundas was established in 1857 as McArthur Junction when the B&O railroad was extended to that point. A post office called Dundas was established in 1856 and remained in operation until 1983.
