= Maude Collins =

American sheriff (1894–1972)

Maude Collins (1894–1972) was the first female to be elected sheriff in the state of Ohio. She served as sheriff of Vinton County after her husband's murder, when she was appointed to fill his post. She was then elected in 1926 to serve a second term. Collins was a direct descendant of the McCoy Clan of the Hatfield and McCoy feuding families. She was the daughter of Fanny McCoy Charles and Roland T. Charles.

Collins received national recognition for solving the murders of Sarah and William Stout, a couple living near McArthur, Ohio, in 1927. She determined that the killer, Inez Palmer, had worn larger shoes in order to mislead the detectives; however, Collins deduced that someone large enough to wear the shoes would have left deeper footprints. Her story was subsequently published in the Master Detective magazine. She was also the first woman to "deliver prisoners to the state penitentiary, a task she fulfilled fully armed in 1929".

Her work included investigations into other murder cases.

Collins died in 1972 and is buried in Hamden Cemetery. She was 78.

== See also ==
- List of first female sheriffs in the United States
