= New Plymouth, Ohio =

Unincorporated community in Ohio, U.S.

Coordinates: 39°23′05″N 82°23′47″W

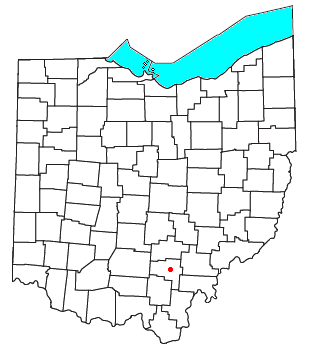
Location of New Plymouth, Ohio

New Plymouth is an unincorporated community in northwestern Brown Township, Vinton County, Ohio, United States. It has a post office with the ZIP code 45654. It is located at the intersection of State Routes 56 and 328.

== History ==
A post office has been in operation at New Plymouth since 1850. New Plymouth was named after Plymouth, Massachusetts, the native home of a large share of the early settlers.

== Tourism ==
Ravenwood Castle is a unique country inn located on Bethel Road in New Plymouth, Ohio.
