= Knox, Vinton County, Ohio =

Former town in Ohio, U.S.

Coordinates: 39°15′58″N 82°17′09″W

Knox is a former town in Vinton County, in the U.S. State of Ohio. The GNIS classifies it as a populated place.

== History ==
A post office called Knox was established in 1899, and remained in operation until 1904. The community derived its name from Henry Knox, first U.S. Secretary of War.
