= Hawks, Ohio =

Unincorporated community in Ohio, U.S.

Coordinates: 39°06′41″N 82°23′14″W

Hawks is an unincorporated community in Vinton County, in the U.S. state of Ohio.

== History ==
A variant name was Hawk. A post office called Hawks was established in 1880, the name was changed to Hawk in 1895, and the post office closed in 1937. The community has the name of Wes Hawk, a pioneer settler.
