= Dick Bates =

American baseball player (born 1945)

- Pitcher
- Born: October 7, 1945 (age 80); McArthur, Ohio, U.S.
- Batted: Left Threw: Right

MLB debut
- April 27, 1969, for the Seattle Pilots

Last MLB appearance
- April 27, 1969, for the Seattle Pilots

MLB statistics
- Win–loss record: 0-0
- Earned run average: 27.00
- Strikeouts: 3
- Stats at Baseball Reference

Teams
- Seattle Pilots (1969)

Charles Richard Bates (born October 7, 1945) is an American former Major League Baseball right-handed pitcher. He graduated from McArthur (OH) High School now Vinton County High School and was signed by the Kansas City Athletics as an undrafted free agent before the 1964 season. After that, Bates also spent time in the Washington Senators organization, and was later drafted by the Seattle Pilots as the 30th pick in the 1968 expansion draft.

Bates's major league tenure consisted of one relief appearance for the expansion Pilots, against the Oakland Athletics (April 27, 1969 at Sick's Stadium). Bates allowed six baserunners (three hits, three walks) and five earned runs along with three strikeouts in 1 2/3 innings, and ended up with a 27.00 ERA.

As of 2006, Bates was living in Glendale, Arizona, and working as the general manager of the Arizona Biltmore Golf & Country Club in nearby Phoenix.
