= Radcliff, Ohio =

Unincorporated community in Ohio, U.S.

Coordinates: 39°08′27″N 82°22′37″W

Radcliff is an unincorporated community in Vinton County, in the U.S. state of Ohio.

== History ==
Radcliff was founded 1879, and named for John Radcliff, the original owner of the town site. A post office was established at Radcliff in 1880, and remained in operation until 1994.
