= Stella, Ohio =

Coordinates: 39°20′55″N 82°33′07″W

Stella is an unincorporated community in Jackson Township, Vinton County, Ohio, in the United States.

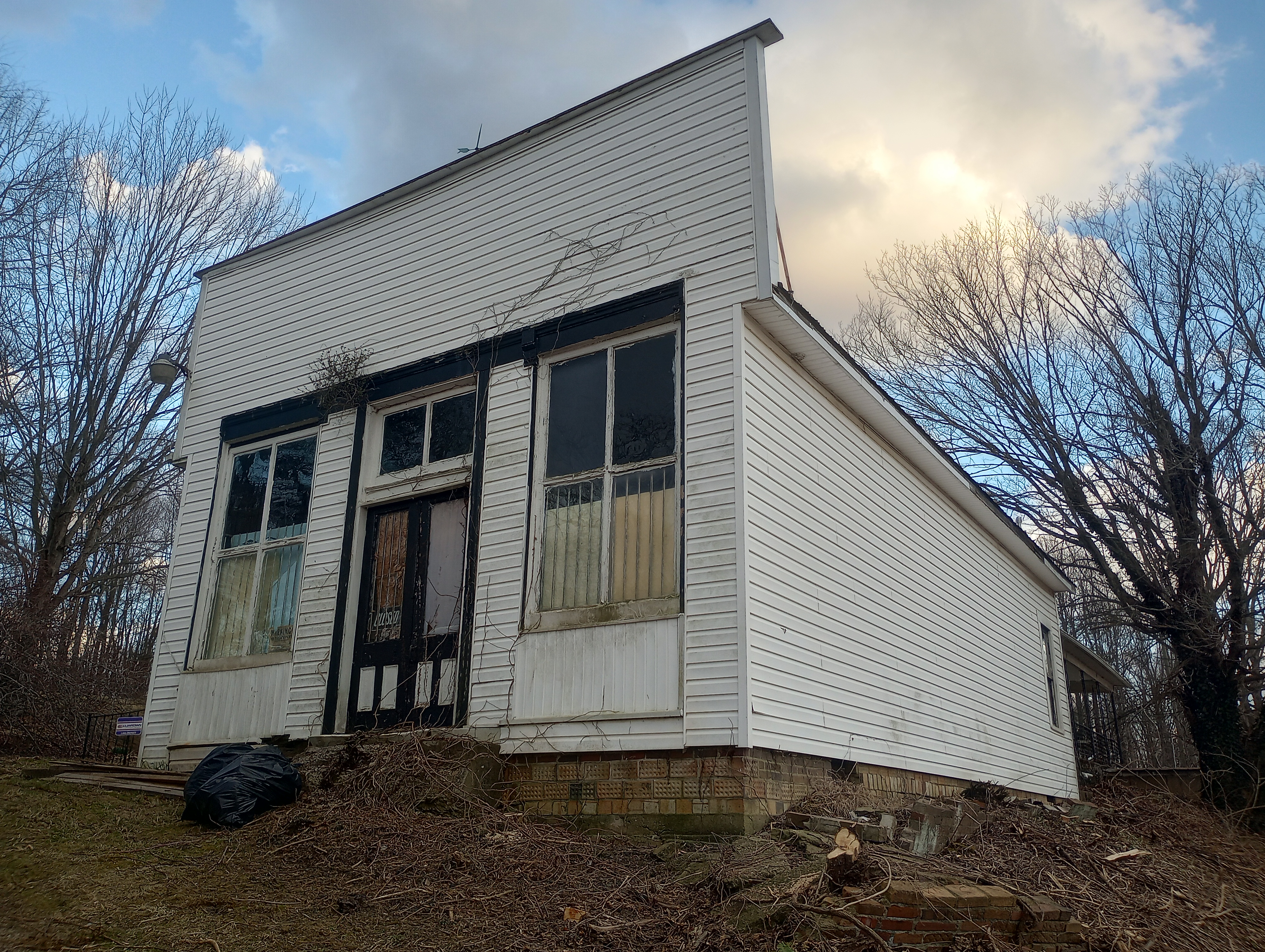
The old store building at the junctions of Siverly Creek and Locust Grove roads in Vinton County

== History ==
A post office was established at Stella in 1880, and remained in operation until 1907.
