= Siverly, Ohio =

Unincorporated community in Vinton County, Ohio

Coordinates: 39°20′56″N 82°30′00″W

Siverly is an unincorporated community in Swan Township, Vinton County, Ohio, in the United States.

== History ==
A post office called Siverly was established in 1869, and remained in operation until it was discontinued in 1898. The community was named for an early postmaster, John Silvery Witherspoon.
