= Elk Township, Vinton County, Ohio =

Township in Ohio, US

Elk Township, Ohio
- Township
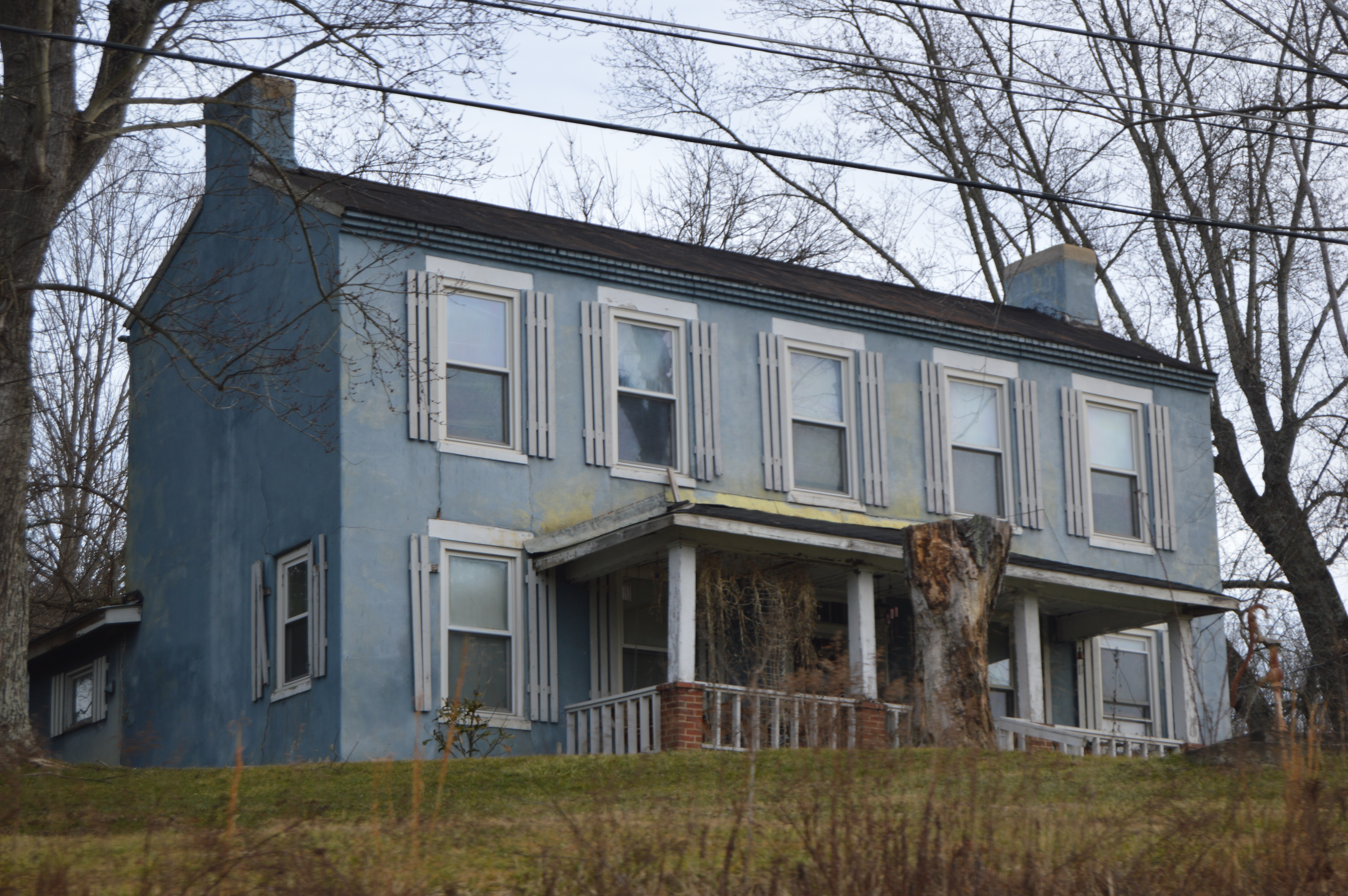
- Farmhouse on U.S. Route 50 east of McArthur

- Location in Vinton County and the state of Ohio.
- Coordinates: 39°14′52″N 82°28′19″W
- Country: United States
- State: Ohio
- County: Vinton

Area
  - Total: 38.1 sq mi (98.6 km^{2})
  - Land: 38.0 sq mi (98.5 km^{2})
  - Water: 0.039 sq mi (0.1 km^{2})
- Elevation: 738 ft (225 m)

Population (2020)
  - Total: 3,287
  - Density: 87/sq mi (33.4/km^{2})
- Time zone: UTC-5 (Eastern (EST))
  - Summer (DST): UTC-4 (EDT)
- FIPS code: 39-24892
- GNIS feature ID: 1087102

Elk Township is one of the twelve townships of Vinton County, Ohio, United States. The 2020 census found 3,287 people in the township, 1,783 of whom lived in the village of McArthur.

== Geography ==
Located in the center of the county, it borders the following townships:

- Swan Township: north
- Brown Township: northeast corner
- Madison Township: east
- Vinton Township: southeast corner
- Clinton Township: south
- Richland Township: west
- Jackson Township: northwest

It is one of only two townships in Vinton County without a border on other counties.

The village of McArthur, the county seat and largest village of Vinton County, is located in central Elk Township.

== Name and history ==
Elk Township was founded in 1811.

Statewide, the only other Elk Township is located in Noble County, plus an Elkrun Township in Columbiana County.

== Government ==
The township is governed by a three-member board of trustees, who are elected in November of odd-numbered years to a four-year term beginning on the following January 1. Two are elected in the year after the presidential election and one is elected in the year before it. There is also an elected township fiscal officer, who serves a four-year term beginning on April 1 of the year after the election, which is held in November of the year before the presidential election. Vacancies in the fiscal officership or on the board of trustees are filled by the remaining trustees.
