= Ratcliffburg, Ohio =

Unincorporated community in Ohio, U.S.

Coordinates: 39°15′46″N 82°40′53″W

Ratcliffburg is an unincorporated community in Vinton County, in the U.S. state of Ohio.

== History ==
A post office operated under the name Ratcliffburg(h) between 1850 and 1903. Ratcliffburg once contained a one-room schoolhouse.
