= Clinton Township, Vinton County, Ohio =

Township in Ohio, US

- Township
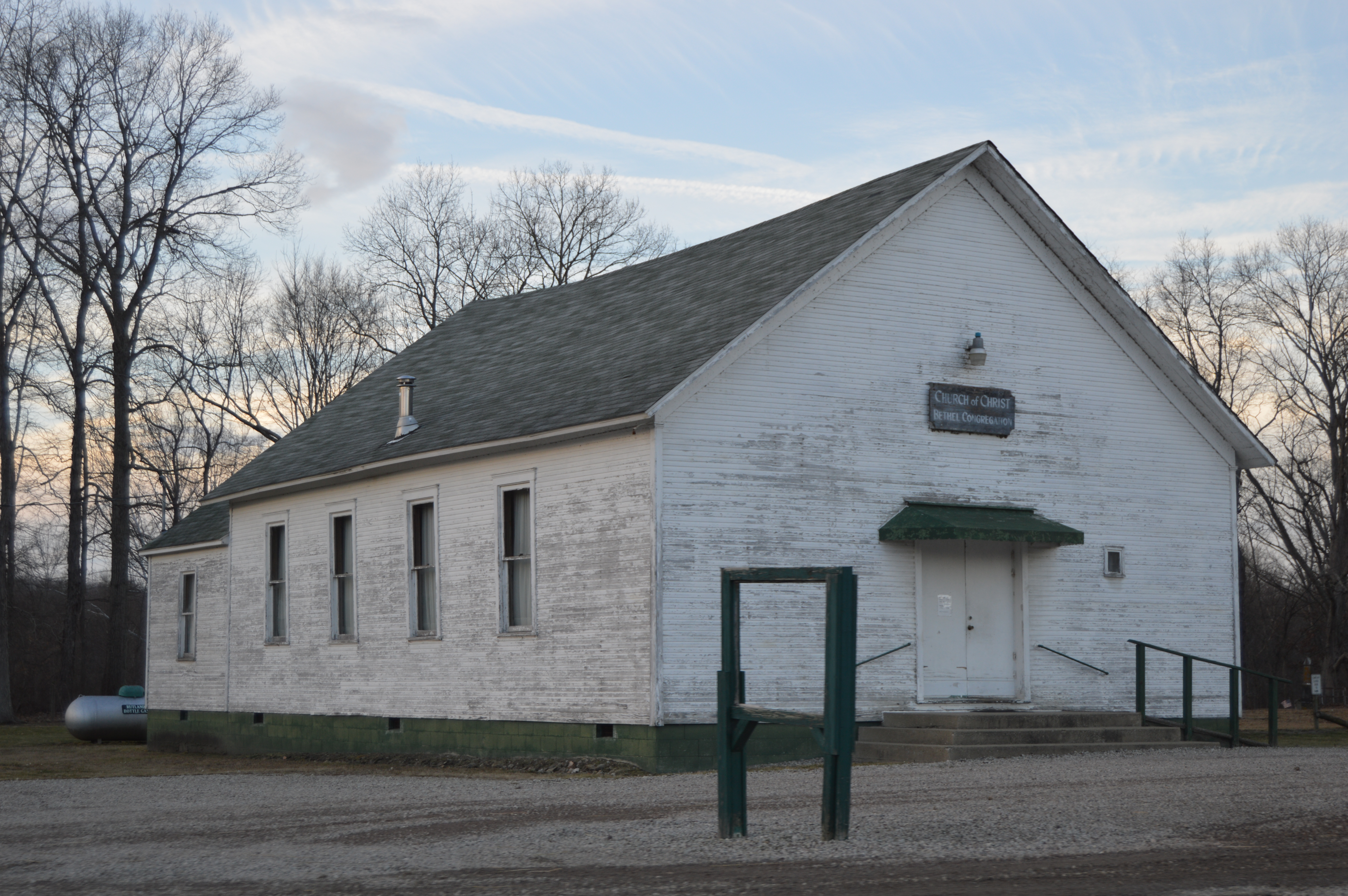
- Bethel Church of Christ on State Route 93

- Location in Vinton County and the state of Ohio.
- Coordinates: 39°10′16″N 82°30′1″W
- Country: United States
- State: Ohio
- County: Vinton

Area
  - Total: 31.6 sq mi (81.9 km^{2})
  - Land: 31.0 sq mi (80.4 km^{2})
  - Water: 0.58 sq mi (1.5 km^{2})
- Elevation: 774 ft (236 m)

Population (2020)
  - Total: 1,847
  - Density: 60/sq mi (23/km^{2})
- Time zone: UTC-5 (Eastern (EST))
  - Summer (DST): UTC-4 (EDT)
- FIPS code: 39-16210
- GNIS feature ID: 1087100

Clinton Township is one of the twelve townships of Vinton County, Ohio, United States. The 2020 census found 1,847 people in the township, 727 of whom lived in the village of Hamden.

== Geography ==
Located in the southern part of the township, it borders the following townships:

- Elk Township: north
- Madison Township: northeast corner
- Vinton Township: east
- Milton Township, Jackson County: south
- Washington Township, Jackson County: southwest
- Richland Township: northwest

Hamden, the second-largest village in Vinton County, is located in southwestern Clinton Township.

== Name and history ==
It is one of seven Clinton Townships statewide.

== Government ==
The township is governed by a three-member board of trustees, who are elected in November of odd-numbered years to a four-year term beginning on the following January 1. Two are elected in the year after the presidential election and one is elected in the year before it. There is also an elected township fiscal officer, who serves a four-year term beginning on April 1 of the year after the election, which is held in November of the year before the presidential election. Vacancies in the fiscal officership or on the board of trustees are filled by the remaining trustees.
