= Eagle Township, Vinton County, Ohio =

Township in Ohio, US

- Township
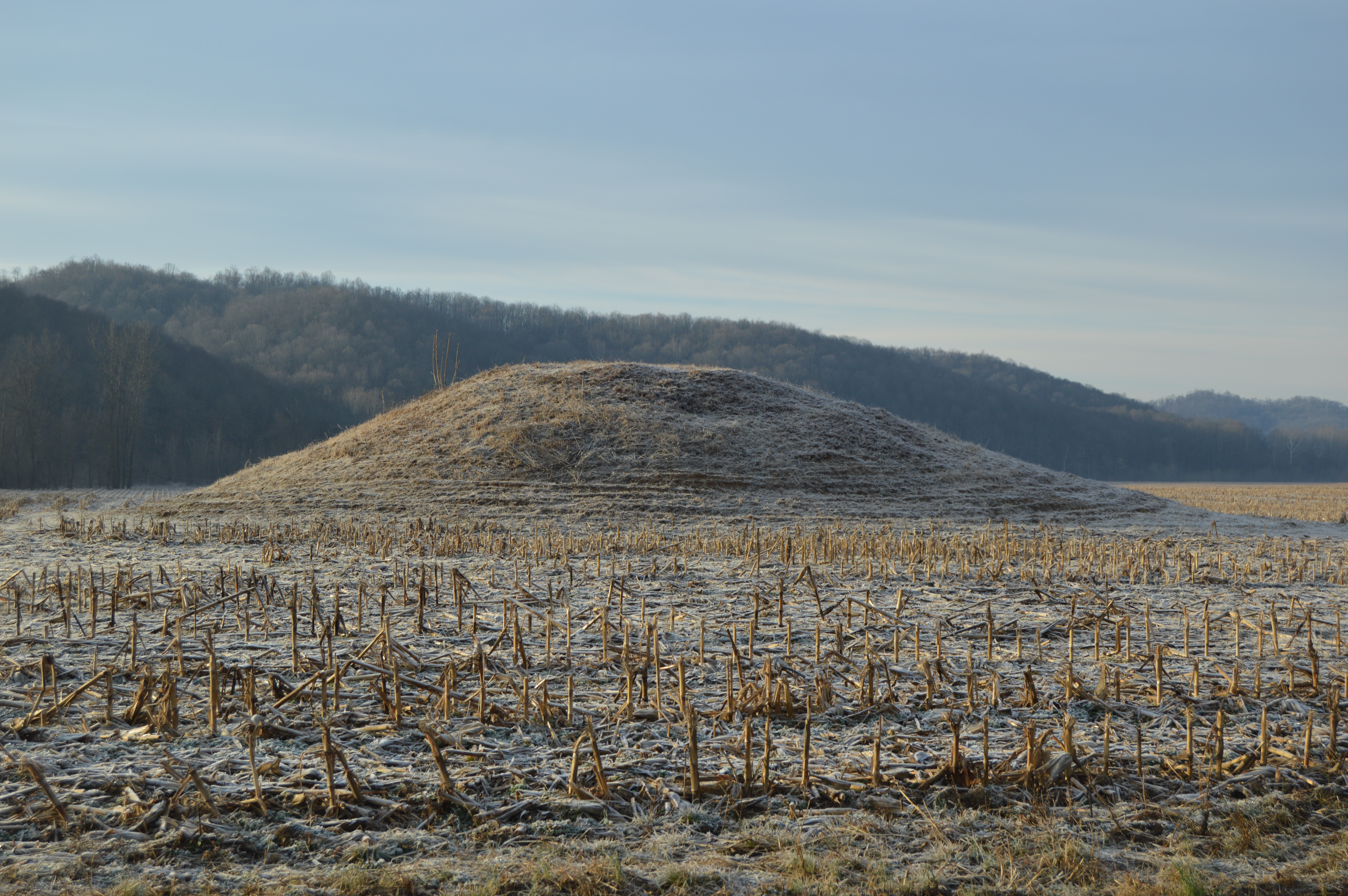
- Ratcliffe Indian Mound on State Route 327

- Location in Vinton County and the state of Ohio.
- Coordinates: 39°20′17″N 82°40′57″W
- Country: United States
- State: Ohio
- County: Vinton

Area
  - Total: 32.7 sq mi (84.6 km^{2})
  - Land: 32.7 sq mi (84.6 km^{2})
  - Water: 0 sq mi (0.0 km^{2})
- Elevation: 801 ft (244 m)

Population (2020)
  - Total: 667
  - Density: 20.4/sq mi (7.88/km^{2})
- Time zone: UTC-5 (Eastern (EST))
  - Summer (DST): UTC-4 (EDT)
- FIPS code: 39-23100
- GNIS feature ID: 1087101
- Website: https://eagletwp.com/

Eagle Township is one of the twelve townships of Vinton County, Ohio, United States. The 2020 census found 667 people in the township.

== Geography ==
Located in the northwestern corner of the county, it borders the following townships:

- Salt Creek Township, Hocking County: north
- Jackson Township: east
- Richland Township: southeast corner
- Harrison Township: south
- Liberty Township, Ross County: southwest
- Harrison Township, Ross County: west

No municipalities are located in Eagle Township.

== Name and history ==
Statewide, other Eagle Townships are located in Brown and Hancock counties.

== Government ==
The township is governed by a three-member board of trustees, who are elected in November of odd-numbered years to a four-year term beginning on the following January 1. Two are elected in the year after the presidential election and one is elected in the year before it. There is also an elected township fiscal officer, who serves a four-year term beginning on April 1 of the year after the election, which is held in November of the year before the presidential election. Vacancies in the fiscal officership or on the board of trustees are filled by the remaining trustees.
