= Jackson Township, Vinton County, Ohio =

Township in Ohio, US

- Township
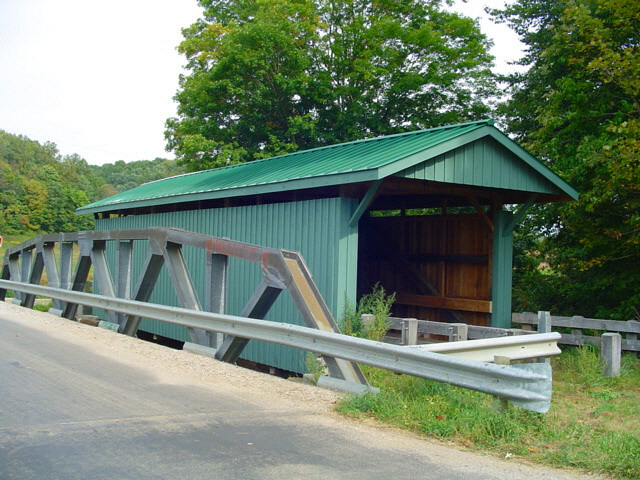
- Mt. Olive Road Covered Bridge, a historic site in the township

- Location in Vinton County and the state of Ohio.
- Coordinates: 39°19′23″N 82°35′0″W
- Country: United States
- State: Ohio
- County: Vinton

Area
  - Total: 37.5 sq mi (97.2 km^{2})
  - Land: 37.5 sq mi (97.2 km^{2})
  - Water: 0 sq mi (0.0 km^{2})
- Elevation: 883 ft (269 m)

Population (2020)
  - Total: 721
  - Density: 19.2/sq mi (7.42/km^{2})
- Time zone: UTC-5 (Eastern (EST))
  - Summer (DST): UTC-4 (EDT)
- FIPS code: 39-38136
- GNIS feature ID: 1087104

Jackson Township is one of the twelve townships of Vinton County, Ohio, United States. The 2020 census found 721 people in the township.

== Geography ==
Located in the northern part of the county, it borders the following townships:

- Benton Township, Hocking County: north
- Swan Township: east
- Elk Township: southeast
- Richland Township: south
- Harrison Township: southwest corner
- Eagle Township: west
- Salt Creek Township, Hocking County: northwest

No municipalities are located in Jackson Township, but it does contain the unincorporated community of Stella.

== Name and history ==
Jackson Township was organized in 1831.

It is one of thirty-seven Jackson Townships statewide.

== Government ==
The township is governed by a three-member board of trustees, who are elected in November of odd-numbered years to a four-year term beginning on the following January 1. Two are elected in the year after the presidential election and one is elected in the year before it. There is also an elected township fiscal officer, who serves a four-year term beginning on April 1 of the year after the election, which is held in November of the year before the presidential election. Vacancies in the fiscal officership or on the board of trustees are filled by the remaining trustees.
