= Brown Township, Vinton County, Ohio =

Township in Ohio, US

- Township
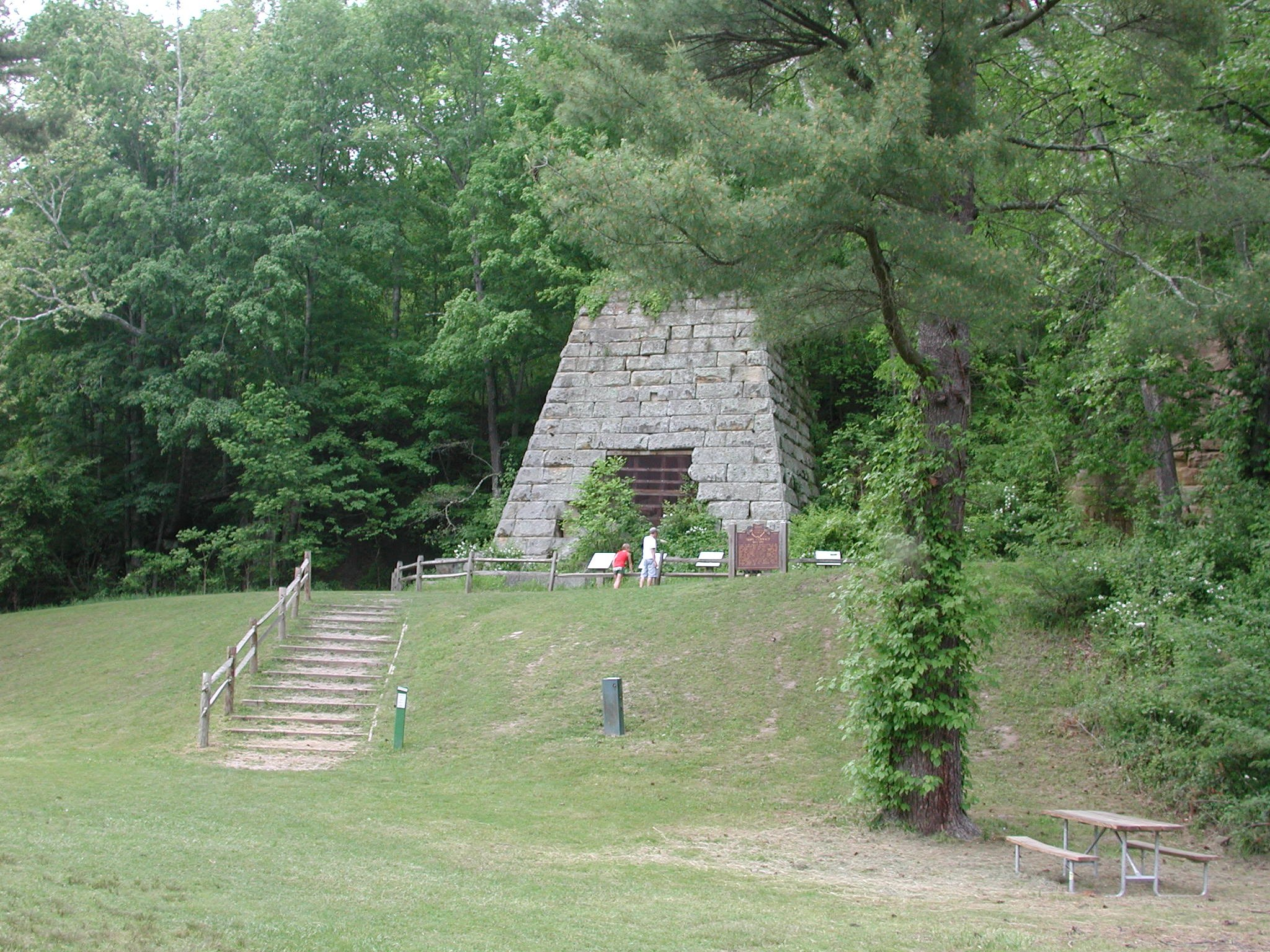
- Hope Furnace, a historic site in Brown Township

- Location in Vinton County and the state of Ohio.
- Coordinates: 39°20′25″N 82°20′53″W
- Country: United States
- State: Ohio
- County: Vinton

Area
  - Total: 37.0 sq mi (95.8 km^{2})
  - Land: 36.8 sq mi (95.3 km^{2})
  - Water: 0.19 sq mi (0.5 km^{2})
- Elevation: 909 ft (277 m)

Population (2020)
  - Total: 255
  - Density: 7.0/sq mi (2.7/km^{2})
- Time zone: UTC-5 (Eastern (EST))
  - Summer (DST): UTC-4 (EDT)
- FIPS code: 39-09526
- GNIS feature ID: 1087099

Brown Township is one of the twelve townships of Vinton County, Ohio, United States. The 2020 census found 255 people in the township.

== Geography ==
Located in the northeastern corner of the county, it borders the following townships:

- Starr Township, Hocking County: north
- York Township, Athens County: northeast corner
- Waterloo Township, Athens County: east
- Knox Township: southeast
- Madison Township: south
- Vinton Township: southwest corner
- Swan Township: west
- Washington Township, Hocking County: northwest

No municipalities are located in Brown Township, although the unincorporated communities of Ingham, Moonville, and New Plymouth lie in the township's southeast, southeast, and northwest respectively.

== Name and history ==
It is one of eight Brown Townships statewide.

== Government ==
The township is governed by a three-member board of trustees, who are elected in November of odd-numbered years to a four-year term beginning on the following January 1. Two are elected in the year after the presidential election and one is elected in the year before it. There is also an elected township fiscal officer, who serves a four-year term beginning on April 1 of the year after the election, which is held in November of the year before the presidential election. Vacancies in the fiscal officership or on the board of trustees are filled by the remaining trustees.
