= Moonville, Ohio =

Ghost town

Coordinates: 39°18′24″N 82°19′17″W

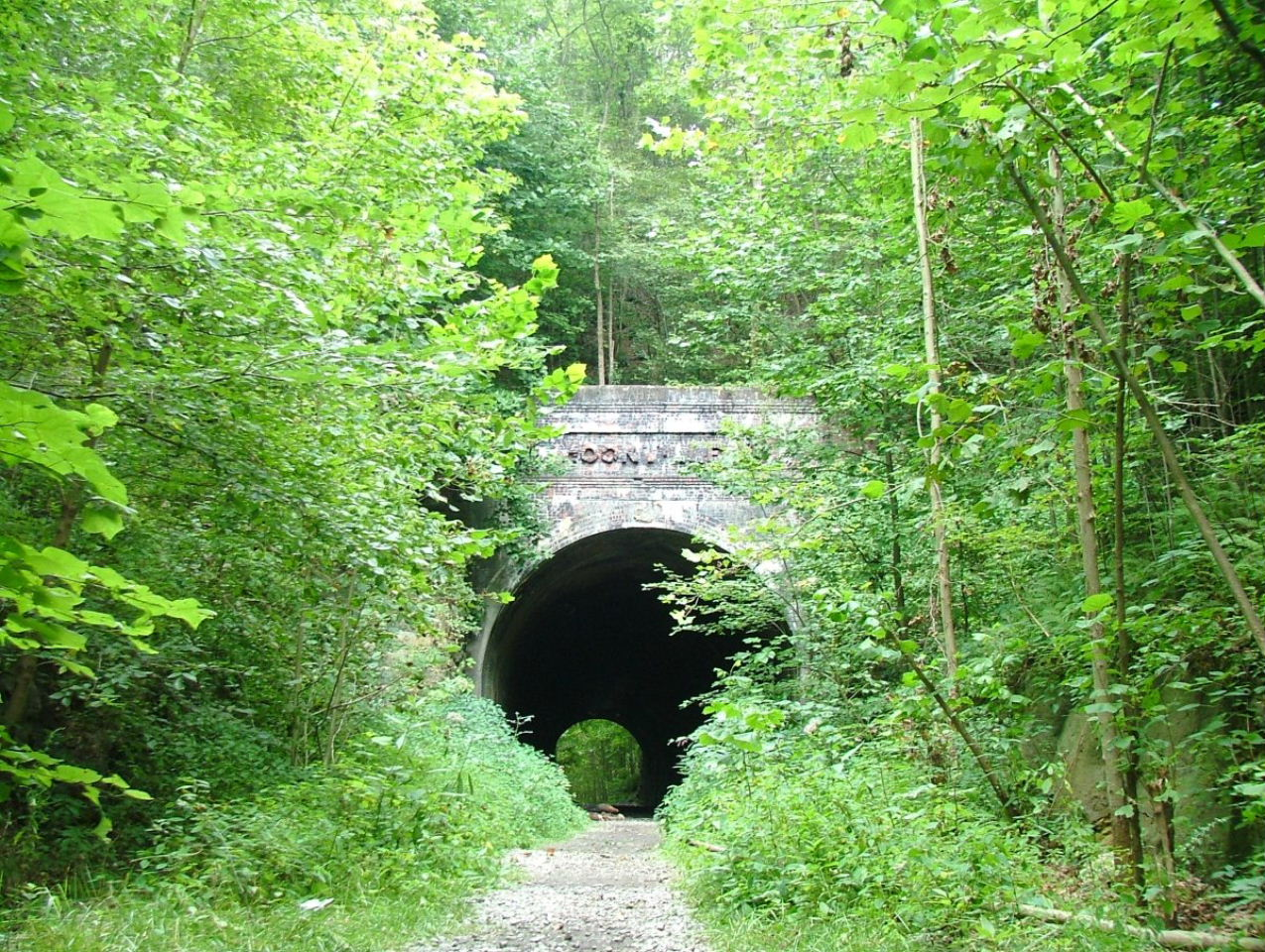
West entrance of the Moonville Tunnel

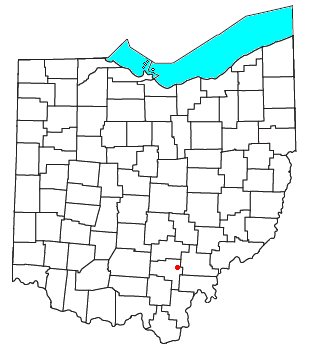
Location of Moonville, Ohio

Moonville is a ghost town in southeastern Brown Township, Vinton County, Ohio, United States. Little remains of this former mining community except a few foundations, a cemetery, and an abandoned railroad tunnel Moonville Tunnel which is the subject of numerous ghost stories.

== History ==
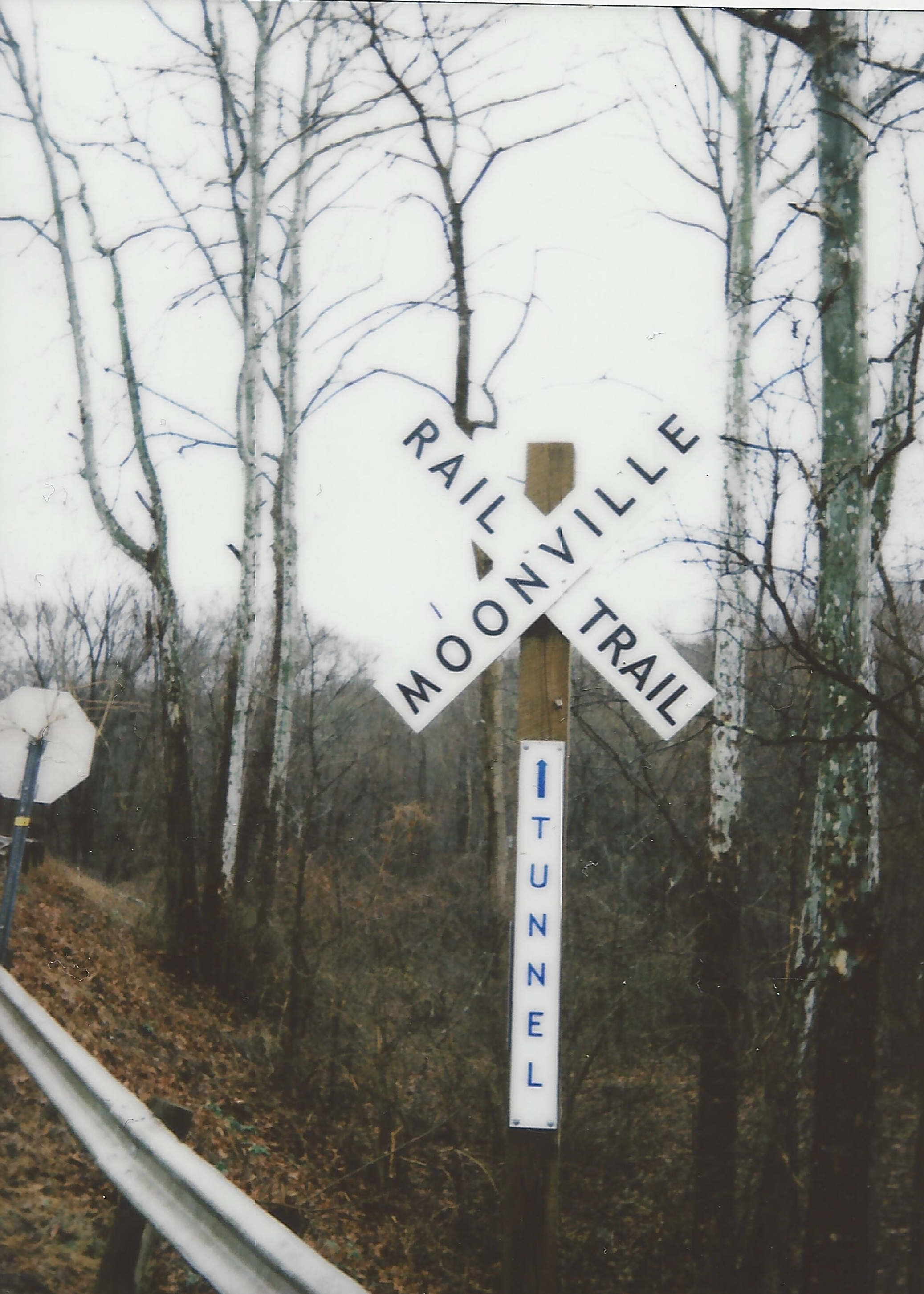
Sign denoting the entrance to the Moonville rail-trail, located just before the bridge to the East entrance to the tunnel

In the mid-1800s, the Marietta and Cincinnati Railroad (M&C) was pushing through southeastern Ohio to reach Cincinnati. Along its route and in the more remote sections were the towns of Zaleski, Hope Furnace, Hope Furnace Station, Ingham Station, and Kings Station. Central to these small coal mining towns was also a small community mainly made up of two families, the Coes and Fergusons. It was called Moonville. Nearby, the railroad company built two trestles over the winding Raccoon Creek and gouged a tunnel, called Moonville Tunnel, through one high hill. Walking the tracks was incredibly dangerous, and was made even more hazardous by the trestles and tunnel. One trestle stood over Raccoon Creek less than 50 yards (46 m) away from the tunnel mouth. Over 21 people were killed on or near the tracks here. The last fatality was reportedly in 1978 when a 13-year-old girl fell off the trestle as a train passed over it.

By the turn of the century, the coal mines slowly started to be used up and closed down. The last family left town in 1947; by then the town itself was abandoned. By the 1960s all the buildings were gone and there was little to mark the site, other than Moonville Cemetery, the tunnel, and foundation stones found near the tracks.

== Legends ==
The legends of the Moonville Tunnel include several tales of ghosts that allegedly still haunt visitors to this day. The legends include four different ghosts: The Engineer, The Brakeman, The Lavender Lady, and The Bully.

The Engineer

The ghost of Theodore Lawhead, an engineer for the Marietta and Cincinnati railroad company began to haunt the tracks after his train collided head-on with an oncoming train in the 1880s. Visitors have seen a ghostly figure holding a lantern while walking alongside the track and through the tunnel.

The Brakeman

The Brakeman is believed to be the ghost of a drunken young man who was working on a train as a brakeman. The young man had consumed too much liquor one night and fell asleep on the tracks.

The Lavender Lady

Visitors of the Moonville Tunnel have seen thin, elderly women walking alongside the trail. Shortly after, she disappears and the scent of lavender fills the air. It is believed to be Mary Shea, who was killed on the tracks at the far end of the tunnel.

The Bully

The Bully is believed to be the ghost of Baldie Keeton. Baldie Keeton was a resident of Moonville. The legend says that Baldie was a man that liked to fight when he got drunk. The legend also says that one of Baldie's tactics was to bear hug his opponent. When Baldie was at the saloon he decided to fight, and a group of men kicked Baldie out. Later, he was found dead on the tracks. Many believe it was murder. The legend now says that the ghost of Baldie Keeton stands above the tunnel and stares at the approaching visitors. He will sometimes throw pebbles. The legend of The Bully was also told by young mothers to their children and the mothers also used to tell their children to not stay out at night or else "The Bully" would get them.

== The demise of the line ==
With the town long gone, the train traffic continued to increase on the single-track line. In 1973 the B&O merged with the Chesapeake and Ohio Railway (C&O) and the Western Maryland Railway (WM) to form the Chessie System. Train traffic doubled, with as many as 14 trains per day.

Railroad workers called the line the most lonesome, desolate eight miles (13 km) of track between Parkersburg, West Virginia and St. Louis. They hated the area because it was isolated and trains seemed to show up without warning. The line was "dark" (unsignaled) between Parkersburg and Cincinnati, and traffic was governed by train orders.

In 1981, a signal was erected at Moonville. The railroad said that if a railroad worker needed to stop a train, they had to use this signal, not a flashlight or lantern. Engineers and conductors were ordered not to go into emergency unless the signal was red.

In June 1985, CSX announced that the line between Cumberland, Maryland and Cincinnati would be reduced to secondary status, and the last scheduled freight train passed through Moonville in August. Trains continued to run until the line was abandoned and the rails pulled up in 1988. The area remains accessible and the old roadbed provides access to the Moonville Tunnel. Plans to turn the area into a formal rail trail, the Moonville Rail-Trail, have been implemented. Six and a half miles of trail are currently open, with nine and a half miles, plus twelve bridges, still needed.

== Events ==
There is a Halloween and ghost-themed festival known as Midnight at Moonville located on the old railroad bed and in the tunnel.
