= Harrison Township, Vinton County, Ohio =

Township in Ohio, US

- Township
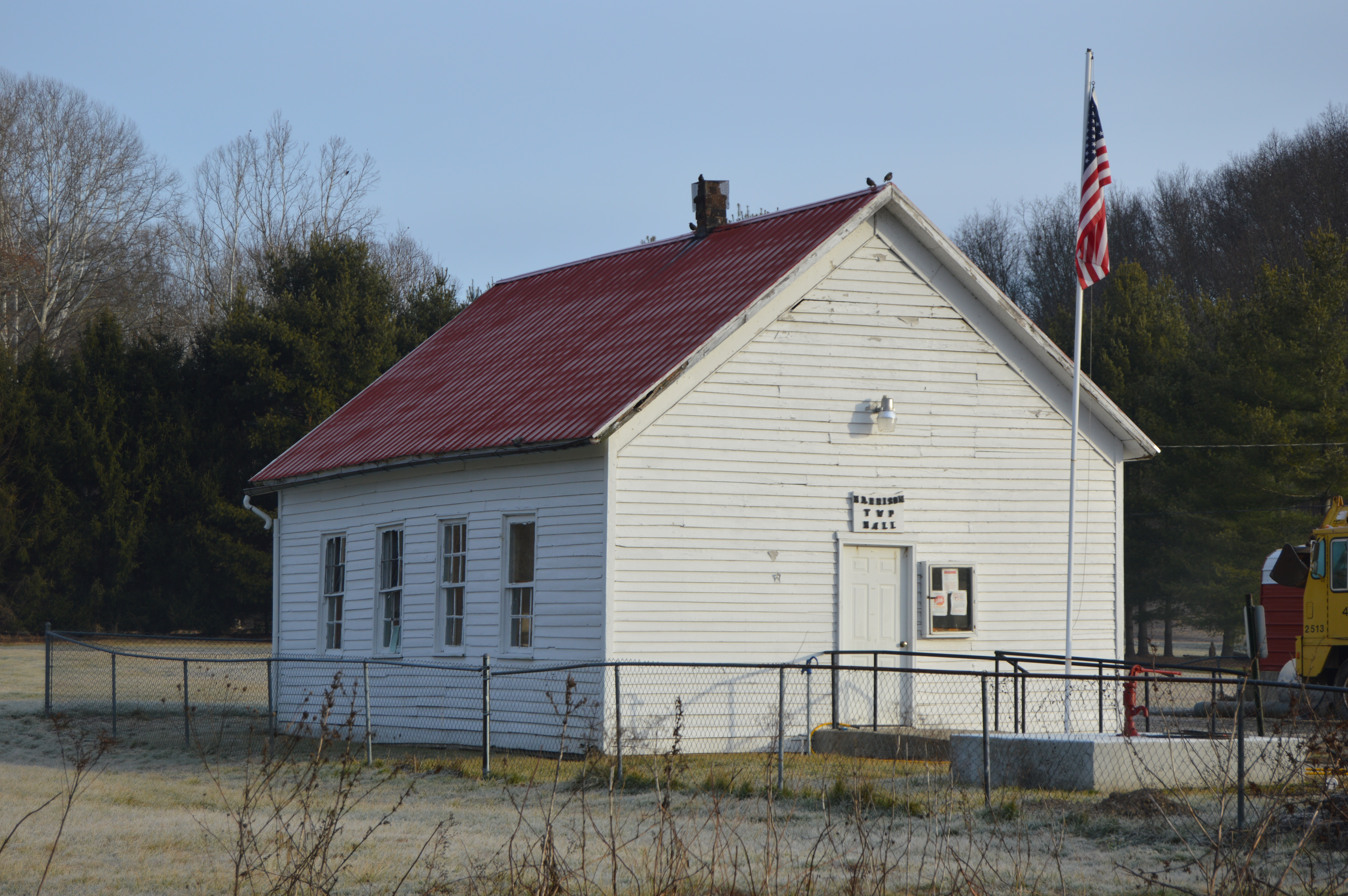
- Township hall on U.S. Route 50

- Location in Vinton County and the state of Ohio.
- Coordinates: 39°14′11″N 82°42′7″W
- Country: United States
- State: Ohio
- County: Vinton

Area
  - Total: 34.1 sq mi (88.3 km^{2})
  - Land: 34.1 sq mi (88.2 km^{2})
  - Water: 0 sq mi (0.0 km^{2})
- Elevation: 614 ft (187 m)

Population (2020)
  - Total: 1,084
  - Density: 32/sq mi (12.3/km^{2})
- Time zone: UTC-5 (Eastern (EST))
  - Summer (DST): UTC-4 (EDT)
- FIPS code: 39-34048
- GNIS feature ID: 1087103

Harrison Township is one of the twelve townships of Vinton County, Ohio, United States. The 2020 census found 1,084 people in the township.

== Geography ==
Located in the southwestern corner of the county, it borders the following townships:

- Eagle Township: north
- Jackson Township: northeast corner
- Richland Township: east
- Jackson Township, Jackson County: south
- Liberty Township, Ross County: southwest
- Jefferson Township, Ross County: northwest

Harrison Township lies farther west than any other location in Vinton County.

No municipalities are located in Harrison Township, although the unincorporated community of Ray lies in the township's southeast.

== Name and history ==
It is one of nineteen Harrison Townships statewide.

== Government ==
The township is governed by a three-member board of trustees, who are elected in November of odd-numbered years to a four-year term beginning on the following January 1. Two are elected in the year after the presidential election and one is elected in the year before it. There is also an elected township fiscal officer, who serves a four-year term beginning on April 1 of the year after the election, which is held in November of the year before the presidential election. Vacancies in the fiscal officership or on the board of trustees are filled by the remaining trustees.
