= Allensville, Ohio =

Unincorporated community in Ohio, U.S.

Coordinates: 39°16′21″N 82°36′25″W

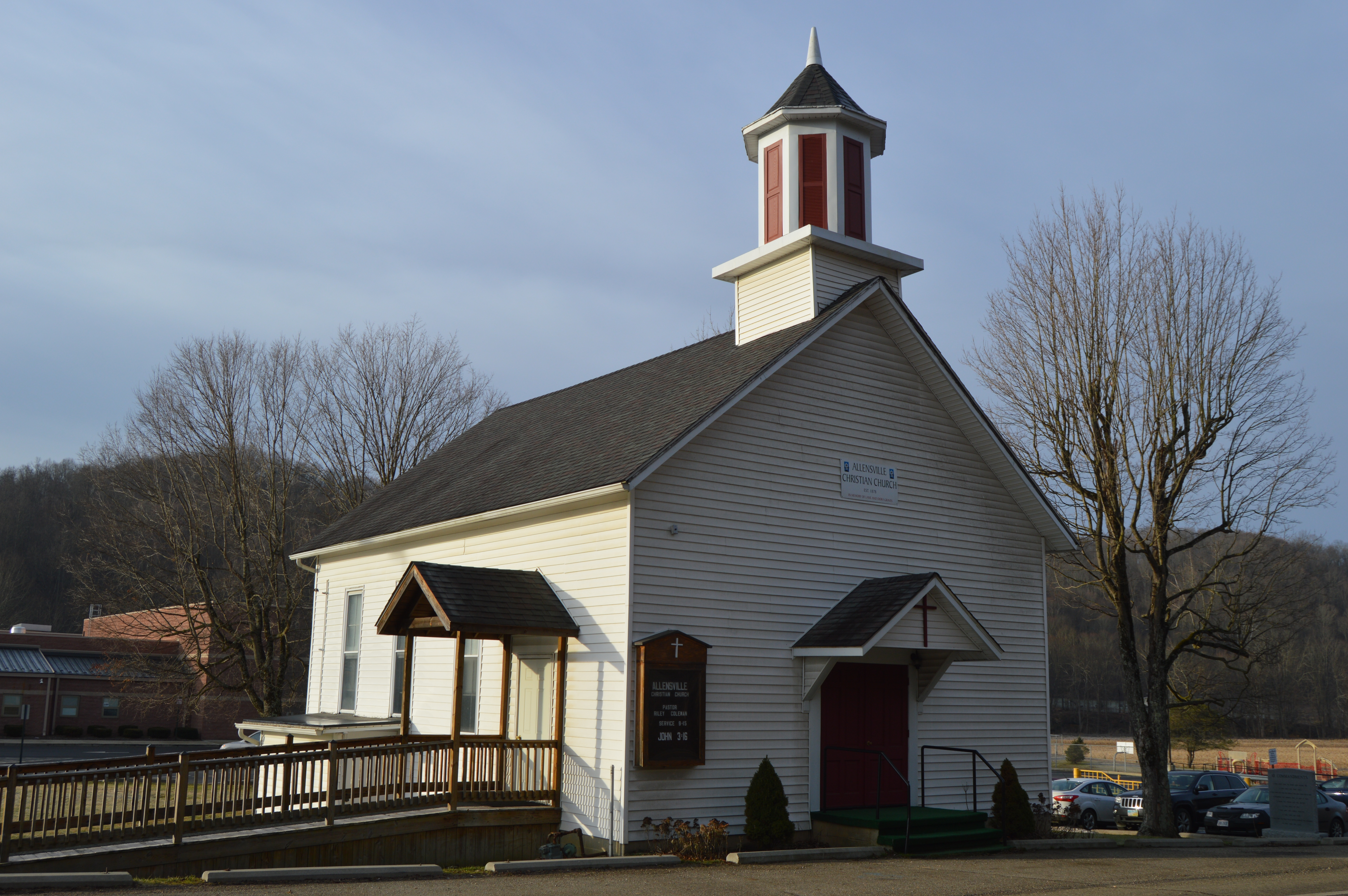
Allensville Christian Church

Allensville is an unincorporated community in Richland Township, Vinton County, Ohio, in the United States.

== History ==
Allensville was laid out in 1837, and named after William Allen, a state legislator. The first post office in Allensville was established in 1839.
