= Wilkesville, Ohio =

- Village
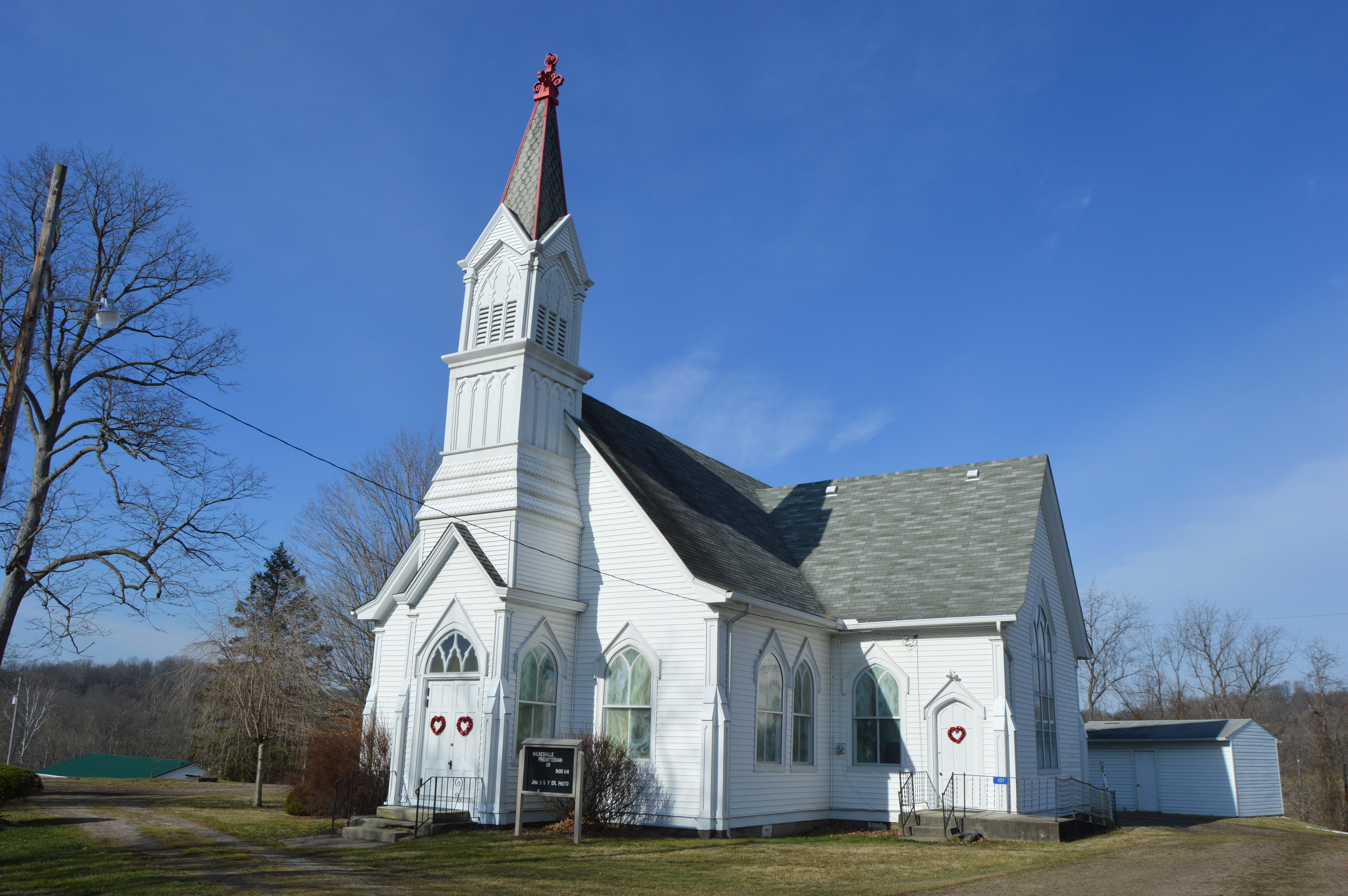
- Presbyterian church

- Location in Vinton County and the state of Ohio.

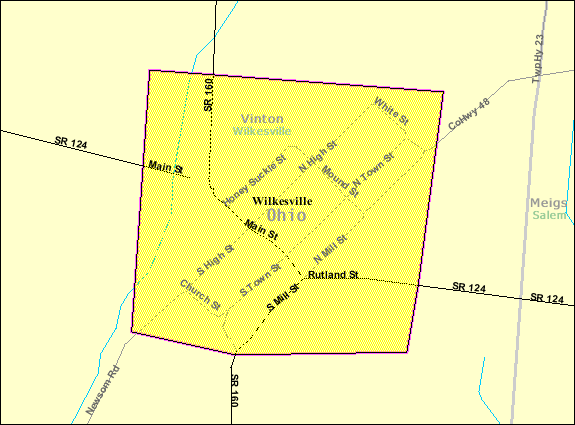
- Detailed map of Wilkesville
- Coordinates: 39°04′35″N 82°19′39″W
- Country: United States
- State: Ohio
- County: Vinton
- Township: Wilkesville
- Established: 1810
- Incorporated: 1881

Area
  - Total: 0.26 sq mi (0.67 km^{2})
  - Land: 0.26 sq mi (0.67 km^{2})
  - Water: 0 sq mi (0.00 km^{2})
- Elevation: 725 ft (221 m)

Population (2020)
  - Total: 116
  - Density: 448/sq mi (173.1/km^{2})
- Time zone: UTC-5 (Eastern (EST))
  - Summer (DST): UTC-4 (EDT)
- ZIP code: 45695
- Area code: 740
- FIPS code: 39-85190
- GNIS feature ID: 2400170

Wilkesville is a village in Vinton County, Ohio, United States. The population was 116 at the 2020 census.

== History ==
Wilkesville was laid out in 1810. It was named after one Mr. Wilkes, the original owner of the town site. A post office called Wilkesville has been in operation since 1819. The post office closed in 2021 Wilkesville was incorporated as a village in 1881.

== Geography ==
According to the United States Census Bureau, the village has a total area of 0.29 square miles (0.75 km^{2}), all land.

== Demographics ==
Historical population
Census	Pop.	Note	%±
1880	309		—
1890	262		−15.2%
1900	223		−14.9%
1910	203		−9.0%
1920	224		10.3%
1930	221		−1.3%
1940	245		10.9%
1950	203		−17.1%
1960	190		−6.4%
1970	181		−4.7%
1980	189		4.4%
1990	151		−20.1%
2000	151		0.0%
2010	149		−1.3%
2020	116		−22.1%
U.S. Decennial Census

=== 2010 census ===
As of the census of 2010, there were 149 people, 69 households, and 43 families living in the village. The population density was 513.8 inhabitants per square mile (198.4/km^{2}). There were 78 housing units at an average density of 269.0 per square mile (103.9/km^{2}). The racial makeup of the village was 99.3% White and 0.7% African American. Hispanic or Latino of any race were 2.7% of the population.

There were 69 households, of which 24.6% had children under the age of 18 living with them, 46.4% were married couples living together, 11.6% had a female householder with no husband present, 4.3% had a male householder with no wife present, and 37.7% were non-families. 36.2% of all households were made up of individuals, and 11.5% had someone living alone who was 65 years of age or older. The average household size was 2.16 and the average family size was 2.72.

The median age in the village was 42.8 years. 20.8% of residents were under the age of 18; 6.1% were between the ages of 18 and 24; 25.4% were from 25 to 44; 30.2% were from 45 to 64; and 17.4% were 65 years of age or older. The gender makeup of the village was 55.0% male and 45.0% female.

=== 2000 census ===
As of the census of 2000, there were 151 people, 70 households, and 41 families living in the village. The population density was 513.7 inhabitants per square mile (198.3/km^{2}). There were 82 housing units at an average density of 278.9 per square mile (107.7/km^{2}). The racial makeup of the village was 95.36% White, 2.65% Native American, and 1.99% from two or more races.

There were 70 households, out of which 24.3% had children under the age of 18 living with them, 47.1% were married couples living together, 7.1% had a female householder with no husband present, and 41.4% were non-families. 40.0% of all households were made up of individuals, and 21.4% had someone living alone who was 65 years of age or older. The average household size was 2.16 and the average family size was 2.88.

In the village, the population was spread out, with 20.5% under the age of 18, 5.3% from 18 to 24, 23.8% from 25 to 44, 29.1% from 45 to 64, and 21.2% who were 65 years of age or older. The median age was 45 years. For every 100 females there were 93.6 males. For every 100 females age 18 and over, there were 93.5 males.

The median income for a household in the village was $22,188, and the median income for a family was $36,875. Males had a median income of $35,179 versus $33,125 for females. The per capita income for the village was $16,274. There were 16.7% of families and 18.8% of the population living below the poverty line, including 16.0% of under eighteens and 27.6% of those over 64.
