= McArthur, Ohio =

- Village
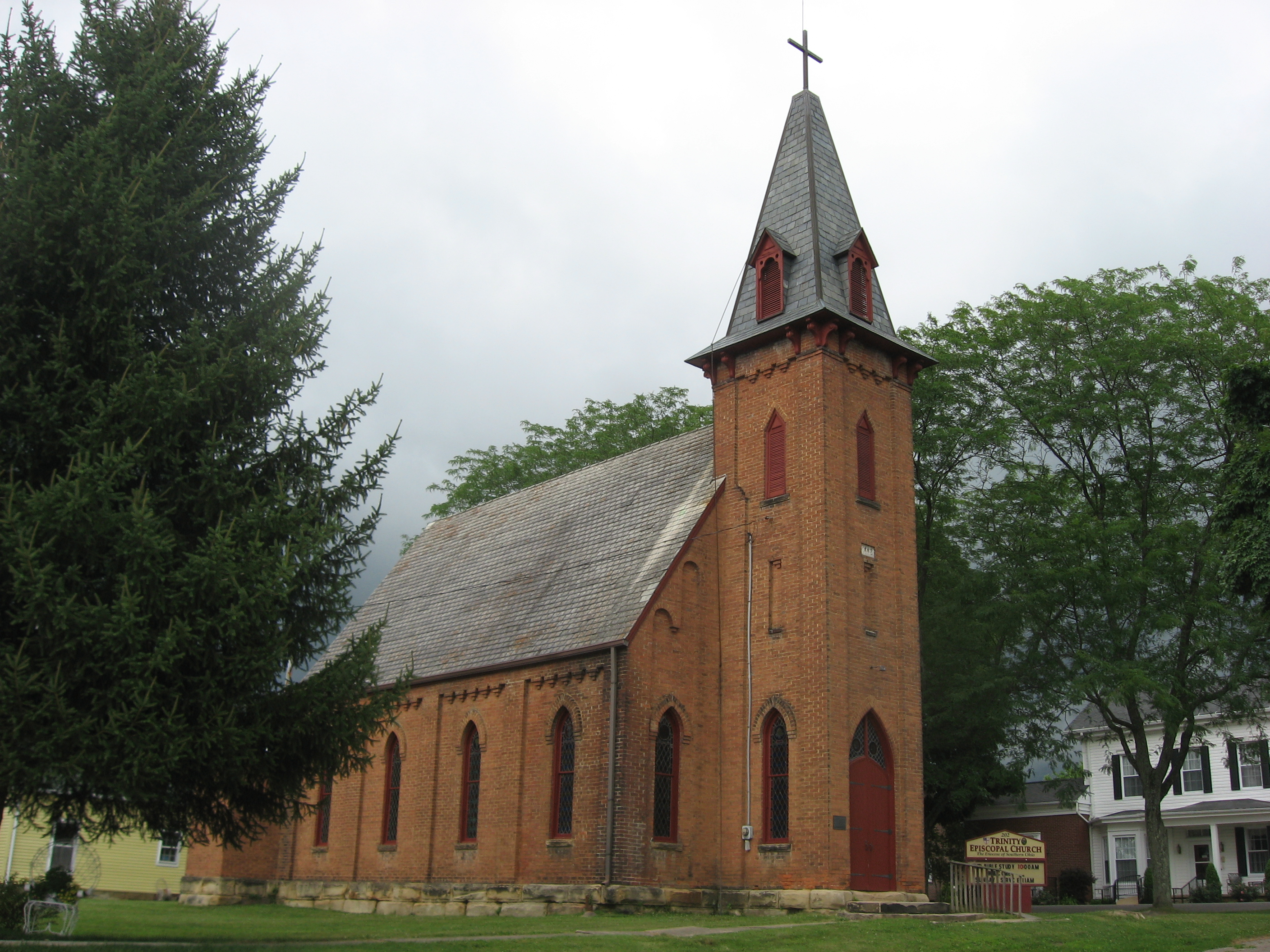
- Trinity Episcopal Church, a McArthur historic site
- Interactive map of McArthur, Ohio
- Location within Ohio Location within the United States
- Coordinates: 39°14′55″N 82°28′42″W
- Country: United States
- State: Ohio
- County: Vinton
- Township: Elk
- Platted: 1815
- Named for: Duncan McArthur

Area
  - Total: 1.69 sq mi (4.39 km^{2})
  - Land: 1.69 sq mi (4.37 km^{2})
  - Water: 0.0077 sq mi (0.02 km^{2})
- Elevation: 768 ft (234 m)

Population (2020)
  - Total: 1,783
  - Density: 1,057.2/sq mi (408.19/km^{2})
- Time zone: UTC-5 (Eastern (EST))
  - Summer (DST): UTC-4 (EDT)
- ZIP code: 45651
- Area code: 740
- FIPS code: 39-45696
- GNIS feature ID: 2399283

McArthur is a village in and the county seat of Vinton County, Ohio, United States. It is located 27 miles (43 km) southeast of Chillicothe. The population was 1,783 at the 2020 census.

== History ==
McArthur was laid out and platted in 1815. It was originally called McArthurstown and was named for Duncan McArthur, an army general in the War of 1812. The oldest surviving building is the McArthur Hotel, which was built in 1839.

The Vinton County Convention and Visitors Bureau (CVB) purchased the McArthur Hotel in December 2021, from Kathryn Matteson, the previous owner. In 2022, the Vinton County CVB began a revitalization project on the McArthur Hotel. On July 8, 2025, a fire inside the McArthur Hotel led to extensive damages. The building was declared a "total loss" by insurance companies. Cleanup and renovation begun in 2026, while attempting to maintain as much of the historic, external construction as possible. An agreement was formed between Dakota Dunn and Stellar Films to document the entire renovation, with hopes to pitch it to major television networks such as HGTV and The History Channel.

== Geography ==
McArthur is located at the junction of U.S. Route 50 and Ohio State Route 93.

According to the United States Census Bureau, the village has a total area of 1.34 square miles (3.47 km^{2}), of which 1.33 square miles (3.44 km^{2}) is land and 0.01 square miles (0.03 km^{2}) is water.

== Demographics ==
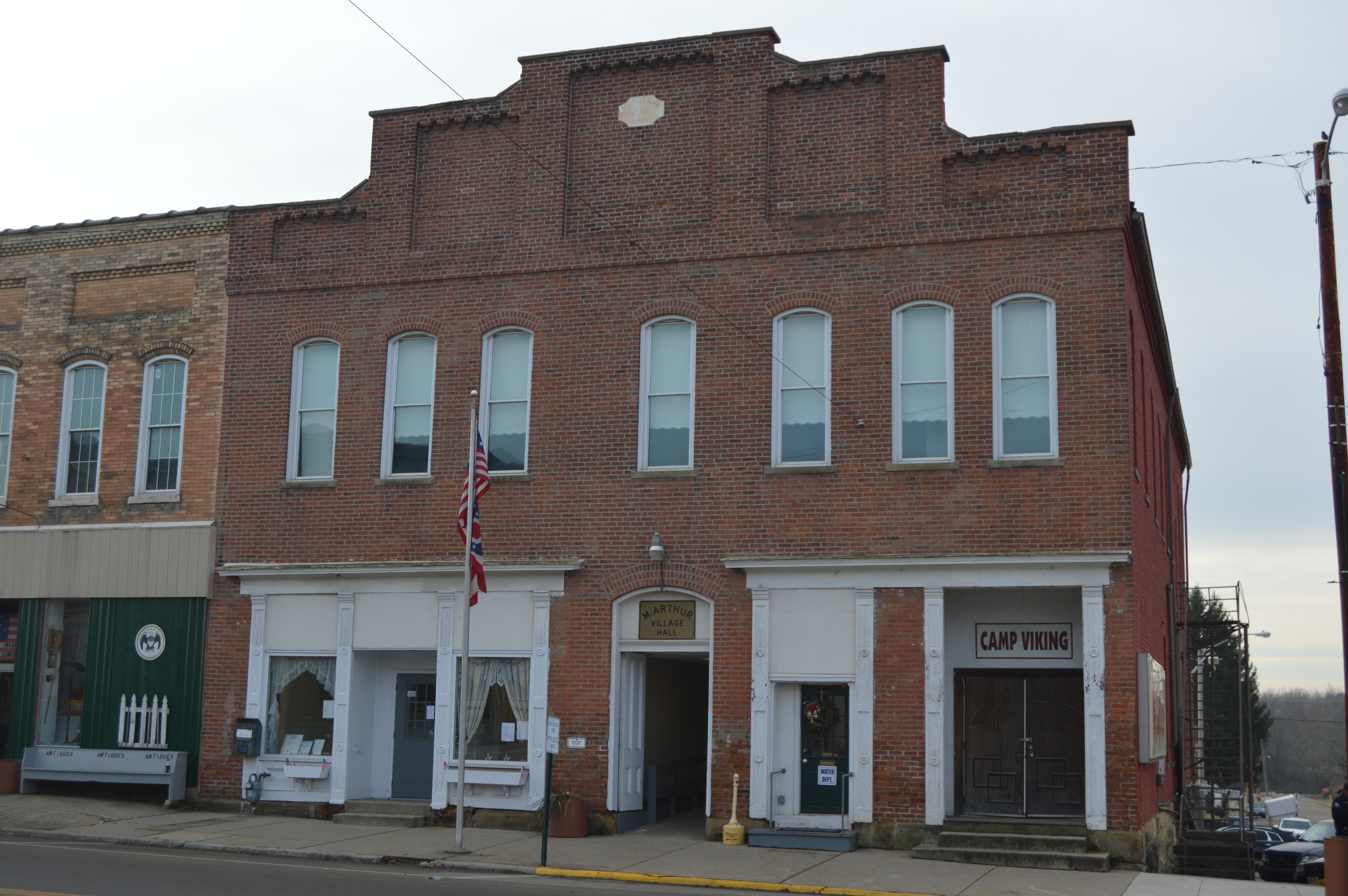
McArthur Village Hall

Historical population
| Census | Pop. | Note | %± |
|---|---|---|---|
| 1850 | 424 | | — |
| 1860 | 822 | | 93.9% |
| 1870 | 861 | | 4.7% |
| 1880 | 900 | | 4.5% |
| 1890 | 888 | | −1.3% |
| 1900 | 941 | | 6.0% |
| 1910 | 1,107 | | 17.6% |
| 1920 | 1,307 | | 18.1% |
| 1930 | 1,188 | | −9.1% |
| 1940 | 1,280 | | 7.7% |
| 1950 | 1,466 | | 14.5% |
| 1960 | 1,529 | | 4.3% |
| 1970 | 1,543 | | 0.9% |
| 1980 | 1,912 | | 23.9% |
| 1990 | 1,541 | | −19.4% |
| 2000 | 1,888 | | 22.5% |
| 2010 | 1,701 | | −9.9% |
| 2020 | 1,783 | | 4.8% |
U.S. Decennial Census

=== 2010 census ===
As of the census of 2010, there were 1,701 people, 700 households, and 451 families living in the village. The population density was 1,278.9 inhabitants per square mile (493.8/km^{2}). There were 771 housing units at an average density of 579.7 per square mile (223.8/km^{2}). The racial makeup of the village was 98.1% White, 0.1% African American, 0.8% Native American, 0.3% from other races, and 0.8% from two or more races. Hispanic or Latino of any race were 0.8% of the population.

There were 700 households, of which 34.7% had children under the age of 18 living with them, 38.4% were married couples living together, 19.6% had a female householder with no husband present, 6.4% had a male householder with no wife present, and 35.6% were non-families. 31.9% of all households were made up of individuals, and 14.5% had someone living alone who was 65 years of age or older. The average household size was 2.43 and the average family size was 2.97.

The median age in the village was 35.3 years. 27.5% of residents were under the age of 18; 10.2% were between the ages of 18 and 24; 23.6% were from 25 to 44; 23.3% were from 45 to 64; and 15.3% were 65 years of age or older. The gender makeup of the village was 45.7% male and 54.3% female.

=== 2000 census ===
As of the census of 2000, there were 1,888 people, 777 households, and 512 families living in the village. The population density was 1,416.2 inhabitants per square mile (546.8/km^{2}). There were 845 housing units at an average density of 633.8 per square mile (244.7/km^{2}). The racial makeup of the village was 98.15% White, 0.11% African American, 0.26% Native American, and 1.48% from two or more races. Hispanic or Latino of any race were 0.42% of the population.

There were 777 households, out of which 35.1% had children under the age of 18 living with them, 45.0% were married couples living together, 15.4% had a female householder with no husband present, and 34.1% were non-families. 31.8% of all households were made up of individuals, and 15.7% had someone living alone who was 65 years of age or older. The average household size was 2.42 and the average family size was 3.04.

In the village, the population was spread out, with 30.1% under the age of 18, 9.2% from 18 to 24, 26.4% from 25 to 44, 19.6% from 45 to 64, and 14.7% who were 65 years of age or older. The median age was 33 years. For every 100 females there were 83.3 males. For every 100 females age 18 and over, there were 75.4 males.

The median income for a household in the village was $25,393, and the median income for a family was $33,026. Males had a median income of $30,109 versus $21,354 for females. The per capita income for the village was $14,623. About 24.7% of families and 27.8% of the population were below the poverty line, including 39.9% of those under age 18 and 14.8% of those age 65 or over.

== Education ==
McArthur is served by Central Elementary School, Vinton County Middle School, and Vinton County High School, all of which are part of Vinton County Local School District

McArthur has a public library, the Herbert Wescoat Memorial Library.

== Infrastructure ==
=== Transportation ===
The Vinton County Airport is located five nautical miles (5.8 mi; 9.3 km) north-northeast of McArthur's central business district.

== Notable people ==
- Pete Abele – politician and judge
- Dick Bates – Major League Baseball pitcher
- Benson Dillon Billinghurst – superintendent and educator
- Edward Franklin Bingham – Vinton County prosecuting attorney and judge
- Horatio C. Claypool – U.S. Representative
- Maude Collins – First female elected sheriff in the state of Ohio
- Thomas S. Crow – Master Chief Petty Officer of the Navy
- Thomas Wren – U.S. Representative from Nevada
