= List of former state routes in Ohio (675–824) =

This is a list of former state routes in Ohio since 1923 with route numbers from 675 through 824 inclusive.

== SR 675 ==
State Route 675
- Location: Athens County
- Existed: 1937–1962

SR 675 was the name for what is now SR 685. Created in 1937, the route always started at SR 216 in Buchtel and ran east for five miles (8.0 km) to SR 13 in Trimble Township, south of Jacksonville. The entire route was located in Athens County. The route would remain unchanged until 1962 when the route number was changed from 675 to 685 due to the creation of Interstate 675 in Dayton.

Browse numbered routes
← I-675	OH	→ SR 676

== SR 680 ==
State Route 680
- Location: Mineral–Reedsville
- Existed: 1937–1962

SR 680 was the former designation for SR 681 from 1937 until 1962. SR 680 was created on a road from SR 356 near Mineral to SR 7 at the Ohio River in Reedsville via Albany and Darwin. No changes occurred to the routing until 1962 when it was renumbered to SR 681 to avoid the duplication with the newly designated Interstate 680 near Youngstown.

Browse numbered routes
← I-680	OH	→ SR 681

== SR 686 ==
State Route 686
- Location: Lawrence Township–Massillon
- Existed: 1937–1941

SR 686 was a state route in Stark County connecting SR 93 in Lawrence Township to US 21 in northern Massillon. The route existed from 1937 until 1941 when it was replaced by Stark County Road 348, also called Orrville Street NW.

Browse numbered routes
← SR 685	OH	→ SR 687

== SR 692 ==
State Route 692
- Location: Scipio Township
- Length: 3.19 mi (5.13 km)
- Existed: 1937–2013

SR 692 was a state route in Scipio Township connecting SR 143 between Walsh and Harrisonville to SR 680 (later SR 681) north of Pageville. The route also intersected SR 684 at SR 684's northern terminus in Pageville. The route existed from 1937 until December 2013 when most of the route was transferred to Meigs County jurisdiction. North of SR 684, the road became a part of SR 684.

== SR 695 ==
State Route 695
- Location: Lloydsville
- Existed: 1939–1939

SR 695 was a short-lived state route serving as the main road through the Belmont County community of Lloydsville. Prior to 1939, US 40 ran through the town, but in 1939 a bypass was built north of the community. SR 695 was designated onto the old main road when US 40 was moved to the bypass. Within one year, SR 695 was replaced by US 40 Alternate, a designation that would last until the 1960s.

Browse numbered routes
← SR 694	OH	→ SR 696

== SR 699 ==
State Route 699
- Location: Kirby
- Length: 2.02 mi (3.25 km)
- Existed: 1937–1996

SR 699 was a state highway entirely in Wyandot County in existence from 1937 until 1996. From 1937 until 1964, SR 699 started in Marseilles Township at SR 37 and ran due north past SR 294, SR 53, and the village of Kirby to end at US 30N. After 1965, SR 699 was shortened to run only between SR 53 and US 30N (later US 30) serving Kirby. The route was deleted in 1996 when it was replaced by SR 293 which had formerly been a spur route from US 30 to the village of Wharton.

Browse numbered routes
← SR 698	OH	→ SR 700

== SR 702 (1940–1977) ==
State Route 702
- Location: Stokes Township
- Existed: 1940–1977

SR 702 was a short state highway spur from SR 235 to Turkeyfoot Point on the Indian Lake shoreline entirely in Stokes Township, Logan County. The route was designated in 1940 and remained on this alignment until 1977. Today, the former state route is a township-maintained road (T-293).

Browse numbered routes
← SR 702	OH	→ SR 703

== SR 704 ==
State Route 704
- Location: Willshire–Lima
- Existed: 1937–1939

SR 704 was the designation for what is now SR 81 between Willshire and Lima from 1937 until 1939. The route was replaced by SR 81 which formerly ended in Ada when it was extended through Lima.

Browse numbered routes
← SR 703	OH	→ SR 705

== SR 714 ==
State Route 714
- Location: Union Township–Salem Township
- Length: 3.07 mi (4.94 km)
- Existed: 1937–1982

SR 714 was the designation for SR 814 prior to 1983. First designated in 1937, SR 714 always ran from US 36 in Union Township to SR 290 (later SR 296) in Salem Township. The route was entirely in Champaign County. After 1983, the route designation was renumbered to SR 814.

== SR 723 (1939–1945) ==
State Route 723
- Location: Harveysburg–New Burlington
- Existed: 1939–1945

SR 723 was a five-mile-long (8.0 km) state highway in Warren and Clinton Counties in central Ohio. The route started in Harveysburg at SR 73 and ran north to SR 380 near New Burlington. The entire route generally followed the Caesar Creek between its two ends. The route existed from 1939 until 1945 when it became a local road. Today, part of the road is under water as the Caesar Creek Lake was filled in the 1970s as a part of the creation of Caesar Creek State Park.

== SR 751 (1937–1959) ==
State Route 751
- Location: Madison Township–Columbus
- Existed: 1937–1959

SR 751 was a state highway in and around the eastern side of Columbus. When it was first designated in 1937, the route was about one-and-a-half-mile-long (2.4 km) and ran from US 40 to SR 16, paralleling the Big Walnut Creek for its entire length. Two years later, SR 751 was extended south to US 33 southeast of the city bringing the total length to 6.5 miles (10.5 km). Again, the entire route closely followed Big Walnut Creek. The route was deleted after 1959 being replaced by mostly local roads as by the time of its deletion, most of the land through which SR 751 passed through had been incorporated.

== SR 773 ==
State Route 773
- Location: Rochester Township–Akron
- Existed: 1937–1937

SR 773 was the designation for what is now SR 162 between Rochester and Akron in 1937. After one year signed, the entire route was replaced by SR 162, which during the time of SR 773's existence, had its eastern terminus in New London. SR 162 was routed over a new road between New London and Rochester to connect to SR 773 and continue to Akron.

Browse numbered routes
← SR 772	OH	→ SR 774

== SR 780 ==
State Route 780
- Location: Salem Township–Hamer Township
- Existed: 1937–1946

SR 780 was a state route in Highland County. The route began at SR 134 in the Salem Township community of Harwood and ran five miles (8.0 km) northeast and east to SR 138 in the Hamer Township community of Danville. SR 780 was designated in 1937 and fully paved by 1941. After 1946, SR 131 was extended from its former end in Vera Cruz taking over the entire length of SR 780.

Browse numbered routes
← SR 778	OH	→ SR 781

== SR 782 ==
State Route 782
- Location: Columbus
- Existed: 1949–1957

SR 782 was a state-maintained section of Sandusky Street in Downtown Columbus. The route started at West Broad Street (which carried US 40, US 62, and SR 3) and traveled north to US 33 (Dublin Road). When the route was created around 1949, the northern terminus was at an intersection with US 33, but by 1955 the northern terminus was reconstructed to an interchange. The route was still in existence in 1957, but later the right-of-way of Sandusky Street was obliterated by the construction of the West Innerbelt (first a section of Interstate 71, now a part of SR 315).

Browse numbered routes
← SR 781	OH	→ SR 785

External links

- The Spring-Sandusky Interchange

== SR 791 ==
State Route 791
- Location: Canton
- Existed: 1946–1980s

SR 791 was a state route in and around Canton along Raff Road between an intersection with Navarre Road (US 62) and Canton-Massillon Road in Canton Township to Tuscarawas Street (US 30) in Canton. The route was created in 1946. Following the completion of the US 30 / US 62 freeway through Canton, the route at SR 791's northern terminus became SR 172 but the route's southern terminus remained at what used to be the Navarre Road intersection. 1976 was the last year SR 791 appeared on the official Ohio highway map, but the route remained in the Stark County traffic logs through 1988.

Browse numbered routes
← SR 790	OH	→ SR 792

== SR 793 (1937) ==
State Route 793
- Location: Marble Cliff–Columbus
- Existed: 1937–1937

SR 793 was a state route located in northwestern Columbus for one year, 1937. Until 1937, the route that SR 793 would follow was signed as SR 31. In 1937, SR 31 switched the route it used to enter Columbus; SR 31 headed south to US 40 while SR 793 was routed from Marble Cliff to northwestern Columbus at US 23. Within one year, SR 31 was back on its original alignment, this time co-signed with the newly signed US 33.

== SR 793 (1959–2006) ==
State Route 793
- Location: Hocking Township–Lancaster
- Length: 4.80 mi (7.72 km)
- Existed: 1959–2006

SR 793 was a spur to the Southeastern Ohio Training Center (also called the Boys' Industrial School and the Fairfield School for Boys) in Hocking Township, Fairfield County to the city of Lancaster. The route started at the entrance to the training center and traveled north for 4.8 miles (7.7 km) to an interchange at South Memorial Drive, which carried US 33 during the time of SR 793's existence. SR 793 was designated in 1959 and had its jurisdiction transferred to Fairfield County and Lancaster City on May 23, 2006. The section of the route within the city is now only called South Broad Street while the former route outside of it is called Fairfield County Road 90.

== SR 794 (1937–1942) ==
State Route 794
- Location: Washingtonville–Marquis
- Existed: 1937–1942

SR 794 was the designation for a state-maintained section of Washingtonville Road and short portion of Western Reserve Road in southern Mahoning County. The route started in Washingtonville at SR 14 (which straddled the Mahoning–Columbiana County line) and traveled north through Green Township before reaching a T-intersection with Western Reserve Road on the Green-Canfield Township. SR 794 then traveled east to end at a nearby intersection with SR 46 in the community of Marquis. The route was created in 1937 as a dirt road and was paved within one year. SR 794 was decommissioned between 1942 and 1945 and replaced by Mahoning County Road 95 (the north–south portion) and CR 32 (the Western Reserve Road portion).

== SR 794 (1950–2013) ==
State Route 794
- Location: Green Township
- Length: 2.51 mi (4.04 km)
- Existed: 1950–2013

SR 794 was a two-and-a-half-mile-long (4.0 km) route in Green Township, Clark County serving the Springfield-Beckley Municipal Airport and the Springfield Air National Guard Base. The route, created in 1950, connected US 68 and SR 72 south of Springfield. It remained in existence until 2013 when the route and a new alignment built around the National Guard Base was transferred to Clark County jurisdiction.

== SR 796 ==
State Route 796
- Location: Rockbridge
- Existed: 1938–1964

SR 796 was the designation for a former segment of SR 31 through the Good Hope Township community of Rockbridge. In 1938, SR 31 was replaced by US 33 southeast of Columbus; as a part of this renumbering, a bypass of Rockbridge was built. SR 796 was assigned on the two-mile-long (3.2 km) former two-lane road through the area. The route would remain along this alignment until 1964 when it was removed in conjunction with the construction of the US 33 expressway through the county. All of the former route along Rockbridge Road A, Main Street, and Jackson Street is now known as Hocking County Road 10.

Browse numbered routes
← SR 795	OH	→ SR 797

== SR 797 (1939–1941) ==
State Route 797
- Location: Franklin Township–Mantua Township
- Existed: 1939–1941

SR 797 was a state route in Portage County connecting SR 43 in Franklin Township (just north of Kent to SR 82 in the Mantua Center section of Mantua Township. Throughout its history from 1939 until 1941, the portion of the route between SR 43 and SR 14 was asphalt-paved, the section between SR 14 and SR 303 including its concurrency with it was gravel-paved, between SR 303 and halfway to Mantua Center was a dirt road, and the remainder was gravel. Today, most of the former route is called Diagonal Road and Portage County Road 155, though the latter is not designated through the portion that is now part of incorporated Streetsboro.

== SR 797 (1946–2014) ==
State Route 797
- Location: Perry Township
- Length: 1.19 mi (1.92 km)
- Existed: 1946–2014

SR 797 was a route in Perry Township, Muskingum County that served the Zanesville Municipal Airport about six miles (9.7 km) east of the city of Zanesville. It was initially created in 1946 running from the airport's entrance to an intersection with US 22 and US 40. In 1965, with the completion of Interstate 70 in the area, SR 797 was extended north about zero point two miles (0.32 km). The total length of the route was 1.19 miles (1.92 km) from the time of the extension until 2003. That year, the portion south of US 22/US 40 was transferred to county jurisdiction with the short remainder of the route between US 22/US 40 and I-70 becoming county-maintained by 2014.

== SR 798 ==
State Route 798
- Location: Colerain Township–Martins Ferry
- Length: 5.29 mi (8.51 km)
- Existed: 1939–1978

SR 798 was a state route in Belmont County connecting SR 647 and the northern city limits of Martins Ferry at SR 7. The route ran through mostly hilly terrain between its two termini. The route was first signed in 1939 and last appeared on the Ohio state highway map in 1978 but the route did appear in the 1980 Belmont County traffic report. Today the former SR 798 is a part of Deep Run Road (Belmont County Road 2) and Nixon Run Road (CR 16).

Browse numbered routes
← SR 797	OH	→ SR 799

== SR 824 ==
State Route 824
- Location: Lebanon Township
- Length: 0.57 mi (920 m)
- Existed: 1981–2003

SR 824 was the designation for the 0.57-mile-long (0.92 km) road connecting SR 338 and the West Virginia state line near Ravenswood in Lebanon Township, Meigs County. The route included the Ohio portion of the Ravenswood Bridge over the Ohio River. The route was signed in 1981 upon the opening of the bridge and was in existence until 2003 when the bridge became a part of the rerouted US 33 through Meigs County.
