= Ohio State Route 692 =

State highway in Meigs County, Ohio, US

State Route 692

- Map of SR 692 from 1937 to 2013

Route information
- Maintained by ODOT
- Length: 3.19 mi (5.13 km)
- Existed: 1937–December 2, 2013

Major junctions
- South end: SR 143 near Harrisonville
- North end: SR 681 near Pageville

Location
- Country: United States
- State: Ohio
- Counties: Meigs

Highway system
- Ohio State Highway System; Interstate; US; State; Scenic
| ← SR 691 | → SR 694 |

State Route 692 (SR 692) was a short north–south state route in southern Ohio that was located entirely within Meigs County. The southern terminus of SR 692 was at SR 143 approximately three miles (4.8 km) northwest of the hamlet of Harrisonville. Its northern terminus was at SR 681 near the hamlet of Pageville. In 2013, the Ohio Department of Transportation (ODOT) removed SR 692 from the state highway system by making the route north of Pageville an extension of SR 684 and the remainder being transferred to Meigs County's jurisdiction.

== Route description ==
SR 692, which existed entirely within Meigs County's Scipio Township, commenced at a T-intersection with SR 143 northwest of the unincorporated community of Harrisonville. This two-lane route started out heading east-northeasterly through a heavily forested area, working its way up to a connection with each of Gibson Road and Townsend Road, where SR 692 turned due east. Winding its way through the woods, while passing by the occasional field, SR 692 curved to the northeast, then bended back to the east as it headed into the intersection that marked the northern terminus of SR 684. SR 692 turned to the left, taking on a northerly path that took it through the hamlet of Pageville. A few homes and side streets dotted the landscape of Pageville, along with the intersection of SR 692 and Pageville Road. North of that intersection, SR 692 departed the hamlet, and winded its way through more woods. SR 692 then entered into a more open area as it arrived at its junction with SR 681, which marked its terminus.

== History ==
SR 692 was first designated in 1937, along the route that it always occupied. In the 1960s, the route was improved by the then Ohio Department of Highways to help facilitate traffic to and from the nearby Meigs Mines coal operations. The routing never changed from its original 1937 route but as the mining operations ceased, heavy truck diminished negating the need for state maintenance. Following the replacement of a bridge by ODOT and a two-week public comment period in October 2013, SR 692 south of SR 684 was removed from the state highway system with its maintenance jurisdiction transferred to the Meigs County Highway Department. The remainder of the route became a 0.94-mile-long (1.51 km) extension of SR 684. These changes took effect on December 2, 2013. The old highway southwest of SR 684 is now designated as Meigs County Route 692.

== Major intersections ==
The junction list reflects the route at the time of its removal

The entire route was in Scipio Township, Meigs County.

| mi | km | Destinations | Notes |
|---|---|---|---|
| 0.00 | 0.00 | SR 143 – Carpenter, Harrisonville | |
| 2.25 | 3.62 | SR 684 south – Harrisonville | Northern terminus of SR 684 |
| 3.19 | 5.13 | SR 681 – Albany, Darwin | |
1.000 mi = 1.609 km; 1.000 km = 0.621 mi
