= Ohio State Route 680 =

State Route 680

Route information
- Maintained by ODOT

Location
- Country: United States
- State: Ohio

Highway system
- Ohio State Highway System; Interstate; US; State; Scenic
← I-680	→ SR 681

In Ohio, State Route 680 may refer to:

- Interstate 680 in Ohio, the only Ohio highway numbered 680 since about 1962
- Ohio State Route 680 (1930s-1960s), now SR 681
