= Ohio State Route 684 =

State highway in Meigs County, Ohio, US

State Route 684

Route information
- Maintained by ODOT
- Length: 3.91 mi (6.29 km)
- Existed: 1937–present

Major junctions
- South end: SR 143 / CR 3 in Harrisonville
- North end: SR 681 near Pageville

Location
- Country: United States
- State: Ohio
- Counties: Meigs

Highway system
- Ohio State Highway System; Interstate; US; State; Scenic
← SR 683	→ SR 685

State Route 684 (SR 684) is a short north–south state highway in the southern portion of Ohio. Its southern terminus is at State Route 143 in the unincorporated community of Harrisonville, and its northern terminus is at State Route 681 near the community of Pageville.

Created in the late 1930s, State Route 684 is entirely contained within Scipio Township in Meigs County. The two-lane highway, in conjunction with the former State Route 692, provides a cutoff route for traffic running between Pomeroy and Albany via State Route 143 and State Route 681.

== Route description ==
Located exclusively in the northern portion of Meigs County, State Route 684 is a highway that is not included within the National Highway System.

State Route 684 begins in Meigs County's Scipio Township at the intersection of State Route 143 and New Lima Road. The highway runs north-northeasterly from this intersection, passing a number of residences as it heads through the hamlet of Harrisonville. State Route 684 departs Harrisonville and enters into a more rural setting that features a blend of woods, meadows and houses abutting the highway. The route bends to the north and then northwest, as it passes through its intersection with Vance Road. Continuing to the northwest, State Route 684 traverses a more heavily wooded area, and curves to the north prior to meeting King Ridge Road. For the remainder of its trek, patches of open space appears amidst the vast groupings of trees alongside the state highway. The route winds its way to the northwest and then north before bending back to the northeast. State Route 684 next curved to the north, passed Wells Cemetery, and then bends sharply to the west. The highway approaches the hamlet of Pageville at this point, passing a couple of homes as it bends to the north into the T-intersection that marks its former endpoint at what was once SR 692. SR 684 continues north through Pageville before ending at SR 681 just north of the community.

== History ==
State Route 684 was first designated in 1937 along the routing between SR 143 and SR 692 that it maintained from its first designation through late 2013. In the 1960s, the route was improved to help facilitate traffic anticipated due to the Meigs Mine coal operations.

Following the closure of Meigs Mines, reduced traffic on the road negated the need for state maintenance of the road. In October 2013, the Ohio Department of Transportation (ODOT) proposed the removal of SR 684 and SR 692 from the state highway system with jurisdiction of the two roads being transferred to Meigs County. In preparation of the decommissioning, a resurfacing of the entire road by ODOT was completed in 2013 and a two-week public comment period occurred in late October 2013. Due to comments received from the public, ODOT decided to keep SR 684 and extended the route by 0.94 miles (1.51 km) from SR 692 to SR 681 north of Pageville on December 2, 2013. The remainder of SR 692 was removed from the state system with its jurisdiction being transferred to the county.

== Major intersections ==
The entire route is in Scipio Township, Meigs County.

mi	km	Destinations	Notes
0.00	0.00	SR 143 / CR 3 (New Lima Road) – Carpenter	
2.97	4.78	CR 692	
3.91	6.29	SR 681 – Albany, Darwin	
1.000 mi = 1.609 km; 1.000 km = 0.621 mi
