= Ohio State Route 293 =

State highway in Wyandot County, Ohio, US

State Route 293

Route information
- Maintained by ODOT
- Length: 6.277 mi (10.102 km)
- Existed: 1932–present
- Tourist routes: Lincoln Highway

Major junctions
- South end: SR 53 near Kirby
- North end: Cass Street in Wharton

Location
- Country: United States
- State: Ohio
- Counties: Wyandot

Highway system
- Ohio State Highway System; Interstate; US; State; Scenic
| ← SR 292 | → SR 294 |

State Route 293 (SR 293) is a 6.277-mile-long (10.102 km) north–south state highway in the northwestern portion of the U.S. state of Ohio. The southern terminus of SR 293 is at SR 53 nearly one-half mile (0.80 km) south of the village limits of Kirby. Its northern terminus is at the intersection of Sandusky Street and Cass Street in Wharton. The route was designated in 1932, and was extended south in 1997.

== Route description ==
Traffic volume on State Route 293
| County Log Point | Volume |
|---|---|
| 0.609 | 680 |
| 2.479 | 520 |
| 4.559 | 200 |
| 6.186 | 470 |
Volume: AADT; Source:

All of SR 293 exists within the western part of Wyandot County. SR 293 starts at the intersection of SR 53, and becomes concurrent with County Highway 95 (CH 95). There it travels into the village of Kirby, and crosses over a CSX railroad line, as it continues moving north. SR 293 then leaves Kirby and overpasses U.S. Route 30 (US 30). Less than a mile later, SR 293 turns west and becomes concurrent with Lincoln Highway (CH 330), as CH 95 continues to head north. After a bit more than one mile (1.6 km), SR 293 leaves Lincoln Highway and turns north toward Wharton. SR 293 then crosses a bridge over Potato Run, followed by a turn west to downtown Wharton. The route ends at Cass Street, and the road continues as Sandusky Street. Nearly all of the route is in farmland.

== History ==
SR 293 was established in 1932. The highway originally existed along its northernmost present stretch, connecting the village of Wharton with Lincoln Highway, which at one time was a part of US 30, and prior to that US 30N. In 1997, SR 293 was extended to its present southern terminus by following Lincoln Highway (then a part of US 30) east for two miles (3.2 km). From that point, it replaced what was previously designated as SR 699 south to SR 53 just south of Kirby. About ten years later, US 30 was moved to a new alignment south of the Lincoln Highway, no longer having direct access to SR 293.

== Major intersections ==
The entire route is in Wyandot County.

| Location | mi | km | Destinations | Notes |
|---|---|---|---|---|
| Jackson Township | 0.000 | 0.000 | SR 53 | Southern terminus |
| Richland Township | 2.012 | 3.238 | Lincoln Highway (CR 330) | Southern end of Lincoln Highway concurrency |
| Richland Township | 4.027 | 6.481 | Lincoln Highway (CR 330) | Northern end of Lincoln Highway concurrency |
| Wharton | 6.277 | 10.102 | CR 47 (Cass Street) | Northern terminus |
1.000 mi = 1.609 km; 1.000 km = 0.621 mi: Concurrency terminus
