= Ohio State Route 797 =

State highway in Muskingum County, Ohio, US

State Route 797

- Map of SR 797 from 1965 until 2003

Route information
- Maintained by ODOT
- Length: 1.19 mi (1.92 km)
- Existed: 1946–2013

Major junctions
- South end: US 22 / US 40 near Zanesville
- North end: I-70 / CR 52 near Zanesville

Location
- Country: United States
- State: Ohio
- Counties: Muskingum

Highway system
- Ohio State Highway System; Interstate; US; State; Scenic
← SR 796	→ SR 798

State Route 797 (SR 797) was a very short, unsigned north–south state highway in the eastern portion of the U.S. state of Ohio. At the time of its deletion of the route from the state highway system, SR 797 ran from its southern terminus at the U.S. Route 22/U.S. Route 40 concurrency about 4.75 miles (7.64 km) northeast of Zanesville to its northern terminus less than 0.40 miles (0.64 km) to the northwest at Interstate 70 at its exit 160, a diamond interchange. North of the interchange, the road continues to Sonora on Muskingum County Road 52, Sonora Road.

SR 797 was created in the middle of the 1940s. For most of its history, this two-lane highway was a spur route that served to connect Zanesville Municipal Airport to the state highway system, specifically US 22/US 40, in the eastern half of Muskingum County. The highway was extended slightly to the northwest in the mid-1960s when I-70 was opened in the vicinity. However, in the early 2000s, maintenance of the portion of SR 797 between US 22/US 40 and Zanesville Municipal Airport was transferred from state control to Muskingum County. The remainder of the route was transferred to the county in 2013.

== Route description ==
The short path of SR 797 existed entirely within Perry Township in the eastern half of Muskingum County. This route is not included within the National Highway System, a network of routes deemed most important for the economy, mobility and defense of the country.

The southern portion of the route began at Airport Road just north of the Zanesville Municipal Airport. SR 797 traveled north along Airport Road just north of the intersection with Airpark Drive (Muskingum County Road 797). The road is lined with small homes. The route intersected US 22 and US 40 at a four-way stop intersection with a flashing beacon. The intersection of the routes was amidst a commercial strip that typically appears adjacent to a freeway interchange. The highway traveled a very short distance from this intersection to the northwest before it meets I-70 at its exit 160, a diamond interchange. This point served as SR 797's endpoint. Continuing northwest from this location is Sonora Road (CR 52).

== History ==
SR 797 was established in 1946. At the time, it was a spur route that ran from US 22/US 40 southeastward along Airport Road to Zanesville Municipal Airport. When I-70 was completed around and to the east of Zanesville in 1965, SR 797 was extended a short distance north to end at the Interstate's exit 160. On April 3, 2003, SR 797 southeast of US 22/US 40 was removed from the state highway system, with jurisdiction being transferred to Muskingum County. The roadway became known as Airport Road and CR 796. As of December 2013, the remaining portion of SR 797 was transferred to county jurisdiction. The road between US 22/US 40 and I-70 has been redesignated as an extension of CR 52, Sonora Road.

== Major intersections ==
The entire route was in Perry Township, Muskingum County.

mi	km	Destinations	Notes
0.00	0.00	Airport Road – Zanesville Municipal Airport	Southern terminus 1946–2003
0.92	1.48	US 22 / US 40	Northern terminus 1946–1965, southern terminus 2003–2014
1.01– 1.19	1.63– 1.92	I-70 / CR 52 (Sonora Road) – Columbus, Wheeling, WV, Sonora	Exit 160 (I-70); northern terminus 1965–2014
1.000 mi = 1.609 km; 1.000 km = 0.621 mi
