= Ohio State Route 691 =

State highway in Athens County, Ohio, US

State Route 691

Route information
- Maintained by ODOT
- Length: 10.29 mi (16.56 km)
- Existed: 1938–present

Major junctions
- South end: SR 56 near New Marshfield
- North end: US 33 / SR 78 in Nelsonville

Location
- Country: United States
- State: Ohio
- Counties: Athens

Highway system
- Ohio State Highway System; Interstate; US; State; Scenic
← SR 690	→ SR 692

Ohio State Route 691 (SR 691) is a north–south state route in southern Ohio. The entirety of SR 691 is within Athens County. Its southern terminus is at SR 56 about 1.5 miles (2.4 km) northwest of New Marshfield, and its northern terminus is at an interchange with U.S. Route 33 (US 33) and SR 78 in Nelsonville.

== Route description ==
SR 691 commences at a T-intersection with SR 56 approximately 1.5 miles (2.4 km) northwest of the hamlet of New Marshfield in Athens County's Waterloo Township. For the majority of its journey, this two-lane highway winds its way through the woods, passing by the occasional field and house. SR 691 starts out trending in a northeasterly direction, then turns to the north as it approaches Township Highway 556. Continuing northerly, SR 691 eventually bends to the northeast, and passes through a succession of three intersections in a row: Five Points Road (Athens County Road 3 to the southeast), Dowler Ridge Road (County Road 3 to the northwest) and Campbell Road (to the east). Next, SR 691 bends to the north, then follows an elongated reverse curve that takes the highway east, and then back to the north. SR 691 turns to the northeast, and then curves to the northwest as it intersects Vore Ridge Road (County Road 22). The highway next meets Hamley Run Road, then turns to the northeast. SR 691 follows this northeasterly trend for a period, then turns to the east, intersecting Perry Ridge Road as it briefly straddles the boundary between Waterloo Township and York Township. Upon intersecting Salem Road (County Road 9), SR 691 turns north into York Township.

SR 691 next comes upon an intersection with Poston State Road (County Road 110), then trends to the northwest for a stretch. At the end of this stretch, SR 691 follows another extended reverse curve, bending to the northeast, then resuming a northwesterly trek as it passes by Glen Ebon Road (County Road 4). Further along, SR 691 meets Huddy Road, and thereafter winds its way northward. The highway turns northeasterly, intersects Matheny Road, and curves to the northwest. SR 691 makes its way up to the Kimberly Road (County Road 1) intersection, where it turns north, and begins to see a transition from a heavily forested region to a more commercialized area, as it enters into the Nelsonville proper. SR 691 meets the Hockhocking Adena Bikeway, then passes by the Tri-County Vocational School. Bending more to the northeast, SR 691 comes upon its intersection with Hocking Parkway (County Road 30), which connects to the campus of Hocking College. SR 691 then crosses the Hocking River, and immediately after doing so, meets US 33 Business, the former route of US 33 before October 2013. The two routes form a brief concurrency before both end at an interchange with US 33; this interchange also serves as the new western terminus of SR 78.

== History ==
SR 691 was established in 1938 mostly along the routing that it currently occupies (from SR 56 to an intersection near the present southernmost intersection with US 33 Business). The route remained unchanged until October 1, 2013, when the completion of the Nelsonville Bypass led to the construction of a new bridge over the Hocking River and a small extension north to a new interchange with US 33.

== Major intersections ==
The entire route is in Athens County.

Location	mi	km	Destinations	Notes
Waterloo Township	0.00	0.00	SR 56 – Athens, Laurelville	
Nelsonville	9.83	15.82	US 33 Bus. east	Southern end of US 33 Bus. concurrency
Nelsonville	10.03– 10.29	16.14– 16.56	US 33 / SR 78 east / US 33 Bus. ends	Interchange; western terminus of SR 78; northern end of US 33 Bus. concurrency
1.000 mi = 1.609 km; 1.000 km = 0.621 mi: Concurrency terminus
