= Ohio State Route 355 =

State highway in Preble County, Ohio, US

State Route 355

Route information
- Maintained by ODOT
- Length: 1.37 mi (2.20 km)
- Existed: 1934–late 1990s

Major junctions
- From: SR 122 in Eaton
- To: SR 355 in Eaton

Location
- Country: United States
- State: Ohio
- Counties: Preble

Highway system
- Ohio State Highway System; Interstate; US; State; Scenic
← SR 354	→ SR 356

State Route 355 (SR 355) was a short 1.37-mile-long (2.20 km) state highway in southwestern Ohio. The route served the former Fort St. Clair State Memorial (now Fort St. Clair Park) in Eaton, Preble County. The route began at SR 122 in western Eaton, traveled south along Camden Road for about 0.3 miles (0.48 km) before turning into the memorial, looping through the entire site, and ending at itself just south of the route's start at SR 122. The route was removed from the state highway system shortly after the park's jurisdiction was transferred from the state to the City of Eaton.

== Route description ==
SR 355 began at an unsignalized intersection with SR 122, also known as West Main Street, in the western extents of Eaton. SR 355 headed south on the two-lane Camden Road first past the park exit and then between the park and the Mound Hill Cemetery. The route turned right into the park and wound its way throughout the park, past the museum and parking areas. The route ended at the park exit at Camden Road, just 170 feet (52 m) south of where the route started at SR 122.

== History ==
The route was created in 1932 as an unnumbered spur from SR 122 in Eaton to Fort St. Clair State Memorial. By 1934, Ohio maps showed the spur as SR 355. Official state maps prior to 1969 showed the route as a 0.5-mile-long (0.80 km) route, but maps after 1971 showed it as one-mile-long (1.6 km). The short route would not undergo any major changes throughout its history until the park had its jurisdiction transferred from the state to the city in 1992. The route was still in existence as of 1997 but was removed from state maps in 1999.

== Major junctions ==
The entire route was in Eaton, Preble County.

mi	km	Destinations	Notes
0.00	0.00	SR 122 (West Main Street)	
1.37	2.20	SR 355 (Camden Road)	Route looped back to itself
1.000 mi = 1.609 km; 1.000 km = 0.621 mi
