= Ohio State Route 689 =

State highway in southern Ohio, US

State Route 689

Route information
- Maintained by ODOT
- Length: 7.52 mi (12.10 km)
- Existed: 1937–present

Major junctions
- South end: SR 160 near Wilkesville
- North end: SR 32 near Albany

Location
- Country: United States
- State: Ohio
- Counties: Vinton, Meigs

Highway system
- Ohio State Highway System; Interstate; US; State; Scenic
| ← SR 687 | → SR 690 |

State Route 689 (SR 689) is a north–south state highway in the southern portion of the U.S. state of Ohio. Its southern terminus is at SR 160 a mile north of Wilkesville, and its northern terminus is at SR 32 about 6 miles (9.7 km) southwest of Albany.

== Route description ==
SR 689 passes through two counties along its path, Vinton and Meigs. This state highway is not included within the National Highway System.

== History ==
SR 689 first appeared in 1937 along the routing that it currently occupies. Originally, its northern terminus was at a two-lane SR 346, the predecessor to SR 32. In the early 1970s, the construction of the Appalachian Highway (originally numbered SR 346 at its completion, later renumbered to SR 32) truncated the highway very slightly at its northern terminus. No other major changes have occurred to the routing since then.

== Major intersections ==
| County | Location | mi | km | Destinations | Notes |
|---|---|---|---|---|---|
| Vinton | Wilkesville Township | 0.00 | 0.00 | SR 160 – Hamden, Wilkesville | |
| Meigs | Columbia Township | 7.52 | 12.10 | SR 32 (James A. Rhodes Appalachian Highway) – Wellston, Athens | |
1.000 mi = 1.609 km; 1.000 km = 0.621 mi
