= Ohio State Route 682 =

State highway in Athens County, Ohio, US

State Route 682

Route information
- Maintained by ODOT
- Length: 7.75 mi (12.47 km)
- Existed: 1937–present

Major junctions
- South end: US 33 / US 50 / SR 32 in Athens
- US 33 near Chauncey
- North end: SR 13 in Chauncey

Location
- Country: United States
- State: Ohio
- Counties: Athens

Highway system
- Ohio State Highway System; Interstate; US; State; Scenic
← SR 681	→ SR 683

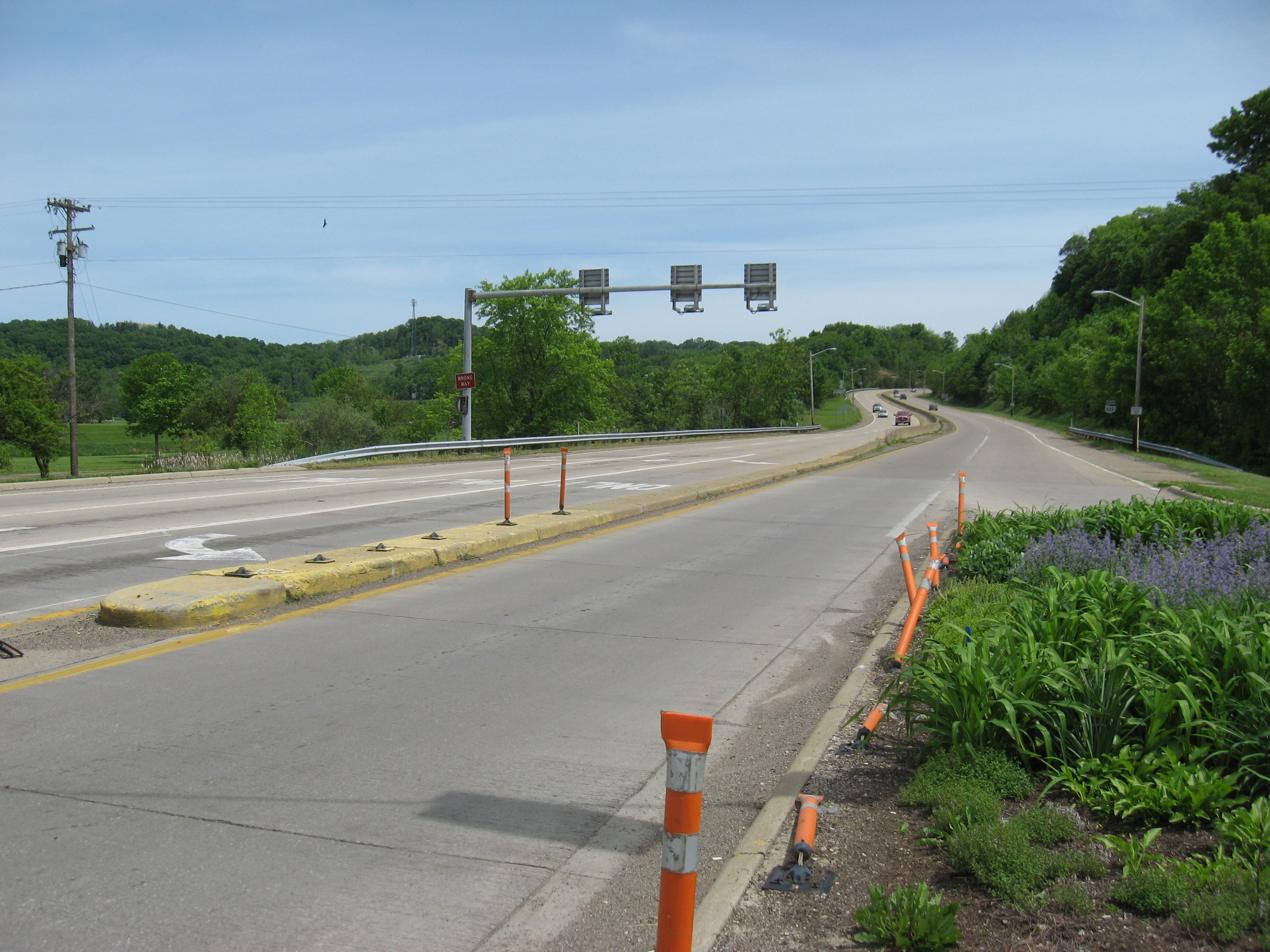
State Route 682 near Athens

State Route 682 (SR 682) is a north–south state highway in the southeastern portion of the U.S. state of Ohio. The southern terminus of State Route 682 is at a trumpet interchange with US 33, US 50 and SR 32 in Athens. Its northern terminus is at SR 13 in the village of Chauncey, Ohio.

SR 682, which was designated in the late 1930s, exists entirely within Athens County, and serves as a southern bypass for the city of Athens. It passes near the main campus of Ohio University.

== Route description ==
The entirety of SR 682 is located in the central part of Athens County. It is not a component of the National Highway System, a system of highways deemed most important for the economy, mobility and defence of the nation.

== History ==
When it was established in 1937, SR 682 ran from the SR 56 junction just southwest of Athens to the point where SR 682 currently meets the connector road to US 33 just southwest of Chauncey] and northwest of where SR 682 crosses over the Hocking River. At the time, this was where SR 682 met the predecessor to what would later become the first routing of US 33 through this area, known at the time as SR 31. By 1961, a new stretch of expressway opened to the south of Chauncey. A re-routing of US 33 out of Chauncey and onto this new expressway resulted in an extension of SR 682 northeasterly into the village along the former two-lane routing of US 33 up to the state highway's current northern terminus at the SR 13 junction (the remainder of the old 33 became an extension for SR 13). By 1969, SR 682 was extended southeasterly through Athens to its current southern terminus at US 33, US 50, and SR 32.

== Major intersections ==
The entire route is in Athens County.

Location	mi	km	Destinations	Notes
Athens Township	0.00	0.00	US 33 / US 50 / SR 32 – Columbus, Belpre, Pomeroy, Chillicothe	Exit 17 (US 33)
Athens Township	2.07	3.33	SR 56 west (West Union Street)	Eastern terminus of SR 56
Dover Township	6.11	9.83	US 33 – Logan, Athens	Interchange
Chauncey	7.75	12.47	SR 13 (Main Street / Converse Street)	
1.000 mi = 1.609 km; 1.000 km = 0.621 mi
