= Ohio State Route 781 =

State highway in Adams County, Ohio, US

State Route 781

Route information
- Maintained by ODOT
- Length: 11.02 mi (17.73 km)
- Existed: 1938–present

Major junctions
- West end: SR 41 near Peebles
- East end: SR 348 near Blue Creek

Location
- Country: United States
- State: Ohio
- Counties: Adams

Highway system
- Ohio State Highway System; Interstate; US; State; Scenic
← SR 780	→ SR 782

State Route 781 (SR 781) is an east–west state highway in southern Ohio, a U.S. state. The western terminus of SR 781 is at SR 41 about 2 1/2 miles (4.0 km) southwest of Peebles in the unincorporated community of Jacksonville. Its eastern terminus is eleven miles (18 km) to the southeast at a T-intersection with SR 348, which is approximately five miles (8.0 km) northeast of the community of Wamsley.

Created in the late 1930s and existing entirely within Adams County, SR 781 passes through rough terrain and by Peach Mountain, which rises over 1,200 feet (370 m).

== Route description ==
All of SR 781 is located within the eastern portion of Adams County. The highway is not inclusive within the National Highway System.

== History ==
SR 781 was first designated in 1938 along the routing between SR 41 and SR 348 that it occupies to this day. The route has not experienced any changes of major significance since it first appeared.

== Major intersections ==
The entire route is in Adams County.

Location	mi	km	Destinations	Notes
Meigs Township	0.00	0.00	SR 41	
Jefferson Township	11.02	17.73	SR 348	
1.000 mi = 1.609 km; 1.000 km = 0.621 mi
