= Wellsburg Bridge =

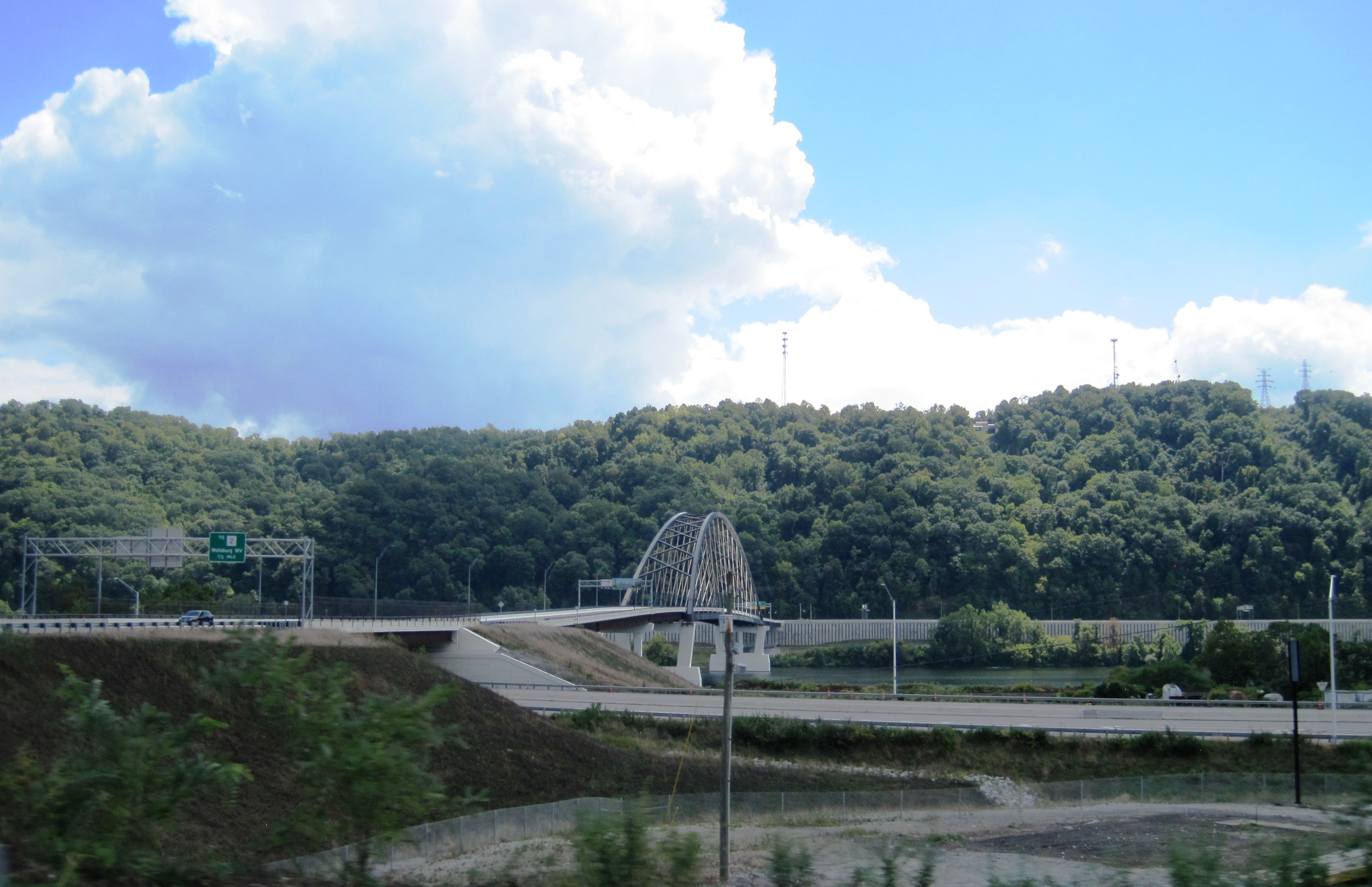
- Photo from Ohio side of river
- Coordinates: 40.2556°N 80.6345°W
- Locale: Brilliant, Ohio, and Wellsburg, West Virginia

Characteristics
- Design: tied-arch bridge

History
- Opened: September 20, 2023

Location
- Interactive map of Wellsburg Bridge

The Wellsburg Bridge is a tied-arch bridge that crosses the Ohio River and connects Brooke County, West Virginia and Jefferson County, Ohio (near the cities of Wellsburg, West Virginia and Brilliant, Ohio). The grand opening celebration was on September 20, 2023, and the bridge opened to motorists the following morning. The project cost $131 million. The bridge is to be renamed when the West Virginia Legislature convenes in January 2024. In preparation for the naming, West Virginia state senator Ryan Weld of Brooke County, West Virginia solicited input from local residents on social media.

In Ohio, the bridge is part of Ohio State Route 702 (SR 702). SR 702 runs as an unsigned highway along 3rd Street between the northbound SR 7 offramp and Cleaver Street in Brilliant, then runs along the bridge itself to the state line for a total distance of 0.636 miles (1.024 km). The route was assigned to part of the bridge at its opening.

Browse numbered routes
← SR 701	OH	→ SR 702
