= List of state routes in Ohio =

Ohio State Routes
- Typical highway markers

- Map of all Ohio highways: Interstate highways; Toll road (Ohio Turnpike); U.S. routes; State routes

System information
- Formed: 1912, renumbered in 1923, 1927, 1962
- State: State Route nn (SR nn)

System links
- Ohio State Highway System; Interstate; US; State; Scenic

State Routes in Ohio are owned by the state, and maintained by the state except in cities (see Numbered highways in Ohio). They are signed with a white silhouette of Ohio against a black background.

== Markers ==
	Marker design in use from the early 1920s to 1926
	Marker design in use from 1927 to 1948
	Marker design in use from 1948 to 1961
	Marker design in use from 1962 to 1966
	Marker design in use from 1967 to 1970
	Marker design used in Ohio since 1971
Date ranges are approximate

== List ==
Number	Length (mi)	Length (km)	Southern or western terminus	Northern or eastern terminus	Formed	Removed
SR 1	227.77	366.56	New Paris	Bridgeport	1912	1926
SR 1	353.15	568.34	I-75 at the Kentucky state line in Cincinnati	I-90 at the Pennsylvania state line in Conneaut	1961	1965
SR 2	227.13	365.53	SR 37 in Hicksville Township	US 20 in Painesville Township	1912	current
SR 3	255.52	411.22	US 27/US 42/US 52/US 127 in Cincinnati	US 6/US 20/US 42/US 322/US 422 in Cleveland	1923	current
SR 4	207.22	333.49	US 42 in Cincinnati	US 6/SR 101 in Sandusky	1912	current
SR 5	—	—	Delphos	Wooster	1923	1931
SR 5	51.24	82.46	I-76/SR 44 in Rootstown Township	PA 58 at Pennsylvania state line in Kinsman Township	1932	current
SR 6	—	—	Cincinnati	Toledo	1923	1926
SR 6	—	—	Bridgeport	Norwalk	1926	1928
SR 6	—	—	Cleveland	Painesville	1929	1931
SR 7	335.98	540.71	US 52 in Union Township	SR 531 in Conneaut	1912	current
SR 8	38.39	61.78	I-76/I-77 in Akron	US 6/US 20/US 42/US 322/US 422 in Cleveland	1923	current
SR 9	—	—	Cincinnati	Pioneer	1923	1930
SR 9	92.51	148.88	SR 148 in Washington Township	US 62 in Salem	1934	current
SR 10	—	—	Delphos	Plain Township	1923	1926
SR 10	—	—	Washington Court House	Zanesville	1926	1931
SR 10	—	—	Aberdeen	Toledo	1932	1932
SR 10	23.64	38.04	US 20/SR 57/SR 301 in Eaton Township	US 422 in Cleveland	1934	current
SR 11	—	—	Gallipolis	New Paris	1923	1935
SR 11	99.60	160.29	US 30 in East Liverpool	SR 531 in Ashtabula	1967	current
SR 12	60.84	97.91	SR 115/SR 189 in Sugar Creek Township	SR 53 in Ballville Township	1923	current
SR 13	—	—	Bridgeport	Cleveland	1923	1926
SR 13	166.15	267.39	SR 550 in Athens Township	US 6 in Huron	1926	current
SR 14	81.53	131.21	US 6/US 20/US 42/US 322/US 422 in Cleveland	PA 51 at Pennsylvania state line in Unity Township	1923	current
SR 15	—	—	Cleveland	Williamsfield	1912	1926
SR 15	102.31	164.65	US 23/SR 103 in Carey	M-99 at Michigan state line in Madison Township	1926	current
SR 16	—	—	Cleveland	Coitsville Township	1923	1926
SR 16	70.46	113.39	US 40/Civic Center Drive in Columbus	US 36 in Jackson Township	1926	current
SR 17	—	—	Harrison Township	Lowellville	1923	1933
SR 17	21.04	33.86	SR 10 in North Olmsted	SR 43 in Bedford Heights	1935	current
SR 18	197.36	317.62	SR 8 at Indiana state line in Hicksville Township	SR 91 in Akron	1923	current
SR 19	—	—	Columbus	Masury	1923	1931
SR 19	86.48	139.18	US 42 in Congress Township	SR 2 in Carroll Township	1932	current
SR 20	—	—	Columbus	East Liverpool	1923	1926
SR 21	—	—	Columbus	Findlay	1923	1926
SR 21	59.77	96.19	US 250 in Franklin Township	I-77 in Cuyahoga Heights	1971	current
SR 22	—	—	Marion	Indiana state line	1923	1926
SR 23	—	—	Columbia	Lacarne	1923	1926
SR 24	—	—	Hillsboro	Pomeroy	1923	1926
SR 25	—	—	Cincinnati	Friendship	1923	1926
SR 25	34.98	56.29	I-75 in Henry Township	I-280 in Toledo	1973	current
SR 26	66.91	107.68	SR 7 in Marietta	SR 148 in Wayne Township	1923	current
SR 27	—	—	Cincinnati	Logan	1923	1926
SR 28	—	—	Cincinnati	West Jefferson	1923	1926
SR 28	69.82	112.36	US 50 in Milford	US 50 in Twin Township	1926	current
SR 29	102.94	165.67	SR 67 at Indiana state line in Washington Township	US 40 in West Jefferson	1923	current
SR 30	—	—	Chauncey	Sandusky	1923	1926
SR 31	—	—	Antwerp	Toledo	1923	1926
SR 31	32.12	51.69	SR 38 in Marysville	US 68 in Kenton	1926	current
SR 32	—	—	Washington Township	Marysville	1923	1937
SR 32	182.71	294.04	US 50/SR 561 in Cincinnati	WV 618 at West Virginia state line in Belpre	1962	current
SR 33	—	—	Lima	Chesterfield Township	1923	1937
SR 34	31.97	51.45	SR 427 at Indiana state line in Florence Township	US 6 in Ridgeville Township	1923	current
SR 35	—	—	Malaga	Salem	1923	1934
SR 36	—	—	Wooster	Kinsman Township	1923	1931
SR 37	174.21	280.36	US 224/SR 12 in Findlay	SR 60/SR 78 in McConnelsville	1923	current
SR 38	48.67	78.33	US 62/SR 3 in Union Township	SR 31 in Marysville	1923	current
SR 39	154.11	248.02	SR 103 in Auburn Township	PA 68 at Pennsylvania state line in East Liverpool	1923	current
SR 40	—	—	Washington Court House	Zanesville	1923	1926
SR 41	155.21	249.79	US 52/US 62 Bus./US 68 Bus. in Aberdeen	US 36/SR 48 in Covington	1923	current
SR 42	—	—	Marion	Liberty Township	1923	1926
SR 43	122.57	197.26	SR 7 in Steubenville	US 6/US 20/US 42/US 322/US 422 in Cleveland	1923	current
SR 44	81.23	130.73	SR 43 in Sandy Township	Headlands Beach State Park in Painesville Township	1923	current
SR 45	96.56	155.40	SR 7/SR 39 in Wellsville	SR 531 in Saybrook Township	1923	current
SR 46	76.66	123.37	SR 170/SR 558 in East Palestine	SR 11 in Plymouth Township	1923	current
SR 47	—	—	Union Township	Findlay	1923	1931
SR 47	105.23	169.35	SR 32 at Indiana state line in Union City	SR 98/SR 423 in Waldo	1933	current
SR 48	—	—	Fly	Dennison	1923	1926
SR 48	83.03	133.62	SR 132 in Goshen Township	SR 66 in Loramie Township	1926	current
SR 49	—	—	Cambridge	Steubenville	1923	1926
SR 49	153.06	246.33	US 35 in Trotwood	M-49 at Michigan state line in Northwest Township	1926	current
SR 50	—	—	Lebanon	Newberry Township	1923	1926
SR 51	—	—	Dayton	Greenville	1923	1934
SR 51	30.73	49.46	US 20 in Washington Township	US 23 /US 223/SR 184 in Sylvania	1955	current
SR 52	—	—	Middletown	Irwin	1923	1926
SR 53	92.75	149.27	US 68/SR 67 in Kenton	Ferry to South Bass Island in Catawba Island Township	1923	current
SR 54	22.97	36.97	SR 41 in Harmony Township	US 36/SR 29 in Urbana	1938	current
SR 55	37.87	60.95	SR 571 in Union Township	US 68 in Urbana	1923	current
SR 56	108.74	175.00	SR 29 in Union Township	SR 682 in Athens	1923	current
SR 57	61.22	98.52	US 30 in East Union Township	US 6 in Lorain	1938	current
SR 58	41.63	67.00	US 250 in Ashland	US 6 in Lorain	1923	current
SR 59	—	—	Bellevue	Elyria	1923	1938
SR 59	22.66	36.47	I-76/I-77 in Akron	SR 5 in Ravenna Township	1969	current
SR 60	189.92	305.65	WV 31 at West Virginia state line in Marietta	US 6 in Vermilion	1923	current
SR 61	91.16	146.71	US 36/SR 3 in Sunbury	US 6 in Berlin Township	1923	current
SR 62	—	—	Galion	Oak Harbor	1923	1931
SR 63	—	—	Carey	Sylvania	1923	1926
SR 63	11.74	18.89	SR 4 in Monroe	US 42/SR 48/SR 123 in Lebanon	1926	current
SR 64	36.47	58.69	I-75/SR 105 in Bowling Green	Loar Highway in Amboy Township	1923	current
SR 65	115.84	186.43	SR 47 in Salem Township	I-280 in Toledo	1923	current
SR 66	118.60	190.87	US 36 in Piqua	US 20 in Fayette	1923	current
SR 67	84.78	136.44	US 33 in Wapakoneta	SR 18/SR 19 in Republic	1923	current
SR 68	—	—	Union City	Waldo	1923	1932
SR 69	—	—	Dayton	Tontogany	1923	1968
SR 70	—	—	Cynthiana	Covington	1923	1962
SR 71	—	—	Union City	Crystal Lakes	1923	1962
SR 72	53.26	85.71	US 62 in Penn Township	SR 334 in Moorefield Township	1923	current
SR 73	134.80	216.94	US 27 in Oxford	US 23/SR 104 in Portsmouth	1923	current
SR 74	—	—	Cincinnati	Franklin Township	1923	1962
SR 75	—	—	Ironton	Stone Creek	1923	1962
SR 76	—	—	Belpre	Avon Lake	1923	1972
SR 77	—	—	Marietta	Shreve	1923	1962
SR 78	104.96	168.92	US 33/SR 691 in Nelsonville	SR 7 in Clarington	1923	current
SR 79	45.65	73.47	SR 37 on Walnut–Union township line	US 36 in Nellie	1923	current
SR 80	—	—	Sandyville	Edinburg	1923	1962
SR 81	—	—	Brentwood Lake	Aurora	1923	1926
SR 81	70.49	113.44	SR 124 at Indiana state line in Willshire Township	SR 53 in Patterson	1926	current
SR 82	88.56	142.52	SR 57 in Carlisle Township	US 62 in Brookfield Township	1923	current
SR 83	—	—	Ashtabula	Monroe Township	1923	1957
SR 83	157.37	253.26	SR 60 in Waterford Township	US 6 in Avon Lake	1972	current
SR 84	63.34	101.94	US 6/US 20 in Euclid	PA 226 at Pennsylvania state line in Monroe Township	1923	current
SR 85	2.66	4.28	US 6/SR 7 in Andover	PA 285 at Pennsylvania state line in Andover Township	1923	current
SR 86	21.98	35.37	US 20 in Painesville	SR 534 in Windsor Township	1923	current
SR 87	60.32	97.08	US 6/US 20/US 42/US 322/US 422 in Cleveland	SR 5/SR 7 in Kinsman Township	1923	current
SR 88	48.24	77.63	SR 59 in Ravenna	PA 358 at Pennsylvania state line in Vernon Township	1923	current
SR 89	—	—	Canton	Aurora	1923	1926
SR 89	18.42	29.64	SR 95 in Mohican Township	SR 58 in Jackson Township	1926	current
SR 90	—	—	Petersburg	North Kingsville	1923	1962
SR 91	44.12	71.00	US 224 in Springfield Township	SR 283 on Timberlake–Eastlake municipal line	1912	current
SR 92	—	—	Ghent	Ghent	1923	1936
SR 93	232.46	374.11	US 52 in Upper Township	SR 261 in Akron	1923	current
SR 94	54.50	87.71	US 250/SR 241 in Mount Eaton	US 42/SR 3 in Cleveland	1923	current
SR 95	—	—	Strasburg	Wooster	1923	1926
SR 95	89.04	143.30	SR 37 in La Rue	SR 3 in Wooster Township	1926	current
SR 96	35.93	57.82	SR 98 in Liberty Township	US 42/US 250 in Ashland	1923	current
SR 97	34.60	55.68	SR 19/SR 61/SR 309 in Galion	SR 3 in Hanover Township	1923	current
SR 98	46.18	74.32	SR 47/SR 423 in Waldo	SR 61 in Plymouth	1923	current
SR 99	22.61	36.39	US 224 in Willard	SR 4 in Groton Township	1923	current
SR 100	38.95	62.68	SR 309 in Tully Township	SR 53 in Tiffin	1923	current
SR 101	34.79	55.99	SR 18/SR 53 in Tiffin	US 6 in Sandusky	1923	current
SR 102	—	—	Elmore	Toledo	1923	1939
SR 102	—	—	Toledo	Michigan	1946	1949
SR 103	77.02	123.95	I-75 in Richland Township	SR 61 in New Haven Township	1923	current
SR 104	95.17	153.16	US 23/SR 73 in Portsmouth	US 33 in Columbus	1923	current
SR 105	28.39	45.69	I-75/SR 64 in Bowling Green	SR 19 /SR 163 in Oak Harbor	1923	current
SR 106	—	—	Gomer	Findlay	1923	1937
SR 107	11.05	17.78	SR 49 in Florence Township	US 20A/SR 15 in Jefferson Township	1923	current
SR 108	—	—	Hicksville Township	Bryan	1923	1936
SR 108	49.21	79.20	SR 15 in Greensburg Township	M-156 at Michigan state line in Chesterfield Township	1938	current
SR 109	—	—	Harrison Township	Ottawa	1923	1926
SR 109	52.96	85.23	US 224/SR 15/SR 65 in Ottawa	M-52 at Michigan state line in Royalton Township	1926	current
SR 110	10.70	17.22	SR 108 in Napoleon	SR 65 in Damascus Township	1923	current
SR 111	31.49	50.68	Woodburn Road/State Line Road in Harrison Township	SR 15/SR 18/SR 66 in Defiance	1923	current
SR 112	—	—	Sylvania	Toledo	1923	1926
SR 112	—	—	Portsmouth	Waverly	1926	1950
SR 112	—	—	Toledo	Toledo	1965	1973
SR 113	59.64	95.98	US 20/SR 18/SR 269 in Bellevue	US 6/US 20/SR 2 in Lakewood	1923	current
SR 114	32.99	53.09	State Line Road in Benton Township	US 224/SR 115 in Kalida	1923	current
SR 115	21.65	34.84	SR 65 in Lima	SR 15 in Palmer Township	1923	current
SR 116	30.81	49.58	SR 29/SR 66/SR 703 in St. Marys	US 127 in Van Wert	1923	current
SR 117	59.57	95.87	SR 118 in Dublin Township	US 33 in McArthur Township	1923	current
SR 118	55.26	88.93	SR 49/SR 121/SR 502/SR 571 in Greenville	US 127 in Van Wert	1923	current
SR 119	41.94	67.50	SR 26 at Indiana state line in Recovery Township	SR 65 in Jackson Township	1923	current
SR 120	—	—	Brock	Piqua	1923	1939
SR 120	37.72	60.70	Morenci Road in Chesterfield Township	SR 65 in Toledo	1940	current
SR 121	35.94	57.84	SR 121 at Indiana state line in Jefferson Township	SR 47/SR 185 in Versailles	1923	current
SR 122	43.26	69.62	Old SR 122 at Indiana state line on Dixon–Jackson township line	SR 48 in Clearcreek Township	1923	current
SR 123	43.61	70.18	SR 251 in Perry Township	SR 4 in German Township	1923	current
SR 124	—	—	Sharonville	Franklin	1923	1926
SR 124	165.51	266.36	SR 134 in Clark Township	US 50/SR 7/SR 32 in Troy Township	1926	current
SR 125	—	—	Monroe	Lebanon	1923	1926
SR 125	85.79	138.07	US 50/SR 561 in Cincinnati	US 52 in Nile Township	1926	current
SR 126	—	—	Hamilton	College Corner	1923	1926
SR 126	41.18	66.27	SR 252 at Indiana state line on Reily–Monroe township line	US 50/SR 28 in Milford	1926	current
SR 127	—	—	Scipio	Hamilton	1923	1926
SR 128	22.53	36.26	US 50 in Cleves	SR 4/SR 129/SR 177 in Hamilton	1923	current
SR 129	—	—	Scipio	Cincinnati	1923	1926
SR 129	25.86	41.62	SR 126 in Morgan Township	I-75 in Liberty Township	1926	current
SR 130	—	—	Harrison	Cheviot	1923	1926
SR 130	4.72	7.60	US 27 in Hanover Township	SR 177 in Hamilton	1926	current
SR 131	29.98	48.25	US 50 in Milford	SR 138 in Hamer Township	1923	current
SR 132	40.52	65.21	US 52 in New Richmond	SR 133/SR 350 in Clarksville	1923	current
SR 133	49.45	79.58	US 52 in Franklin Township	SR 132/SR 350 in Clarksville	1923	current
SR 134	41.21	66.32	SR 32 in Sardinia	Main Street in Port William	1923	current
SR 135	2.82	4.54	US 50 in Dodson Township	SR 134 in Lynchburg	1923	current
SR 136	32.35	52.06	US 52 in Manchester	US 62 in New Market Township	1923	current
SR 137	3.56	5.73	SR 136 in Cherry Fork	SR 247 in Wayne Township	1923	current
SR 138	60.37	97.16	SR 134 in Clay Township	US 22 in Wayne Township	1923	current
SR 139	33.99	54.70	US 52 in New Boston	SR 93 in Jackson	1923	current
SR 140	20.74	33.38	US 52 in Portsmouth	SR 93 in Jefferson Township	1923	current
SR 141	44.97	72.37	US 52 in Ironton	SR 7 in Gallipolis	1923	current
SR 142	—	—	Kerr	Hamden	1923	1926
SR 142	13.66	21.98	US 42/SR 38/SR 56/SR 665 in London	I-70 in Jefferson Township	1926	current
SR 143	20.15	32.43	SR 7 in Salisbury Township	US 50 in Lee Township	1923	current
SR 144	14.61	23.51	SR 124 in Troy Township	SR 329 in Rome Township	1923	current
SR 145	46.14	74.26	SR 821 in Lower Salem	SR 148 in Washington Township	1923	current
SR 146	65.25	105.01	SR 16 in Hanover Township	SR 78 in Summerfield	1923	current
SR 147	58.19	93.65	SR 78 in Center Township	SR 7 in Pultney Township	1923	current
SR 148	26.97	43.40	SR 800 in Warren Township	SR 7 in Powhatan Point	1923	current
SR 149	36.09	58.08	SR 7 in Bellaire	SR 9 in Athens Township	1923	current
SR 150	13.30	21.40	US 250 in Mount Pleasant Township	SR 7 in Rayland	1923	current
SR 151	43.06	69.30	US 250 in Monroe Township	SR 7 in Steubenville Township	1923	current
SR 152	20.20	32.51	SR 150 in Dillonvale	SR 151 in Smithfield	1923	current
SR 152	6.18	9.95	US 22 in Bloomingdale	SR 7 in Empire	1943	current
SR 153	—	—	Wellsville	West Point	1923	1931
SR 153	14.69	23.64	SR 43 in Canton	SR 183 in Washington Township	1932	current
SR 154	16.27	26.18	US 30/SR 45/SR 164/SR 517 in Lisbon	PA 251 at Pennsylvania state line in Middleton Township	1923	current
SR 155	—	—	Sandyville	Minerva	1923	1926
SR 155	7.45	11.99	SR 93 in Shawnee	SR 13 in Corning	1926	current
SR 156	—	—	Nashport	Muskingum Township	1923	1962
SR 157	—	—	Union Township	Union Township	1923	1958
SR 158	18.11	29.15	US 22/SR 37/SR 188 in Lancaster	US 40 in Kirkersville	1923	current
SR 159	30.91	49.74	US 50/US 23 Bus./SR 104 in Chillicothe	US 22 in Hocking Township	1923	current
SR 160	—	—	London	Delaware	1923	1926
SR 160	38.82	62.47	SR 7 in Gallipolis	SR 93 in Hamden	1926	current
SR 161	57.80	93.02	SR 29 in Mutual	SR 37 in St. Albans Township	1923	current
SR 162	83.32	134.09	SR 18/SR 67 in Republic	SR 18 in Akron	1923	current
SR 163	46.27	74.46	US 20/US 23 in Troy Township	Hartshorn Road in Danbury Township	1923	current
SR 164	63.46	102.13	SR 212 in Orange Township	Western Reserve Road/I-680 in Beaver Township	1923	current
SR 165	32.31	52.00	US 62/SR 173 on Smith–Knox township line	Taggart Road in Unity Township	1923	current
SR 166	11.40	18.35	US 6 in Hambden Township	SR 534 in Trumbull Township	1923	current
SR 167	14.08	22.66	SR 46/SR 307 in Jefferson	PA 198 at Pennsylvania state line in Pierpont Township	1923	current
SR 168	8.45	13.60	US 422/SR 88/SR 528 in Parkman Township	SR 87/SR 700 in Burton	1923	current
SR 169	6.76	10.88	US 422 in Weathersfield Township	US 422/SR 45 in Warren	1923	current
SR 170	36.54	58.81	US 30/SR 7/SR 11 in St. Clair Township	US 62 in Youngstown	1923	current
SR 171	11.76	18.93	SR 183 in Waynesburg	SR 9 in Washington Township	1923	current
SR 172	46.98	75.61	US 30 in Sugar Creek Township	US 30 in Center Township	1923	current
SR 173	20.98	33.76	SR 44 on Nimishillen–Marlboro township line	SR 9/SR 14 in Salem	1923	current
SR 174	9.56	15.39	Old Mill Road in Gates Mills	US 20/SR 640 in Willoughby	1923	current
SR 175	15.70	25.27	SR 43 on Bedford Heights–Solon city line	SR 283 in Euclid	1923	current
SR 176	19.42	31.25	I-77/SR 21 in Richfield	I-71 in Cleveland	1923	current
SR 177	—	—	East Union Township	Orrville	1923	1926
SR 177	—	—	Washington Township	Washington Township	1926	1926
SR 177	—	—	Goshen Township	New Philadelphia	1926	1932
SR 177	23.58	37.95	SR 4/SR 129 in Hamilton	SR 227 at Indiana state line in Dixon Township	1938	current
SR 178	—	—	Franklin Township	Plymouth	1923	1959
SR 179	15.53	24.99	SR 39/SR 60 in Washington Township	SR 60 in Hayesville	1923	current
SR 180	—	—	Savannah	Fitchville	1923	1926
SR 180	29.55	47.56	SR 159 in Green Township	US 33 in Falls Township	1926	current
SR 181	4.47	7.19	SR 61 in Crestline	SR 309 in Springfield Township	1923	current
SR 182	7.97	12.83	Upper Sandusky	Nevada	1923	c. 2005
SR 183	—	—	Toledo	Toledo	1923	1951
SR 183	43.38	69.81	SR 800 in Sandy Township	SR 14 in Edinburg Township	1962	current
SR 184	—	—	Grand Rapids	Tontogany	1923	1941
SR 184	10.14	16.32	US 23/US 223/SR 51 in Sylvania	I-75 in Toledo	1969	current
SR 185	—	—	McClure	McClure	1923	1926
SR 185	—	—	Old Fort	Bellevue	1926	1937
SR 185	21.74	34.99	US 127 in York Township	US 36 in Piqua	1940	current
SR 186	3.77	6.07	US 224/SR 15 in Liberty Township	SR 235/SR 613 in McComb	1923	current
SR 187	—	—	Leipsic	McComp	1923	1930
SR 187	8.22	13.23	SR 56 in Somerford Township	SR 29 in Goshen Township	1931	current
SR 188	—	—	Greensburg Township	Holgate	1923	1926
SR 188	39.04	62.83	US 22/SR 56 in Circleville	SR 204 in Thornville	1926	current
SR 189	11.58	18.64	US 224/SR 66 in Ottoville	SR 12/SR 115 in Sugar Creek Township	1923	current
SR 190	8.93	14.37	SR 66/SR 697 in Delphos	US 224 in Jackson Township	1923	current
SR 191	10.88	17.51	US 6 in West Unity	US 20A/US 127 in West Unity	1923	current
SR 192	—	—	Bryan	Springfield Township	1923	1955
SR 193	—	—	Hicksville	Hicksville	1923	1938
SR 193	57.95	93.26	I-680 in Youngstown	SR 531 in North Kingsville	1969	current
SR 194	—	—	Payne	Paulding	1923	1926
SR 194	—	—	Chatford	Willard	1926	1969
SR 195	3.59	5.78	CR 65/CR 110 in Marion Township	SR 309 in Marion Township	1923	current
SR 196	10.21	16.43	US 33/SR 385 in Goshen Township	SR 117 in Auglaize Township	1923	current
SR 197	25.27	40.67	US 127/SR 29/SR 703 in Celina	SR 198 in Moulton Township	1923	current
SR 198	12.52	20.15	US 33/SR 67/SR 501 in Wapakoneta	SR 117 in Amanda Township	1923	current
SR 199	—	—	Dawn	Dawn	1923	1923
SR 199	62.16	100.04	US 23 in Pitt Township	US 20/SR 795 in Perrysburg	1924	current
SR 200	—	—	Liberty Township	Neave Township	1923	1931
SR 200	—	—	LaGrange	Belden	1932	1936
SR 200	—	—	Medina	Parma	1938	1938
SR 201	21.69	34.91	SR 4/SR 202 in Dayton	SR 55 in Lostcreek Township	1923	current
SR 202	20.06	32.28	SR 4/SR 201 in Dayton	SR 55 in Troy	1923	current
SR 203	22.10	35.57	SR 37 in Radnor Township	SR 309 in Big Island Township	1923	current
SR 204	37.79	60.82	SR 256 in Pickerington	US 22 in Madison Township	1923	current
SR 205	6.94	11.17	US 62/SR 514 in Danville	SR 3 in Brown Township	1923	current
SR 206	15.13	24.35	SR 541 in Perry Township	US 62 in Richland Township	1923	current
SR 207	—	—	Hanover	Fallsbury Township	1923	1937
SR 207	31.27	50.32	SR 159 near Chillicothe	US 62/SR 3/SR 56 in Mount Sterling	1962	current
SR 208	11.19	18.01	SR 60 in Dresden	SR 93 in Adamsville	1923	current
SR 209	16.71	26.89	SR 83 in Highland Township	I-77/SR 821 in Byesville	1923	current
SR 210	—	—	Roscoe	Roscoe	1923	1953
SR 211	1.23	1.98	SR 39 in Dover	SR 800 in Dover	1923	current
SR 212	32.09	51.64	US 250 in Sugar Creek Township	SR 151 in Bowerston	1923	current
SR 213	18.61	29.95	SR 7 in Island Creek Township	SR 7 in Saline Township	1923	current
SR 214	—	—	Blaine	Bellaire	1923	1978
SR 215	4.61	7.42	SR 821 in Noble Township	SR 285 in Center Township	1923	current
SR 216	6.56	10.56	SR 78 in Murray City	SR 93 in New Straitsville	1923	current
SR 217	17.47	28.12	SR 141 in Lawrence Township	SR 7 in Rome Township	1923	current
SR 218	19.56	31.48	SR 217 in Rome Township	SR 7 in Gallipolis Township	1923	current
SR 219	—	—	Rome Township	Rome Township	1923	1924
SR 219	37.17	59.82	CR 300N in Washington Township	I-75 in Botkins	1925	current
SR 220	14.00	22.53	SR 772 in Pebble Township	SR 32/SR 124 in Seal Township	1923	current
SR 221	8.00	12.87	US 52 in Higginsport	SR 125 in Georgetown	1923	current
SR 222	29.14	46.90	US 52 in Chilo	US 50 in Stonelick Township	1923	current
SR 223	—	—	Ross	McGonigle	1923	1926
SR 223	—	—	Holland	Holland	1926	1930
SR 224	—	—	Hamilton	Fairhaven	1923	1933
SR 225	20.00	32.19	SR 183 in Alliance	SR 5 in Paris Township	1923	current
SR 226	—	—	Minerva	Minerva	1923	1927
SR 226	14.84	23.88	SR 3/SR 179 in Washington Township	SR 3 in Wooster Township	1929	current
SR 227	—	—	Jewett	Jewett	1923	1962
SR 228	1.30	2.09	SR 19 in Adams Township	SR 101 in Adams Township	1923	current
SR 229	—	—	Colby	Bellevue	1923	1924
SR 229	—	—	Tiffin	Republic	1925	1926
SR 229	—	—	Bellevue	Strongs Ridge	1926	1929
SR 229	50.97	82.03	SR 47 in Waldo Township	US 36 in Newcastle Township	1931	current
SR 230	—	—	Fremont	Fremont	1923	1957
SR 230	—	—	Perrysburg	Perrysburg	1962	1971
SR 231	35.70	57.45	Morral-Kirkpatrick Road in Morral	SR 18/SR 100/SR 101 in Tiffin	1923	current
SR 232	—	—	Berea	Kamms	1923	1928
SR 232	11.46	18.44	US 52 in Monroe Township	SR 125 in Bethel	1930	current
SR 233	12.25	19.71	SR 93/SR 279 in Oak Hill	SR 141 in Perry Township	1924	current
SR 234	—	—	West Lafayette	Shanesville	1924	1929
SR 234	—	—	Warsaw	Shreve	1930	1937
SR 235	133.18	214.33	US 68 in Xenia Township	SR 65 in Washington Township	1924	current
SR 236	8.05	12.96	SR 21 in Massillon	SR 93 in Franklin Township	1924	current
SR 237	—	—	Buckeye Lake	Hebron	1924	1932
SR 237	13.79	22.19	SR 82 in Strongsville	US 6/US 20/SR 2 in Lakewood	1935	current
SR 238	1.04	1.67	US 62/SR 3 near Washington Court House	SR 38 in Bloomingburg	1924	c. 2014
SR 239	1.22	1.96	US 52 in Washington Township	SR 73/SR 104 in Washington Township	1924	current
SR 240	—	—	Lucasville	Lucasville	1924	1938
SR 240	—	—	East Harbor State Park	East Harbor State Park	1948	1967
SR 241	50.36	81.05	US 62/SR 39 in Millersburg	SR 18 in Akron	1924	current
SR 242	3.67	5.91	US 127 in Richland Township	SR 121 in Wayne Township	1924	2013
SR 243	18.39	29.60	US 52 in Coal Grove	SR 7 in Union Township	1925	current
SR 244	—	—	Newport	Newport	1925	1961
SR 245	—	—	Bloomfield	Matamoras	1925	1934
SR 245	36.03	57.98	SR 29 in Adams Township	US 33/US 36/SR 4 in Paris Township	1962	current
SR 246	6.07	9.77	US 20 in Toledo	SR 51 in Toledo	1925	current
SR 247	36.35	58.50	Ohio River in Monroe Township	SR 73 in Hillsboro	1925	current
SR 248	9.15	14.73	SR 7 in Chester Township	SR 124 in Olive Township	1925	current
SR 249	—	—	Ney	Ney	1925	1926
SR 249	14.45	23.26	CR 49 in Milford Township	SR 15 in Ney	1926	current
SR 250	—	—	Lakeville	Burnetts Corners	1925	1928
SR 251	4.81	7.74	US 50 in Perry Township	US 68 in Jefferson Township	1925	current
SR 252	23.04	37.08	SR 18/SR 57 in York Township	US 6 in Bay Village	1925	current
SR 253	0.56	0.90	KY 10 at Kentucky state line in Green Township	US 52 in Green Township	1989	current
SR 254	17.15	27.60	SR 57 in Sheffield Township	US 6/US 20/SR 2 in Lakewood	1929	current
SR 255	—	—	Ada	Mount Cory	1926	1926
SR 255	—	—	New Philadelphia	Reeds Run	1926	1932
SR 255	18.08	29.10	SR 800 in Center Township	SR 7 in Lee Township	1935	current
SR 256	—	—	Toledo	Toledo	1926	1926
SR 256	25.99	41.83	US 40 in Reynoldsburg	SR 13 in Thorn Township	1926	current
SR 257	26.19	42.15	US 33/SR 47 in Dublin	SR 47 in Prospect	1926	current
SR 258	25.62	41.23	US 36 in Newcomerstown	SR 800 in Rush Township	1926	current
SR 259	4.41	7.10	SR 416 in Goshen Township	SR 39 in New Philadelphia	1926	current
SR 260	36.67	59.01	SR 7 in Matamoras	SR 78 in Stock Township	1926	current
SR 261	25.88	41.65	SR 94 in Wadsworth	SR 59 in Franklin Township	1926	current
SR 262	—	—	Osceola	Melmore	1926	1967
SR 263	—	—	East Liverpool	East Palestine	1926	1926
SR 263	—	—	Sylvania	Toledo	1926	1939
SR 264	16.58	26.68	US 50 in Cleves	US 27/US 42/US 52/US 127 in Cincinnati	1926	current
SR 265	—	—	Beverly	Reinersville	1926	1926
SR 265	18.36	29.55	US 40 in Center Township	SR 147 in Warren Township	1926	current
SR 266	13.86	22.31	SR 377 in Penn Township	SR 60 in Center Township	1926	current
SR 267	5.39	8.67	SR 7/SR 39 in East Liverpool	US 30/SR 7/SR 11 in St. Clair Township	1926	current
SR 268	—	—	Bridgetown	Cheviot	1928	1975
SR 269	28.08	45.19	SR 4 on Sherman–Thompson township line	East Harbor State Park entrance in Danbury Township	1931	current
SR 270	—	—	Perrysburg	Perrysburg	1928	1962
SR 271	—	—	Montpelier	Bridgewater Township	1930	1931
SR 271	—	—	Martinsburg	Birmingham	1932	1962
SR 272	—	—	Canton	Canton	1930	1961
SR 273	19.80	31.87	Maple Lane in Richland Township	SR 31 in Mount Victory	1930	current
SR 274	52.70	84.81	US 127 in Marion Township	SR 273 in Rushcreek Township	1930	current
SR 275	—	—	Rosewood	Marysville	1930	1962
SR 276	6.46	10.40	SR 133 in Williamsburg	US 50/SR 132 in Owensville	1930	current
SR 277	—	—	Chillicothe	Mount Sterling	1930	1962
SR 278	27.61	44.43	US 50 in Madison Township	SR 595 in Green Township	1930	current
SR 279	20.11	32.36	SR 139 in Hamilton Township	US 35 in Raccoon Township	1930	current
SR 280	—	—	Amesville	Trimble	1930	1962
SR 281	50.71	81.61	US 24 in Defiance	US 6 on Montgomery–Freedom township line	1930	current
SR 282	3.05	4.91	SR 305 in Nelson Township	US 422 in Parkman Township	1930	current
SR 283	—	—	Holland	Holland	1931	1931
SR 283	29.46	47.41	US 6 in Cleveland	US 20 in Painesville	1932	current
SR 284	17.42	28.03	SR 83 in Bristol Township	SR 146 in Salt Creek Township	1930	current
SR 285	27.93	44.95	SR 821 in Caldwell	US 22 in Madison Township	1931	current
SR 286	9.97	16.05	US 50 in Jackson Township	SR 134 in Clay Township	1931	current
SR 287	13.69	22.03	SR 245 in Monroe Township	US 33/SR 739 in Allen Township	1931	current
SR 288	—	—	Willowick	Willoughby	1931	1940
SR 288	6.82	10.98	SR 309 in Washington Township	SR 97 in North Bloomfield Township	1953	current
SR 289	—	—	New Haven	New Haven	1931	1940
SR 289	9.93	15.98	US 422/SR 193 in Youngstown	Pennsylvania state line in Poland Township	1950	current
SR 290	—	—	Salem Township	Wayne Township	1932	1962
SR 291	—	—	Liberty Township	Liberty Township	1932	1945
SR 291	4.14	6.66	Fowles Road in Middleburg Heights	SR 17 on Brook Park–Cleveland city line	1951	current
SR 292	26.49	42.63	US 33 in Jefferson Township	SR 31 in Buck Township	1932	current
SR 293	6.28	10.11	SR 53 in Jackson Township	Cass Street (CR 47) in Wharton	1932	current
SR 294	24.20	38.95	SR 37 in Jackson Township	SR 98 in Dallas Township	1932	current
SR 295	24.00	38.62	SR 65 in Grand Rapids	Silberhorn Highway in Berkey	1932	current
SR 296	—	—	Reedtown	Bellevue	1932	1936
SR 296	10.52	16.93	SR 29 in Salem Township	SR 245 in Wayne Township	1962	current
SR 297	—	—	Wayne	Bradner	1932	1938
SR 297	2.53	4.07	US 30/US 62 in Canton	SR 172 in Canton	1977	2025
SR 298	—	—	Chatfield	Willard	1932	1967
SR 299	—	—	Milan	Huron	1932	1966
SR 300	6.33	10.19	US 6 in Madison Township	US 20 in Woodville Township	1932	current
SR 301	45.30	72.90	SR 302 in Chester Township	US 6 in Sheffield Lake	1932	current
SR 302	28.44	45.77	SR 83 in Wooster	US 250/SR 60 in Savannah	1932	current
SR 303	75.66	121.76	US 20 in Wakeman	SR 82 in Braceville Township	1932	current
SR 304	9.95	16.01	US 422 in Girard	PA 318 at Pennsylvania state line in Hubbard Township	1932	current
SR 305	33.90	54.56	SR 82/SR 700 in Hiram	PA 718 at Pennsylvania state line in Hartford Township	1932	current
SR 306	27.41	44.11	SR 43 in Aurora	SR 283 in Mentor	1932	current
SR 307	22.99	37.00	SR 528 in Madison Township	SR 193 in Dorset Township	1933	current
SR 308	3.00	4.83	SR 229 in Gambier	US 36 in Monroe Township	1932	current
SR 309	—	—	Tunnel Hill	Roscoe	1932	1934
SR 309	103.54	166.63	US 30 in Marion Township	US 30 in Mansfield	1973	current
SR 310	13.97	22.48	SR 204 in Liberty Township	SR 37 in Liberty Township	1932	current
SR 311	—	—	Brookville	Arlington	1932	1964
SR 312	9.14	14.71	SR 93 in Falls Township	SR 664 in Rush Creek Township	1932	current
SR 313	34.35	55.28	SR 146 in Salt Creek Township	SR 147 in Beaver Township	1932	current
SR 314	38.75	62.36	US 36/SR 3 in Centerburg	SR 61 in Sharon Township	1932	current
SR 315	22.48	36.18	I-70/I-71 in Columbus	US 23 in Delaware Township	1933	current
SR 316	14.05	22.61	SR 56 in Monroe Township	SR 752 in Ashville	1931	current
SR 317	18.89	30.40	US 23/SR 665 in Hamilton Township	US 62 in Gahanna	1932	current
SR 318	—	—	Jackson Center	Uniopolis	1932	1936
SR 319	0.56	0.90	Washington Street in Burkettsville	SR 118 on Allen–Granville township line	1932	current
SR 320	3.12	5.02	US 35 in Jackson Township	SR 121 in New Paris	1932	current
SR 321	9.07	14.60	SR 134 in Clay Township	US 62 on White Oak–Concord township line	1932	current
SR 323	18.66	30.03	SR 41 in South Solon	SR 56 in Pleasant Township	1932	current
SR 324	4.44	7.15	SR 160 in Clinton Township	SR 93 in Clinton Township	1932	current
SR 325	24.07	38.74	SR 141 in Perry Township	SR 124 in Salem Township	1932	current
SR 326	1.2	1.9	Holland	Holland	1932	1934
SR 326	2.1	3.4	Marietta	Marietta	1935	1967
SR 327	47.35	76.20	US 35 in Bloomfield Township	SR 180 in Adelphi	1933	current
SR 328	22.72	36.56	SR 93 in Elk Township	US 33 in Logan	1932	current
SR 329	23.80	38.30	US 50/SR 32 in Rome Township	SR 13 in Trimble	1932	current
SR 330	3.00	4.83	SR 15 in Amanda Township	SR 568 in Biglick Township	1932	current
SR 331	18.09	29.11	US 22 in Moorefield Township	US 40 in Richland Township	1932	current
SR 332	12.89	20.74	SR 151 in North Township	SR 9/SR 39/SR 43 in Carrollton	1933	current
SR 333	—	—	Dillonvale	Smithfield	1932	1937
SR 333	3.00	4.83	Sylvania	Sylvania	1946	1962
SR 334	—	—	Leesville	Amsterdam	1932	1937
SR 334	4.24	6.82	US 68 in German Township	SR 4 in Moorefield Township	1969	current
SR 335	42.41	68.25	US 52 in Portsmouth	US 23/SR 104/SR 220 in Waverly	1933	current
SR 336	—	—	Cecil	Emmet	1932	1945
SR 337	—	—	Antiquity	Racine	1932	1936
SR 338	2.32	3.73	US 33 near Racine	SR 124 near Racine	1932	2012
SR 339	34.57	55.64	SR 618 in Belpre Township	SR 821 in Jefferson Township	1933	current
SR 340	13.18	21.21	SR 284 in Meigs Township	SR 821 in Belle Valley	1933	current
SR 341	—	—	Beach City	Beach City	1933	1941
SR 342	5.27	8.48	SR 258 in Perry Township	SR 800 in Freeport	1933	current
SR 343	3.37	5.42	US 68 in Yellow Springs	SR 72 in Clifton	1933	current
SR 344	10.12	16.29	SR 9/SR 14 in Salem	SR 164 in Columbiana	1935	current
SR 345	11.74	18.89	SR 13/SR 37 in New Lexington	US 22 in Newton Township	1935	current
SR 346	20.77	33.43	Wellston	Albany	1935	1983
SR 347	20.96	33.73	SR 287 in Zane Township	SR 37 in Leesburg Township	1935	current
SR 348	32.24	51.89	SR 125 in Tiffin Township	US 23/SR 728 in Valley Township	1935	current
SR 349	2.37	3.81	SR 93 in Wellston	SR 160 in Hamden	1934	current
SR 350	27.40	44.10	SR 123 in Turtle Creek Township	SR 28/SR 73 in New Vienna	1935	current
SR 351	—	—	Marietta	Marietta	1935	1969
SR 352	—	—	Beach City	Bolivar	1935	1938
SR 353	4.60	7.40	US 62 in Jefferson Township	SR 125 in Byrd Township	1935	current
SR 354	—	—	New Garden	Lisbon	1934	1938
SR 355	1.37	2.20	Eaton	Eaton	1934	c. 1999
SR 356	10.74	17.28	US 50 in Knox Township	SR 56 in Waterloo Township	1934	current
SR 357	2.35	3.78	West Shore Boulevard in Put-in-Bay Township on South Bass Island	Lake Erie in Put-in-Bay Township on South Bass Island	1934	current
SR 358	0.92	1.48	SR 163 in Erie Township	SR 2 in Erie Township	1934	current
SR 359	1.02	1.64	Boston Township	Boston Township	1934	c. 1988
SR 360	1.94	3.12	SR 79 in Walnut Township	SR 79 in Buckeye Lake	1938	current
SR 361	4.67	7.52	US 23 in Pickaway Township	SR 159 in Pickaway Township	1934	current
SR 362	4.56	7.34	SR 66 in Fort Loramie	SR 66 in Minster	1934	current
SR 363	1.43	2.30	Lotus Road in McLean Township	SR 119 in Jackson Township	1934	current
SR 364	16.73	26.92	SR 705 in Patterson-McLean	SR 29 in Noble Township	1936	current
SR 365	0.16	0.26	SR 235/SR 366 in Stokes Township	Indian Lake State Park boat ramp in Stokes Township	1934	current
SR 366	9.78	15.74	US 33 in Stokes Township	SR 117 in Richland Township	1934	current
SR 367	—	—	Russells Point	Russells Point	1934	1937
SR 368	2.59	4.17	SR 366 in Richland Township	CR 272/CR 286 in Stokes Township	1934	current
SR 369	1.45	2.33	SR 4 in Bethel Township	US 40 in Bethel Township	1934	current
SR 370	1.21	1.95	John Bryan State Park entrance in Miami Township	SR 343 in Miami Township	1934	current
SR 371	0.40	0.64	Shawnee State Park entrance in Union Township	SR 73 in Union Township	1934	current
SR 372	0.68	1.09	US 23/SR 104 in Franklin Township	Scioto Trail State Forest boundary in Franklin Township	1934	current
SR 373	3.39	5.46	SR 93 in Elizabeth Township	SR 93 in Decatur Township	1934	current
SR 374	25.26	40.65	SR 56 in Benton Township	US 33 in Good Hope Township	1934	current
SR 375	—	—	Marietta	Marietta	1935	1969
SR 376	24.75	39.83	SR 266 in Windsor Township	SR 60 in Blue Rock Township	1934	current
SR 377	18.33	29.50	SR 550 in Bern Township	SR 78 in Penn Township	1934	current
SR 378	9.46	15.22	SR 243 in Union Township	SR 141 in Aid Township	1935	current
SR 379	14.73	23.71	SR 78 in Seneca Township	SR 147 on Somerset–Beaver township line	1935	current
SR 380	18.01	28.98	US 22/SR 3 in Adams Township	US 42/US 68/US 35 Bus. in Xenia	1935	current
SR 381	—	—	Greenville	Ansonia	1935	1936
SR 382	—	—	Aurora	South Russell	1935	1936
SR 383	1.50	2.41	CR 60 in Reading Township	SR 13 in Reading Township	1935	current
SR 384	—	—	Williams Center	Ridgeville Corners	1935	1957
SR 385	6.30	10.14	US 33/SR 196 in Goshen Township	SR 117 in Roundhead Township	1935	current
SR 386	—	—	Violet Township	Liberty Township	1935	1936
SR 387	—	—	Sandusky	Sandusky	1935	1962
SR 412	12.42	19.99	US 20/SR 19 in Riley Township	SR 101 in Townsend Township	1969	current
SR 416	14.98	24.11	US 36 in Clay Township	SR 800 in Dover Township	1969	current
SR 420	2.89	4.65	US 20/US 23 in Troy Township	I-280/Ohio Turnpike in Lake Township	1969	current
SR 421	3.37	5.42	US 42/US 224 in Harrisville Township	US 42/US 224 in Harrisville Township	1959	current
SR 423	17.09	27.50	SR 47/SR 98 in Waldo	US 23/SR 231 in Grand Prairie Township	1969	current
SR 424	25.77	41.47	US 24 in Defiance (Until 2008)	Napoleon	1964	2012
SR 430	13.11	21.10	SR 309 in Ontario	SR 603 in Mifflin Township	1960	current
SR 435	4.08	6.57	US 35 in Jefferson Township	SR 729 in Jasper Township	2003	current
SR 440	—	—	Englewood	St. Clairsville	1959	1967
SR 444	9.03	14.53	SR 4 in Dayton	I-675 on Bath–Mad River township line	1959	current
SR 446	1.51	2.43	US 224 in Canfield	SR 46 in Canfield Township	1984	current
SR 450	1.06	1.71	Milford Parkway in Union Township	US 50 in Miami Township	2004	current
SR 500	13.32	21.44	State Line Road/Paulding Road in Benton Township	SR 111 in Paulding	1937	current
SR 501	11.93	19.20	US 33/SR 67/SR 198 in Wapakoneta	SR 117 in Shawnee Township	1937	current
SR 502	9.71	15.63	Greenville Pike in Washington Township	SR 49/SR 121/SR 571 in Greenville	1937	current
SR 503	40.53	65.23	US 127 in Seven Mile	SR 121 in Wayne Lakes	1937	current
SR 504	1.29	2.08	Staunton Township	Staunton Township	1937	1982
SR 505	10.39	16.72	US 52 in Higginsport	SR 125 in Clark Township	1937	current
SR 506	4.34	6.98	SR 124 in Marshall Township	SR 753 in Brush Creek Township	1937	current
SR 507	3.09	4.97	US 68 in Salem Township	SR 245 in Salem Township	1937	current
SR 508	9.46	15.22	SR 235 in De Graff	US 68 in West Liberty	1937	current
SR 509	—	—	Carey	McCuthenville	1937	1964
SR 510	7.03	11.31	SR 101 in Clyde	US 6 in Riley Township	1937	current
SR 511	50.27	80.90	SR 39 in Green Township	US 20 in New Russia Township	1937	current
SR 512	—	—	Newark	Newark	1937	1961
SR 513	27.19	43.76	SR 146 in Summerfield	US 22 in Madison Township	1937	current
SR 514	19.84	31.93	US 62/SR 514 in Danville	SR 229 on Ripley–Clinton township line	1937	current
SR 515	5.50	8.85	SR 39 in Walnut Creek Township	US 62 in Paint Township	1937	current
SR 516	7.70	12.39	SR 93 in Wayne Township	SR 39 in Dover Township	1937	current
SR 517	8.50	13.68	US 30/SR 45/SR 164/SR 154 in Lisbon	SR 7/SR 558 in Fairfield Township	1937	current
SR 518	11.10	17.86	SR 644 in Franklin Township	US 30/SR 45 in Madison Township	1937	current
SR 519	11.08	17.83	US 22 in Moorefield Township	US 250 in Short Creek Township	1937	current
SR 520	13.47	21.68	SR 514 in Knox Township	US 62 in Killbuck Township	1937	current
SR 521	13.62	21.92	SR 37 in Delaware	SR 656 in Porter Township	1937	current
SR 522	—	—	Thompson Township	Trumbull	1937	1939
SR 522	16.58	26.68	US 52 in Porter Township	SR 93 in Elizabeth Township	1947	current
SR 523	3.79	6.10	SR 19 in Rice Township	SR 53 in Rice Township	1939	current
SR 524	—	—	Simons	North Richmond	1937	1941
SR 524	8.10	13.04	SR 164 in Bergholz	SR 39 in Fox Township	1947	current
SR 526	—	—	Akron	Mogadore	1937	1979
SR 527	—	—	Ghent	Kent	1937	1941
SR 527	0.56	0.90	WV 527 at West Virginia state line in Chesapeake	SR 7 in Chesapeake	1970	current
SR 528	30.36	48.86	US 422/SR 88/SR 528 in Parkman Township	US 20 in North Madison	1937	current
SR 529	17.61	28.34	SR 95 in Marion	SR 61 in Lincoln Township	1939	current
SR 530	7.86	12.65	SR 60 in Lowell	SR 821 in Salem Township	1937	current
SR 531	22.72	36.56	SR 534 in Geneva-on-the-Lake	SR 7 in Conneaut	1937	current
SR 532	3.68	5.92	US 224 in Springfield–Portage township line	I-76 in Tallmadge	1937	current
SR 533	1.80	2.90	SR 540 in Jefferson Township	SR 47 in Jefferson Township	1937	2014
SR 534	69.31	111.54	US 62/SR 173 on Goshen–Butler township line	SR 531 in Geneva-on-the-Lake	1937	current
SR 535	4.85	7.81	SR 283 in Painesville	US 20 in Painesville Township	1937	current
SR 536	12.63	20.33	WV 7 at West Virginia state line in Ohio Township	SR 78 in Adams Township	1937	current
SR 537	4.98	8.01	SR 260 in Bethel Township	SR 26 in Washington Township	1937	current
SR 538	—	—	Pierpont Township	Pierpont Township	1937	1938
SR 539	—	—	Manchester Township	Manchester Township	1937	1959
SR 539	13.43	21.61	SR 302 in Chester Township	SR 301 in West Salem	1964	current
SR 540	8.72	14.03	US 68/SR 47 in Bellefontaine	SR 292 in Perry Township	1937	current
SR 541	—	—	Mentor Township	Mentor Township	1937	1942
SR 541	52.43	84.38	US 62/SR 568 in Martinsburg	I-77 in Liberty Township	1962	current
SR 542	15.81	25.44	SR 212 in Monroe Township	SR 183 in Magnolia	1937	current
SR 543	—	—	Springcreek Township	Orange Township	1937	1959
SR 544	—	—	Sharon Township	Sharon Township	1937	1959
SR 545	16.94	27.26	SR 39 in Mansfield	US 250/SR 60 in Savannah	1937	current
SR 546	11.43	18.39	SR 13 in Middlebury Township	US 42/SR 97 in Lexington	1937	current
SR 547	8.18	13.16	SR 269 in Sherman Township	US 20/SR 18 in Monroeville	1937	current
SR 548	—	—	Mount Eaton	Wadsworth	1937	1967
SR 549	—	—	Mohicanville	Wooster	1937	1938
SR 550	—	—	Pebble Township	Waverly	1937	1946
SR 550	40.58	65.31	US 33 in Athens Township	SR 7 in Warren Township	1976	current
SR 551	2.87	4.62	SR 220 in Pee Pee Township	SR 104 in Pee Pee Township	1937	current
SR 552	1.75	2.82	SR 220 in Pee Pee Township	SR 104 in Pee Pee Township	1937	current
SR 553	2.34	3.77	SR 7 in Crown City	SR 218 in Guyan Township	1937	current
SR 554	20.23	32.56	SR 325 in Raccoon Township	SR 7 in Cheshire	1937	current
SR 555	62.36	100.36	US 50/SR 7/SR 32 in Belpre Township	SR 60 in Wayne Township	1937	current
SR 556	13.24	21.31	SR 145 in Beallsville	SR 7 in Clarington	1937	current
SR 557	10.19	16.40	SR 643 in Clark Township	US 62/SR 39 in Berlin Township	1937	current
SR 558	15.71	25.28	SR 45 in Salem Township	SR 46/SR 170 in East Palestine	1938	current
SR 559	16.64	26.78	SR 4/SR 29 in Mechanicsburg	SR 287 in Zane Township	1937	current
SR 560	9.94	16.00	SR 55 in Mad River Township	SR 29 in Concord Township	1937	current
SR 561	7.29	11.73	US 50/SR 32/SR 125 in Cincinnati	Vine Street/Seymour Street in Cincinnati	1938	current
SR 562	3.43	5.52	I-75 in Cincinnati	I-71 in Cincinnati	1938	current
SR 563	—	—	Dexter City	Middleburg	1937	1964
SR 564	13.48	21.69	SR 78 in Caldwell	SR 145 in Jefferson Township	1937	current
SR 565	6.98	11.23	SR 145 in Elk Township	SR 260 in Bethel Township	1937	current
SR 566	4.80	7.72	SR 147 in Seneca Township	SR 285 in Wayne Township	1937	current
SR 567	—	—	Northwest Township	Pioneer	1938	1955
SR 568	—	—	Sylvania	Washington Township	1939	1951
SR 568	16.18	26.04	SR 12/SR 37 in Findlay	US 23/SR 103/SR 199 in Carey	1965	current
SR 569	—	—	Jefferson Township	Madison Township	1938	1955
SR 570	—	—	Providence Township	Waterville Township	1937	1961
SR 571	—	—	Bridgewater Township	Bridgewater Township	1937	1955
SR 571	50.47	81.22	SR 28 at Indiana state line in Union City	US 40 in Bethel Township	1962	current
SR 572	—	—	Bailey	Sylvania Township	1937	1945
SR 573	—	—	Tiffin Township	Adams Township	1939	1945
SR 574	4.35	7.00	SR 566 in Seneca Township	SR 313 in Richland Township	1947	current
SR 575	2.60	4.18	Neumans Ferry Dock on Kelleys Island	Division Street on Kelleys Island	1937	current
SR 576	20.52	33.02	SR 2 in Center Township	Hillsdale Road in Bridgewater Township	1937	current
SR 577	—	—	Waterville	Toledo	1939	1951
SR 578	0.19	0.31	SR 65 in Grand Rapids	US 24 in Providence Township	1937	2012
SR 579	10.76	17.32	SR 51 in Lake Township	SR 2 in Benton Township	1937	current
SR 580	—	—	Richland Township	Ridgeville	1939	1957
SR 581	—	—	Toledo	Bono	1937	1939
SR 582	20.09	32.33	SR 65 in Washington Township	SR 105 in Woodville Township	1940	current
SR 584	—	—	Salem Township	Bay Township	1937	1957
SR 585	—	—	Kipton	Oberlin	1937	1939
SR 585	19.91	32.04	SR 3/SR 83 in Wooster	SR 21 in Norton	1969	current
SR 586	29.98	48.25	SR 146 in Licking Township	SR 13 in Mount Vernon	1939	current
SR 587	12.50	20.12	SR 53 in Tymochtee Township	SR 18 in Fostoria	1937	current
SR 588	11.71	18.85	SR 325 in Rio Grande	SR 7 in Gallipolis	1947	current
SR 589	16.67	26.83	SR 55 in Casstown	SR 29 in Green Township	1937	current
SR 590	25.13	40.44	SR 12 in Bettsville	SR 2 in Benton Township	1937	current
SR 591	—	—	Springville	Tiffin	1937	1955
SR 592	—	—	Jackson Towhship	Jackson Township	1937	1955
SR 595	9.18	14.77	US 33 in Green Township	SR 216 in New Straitsville	1937	current
SR 596	—	—	Hebron	Edgewater Beach	1937	1958
SR 598	23.43	37.71	SR 19/SR 61/SR 309 in Galion	SR 103 in New Haven Township	1937	current
SR 600	9.67	15.56	US 23 in Madison Township	US 20 in Washington Township	1937	current
SR 601	5.94	9.56	SR 18 on Norwalk–Townsend township line	SR 113 in Milan	1938	current
SR 602	14.47	23.29	SR 19 in Polk Township	SR 103 in New Washington	1937	current
SR 603	33.58	54.04	SR 95 in Monroe Township	SR 61/SR 98 in Plymouth	1938	current
SR 604	24.04	38.69	US 42 in Jackson Township	SR 94/SR 585 in Chippewa Township	1937	current
SR 605	9.38	15.10	US 62 in New Albany	SR 37 in Trenton Township	1937	current
SR 606	4.26	6.86	SR 3 in Granger Township	SR 94/SR 303 in Hinckley Township	1937	current
SR 607	0.44	0.71	WV 106 at West Virginia state line near Huntington, WV	SR 7 in Proctorville	1986	2007
SR 607	1.69	2.72	SR 60 in Morgan Township	SR 78 in Morgan Township	2011	current
SR 608	19.47	31.33	SR 528 in Middlefield Township	CR 360/CR 412 in Concord Township	1938	current
SR 609	2.65	4.26	SR 7 in Hartford Township	CR 182 in Orangeville	1937	current
SR 611	11.13	17.91	US 6 in Lorain	SR 254 in Avon	1937	current
SR 612	10.1	16.3	SR 82 in Strongsville	SR 10 in Cleveland	1937	1951
SR 613	—	—	Glenwillow	Solon	1937	1945
SR 613	75.86	122.08	State Line Road on Benton–Harrison township line	US 23/SR 18/SR 199 in Fostoria	1970	current
SR 614	—	—	Concord Township	Madison	1937	1942
SR 615	6.87	11.06	SR 306 in Kirtland	SR 283 in Mentor-on-the-Lake	1937	current
SR 616	10.48	16.87	SR 170 in Poland	US 62/SR 7/SR 304 in Hubbard	1939	current
SR 617	4.74	7.63	SR 165 in Springfield Township	PA 351 at Pennsylvania state line in Springfield Township	1937	current
SR 618	7.45	11.99	US 50/SR 7/SR 32 in Belpre Township	SR 7 in Belpre	1937	current
SR 619	28.98	46.64	I-76/US 224 in Akron	SR 183 in Alliance	1937	current
SR 621	5.98	9.62	US 36 in Keene Township	CR 190 in White Eyes Township	1941	current
SR 622	—	—	Poland Township	Poland Township	1937	1941
SR 623	—	—	Alliance	Alliance	1938	1941
SR 625	3.36	5.41	US 224 in Boardman Township	US 62 in Youngstown	1937	current
SR 626	3.46	5.57	SR 165 in Beaver Township	SR 7 in Beaver Township	1937	current
SR 627	—	—	SR 14/US 224 in Deerfield	SR 5 in Paris	1937	1969
SR 627	4.76	7.66	US 30/US 62 in Perry Township	I-77 in Canton	1987	current
SR 628	—	—	North Canton	North Canton	1937	1967
SR 629	—	—	Jackson Township	Youngstown	1937	1941
SR 630	2.56	4.12	SR 170 in New Middletown	PA 317 at Pennsylvania state line in Springfield Township	1937	current
SR 631	—	—	Valley View	Northfield Center Township	1937	1967
SR 632	—	—	Stow	Stow	1937	1966
SR 633	0.58	0.93	US 20 in Wickliffe	Lakeland Boulevard in Wickliffe	1940	current
SR 634	17.95	28.89	SR 189/SR 190 in Fort Jennings	SR 15 in Monroe Township	1937	current
SR 635	15.18	24.43	SR 18 in Bascom	US 6 in Jackson Township	1937	current
SR 636	—	—	Harrison Township	Tully Township	1937	1942
SR 637	23.16	37.27	US 224 on Jackson–Hoaglin township line	SR 66 in Brown Township	1937	current
SR 638	3.99	6.42	US 68 in McArthur Township	SR 273 in Belle Center	1937	current
SR 640	3.35	5.39	SR 283 in Willowick	US 20/SR 174 in Willoughby	1946	current
SR 643	16.25	26.15	SR 83 in Keene Township	SR 93 in Clark Township	1937	current
SR 644	11.60	18.67	SR 39 in Salineville	US 30/SR 9 in Kensington	1937	current
SR 646	28.78	46.32	US 250 in Stock Township	SR 43 in Island Creek Township	1937	current
SR 647	9.96	16.03	SR 7 in Martins Ferry	SR 150 in Mount Pleasant	1939	current
SR 650	9.28	14.93	US 52 in Hanging Rock	SR 522 in Elizabeth Township	1955	current
SR 651	3.99	6.42	SR 643 in Crawford Township	SR 93 in Baltic	1939	current
SR 652	0.31	0.50	12th Street/13th Street in Coal Grove	US 52 in Coal Grove	2012	current
SR 655	—	—	Key	Diles Bottom	1939	1967
SR 656	10.07	16.21	SR 61 in Kingston Township	SR 229 in South Bloomfield Township	1937	current
SR 657	19.84	31.93	SR 13 in Newton Township	US 36/SR 3 in Hilliar Township	1937	current
SR 658	11.07	17.82	SR 209 in Adams Township	SR 541 in Wheeling Township	1937	current
SR 660	6.33	10.19	SR 313 in Westland Township	SR 209 in Jackson Township	1937	current
SR 661	22.22	35.76	SR 16/SR 37 in Granville Township	SR 13 in Mount Vernon	1937	current
SR 662	8.14	13.10	SR 209 in Adams Township	SR 93 in Linton Township	1937	current
SR 663	—	—	Somerset	Crooksville	1937	1937
SR 664	37.08	59.67	SR 56 in Benton Township	SR 256 on Richland–Thorn township line	1937	current
SR 665	25.64	41.26	US 42/SR 38/SR 56/SR 142 in London	US 23/SR 317 in Hamilton Township	1937	current
SR 666	14.17	22.80	SR 60/SR 146 in Zanesville	SR 208 in Madison Township	1937	current
SR 668	29.24	47.06	SR 93 in Falls Township	US 40 in Bowling Green Township	1937	current
SR 669	32.70	52.63	SR 13 in Reading Township	SR 37/SR 78 in Malta	1937	current
SR 670	—	—	Senecaville Lake	Salesville	1937	1973
SR 671	4.58	7.37	SR 327 in Eagle Township	US 50 in Harrison Township	1939	current
SR 672	3.11	5.01	SR 146 in Spencer Township	SR 821 in Buffalo Township	1937	current
SR 673	—	—	Blue Rock	Cumberland	1937	1937
SR 674	16.01	25.77	US 22 on Washington–Clearcreek township line	US 33 in Canal Winchester	1937	current
SR 675	—	—	Buchtel	Trimble Township	1937	1962
SR 676	26.40	42.49	SR 555 in Wesley Township	SR 7 in Marietta	1937	current
SR 677	4.78	7.69	US 50 in Elk Township	SR 278 in Zaleski	1937	current
SR 678	4.00	6.44	SR 374 in Laurel Township	SR 180 in Laurel Township	1937	current
SR 680	—	—	Mineral	Reedsville	1937	1962
SR 681	39.43	63.46	SR 356 in Waterloo Township	SR 124 in Olive Township	1962	current
SR 682	7.75	12.47	US 33/US 50/SR 32 in Athens Township	SR 13 in Chauncey	1937	current
SR 683	8.22	13.23	SR 93 in Clinton Township	US 50 in Richland Township	1937	current
SR 684	3.91	6.29	SR 143 in Scipio Township	SR 681 in Scipio Township	1937	current
SR 685	5.24	8.43	SR 78 in Buchtel	SR 13 in Trimble Township	1937	current
SR 686	—	—	Lawrence Township	Massillon	1937	1941
SR 687	5.70	9.17	SR 241 in Jackson Township	I-77/US 62 in Canton	1937	current
SR 689	7.52	12.10	SR 160 in Wilkesville Township	SR 32 in Columbia Township	1937	current
SR 690	5.00	8.05	US 50/SR 32 in Canaan Township	SR 550 in Ames Township	1937	current
SR 691	10.29	16.56	SR 56 in Waterloo Township	US 33/SR 78 in Nelsonville	1938	current
SR 692	3.19	5.13	SR 692 in Scipio Township	SR 681 in Scipio Township	1937	2013
SR 694	12.00	19.31	SR 114 in Perry Township	US 224 in Glandorf	1937	current
SR 695	—	—	Lloydsville	Lloydsville	1939	1939
SR 696	9.68	15.58	US 30 in Richland Township	SR 12 in Riley Township	1939	current
SR 697	7.54	12.13	SR 116 in Ridge Township	SR 66/SR 190 in Delphos	1938	current
SR 698	6.44	10.36	SR 103 in Van Buren Township	CR 313 in Eagle Township	1937	current
SR 699	2.02	3.25	Kirby	Kirby	1937	1996
SR 700	16.70	26.88	SR 88 in Freedom Township	SR 87/SR 168 in Burton	1942	current
SR 701	8.93	14.37	SR 309 in Marion Township	US 68 on Pleasant–Blanchard township line	1937	current
SR 702	—	—	SR 235 in Stokes Township, Logan County	Turkeyfoot Point on the Indian Lake shoreline in Stokes Township	1940	1977
SR 702	0.64	1.03	Brilliant, Ohio	West Virginia state line in Wells Township, Jefferson County	2023	current
SR 703	14.92	24.01	SR 219 in Montezuma	SR 29/SR 66/SR 116 in St. Marys	1937	current
SR 704	—	—	Willshire	Lima	1937	1939
SR 705	28.80	46.35	SR 49 in Mississinawa Township	SR 29 in Clinton Township	1937	current
SR 706	7.44	11.97	SR 29 in Perry Township	SR 235 in Miami Township	1937	current
SR 707	19.43	31.27	SR 218 at Indiana state line in Black Creek Township	SR 117 in Union Township	1937	current
SR 708	2.32	3.73	SR 235 in Washington Township	Township Road 253 in Washington Township	1937	current
SR 709	9.20	14.81	SR 118 in Ohio City	SR 116 on York–Jennings township line	1938	current
SR 710	4.62	7.44	SR 161 in Columbus	I-270 in Columbus	1969	current
SR 711	3.44	5.54	I-680 in Youngstown	I-80/SR 11 in Liberty Township	1974	current
SR 714	3.07	4.94	Union Township	Salem Township	1937	1982
SR 715	12.40	19.96	US 36 in Union Township	US 36 in Nellie	1939	current
SR 716	6.71	10.80	SR 705 in Osgood	SR 274 in Chickasaw	1937	current
SR 718	10.62	17.09	SR 721 in Newton Township	SR 55 in Troy	1937	current
SR 719	0.61	0.98	US 22/SR 93 on South Zanesville–Zanesville municipal line	SR 555 in Zanesville	1989	current
SR 720	8.20	13.20	SR 65 in Clay Township	US 33 in Russells Point	1937	current
SR 721	17.86	28.74	SR 49 in Union Township	SR 185 on Adams–Newberry township line	1937	current
SR 722	16.74	26.94	SR 121 in Harrison Township	SR 49 in Monroe Township	1937	current
SR 723	—	—	Harveysburg	New Burlington	1939	1945
SR 723	0.85	1.37	I-70 in Cambridge Township	US 22/US 40 in Cambridge	1961	current
SR 724	4.05	6.52	SR 260 in Stock Township	SR 145 in Franklin Township	1937	current
SR 725	48.07	77.36	SR 44 in Israel Township	US 42 in Spring Valley	1937	current
SR 726	14.21	22.87	US 127 in Washington Township	SR 121 in New Madison	1937	current
SR 727	5.46	8.79	SR 131 in Stonelick Township	SR 133 in Wayne Township	1937	current
SR 728	1.93	3.11	US 23/SR 348 in Valley Township	CR 28/CR 180 in Jefferson Township	1975	current
SR 729	33.57	54.03	SR 73/SR 350 in Green Township	SR 323 in Stokes Township	1937	current
SR 730	11.43	18.39	SR 133 in Marion Township	US 68/SR 134 in Wilmington	1939	current
SR 732	30.61	49.26	SR 129 in Reily Township	US 35/US 127/SR 122 in Eaton	1938	current
SR 733	2.25	3.62	SR 124/SR 833 in Pomeroy	US 33/SR 7 in Salisbury Township	2013	current
SR 734	16.58	26.68	SR 72 in Jamestown	SR 38 in Paint Township	1937	current
SR 735	1.41	2.27	US 35 in Gallipolis Township	SR 7 in Addison Township	1969	current
SR 736	8.41	13.53	US 42 in Jerome Township	SR 38 in Marysville	1937	current
SR 739	35.50	57.13	US 33/SR 287 in Allen Township	SR 4/SR 423 in Marion	1937	current
SR 741	27.23	43.82	I-71 in Deerfield Township	I-75 in Moraine	1938	current
SR 743	6.76	10.88	5th Street in Moscow	SR 222 in Washington Township	1937	current
SR 744	10.82	17.41	US 127 in Somers Township	SR 122 in Madison Township	1937	current
SR 745	9.99	16.08	US 33/SR 161 in Dublin	US 42/SR 257 in Concord Township	1937	current
SR 746	13.00	20.92	US 42 in Westfield Township	SR 309 in Caledonia	1937	current
SR 747	11.35	18.27	SR 4 in Glendale	SR 4 in Liberty Township	1937	current
SR 748	5.80	9.33	SR 126 in Morgan Township	SR 129 in Ross Township	1937	current
SR 749	5.51	8.87	US 52 in Pierce Township	SR 132 in Ohio Township	1937	current
SR 750	9.67	15.56	SR 257 in Liberty Township	I-71 in Columbus	1937	current
SR 751	—	—	Madison Township	Columbus	1937	1959
SR 751	15.96	25.69	SR 93 in West Lafayette	I-77 in Stone Creek	1962	current
SR 752	8.43	13.57	US 23 in South Bloomfield	SR 674 on Walnut–Amanda township line	1937	current
SR 753	35.35	56.89	SR 41 in Brush Creek Township	US 22 in Washington Court House	1937	current
SR 754	6.72	10.81	SR 39/SR 60 in Monroe Township	SR 514 in Ripley Township	1962	current
SR 756	13.16	21.18	SR 232 in Monroe Township	SR 505 in Lewis Township	1937	current
SR 757	5.68	9.14	SR 13 in Somerset	SR 204 in Hopewell Township	1938	current
SR 761	4.33	6.97	SR 313 in Wayne Township	SR 265 in Salesville	1974	current
SR 762	14.89	23.96	US 62/SR 3 in Darby Township	CR 385 in Harrison Township	1938	current
SR 763	12.70	20.44	SR 41 in Huntington Township	SR 125 in Byrd Township	1937	current
SR 764	4.16	6.69	SR 93 in Akron	SR 241 in Akron	1946	current
SR 767	0.30	0.48	SR 7 in Bridgeport	US 40/US 250 in Bridgeport	—	—
SR 768	1.70	2.74	US 36 in Mount Vernon	SR 3 in Monroe Township	1946	current
SR 770	10.52	16.93	SR 247 in Seaman	SR 73 in Bratton Township	1937	current
SR 771	7.11	11.44	SR 138 in Paint Township	SR 28 in Leesburg	1937	current
SR 772	45.99	74.01	SR 73 in Rarden	US 50/SR 104 in Chillicothe	1937	current
SR 773	—	—	Rochester Township	Akron	1937	1937
SR 774	14.93	24.03	SR 133 in Franklin Township	US 68 in Pike Township	1938	current
SR 775	35.30	56.81	WV 106 at West Virginia state line in Proctorville	SR 141 in Green Township	1937	current
SR 776	16.27	26.18	SR 335 in Madison Township	SR 139 in Jackson	1938	current
SR 778	0.43	0.69	SR 101 in Adams Township	SR 19 in Adams Township	1942	current
SR 780	—	—	Salem Township	Hamer Township	1937	1946
SR 781	10.99	17.69	SR 41 in Meigs Township	SR 348 in Jefferson Township	1938	current
SR 782	—	—	Columbus	Columbus	1949	1957
SR 785	3.60	5.79	SR 247 in Jackson Township	SR 73 in Jackson Township	1937	current
SR 788	6.27	10.09	SR 93 in Jackson	SR 93 in Coal Township	1939	current
SR 790	7.22	11.62	SR 775 in Mason Township	SR 218 in Guyan Township	1937	current
SR 791	—	—	Canton	Canton	1946	1976
SR 792	5.53	8.90	SR 676 in Wesley Township	SR 266 in Windsor Township	1937	current
SR 793	—	—	Marble Cliff	Columbus	1937	1937
SR 793	4.80	7.72	Hocking Township	US 33 in Lancaster	1959	2006
SR 794	—	—	Washingtonville	Marquis	1937	1942
SR 794	2.51	4.04	US 68 in Green Township	SR 72 in Green Township	1950	2013
SR 795	12.20	19.63	US 20/SR 199 in Perrysburg	SR 51 on Clay–Allen township line	1937	current
SR 796	—	—	Rockbridge	Rockbridge	1938	1964
SR 797	—	—	Franklin Township	Mantua Township	1939	1941
SR 797	1.19	1.92	US 22/US 40 in Perry Township	I-70 in Perry Township	1946	2014
SR 798	5.29	8.51	Colerain Township	Martins Ferry	1939	1978
SR 799	6.05	9.74	SR 800 in Washington Township	CR 21/CR 60 in Nottingham Township	1949	current
SR 800	110.14	177.25	SR 7 in Jackson Township	I-77 in Canton	1969	current
SR 807	0.42	0.68	SR 7 in Newport Township	WV 807 at West Virginia state line in Newport Township	1977	current
SR 814	3.07	4.94	US 36 in Union Township	SR 296 in Salem Township	1982	current
SR 821	48.90	78.70	SR 60 in Muskingum Township	I-77/SR 209 in Byesville	1971	current
SR 822	0.13	0.21	7th Street in Steubenville	SR 7 in Steubenville	1990	current
SR 823	16.00	25.75	US 52 in Sciotodale	US 23 in Lucasville	2018	current
SR 824	0.57	0.92	Lebanon Township	Lebanon Township	1981	2003
SR 833	5.10	8.21	WV 62 in Pomeroy	US 33 / SR 7 / SR 124 near Pomeroy	2003	current
SR 835	6.59	10.61	US 35 in Dayton	US 35 in Beavercreek	1987	current
SR 844	2.40	3.86	I-675 in Beavercreek	Wright-Patterson Air Force Base entrance in Fairborn	1994	current
SR 850	5.04	8.11	SR 588 in Green Township	SR 554 in Springfield Township	1994	current
SR 852	0.94	1.51	Carl Perkins Memorial Bridge in Washington Township	SR 73/SR 104 in Washington Township	1988	current
SR 872	0.63	1.01	SR 7 in Mead Township	WV 2 Spur at West Virginia state line in Mead Township	1986	current
Former; Proposed and unbuilt
