= Ohio State Route 690 =

State highway in Athens County, Ohio, US

State Route 690

Route information
- Maintained by ODOT
- Length: 5.00 mi (8.05 km)
- Existed: 1937–present

Major junctions
- South end: US 50 / SR 32 near Athens
- North end: SR 550 near Amesville

Location
- Country: United States
- State: Ohio
- Counties: Athens

Highway system
- Ohio State Highway System; Interstate; US; State; Scenic
← SR 689	→ SR 691

State Route 690 (SR 690) is a north–south state highway in southeastern Ohio, a U.S. state. The southern terminus of SR 690 is at the concurrency of US 50 and SR 32 about 6 1/2 miles (10.5 km) east of Athens in the community of Canaanville. Its northern terminus is at SR 550 approximately two miles (3.2 km) west of Amesville.

This two-lane state highway was established in the late 1930s. Running entirely within Athens County, SR 690 passes through Wayne National Forest and serves as a quicker route connecting SR 550 to the Athens Bypass.

== Route description ==
SR 690 runs exclusively within Athens County. This state highway is not included as a part of the National Highway System, a network of highways deemed to be most important for the economy, mobility and defense of the nation.

== History ==
SR 690 was designated in 1937 along the routing that it occupies to this day. Originally in Canaanville, the route's southern terminus was located slightly west of where it is currently located along US 50. By 1997, the route was moved to its current alignment and part of its former alignment has been retained as a state highway as the 0.34-mile-long (0.55 km) SR 690-J. Other than the aforementioned realignment and the fact that the highway intersecting the route at its northern terminus was originally designated as US 50 Alternate before later becoming SR 550, the highway has not experienced any major changes to its routing since it first appeared.

== Major intersections ==
The entire route is in Athens County.

Location	mi	km	Destinations	Notes
Canaan Township	0.00	0.00	US 50 / SR 32	
Ames Township	5.00	8.05	SR 550	
1.000 mi = 1.609 km; 1.000 km = 0.621 mi
