= Ohio State Route 683 =

State highway in Vinton County, Ohio, US

State Route 683

Route information
- Maintained by ODOT
- Length: 8.22 mi (13.23 km)
- Existed: 1937–present

Major junctions
- South end: SR 93 near Hamden
- North end: US 50 near McArthur

Location
- Country: United States
- State: Ohio
- Counties: Vinton

Highway system
- Ohio State Highway System; Interstate; US; State; Scenic
← SR 682	→ SR 684

State Route 683 (SR 683) is a north–south state highway in the southern portion of the U.S. state of Ohio. The southern terminus of State Route 683 is at a T-intersection with State Route 93 about 0.50 miles (0.80 km) north of Hamden. Its northern terminus is also at a T-intersection, this time with U.S. Route 50 nearly 6 miles (9.7 km) west of McArthur.

== Route description ==
State Route 683 is located entirely within Vinton County. This state highway is not included as a component of the National Highway System, a system of highways deemed most important for the nation's economy, mobility and defense.

== History ==
State Route 683 was designated in 1937. Its original routing is the same one within Vinton County that it utilizes to this day. There have been no significant changes to the routing of this highway since its inception. The only change to have taken place with respect to State Route 683 is the route that it meets at its southern terminus. What is now a part of State Route 93 was known as State Route 75 back in 1937.

== Major intersections ==
The entire route is in Vinton County.

Location	mi	km	Destinations	Notes
Clinton Township	0.00	0.00	SR 93 – McArthur, Wellston	
Richland Township	8.22	13.23	US 50 – McArthur, Chillicothe	
1.000 mi = 1.609 km; 1.000 km = 0.621 mi
