= Ohio State Route 356 =

State highway in southeastern Ohio, US

State Route 356

Route information
- Maintained by ODOT
- Length: 10.74 mi (17.28 km)
- Existed: 1934–present

Major junctions
- West end: US 50 in Knox Township
- East end: SR 56 in Waterloo Township

Location
- Country: United States
- State: Ohio
- Counties: Vinton, Athens

Highway system
- Ohio State Highway System; Interstate; US; State; Scenic
← SR 355	→ SR 357

State Route 356 (SR 356) is a 10.74-mile-long (17.28 km) state highway in southeastern Ohio. The route connects US 50 in the Knox Township, Vinton County community of Bolins Mills to SR 56 in Waterloo Township, Athens County.

== Route description ==
The route begins at an intersection with US 50 near the Raccoon Creek. It heads north through the Raccoon Creek valley occasionally acting as the border of the Zaleski State Forest. After approximately 3.3 miles (5.3 km), the creek and SR 356 diverge as the road heads north at the bottom of narrow valleys. Eventually, the route ascends out of the valleys and travels on a ridge as it exits Vinton County and enters Athens County. The route descends back into valleys, intersecting the northern terminus of SR 681 and passing through the community of Mineral. SR 356 winds through more valleys until ending at SR 56.

== History ==
The first segment of SR 356 brought into the state highway system was in 1932 as an unnumbered spur between SR 56 and the Waterloo State Forest, south of Mineral. By 1934, the route received its number of SR 356. The route was extended to its current length by 1937. No major changes have changed the routing since then.

== Major intersections ==
County	Location	mi	km	Destinations	Notes
Vinton	Knox Township	0.00	0.00	US 50	
Athens	Waterloo Township	7.48	12.04	SR 681 east / Rockcamp Road – Albany	Western terminus of SR 681
Athens	Waterloo Township	10.74	17.28	SR 56	
1.000 mi = 1.609 km; 1.000 km = 0.621 mi
