= Ohio State Route 294 =

State highway in northwestern Ohio, US

State Route 294

Route information
- Maintained by ODOT
- Length: 24.23 mi (38.99 km)
- Existed: 1932–present

Major junctions
- West end: SR 37 / CR 70 near Marseilles
- US 23 near Harpster
- East end: SR 98 / CR 19 near Bucyrus

Location
- Country: United States
- State: Ohio
- Counties: Wyandot, Crawford

Highway system
- Ohio State Highway System; Interstate; US; State; Scenic
← SR 293	→ SR 295

State Route 294 (SR 294) is a 24.23-mile (38.99 km) long east–west state highway in the northwestern quadrant of the U.S. state of Ohio. The route's western terminus is at SR 37 nearly 3.25 miles (5.23 km) northwest of the village of Marseilles. Its eastern terminus is at its junction with SR 98 about 4.75 miles (7.64 km) south of the city of Bucyrus.

== Route description ==
Along its way, SR 294 travels through the southern portion of Wyandot County and the southwestern part of Crawford County. There is no segment of SR 294 that is incorporated within the National Highway System (NHS). The NHS is a network of highways determined to be most important for the economy, mobility and defense of the nation.

== History ==
SR 294 was designated in 1932. When it was first designated, the highway was a short spur route that was routed along the portion of its present alignment that links U.S. Route 23 (US 23) with the village of Harpster. On April 15, 1937, SR 294 took on its present shape. On the west side, the highway was extended west from Harpster to its current western terminus at SR 37. Simultaneously, SR 294 was extended east of US 23 along its present alignment into Crawford County to a new eastern terminus at SR 98.

== Major intersections ==
County	Location	mi	km	Destinations	Notes
Wyandot	Jackson Township	0.00	0.00	SR 37 / CR 70 – Marseilles, Forest	
Wyandot	Mifflin Township	3.23	5.20	SR 67 – Marseilles, Upper Sandusky	
Wyandot	Pitt Township	11.63	18.72	US 23 – Marion, Upper Sandusky	
Wyandot	Antrim Township	15.91	25.60	SR 231 north / T-148 – Nevada	Western end of SR 231 concurrency
Wyandot	Antrim Township	17.62	28.36	SR 231 south – Morral	Eastern end of SR 231 concurrency
Crawford	Dallas Township	21.32	34.31	SR 4 – Marion, Bucyrus	
Crawford	Dallas Township	24.23	38.99	SR 98 / CR 19 (Monnett New Winchester Road)	
1.000 mi = 1.609 km; 1.000 km = 0.621 mi: Concurrency terminus
