= Carpenter, Ohio =

Unincorporated community in Ohio, U.S.

Coordinates: 39°09′46″N 82°13′10″W

Carpenter is an unincorporated community in Meigs County, Ohio, United States, along Leading Creek.

== History ==
A post office called Carpenter was established in 1883, and remained in operation until 1963. The community was named for one of three prominent Carpenter men who were natives of the area, Amos Carpenter, Sr., an old resident, or Jesse C. Carpenter, or State Senator J. L. Carpenter, who facilitated railroad access and a railroad station for the town.
