= Harrisonville, Ohio =

Unincorporated community in Ohio, U.S.

Coordinates: 39°07′35″N 82°08′02″W

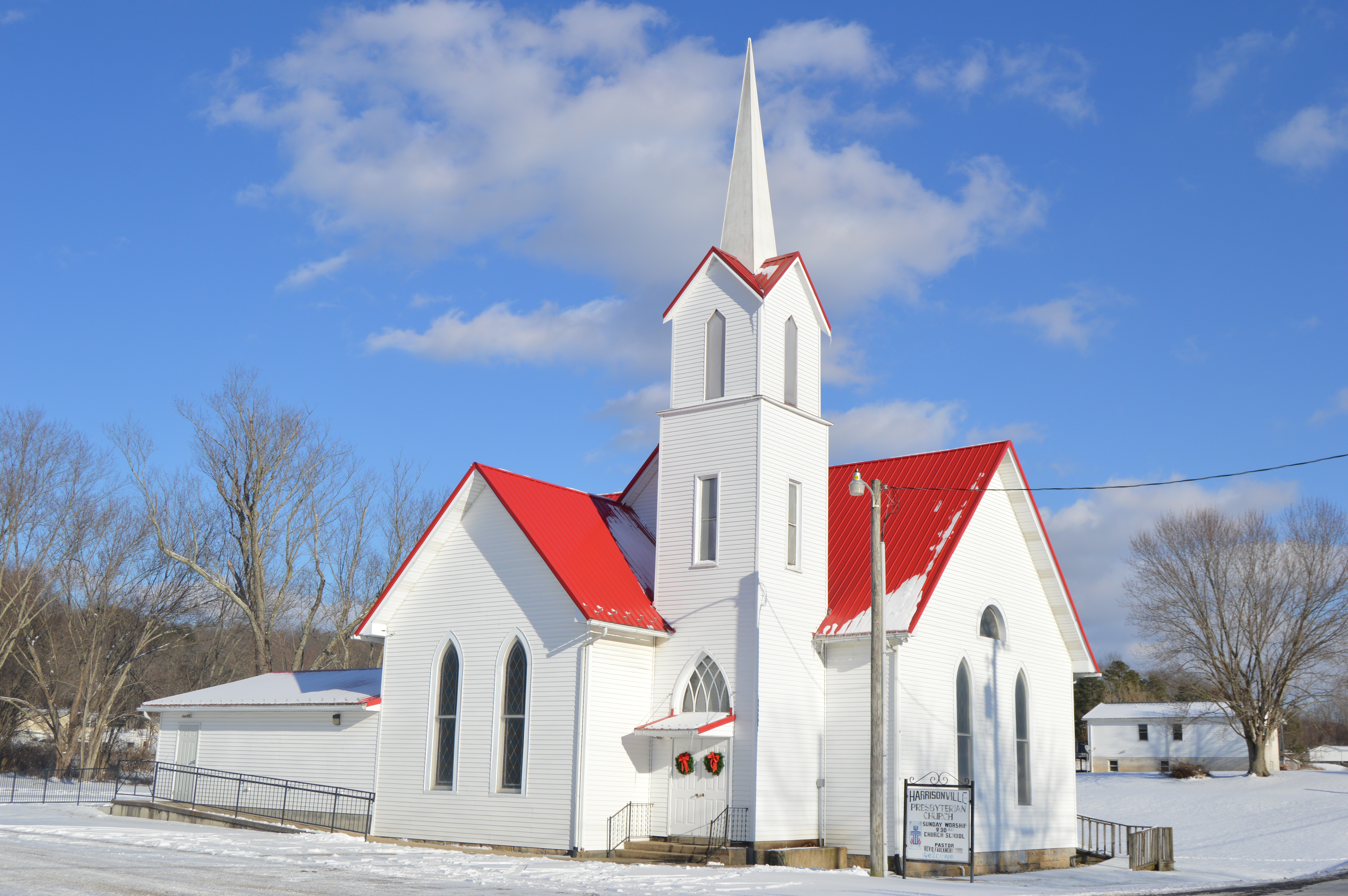
Presbyterian church on State Route 143

Harrisonville is an unincorporated community in Meigs County, in the U.S. state of Ohio.

== History ==
Harrisonville was founded in 1840, and named for William Henry Harrison, the winning candidate in the 1840 United States presidential election. A post office was established at Harrisonville in 1841, and remained in operation until 1964.
