= Ohio State Route 681 =

State highway in southern Ohio, US

State Route 681

Route information
- Maintained by ODOT
- Length: 39.43 mi (63.46 km)
- Existed: 1962–present

Major junctions
- West end: SR 356 near Albany
- US 50 / SR 32 in Albany; US 33 in Darwin; SR 7 in Tuppers Plains
- East end: SR 124 in Reedsville

Location
- Country: United States
- State: Ohio
- Counties: Athens, Meigs

Highway system
- Ohio State Highway System; Interstate; US; State; Scenic
← SR 680	→ SR 682

State Route 681 (SR 681) is a 39.53-mile (63.62 km) long east–west state highway in the southern portion of the U.S. state of Ohio. The western terminus of SR 681 is at a T-intersection with SR 356 approximately 6.75 miles (10.86 km) northwest of Albany. Its eastern terminus is also at a T-intersection, this time with SR 124 nearly 9.50 miles (15.29 km) southeast of Coolville.

== Route description ==
SR 681 traverses southwestern Athens County and northern Meigs County. There are no portions of SR 681 that are included within the National Highway System (NHS). The NHS is a network of highways identified as being most important for the economy, mobility and defense of the country.

== History ==
The SR 681 designation was applied in 1962. Maintaining the same routing through Athens and Meigs Counties throughout its history, SR 681 replaced what was known as SR 680 prior to 1962. This was done to coincide with the coming of the Interstate Highway System to Ohio, which included Interstate 680 (I-680) in the Youngstown area. Ohio follows a standard that no numerical designation may be duplicated among Interstate, U.S. and Ohio state routes, so to avoid a conflict, SR 680 was re-numbered as SR 681.

== Major intersections ==
County	Location	mi	km	Destinations	Notes
Athens	Waterloo Township	0.00	0.00	SR 356	
Athens	Albany	7.15	11.51	US 50 / SR 32 – Athens, McArthur, Wellston	Interchange
Meigs	Scipio Township	12.53	20.17	SR 684 south – Pageville	Northern terminus of SR 684
Meigs	Bedford Township	19.95	32.11	US 33 – Athens, Pomeroy	Interchange
Meigs	Orange Township	31.65	50.94	SR 7 – Pomeroy, Marietta	
Meigs	Olive Township	39.43	63.46	SR 124 – Little Hocking, Pomeroy	
1.000 mi = 1.609 km; 1.000 km = 0.621 mi
