= Darwin, Ohio =

Unincorporated community in Ohio, U.S.

Coordinates: 39°08′46″N 82°01′25″W

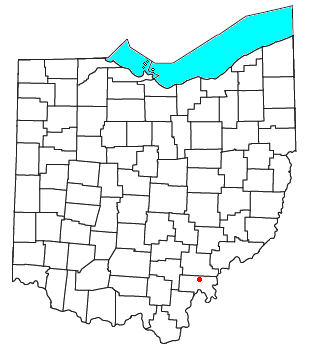
Location of Darwin, Ohio

Darwin is a small unincorporated community in central Bedford Township, Meigs County, Ohio, in the United States. It is located along U.S. Route 33 between Athens and Pomeroy, at its intersection with State Route 681.

== Education ==
Public education in the community of Darwin is provided by the Meigs Local School District. Campuses serving the community include Meigs Primary School (Grades K-2), Meigs Intermediate School (Grades 3-5), Meigs Middle School (Grades 6-8), and Meigs High School (Grades 9-12).
