= Ohio State Route 143 =

State highway in southern Ohio, US

State Route 143

Route information
- Maintained by ODOT
- Length: 20.15 mi (32.43 km)
- Existed: 1923–present

Major junctions
- South end: SR 7 near Pomeroy
- North end: US 50 near Albany

Location
- Country: United States
- State: Ohio
- Counties: Meigs, Athens

Highway system
- Ohio State Highway System; Interstate; US; State; Scenic
← SR 142	→ SR 144

State Route 143 (SR 143) is a north–south state highway in the southern portion of the U.S. state of Ohio. It is also home to the famous 143 yard sale, a 20 mile long annual event where anyone on the route is open to host a yard sale. The southern terminus of SR 143 is at a T-intersection with the concurrency of SR 7 and SR 124 approximately one mile (1.6 km) west of the village of Pomeroy. Its northern terminus is at a T-intersection with U.S. Route 50 (US 50) nearly 2.75 miles (4.43 km) southwest of Albany.

== Route description ==
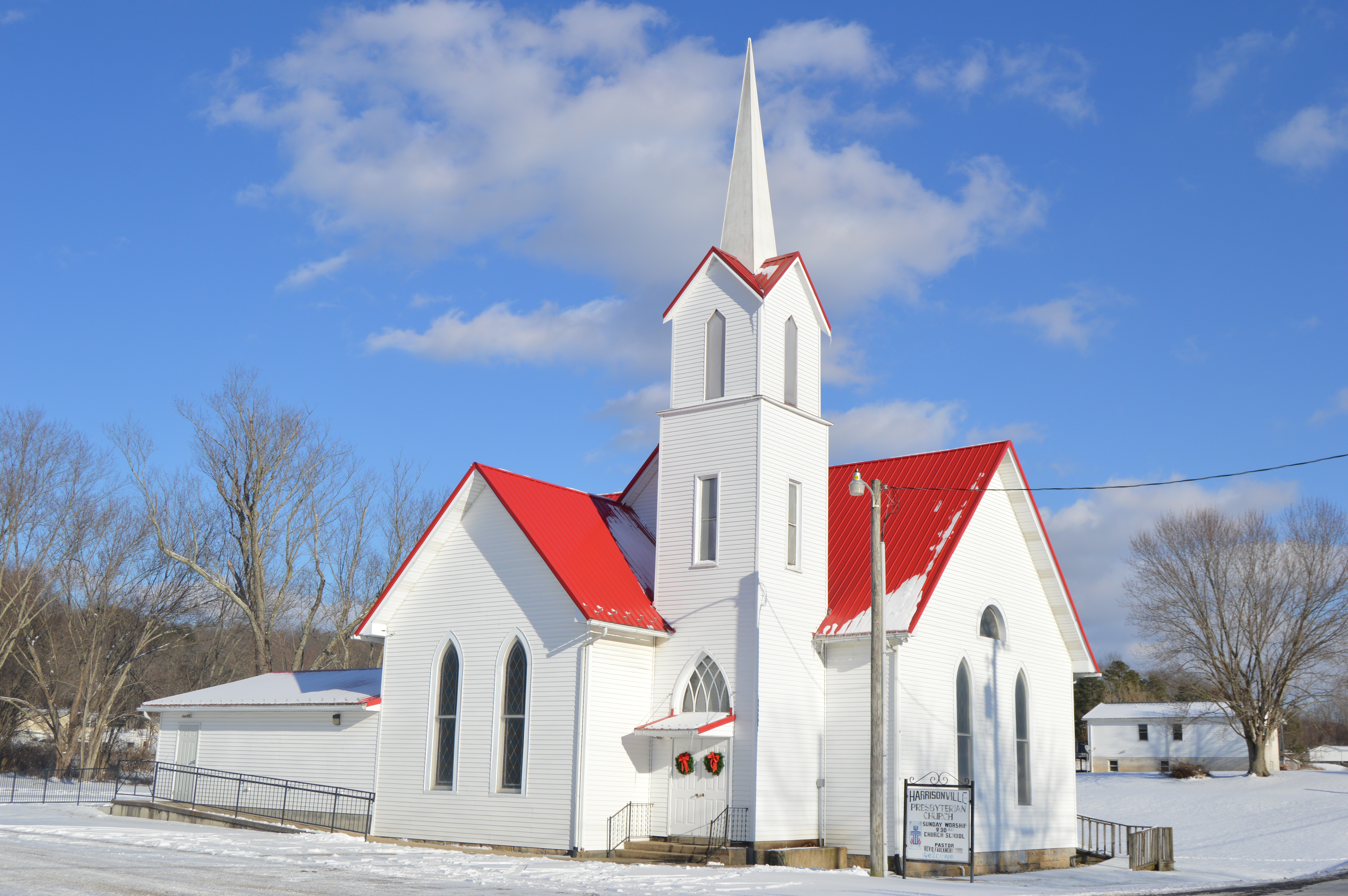
Presbyterian church at Harrisonville

Along its way, SR 143 passes through the western half of Meigs County and ducks into the extreme southwestern portion of Athens County. There is no portion of this state highway that is included within the National Highway System, a network of routes deemed most important for the country's economy, mobility and defense.

== History ==
The designation of SR 143 took place in 1923. Originally, this highway started in downtown Middleport at the intersection of 2nd Avenue, the former routing of SR 7, and Mill Street. It followed Mill Street to the northwest, which becomes known as Bradbury Road once it leaves the village. SR 143 continued on Bradbury Road to its intersection with SR 124, then turned east onto the current alignment of SR 124. It proceeded east to the SR 7 intersection, then turned north onto what is presently SR 7 and SR 124 to the current southern terminus of SR 143. It then followed the entirety of its current alignment, coming to an end at the predecessor to US 50, SR 26.

By 1969, in conjunction with the completion of a new SR 7 bypass of Middleport and Pomeroy, the SR 143 designation was removed from the portions located to the south of its current southern terminus, thus resulting in the highway taking on the shape it has today. Jurisdiction of the portion of SR 143 along Mill Street in Middleport was turned over to the county, while control of the Bradbury Road section was transferred to Meigs County. The east–west concurrent segment with SR 124 became just SR 124, while the north–south concurrent stretch with SR 124 turned into a concurrency of SR 7 and SR 124.

== Major intersections ==
County	Location	mi	km	Destinations	Notes
Meigs	Salisbury Township	0.00	0.00	SR 7 / SR 124 – Pomeroy, Gallipolis	
Meigs	Scipio Township	8.25	13.28	SR 684 north / CR 3 (New Lima Road) – Pageville	Southern terminus of SR 684
Athens	Lee Township	19.58	31.51	SR 32 (James A. Rhodes Appalachian Highway) – Wellston, Athens	
Athens	Lee Township	20.15	32.43	US 50 – McArthur, Athens	
1.000 mi = 1.609 km; 1.000 km = 0.621 mi
