= Wharton, Ohio =

- Village
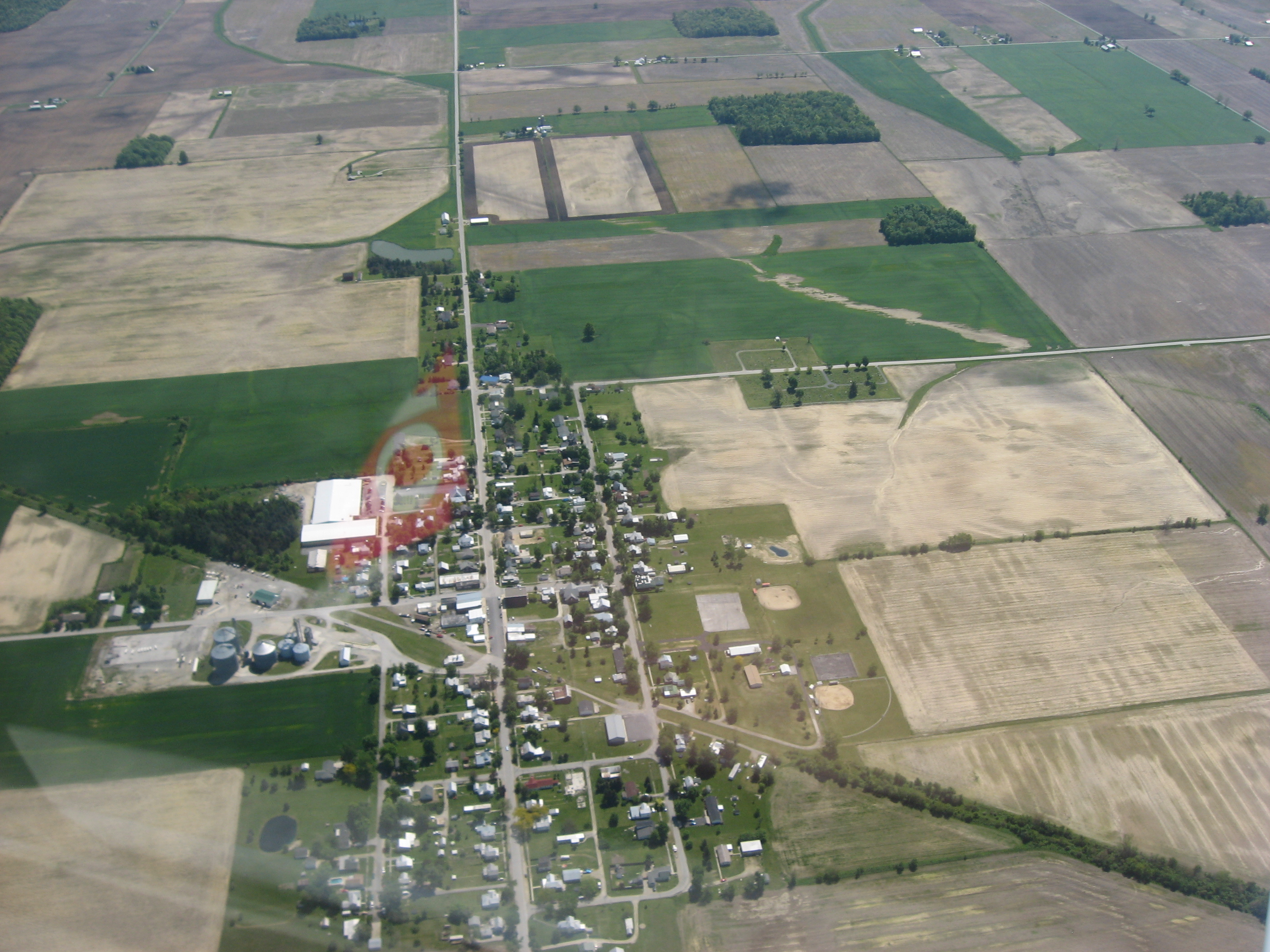
- Aerial view of Wharton

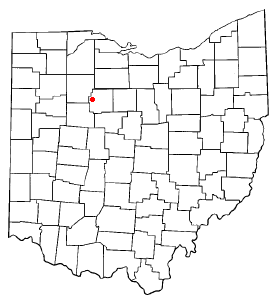
- Location of Wharton, Ohio

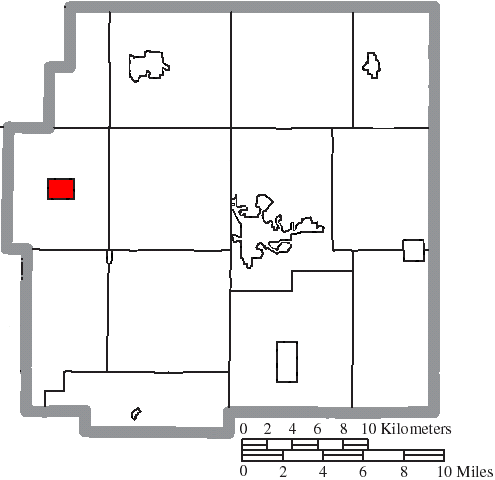
- Location of Wharton in Wyandot County
- Coordinates: 40°51′41″N 83°27′53″W
- Country: United States
- State: Ohio
- County: Wyandot
- Township: Richland

Area
  - Total: 1.25 sq mi (3.25 km^{2})
  - Land: 1.25 sq mi (3.25 km^{2})
  - Water: 0 sq mi (0.00 km^{2})
- Elevation: 876 ft (267 m)

Population (2020)
  - Total: 328
  - Density: 261.0/sq mi (100.78/km^{2})
- Time zone: UTC-5 (Eastern (EST))
  - Summer (DST): UTC-4 (EDT)
- ZIP code: 43359
- Area code: 419
- FIPS code: 39-84574
- GNIS feature ID: 2400159

Wharton is a village in Wyandot County, Ohio, United States. The population was 328 at the 2020 census.

== History ==
Wharton was originally called Whartonsburg, and under the latter name was laid out in 1848. The village was named in honor of an early settler. A post office was established as Whartonsburgh in 1852, and the name was changed to Wharton in 1879.

== Geography ==
According to the United States Census Bureau, the village has a total area of 1.26 square miles (3.26 km^{2}), all land.

== Demographics ==
Historical population
Census	Pop.	Note	%±
1880	399		—
1900	439		—
1910	485		10.5%
1920	361		−25.6%
1930	409		13.3%
1940	407		−0.5%
1950	392		−3.7%
1960	463		18.1%
1970	422		−8.9%
1980	432		2.4%
1990	378		−12.5%
2000	409		8.2%
2010	358		−12.5%
2020	328		−8.4%
U.S. Decennial Census

=== 2010 census ===
As of the census of 2010, there were 358 people, 133 households, and 101 families living in the village. The population density was 284.1 inhabitants per square mile (109.7/km^{2}). There were 155 housing units at an average density of 123.0 per square mile (47.5/km^{2}). The racial makeup of the village was 99.2% White and 0.8% from two or more races. Hispanic or Latino of any race were 0.8% of the population.

There were 133 households, of which 42.1% had children under the age of 18 living with them, 56.4% were married couples living together, 10.5% had a female householder with no husband present, 9.0% had a male householder with no wife present, and 24.1% were non-families. 18.8% of all households were made up of individuals, and 5.3% had someone living alone who was 65 years of age or older. The average household size was 2.69 and the average family size was 3.00.

The median age in the village was 36.4 years. 26% of residents were under the age of 18; 7.9% were between the ages of 18 and 24; 29.3% were from 25 to 44; 24.3% were from 45 to 64; and 12.3% were 65 years of age or older. The gender makeup of the village was 51.4% male and 48.6% female.

=== 2000 census ===
As of the census of 2000, there were 409 people, 145 households, and 114 families living in the village. The population density was 325.3 inhabitants per square mile (125.6/km^{2}). There were 153 housing units at an average density of 121.7 per square mile (47.0/km^{2}). The racial makeup of the village was 99.51% White, 0.24% Native American and 0.24% Asian. Hispanic or Latino of any race were 0.24% of the population.

There were 145 households, out of which 42.1% had children under the age of 18 living with them, 65.5% were married couples living together, 9.7% had a female householder with no husband present, and 20.7% were non-families. 19.3% of all households were made up of individuals, and 7.6% had someone living alone who was 65 years of age or older. The average household size was 2.82 and the average family size was 3.16.

In the village, the population was spread out, with 31.3% under the age of 18, 7.3% from 18 to 24, 30.8% from 25 to 44, 17.1% from 45 to 64, and 13.4% who were 65 years of age or older. The median age was 33 years. For every 100 females there were 96.6 males. For every 100 females age 18 and over, there were 97.9 males.

The median income for a household in the village was $38,000, and the median income for a family was $40,833. Males had a median income of $31,389 versus $22,813 for females. The per capita income for the village was $14,645. About 0.9% of families and 2.6% of the population were below the poverty line, including 3.4% of those under age 18 and none of those age 65 or over.
