= Leading Creek (Ohio) =

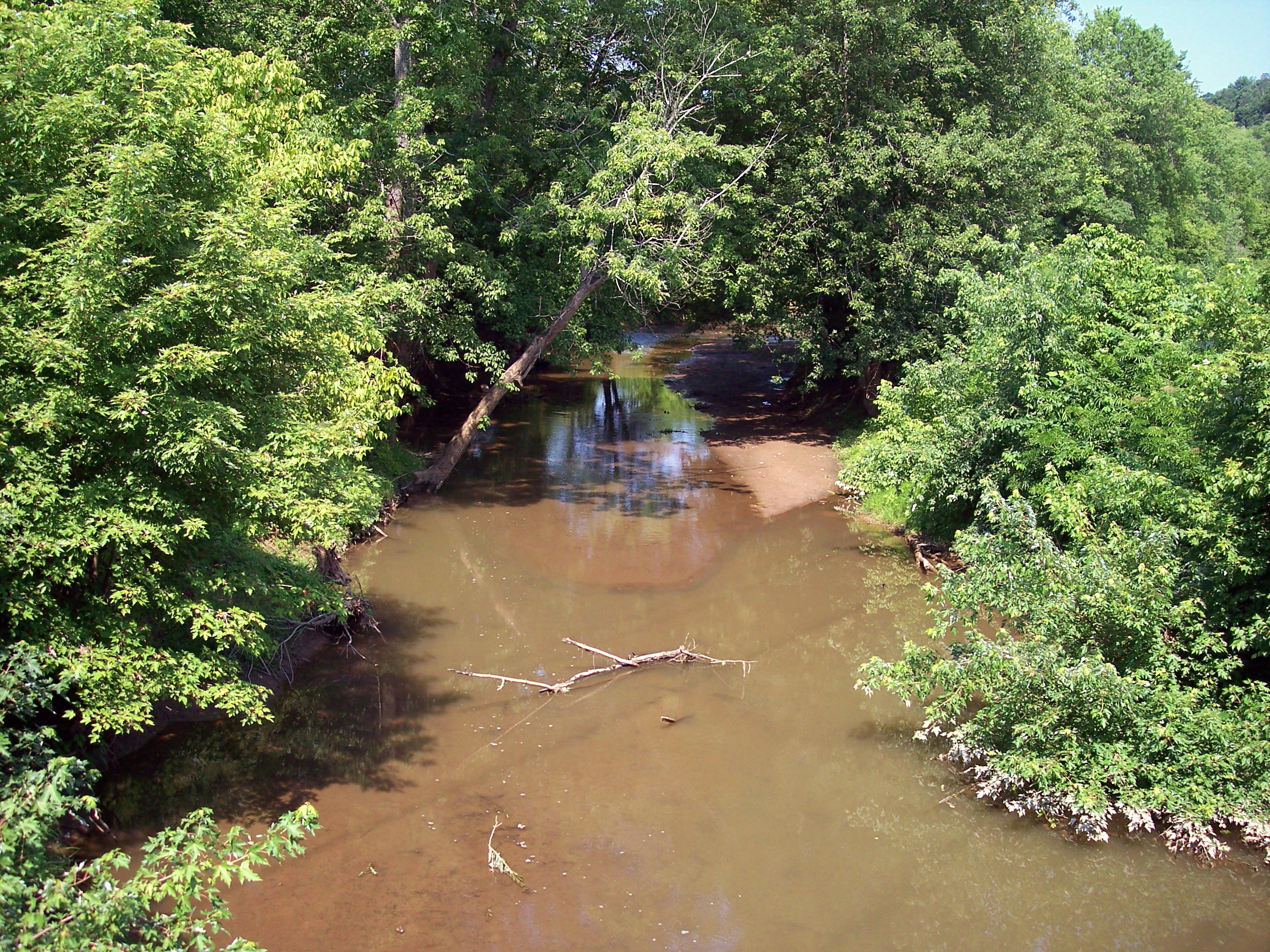
- Leading Creek in Rutland Township in 2007

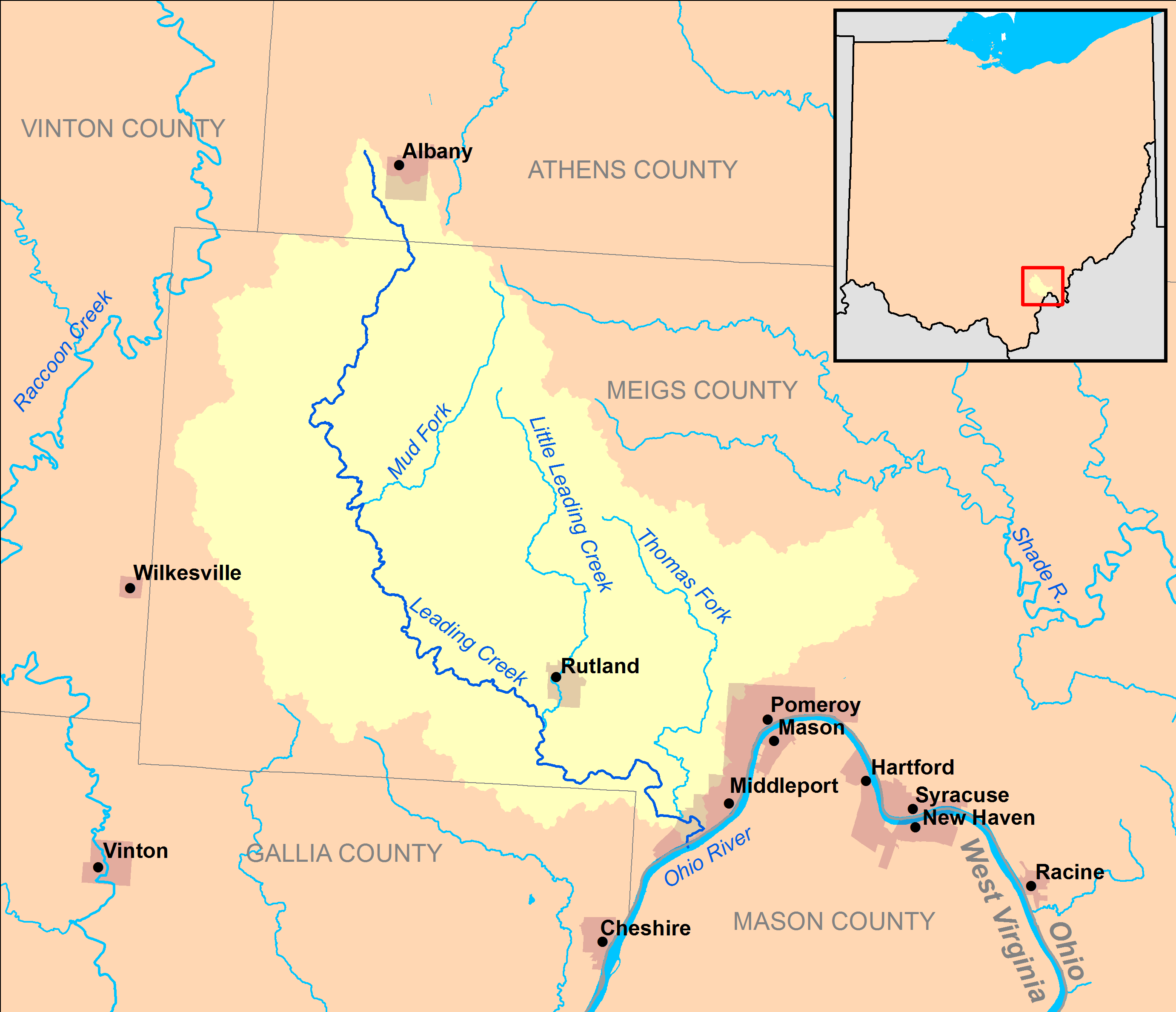
- Map of Leading Creek and its watershed

Location
- Country: United States
- State: Ohio
- Counties: Athens, Meigs

Physical characteristics
- Source
  - location: Lee Township, Athens County
  - coordinates: 39.2359064°N 82.2190367°W
  - elevation: 820 ft (250 m)
- Mouth: Ohio River
  - location: Middleport
  - coordinates: 38.9845230°N 82.0715312°W
  - elevation: 538 ft (164 m)
- Length: 29.5 mi (47.5 km)
- Basin size: 150 sq mi (390 km^{2})

Basin features
- Tributaries
  - left: Little Leading Creek

Leading Creek is a tributary of the Ohio River, 29.5 miles (47.5 km) long, in southeastern Ohio in the United States. Via the Ohio River, it is part of the watershed of the Mississippi River, draining an area of 150 square miles (390 km^{2}) on the unglaciated portion of the Allegheny Plateau. The creek's headwaters are in southern Athens County and it flows for most of its length in western Meigs County; its tributaries also drain a small area of northeastern Gallia County.

Leading Creek rises northwest of Albany in Lee Township in Athens County and initially flows southward into Meigs County, through Columbia Township, past the community of Carpenter; then southeastward through Salem, Rutland, and Salisbury townships, through the community of Langsville. It flows into the Ohio River at the south end of the village of Middleport.

== Little Leading Creek ==
Little Leading Creek is a tributary of Leading Creek and flows for its entire length in Meigs County. It rises at 39°08′54″N 82°09′16″W in Scipio Township and flows southward through the village of Rutland to 39°01′32″N 82°08′15″W in Rutland Township. It is 10.6 miles (17.1 km) long and drains an area of 25.6 square miles (66 km^{2}).

== See also ==
- List of rivers of Ohio
