= Meigs Local School District =

School district in Ohio

Coordinates: 39°2′N 82°4′W

Location
- Pomeroy, Ohio; United States

District information
- Type: Public School District
- Motto: "Where Excellence Begins"
- Established: 1965
- Superintendent: Scot Sheen

Students and staff
- District mascot: Marauders
- Colors: Maroon & Gold

Other information
- Website: www.meigslocal.org

The Meigs Local School District is a public school district based in Pomeroy, Ohio, United States.

The school district includes all of Rutland, Salem, Salisbury, Scipio as well as most of Bedford Township, and a very small portion of Chester Township.

Three incorporated villages are served by Meigs Local Schools: Pomeroy, Middleport, and Rutland. Notable unincorporated communities in the district include Darwin and Langsville.

== History ==
Meigs Local School District was formed through the consolidation of three smaller school districts: Rutland-Northwestern Local, Middleport Exempted Village and Pomeroy Exempted Village school districts in 1965. In 1970, students from the three high schools that represented the former school districts (Rutland, Middleport and Pomeroy) consolidated and were enrolled at the District's new high school, which was built along Pomeroy Pike. Meigs Local then began control over the seven remaining school buildings that were governed by the three former Districts: Bradbury Elementary (built 1925), Harrisonville Elementary (built 1930), Meigs Junior High (built 1936), Middleport Elementary (built 1957), Pomeroy Elementary (built 1961), Rutland Elementary (built 1935), Salem Center Elementary (built c. 1945), and Salisbury Elementary (built c. 1952).

In 1999, the Board of Education approved a school bond measure that would allow for the construction of a new elementary school divided into two wings - a primary school and an intermediate school, a new middle school and renovations to the existing high school. In 2002, renovations to Meigs High School were complete and in 2003, Meigs Elementary and Meigs Middle School opened, which consolidated the seven preexisting elementary buildings and junior high school.

After closure of the District's former schools, Bradbury, Middleport and Pomeroy elementary schools began serving the communities in other capacities. Salisbury Elementary was renovated and converted to serve as the District's administrative office building. Harrisonville Elementary and Meigs Junior High were sold. Lastly, both Rutland and Salem Center Elementary schools were abated and demolished.

== Schools ==
- Meigs High School (Grades 9-12)
- Meigs Middle School (Grades 6-8)
- Meigs Intermediate School (Grades 3-5)
- Meigs Primary School (Grades K-2)

== See also ==
- List of school districts in Ohio
