= Langsville, Ohio =

Unincorporated community in Meigs County, Ohio, United States

Coordinates: 39°02′49″N 82°10′54″W

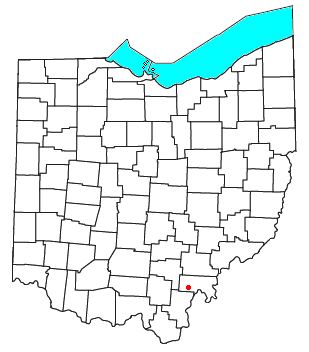
Location of Langsville, Ohio

Langsville is an unincorporated community in western Rutland Township, Meigs County, Ohio, United States, along Leading Creek. Although it is unincorporated, it has the ZIP code 45741.

== Education ==
Public education in the community of Langsville is provided by the Meigs Local School District. Campuses serving the community include Meigs Primary School (Grades K-2), Meigs Intermediate School (Grades 3-5), Meigs Middle School (Grades 6-8), and Meigs High School (Grades 9-12).
