= Rutland, Ohio =

- Village
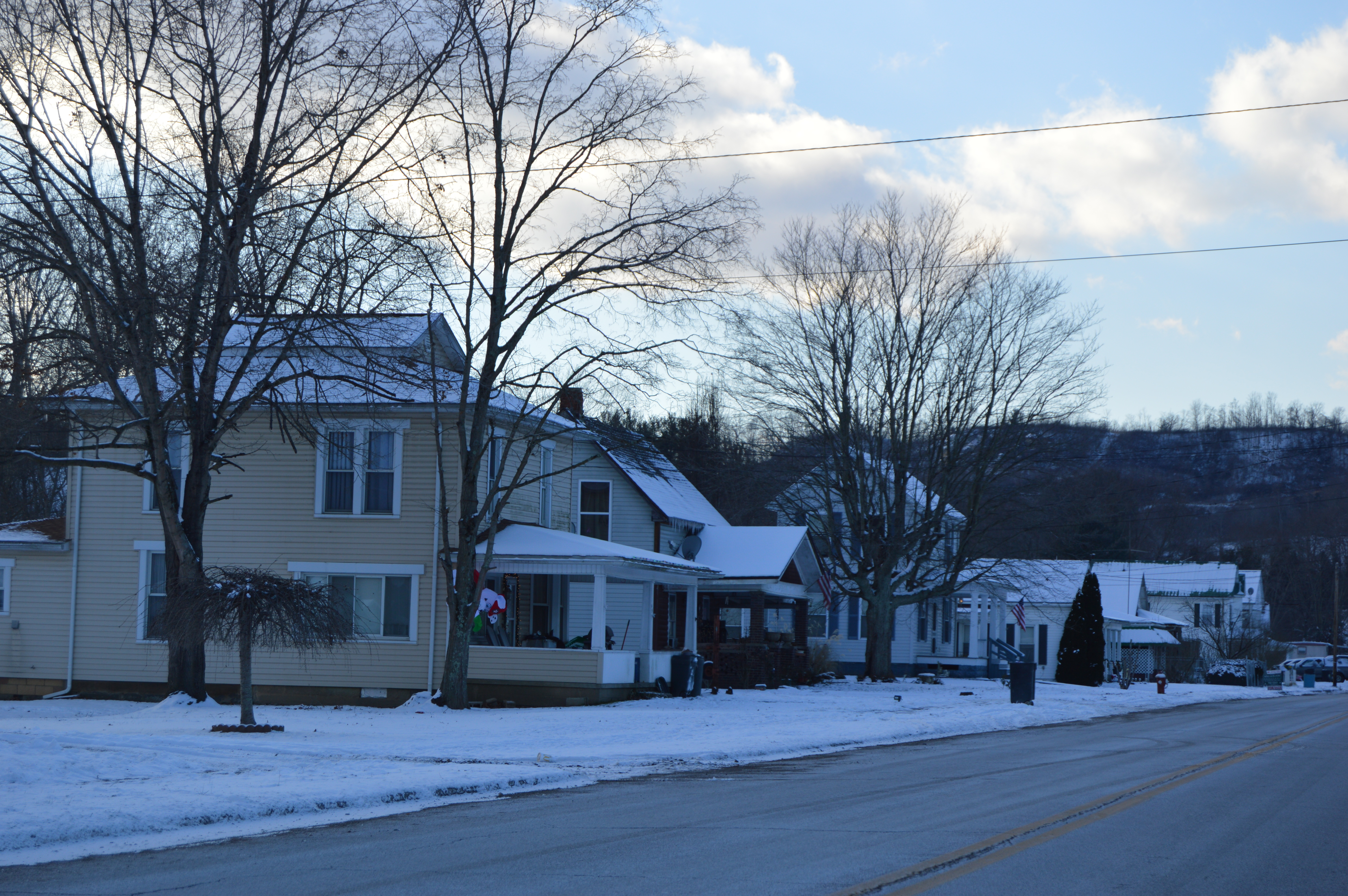
- Salem Street

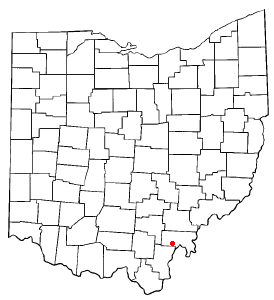
- Location of Rutland, Ohio

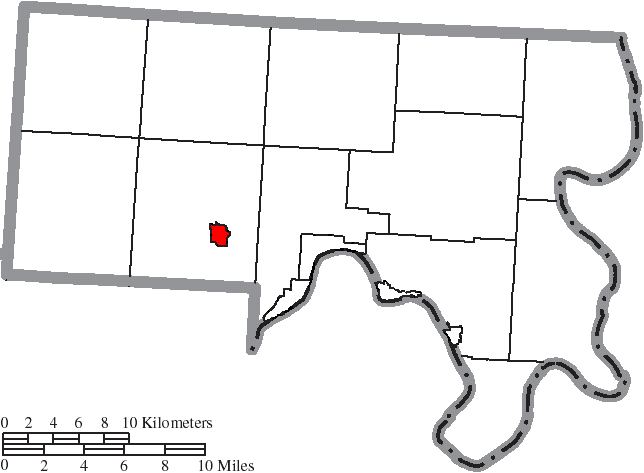
- Location of Rutland in Meigs County
- Coordinates: 39°02′26″N 82°07′32″W
- Country: United States
- State: Ohio
- County: Meigs
- Township: Rutland
- Incorporated: 1913

Government
  - Type: Mayor council government

Area
  - Total: 0.87 sq mi (2.26 km^{2})
  - Land: 0.87 sq mi (2.26 km^{2})
  - Water: 0 sq mi (0.00 km^{2})
- Elevation: 591 ft (180 m)

Population (2020)
  - Total: 427
  - Density: 488.3/sq mi (188.55/km^{2})
- Time zone: UTC-5 (Eastern (EST))
  - Summer (DST): UTC-4 (EDT)
- ZIP code: 45775
- Area code: 740
- FIPS code: 39-69358
- GNIS feature ID: 2399150
- Website: www.villageofrutland.org

Rutland is a village in Meigs County, Ohio, United States. The population was 427 at the 2020 census.

== Geography ==
The village lies in the Appalachian Plateau physiographic region. It is situated in a wide valley along Little Leading Creek.

The surrounding hills, once containing profitable amounts of bituminous coal, have been subjected to strip mining throughout the early and mid 1900s. Currently, there are no mining operations in the area. Acid mine drainage has been found seeping out some of the abandoned mines and has negatively impacted water quality in the Little Leading Creek watershed.

According to the United States Census Bureau, the village has a total area of 0.83 square miles (2.15 km^{2}), all land.

== Demographics ==
Historical population
Census	Pop.	Note	%±
1880	139		—
1920	500		—
1930	570		14.0%
1940	562		−1.4%
1950	554		−1.4%
1960	687		24.0%
1970	663		−3.5%
1980	635		−4.2%
1990	469		−26.1%
2000	401		−14.5%
2010	393		−2.0%
2020	427		8.7%
U.S. Decennial Census

=== 2010 census ===
As of the census of 2010, there were 393 people, 161 households, and 115 families living in the village. The population density was 473.5 inhabitants per square mile (182.8/km^{2}). There were 189 housing units at an average density of 227.7 units per square mile (87.9 units/km^{2}). The racial makeup of the village was 98.7% White, 0.3% from other races, and 1.0% from two or more races. Hispanic or Latino of any race were 1.0% of the population.

There were 161 households, of which 34.8% had children under the age of 18 living with them, 52.2% were married couples living together, 11.2% had a female householder with no husband present, 8.1% had a male householder with no wife present, and 28.6% were non-families. 26.1% of all households were made up of individuals, and 9.4% had someone living alone who was 65 years of age or older. The average household size was 2.44 and the average family size was 2.85.

The median age in the village was 39.3 years. 23.4% of residents were under the age of 18; 8.2% were between the ages of 18 and 24; 26.1% were from 25 to 44; 25.5% were from 45 to 64; and 17% were 65 years of age or older. The gender makeup of the village was 48.9% male and 51.1% female.

=== 2000 census ===
As of the census of 2000, there were 401 people, 163 households, and 109 families living in the village. The population density was 488.3 inhabitants per square mile (188.5/km^{2}). There were 175 housing units at an average density of 213.1 units per square mile (82.3 units/km^{2}). The racial makeup of the village was 99.50% White, and 0.50% from two or more races. Hispanic or Latino of any race were 0.25% of the population.

There were 163 households, out of which 30.7% had children under the age of 18 living with them, 53.4% were married couples living together, 10.4% had a female householder with no husband present, and 33.1% were non-families. 30.7% of all households were made up of individuals, and 17.2% had someone living alone who was 65 years of age or older. The average household size was 2.46 and the average family size was 3.05.

In the village, the population was spread out, with 24.7% under the age of 18, 9.7% from 18 to 24, 26.4% from 25 to 44, 21.9% from 45 to 64, and 17.2% who were 65 years of age or older. The median age was 37 years. For every 100 females there were 85.6 males. For every 100 females age 18 and over, there were 78.7 males.

The median income for a household in the village was $27,500, and the median income for a family was $32,917. Males had a median income of $30,500 versus $11,375 for females. The per capita income for the village was $13,558. About 10.3% of families and 11.9% of the population were below the poverty line, including 10.8% of those under age 18 and 14.1% of those age 65 or over.

== Education ==
Public education in the village of Rutland is provided by the Meigs Local School District. Campuses serving the village include Meigs Primary School (Grades K-2), Meigs Intermediate School (Grades 3–5), Meigs Middle School (Grades 6–8), and Meigs High School (Grades 9–12). More importantly, Rutland High School was the home of the Rutland Red Devils prior to consolidation. The football team was known as the "Yanks of Football".

== Government ==
Citizens in the village of Rutland quadrennially elect a mayor and a six-member Village Council, with staggered terms. The Mayor serves as the chief executive officer of the municipality, oversees its daily operations and services and enforces the by-laws and ordinances of the municipality. In addition, the Mayor presides over meetings of the Village Council as well as Mayor's Court.

The Village Council acts as the legislative authority of the municipality and is responsible for considering for approval the annual municipal budget, the appointment and removal of village officers and employees and contractual agreements; conducts oversight on the expenditure of public funds and passes legislation, such as ordinances and resolutions.

== Notable people ==
- Brewster Higley VI, composer of "Home on the Range"
- William P. Halliday, businessman and railroad executive
