= Columbia Township, Ohio =

Columbia Township, Ohio, may refer to:

- Columbia Township, Hamilton County, Ohio
- Columbia Township, Lorain County, Ohio
- Columbia Township, Meigs County, Ohio
