= Madison Township, Vinton County, Ohio =

Township in Ohio, US

- Township
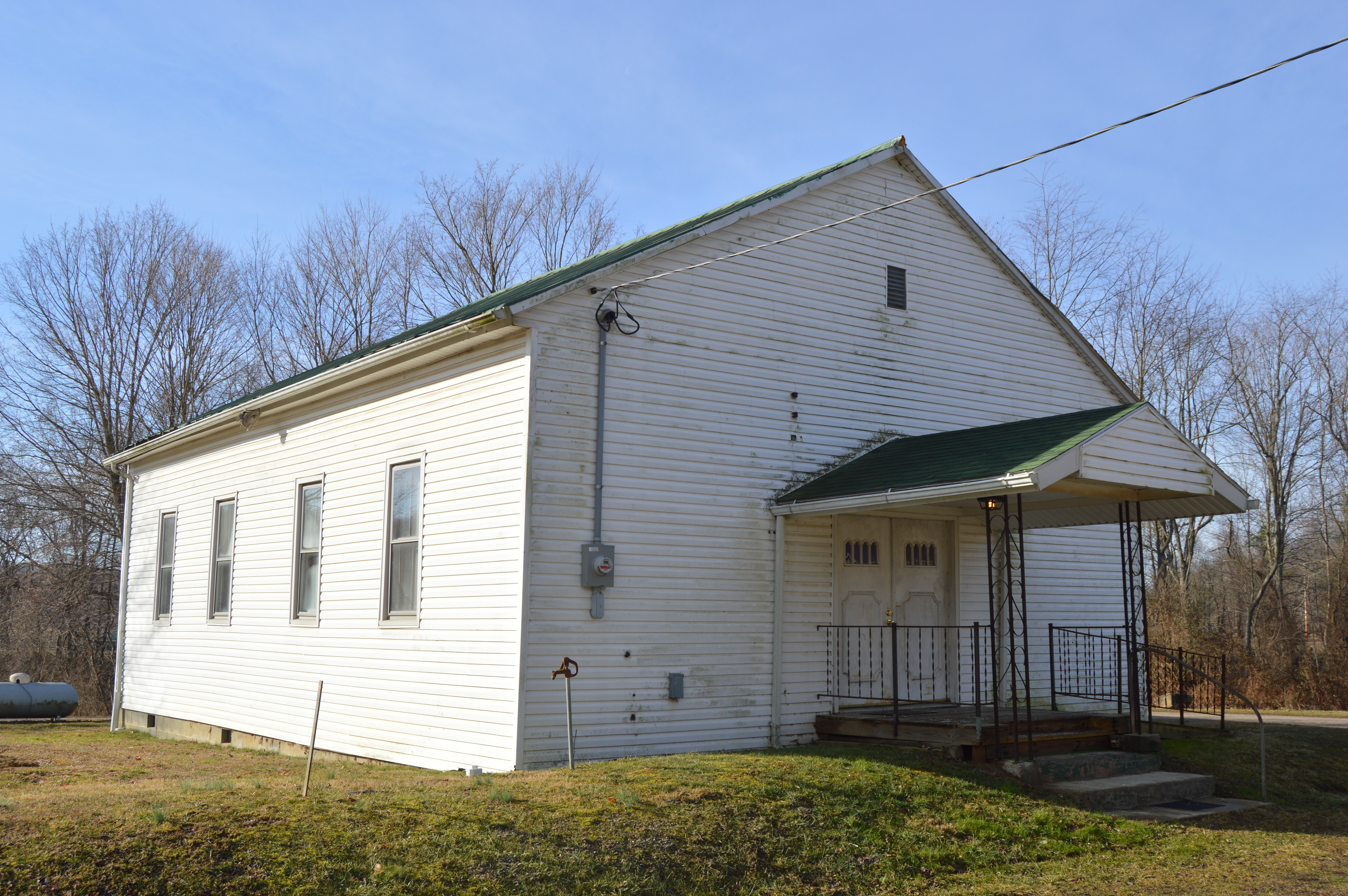
- Old schoolhouse in Prattsville

- Location in Vinton County and the state of Ohio.
- Coordinates: 39°16′3″N 82°23′28″W
- Country: United States
- State: Ohio
- County: Vinton

Area
  - Total: 24.5 sq mi (63.5 km^{2})
  - Land: 24.5 sq mi (63.5 km^{2})
  - Water: 0 sq mi (0.0 km^{2})
- Elevation: 801 ft (244 m)

Population (2020)
  - Total: 532
  - Density: 21.7/sq mi (8.38/km^{2})
- Time zone: UTC-5 (Eastern (EST))
  - Summer (DST): UTC-4 (EDT)
- FIPS code: 39-46620
- GNIS feature ID: 1087106

Madison Township is one of the twelve townships of Vinton County, Ohio, United States. The 2020 census found 532 people in the township, 230 of whom lived in the village of Zaleski.

== Geography ==
Located in the center of the county, it borders the following townships:

- Brown Township: north
- Knox Township: east
- Vinton Township: south
- Clinton Township: southwest corner
- Elk Township: west
- Swan Township: northwest corner

It is one of only two county townships without a border on another county.

Zaleski, the second-smallest village in Vinton County, is located in northwestern Madison Township.

Prattsville is an unincorporated community in Madison Township, Vinton County, Ohio. It is located about 5 miles east of the county seat McArthur at the intersection of US 50 and State Route 278.

== Name and history ==
It is one of twenty Madison Townships statewide.

== Government ==
The township is governed by a three-member board of trustees, who are elected in November of odd-numbered years to a four-year term beginning on the following January 1. Two are elected in the year after the presidential election and one is elected in the year before it. There is also an elected township fiscal officer, who serves a four-year term beginning on April 1 of the year after the election, which is held in November of the year before the presidential election. Vacancies in the fiscal officership or on the board of trustees are filled by the remaining trustees.
