= Knox Township, Vinton County, Ohio =

Township in Ohio, US

- Township
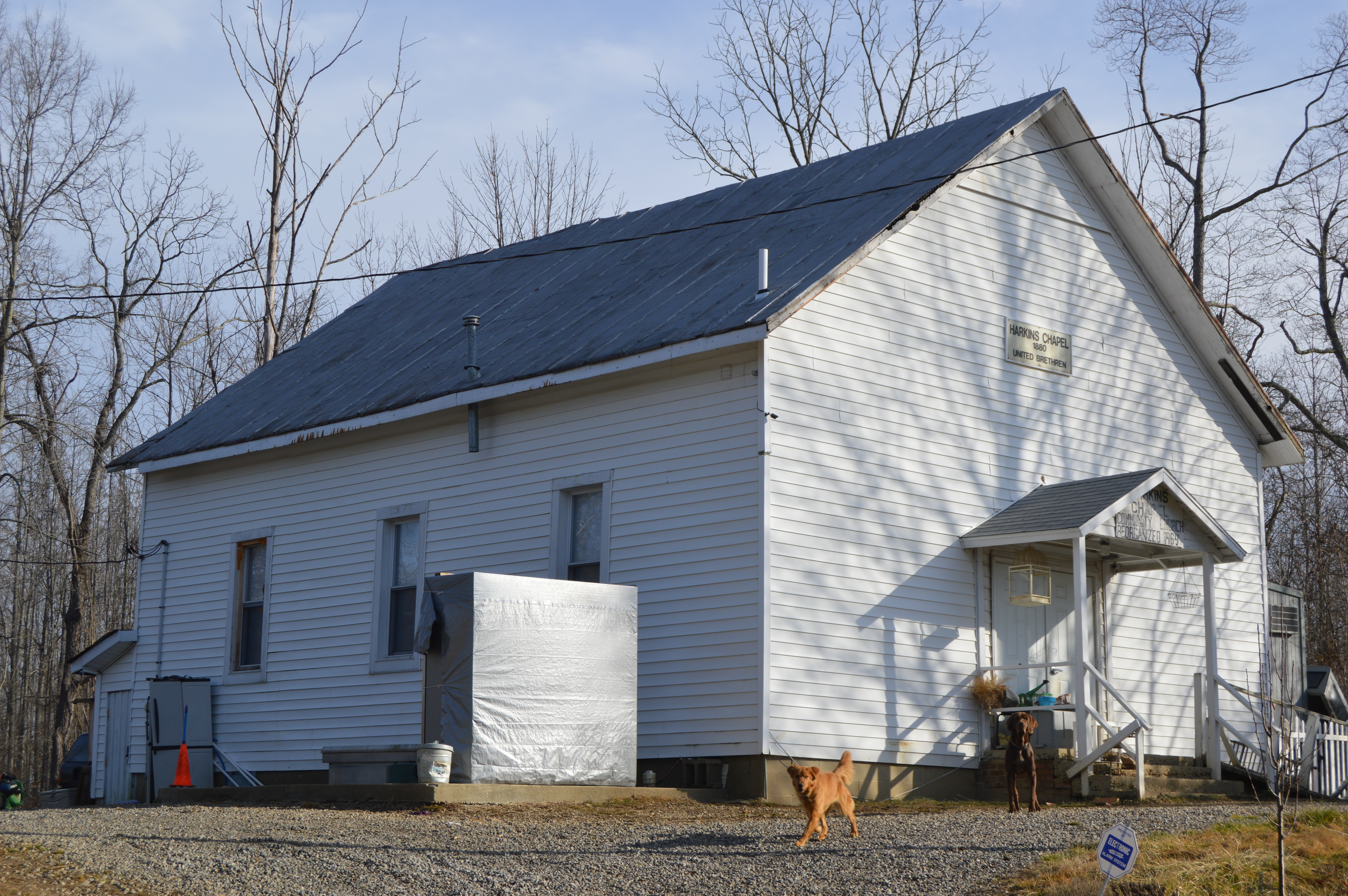
- Harkins Chapel

- Location in Vinton County and the state of Ohio.
- Coordinates: 39°14′49″N 82°18′2″W
- Country: United States
- State: Ohio
- County: Vinton

Area
  - Total: 25.1 sq mi (64.9 km^{2})
  - Land: 25.1 sq mi (64.9 km^{2})
  - Water: 0 sq mi (0.0 km^{2})
- Elevation: 804 ft (245 m)

Population (2020)
  - Total: 541
  - Density: 21.6/sq mi (8.34/km^{2})
- Time zone: UTC-5 (Eastern (EST))
  - Summer (DST): UTC-4 (EDT)
- FIPS code: 39-40880
- GNIS feature ID: 1087105

Knox Township is one of the twelve townships of Vinton County, Ohio, United States. The 2020 census found 541 people in the township.

== Geography ==
Located in the far eastern part of the county, it borders the following townships:

- Waterloo Township, Athens County: northeast
- Lee Township, Athens County: east
- Columbiana Township, Meigs County: southeast
- Vinton Township: southwest
- Madison Township: west
- Brown Township: northwest

No municipalities are located in Knox Township.

== Name and history ==
Knox Township was organized in 1850. It was named for General Henry Knox.

It is one of five Knox Townships statewide.

== Government ==
The township is governed by a three-member board of trustees, who are elected in November of odd-numbered years to a four-year term beginning on the following January 1. Two are elected in the year after the presidential election and one is elected in the year before it. There is also an elected township fiscal officer, who serves a four-year term beginning on April 1 of the year after the election, which is held in November of the year before the presidential election. Vacancies in the fiscal officership or on the board of trustees are filled by the remaining trustees.
