= Morgan Township, Gallia County, Ohio =

Township in Ohio, US

- Township
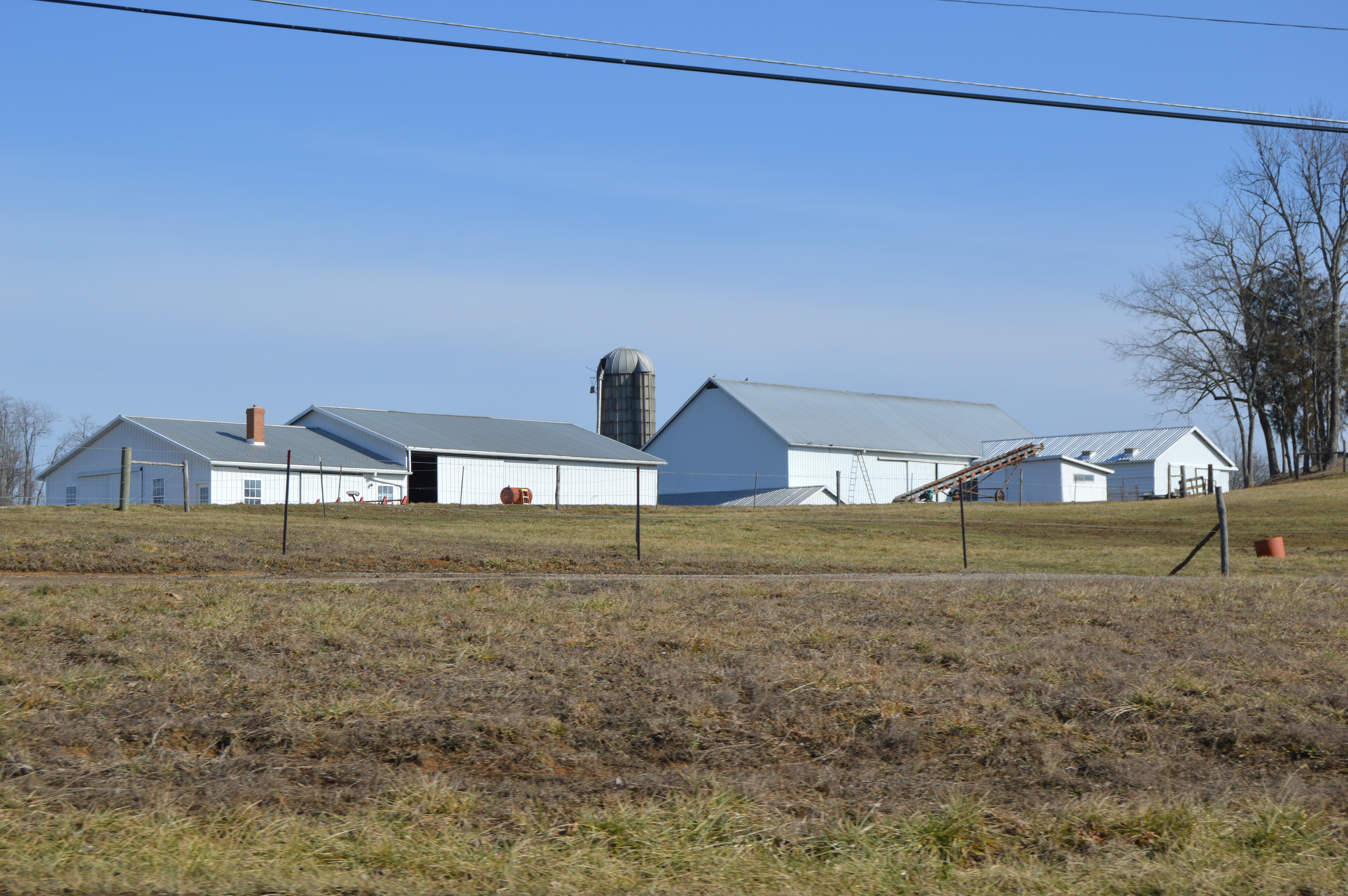
- Farm east of Vinton

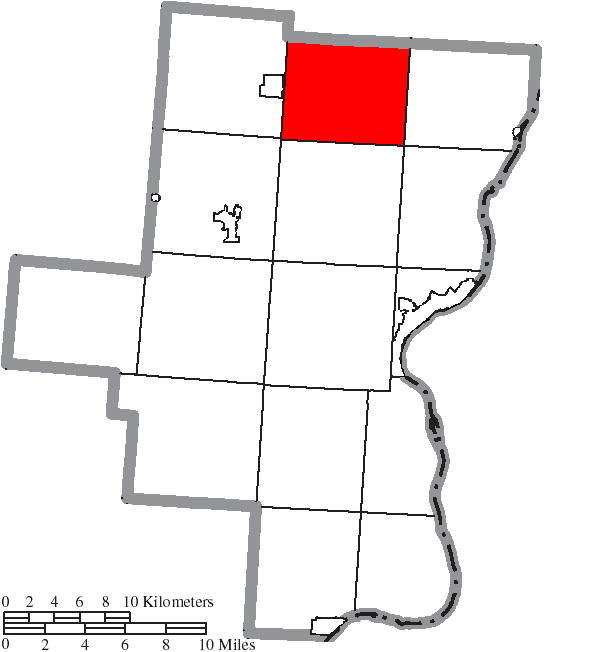
- Location of Morgan Township in Gallia County
- Coordinates: 38°57′45″N 82°16′3″W
- Country: United States
- State: Ohio
- County: Gallia

Area
  - Total: 31.0 sq mi (80.3 km^{2})
  - Land: 31.0 sq mi (80.2 km^{2})
  - Water: 0.039 sq mi (0.1 km^{2})
- Elevation: 712 ft (217 m)

Population (2020)
  - Total: 1,379
  - Density: 44.5/sq mi (17.2/km^{2})
- Time zone: UTC-5 (Eastern (EST))
  - Summer (DST): UTC-4 (EDT)
- FIPS code: 39-52094
- GNIS feature ID: 1086141

Morgan Township is one of the fifteen townships of Gallia County, Ohio, United States. As of the 2020 census the population was 1,379.

== Geography ==
Located in the northern part of the county, it borders the following townships:

- Salem Township, Meigs County - north
- Rutland Township, Meigs County - northeast corner
- Cheshire Township - east
- Addison Township - southeast corner
- Springfield Township - south
- Raccoon Township - southwest corner
- Huntington Township - west

No municipalities are located in Morgan Township.

== Name and history ==
It is one of six Morgan Townships statewide.

== Government ==
The township is governed by a three-member board of trustees, who are elected in November of odd-numbered years to a four-year term beginning on the following January 1. Two are elected in the year after the presidential election and one is elected in the year before it. There is also an elected township fiscal officer, who serves a four-year term beginning on April 1 of the year after the election, which is held in November of the year before the presidential election. Vacancies in the fiscal officership or on the board of trustees are filled by the remaining trustees.
