= Cheshire Township, Ohio =

Township in Ohio, US

Cheshire Township, Gallia County, Ohio
- Township
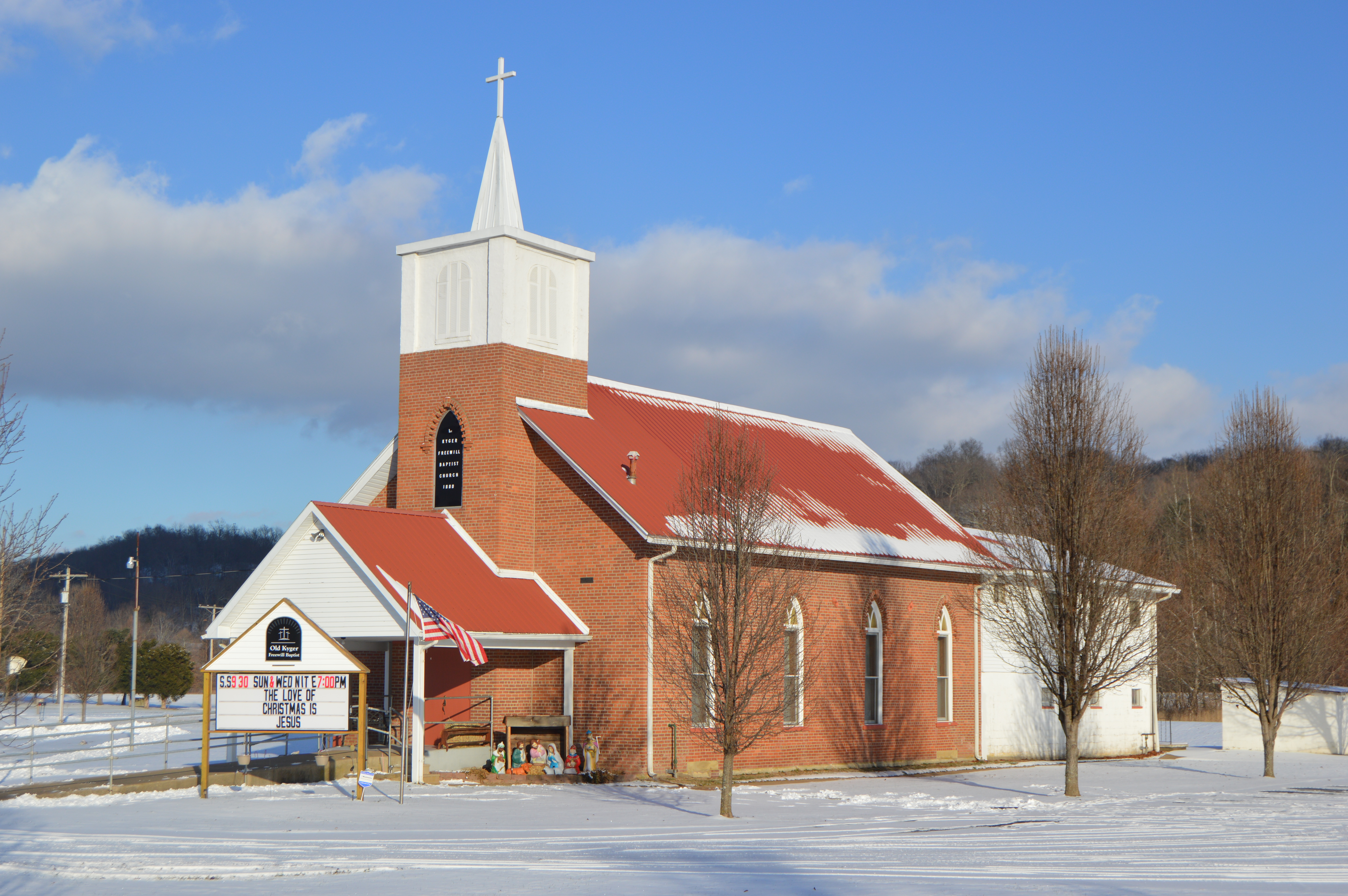
- Old Kyger Freewill Baptist Church

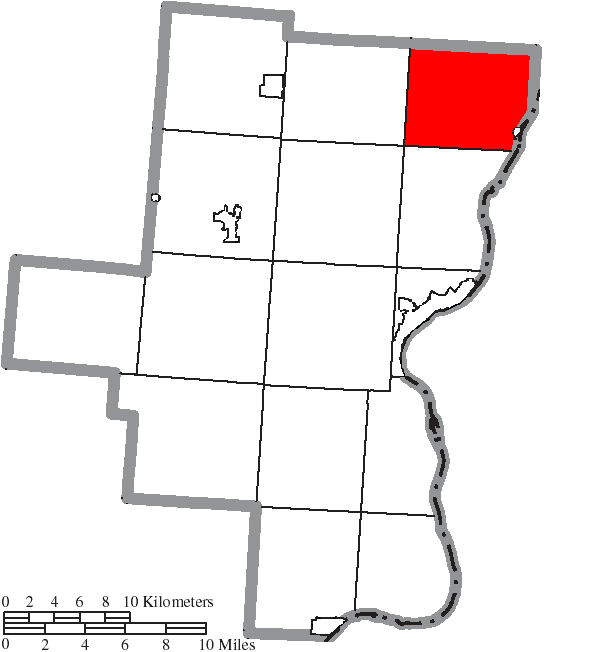
- Location of Cheshire Township in Gallia County
- Coordinates: 38°57′50″N 82°8′30″W
- Country: United States
- State: Ohio
- County: Gallia

Area
  - Total: 30.8 sq mi (79.9 km^{2})
  - Land: 30.3 sq mi (78.6 km^{2})
  - Water: 0.50 sq mi (1.3 km^{2})
- Elevation: 823 ft (251 m)

Population (2020)
  - Total: 898
  - Density: 29.6/sq mi (11.4/km^{2})
- Time zone: UTC-5 (Eastern (EST))
  - Summer (DST): UTC-4 (EDT)
- ZIP code: 45620
- Area code: 740
- FIPS code: 39-13946
- GNIS feature ID: 1086133

Cheshire Township is one of the fifteen townships of Gallia County, Ohio, United States. As of the 2020 census the population was 898.

== Geography ==
Located in the northeastern corner of the county along the Ohio River, it borders the following townships:

- Rutland Township, Meigs County - north
- Salisbury Township, Meigs County - northeast
- Addison Township - south
- Springfield Township - southwest corner
- Morgan Township - west
- Salem Township, Meigs County - northwest corner

Mason County, West Virginia, lies across the Ohio River to the southeast.

The farthest upstream Ohio River township in the county, it includes Gallia County's farthest east point.

The village of Cheshire is located in southeastern Cheshire Township.

== Name and history ==
It is the only Cheshire Township statewide.

== Government ==
The township is governed by a three-member board of trustees, who are elected in November of odd-numbered years to a four-year term beginning on the following January 1. Two are elected in the year after the presidential election and one is elected in the year before it. There is also an elected township fiscal officer, who serves a four-year term beginning on April 1 of the year after the election, which is held in November of the year before the presidential election. Vacancies in the fiscal officership or on the board of trustees are filled by the remaining trustees.
