= Huntington Township, Gallia County, Ohio =

Township in Ohio, US

- Township
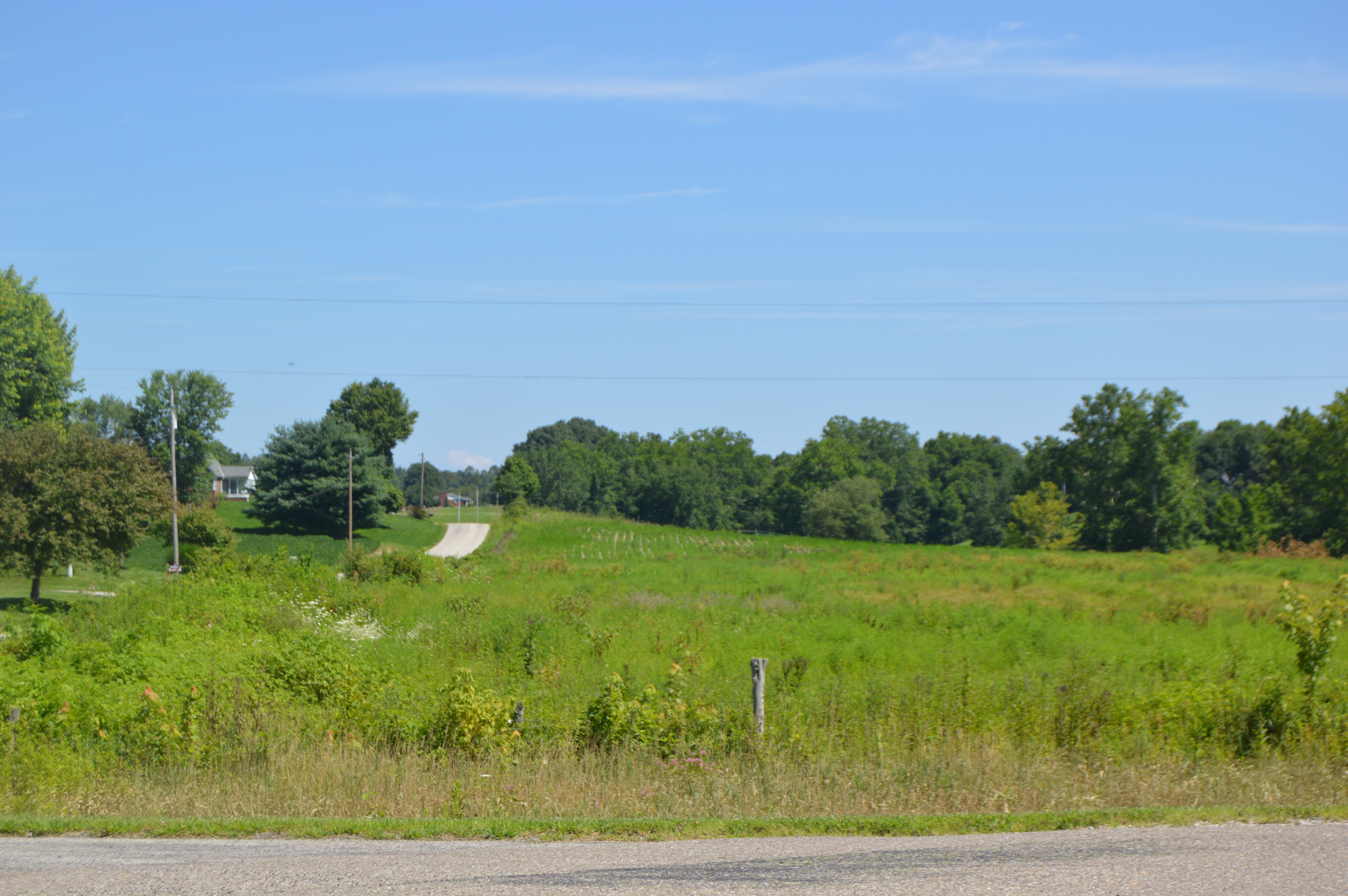
- Fields north of Vinton

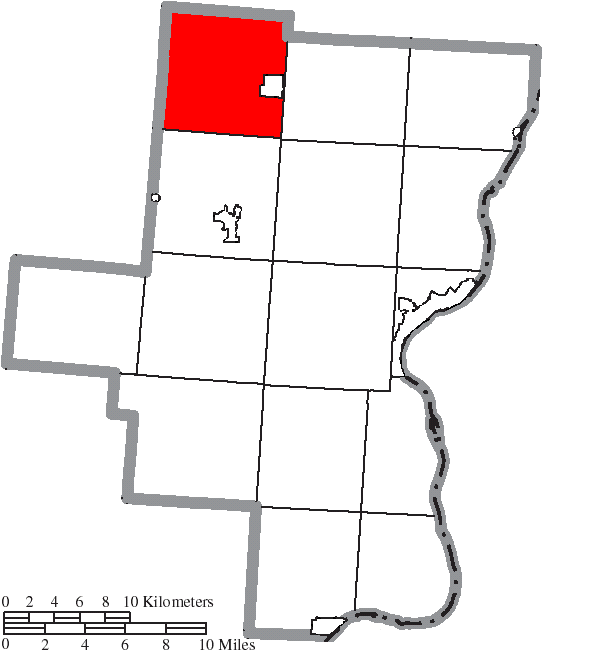
- Location of Huntington Township in Gallia County
- Coordinates: 38°59′17″N 82°22′10″W
- Country: United States
- State: Ohio
- County: Gallia

Area
  - Total: 36.9 sq mi (95.5 km^{2})
  - Land: 36.5 sq mi (94.6 km^{2})
  - Water: 0.35 sq mi (0.9 km^{2})
- Elevation: 659 ft (201 m)

Population (2020)
  - Total: 1,393
  - Density: 38.1/sq mi (14.7/km^{2})
- Time zone: UTC-5 (Eastern (EST))
  - Summer (DST): UTC-4 (EDT)
- FIPS code: 39-36848
- GNIS feature ID: 1086140

Huntington Township is one of the fifteen townships of Gallia County, Ohio, United States. As of the 2020 census the population was 1,393.

== Geography ==
Located in the northwestern corner of the county, it borders the following townships:

- Wilkesville Township, Vinton County - north
- Salem Township, Meigs County - northeast corner
- Morgan Township - east
- Springfield Township - southeast corner
- Raccoon Township - south
- Madison Township, Jackson County - southwest corner
- Bloomfield Township, Jackson County - west
- Milton Township, Jackson County - northwest corner

Vinton, the second smallest village in the county, is located in eastern Huntington Township.

The northernmost township in Gallia County, Huntington Township is the only county township to border Vinton County.

== Name and history ==
Statewide, other Huntington Townships are located in Brown, Lorain, and Ross counties.

== Government ==
The township is governed by a three-member board of trustees, who are elected in November of odd-numbered years to a four-year term beginning on the following January 1. Two are elected in the year after the presidential election and one is elected in the year before it. There is also an elected township fiscal officer, who serves a four-year term beginning on April 1 of the year after the election, which is held in November of the year before the presidential election. Vacancies in the fiscal officership or on the board of trustees are filled by the remaining trustees.
