= Mike Bartrum =

American football player and coach (born 1970)

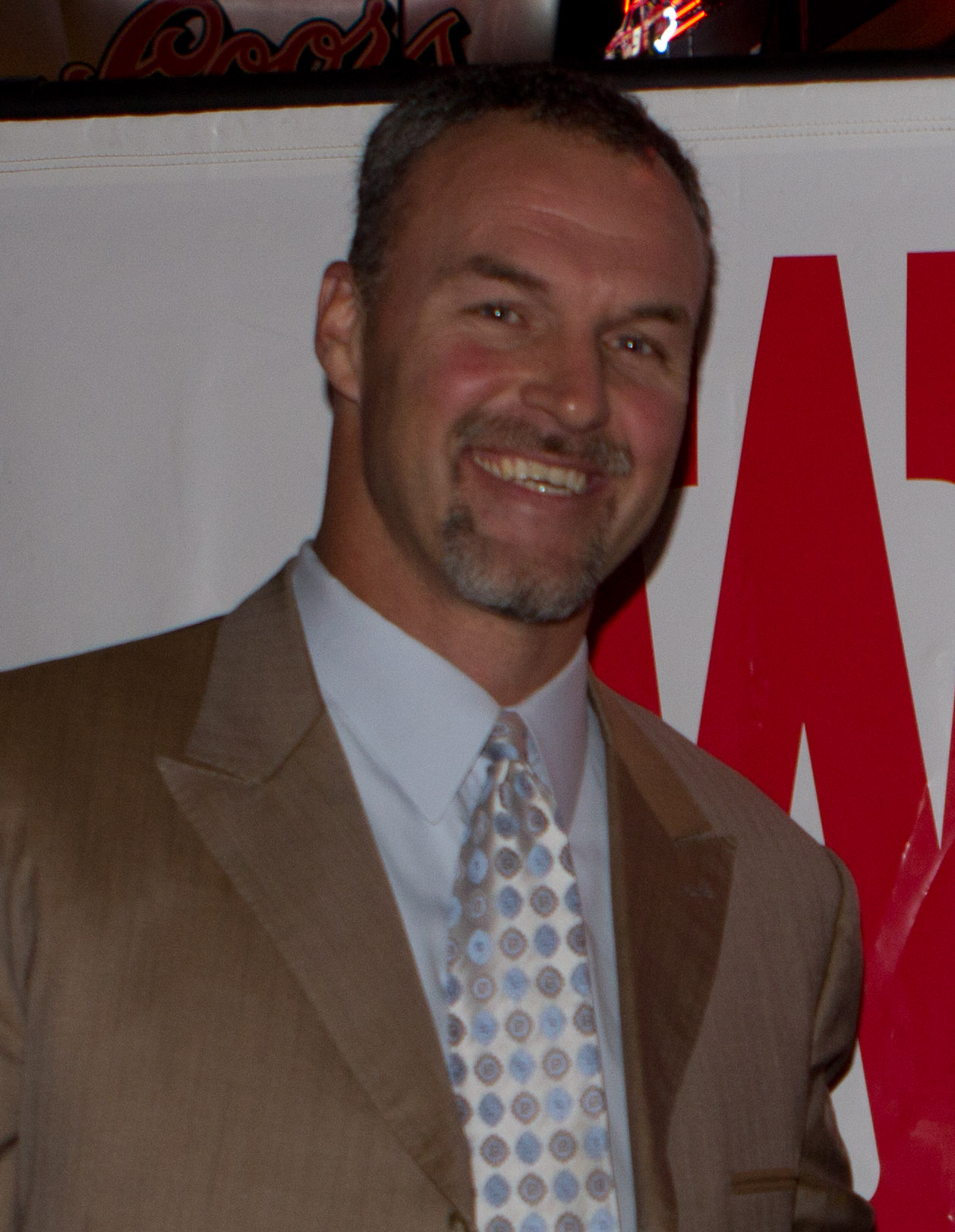
- Mike Bartrum after speaking to the Wendy's 2010 Heisman Winners in Portsmouth, Ohio.

Rio Grande RedStorm
- Title: Head coach

Personal information
- Born: June 23, 1970 (age 56); Gallipolis, Ohio, U.S.
- Listed height: 6 ft 4 in (1.93 m)
- Listed weight: 245 lb (111 kg)

Career information
- Position: Long snapper / tight end (No. 87, 48, 86, 88)
- High school: Meigs (Pomeroy, Ohio)
- College: Marshall
- NFL draft: 1993: undrafted

Career history

Playing
- Kansas City Chiefs (1993); Green Bay Packers (1995); New England Patriots (1996–1999); Philadelphia Eagles (2000–2006)

Coaching
- Meigs HS (OH) (2012–2018) Head coach; Philadelphia Eagles (2019–2020) Assistant tight ends coach; Marshall (2021–2025) Senior analyst & special assistant; Rio Grande (2026–present) Head coach

Awards and highlights
- Pro Bowl (2005)

Career NFL statistics
- Receptions: 11
- Receiving yards: 65
- Receiving touchdowns: 6
- Stats at Pro Football Reference

Head coaching record
- Career: 0–0 (–)

Michael Weldon Bartrum (born June 23, 1970) is an American football coach and former player. He is the head football coach for the University of Rio Grande, a position he has held since 2026. He played professionally for 13 seasons as a long snapper and tight end in the National Football League (NFL), and was considered one of the best long snappers while he was playing. He played for the Kansas City Chiefs, Green Bay Packers, New England Patriots and Philadelphia Eagles. He retired in 2007 after suffering a neck injury in a 2006 game.

== Early life ==
Bartrum attended Meigs High School in Pomeroy, Ohio and was a letterman in football, basketball, and baseball. In football, he passed for 1,900 yards and 24 touchdowns during his junior and senior seasons.

== College career ==
Bartrum played college football at Marshall University intending to play quarterback, and that lasted all of one practice in August 1988. Bartrum was moved to tight end and was a redshirt in 1988, then backed up All-American Eric Ihnat in 1989. A knee injury in the spring game knocked him out of the 1990 season, but he returned to top form for his junior and senior seasons. In 1991 and 1992, he hauled in 109 receptions and 10 touchdowns, third among tight ends all-time for the Thundering Herd. His senior year, he played on Marshall's first Division I-AA championship team that won a then school record 12 games. Bartrum caught a touchdown pass to open the scoring in the 1992 NCAA Division I-AA Football Championship Game, a 31–28 win over Youngstown State, the team that had defeated Marshall in the prior season's title game. Bartrum was All-Southern Conference second-team TE in 1991 and first-team All-SoCon in 1992 as well as second-team All-American on The Sports Network team that same season. It was his tight end coach, Mark Gale, at Marshall who taught him how to play long snapper, giving him his route to the National Football League.

In 2007, Bartrum was elected to the Marshall University Hall of Fame for his collegiate career in football and baseball.

== Professional career ==
Bartrum saw minimal playing time in his early career and taught special education when he was not playing. Between the Kansas City Chiefs (1993) and the Green Bay Packers (1995) Bartrum only saw action in a total of seven games with no receptions.

From 1996 to 1999, he was a regular long snapper with the New England Patriots playing 57 games with two receptions, both of which were touchdowns. He played in Super Bowl XXXI with the Pats in the loss to the Green Bay Packers and teamed with former Marshall teammate Troy Brown for the four years in New England.

Signing with the Eagles in 2000, he took over as the long snapper and tight end. He caught nine passes, four of which went for touchdowns. Following the 2004 season, Bartrum would make his second Super Bowl appearance in Super Bowl XXXIX, handling the long snapper duties in the Eagles' 24–21 loss to his former team, the Patriots. In 2005, he handled kickoff duties in two games due to an injury to David Akers. His play earned him a selection to the Pro Bowl after the 2005 season. In 2006, Bartrum was the emergency quarterback after an injury to Donovan McNabb. Bartrum has six career touchdowns in 11 receptions. Only Mike Vrabel has a higher percentage of catches for touchdowns, with eleven career catches which were all for touchdowns.

Due to injuries to his spine in 2006, Bartrum retired in the spring of 2007. He and Brown sponsor a long-running camp at Marshall University for children, and the proceeds of the camp, auction and golf outing weekend have been split between their alma mater and Huntington and Meigs-Pomeroy youth groups for over a decade. In 2007, he was honored on Alumni Weekend at Marshall University as the Distinguished Alumnus of the Year.

After a defeat to the Colts in November 2006, Bartrum complained of extreme pain in his neck. Testing revealed that Bartrum had an "incidental finding of a small chip on one of the bodies of his vertebrae." An MRI showed some bulging in one disc as well as a disc which was "herniated centrally and is lying against his spinal cord." The Eagles placed Bartrum on injured reserve for the remainder of the season, and Jon Dorenbos took over long snapper duties for the Eagles for the remainder of the season. Bartrum remained a member of the Eagles until June 2007, when he announced his retirement from football.

== Coaching career ==
In April 2012, Bartrum was named head football coach of his alma mater, Meigs High School in Pomeroy, Ohio.

On February 8, 2019, the Philadelphia Eagles announced Bartrum as the Eagles' assistant tight ends coach.

In February 2021, Bartrum was hired at Marshall as a senior analyst and special assistant to the head coach under first-year head coach Charles Huff.

On December 26, 2025, Bartrum was named head coach for the Rio Grande RedStorm, replacing Mark Thurston.

== Head coaching record ==
Year	Team	Overall	Conference	Standing	Bowl/playoffs
Rio Grande RedStorm (Appalachian Athletic Conference) (2026–present)
2026	Rio Grande	0–0	0–0		
Rio Grande:		0–0	0–0		
Total:		0–0			

== Personal ==
After retiring from his playing career, Bartrum returned to his home town of Pomeroy, Ohio, and started a Christian-based preschool. He also started flag football for the youth of the area and in November 2008 he was elected Meigs County Commissioner. In April 2012, Bartrum was named head football coach of his alma mater, Meigs High School. His son Ty plays defensive back for UCF Knights football.
