= Milton Township, Jackson County, Ohio =

Township in Ohio, US

- Township
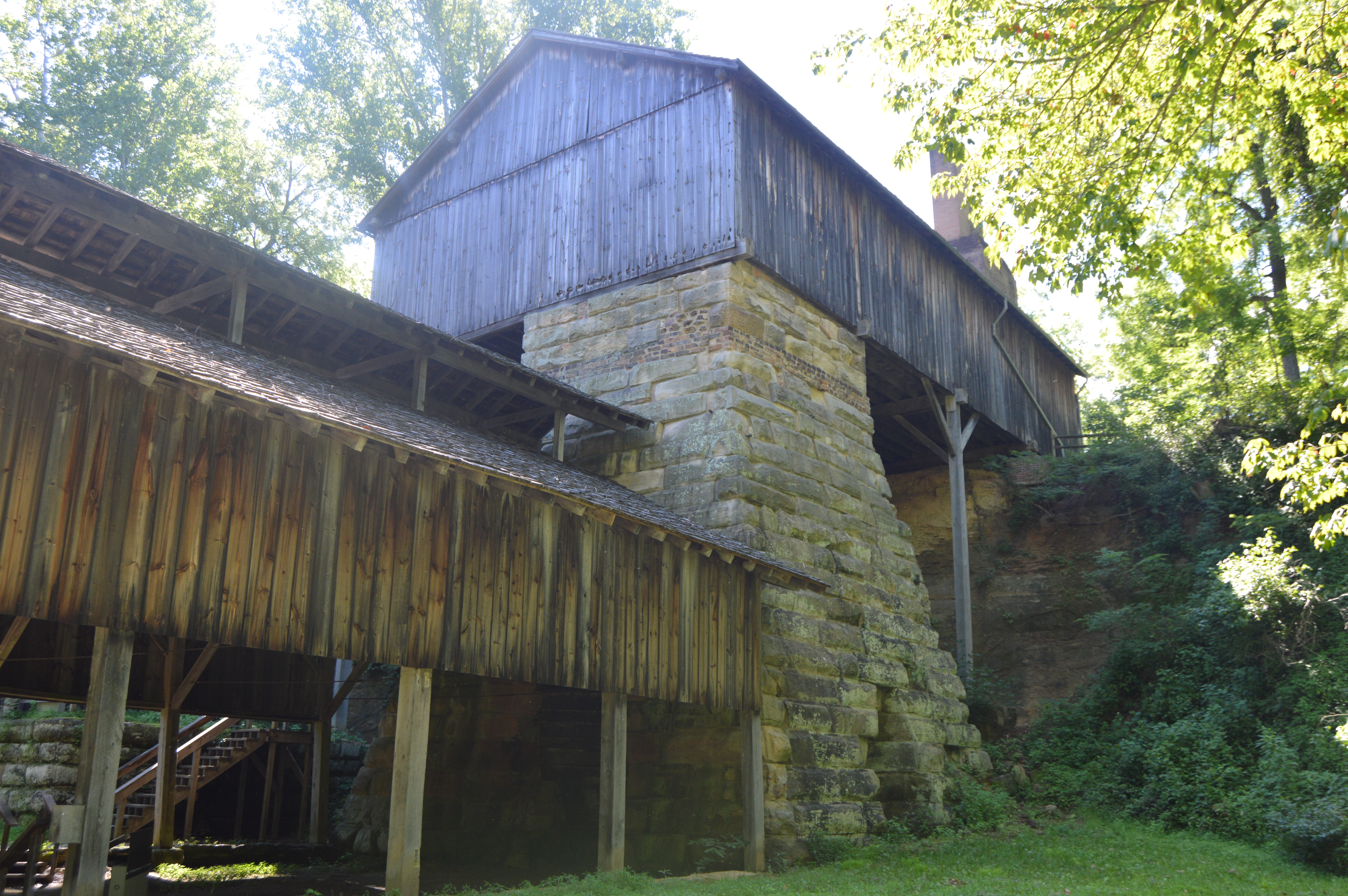
- Restored Buckeye Furnace complex

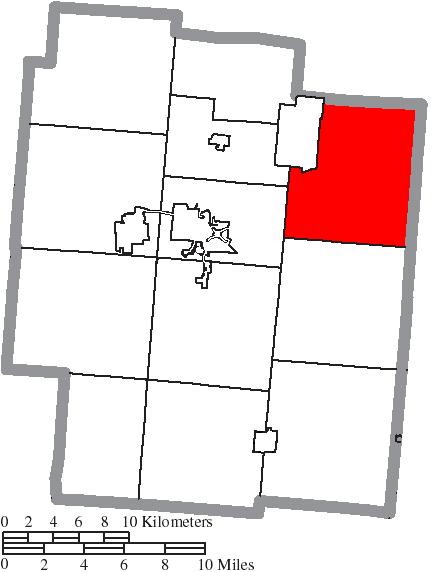
- Location of Milton Township in Jackson County
- Coordinates: 39°5′34″N 82°29′57″W
- Country: United States
- State: Ohio
- County: Jackson

Area
  - Total: 39.5 sq mi (102.3 km^{2})
  - Land: 39.4 sq mi (102.0 km^{2})
  - Water: 0.12 sq mi (0.3 km^{2})
- Elevation: 720 ft (220 m)

Population (2020)
  - Total: 1,034
  - Density: 26.26/sq mi (10.14/km^{2})
- Time zone: UTC-5 (Eastern (EST))
  - Summer (DST): UTC-4 (EDT)
- FIPS code: 39-50624
- GNIS feature ID: 1086372

Milton Township is one of the twelve townships of Jackson County, Ohio, United States. As of the 2020 census, 1,034 people lived in the township.

== Geography ==
Located in the northeastern corner of the county, it borders the following townships:

- Clinton Township, Vinton County: north
- Vinton Township, Vinton County: northeast
- Wilkesville Township, Vinton County: east
- Huntington Township, Gallia County: southeast corner
- Bloomfield Township: south
- Lick Township: southwest
- Coal Township: west
- Washington Township: northwest

Much of northwestern Milton Township is occupied by the city of Wellston, and the unincorporated community of Wainwright is located in the township's north.

== Name and history ==
Milton Township was organized as an original township of Jackson County, and named after John Milton (1608–1674), an English poet. It is one of five Milton Townships statewide.

== Government ==
The township is governed by a three-member board of trustees, who are elected in November of odd-numbered years to a four-year term beginning on the following January 1. Two are elected in the year after the presidential election and one is elected in the year before it. There is also an elected township fiscal officer, who serves a four-year term beginning on April 1 of the year after the election, which is held in November of the year before the presidential election. Vacancies in the fiscal officership or on the board of trustees are filled by the remaining trustees.
