= Prattsville, Ohio =

Unincorporated community in Ohio, U.S.

Coordinates: 39°14′19″N 82°23′29″W

Prattsville is an unincorporated community in Madison Township, Vinton County, Ohio, in the United States.

== History ==
Prattsville, also known as Lone Star, had a post office established in 1848 and remained in operation until 1875.
