= Oreton, Ohio =

- Ghost town
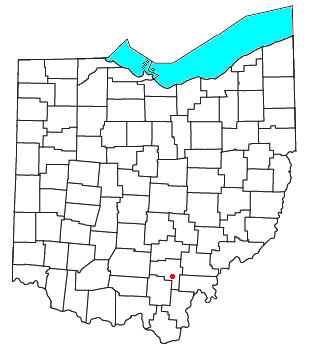
- Location of Oreton, Ohio
- Coordinates: 39°09′50″N 82°24′46″W
- Country: United States
- State: Ohio
- County: Vinton
- Township: Vinton Township
- Elevation: 692 ft (211 m)
- GNIS feature ID: 1062925

Oreton is a ghost town in eastern Vinton Township, Vinton County, Ohio, United States, located along State Route 160. Oreton was a small mining community. Today, all that remains are the crumbled ruins of the iron furnace, a few concrete foundations, and the brick safe of Dave Ebert's company store.

== History ==
Oreton was a New York Coal Company mining town. The town had a post office from 1880 to 1950, as well as a church (Azariah McManis was the caretaker), and as many as 70 houses for the miners and families, most of them built by a Bert Harder. There are recorded births as early as 1853.

A number of coal and iron ore mines were in the area. There was also an iron furnace that operated in the last half of the 1800s. Superintendent of the Eagle's Furnace was Samuel T. Benner, a Civil War veteran of Company L, 12th Ohio Cavalry.

Although Oreton was a town for over 100 years, the town never had a cemetery. Burials took place in nearby towns, several miles away.

Oreton was originally known as Aleshire, according to postal records.
