= Vinton Township, Vinton County, Ohio =

Township in Ohio, US

- Township
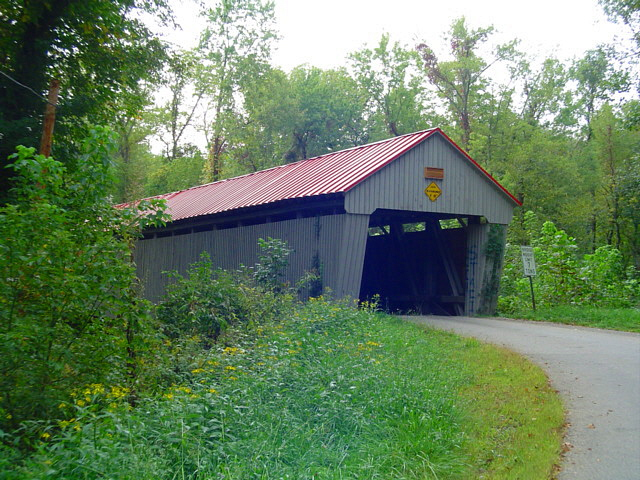
- Eakin Mill Covered Bridge, a historic site in the township

- Location in Vinton County and the state of Ohio.
- Coordinates: 39°9′36″N 82°22′27″W
- Country: United States
- State: Ohio
- County: Vinton

Area
  - Total: 36.9 sq mi (95.6 km^{2})
  - Land: 36.9 sq mi (95.6 km^{2})
  - Water: 0 sq mi (0.0 km^{2})
- Elevation: 850 ft (260 m)

Population (2020)
  - Total: 544
  - Density: 14.7/sq mi (5.69/km^{2})
- Time zone: UTC-5 (Eastern (EST))
  - Summer (DST): UTC-4 (EDT)
- FIPS code: 39-80192
- GNIS feature ID: 1087109

Vinton Township is one of the twelve townships of Vinton County, Ohio, United States. The 2020 census found 544 people in the township.

== Geography ==
Located in the southern part of the county, it borders the following townships:

- Madison Township: north
- Knox Township: northeast
- Columbia Township, Meigs County: east
- Salem Township, Meigs County: southeast corner
- Wilkesville Township: south
- Milton Township, Jackson County: southwest
- Clinton Township: west
- Elk Township: northwest corner

No municipalities are located in Vinton Township, although the unincorporated community of Oreton lies in the township's west.

== Name and history ==
Like the county in which it is contained, Vinton Township was named for Samuel Finley Vinton.

It is the only Vinton Township statewide.

== Government ==
The township is governed by a three-member board of trustees, who are elected in November of odd-numbered years to a four-year term beginning on the following January 1. Two are elected in the year after the presidential election and one is elected in the year before it. There is also an elected township fiscal officer, who serves a four-year term beginning on April 1 of the year after the election, which is held in November of the year before the presidential election. Vacancies in the fiscal officership or on the board of trustees are filled by the remaining trustees.
