= Wilkesville Township, Vinton County, Ohio =

Township in Ohio, US

- Township
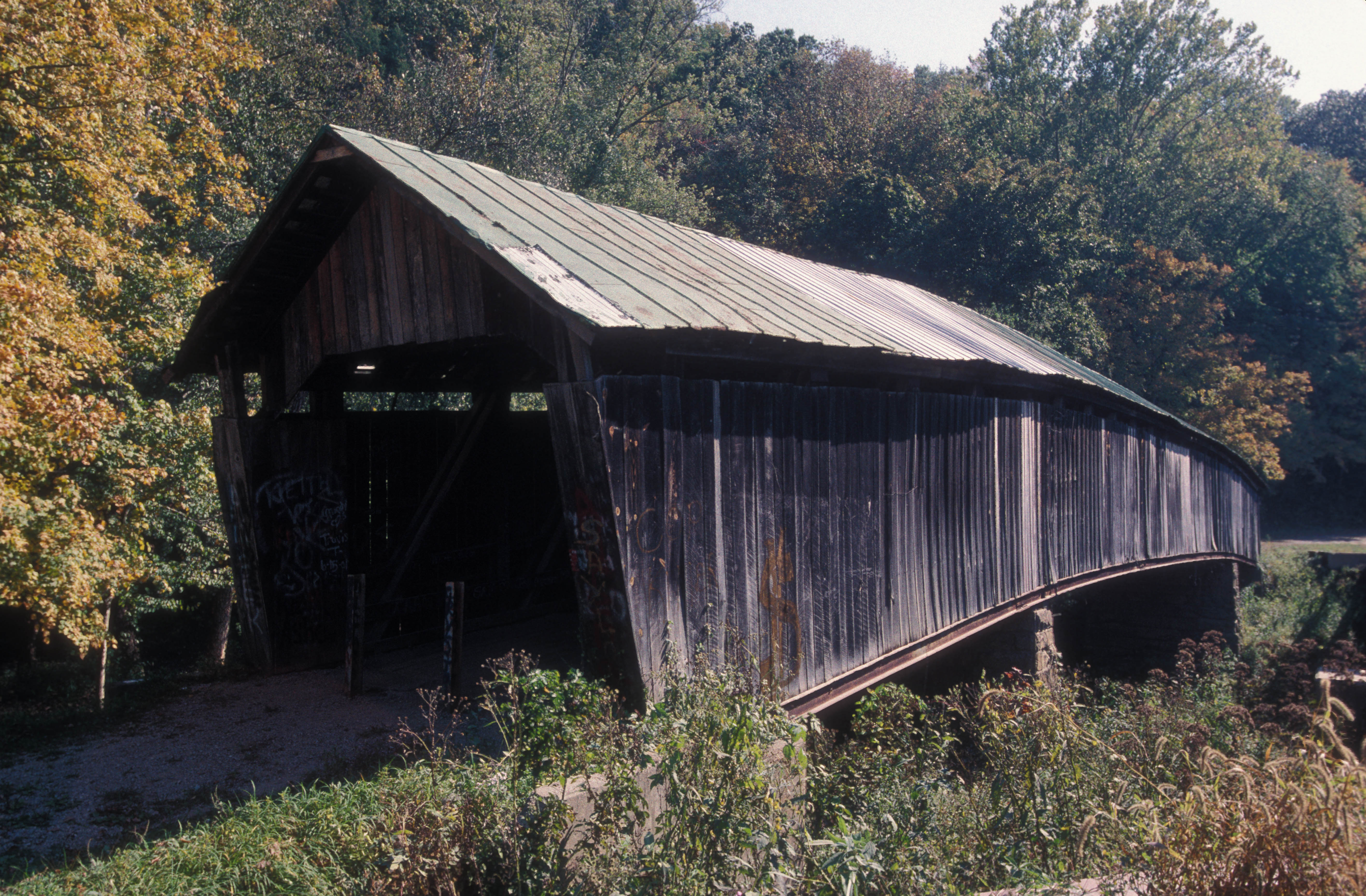
- The former Ponn Humpback Covered Bridge over Raccoon Creek

- Location in Vinton County and the state of Ohio.
- Coordinates: 39°5′0″N 82°22′0″W
- Country: United States
- State: Ohio
- County: Vinton

Area
  - Total: 36.6 sq mi (94.9 km^{2})
  - Land: 36.6 sq mi (94.9 km^{2})
  - Water: 0 sq mi (0.0 km^{2})
- Elevation: 761 ft (232 m)

Population (2020)
  - Total: 810
  - Density: 22/sq mi (8.5/km^{2})
- Time zone: UTC-5 (Eastern (EST))
  - Summer (DST): UTC-4 (EDT)
- ZIP code: 45695
- Area code: 740
- FIPS code: 39-85204
- GNIS feature ID: 1087110

Wilkesville Township is one of the twelve townships of Vinton County, Ohio, United States. The 2020 census found 810 people in the township, 116 of whom lived in the village of Wilkesville.

== Geography ==
Located in the far southern part of the county, it borders the following townships:

- Vinton Township: north
- Columbia Township, Meigs County: northeast corner
- Salem Township, Meigs County: east
- Huntington Township, Gallia County: south
- Bloomfield Township, Jackson County: southwest corner
- Milton Township, Jackson County: west

The farthest south township in Vinton County, it is the only county township to border Gallia County.

Wilkesville, the smallest village in Vinton County, is located in eastern Wilkesville Township.

== Name and history ==
Wilkesville Township was organized in 1815, when its territory was part of Gallia County.

It is the only Wilkesville Township statewide.

== Government ==
The township is governed by a three-member board of trustees, who are elected in November of odd-numbered years to a four-year term beginning on the following January 1. Two are elected in the year after the presidential election and one is elected in the year before it. There is also an elected township fiscal officer, who serves a four-year term beginning on April 1 of the year after the election, which is held in November of the year before the presidential election. Vacancies in the fiscal officership or on the board of trustees are filled by the remaining trustees.
