= Meigs County Fairgrounds =

- Meigs County Fairgrounds, Grandstand and Racetrack
- U.S. National Register of Historic Places
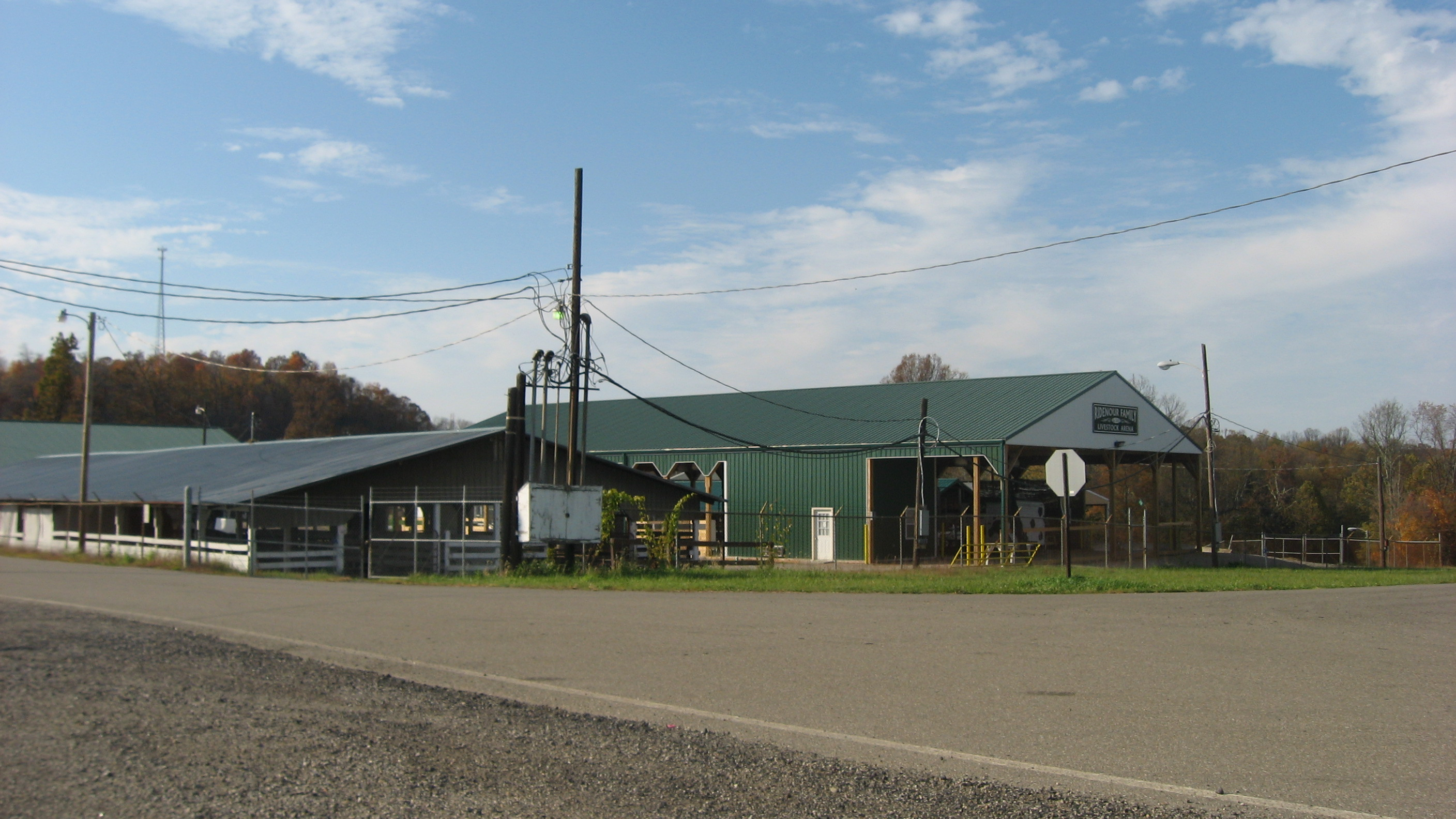
- Buildings at the fairgrounds

- Location within Ohio Location within the United States
- Location: State Route 124 near Rock Springs, Ohio
- Coordinates: 39°3′44″N 82°0′53″W
- Area: 11 acres (4.5 ha)
- Built: 1889
- NRHP reference No.: 82001473
- Added to NRHP: November 29, 1982

The Meigs County Fairgrounds is a county fairgrounds located north of Pomeroy in Meigs County, Ohio, United States. Some of the fairgrounds has been designated a historic site, with particular emphasis having been placed on the fairgrounds' racetrack and its associated grandstand.

The first Meigs County Fair was held in the village of Middleport on Wednesday, October 22, 1851. In 1968, Jane and Leonard Carleton sold 10 1/4 acres to the Meigs County Agricultural Society. This land would become part of the Rocksprings Fairgrounds. Jane Carleton deeded 98 additional rods of land to the Meigs County Agricultural Society on Christmas Eve of 1899. The construction dates of some elements of the grounds are unknown, but the present sharply-curved racetrack was finished in 1889 or earlier, when it was converted from a one-third mile track into a half mile track. In 1890, donations by average citizens paid for the construction of a grandstand by the track to supplement a nearby hillside where fairgoers had previously sat. Instead of being placed simply along one side of the track, the grandstand curves around the northeastern turn of the track; it is the only curved grandstand at an Ohio county fairgrounds. The grandstand is capable of holding one thousand people.

In 1946, a Junior Fair Board was established, and it is made up of kids from groups that make up the Junior Fair. The Junior Fair Board is still in effect to this day.

In 1982, much of the fairgrounds, including the racetrack and grandstand, was listed on the National Register of Historic Places. Besides the unusual method of construction seen in the grandstand and track, the fairgrounds qualified for its importance in the area's social history as a reflection of the importance of fairgoing, especially harness racing at the track, to Meigs County residents.
