= Salisbury Township, Meigs County, Ohio =

Township in Ohio, US

- Township
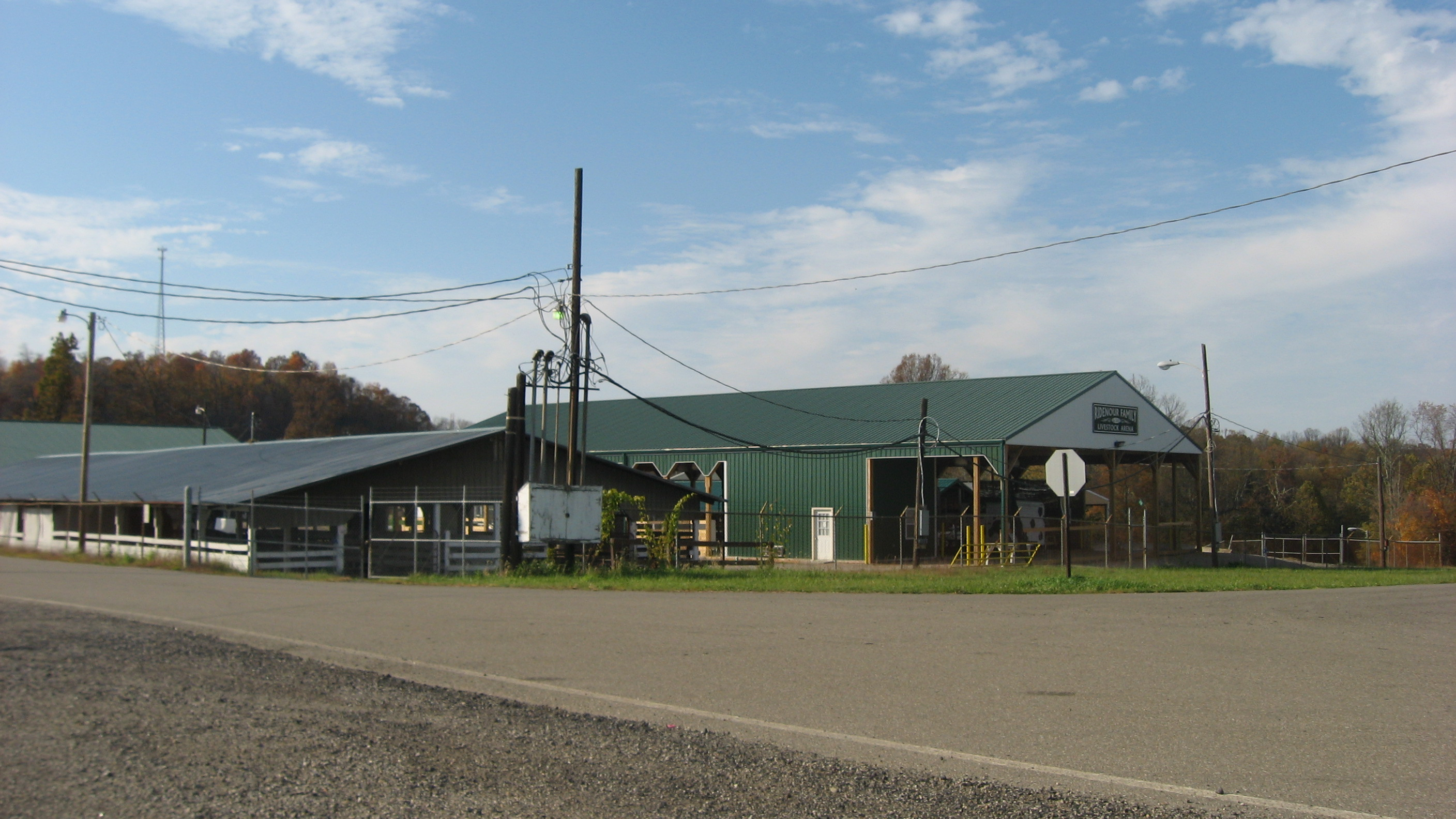
- Buildings at the Meigs County Fairgrounds

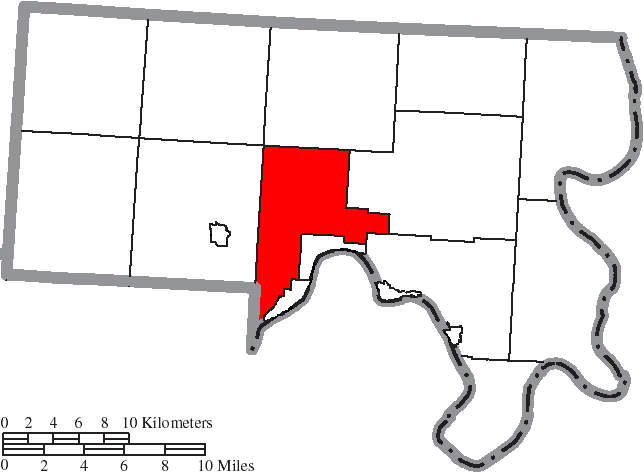
- Location of Salisbury Township in Meigs County
- Coordinates: 39°1′18″N 82°2′43″W
- Country: United States
- State: Ohio
- County: Meigs

Area
  - Total: 34.2 sq mi (88.5 km^{2})
  - Land: 34.0 sq mi (88.0 km^{2})
  - Water: 0.23 sq mi (0.6 km^{2})
- Elevation: 784 ft (239 m)

Population (2020)
  - Total: 5,512
  - Density: 162/sq mi (62.6/km^{2})
- Time zone: UTC-5 (Eastern (EST))
  - Summer (DST): UTC-4 (EDT)
- FIPS code: 39-70114
- GNIS feature ID: 1086617

Salisbury Township is one of the twelve townships of Meigs County, Ohio, United States. The 2020 census found 5,512 people in the township.

== Geography ==
Located in the central part of the county along the Ohio River, it borders the following townships:

- Bedford Township - north
- Chester Township - northeast
- Sutton Township - southeast
- Cheshire Township, Gallia County - southwest
- Rutland Township - west
- Scipio Township - northwest corner

Mason County, West Virginia lies across the Ohio River to the south.

It is the farthest downstream of Meigs County's Ohio River townships.

Two villages are located along Salisbury Township's shoreline: Middleport, the largest village in the county, in the southwest, and Pomeroy, the county seat, in the southeast.

== Name and history ==
Salisbury Township in Ohio was formed and organized on January 11, 1805, by the county commissioners of Gallia County when they abolished Kerr's Township. It is the only Salisbury Township statewide. Rutland Township was partitioned from Salisbury Township and organized in 1812. Salisbury Township was transferred from Gallia County to Meigs County when it was formed in 1819.

Located off State Route 124 near Rock Springs, the Meigs County Fairgrounds is listed on the National Register of Historic Places.

== Government ==
The township is governed by a three-member board of trustees, who are elected in November of odd-numbered years to a four-year term beginning on the following January 1. Two are elected in the year after the presidential election and one is elected in the year before it. There is also an elected township fiscal officer, who serves a four-year term beginning on April 1 of the year after the election, which is held in November of the year before the presidential election. Vacancies in the fiscal officership or on the board of trustees are filled by the remaining trustees.
