= Pomeroy, Ohio =

- Village
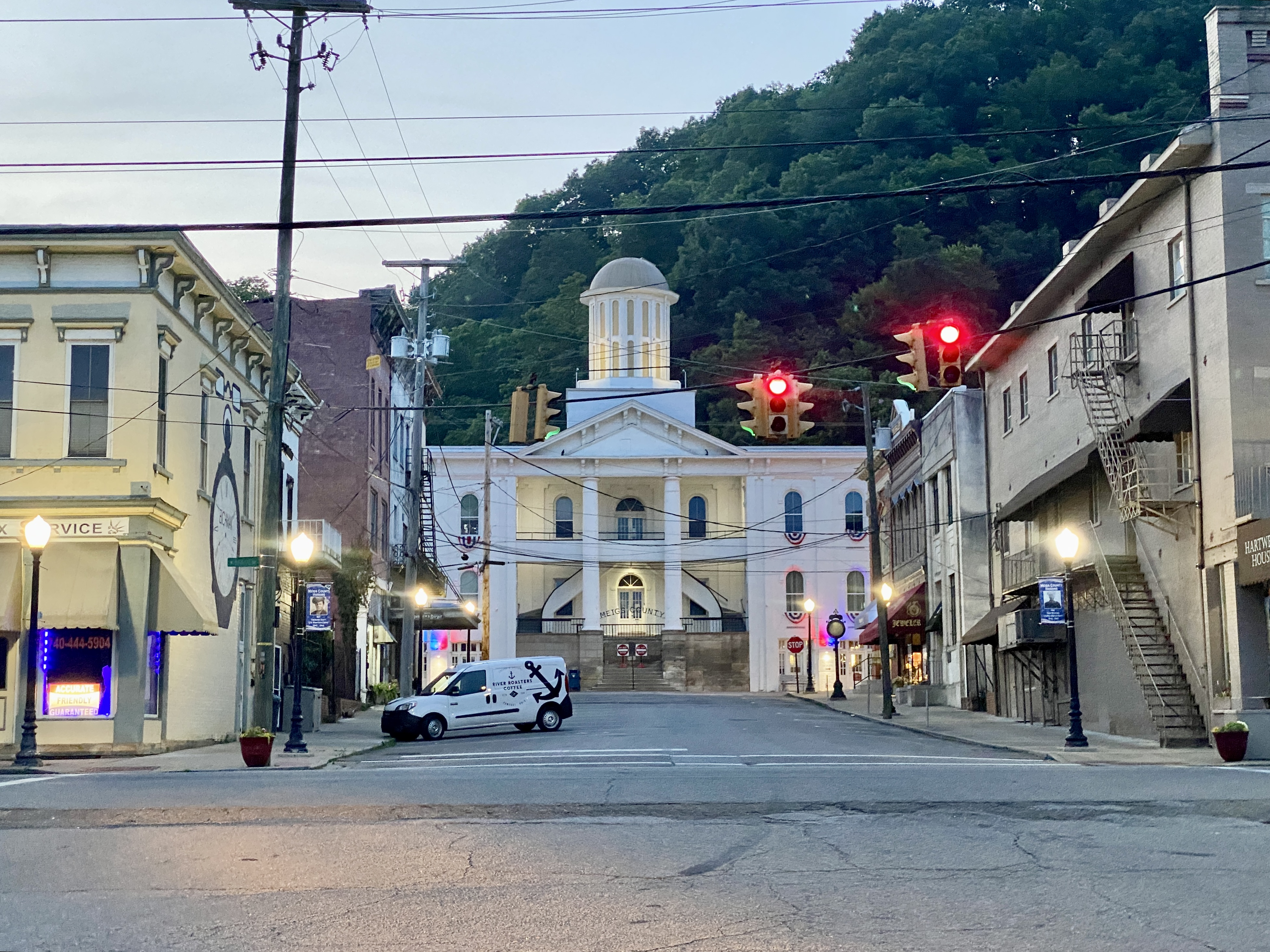
- Intersection of Main Street and Court Street, with the courthouse in the middle
- Interactive map of Pomeroy, Ohio
- Location within Ohio Location within the United States
- Coordinates: 39°01′48″N 82°01′10″W
- Country: United States
- State: Ohio
- County: Meigs
- Township: Salisbury

Area
  - Total: 3.34 sq mi (8.66 km^{2})
  - Land: 3.28 sq mi (8.50 km^{2})
  - Water: 0.062 sq mi (0.16 km^{2})
- Elevation: 755 ft (230 m)

Population (2020)
  - Total: 1,573
  - Density: 479.3/sq mi (185.05/km^{2})
- Time zone: UTC-5 (Eastern (EST))
  - Summer (DST): UTC-4 (EDT)
- ZIP code: 45769
- Area code: 740
- FIPS code: 39-64024
- GNIS feature ID: 2398996
- Website: https://www.villagepomeroy.us/

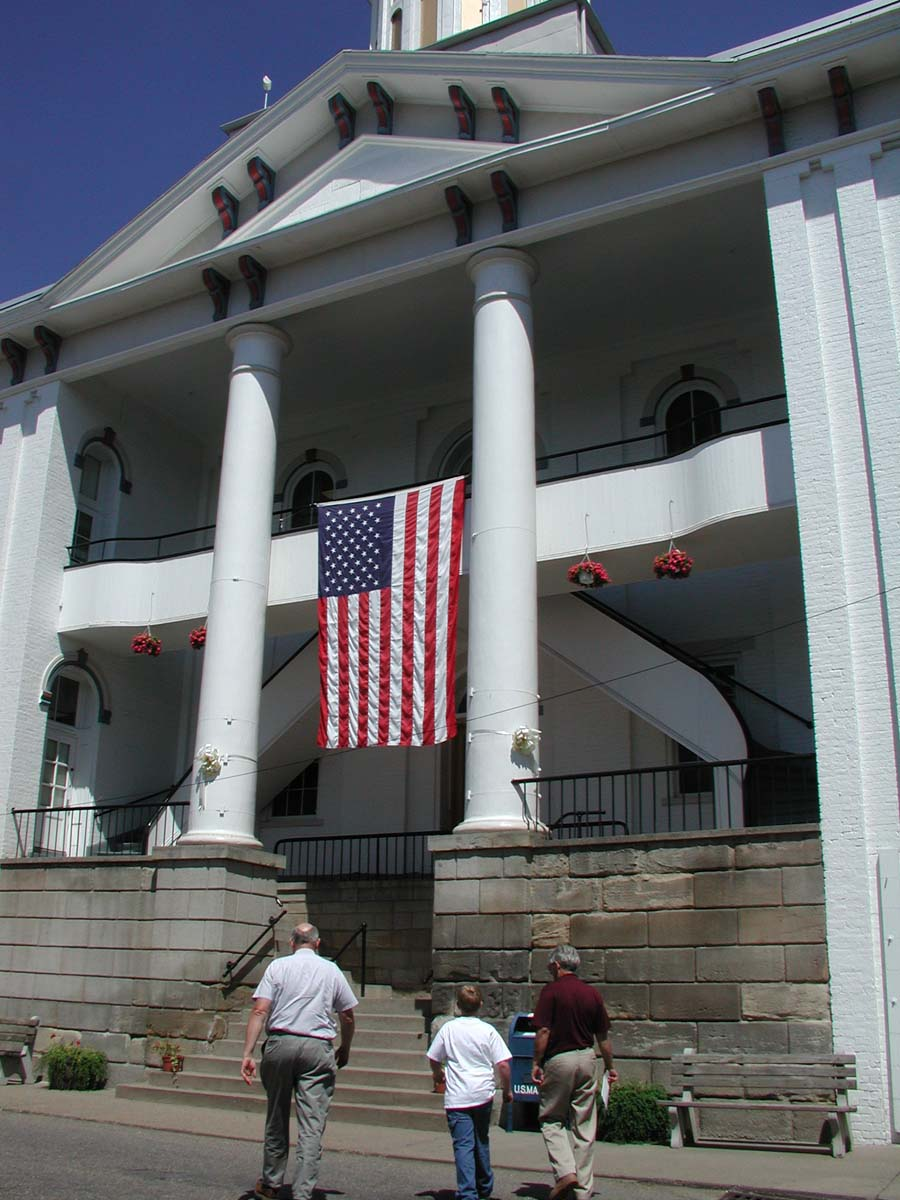
Set into the side of a cliff, the three-story Meigs County courthouse offers a ground level entrance on each story, gaining it a mention in Ripley's Believe It or Not!

Pomeroy (/ˈpʌmrɔɪ/ PUM-roy) is a village in Meigs County, Ohio, United States, and its county seat. It lies along the Ohio River about 21 miles (34 km) south of Athens. The population was 1,573 at the 2020 census.

== History ==
Pomeroy was founded in 1804 and named for landowner Samuel Pomeroy. The village was incorporated in 1840, and designated county seat in 1841.

=== Settlement and economic development ===
The earliest history of Pomeroy begins with the arrival of Samuel Ervin at what is now Kerr’s Run in 1806. Coal mining was begun in 1819. In 1821 Josiah Dill opened a tavern there and Nial Nye in 1826 operated a tavern, mill and wharf-boat. In 1827 a town was laid out and named Nyesville.

In 1830 Samuel Wyllys Pomeroy of Massachusetts, arriving by boat from Cincinnati enjoyed the view from the Nye tavern, and the wild turkey, turtle and Ohio River fish. After viewing his coal land purchased in Massachusetts in 1804, and the fertile fields of the county he deemed it “a good healthy place to live, and with proper management a bright industrial future.”

He established the Pomeroy Son’s Company and sent his son-in-law Valentine B. Horton, to develop coal and other industrial possibilities.

Horton developed the mines, persuaded eastern settlers and those from Germany, Ireland, and Wales to come to Pomeroy to mine the coal; instituted modern methods in mining; developed the transportation of coal by the river, building the first coal barges and in 1836 the first boat (Condor) which was fired by coal instead of wood.

He brought about the incorporation of the village in 1841, and through political maneuvering the removal of the county court from Chester to Pomeroy in the same year.

When salt was discovered in deep wells near the river (1848) he developed the industry, using the local coal to process the salt. Excelsior Salt Co., among many, opened during that period and continued in business until 1975 when the Environmental Protection Agency forced its closing because of high Sulphur coal smoke in the air and the brine polluting the river.

By 1870 Pomeroy, with a population of 5,000, was a prosperous industrial town. River traffic was heavy. There were steel mills, machine shops, a brewery, an organ factory, a buggy & wagon factory, copper shops, tanneries, cobbler shops, jewelry stores, bake shops, meat markets, blacksmith shops, furniture factories, boat builders, millinery shops, monument works, flour mills, livery stables, clothing and grocery stores. A newspaper was published in 1843, the telegraph line came in 1848 and the railroad in 1886: the horse-powered ferry to Mason, WV in 1854 and the steam ferry in 1847. There were doctors, dentists and lawyers.

The early 20th century was the time of greatest prosperity for Meigs County and likewise Pomeroy. Production of salt, chemicals and coal and their derivatives was at its peak. WWI brought a demand for coal. The Ebersbach family assumed coal production where Horton and others left off; also, as machinery. After the strikes of the 1920s and the depression of the 1930s both coal and salt businesses began to wane, labor problems were great, and salt became more accessible elsewhere.

During WWII and after the building of the bridge across the Ohio River and the TNT plant in West Virginia, there was a sudden and temporary boom in prosperity, but when the war was over, coal and salt production was not resumed. Any condition which affected the region affected the county seat. The population began to decrease and has continued to do so until recent years. Railroads have ceased operation into the Bend and this adversely affected business.

=== Schools ===
During the late 1880s, a school was built in the oldest part of town in Kerr’s Run. The school was known as the “Kerr’s Run Colored School”. The school educates children from the first to eighth grade, including James Edwin Campbell and James McHenry Jones, first and third presidents of what is now West Virginia State University. The school remained in operation from the late 1880s through the early 1900s.

After Campbell and Jones had completed 8th grade, they went on to complete their secondary education at Pomeroy Academy. They became the first 1882 (Jones) and in 1884 the second (Campbell) people of color to graduate from Pomeroy Academy, while segregation still plagued the United States.

In 1876, The Pomeroy Academy stood next to the Episcopal Church, and still later became the Pomeroy High School. Pomeroy Academies' first graduating class consisted of six students. In 1914 a new building was erected and served as the Senior High Building through 1967. In 1929 a Junior High School was built nearby.

In 1920 there were four grade schools, Viz, Sugar Run, Central, Coalport and Kerr’s Run, and all were integrated schools. Later Rutland, Middleport, and Pomeroy were consolidated as Meigs High School at Rock Springs.

=== Churches ===
Churches were established as people came to the county, and in Pomeroy included German and Welsh; also, two churches for black people, one at Kerr’s Run, the other on Lincoln Hill. The original buildings have all been removed and new edifices built, and several new denominations have been added.

=== Natural disasters ===
Fires and floods were, and still are, a frequent enemy in Pomeroy. All the old wooden buildings were destroyed by fires of 1851, 1856, 1884, and 1927. Another in 1976 took the entire Red Anchor store, which had been in existence since the late 1800s. The floods of 1884, 1913, and 1937 were most disastrous.

=== Other attributes ===
The Pomeroy, Ohio McDonald's location was one of the last two McDonald's locations in the world that still served pizza. This location served its final pizza on August 31, 2017. McDonald's phased out pizzas at its stores in the late 1990s.

The courthouse has the distinction of being mentioned in "Ripley's Believe or Not!" because there is a ground-floor entrance to each of its three stories. It also served as a temporary jail for more than 200 of Morgan’s Raid after their capture in the Battle of Buffington Island.

Pomeroy is mentioned in "Ripley's" a second time for not having any cross streets.

== Geography ==
According to the United States Census Bureau, the village has a total area of 3.31 square miles (8.57 km^{2}), of which 3.25 square miles (8.42 km^{2}) is land and 0.06 square miles (0.16 km^{2}) is water.

== Demographics ==
Historical population
Census	Pop.	Note	%±
1840	388		—
1850	1,638		322.2%
1860	6,480		295.6%
1870	5,824		−10.1%
1880	5,560		−4.5%
1890	4,726		−15.0%
1900	4,639		−1.8%
1910	4,023		−13.3%
1920	4,294		6.7%
1930	3,563		−17.0%
1940	3,581		0.5%
1950	3,656		2.1%
1960	3,345		−8.5%
1970	2,672		−20.1%
1980	2,728		2.1%
1990	2,259		−17.2%
2000	1,966		−13.0%
2010	1,852		−5.8%
2020	1,573		−15.1%
U.S. Decennial Census

=== 2010 census ===
As of the census of 2010, there were 1,852 people, 757 households, and 483 families living in the village. The population density was 569.8 inhabitants per square mile (220.0/km^{2}). There were 933 housing units at an average density of 287.1 per square mile (110.8/km^{2}). The racial makeup of the village was 94.3% White, 2.7% African American, 0.5% Native American, 0.1% Asian, and 2.3% from two or more races. Hispanic or Latino of any race were 0.5% of the population.

There were 757 households, of which 34.6% had children under the age of 18 living with them, 37.0% were married couples living together, 20.2% had a female householder with no husband present, 6.6% had a male householder with no wife present, and 36.2% were non-families. 29.1% of all households were made up of individuals, and 12.8% had someone living alone who was 65 years of age or older. The average household size was 2.44 and the average family size was 2.99.

The median age in the village was 35.2 years. 27% of residents were under the age of 18; 10.5% were between the ages of 18 and 24; 23.8% were from 25 to 44; 25.1% were from 45 to 64; and 13.4% were 65 years of age or older. The gender makeup of the village was 45.8% male and 54.2% female.

=== 2000 census ===
As of the census of 2000, there were 1,966 people, 835 households, and 516 families living in the village. The population density was 607.5 inhabitants per square mile (234.6/km^{2}). There were 1,041 housing units at an average density of 321.7 per square mile (124.2/km^{2}). The racial makeup of the village was 94.91% White, 2.14% African American, 0.41% Native American, 0.10% Asian, 0.10% from other races, and 2.34% from two or more races. Hispanic or Latino of any race were 0.25% of the population.

There were 835 households, out of which 30.8% had children under the age of 18 living with them, 38.3% were married couples living together, 17.6% had a female householder with no husband present, and 38.1% were non-families. 34.5% of all households were made up of individuals, and 16.4% had someone living alone who was 65 years of age or older. The average household size was 2.32 and the average family size was 2.95.

In the village, the population was spread out, with 25.4% under the age of 18, 10.6% from 18 to 24, 26.7% from 25 to 44, 21.2% from 45 to 64, and 16.2% who were 65 years of age or older. The median age was 36 years. For every 100 females, there were 78.2 males. For every 100 females age 18 and over, there were 78.5 males.

The median income for a household in the village was $19,971, and the median income for a family was $22,406. Males had a median income of $30,625 versus $20,093 for females. The per capita income for the village was $11,305. About 35.4% of families and 39.2% of the population were below the poverty line, including 61.8% of those under age 18 and 18.7% of those age 65 or over.

== Education ==
Public education in the village of Pomeroy is provided by the Meigs Local School District. Campuses serving the village include Meigs Primary School (Grades K-2), Meigs Intermediate School (Grades 3–5), Meigs Middle School (Grades 6–8), and Meigs High School (Grades 9–12).

Pomeroy has a public library, a branch of the Meigs County District Public Library.

== Notable people ==
- Mike Bartrum, an NFL long snapper/tight end
- Ambrose Bierce, American journalist, short story writer, and satirist
- James Edwin Campbell, a poet, writer and educator
- Norman "Kid" Elberfeld, a Major League Baseball shortstop and manager
- Samuel Dana Horton, a bimetallism writer
- Valentine B. Horton, U.S. Representative during the American Civil War
- Joseph Jessing, founder of the Pontifical College Josephinum in Columbus, Ohio
- Benny Kauff, Major League Baseball player
- Jorma Kaukonen, 1996 inductee of the Rock & Roll Hall of Fame
- Art Lewis, an NFL player and coach
- Cy Morgan, a Major League Baseball pitcher
- Tobias A. Plants, U.S. Representative, and publisher of Pomeroy Weekly Telegraph
- Livia Simpson Poffenbarger, newspaper owner/editor, civic leader
- Charlie Slack, NCAA basketball record holder for single-season rebounding average

== See also ==
- List of cities and towns along the Ohio River
