= Lee Township, Athens County, Ohio =

Township in Ohio, US

- Township
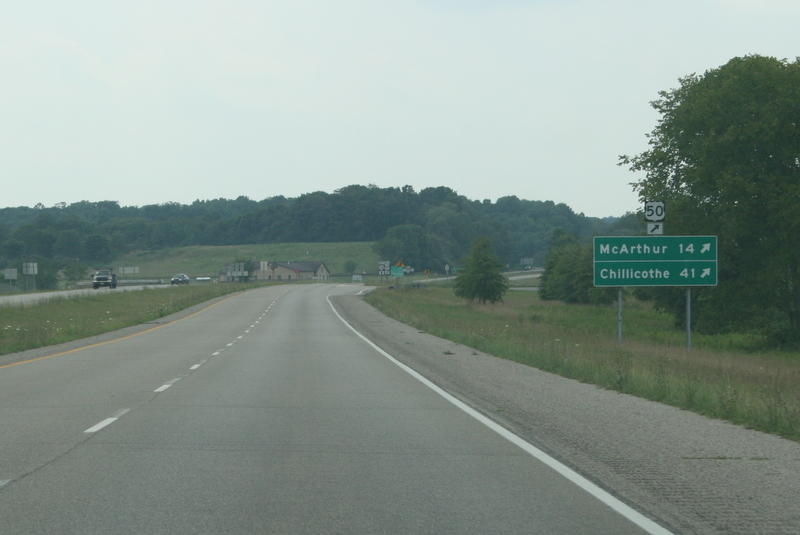
- Along the concurrent U.S. Route 50 and State Route 32 in southern Lee Township

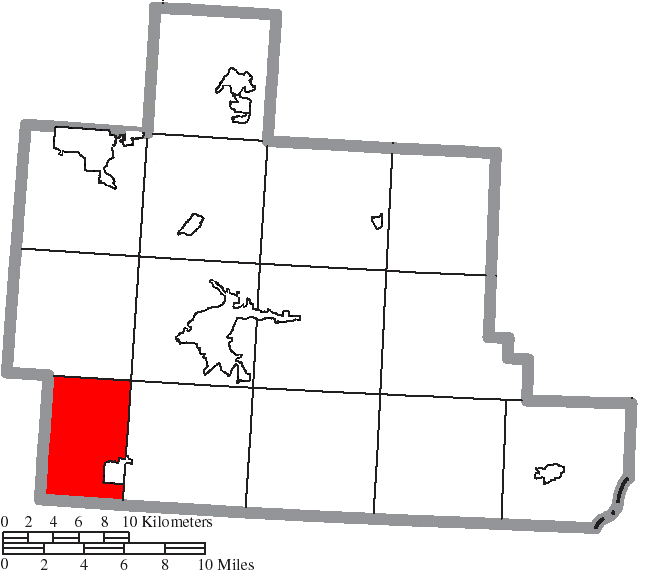
- Location of Lee Township in Athens County
- Coordinates: 39°14′23″N 82°13′12″W
- Country: United States
- State: Ohio
- County: Athens

Area
  - Total: 25.3 sq mi (65.5 km^{2})
  - Land: 24.9 sq mi (64.5 km^{2})
  - Water: 0.39 sq mi (1.0 km^{2})
- Elevation: 781 ft (238 m)

Population (2020)
  - Total: 2,837
  - Density: 114/sq mi (44.0/km^{2})
- Time zone: UTC-5 (Eastern (EST))
  - Summer (DST): UTC-4 (EDT)
- FIPS code: 39-42420
- GNIS feature ID: 1085755

Lee Township is one of the fourteen townships of Athens County, Ohio, United States. The 2020 census found 2,837 people in the township.

== Geography ==
Located in the southwestern corner of the county, it borders the following townships:

- Waterloo Township - north
- Athens Township - northeast corner
- Alexander Township - east
- Scipio Township, Meigs County - southeast corner
- Columbia Township, Meigs County - south
- Knox Township, Vinton County - west

Most of the village of Albany is located in southeastern Lee Township.

== Name and history ==
Lee Township was organized in 1819.

Statewide, other Lee Townships are located in Carroll and Monroe counties.

== Government ==
The township is governed by a three-member board of trustees, who are elected in November of odd-numbered years to a four-year term beginning on the following January 1. Two are elected in the year after the presidential election and one is elected in the year before it. There is also an elected township fiscal officer, who serves a four-year term beginning on April 1 of the year after the election, which is held in November of the year before the presidential election. Vacancies in the fiscal officership or on the board of trustees are filled by the remaining trustees.
