= Rutland Township, Meigs County, Ohio =

Township in Ohio, US

- Township
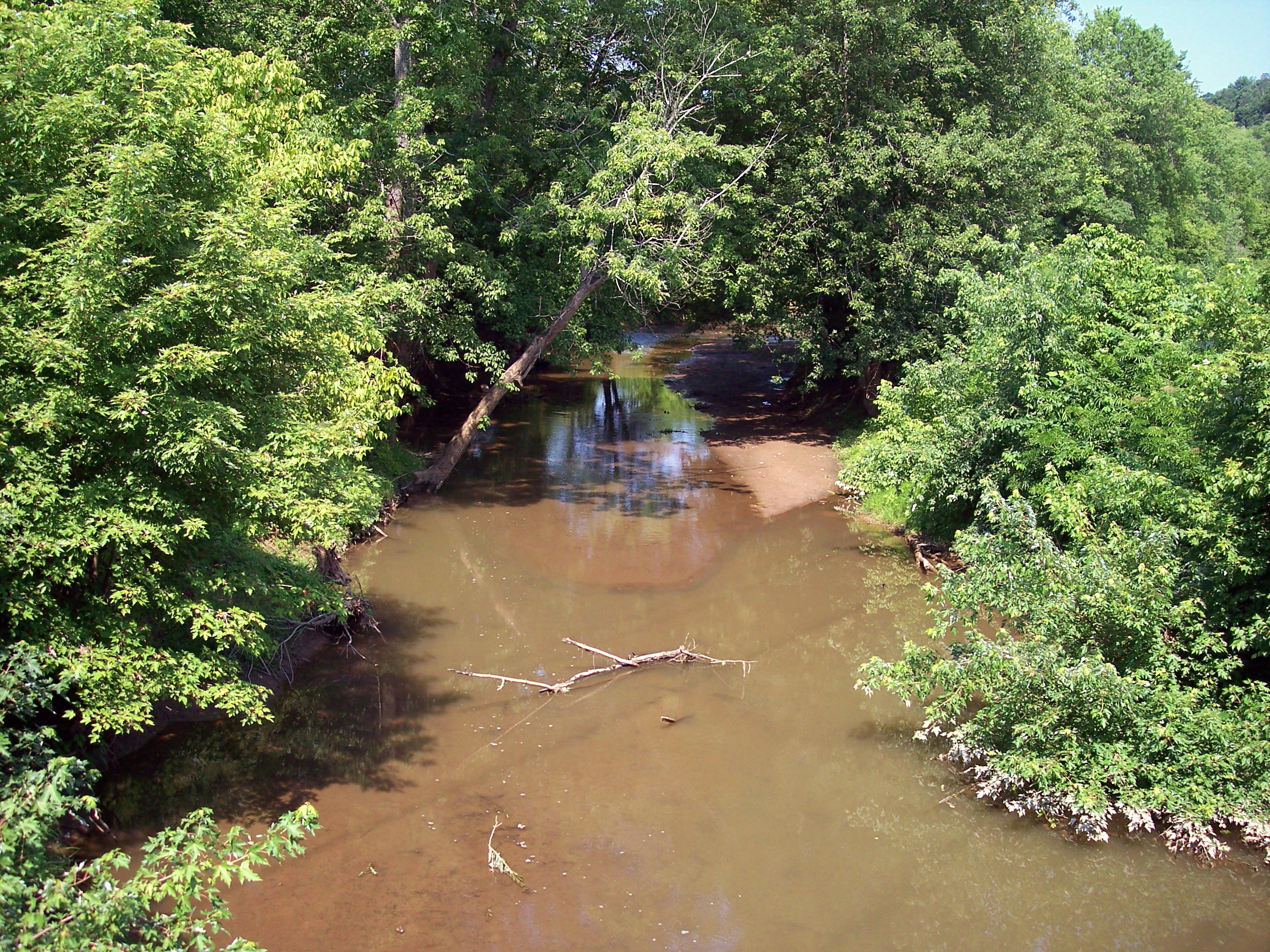
- Leading Creek

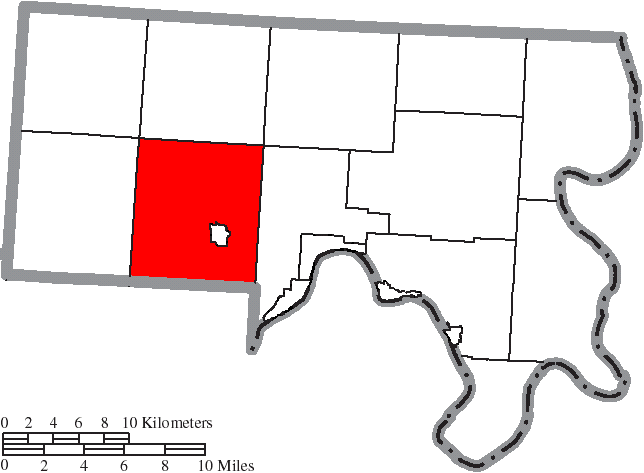
- Location of Rutland Township in Meigs County
- Coordinates: 39°2′42″N 82°9′16″W
- Country: United States
- State: Ohio
- County: Meigs

Area
  - Total: 44.0 sq mi (113.9 km^{2})
  - Land: 44.0 sq mi (113.9 km^{2})
  - Water: 0 sq mi (0.0 km^{2})
- Elevation: 873 ft (266 m)

Population (2020)
  - Total: 2,137
  - Density: 48.59/sq mi (18.76/km^{2})
- Time zone: UTC-5 (Eastern (EST))
  - Summer (DST): UTC-4 (EDT)
- ZIP code: 45775
- Area code: 740
- FIPS code: 39-69372
- GNIS feature ID: 1086615

Rutland Township is one of the twelve townships of Meigs County, Ohio, United States. The 2020 census found 2,137 people in the township.

== Geography ==
Located in the western part of the county, it borders the following townships:

- Scipio Township - north
- Bedford Township - northeast corner
- Salisbury Township - east
- Cheshire Township, Gallia County - south
- Morgan Township, Gallia County - southwest
- Salem Township - west
- Columbia Township - northwest corner

Two populated places are located in Rutland Township: the village of Rutland, the smallest village in Meigs County, in the center; and the unincorporated community of Langsville, in the center, a short distance west of Rutland.

== Name and history ==
Rutland Township was partitioned from Salisbury Township and organized in 1812 as part of Gallia County, prior to the formation of Meigs County in 1819. It is the only Rutland Township statewide.

The formation of Rutland Township was due to local population growth rather than the onset of the War of 1812. However, Rutland Township and its parent county were heavily connected to the war effort in several ways. After the failure of a military draft, General Edward W. Tupper of Gallia County raised a brigade of 1,000 volunteers from Gallia, Jackson, and Lawrence counties to fight in the Northwest campaign against the British and their Native American allies. Prominent local settlers and pioneers from Rutland Township actively enlisted or were drafted into the conflict, serving on the frontier and near Lake Erie. Only two surviving veterans of the Army of the Northwest resided in Rutland Township in 1876: John Woodard (a Virginian who joined Capt. James Paxton's Co., 12th Infantry and later settled in Ohio) and Elihu Higley (26 Nov 1788 – 23 April 1877; a local man with extended familial ties to the township and region).

== Government ==
The township is governed by a three-member board of trustees, who are elected in November of odd-numbered years to a four-year term beginning on the following January 1. Two are elected in the year after the presidential election and one is elected in the year before it. There is also an elected township fiscal officer, who serves a four-year term beginning on April 1 of the year after the election, which is held in November of the year before the presidential election. Vacancies in the fiscal officership or on the board of trustees are filled by the remaining trustees.
