= Columbia Township, Meigs County, Ohio =

Township in Ohio, US

- Township
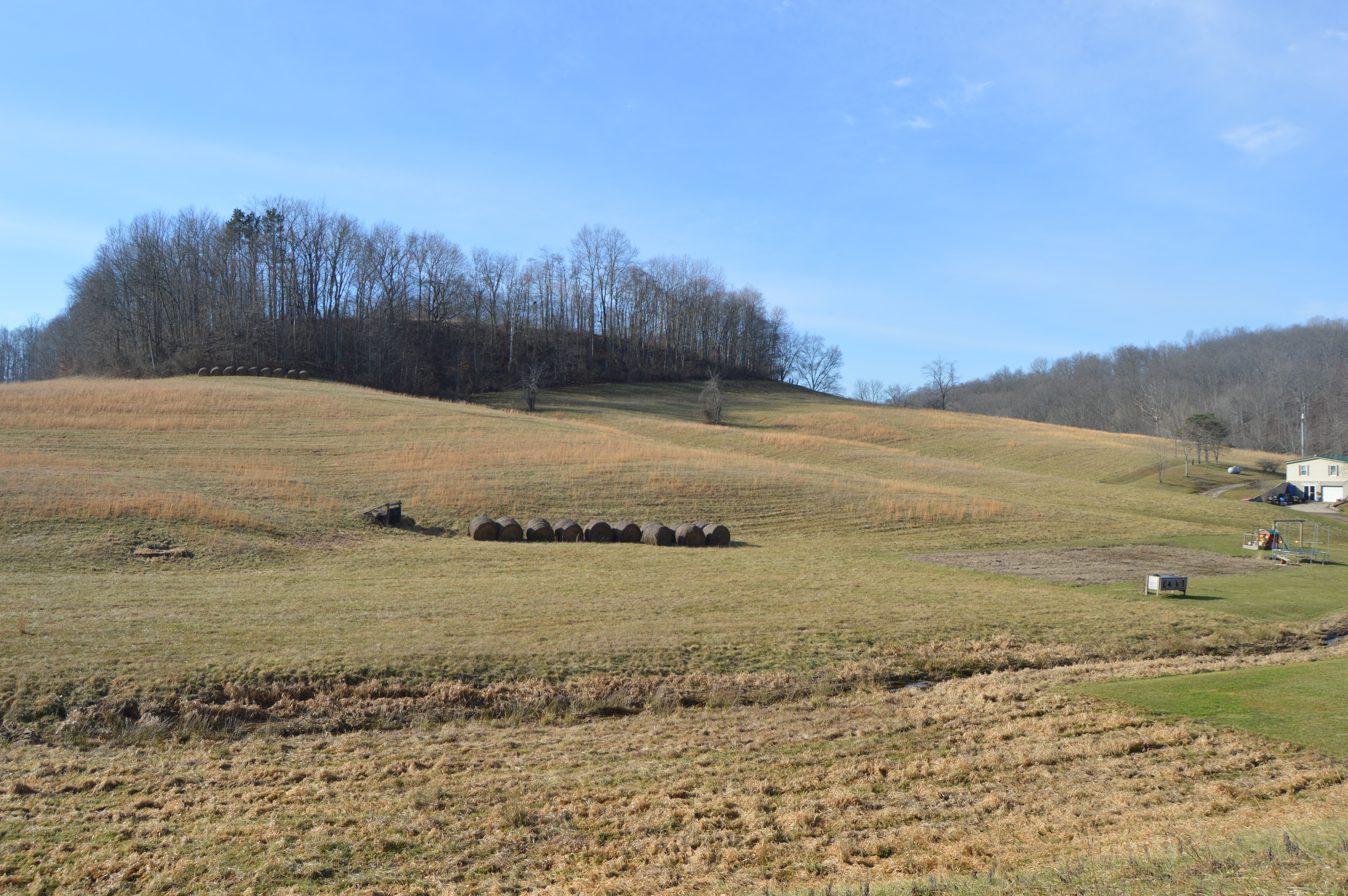
- Fields on Run Road

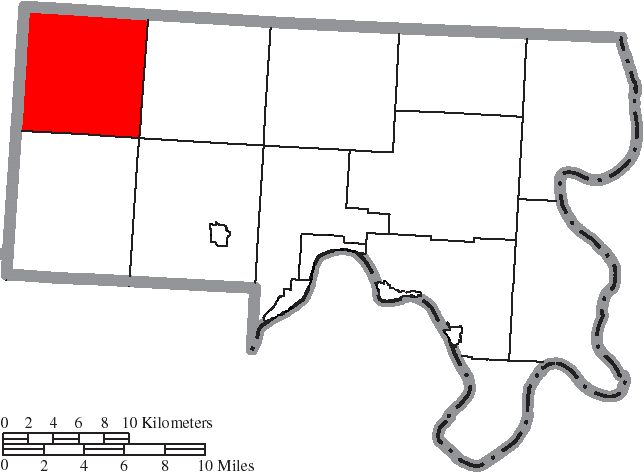
- Location of Columbia Township in Meigs County
- Coordinates: 39°9′11″N 82°14′38″W
- Country: United States
- State: Ohio
- County: Meigs

Area
  - Total: 37.6 sq mi (97.4 km^{2})
  - Land: 37.6 sq mi (97.4 km^{2})
  - Water: 0 sq mi (0.0 km^{2})
- Elevation: 630 ft (192 m)

Population (2020)
  - Total: 1,220
  - Density: 32.4/sq mi (12.5/km^{2})
- Time zone: UTC-5 (Eastern (EST))
  - Summer (DST): UTC-4 (EDT)
- FIPS code: 39-16924
- GNIS feature ID: 1086610

Columbia Township is one of the twelve townships of Meigs County, Ohio, United States. The 2020 census found 1,220 people in the township.

== Geography ==
Located in the northwestern corner of the county, it borders the following townships:

- Lee Township, Athens County - north
- Alexander Township, Athens County - northeast corner
- Scipio Township - east
- Rutland Township - southeast corner
- Salem Township - south
- Wilkesville Township, Vinton County - southwest corner
- Vinton Township, Vinton County - west
- Knox Township, Vinton County - northwest

No municipalities are located in Columbia Township.

== Name and history ==
Statewide, other Columbia Townships are located in Hamilton and Lorain counties.

== Government ==
The township is governed by a three-member board of trustees, who are elected in November of odd-numbered years to a four-year term beginning on the following January 1. Two are elected in the year after the presidential election and one is elected in the year before it. There is also an elected township fiscal officer, who serves a four-year term beginning on April 1 of the year after the election, which is held in November of the year before the presidential election. Vacancies in the fiscal officership or on the board of trustees are filled by the remaining trustees.
