= Scipio Township, Meigs County, Ohio =

Township in Ohio, US

- Township
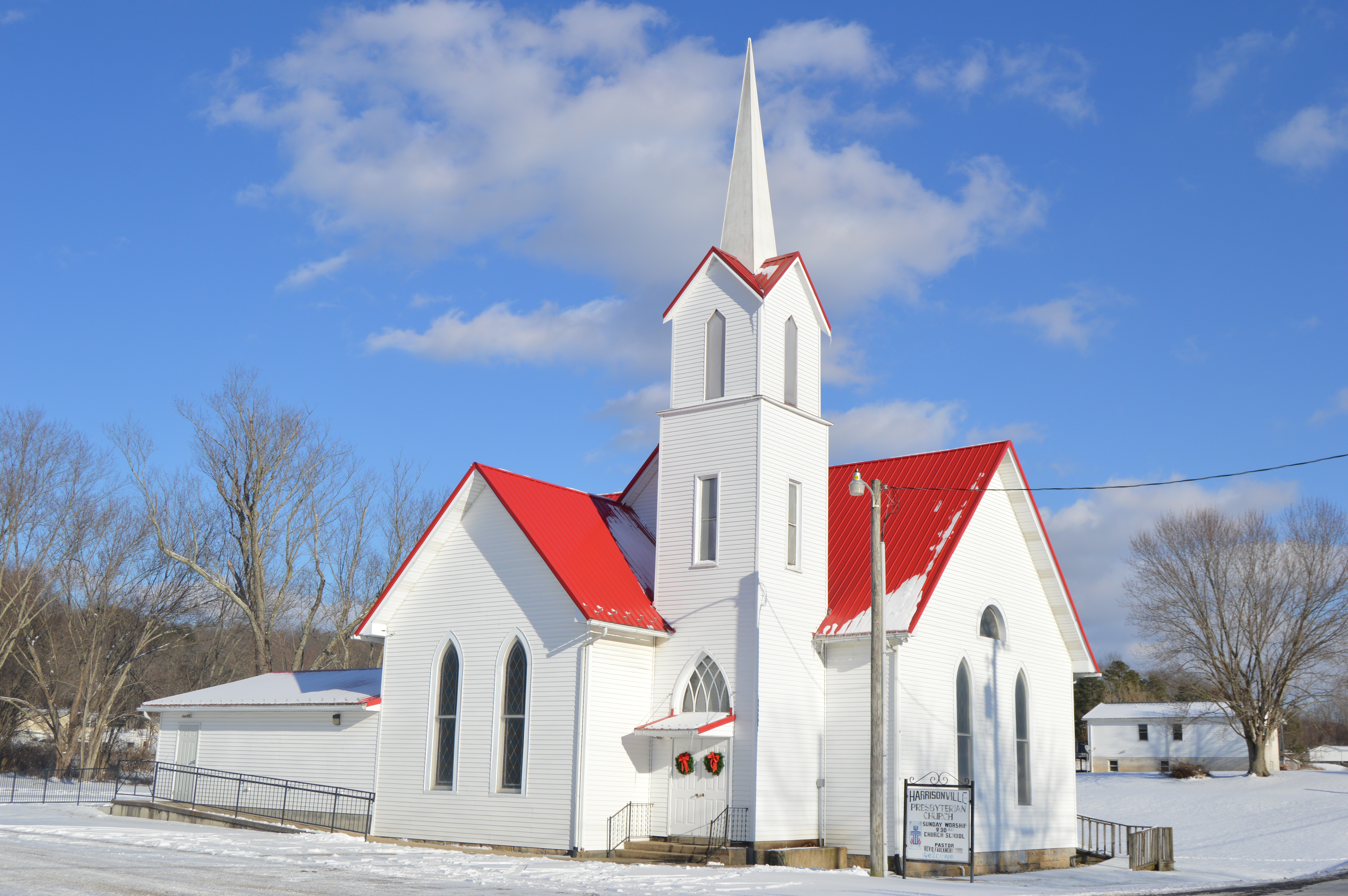
- Harrisonville Presbyterian Church on State Route 143

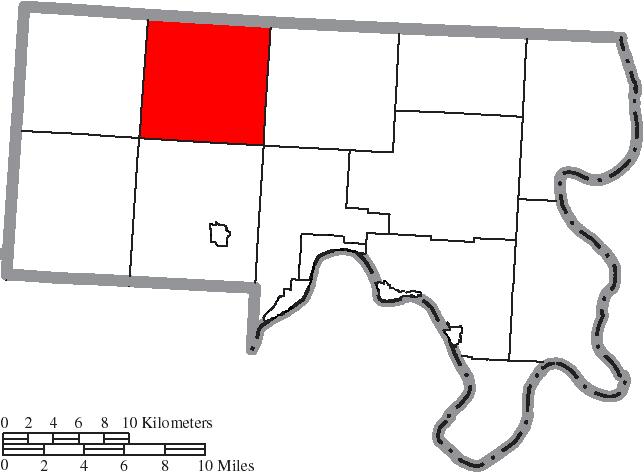
- Location of Scipio Township in Meigs County
- Coordinates: 39°9′49″N 82°8′12″W
- Country: United States
- State: Ohio
- County: Meigs

Area
  - Total: 37.5 sq mi (97.0 km^{2})
  - Land: 37.5 sq mi (97.0 km^{2})
  - Water: 0 sq mi (0.0 km^{2})
- Elevation: 846 ft (258 m)

Population (2020)
  - Total: 1,213
  - Density: 32.4/sq mi (12.5/km^{2})
- Time zone: UTC-5 (Eastern (EST))
  - Summer (DST): UTC-4 (EDT)
- FIPS code: 39-70996
- GNIS feature ID: 1086618

Scipio Township is one of the twelve townships of Meigs County, Ohio, United States. The 2020 census found 1,213 people in the township.

== Geography ==
Located in the northwestern part of the county, it borders the following townships:

- Alexander Township, Athens County - north
- Lodi Township, Athens County - northeast corner
- Bedford Township - east
- Salisbury Township - southeast corner
- Rutland Township - south
- Salem Township - southwest corner
- Columbia Township - west
- Lee Township, Athens County - northwest corner

No municipalities are located in Scipio Township.

== Name and history ==
Statewide, the only other Scipio Township is located in Seneca County.

== Government ==
The township is governed by a three-member board of trustees, who are elected in November of odd-numbered years to a four-year term beginning on the following January 1. Two are elected in the year after the presidential election and one is elected in the year before it. There is also an elected township fiscal officer, who serves a four-year term beginning on April 1 of the year after the election, which is held in November of the year before the presidential election. Vacancies in the fiscal officership or on the board of trustees are filled by the remaining trustees.
