= Salem Township, Meigs County, Ohio =

Township in Ohio, US

- Township
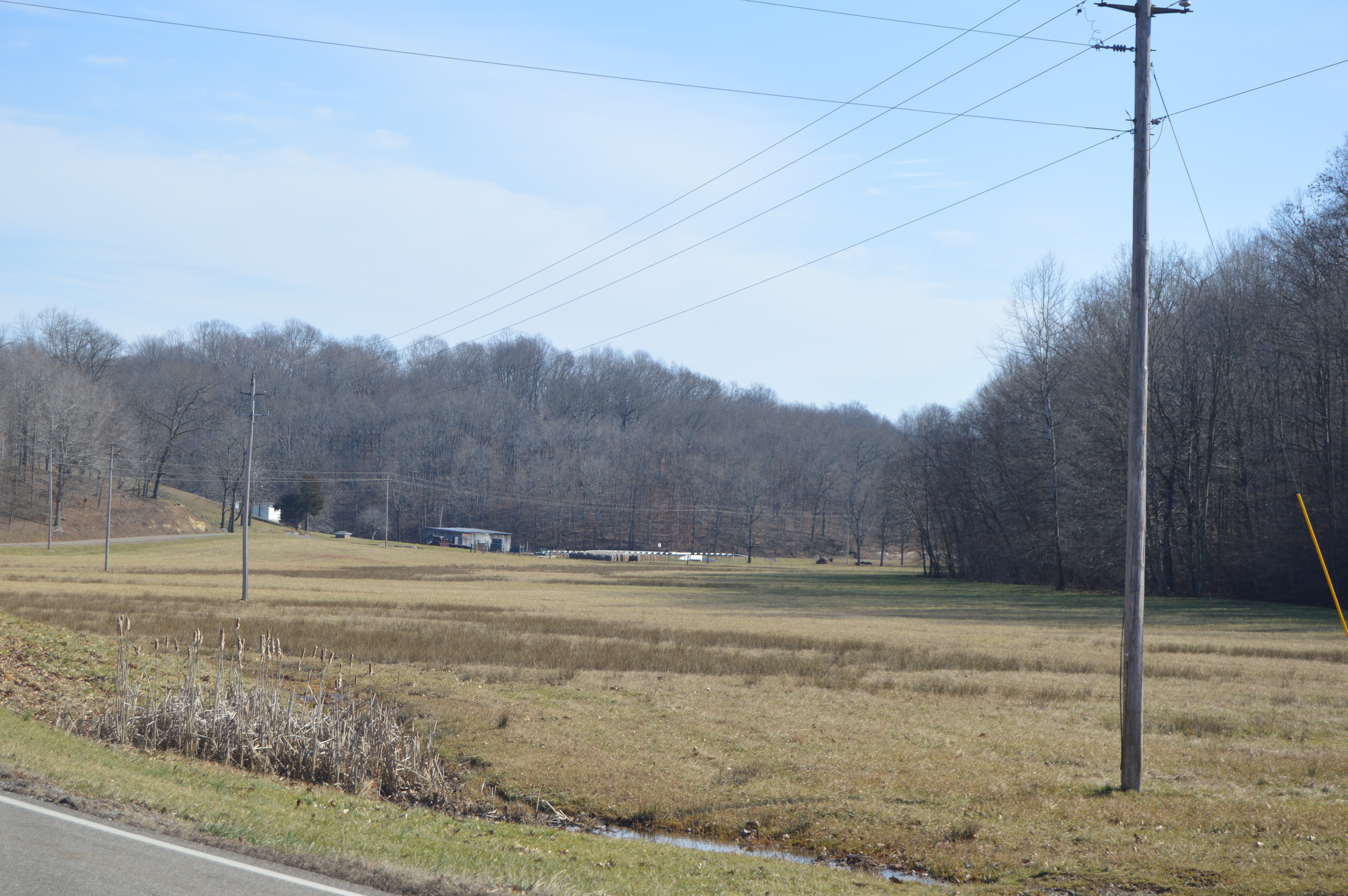
- Along State Route 325 in the township's far south

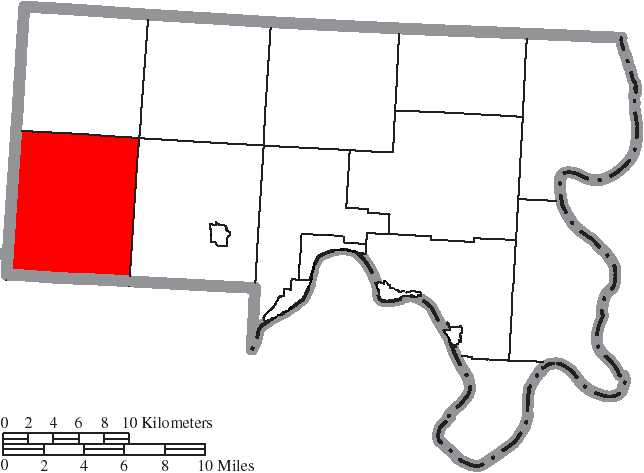
- Location of Salem Township in Meigs County
- Coordinates: 39°4′25″N 82°14′38″W
- Country: United States
- State: Ohio
- County: Meigs

Area
  - Total: 43.5 sq mi (112.7 km^{2})
  - Land: 43.5 sq mi (112.7 km^{2})
  - Water: 0 sq mi (0.0 km^{2})
- Elevation: 735 ft (224 m)

Population (2020)
  - Total: 939
  - Density: 21.6/sq mi (8.33/km^{2})
- Time zone: UTC-5 (Eastern (EST))
  - Summer (DST): UTC-4 (EDT)
- FIPS code: 39-69904
- GNIS feature ID: 1086616

Salem Township is one of the twelve townships of Meigs County, Ohio, United States. The 2020 census found 939 people in the township.

== Geography ==
Located in the southwestern corner of the county, it borders the following townships:

- Columbia Township - north
- Scipio Township - northeast corner
- Rutland Township - east
- Cheshire Township, Gallia County - southeast corner
- Morgan Township, Gallia County - south
- Huntington Township, Gallia County - southwest
- Wilkesville Township, Vinton County - west
- Vinton Township, Vinton County - northwest corner

No municipalities are located in Salem Township.

== Name and history ==
It is one of fourteen Salem Townships statewide.

== Government ==
The township is governed by a three-member board of trustees, who are elected in November of odd-numbered years to a four-year term beginning on the following January 1. Two are elected in the year after the presidential election and one is elected in the year before it. There is also an elected township fiscal officer, who serves a four-year term beginning on April 1 of the year after the election, which is held in November of the year before the presidential election. Vacancies in the fiscal officership or on the board of trustees are filled by the remaining trustees.
