= Meigs High School =

Location
- 42091 Pomeroy Pike; Pomeroy, (Meigs County), Ohio 45769; United States
- Coordinates: 39°03′19″N 82°00′37″W

Information
- Type: Public, Coeducational high school
- Superintendent: Scot Gheen
- Principal: Michael Chancey
- Grades: 9-12
- Enrollment: 518 (2023-24)
- Colors: Maroon & Gold
- Slogan: "Where Excellence Begins"
- Fight song: Maroon & Gold
- Athletics conference: Tri-Valley Conference
- Nickname: The Marauders
- Athletic Director: Kevin Musser
- Website: https://mhs.meigslocal.org

Meigs High School is a public high school in Pomeroy, Ohio, United States. It is one of four high schools in Meigs County. The school mascot is the Marauders. Meigs High School is the creation of several school districts within Meigs County including Middleport, Pomeroy, Bedford, Northwestern, and Salem. Consolidation took place between the years 1965 and 1967 with construction of the new school beginning in the summer of 1968. The current school opened in 1970, and is still in use today.

== Athletics ==
The Marauders belong to the Ohio High School Athletic Association (OHSAA) and the Tri-Valley Conference, a 13-member athletic conference located in southeastern Ohio. The conference is divided into two divisions based on school size. The Ohio Division features the larger schools, including Meigs, and the Hocking Division features the smaller schools. Meigs High School is the only high school within a 100-mile radius to have random drug testing.

In its first year of participation as the Marauders, Meigs won the SEOAL Football Championship with a 9-1 record. Their only loss that year was an 8-0 setback to powerhouse Ironton. The Marauders have won five total football championships. (1967, 1986, 1987, 1996, 1998) The 1986 team holds the distinction as being the only team in school history to complete a season undefeated at 10-0.

=== Ohio High School Athletic Association State Championships ===
- Boys Baseball – 1957*

*Title won by Middleport High School prior to consolidation into Meigs High School.

=== Meigs Marauder Music Program ===
Marching Shows and Awards

- 1998 - Magical Mystery Tour
- 1999 - Big Bad VooDoo Daddy, which won Grand Champion in 1999 in the Tri-State Marching Band Festival competition at Marshall University.
- 2005 - Paul Simon Show
- 2006 - Music Of Ray Charles
- 2007 - Jazz N' Blues featuring Moonlight Serenade, Take the "A" Train, Sing, Sing, Sing, Blues In The Night.
- 2008 - Rocks This Town featuring Rock This Town, Sing Sang Sung, and Big Noise From Winnetka.
- 2009 - Marauders Go To Birdland featuring Birdland, It Don't Mean A Thing (If It Ain't Got That Swing), and Swing Swing Swing.
- 2010 - Ellington In Motion featuring Take the "A" Train, Satin Doll, Caravan, and It Don't Mean A Thing (If It Ain't Got That Swing).
- 2013 - Music of the Beatles, which won Grand Champion at Marietta, Ohio in 2013.

Notable Appearances

- 2014 - The Marauder band participated in the Memorial Day Parade in Washington, DC in May.

== Notable alumni ==
- Bethany Williams, Playboy centerfold model
- Mike Bartrum, former American football long snapper and tight end in the National Football League, played for the Philadelphia Eagles.

== See also ==
- Ohio High School Athletic Conferences
