= List of place names of Polish origin in the United States =

Several dozen place names in the United States have names of Polish origin, most a legacy of Polish immigration to the United States. Others were named after Polish-American heroes, such as Casimir Pulaski or Tadeusz Kościusko. Many places which were settled by Polish immigrants named their towns after the cities they had immigrated from in what was then Polish-Lithuanian Commonwealth.

== Alaska ==
- (pol.) Góra Krzyżanowskiego, a peak named in honor of Włodzimierz Krzyżanowski. Name given by Polish geographer Stefan Jarosz.
- (pol.) Jezioro Piłsudskiego, a lake on Kosciusko Island named in honor of Józef Piłsudski - Polish politician, First Marshall and Prime Minister. Name given by Polish geographer Stefan Jarosz.
- Kosciusko Island, named in honor of Tadeusz Kosciuszko, Polish and American military leader.
- (pol.) Lodowiec Romera on Mount Saint Elias, a glacier named in honor of Eugeniusz Romer - distinguished Polish geographer, cartographer and geopolitician.
- (pol.) Rzeka Kosarzewskiego, a river named in honor of a Polish noble man with the surname Kosarzewski.
- Zarembo Island, named after Dionysius Zarembo, a Polish employee of the Russian American Company and explorer of Alaska.

== Alabama ==
- Warsaw, named after the capital city of Poland - Warsaw (pol. Warszawa).

== Arkansas ==
- Boles (pol. Boleś), name created from a diminution of a Polish male name Bolesław.
- Pulaski Heights, named after Casimir Pulaski a Polish nobleman and general in American Revolutionary War

== California ==
- Modjeska, a street in Irvine named in honor of Helena Modjeska.
- Modjeska Canyon and Modjeska Canyon Rd, named in honor of Helena Modjeska.
- Modjeska Park in Anaheim, named in honor of Helena Modjeska.
- Modjeska Peak in Santa Ana Mountains, named in honor of Helena Modjeska.
- Modjeska Peak Lane in Lake Forest, named in honor of Helena Modjeska.
- Mount Bielawski or Mount Bielewski (pol. Góra Bielawskiego) in the Santa Cruz Mountains, a peak named in honor of Casimir Bielawski.
- Stanislaus National Forest (pol. Narodowy Las Stanisława), named after Stanislaus River
- Stanislaus Peak (pol. Szczyt Stanisława), named after Stanislaus River
- Stanislaus River (pol. Rzeka Stanisława), named after Chief Estanislao (who was named after St. Stanislaus, a patron saint of Poland).
- Zaborowski View Point and Parking (pol. Punkt Widokowy Zaborowskiego i Parking Zaborowskiego), the name comes from a Polish noble, male surname Zaborowski.

== Florida ==
- Pulaski Shoal, an underwater landform west of the Florida Keys, named after Casimir Pulaski a Polish nobleman and general in American Revolutionary War.

== Georgia ==
- Pulaski, named after Casimir Pulaski a Polish nobleman and general in American Revolutionary War.
- Pulaski Square in Savannah, named after Casimir Pulaski a Polish nobleman and general in American Revolutionary War.
- Pulaski State Prison, named after Casimir Pulaski a Polish nobleman and general in American Revolutionary War.
- Waleska, the name comes from a Polish noble female surname Walewska.
- Warsaw, named after the capital city of Poland - Warsaw (pol. Warszawa).

== Idaho ==
- Pulaski Tunnel, named after Casimir Pulaski a Polish nobleman and general in American Revolutionary War.

== Illinois ==
- Cissna Park, formerly Cisne, named after a Polish man, Mr. Wm. Cissna who owned many acres in this vicinity.
- Jackowo (Avondale) - a neighborhood of Chicago. Its name comes from a Polish male name Jacek (Jack).
- (pol.) Kalisz, a place named after Kalisz, Poland.
- Mount Pulaski, named after Casimir Pulaski a Polish nobleman and general in American Revolutionary War.
- Mount Pulaski Township, named after Casimir Pulaski a Polish nobleman and general in American Revolutionary War.
- Posen, named after Poznań, Poland.
- Pulaski, a village named after Casimir Pulaski a Polish nobleman and general in American Revolutionary War.
- Pulaski Road, named after Casimir Pulaski a Polish nobleman and general in American Revolutionary War.
- Radom, named after Radom, Poland.
- Warsaw, named after the capital city of Poland - Warsaw (pol. Warszawa).
- Warsaw Township, named after the capital city of Poland - Warsaw (pol. Warszawa).

== Indiana ==
- Jasper-Pulaski Fish and Wildlife Area, named after Casimir Pulaski a Polish nobleman and general in American Revolutionary War.
- Kosciusko County, named after Tadeusz Kościusko - Polish and American military leader.
- Poland, named after Republic of Poland (pol. Polska).
- Pulaski, named after Casimir Pulaski a Polish nobleman and general in American Revolutionary War.
- Vistula, named after the biggest river of Poland - Vistula (pol. Wisła).
- Warsaw, named after the capital city of Poland - Warsaw (pol. Warszawa). Warsaw has streets named in honour of Józef Piłsudski and Albrycht Zaborowski.

== Iowa ==
- Poland Township, named after Republic of Poland (pol. Polska).
- Pulaski, named after Casimir Pulaski a Polish nobleman and general in American Revolutionary War.

== Kansas ==
- Elbing, named after Elbląg.

== Kentucky ==
- Warsaw, named after the capital city of Poland - Warsaw (pol. Warszawa).

== Louisiana ==
- Chopin, named after Frédéric Chopin, Polish composer and pianist.

== Maine ==
- Poland, named after a song.

== Maryland ==
- New Glatz, (pol. Kłodzko, ger. Glatz).
- North Pulaski Street and South Pulaski Street in Baltimore, named after Casimir Pulaski a Polish nobleman and general in American Revolutionary War.

== Michigan ==
- Posen, named after Poznań, Poland.
- Sandusky, formerly Sadowski, named after Polish surname Sadowski.

== Minnesota ==
- Florian, name created from a Polish male name Florian.
- Gnesen Township, named after Gniezno, Poland.
- Lake Julia (pol. Jezioro Julia).
- Lake Pulaski, named after Casimir Pulaski a Polish nobleman and general in American Revolutionary War.
- Opole, named after Opole, Poland.
- Puposky, named after surname Pupowski.
- Puposky Lake, named after surname Pupowski.
- Sobieski, named after John III Sobieski.
- Warsaw, named after the capital city of Poland - Warsaw (pol. Warszawa).
- Warsaw Township (Goodhue County), named after the capital city of Poland - Warsaw (pol. Warszawa).
- Warsaw Township (Rice County), named after the capital city of Poland - Warsaw (pol. Warszawa).

== Mississippi ==
- Kosciusko, named after Tadeusz Kościusko - Polish and American military leader.
- Pulaski, named after Casimir Pulaski a Polish nobleman and general in American Revolutionary War.

== Missouri ==
- Bem (pol. Osada Bem), named in honor Polish engineer and general Józef Bem.
- Boles (pol. Boleś), name created from a diminutive of a Polish male name Bolesław.
- Friedheim, (pol. Miasteczko Krajeńskie, ger. Friedheim).
- Pulaski, named after Casimir Pulaski a Polish nobleman and general in American Revolutionary War.
- Warsaw, named after the capital city of Poland - Warsaw (pol. Warszawa).

== Montana ==
- (pol.) Landurski, a place in Montana named after Polish surname of Landurski.
- (pol.) Śląsk, named after Silesia, Poland.

== Nebraska ==
- Tarnov, named after Tarnów, Poland.

== New Jersey ==
- Pulaski Skyway in Jersey City, named after Casimir Pulaski a Polish nobleman and general in American Revolutionary War.
- Pulaski St in Newark, named after Casimir Pulaski a general and a Polish and American war hero in American Revolutionary War.
- Zabriskie St in Jersey City, formerly Zaborowski, named for Albrycht Zaborowski, a Polish who settled in New Jersey in 1662.

== New York ==
- Kosciusko Bridge in New York City, named after Tadeusz Kościusko - Polish and American military leader.
- Kosciuszko's Garden in West Point, (pol. Ogród Kościuszki) named after Tadeusz Kościusko - Polish and American military leader.
- Poland (Chautauqua County), named after Republic of Poland (pol. Polska).
- Poland, (Herkimer County), named after Republic of Poland (pol. Polska).
- Polish Center in Riverhead with Pulaski St
- Pulaski, named after Casimir Pulaski a Polish nobleman and general in American Revolutionary War.
- Thaddeus Kosciusko Bridge in New York City, named after Tadeusz Kościusko - Polish and American military leader.
- Warsaw, named after the capital city of Poland - Warsaw (pol. Warszawa).
- Warsaw (village), named after the capital city of Poland - Warsaw (pol. Warszawa).

== North Carolina ==
- Warsaw, named after the capital city of Poland - Warsaw (pol. Warszawa).

== North Dakota ==
- Danzig, (pol. Gdańsk, ger. Danzig)
- Warsaw, named after the capital city of Poland - Warsaw (pol. Warszawa).

== Ohio ==
- Poland, (named after a person).
- Poland Township, named after Republic of Poland (pol. Polska).
- Pulaski, named after Casimir Pulaski a Polish nobleman and general in American Revolutionary War.
- Pulaskiville, named after Casimir Pulaski a Polish nobleman and general in American Revolutionary War.
- Sandusky Bay, named after polish surname Sadowski.
- Sandusky Cemetery in Sandusky, (pol. Cmentarz Sadowskiego) named after Polish surname Sadowski.
- Sandusky City, formerly Sadowski, named after Polish surname Sadowski.
- Sandusky County, formerly Sadowski, named after Polish surname Sadowski.
- Sandusky River, named after male Polish noble surname Sadowski.
- Sandusky Township, Richland County, Ohio, formerly Sadowski, named after Polish surname Sadowski.
- Vistula, a former town in what is now the city of Toledo, named after the biggest river of Poland - Vistula (pol. Wisła).
- Warsaw, named after the capital city of Poland - Warsaw (pol. Warszawa).
- Zaleski, named after Polish noble male surname Zalewski.
- Zaleski State Forest, named after Polish noble male surname Zalewski.

== Pennsylvania ==
- Mazepa, a place in Pennsylvania.
- National Shrine of Our Lady of Czestochowa in Dolyestown, named after Częstochowa, Poland (pol. "Amerykańska Częstochowa").
- Thaddeus Kosciuszko National Memorial in Philadelphia, named after Tadeusz Kościusko - Polish and American military leader.
- Warsaw, named after the capital city of Poland - Warsaw (pol. Warszawa).
- Warsaw Township, named after the capital city of Poland - Warsaw (pol. Warszawa).

== Texas ==
- Bandera City and Bandera County, bandera is a Polish word for vessel ensign.
- Breslau, named after Wrocław, Poland.
- Cestohowa, named after Częstochowa, Poland.
- Jadwiga, name created from Polish female name Jadwiga.
- Kosciusko, named after Tadeusz Kościusko - Polish and American military leader.
- Kosciusko Village, named after Tadeusz Kościusko - Polish and American military leader.
- Panna Maria, the name means Mary the Virgin (where "panna" can also mean miss).
- Warsaw, named after the capital city of Poland - Warsaw (pol. Warszawa).

== Tennessee ==
- Pulaski, named after Casimir Pulaski a Polish nobleman and general in American Revolutionary War.

== Virginia ==
- Pulaski, named after Casimir Pulaski a Polish nobleman and general in American Revolutionary War.
- Warsaw, named after the capital city of Poland - Warsaw (pol. Warszawa).

== Wisconsin ==
- Baran Park in Milwaukee
- Budsin, named after Bautzen Germany which is historically Slavic. Equivalent to Budzyń, Poland.
- Copernicus Park (neighborhood and park) in Milwaukee, named to honor Nicolaus Copernicus - Polish 15th–16th-century mathematician and astronomer.
- Crivitz - named after Crivitz Germany etymologically linked to Polabian Slavs from the Lechitic branch of the Slavic languages, to which Polish belongs.
- Dancy - named after Gdańsk.
- (pol.) Kalisz, a place named after Kalisz, Poland.
- Krakow, named after Kraków, Poland.
- Lublin, a village named after Lublin, Poland.
- Poland, named after Republic of Poland (pol. Polska).
- Poniatowski, named after Polish royal family of Poniatowski.
- Pulaski, named after Casimir Pulaski a Polish nobleman and general in American Revolutionary War.
- Stettin, named after Szczecin, Poland.
- Torun, named after Toruń, Poland.
- Zachow, named after Czachów, West Pomeranian Voivodeship, Poland.

== See also ==
- List of U.S. state name etymologies
- Lists of U.S. county name etymologies
- List of U.S. place names of Czech origin
- List of U.S. place names of French origin
- List of U.S. place names of Spanish origin
- List of non-US places that have a US place named after them
