= Sadowski =

Family name

Sadowski, Sadovsky, or Sadouski is a common Polish surname. It means "from the orchard" or "from Sadow" (i.e., from one of the towns named Sadów in Poland). Alternative spellings include the Belarusian (Садоўскі, Sadoǔski) and Lithuanian (Sadauskas) versions; as well as Sadowsky, Sodowsky, Sadovsky and Sandusky.

Sadowski is one of the many surnames associated with the Nałęcz coat-of-arms in Polish heraldry.

Language	Masculine	Feminine	Plural
Polish	Sadowski ([saˈdɔfski])	Sadowska ([saˈdɔfska])	Sadowscy ([saˈdɔfst͡sɨ])
Belarusian (Romanization)	Садоўскі (Sadoŭski)	Садоўская (Sadoŭskaja, Sadouskaya)	
Lithuanian	Sadauskas	Sadauskienė (married); Sadauskaitė (unmarried)	
Russian (Romanization)	Садовский (Sadovsky, Sadovskiy, Sadovskij)	Садовская (Sadovskaya, Sadovskaia, Sadovskaja)	
Ukrainian (Romanization)	Садовський (Sadovskyi, Sadovskyy, Sadovskyj)	Садовська (Sadovska)	

== People ==
=== Athletes ===
==== Baseball ====
- Bob Sadowski (1937–2017), an MLB third baseman
- Bob Sadowski (1938–2018), an MLB pitcher
- Clint Sodowsky (born 1972), an MLB pitcher
- Ed Sadowski (1931–1993), an MLB catcher
- Jim Sadowski (born 1951), an MLB pitcher
- Ryan Sadowski (born 1982), an MLB pitcher
- Ted Sadowski (1936–1993), an MLB pitcher

==== Other sports ====
- Ed Sadowski (1917–1990), an NBA player
- Eddie Sadowski (1915–1992), an NBL player
- Robert Sadowski, a player in the 1938 Romania national football team
- Roman Sadovsky (born 1999), Canadian figure skater
- Troy Sadowski (born 1965), an NFL player
- Zoi Sadowski-Synnott (born 2001), New Zealand snowboarder
- Jaxon Sadowski (born 2005), an American Football Player

=== Arts ===
==== Actors ====
- Fanny Sadowski (1826–1906), Italian stage actress
- Jonathan Sadowski (born 1979), an American actor
- Matt Sadowski (born 1978), a Canadian actor
- Prov Sadovsky - stage name of Prov Mikhailovich Yermilov (1818–1872), a Russian actor
- Przemysław Sadowski, Polish actor
- Thomas Sadoski (born 1976), an American actor

==== Musicians ====
- Mariana Sadovska (born 1972), a Ukrainian musician
- Robert Sadowski (died 2006), a Polish guitarist

==== Visual artists ====
- Stephen Sadowski, a Canadian comic book artist
- Wiktor Sadowski (born 1956), a Polish graphic designer

=== Authors ===
- David Sadowski, American author
- Frank Sadowski, American author

=== Military ===
- Jan Jagmin-Sadowski (1895–1977), a Polish general
- Joseph J. Sadowski (1917–1944), a World War II U.S. Army soldier

=== Science and technology ===
- George Sadowsky (born 1936), an American computer scientist
- Jason Scott Sadofsky, owner of textfiles.com and prominent digital archivist figure
- Mikhail Sadovsky (1904–1994), a Soviet physicist
- Otto von Sadovszky (1925–2004), a college professor of anthropology in southern California

=== Politicians ===
- George G. Sadowski (1903–1961), a U.S. Representative from Michigan
- Piatro Sadoǔski (1941–2026), the first ambassador of independent Belarus to Germany in 1992–1994
- Bill Sadowski (1944–1992), a U.S. Representative from Florida

=== Others ===
- Anthony Sadowski American Pioneer 1736
- Jacob Sodowski, an eighteenth-century Polish-American fur trader

== Places ==
- Szadowski Młyn, a village in Poland
- 18702 Sadowski, an asteroid
- Various places named Sadowo, Sadowa, Sadovo, Sadovy, and Sadowice in Poland
- Various places named Sandusky
- Bill Sadowski Park and Nature Center, a park in Palmetto Bay, FL named after American politician Bill Sadowski

== See also ==
- Sadowsky, a brand of guitars
- Margaret "Legs" Sadovsky - a character in Foxfire: Confessions of a Girl Gang, played by Angelina Jolie in the film adaptation.
