= Buffalo, Minnesota =

City in Minnesota, United States

Buffalo
- City
- Buffalo, Minnesota
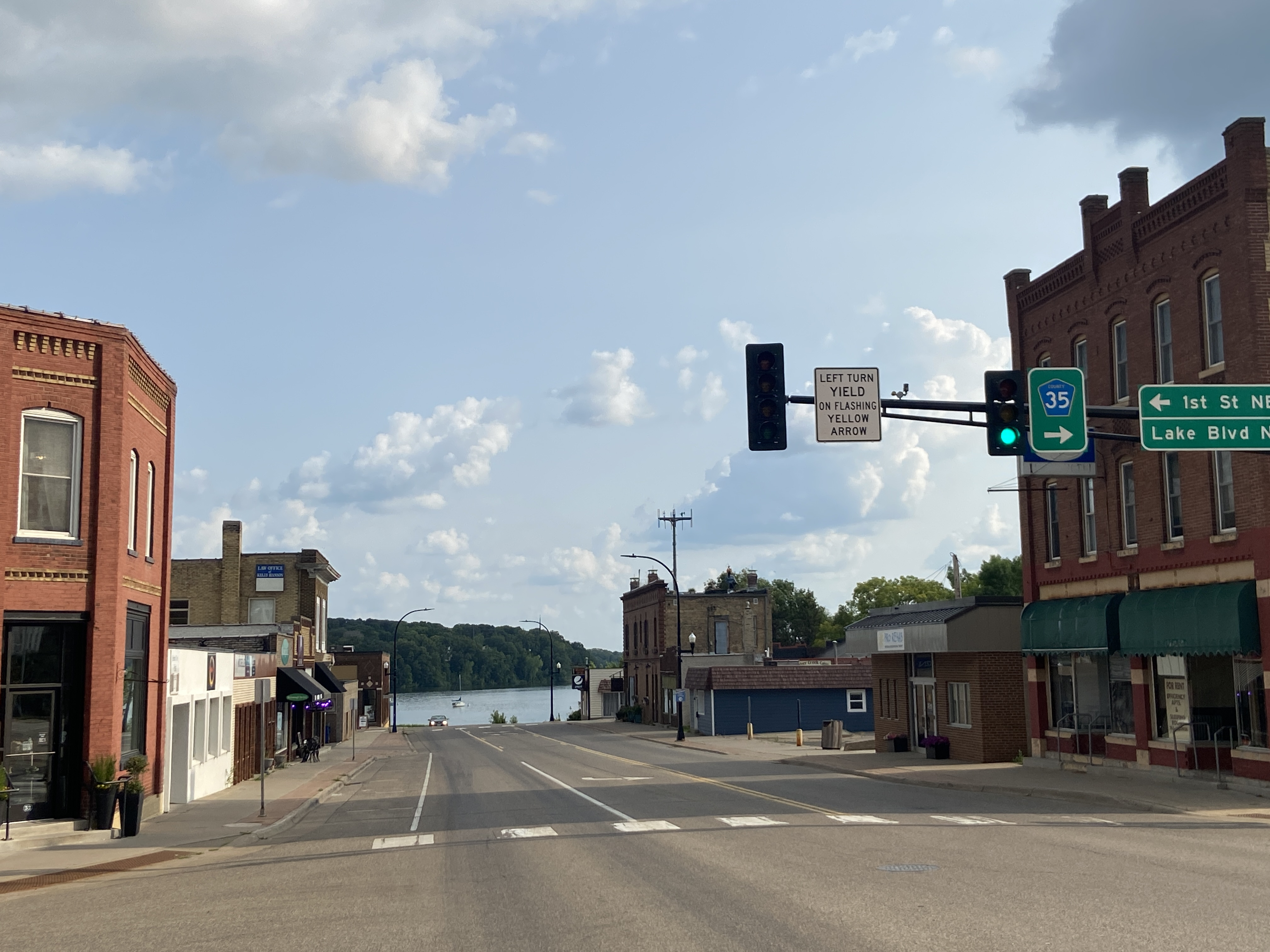
- Downtown Buffalo

- Location of the city of Buffalo within Wright County, Minnesota

- Location within Minnesota Location within the United States
- Coordinates: 45°10′19″N 93°52′29″W
- Country: United States
- State: Minnesota
- County: Wright

Government
  - Mayor: Steve Downer

Area
  - Total: 9.90 sq mi (25.63 km^{2})
  - Land: 7.76 sq mi (20.10 km^{2})
  - Water: 2.14 sq mi (5.53 km^{2}) 25.62%
- Elevation: 928 ft (283 m)

Population (2020)
  - Total: 16,168
  - Density: 2,083.4/sq mi (804.39/km^{2})
- Time zone: UTC-6 (Central)
  - Summer (DST): UTC-5 (Central)
- ZIP code: 55313
- Area code: 763
- FIPS code: 27-08452
- GNIS feature ID: 0640603
- Website: City of Buffalo

Buffalo is a city in the U.S. state of Minnesota and the county seat of Wright County. It is in the Minneapolis–Saint Paul metropolitan area, about 42 miles northwest of Minneapolis on Buffalo Lake. Buffalo's population was 15,453 at the 2010 census and 16,168 at the 2020 census.

Minnesota State Highways 25 and 55 are two of the main routes into the city.

== History ==
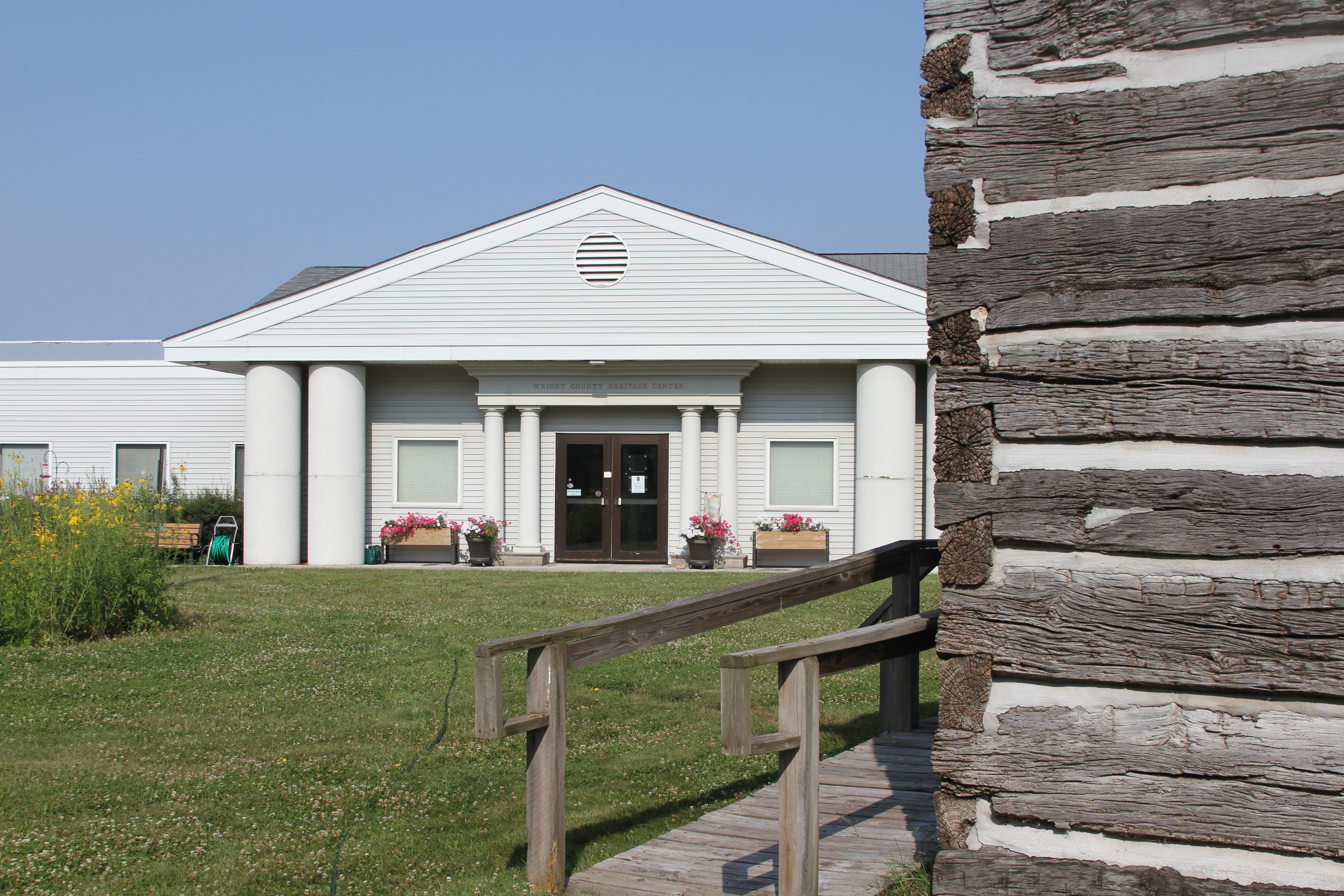
Wright County Heritage Center

Buffalo was platted in 1856 and named after nearby Buffalo Lake. A post office has been in operation in Buffalo since 1856.

A mass shooting and bombing occurred at Allina Health's Buffalo Crossroads medical clinic on February 9, 2021. Five people were shot and one woman died.

== Geography ==
According to the United States Census Bureau, the city has an area of 9.64 square miles (24.97 km^{2}); 7.17 square miles (18.57 km^{2}) is land and 2.47 square miles (6.40 km^{2}) is water. The city is home to many lakes, including Buffalo Lake and Lake Pulaski.

=== Climate ===
The summers are long and warm, while the winters are windy and freezing. The temperature varies from 7 °F to 82 °F. The windiest part of the year lasts around 8.3 months, starting in September, with an average of 10.3 miles per hour.

== Demographics ==
Historical population
| Census | Pop. | Note | %± |
|---|---|---|---|
| 1880 | 143 | | — |
| 1890 | 606 | | 323.8% |
| 1900 | 1,040 | | 71.6% |
| 1910 | 1,227 | | 18.0% |
| 1920 | 1,438 | | 17.2% |
| 1930 | 1,409 | | −2.0% |
| 1940 | 1,695 | | 20.3% |
| 1950 | 1,914 | | 12.9% |
| 1960 | 2,322 | | 21.3% |
| 1970 | 3,275 | | 41.0% |
| 1980 | 4,560 | | 39.2% |
| 1990 | 6,856 | | 50.4% |
| 2000 | 10,097 | | 47.3% |
| 2010 | 15,453 | | 53.0% |
| 2020 | 16,168 | | 4.6% |
U.S. Decennial Census

=== 2020 census ===
As of the 2020 census, Buffalo had a population of 16,168. The median age was 38.7 years. 26.3% of residents were under the age of 18 and 16.2% of residents were 65 years of age or older. For every 100 females there were 95.1 males, and for every 100 females age 18 and over there were 92.9 males age 18 and over.

100.0% of residents lived in urban areas, while 0.0% lived in rural areas.

There were 6,069 households in Buffalo, of which 35.7% had children under the age of 18 living in them. Of all households, 52.5% were married-couple households, 16.1% were households with a male householder and no spouse or partner present, and 24.6% were households with a female householder and no spouse or partner present. About 25.5% of all households were made up of individuals and 11.4% had someone living alone who was 65 years of age or older.

There were 6,278 housing units, of which 3.3% were vacant. The homeowner vacancy rate was 0.9% and the rental vacancy rate was 3.4%.

Racial composition as of the 2020 census
| Race | Number | Percent |
|---|---|---|
| White | 14,682 | 90.8% |
| Black or African American | 204 | 1.3% |
| American Indian and Alaska Native | 67 | 0.4% |
| Asian | 177 | 1.1% |
| Native Hawaiian and Other Pacific Islander | 8 | 0.0% |
| Some other race | 230 | 1.4% |
| Two or more races | 800 | 4.9% |
| Hispanic or Latino (of any race) | 508 | 3.1% |

=== 2010 census ===
As of the census of 2010, there were 15,453 people, 5,699 households, and 3,970 families residing in the city. The population density was 2,155.2 inhabitants per square mile (832.1/km^{2}). There were 6,044 housing units at an average density of 843.0 per square mile (325.5/km^{2}). The racial makeup of the city was 95.1% White, 0.8% African American, 0.5% Native American, 0.9% Asian, 0.7% from other races, and 2.0% from two or more races. Hispanic or Latino of any race were 2.8% of the population.

There were 5,699 households, of which 41.0% had children under the age of 18 living with them, 54.3% were married couples living together, 10.9% had a female householder with no husband present, 4.5% had a male householder with no wife present, and 30.3% were non-families. 24.9% of all households were made up of individuals, and 9.6% had someone living alone who was 65 years of age or older. The average household size was 2.64 and the average family size was 3.17.

The median age in the city was 34.3 years. 29.7% of residents were under the age of 18; 6.4% were between the ages of 18 and 24; 30.3% were from 25 to 44; 21.7% were from 45 to 64; and 11.8% were 65 years of age or older. The gender makeup of the city was 48.5% male and 51.5% female.

=== 2000 census ===
As of 2000, the median income for a household in the city was $49,573 and the median income for a family was $59,250. Males had a median income of $39,960 versus $27,793 for females. The per capita income was $21,424. About 4.6% of families and 5.1% of the population were below the poverty line, including 6.0% of those under age 18 and 5.1% of those age 65 or over.

== Arts and culture ==
Buffalo has a large variety of art and culture for its size. The Buffalo Community Theater has been producing plays since at least 1983. The Buffalo Community Orchestra has been part of the community since 1995 and has over 50 members. It is known for the "Concert in the Park" series it puts on every summer for free. The orchestra is also funded by businesses and residents of Buffalo and the surrounding area. Also in the area are the Wright County Chamber Chorus and the Wright Ringers bell choir. Buffalo is also home to many antique shops that have sales the first Thursday of every month.

During the winter, the Civics Center houses two ice sheets and an outdoor rink. It is used for open skating, youth and adult hockey, and figure skating. The Buffalo Youth Hockey Association and the Buffalo Figure Skating Club both use the Civic Center as their home rink.

== Government ==
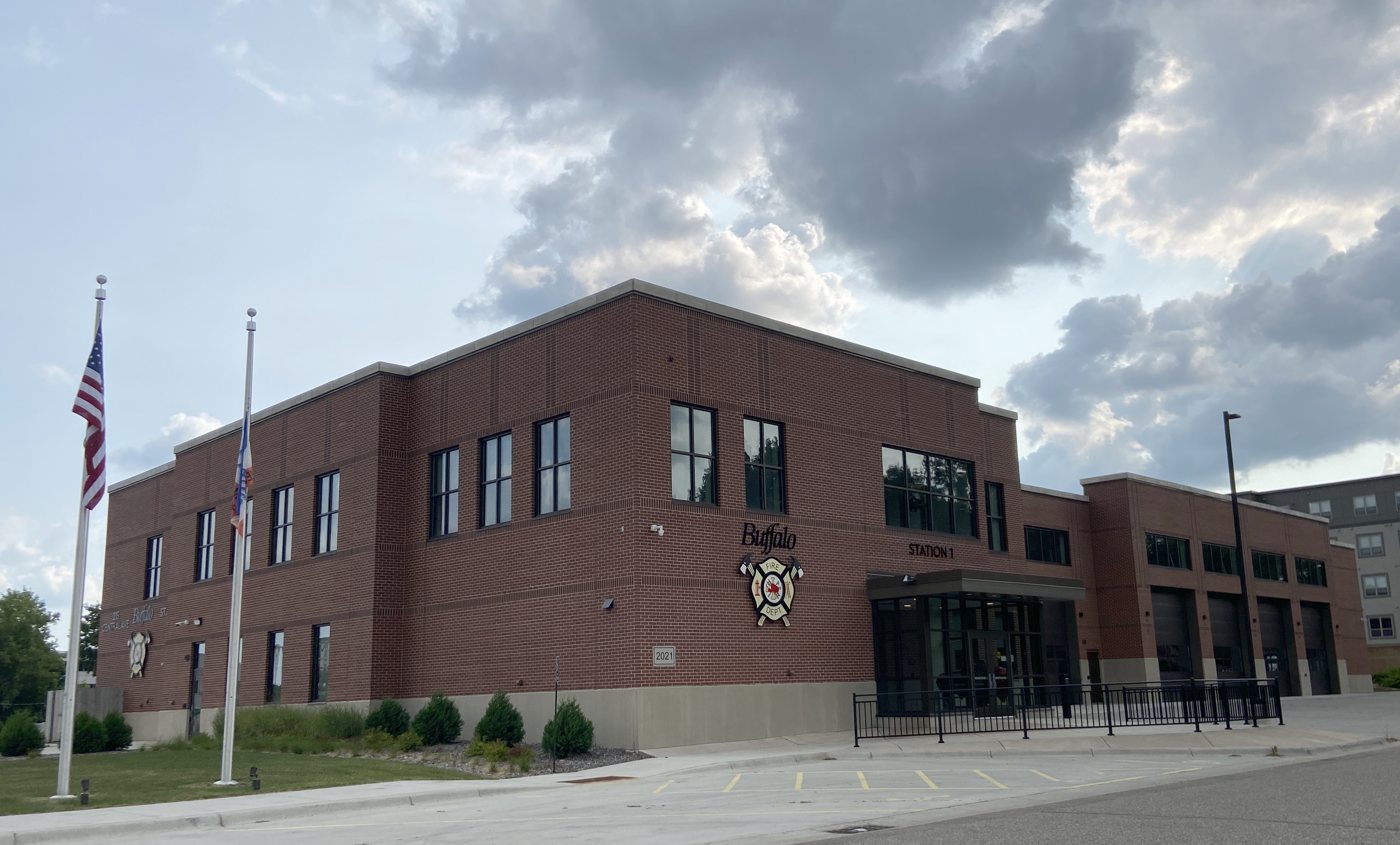
Buffalo Fire Department, Station 1

Buffalo has a city council with five members, including the mayor. The mayor is elected every two years and presides over council meetings. As of 2026, the mayor is Steve Downer and the council members are Sheila Crawford, Brad Dahl, George Fantauzza, and Erin Walsh. Aside from the mayor, council members serve four-year terms, with elections for two at a time every two years. Buffalo and Wright County are in Minnesota's 6th congressional district.

== Education ==
The local school district is Buffalo–Hanover–Montrose Schools. It is composed of schools in Buffalo, Hanover, and Montrose. There are six elementary schools: Discovery Center, Northwinds, Parkside, Tatanka, Hanover, and Montrose. There is a middle school, Buffalo Community Middle School, and a high school, Buffalo High School. There is also a private Catholic school, St. Francis Xavier School, for grades K–8; a public charter school, Terra Nova, for grades 6–12; and a private Christian academy, Impact Christian Academy, for grades K–8.

== Media ==
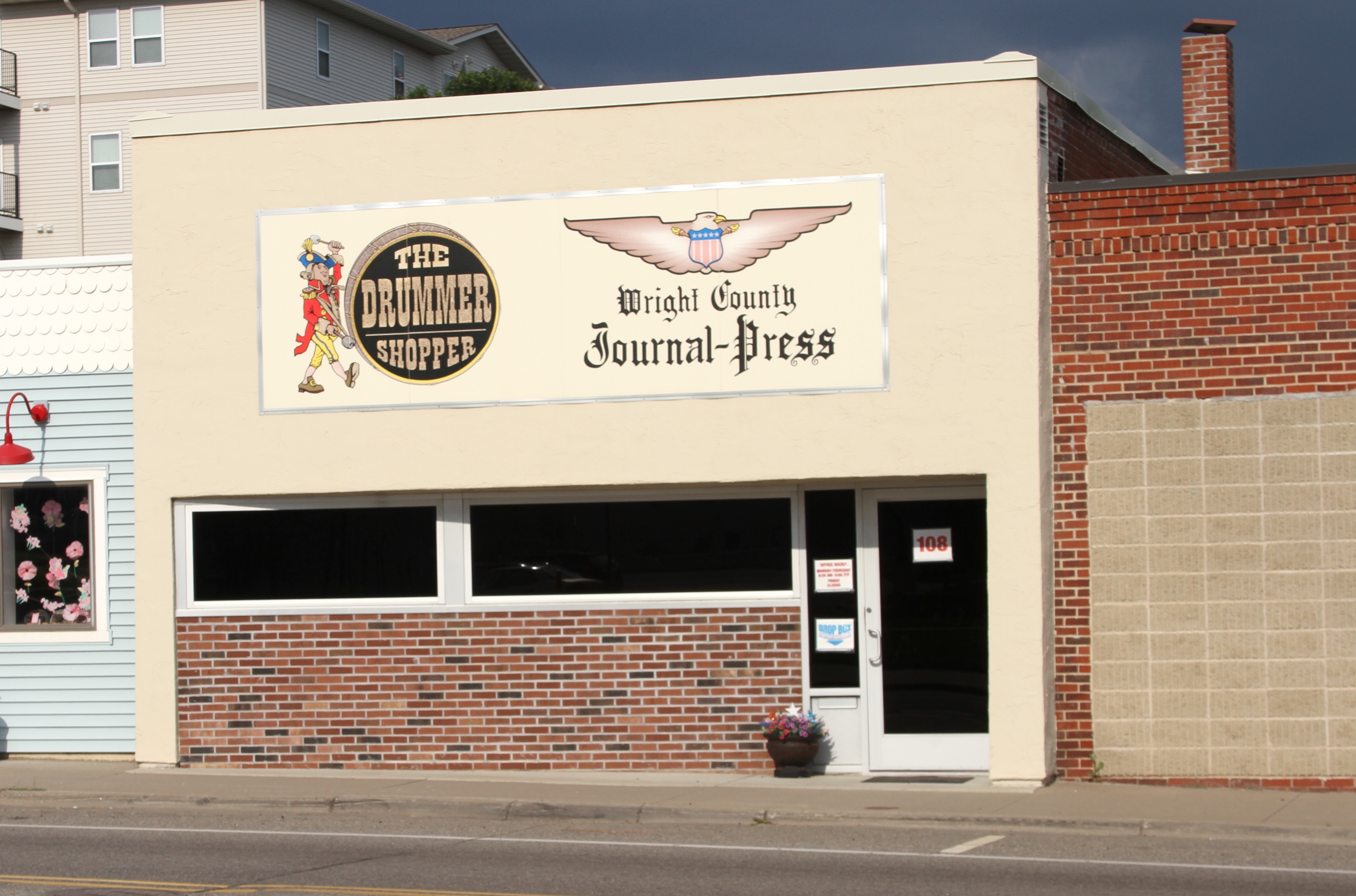
Wright County Journal-Press building

KRWC 1360 AM has served Buffalo and the Wright County area since 1971 and is just outside city limits. It provides local and national news and broadcasts high-school sports for Buffalo and surrounding communities. It also airs oldies, classic rock, and contemporary country music.

There are two local newspapers, both owned and operated by the Wright County Journal Press, The Drummer and The Wright County Journal Press. The Wright County Journal Press has been in operation since 1930.

== Notable people ==
- Jada Habisch, professional ice hockey player and reserve for the Seattle Torrent
- Treyton Welch, professional football player for the New Orleans Saints
