= Ponn Humpback Covered Bridge =

- U.S. National Register of Historic Places
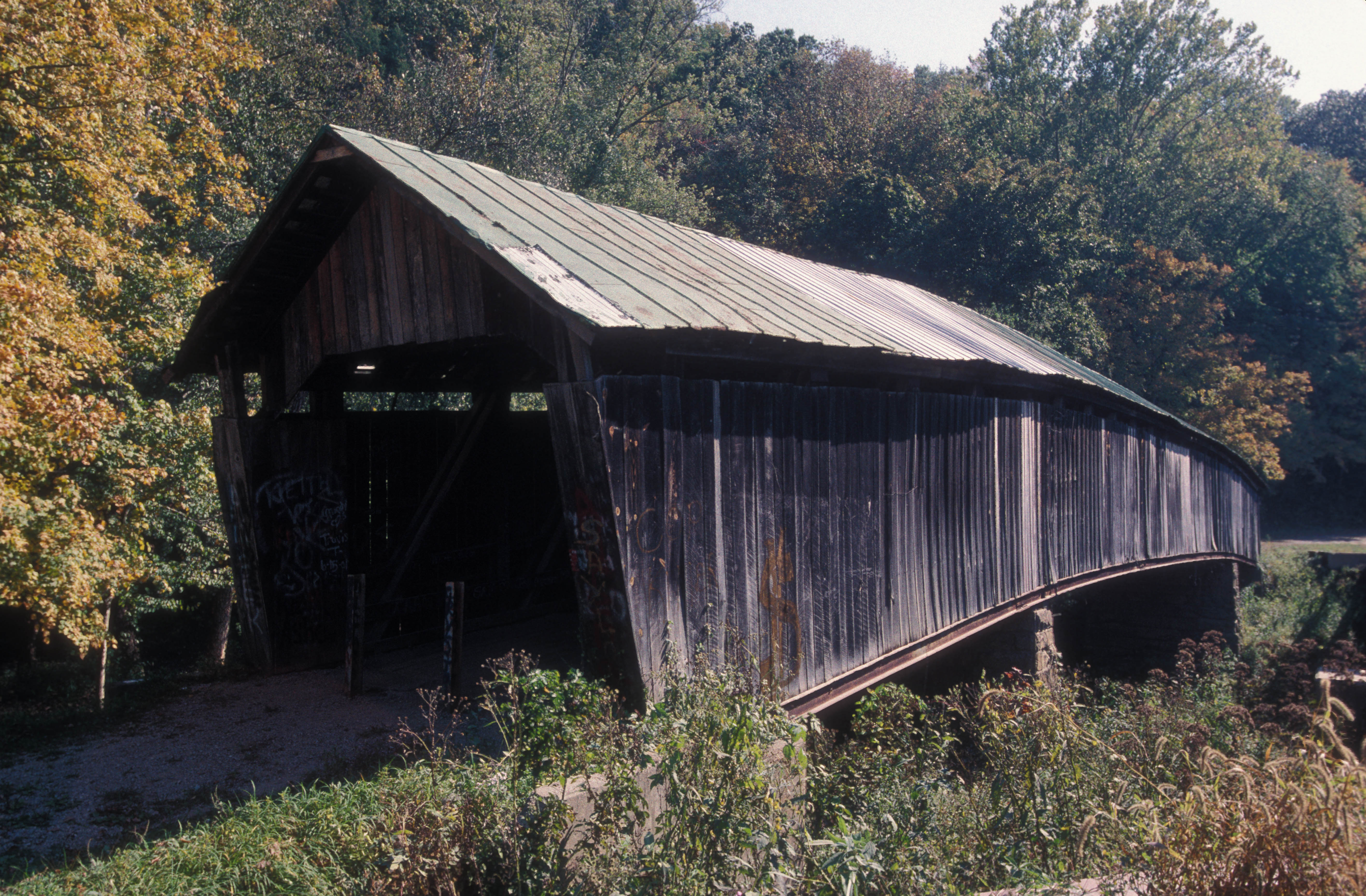
- Western side and northern portal

- Location within Ohio Location within the United States
- Location: 4 miles (6.4 km) southwest of Wilkesville, Ohio, over Raccoon Creek
- Coordinates: 39°2′52″N 82°22′35″W
- Area: Less than 1 acre (0.40 ha)
- Built: 1874
- Architect: Martin E. McGrath; Lyman Wells
- Architectural style: Burr arch
- NRHP reference No.: 73001545
- Added to NRHP: April 11, 1973

The Ponn Humpback Covered Bridge was a historic covered bridge in the southeastern part of the U.S. state of Ohio. Located near the village of Wilkesville in Vinton County, it bore a name derived from its unusual shape: the bridge was arched in the middle, rather than being flat like a typical covered bridge. Declared a historic site in the 1970s, the bridge had a history closely tied to arson — it was constructed to replace a bridge that had been burned intentionally, and it met its end at the hands of an arsonist.

== History ==
The first bridge spanning Raccoon Creek southwest of Wilkesville was constructed in 1848; it lasted until 1870, when the Vinton County government contracted for the construction of a replacement. The new bridge failed to match its predecessor's endurance record, as it was intentionally destroyed four years later by a fire set by an unknown individual. At the time, arson was a frequent crime in southeastern Vinton County, and the county announced a reward of $1,000 for the capture of the miscreant responsible; however, no occasion ever arose for the reward to be paid. Within days of the bridge's destruction, county officials imposed a new tax to pay to replace the arsoned bridge, and under the leadership of Martin McGrath and Lyman Wells, it was completed within the year at a cost of $1,898. After decades of carrying ordinary road traffic, the bridge was found to have suffered structural deterioration, but instead of replacing it, county officials chose to reroute the road onto a new truss bridge built parallel to the covered bridge, leaving the covered bridge as a tourist attraction. Named a historic site in 1973, it remained in its original place until 6 June 2013, when it was destroyed by a fire that the state fire marshal deemed to be intentionally set.

== Construction ==
Built of wood with steel elements, the Ponn Humpback Bridge was constructed atop abutments of sandstone. Its Burr arch truss design featured a camber of 19 inches (480 mm), both at the base of the walls and at their top. This arch, the height of which was approximately 1% of the bridge's length of 165 feet (50 m), was the bridge's most distinctive feature; rather than being constructed to permit the passage of boat traffic, the arch (or "humpback") was included in order to enable the bridge to cross the deep gorge of Raccoon Creek without any structural support in the middle. As a result, throughout its history, the Humpback Bridge was one of Ohio's longest covered bridges as well as one of its most unusual.

== Historic designation ==
The Ponn Humpback Covered Bridge was listed on the National Register of Historic Places in April 1973, becoming Vinton County's first location with that designation. Hope Furnace near Zaleski gained National Register status in the following month, a group of Indian mounds were added in 1974, and by the time of the bridge's destruction, it was one of ten sites countywide. The bridge's destruction does not automatically entail its removal from the Register; the Lockington Covered Bridge in far western Ohio burned in 1989, but when the Humpback Bridge was destroyed, the Lockington Bridge still had not yet been undesignated.
