= Yelizaveta Sadovskaya =

Russian actress

Yelizaveta Mikhailovna Sadovskaya
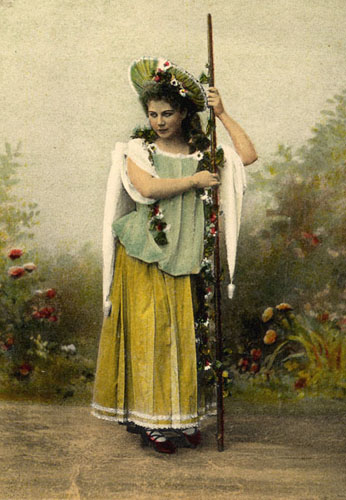
- Born: Yelizaveta Sadovskaya; 23 April (5 May), 1872; Moscow, Russian Empire
- Died: 4 June 1934
- Occupation: Actress
- Employer(s): Maly Theater, Moscow, Moscow
- Family: Sadovsky theatrical family

Yelizaveta Mikhailovna Sadovskaya (April 23 (May 5), 1872 – June 4, 1934) was a Russian and Soviet actress, Honored Artist of the RSFSR (1927).

== Family and education ==
Elizaveta Mikhailovna Sadovskaya was born in Moscow on April 23 (May 5), 1872 into the family of theater actor Olga Osipovna Sadovskaya and actor and director Mikhail Provich Sadovsky (born 1847). Her brother was actor and director Prov Sadovsky Jr. (born 1874). Her grandfather, Prov Mikhailovich Sadovsky (born Prov Mikhailovich Yermilov in 1818), was founder of the Sadovsky theatrical family, who were famous for their interpretations of the plays of Aleksandr Ostrovsky and the Maly Theater, Moscow.

In 1894 she graduated from drama courses at the Moscow Theatre School (teachers O. A. Pravdin and M. P. Sadovsky).

== Performance ==
She was accepted into the troupe of the Maly Theatre, where she worked until the end of her life.

During the life of her mother, Yelizaveta Mikhailovna had the stage name Sadovskaya 2nd.

Yelizaveta Mikhailovna was known for her stage charm, creating vivid, memorable images of Russian girls.

== Death ==
Yelizaveta Mikhailovna died on June 4, 1934, in Moscow. She was buried at the Pyatnitskoye Cemetery.

== Recognition and awards ==
Honored Artist of the RSFSR (1927)

== Roles in the theatre ==
- 1894 - "Vasilisa Melentievna" A. N. Ostrovsky – Anna
- "Forest" by A. N. Ostrovsky – Aksyusha
- “Poverty is not a vice” by A. N. Ostrovsky – Gordevna
- "Wolves and Sheep" by A. N. Ostrovsky – Glafira
- "The Snow Maiden" by A. N. Ostrovsky - Snow Maiden
- “Truth is good, but happiness is better” A. N. Ostrovsky – Poliksen
- "Talents and Admirers" by A. N. Ostrovsky – Negin
- "Tenement house" A. N. Ostrovsky – Yulinka
- "Jokers" by A. N. Ostrovsky – Verochka
- "Thunderstorm" A. N. Ostrovsky – Varvara
- "Inspector" N. V. Gogol - Marya Antonovna
- Shakespeare's "The Tempest" – Ariel
- "Woe from Wit" Griboedova – Liza
- The Marriage of Figaro by Beaumarchais – Suzanne
- "Fighters" B. S. Romashova – Lenchitskaya
