= Saborowski (surname) =

Saborowski is a surname.

== People with the surname ==
- Frank Saborowski (born 1958), German football defender
- Gerd Saborowski (born 1943), German former professional footballer
- Ines Saborowski (born 1967), German politician

== See also ==
- Sadowski
