= Zaleski Mound Group =

Archaeological site in Ohio, United States

- Ranger Station Mound; Markham Mound; Zaleski Methodist Church Mound
- U.S. National Register of Historic Places
- Location within Ohio Location within the United States
- Location: Entrance to Zaleski State Forest (R.S.); Unspecified (M.); 114 Broadway St. (Z.M.C.)
- Nearest city: Zaleski, Ohio
- Coordinates: 39°17′2.1″N 82°23′44.4″W (Z.M.C.)
- Area: 1 acre (0.40 ha) (each)
- NRHP reference No.: 74001641 (R.S.); 74001640 (M.); 74001642 (Z.M.C.)
- Added to NRHP: July 15, 1974 (R.S.); May 3, 1974 (M.); July 15, 1974 (Z.M.C.)

The Zaleski Mound Group is a collection of three burial mounds in the village of Zaleski, Ohio, United States. Built by people of the prehistoric Adena culture, these earthworks are valuable archaeological sites.

== Mound 1, Ranger Station ==
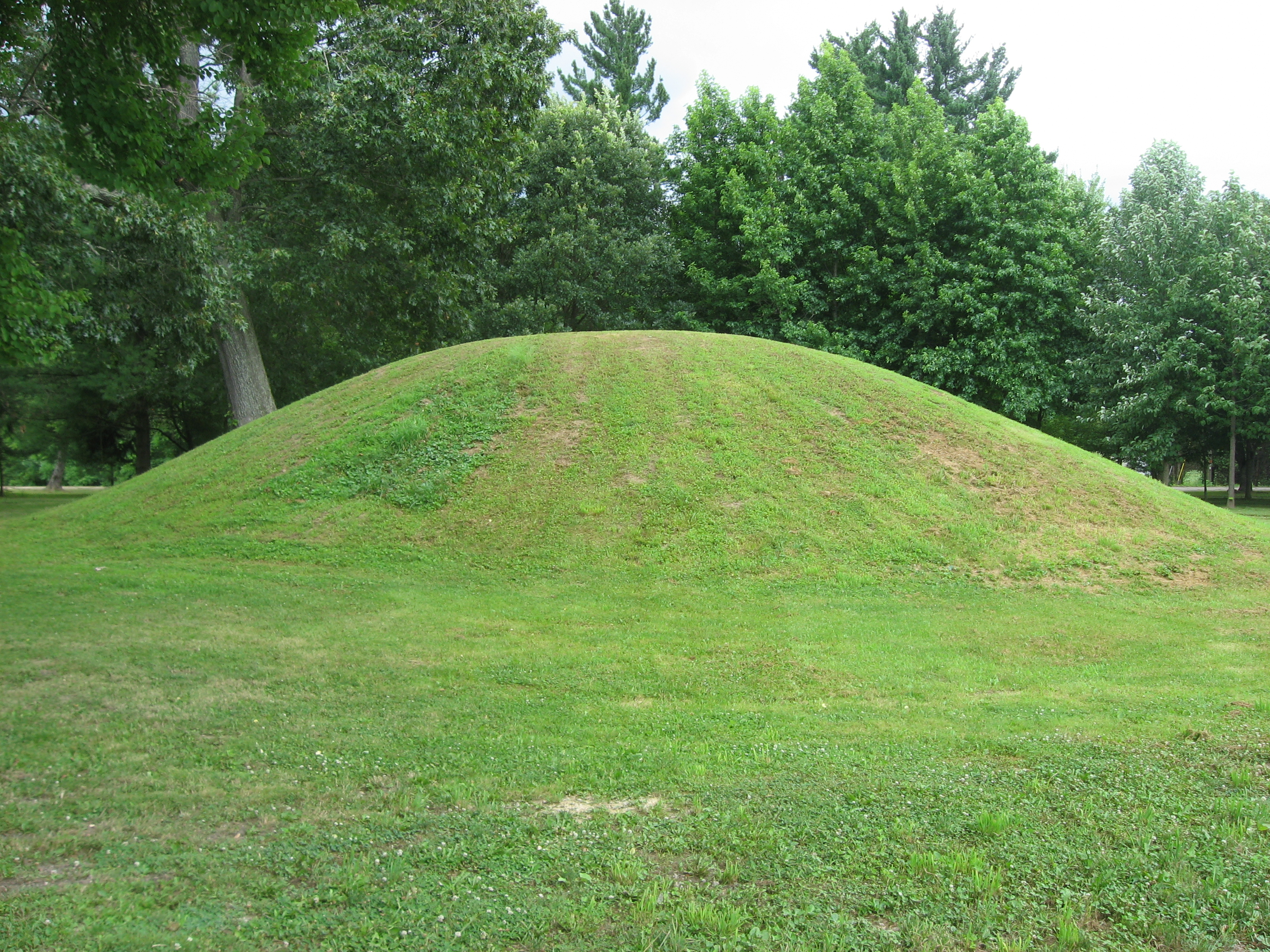
Ranger Station Mound

The largest of the three Zaleski mounds, the Ranger Station Mound is a conical structure located within the bounds of Zaleski State Forest. Located in a community park by the entrance to the forest, the mound is tree-covered with few changes from its original state. At a height of 14.4 feet (4.4 m), it is the largest mound in the Zaleski Mound Group.

In the 1850s, local residents dug into the mound and placed a cold cellar on its northern side; in the process, they uncovered a skeleton that was given into the possession of a local doctor. The changing needs of the state forest led the Ohio Department of Natural Resources to remove the cellar in 1959; after the intrusion was taken out of its place, the mound was restored to its original shape. In spite of the digging needed to create the cellar, the Ranger Station Mound is the best-preserved of the mounds in the Zaleski Group. No archaeological excavation has ever been carried out at Mound No. 3, the Methodist Church Mound, but it has possibly been damaged by the construction of a fence line. Due to its size and location, the Ranger Station Mound may contain more valuable artifacts than either of the other two mounds.

== Mound 2, Markham ==
The Markham Mound is a privately owned structure. Despite its proximity to the other two mounds, no evidence is present of any ancient village site near the mound.

== Mound 3, Methodist Church ==
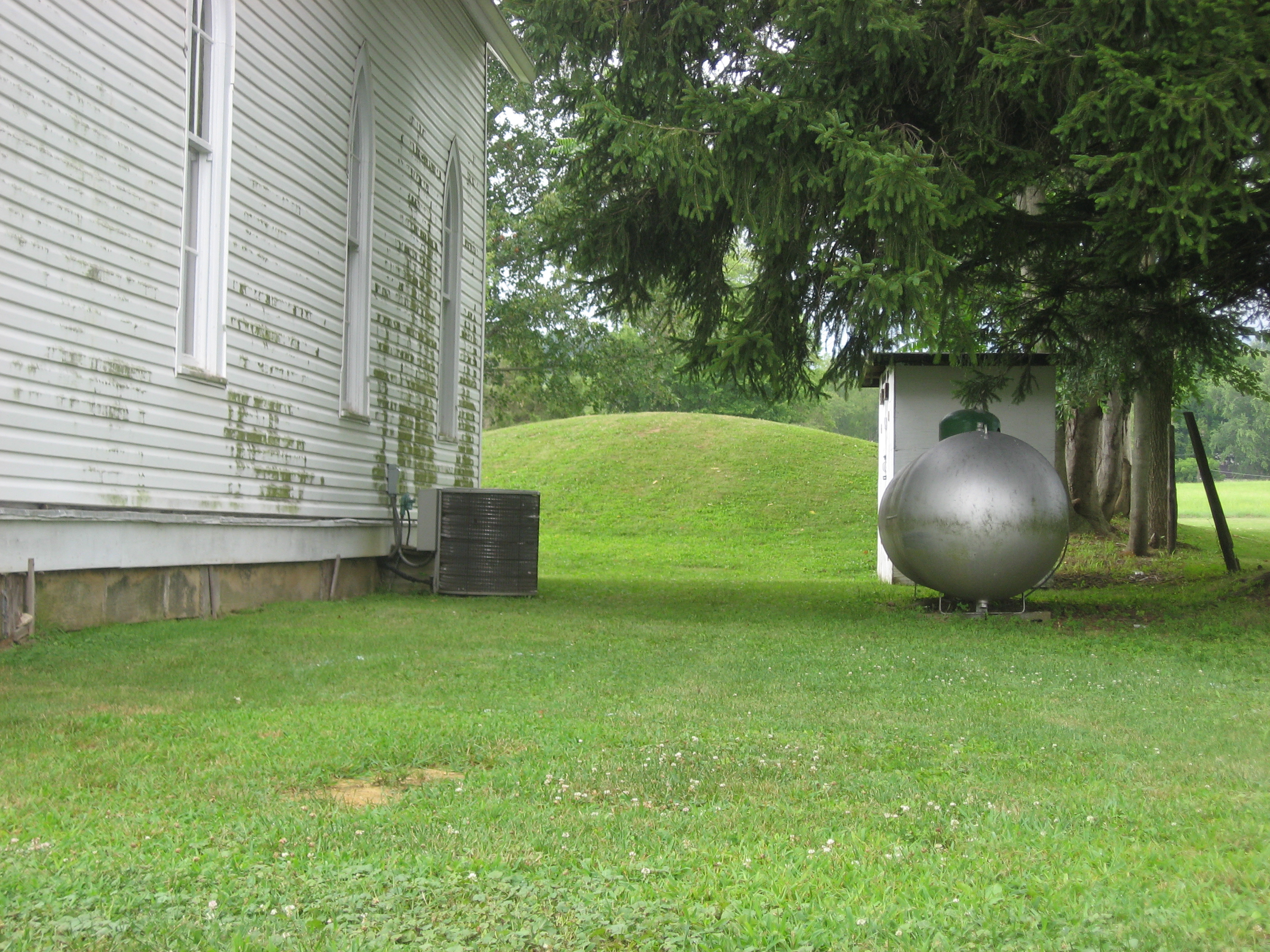
View of the Methodist Church Mound

The Zaleski Methodist Church Mound is a wide, low mound in the shape of an ellipse. Measuring 60 feet (18 m) long and 53 feet (16 m) wide, it is only slightly more than 7 feet (2.1 m) tall. At the time of white settlement, it may have been taller; the presence of evidence of a fence across the top suggests that the activity of settlers may have reduced it.

Located immediately behind the Zaleski United Methodist Church, it may be the most valuable of the six mounds that originally composed the Zaleski Mound Group. Three of the six have been destroyed, while both the Ranger Station Mound and the Markham Mound have been disturbed since the time of white settlement. As the Zaleski Methodist Church Mound shows little evidence of damage, it presumably contains the grave goods that were originally buried within.

== Recognition ==
In 1974, the three mounds were listed on the National Register of Historic Places: Mound 2 on May 3, and the others on July 15. All three received this designation because they were seen as important archaeological sites for understanding the Adena people that built them. The three mounds that have been destroyed were not listed, because archaeological sites that have been greatly disturbed are not eligible for inclusion on the Register. The Register also includes one other archaeological site in Vinton County and one building in Zaleski: a mound near Londonderry known as the "Ratcliffe Mound," and the Masonic Lodge No. 472 respectively.

== Notes ==
a: When no mound abbreviation is given, Ranger Station is to be assumed.
