= Lake Hope State Park =

Park in Ohio, USA

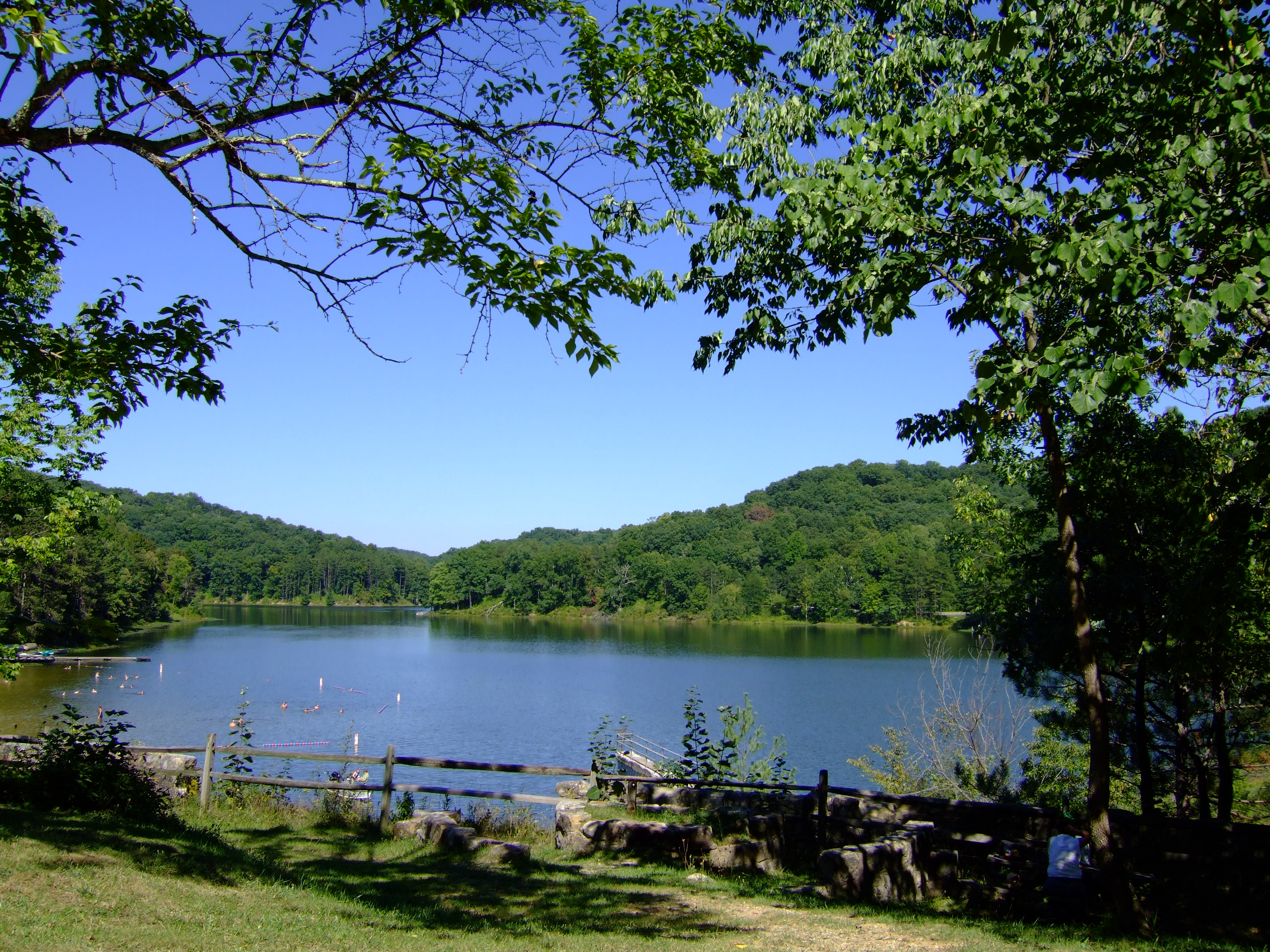
- Lake Hope

- Location within Ohio Location within the United States
- Location: Vinton County, Ohio, United States
- Nearest town: Zaleski, Ohio
- Coordinates: 39°20′00″N 82°21′04″W
- Area: Land: 2,983 acres (1,207 ha); Water: 120 acres (49 ha)
- Elevation: 915 feet (279 m)
- Established: 1937 (renamed in 1949)
- Administrator: Ohio Department of Natural Resources
- Designation: Ohio state park
- Website: Lake Hope State Park

Lake Hope State Park is a public recreation area encompassing 2,983 acres (1,207 ha) within Zaleski State Forest, located five miles (8.0 km) northeast of Zaleski in Vinton County, Ohio. The state park is centered on Lake Hope, a 120-acre (49 ha) impoundment on Big Sandy Run.

== History ==
The park and lake are named after the former mining village of Hope, Ohio. The original town of Hope still stands under the waters of Lake Hope. The town was flooded up to the side of a cliff, which is now used as the swimming area. There is still one original building standing. The old one-room Hope School stands nearby in the state forest, and has been renovated for use as a community meeting place. The Moonville Rail-Trail passes close by. Within the park is the old Hope Furnace, which once smelted iron ore mined out of the area's hills.

Established as Lake Hope Forest Park in 1937, it earned its state park appellation with the creation of the Division of Parks and Recreation in 1949. A new park lodge opened in 2013, seven years after the destruction of the original lodge by fire in 2006.

== Activities and amenities ==
The park features boating, fishing, swimming, hiking and mountain biking trails, lodge, cottages, and campground.
