= Hope Furnace =

- U.S. National Register of Historic Places
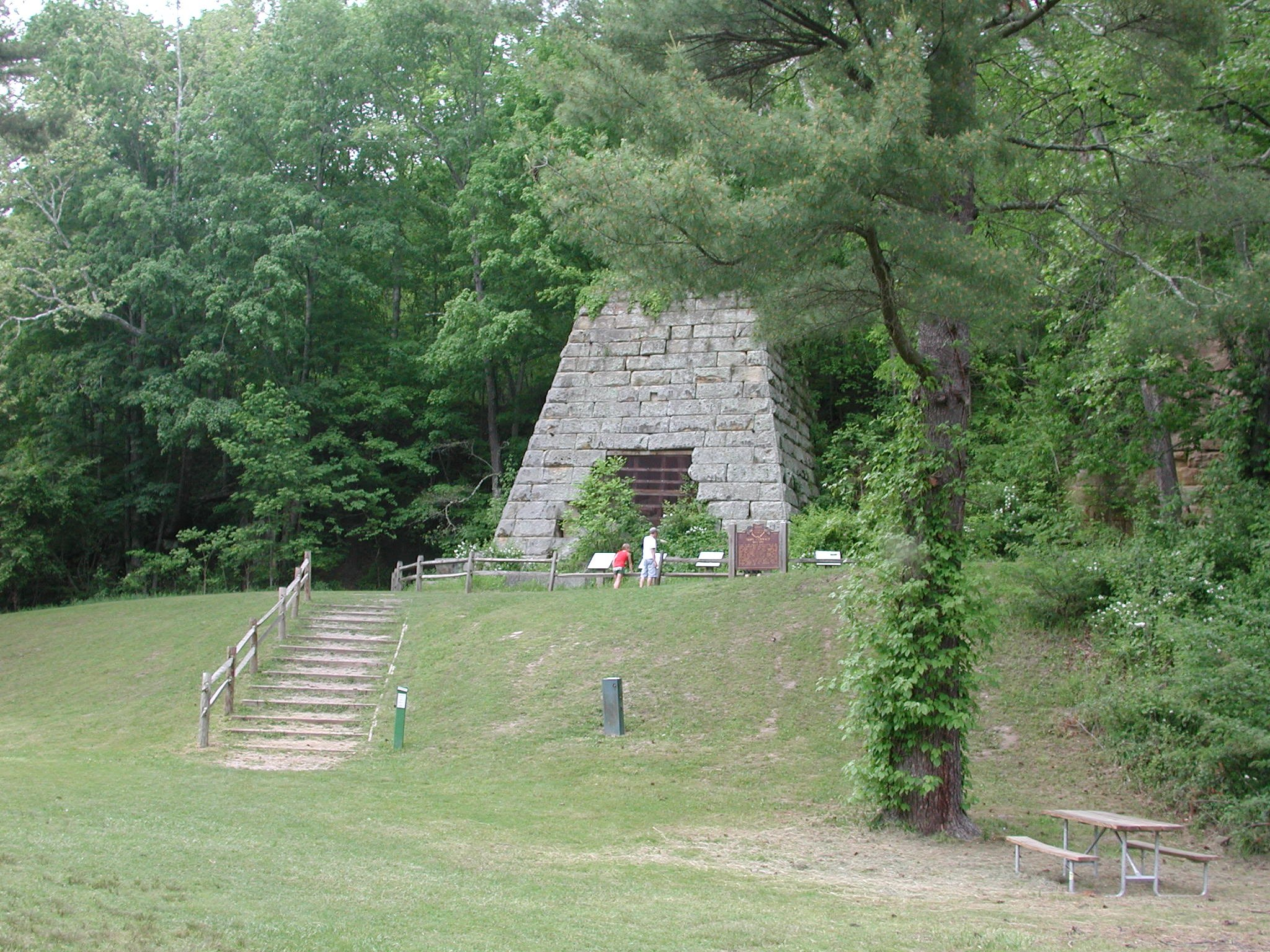
- Hope Furnace, seen from State Route 278

- Location within Ohio Location within the United States
- Location: State Route 278, 5 miles (8.0 km) northeast of Zaleski, Ohio
- Coordinates: 39°19′55″N 82°20′25″W
- Area: less than one acre
- Built: 1854
- NRHP reference No.: 73001546
- Added to NRHP: May 25, 1973

The Hope Furnace is a historic blast furnace in the southeastern part of the U.S. state of Ohio. Located along State Route 278, approximately 5 miles (8.0 km) northeast of the village of Zaleski, it is one of two extant iron furnaces in Vinton County. Between 1854 and 1874, the furnace was used to smelt iron ore, using coal or charcoal for fuel. It is a rectangular structure, built of sandstone and shaped like a truncated pyramid.

Like many other iron furnaces in southeastern Ohio, Hope Furnace was surrounded by a community of at least three hundred residents at its height. The production of iron and the supply of the materials required for iron smelting required a large number of workers, and during a furnace's years of operation, it was the center of a temporary community. No buildings from the community remain to the present day: when the furnace closed, the workers dispersed, and the buildings collapsed or were demolished. Although the buildings are gone, many artifacts still remain in the soil surrounding the furnace; most significant are the many pieces of slag that litter the ground.

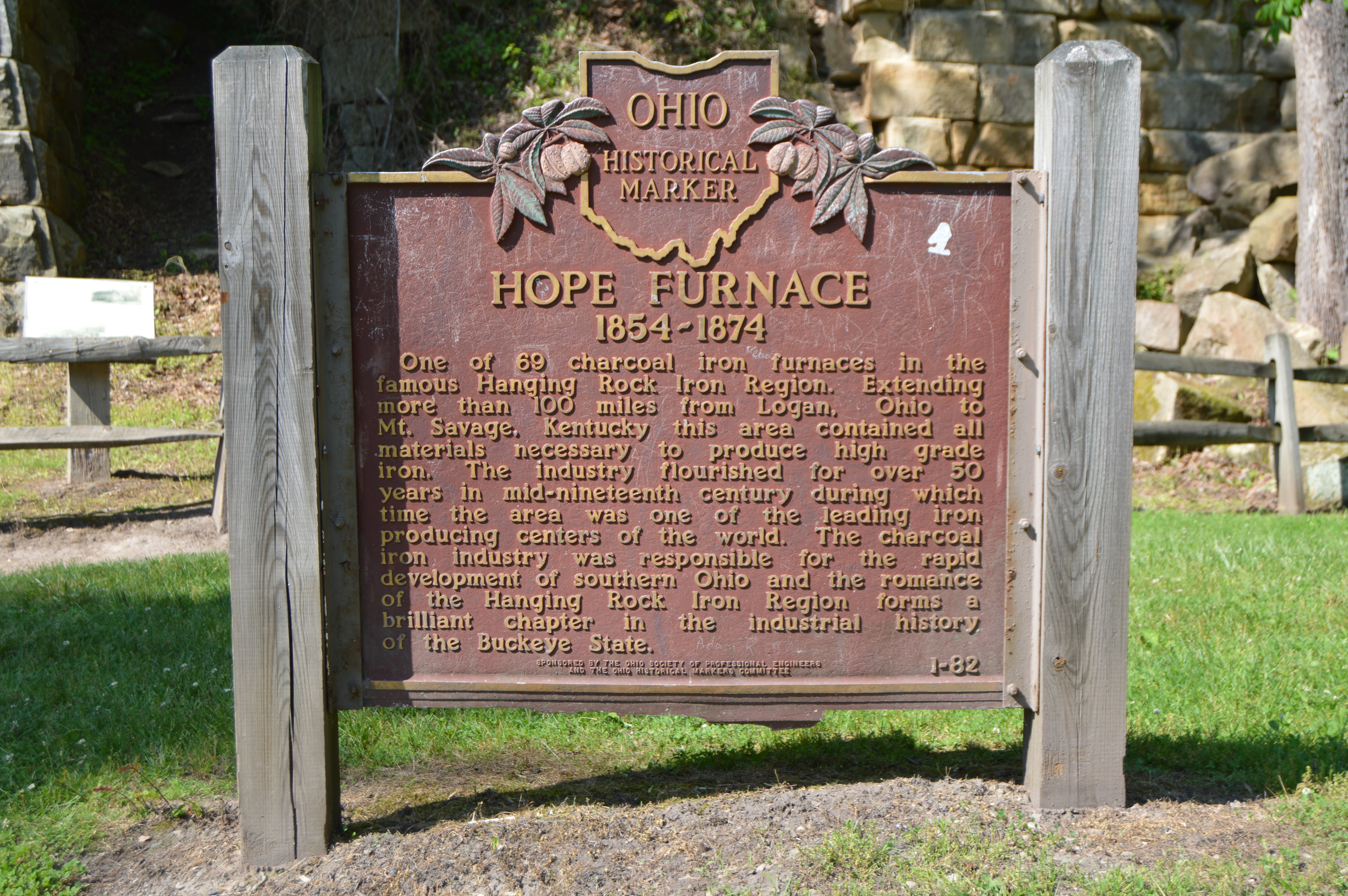
Historical marker

Today, Hope Furnace is part of Lake Hope State Park. Because of its importance in local history, the furnace was listed on the National Register of Historic Places in 1973. It was the second place in Vinton County to be added to the Register, being preceded only by the Ponn Humpback Covered Bridge.
