= Sadovo (disambiguation) =

Sadovo might refer to:

- Sadovo, small town in Sadovo Municipality, Plovdiv Province, central Bulgaria
- Sadovo, Blagoevgrad Province, village in Hadzhidimovo Municipality, in Blagoevgrad Province, Bulgaria
- Sadovo, Burgas Province, village in Sungurlare Municipality, in Burgas Province, in southeastern Bulgaria
- Sadovo, Varna Province, village in the municipality of Avren, in Varna Province, northeastern Bulgaria
- Sadovo, Russia, village in Kaliningrad Oblast, Russia
- Sadovoe, village in the municipality of Bălţi, northern Moldova
- Kallithea Elassonos, a village in Greece that was formerly known as Sadovo

See also

- Sadowo (disambiguation)
- Sadovy (disambiguation)
