= Sandusky (surname) =

Sandusky is a surname. Notable people with the surname include:

- Alex Sandusky (1932–2020), former National Football League player
- E. J. Sandusky (born c. 1969), American former college football coach
- Gerry Sandusky (born 1961), sportscaster, son of John Sandusky
- Jerry Sandusky (born 1944), convicted child molester and former college football coach
- Jim Sandusky (born 1961), former Canadian Football League player
- John Sandusky (1925–2006), American National Football League player and coach
- Jon Sandusky (born 1977), American former college football player, son of Jerry Sandusky
- Mike Sandusky (born 1935), American National Football League player

== See also ==
- Sandusky (disambiguation)
