= Sandusky =

Sandusky may refer to:

== Places in the United States ==
=== Cities and towns ===
- Sandusky, Indiana
- Sandusky, Iowa
- Sandusky, Michigan
- Sandusky, Ohio
- Upper Sandusky, Ohio
- Sandusky, West Virginia
- Sandusky, Wisconsin

=== Townships ===
- Sandusky Township, Crawford County, Ohio
- Sandusky Township, Richland County, Ohio
- Sandusky Township, Sandusky County, Ohio

=== County ===
- Sandusky County, Ohio

=== River ===
- The Sandusky River in Ohio

== Other uses ==
- Sandusky (surname), a surname
- Sandusky (locomotive), the first locomotive to operate in Ohio
- Sandusky (automobile company), 1902–1904 automobile manufacturer in Ohio
- Sandusky District, a railroad line in Ohio
- Sandusky High School, a secondary school in Sandusky, Ohio
- Sandusky House (Lynchburg, Virginia), a historic home
- Sandusky station, a Sandusky, Ohio, Amtrak station built in 1892
