= Ratcliffe Mound =

Archaeological site in Ohio, United States

- U.S. National Register of Historic Places
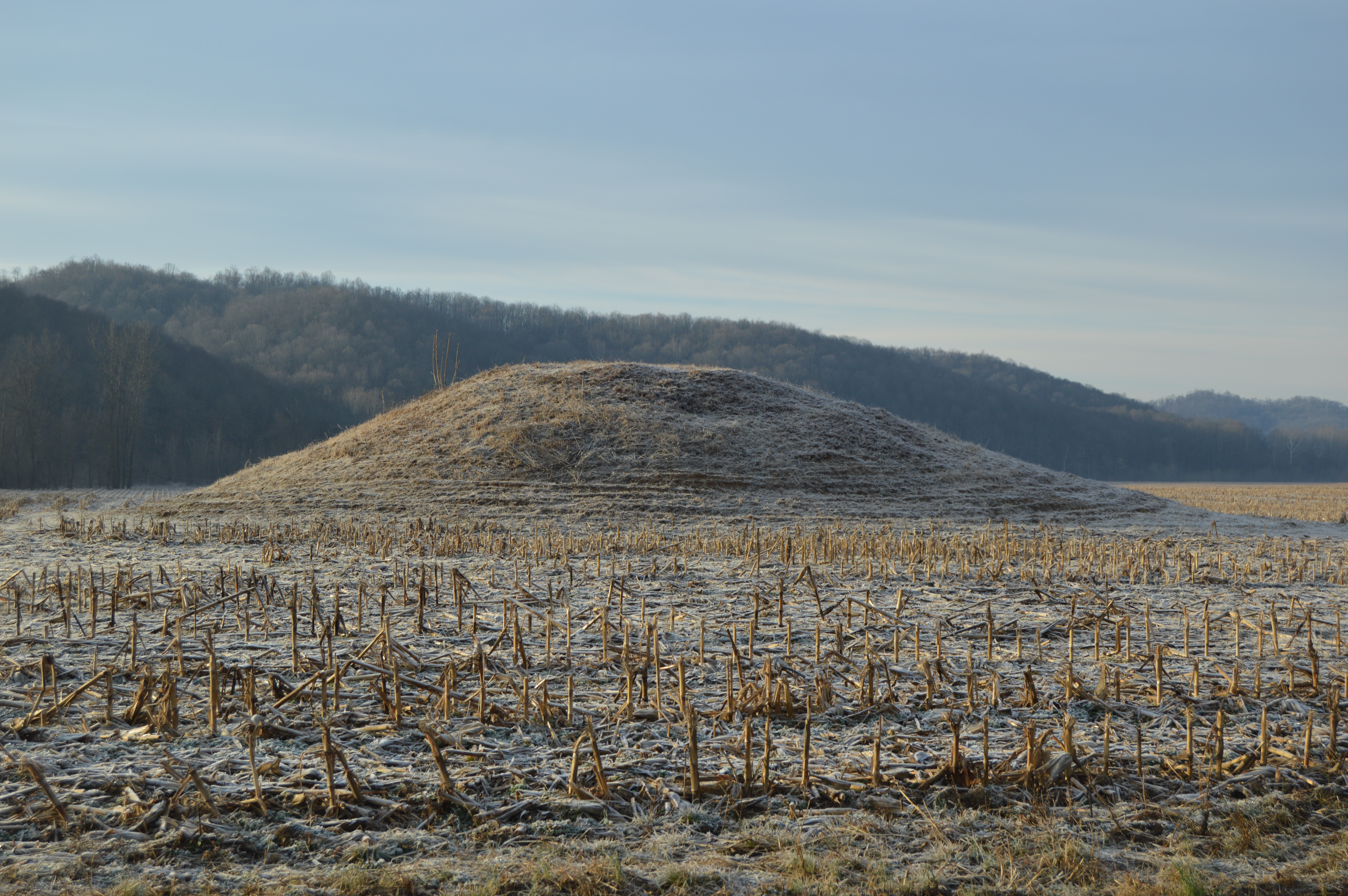
- Northern side

- Location within Ohio Location within the United States
- Location: 5 miles northeast of Londonderry on State Route 327
- Nearest city: Londonderry, Ohio
- Coordinates: 39°18′26″N 82°43′43″W
- Area: Less than 1 acre (0.40 ha)
- NRHP reference No.: 75001548
- Added to NRHP: August 28, 1975

The Ratcliffe Mound (33-Vi-3) is a Native American mound in the southeastern part of the U.S. state of Ohio. Located in western Vinton County, it lies to the east of the community of Londonderry, at the bottom of a steep-walled valley. Sitting in the middle of farm fields near a stream, the mound is isolated in open countryside; there are no nearby woodlots. The mound is a circular cone in shape, 14 feet (4.3 m) high and 86 feet (26 m) in diameter.

Unlike those of many Native American mounds, the identity of the Ratcliffe Mound's builders is unknown. Two cultures from the Woodland period, the Adena and Hopewell, built large numbers of mounds in southeastern Ohio, and the Adena are known to have built a group of six mounds in the Vinton County village of Zaleski, but the Ratcliffe Mound lacks features that enable archaeologists to identify its builders. Neither of these two cultures typically built mounds in locations such as that of the Ratcliffe, and no identifiable artifacts have been found in the vicinity of the mound, so no identification can be made in the mound's present state. Furthermore, no archaeological excavation has been conducted at the Ratcliffe Mound, so no artifacts have been recovered from it.

Despite the inability of archaeologists to classify the mound's origins, it is likely to be a valuable archaeological site if investigated. In recognition of its archaeological value, the Ratcliffe Mound was listed on the National Register of Historic Places in 1975.
