= Sadowice =

Sadowice may refer to the following places in Poland:

- Sadowice, Strzelin County in Gmina Kondratowice, Strzelin County in Lower Silesian Voivodeship (SW Poland)
- Sadowice, Wrocław County in Gmina Kąty Wrocławskie, Wrocław County in Lower Silesian Voivodeship (SW Poland)
