= Jacob Sodowski =

Jacob Sodowski (Jakub Sądowski) was a Polish-American fur trader after whom Sandusky, Ohio, might have been named (see also Anthony Sadowski).

In 1770, Jacob Sodowski settled in New York, and his sons were among the first Slavic men to penetrate as far as Kentucky. It is said that Sandusky, Ohio, was named after him.

French maps as early as 1718 identified Sandusky Bay as Lac Sandouské.
