= Sadowo =

Sadowo may refer to the following places:

- Sadowo, Sochaczew County in Masovian Voivodeship (east-central Poland)
- Sadowo, Żuromin County in Masovian Voivodeship (east-central Poland)
- Sadowo, Podlaskie Voivodeship (north-east Poland)
- Sadowo, Lubusz Voivodeship (west Poland)
- Sadowo, Warmian-Masurian Voivodeship (north Poland)
- Sadowo, West Pomeranian Voivodeship (north-west Poland)
- Sądowo, Pomeranian Voivodeship (north Poland)

See also

- Sadow (disambiguation)
- Sadowa (disambiguation)
- Sadovo (disambiguation)
- Sadovy (disambiguation)
