= Buffalo Lake (Wright County, Minnesota) =

Lake in the state of Minnesota, United States

- Location within Minnesota Location within the United States
- Location: Wright County, Minnesota
- Coordinates: 45°9′46″N 93°53′35″W
- Type: Lake
- Surface elevation: 912 feet (278 m)

Buffalo Lake is a lake in Wright County, in the U.S. state of Minnesota.

Buffalo Lake was named for its former abundance of buffalo fish.

== See also ==
- List of lakes of Minnesota
