= Lake Pulaski =

Lake in the state of Minnesota, United States

- Location within Minnesota
- Location: Wright County, Minnesota
- Coordinates: 45°11′54″N 93°51′15″W
- Type: lake

Lake Pulaski is a lake located in Wright County, in the U.S. state of Minnesota.

Lake Pulaski was named for Casimir Pulaski, a Polish military commander and American Revolutionary War hero.

== See also ==
- List of lakes in Minnesota
