= Zaleski State Forest =

Ohio state forest

Coordinates: 39°18′N 82°24′W

- Zaleski Forest
- IUCN category V (protected landscape/seascape)
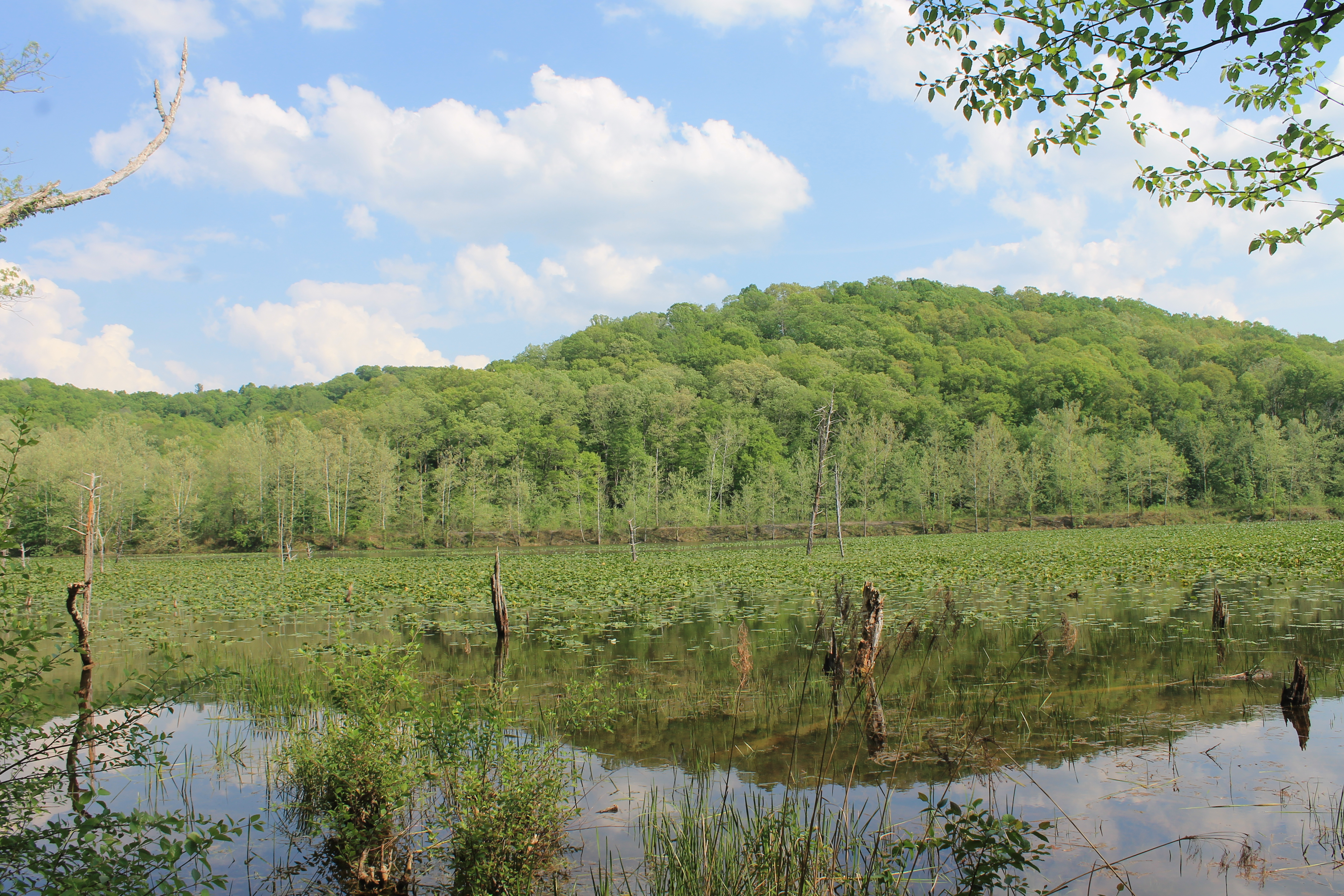
- View from a hiking trail in the forest
- Location: Vinton County and Athens County, Ohio
- Nearest city: Wellston, OH
- Area: 28,000 acres (110 km^{2})
- Governing body: Ohio Department of Natural Resources

Zaleski State Forest is a state forest in the U.S. state of Ohio, located primarily in Vinton County, with areas in Athens County as well. The 28,000 acre (110 km^{2}) forest surrounds Lake Hope State Park in Vinton County, and borders the Waterloo Wildlife Research Station in Athens County.

Part of the Zaleski Mound Group, a group of Native American mounds built by the prehistoric Adena culture, is located within the forest.

Quercus alba (white oak) from the forest was used extensively in Ohio State University's 2008 renovation of William Oxley Thompson Memorial Library

The forest is located in the rugged hills of the unglaciated Allegheny Plateau in Southern Ohio, with elevations ranging up to about 1100 feet above sea level. The historic Hope Furnace can be seen at Lake Hope State Park, just across the road from the forest.
