= Zaleski, Ohio =

- Village
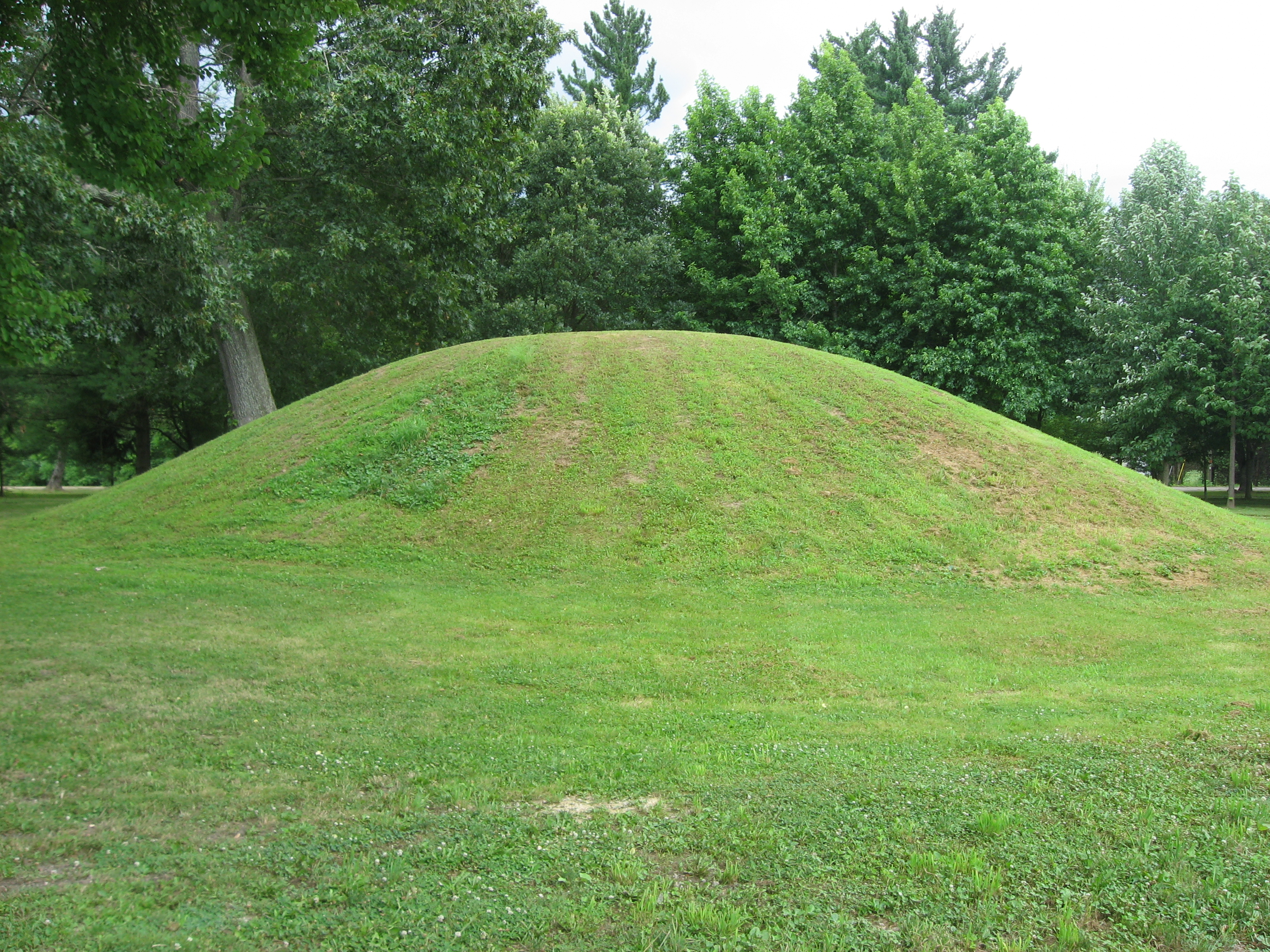
- Ranger Station Mound, southern side
- Interactive map of Zaleski, Ohio
- Coordinates: 39°16′5″N 82°23′8″W
- Country: United States
- State: Ohio
- County: Vinton

Area
  - Total: 0.57 sq mi (1.5 km^{2})
  - Land: 0.57 sq mi (1.5 km^{2})
  - Water: 0.00 sq mi (0 km^{2})
- Elevation: 728 ft (222 m)

Population (2020)
  - Total: 230
- Time zone: UTC-5 (Eastern (EST))
  - Summer (DST): UTC-4 (EDT)
- ZIP code: 45698
- Area code: 740
- GNIS feature ID: 1065403

Zaleski is a village in Vinton County, Ohio, United States. The population was 230 at the 2020 census. Zaleski lies within the heavily forested and scenic portion of southeastern Ohio and borders the Zaleski State Forest.

== History ==
The village of Zaleski was platted in 1856 and named after Peter Zaleski, a Polish-born official of the Steubenville and Indiana Railroad. It was incorporated in 1875. Zaleski developed quickly as a center of iron production and timber, anchored by its location near Hope Furnace and the Hocking Canal.

The area includes numerous prehistoric Adena earthworks, including the nearby Zaleski Mound Group.

== Geography ==
According to the United States Census Bureau, the village has a total area of 0.57 square miles (1.48 km²), all land. The surrounding terrain is hilly and part of the unglaciated Allegheny Plateau.

Zaleski lies within the drainage basin of Raccoon Creek and borders the 28,000-acre Zaleski State Forest, Ohio’s second-largest state forest.

== Demographics ==
As of the 2020 census, there were 230 people living in Zaleski. The village remains a small and historically preserved community.

== Economy and recreation ==
Zaleski benefits from outdoor tourism, hunting, hiking, and state forest visitation. The Moonville Rail Trail, a multi-use path built on a former rail line, begins near Zaleski and includes the historic Moonville Tunnel.

== Notable landmarks ==
- Hope Furnace—A restored charcoal iron furnace site and interpretive trail, part of Zaleski State Forest
- Zaleski Mound Group—A series of Adena mounds near the village
- Zaleski Masonic Lodge No. 472—Listed on the National Register of Historic Places

== See also ==
- Zaleski State Forest
- Hope Furnace
- List of villages in Ohio
