= Point Pleasant micropolitan area =

The Point Pleasant Micropolitan Statistical Area, as defined by the United States Census Bureau, is an area consisting of two counties – one in West Virginia and one in Ohio – anchored by the city of Point Pleasant, West Virginia.

As of the 2000 census, the Point Pleasant MSA had a population of 57,026 (though a July 1, 2009 estimate placed the population at 56,252).

== Counties ==
- Mason County, West Virginia
- Gallia County, Ohio

== Communities ==
- Places with more than 1,000 inhabitants
  - Gallipolis, Ohio
  - Point Pleasant, West Virginia (Principal city)
  - Mason, West Virginia
  - New Haven, West Virginia
- Places with 500 to 1,000 inhabitants
  - Hartford City, West Virginia
  - Rio Grande, Ohio
- Places with less than 500 inhabitants
  - Centerville, Ohio
  - Cheshire, Ohio
  - Crown City, Ohio
  - Henderson, West Virginia
  - Leon, West Virginia
  - Vinton, Ohio
- Unincorporated places
  - Apple Grove, West Virginia
  - Bidwell, Ohio
  - Gallipolis Ferry, West Virginia
  - Glenwood, West Virginia
  - Kerr, Ohio
  - Letart, West Virginia
  - Patriot, Ohio
- Townships (Gallia County, Ohio)
  - Addison
  - Cheshire
  - Clay
  - Gallipolis
  - Green
  - Greenfield
  - Guyan
  - Harrison
  - Huntington
  - Morgan
  - Ohio
  - Perry
  - Raccoon
  - Springfield
  - Walnut

== Demographics ==
As of the census of 2000, there were 57,026 people, 22,647 households, and 16,155 families residing within the μSA. The racial makeup of the μSA was 96.67% White, 1.70% African American, 0.32% Native American, 0.32% Asian, 0.004% Pacific Islander, 0.13% from other races, and 0.86% from two or more races. Hispanic or Latino of any race were 0.55% of the population.

The median income for a household in the μSA was $28,663, and the median income for a family was $34,446. Males had a median income of $32,083 versus $19,952 for females. The per capita income for the μSA was $14,994.

== See also ==
- West Virginia census statistical areas
- Ohio census statistical areas
