= Ohio State Route 233 =

State highway in southeastern Ohio, US

State Route 233

Route information
- Maintained by ODOT
- Length: 12.29 mi (19.78 km)
- Existed: 1924–present

Major junctions
- West end: SR 93 / SR 279 in Oak Hill
- East end: SR 141 near Patriot

Location
- Country: United States
- State: Ohio
- Counties: Jackson, Gallia

Highway system
- Ohio State Highway System; Interstate; US; State; Scenic
← SR 232	→ SR 234

State Route 233 (SR 233) is an east–west state highway in the southeastern portion of Ohio, a U.S. state. The western terminus of State Route 233 is at a signalized intersection in Oak Hill where it meets the duplex of State Route 93 and State Route 279. The eastern terminus of this state route is at a T-intersection with State Route 141 in the heart of the Wayne National Forest approximately 4 miles (6.4 km) northwest of the unincorporated community of Patriot.

Formed in the middle of the 1920s, State Route 233's path takes it through southeastern Jackson County and western Gallia County. The entire length of State Route 233 is included as a part of the Welsh Byway, an officially designated National Scenic Byway.

== Route description ==
State Route 233 passes through portions of the counties of Jackson and Gallia along its journey. The route is not included as a part of the National Highway System, a network of highways deemed most imperative for the nation's economy, mobility and defense.

== History ==
State Route 233 was first designated in 1924 along the routing that it maintains to this day through Jackson and Gallia Counties. No changes of major significance have taken place to this state highway since its designation.

== Major intersections ==
County	Location	mi	km	Destinations	Notes
Jackson	Oak Hill	0.00	0.00	SR 93 / SR 279 (Front Street) / Main Street	
Gallia	Perry Township	12.29	19.78	SR 141 – Gallipolis, Ironton	
1.000 mi = 1.609 km; 1.000 km = 0.621 mi
