= Ohio State Route 279 =

State highway in southern Ohio, US

State Route 279

Route information
- Maintained by ODOT
- Length: 20.11 mi (32.36 km)
- Existed: 1930–present

Major junctions
- West end: SR 139 near South Webster
- East end: US 35 near Centerville

Location
- Country: United States
- State: Ohio
- Counties: Jackson, Gallia

Highway system
- Ohio State Highway System; Interstate; US; State; Scenic
← SR 278	→ I-280

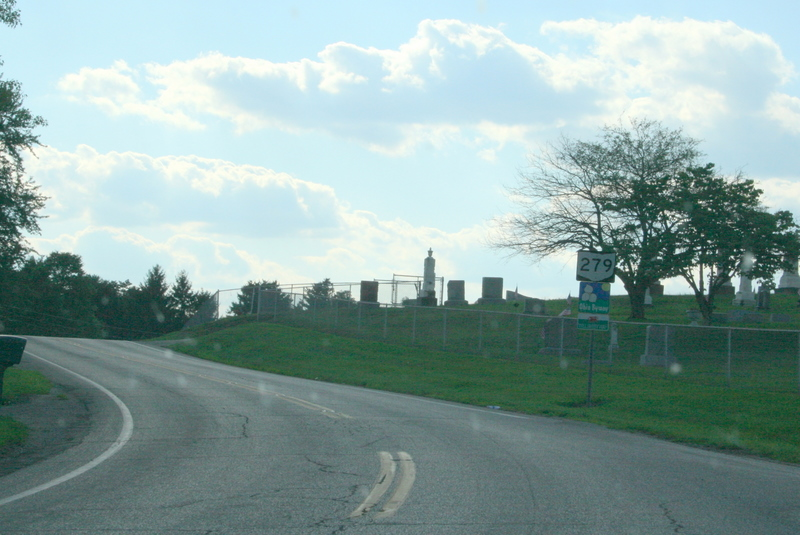
A view of SR 279 just east of Oak Hill with Ohio Byways and Welsh Byway Signs

State Route 279 (SR 279) is a 20.11-mile-long (32.36 km) east–west state highway in the southern portion of the U.S. state of Ohio. The western terminus of SR 279 is at a T-intersection with SR 139 nearly 5.25 miles (8.45 km) northwest of South Webster. Its eastern terminus is at a T-intersection with U.S. Route 35 (US 35) approximately 0.25 miles (0.40 km) east of the village of Centerville.

== Route description ==
SR 279 travels through the southern portion of Jackson County and a very small portion of western Gallia County. There are no sections of SR 279 that are included as a part of the National Highway System (NHS). The NHS is a network of highways identified as being most important for the economy, mobility and defense of the country.

== History ==
The SR 279 designation was applied in 1930. Originally, the highway was routed along much its present easternmost segment, running from Oak Hill to Centerville, which at the time was known as Thurman. In 1939, SR 279 was extended west of Oak Hill along a previously un-numbered roadway into southwestern Jackson County to its present terminus at SR 139.

== Major intersections ==
County	Location	mi	km	Destinations	Notes
Jackson	Hamilton Township	0.00	0.00	SR 139	
Jackson	Oak Hill	11.45	18.43	SR 93 south (Front Street) / Maple Street	Western end of SR 93 concurrency
Jackson	Oak Hill	11.58	18.64	SR 233 east (Main Street)	Western terminus of SR 233
Jackson	Oak Hill	11.86	19.09	SR 93 north (Front Street)	Eastern end of SR 93 concurrency
Gallia	Raccoon Township	20.11	32.36	US 35 – Jackson, Rio Grande	
1.000 mi = 1.609 km; 1.000 km = 0.621 mi: Concurrency terminus
