= William J. Thornton =

American politician in Illinois (1878–1951)

William Jefferson Thornton (January 11, 1878 – May 5, 1951) was an American politician and businessman.

Thornton was born in Patriot, Ohio and went to the local public schools. He taught school in Ohio. In 1898, Thornton moved to Illinois and settled in Nebo, Illinois. He continued to teach school, and then worked in the Bank of Nebo as a cashier. Thornton was also involved in the real estate business. He served as the postmaster of the Nebo Post Office and also worked as an investigator for the Illinois Department of Revenue. He served as a supervisor of the Spring Creek Township, Pike County, Illinois for four years. Thornton served in the Illinois House of Representatives from 1949 until his death in 1951. Thornton was a Republican. Thornton died at the Illini Hospital in Pittsfield, Illinois.
