= Green Township, Ohio =

Green Township, Ohio may refer to the following places in the U.S. state of Ohio:

- Green Township, Adams County, Ohio
- Green Township, Ashland County, Ohio
- Green Township, Brown County, Ohio
- Green Township, Clark County, Ohio
- Green Township, Clinton County, Ohio
- Green Township, Fayette County, Ohio
- Green Township, Gallia County, Ohio
- Green Township, Hamilton County, Ohio
- Green Township, Harrison County, Ohio
- Green Township, Hocking County, Ohio
- Green Township, Mahoning County, Ohio
- Green Township, Monroe County, Ohio
- Green Township, Ross County, Ohio
- Green Township, Scioto County, Ohio
- Green Township, Shelby County, Ohio
- Green Township, Wayne County, Ohio

== See also ==
- Green, Ohio, formerly Green Township, Summit County
- Green Camp Township, Marion County, Ohio
- Green Creek Township, Sandusky County, Ohio
- Greene Township, Trumbull County, Ohio
- Greenfield Township, Fairfield County, Ohio
- Greenfield Township, Gallia County, Ohio
- Greenfield Township, Huron County, Ohio
- Greensburg Township, Putnam County, Ohio
- Greenville Township, Darke County, Ohio
- Greenwich Township, Huron County, Ohio
