= Ohio Township, Ohio =

Ohio Township, Ohio may refer to:

- Ohio Township, Clermont County, Ohio
- Ohio Township, Gallia County, Ohio
- Ohio Township, Monroe County, Ohio
