= Grandma Gatewood =

American hiker (1887–1973)

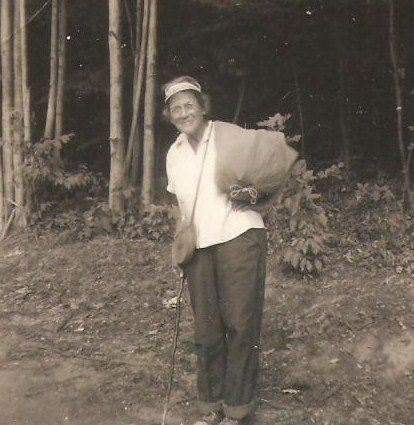
- Born: Emma Rowena Caldwell; October 25, 1887; Mercerville, Guyan Township, Gallia County, Ohio, U.S.
- Died: June 4, 1973 (aged 85); Gallipolis, Ohio, U.S.
- Resting place: Ohio Valley Memory Gardens
- Known for: Hiking the Appalachian Trail and the Oregon Trail
- Spouse: Perry Clayton Gatewood (m. 1907; div. 1941)
- Children: 11

Emma Rowena Gatewood (née Caldwell; October 25, 1887 – June 4, 1973), better known as Grandma Gatewood, was an American ultra-light hiking pioneer. After a difficult life as a farm wife, mother of eleven children, and survivor of domestic violence, she became famous as the first solo female thru-hiker of the 2,168-mile (3,489 km) Appalachian Trail (A.T.) in 1955 at the age of 67. She subsequently became the first person (male or female) to hike the A.T. three times, after completing a second thru-hike two years later, followed by a section-hike in 1964. In the meantime, she hiked 2,000 miles (3,200 km) of the Oregon Trail in 1959. In her later years, she continued to travel and hike and worked on a section of what would become the Buckeye Trail. The media coverage surrounding her feats was credited for generating interest in maintaining the A.T. and in hiking generally. Among many other honors, she was posthumously inducted into the Appalachian Trail Hall of Fame in 2012.

== Biography ==
=== Early life and education ===
Gatewood was born to a family of 15 children in Guyan Township, Gallia County, Ohio. Her father Hugh Caldwell, a farmer, turned to a life of drinking and gambling after his leg was amputated in the Civil War. The child-rearing of the family was left to her mother Evelyn (Trowbridge) Caldwell. Emma and her siblings slept four to a bed in their log cabin. Her formal education ended with the eighth grade, but she enjoyed reading encyclopedias and the Greek classics and taught herself about wildlife and woodland plants that could be used as medicines and food. She also enjoyed writing poetry.

=== Marriage and children ===
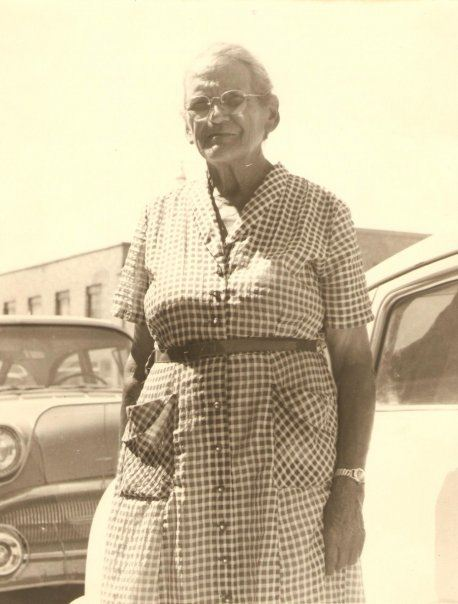
Emma Gatewood

On May 5, 1907, at the age of 19, she married 27-year-old Perry Clayton (P. C.) Gatewood, a college-educated primary school teacher and later a tobacco farmer, with whom she had 11 children. Almost immediately her husband set her to work burning tobacco beds, building fences, and mixing cement, in addition to her expected housework duties.

Although P. C. was recognized in the community as a man of above-average intellect, behind closed doors he was violent and abusive. Within months of the wedding, he started to beat his wife, a vicious pattern that continued for the duration of their marriage. In 1924, he was convicted of manslaughter after killing a man during an argument. He was ordered to pay restitution to the widow of the victim, but his prison sentence was suspended because he had nine children and a farm to take care of. Emma recalled being beaten nearly to death on several occasions. When her husband became violent, she would often run into the woods, where she found peace and solitude.

In 1939, after yet another violent fight, P. C. arranged to have his wife arrested and jailed. Seeing her with broken teeth and a cracked rib, the town mayor took her in and found her a job. She filed for divorce in September 1940, and in February 1941, she testified against her husband in a hearing that resulted in the divorce being granted, giving her custody of the three children still at home and with alimony to be paid by P. C. This was at a time when divorce was difficult, and after her husband had repeatedly threatened to have her committed to an insane asylum as a means of maintaining control over her.

Six years later, she began working at various jobs, renovating her house, and writing poetry. By 1951, all of her children were on their own.

=== Hiking career ===
In the early 1950s, while reading a discarded copy of the August 1949 edition of National Geographic magazine, Gatewood found an article about the Appalachian Trail. The description and photographs captivated her, making it sound like something she could do. All that was needed was "normal good health" and "no special skill or training." She set out in July 1954 at the age of 66 to hike south from Mount Katahdin in Maine. After a few days, she got lost, broke her glasses, and ran out of food. The rangers who found her convinced her to return home, but she decided not to tell anyone about her failure.

The following year, at the age of 67, Gatewood told her grown children that she was going for a walk. They did not ask where or for how long, as they knew she was resilient and would take care of herself. This time, she started earlier in the year and walked north from Mount Oglethorpe in Georgia beginning on May 3, 1955, and ending 146 days later on September 25 at Mount Katahdin. At the top of Baxter Peak, she signed the register, sang the first verse of the song "America the Beautiful" and spoke out loud, "I did it. I said I'd do it and I've done it."

Because the National Geographic magazine article had given her the impression of easy walks and clean cabins at the end of each day's expedition, she took little in the way of outdoor gear – no tent or sleeping bag, just a shower curtain to keep the rain off. She wore canvas Keds shoes on her misshapen feet and carried a small notebook, some clothes, and food in a homemade denim bag slung over one shoulder. When she couldn't find shelter, she slept on piles of leaves. On cold nights, she heated large flat stones to use as a warm bed. She ate berries and other edible forest plants she recognized when she ran out of food.

Local newspapers began picking up on her story in late June, beginning in Virginia with an article in The Roanoke Times. Then the Associated Press did a national profile of her while she was in Maryland, leading to an article in Sports Illustrated when she reached Connecticut. This publicity made her a celebrity even before the hike was over; she was often recognized and received "trail magic" (assistance from strangers) in the form of friends, food and places to sleep.

After the hike, Sports Illustrated ran a follow-up article describing her experiences on the trail. She was quoted as saying that, based on the National Geographic article's rosy descriptions, she thought "it would be a nice lark. It wasn't." She continued, "This is no trail. This is a nightmare. For some fool reason, they always lead you right up over the biggest rock to the top of the biggest mountain they can find." Newspapers across the United States, including The Baltimore Sun, carried articles about the "jovial little grandmother" who conquered the Appalachian Trail. In addition, she was invited as the featured guest on the news and talk television program the Today Show with Dave Garroway and won two hundred dollars on the televised quiz show Welcome Travelers. In June 1956, U.S. Representative Thomas A. Jenkins of Ohio entered a description of Gatewood's accomplishments and subsequent publicity in the Congressional Record.

Gatewood thru-hiked the Appalachian Trail again in 1957. She reported that the trail was in better condition that year due to the efforts of local hiking clubs to clean and mark parts of it. She was invited to speak to students and various civic groups about her experiences. In addition, she spent time with Girl Scouts and 4-H members at their camps. In 1958, she climbed six mountains in the Adirondack Mountains of New York.

In 1959, at the age of 71, she was inspired by publicity about the Oregon Centennial Exposition to walk the 2,000 miles (3,200 km) of the Oregon Trail by herself, following in the footsteps of the pioneer women who had walked the route behind covered wagons one hundred years earlier. The trip took her three months from Independence, Missouri, to Portland, Oregon, averaging 22 miles (35 km) a day. Her arrival in Portland was celebrated as Grandma Gatewood Day. Among her many gifts and accolades were trips to Hollywood for guest appearances on the television programs Art Linkletter's House Party and You Bet Your Life with Groucho Marx.

Gatewood completed her third hike of the A.T., this time in sections, in 1964 at age 76, making her the first person to complete the trail three times. She was also credited with being the oldest female thru-hiker by the Appalachian Trail Conference.

Every January beginning in 1967, she led a six-mile hike through Hocking Hills State Park in Ohio. For her last hike in 1973, more than 2,500 hikers showed up. The annual hike has become even more popular over the years; in January 2013, more than 4,000 people joined in.

When she was in her early eighties, she spent ten or more hours a day clearing and marking a 30-mile hiking trail through Gallia County, Ohio that would later be connected to the Buckeye Trail. In 1973, shortly before her death, she took a lengthy bus trip with an open-ended ticket, visiting all of the contiguous United States, plus three Canadian provinces.

Gatewood was a life member of the National Campers and Hikers Association and the Roanoke Appalachian Trail Club. She was one of the founding members, Director Emeritus, and a lifetime member of the Buckeye Trail Association. By the end of her life, she had walked more than 14,000 miles (23,000 km), or the equivalent of more than halfway around the Earth.

=== Death and funeral ===
At the time of her death at age 85 from a heart attack, Gatewood had one surviving sister plus 66 living descendants: 11 children, 24 grandchildren, 30 great-grandchildren, and one great-great-grandchild. Her funeral was held at the Waugh-Halley-Wood Funeral Home, and she was buried in Ohio Valley Memory Gardens. Her grave marker says simply "Emma R. Gatewood – Grandma."

== Honors and legacy ==
Gatewood received numerous honors during her lifetime, and her legacy lives on through various tributes, artistic works, and other commemorative projects.

- In her last few years, Gatewood received several awards, including the Ohio State Conservation Award and the Governor's Community Action Award. Upon her death, the Ohio Senate passed a resolution in her memory.
- In Hocking Hills State Park in Ohio – where the North Country Trail, the Buckeye Trail, and the American Discovery Trail coincide – a six-mile section connecting Old Man's Cave to Cedar Falls to Ash Cave was designated as the Grandma Gatewood Memorial Trail in January 1981.
- The Appalachian Trail Museum includes exhibits about her, and in June 2012, she was inducted into the museum's Appalachian Trail Hall of Fame.
- She has been the subject of various projects, including a story-telling program (2011), a one-act play (2013), and picture albums designed by Eden Valley Enterprises.
- Trail Magic: The Grandma Gatewood Story, which premiered in May 2015 and was shown on the Public Broadcasting System in 2016, is an Emmy Award-nominated 60-minute documentary by filmmaker Peter Huston.
- Jeff & Paige, a children's music duo based in Boulder, Colorado, released a song in her honor, titled "Grandma Gatewood", on their 2015 album "Mighty Wolf".
- The village of Cheshire, Ohio, together with the Buckeye Trail Association and the Ohio History Connection, dedicated a historical marker in her memory on May 28, 2016. The front of the marker is a summary of her accomplishments. On the reverse side is a poem entitled The Reward of Nature, which is believed to have been written by Gatewood during one of her hikes of the A.T.
- In 2018, her story was retold in the New York Times Overlooked series, which adds stories of remarkable people whose deaths went unreported in the historically male-dominated obituaries of the Times. The piece details her hiking accomplishments and abusive family life.
- She inspired the Gatewood Cape, a lightweight rain cape and shelter combination.
- "Grandma Gatewood Took a Walk" by Catherine Bush made its debut in 2023 at the Appalachian Festival of Plays and Playwrights (AFPP) as a reading, followed by a full-length production debuting at Barter Theatre on May 12, 2024, and was produced again in 2025 and 2026.

== Biographies ==
- Montgomery, Ben (2014). Grandma Gatewood's Walk: The Inspiring Story of the Woman Who Saved the Appalachian Trail. Chicago Review Press. ISBN 978-1613747186.
- Houts, Michelle (2016). When Grandma Gatewood Took a Hike. Ohio University Press. ISBN 978-0-8214-2235-9.
- Trail Magic: The Grandma Gatewood Story (PBS documentary). Eden Valley Enterprises and FilmAffects.
- Thermes, Jennifer (2018). Grandma Gatewood Hikes the Appalachian Trail. New York, NY: Abrams Books for Young Readers. ISBN 978-1-4197-2839-6.
- Boyer Sagert, Kelly (2012–2015). Grandma Gatewood: Ohio's Legendary Hiker. Elyria, Ohio: Eden Valley Enterprises. ISBN 978-1-98-297098-7.
- Seeds Nash, Katherine (2018). Grandma Gatewood – Trail Tales: Appalachian Trail. Springboro, Ohio: Braughler Books LLC. ISBN 9780982218709.
- Seeds Nash, Katherine (2018). Grandma Gatewood – Trail Tales: A is for Appalachian Trail. Springboro, Ohio: Braughler Books LLC. ISBN 9781945091971.
