= Harrison Township, Gallia County, Ohio =

Township in Ohio, US

- Township
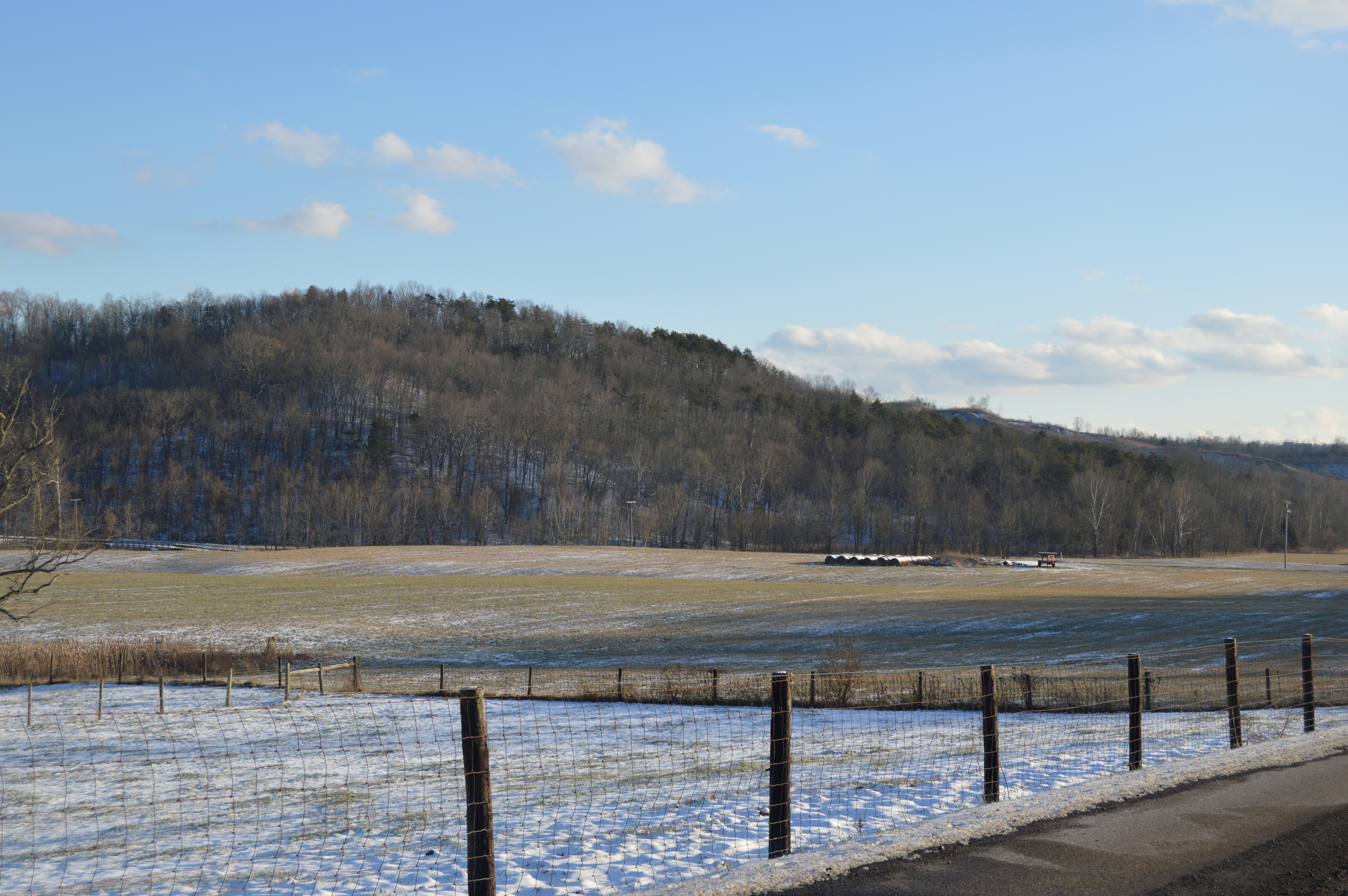
- Agricultural scene south of Northup

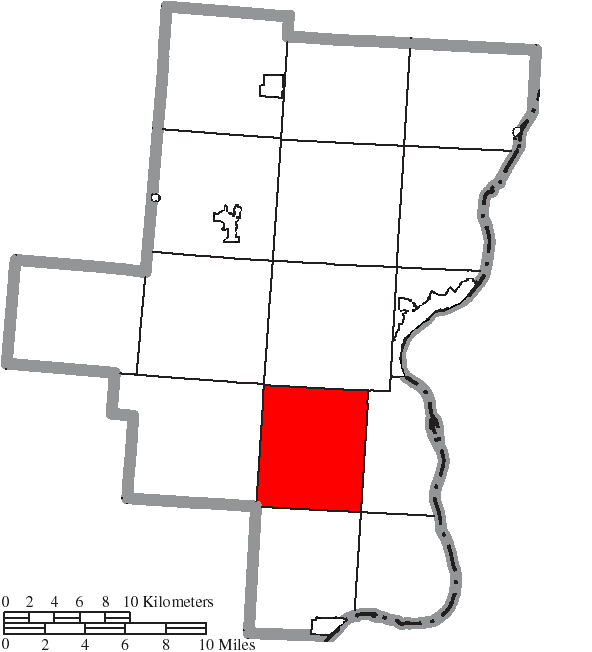
- Location of Harrison Township in Gallia County
- Coordinates: 38°43′19″N 82°17′43″W
- Country: United States
- State: Ohio
- County: Gallia

Area
  - Total: 31.3 sq mi (81.0 km^{2})
  - Land: 31.2 sq mi (80.8 km^{2})
  - Water: 0.12 sq mi (0.3 km^{2})
- Elevation: 850 ft (260 m)

Population (2020)
  - Total: 959
  - Density: 30.7/sq mi (11.9/km^{2})
- Time zone: UTC-5 (Eastern (EST))
  - Summer (DST): UTC-4 (EDT)
- FIPS code: 39-33824
- GNIS feature ID: 1086139

Harrison Township is one of the fifteen townships of Gallia County, Ohio, United States. As of the 2020 census the population was 959.

== Geography ==
Located in the southern part of the county, it borders the following townships:

- Green Township - north
- Clay Township - east
- Ohio Township - southeast corner
- Guyan Township - south
- Mason Township, Lawrence County - southwest corner
- Walnut Township - west
- Perry Township - northwest corner

No municipalities are located in Harrison Township.

== Name and history ==
It is one of nineteen Harrison Townships statewide.

== Government ==
The township is governed by a three-member board of trustees, who are elected in November of odd-numbered years to a four-year term beginning on the following January 1. Two are elected in the year after the presidential election and one is elected in the year before it. There is also an elected township fiscal officer, who serves a four-year term beginning on April 1 of the year after the election, which is held in November of the year before the presidential election. Vacancies in the fiscal officership or on the board of trustees are filled by the remaining trustees.

== Public services ==
=== Education ===
The bulk of the township is served by the Gallia County Local School District, except for a small area in the northern extremity of the township, which lies within the Gallipolis City School District.

=== Transportation ===
The township is served by State Routes 218 and 790. Hannan Trace Road, one of the oldest roads in Ohio, having originally been laid out in 1798 by Thomas Hannan under contract with the federal government, is also one of the main roads in the township. It was originally one of the main highways connecting Chillicothe and points east during the time period when Chillicothe served as the capital of the Northwest Territory and the first capital of Ohio.
