= Ohio State Route 234 =

State Route 234

Route information
- Maintained by ODOT

Location
- Country: United States
- State: Ohio

Highway system
- Ohio State Highway System; Interstate; US; State; Scenic
← SR 233	→ SR 235

In Ohio, State Route 234 may refer to:

- Ohio State Route 234 (1920s), now part of SR 93
- Ohio State Route 234 (1930s), now part of SR 60 and SR 754
