= Glenwood, Mason County, West Virginia =

Unincorporated community in West Virginia, United States

Glenwood, West Virginia
- Unincorporated community
- Location within West Virginia Location within the United States
- Coordinates: 38°35′30″N 82°11′12″W
- Country: United States
- State: West Virginia
- County: Mason
- Elevation: 554 ft (169 m)
- Time zone: UTC-5 (Eastern (EST))
  - Summer (DST): UTC-4 (EDT)
- ZIP codes: 25520
- Area codes: 304 & 681
- GNIS feature ID: 1539470

Glenwood is an unincorporated community and Ohio river town in Mason County, in the U.S. state of West Virginia. It is notable for the Haunted Plumley Mansion. The town can be found along West Virginia Route 2 south of Ashton.

The town's only gas station and premier stop is Trippett's Dandi-Mart, owned and operated Joseph Melton (Milt) Trippett, which has been in business for over 50 years.

A notable resident is the Catfish Man of the Woods.

The community is part of the Point Pleasant, WV–OH Micropolitan Statistical Area.
