= Centerville, Gallia County, Ohio =

Centerville, Ohio
- Village
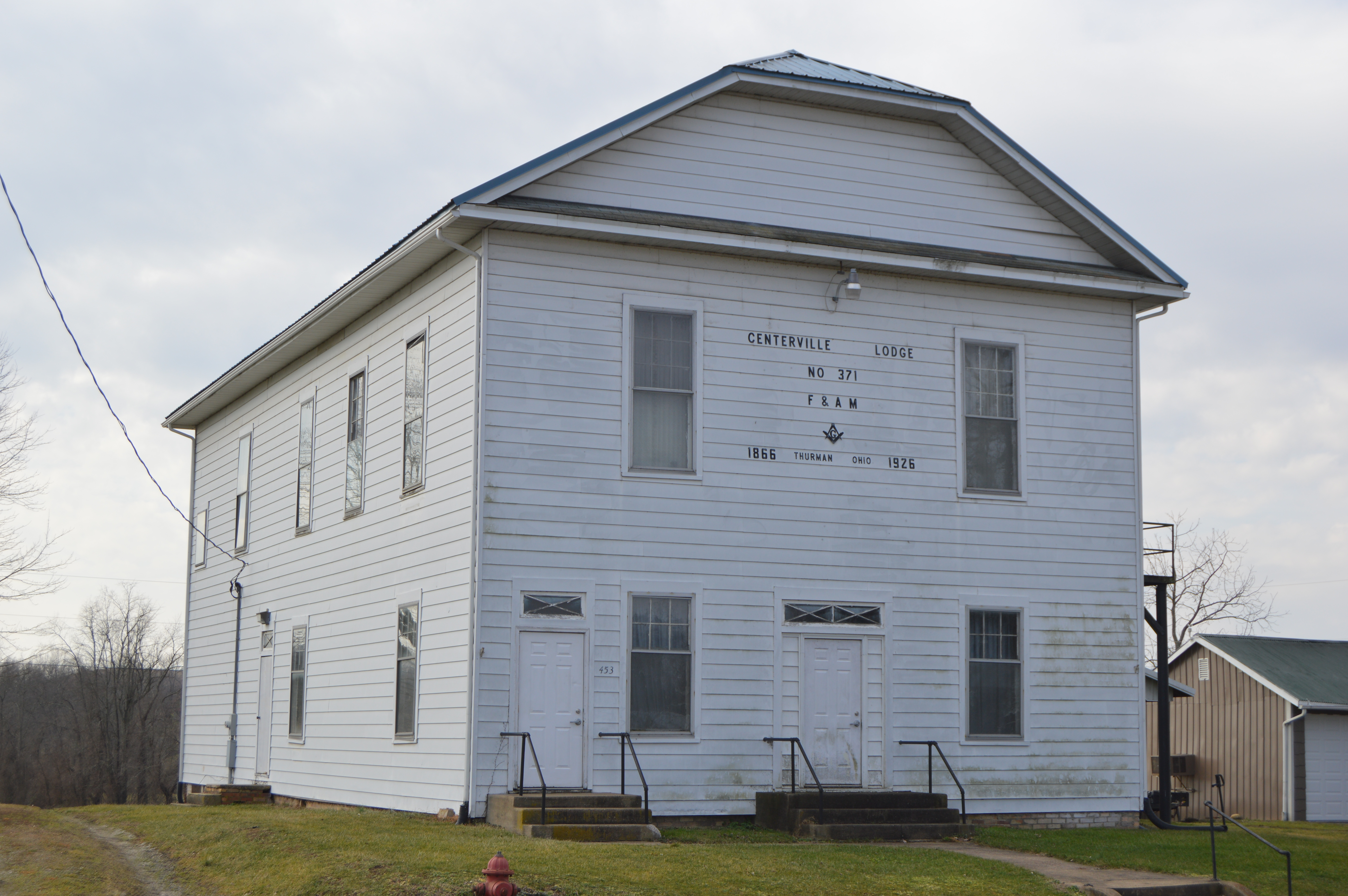
- Masonic lodge building on State Street

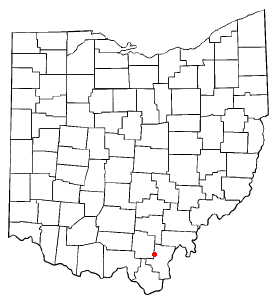
- Location of Centerville, Gallia County, Ohio

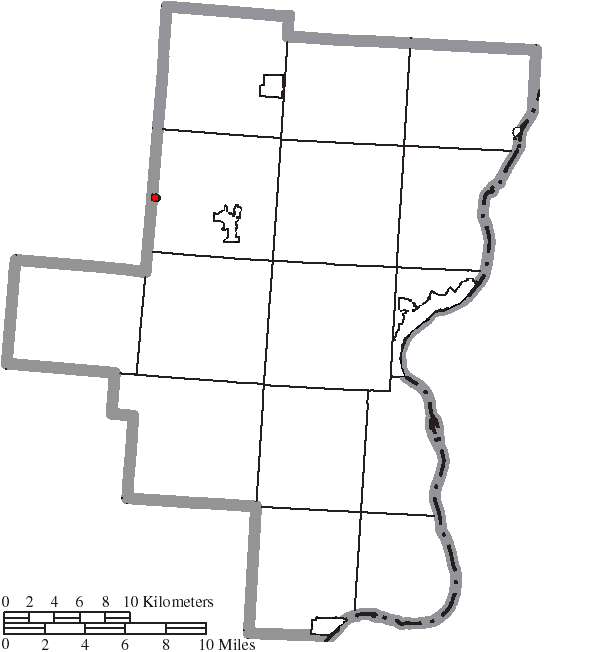
- Location of Centerville in Gallia County
- Coordinates: 38°53′53″N 82°26′45″W
- Country: United States
- State: Ohio
- County: Gallia
- Township: Raccoon

Area
  - Total: 0.10 sq mi (0.26 km^{2})
  - Land: 0.10 sq mi (0.26 km^{2})
  - Water: 0 sq mi (0.00 km^{2})
- Elevation: 676 ft (206 m)

Population (2020)
  - Total: 87
  - Estimate (2023): 87
  - Density: 867.8/sq mi (335.06/km^{2})
- Time zone: UTC-5 (Eastern (EST))
  - Summer (DST): UTC-4 (EDT)
- FIPS code: 39-13169
- GNIS feature ID: 1085657

Centerville, also known as Thurman, is a village in western Gallia County, Ohio, United States. The village lies adjacent to the Gallia–Jackson county line. It is located adjacent to U.S. Route 35 at the eastern terminus of State Route 279.

It is part of the rural Point Pleasant micropolitan area. The population was 87 at the 2020 census.

== Name ==
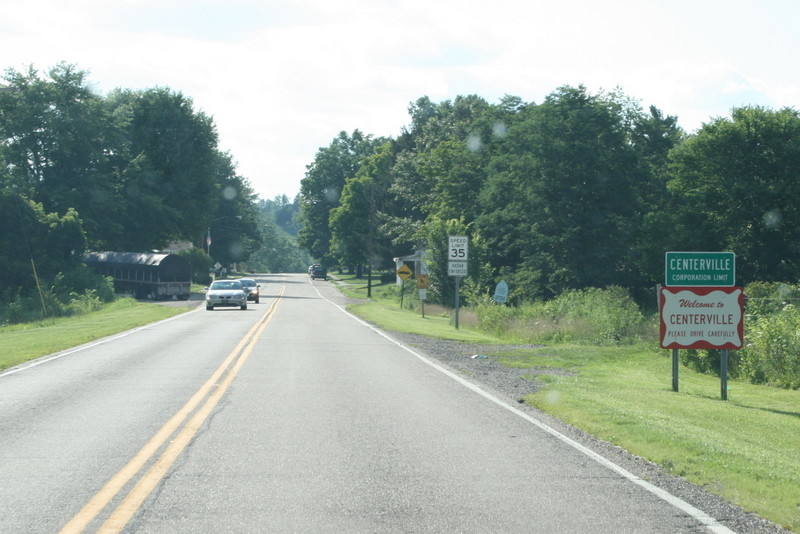
A view entering Centerville while traveling west on SR 279

Although the village is officially named "Centerville," it is also commonly known as "Thurman" — the name that the Board on Geographic Names ruled in favor of using to refer to the community — and as "Ridgeway." Its official name has also been spelled "Centreville."

== History ==
Centerville was platted in 1835. The community originally was settled chiefly by Welsh immigrants.

== Geography ==
According to the United States Census Bureau, the village has a total area of 0.10 square miles (0.26 km^{2}), all land.

== Demographics ==
Historical population
Census	Pop.	Note	%±
1880	272		—
1890	215		−21.0%
1900	198		−7.9%
1910	143		−27.8%
1920	96		−32.9%
1930	127		32.3%
1940	113		−11.0%
1950	142		25.7%
1960	251		76.8%
1970	114		−54.6%
1980	148		29.8%
1990	128		−13.5%
2000	134		4.7%
2010	103		−23.1%
2020	87		−15.5%
2023 (est.)	87		0.0%
U.S. Decennial Census

=== 2010 census ===
As of the census of 2010, there were 103 people, 43 households, and 31 families living in the village. The population density was 1,030.0 inhabitants per square mile (397.7/km^{2}). There were 52 housing units at an average density of 520.0 per square mile (200.8/km^{2}). The racial makeup of the village was 98.1% White, 1.0% African American, and 1.0% from two or more races.

There were 43 households, of which 18.6% had children under the age of 18 living with them, 53.5% were married couples living together, 7.0% had a female householder with no husband present, 11.6% had a male householder with no wife present, and 27.9% were non-families. 25.6% of all households were made up of individuals, and 11.7% had someone living alone who was 65 years of age or older. The average household size was 2.40 and the average family size was 2.87.

The median age in the village was 44.3 years. 12.6% of residents were under the age of 18; 12.7% were between the ages of 18 and 24; 28.2% were from 25 to 44; 24.4% were from 45 to 64; and 22.3% were 65 years of age or older. The gender makeup of the village was 52.4% male and 47.6% female.

=== 2000 census ===
As of the census of 2000, there were 134 people, 50 households, and 40 families living in the village. The population density was 1,350.8 inhabitants per square mile (521.5/km^{2}). There were 52 housing units at an average density of 524.2 per square mile (202.4/km^{2}). The racial makeup of the village was 96.27% White, 0.75% African American, and 2.99% from two or more races.

There were 50 households, out of which 40.0% had children under the age of 18 living with them, 68.0% were married couples living together, 6.0% had a female householder with no husband present, and 20.0% were non-families. 16.0% of all households were made up of individuals, and 8.0% had someone living alone who was 65 years of age or older. The average household size was 2.68 and the average family size was 3.03.

In the village, the population was spread out, with 27.6% under the age of 18, 9.7% from 18 to 24, 21.6% from 25 to 44, 26.9% from 45 to 64, and 14.2% who were 65 years of age or older. The median age was 37 years. For every 100 females there were 103.0 males. For every 100 females age 18 and over, there were 94.0 males.

The median income for a household in the village was $35,625, and the median income for a family was $35,938. Males had a median income of $36,250 versus $20,833 for females. The per capita income for the village was $15,169. There were 20.0% of families and 15.4% of the population living below the poverty line, including 10.9% of under eighteens and 20.0% of those over 64.

== Education ==
Public education in the village of Centerville is provided by the Gallia County Local School District.
