= Gallipolis Ferry, West Virginia =

- Census-designated place
- Location within West Virginia
- Coordinates: 38°46′14″N 82°11′56″W
- Country: United States
- State: West Virginia
- County: Mason

Area
  - Total: 2.771 sq mi (7.18 km^{2})
  - Land: 2.275 sq mi (5.89 km^{2})
  - Water: 0.496 sq mi (1.28 km^{2})
- Elevation: 594 ft (181 m)

Population (2020)
  - Total: 735
  - Density: 323/sq mi (125/km^{2})
- Time zone: UTC-5 (Eastern (EST))
  - Summer (DST): UTC-4 (EDT)
- ZIP code: 25515
- Area codes: 304 & 681
- GNIS feature ID: 1554524

Gallipolis Ferry is a census-designated place (CDP) in Mason County, West Virginia, United States. It is situated on the Ohio River along West Virginia Route 2. As of the 2020 census, its population was 735 (down from 817 at the 2010 census). It is the site of the Robert C. Byrd Locks & Dam on the Ohio. The community was named for the fact a ferry once provided service between the town site and nearby Gallipolis, Ohio.

The community is part of the Point Pleasant, WV–OH Micropolitan Statistical Area.
