= Nebo, Illinois =

Nebo
- Village
- Location of Nebo in Pike County, Illinois.
- Coordinates: 39°26′32″N 90°47′17″W
- Country: United States
- State: Illinois
- County: Pike

Area
  - Total: 0.44 sq mi (1.14 km^{2})
  - Land: 0.43 sq mi (1.12 km^{2})
  - Water: 0.0077 sq mi (0.02 km^{2})
- Elevation: 482 ft (147 m)

Population (2020)
  - Total: 282
  - Density: 650/sq mi (251.1/km^{2})
- Time zone: UTC-6 (CST)
  - Summer (DST): UTC-5 (CDT)
- ZIP code: 62355
- Area code: 217
- FIPS code: 17-51882
- GNIS feature ID: 2399440

Nebo is a village in southern Pike County, Illinois, United States. As of the 2020 census, Nebo had a population of 282. Nebo has three churches scattered throughout the city limits.

== History ==
The first settlement in this area was by Silas Wilson, in 1832. This settlement was made on a piece of land north of the present day town. The first child was born soon after in 1835. The first post office was established in December 1852. The term "Nebo" is mentioned at various times in the Bible, which may be the namesake. In the late 1860s, a railroad was completed across Illinois and the present day town was constructed around it. Articles of incorporation were signed and presented to the Illinois state legislature in the year 1894. In 1899, a fire destroyed the entire business district on Nebo. The famous Vin Fiz Flyer landed north of the town in 1911. A bank was established in 1946. William J. Thornton (1878–1951), Illinois state representative, businessman, and postmaster, lived in Nebo.

== Geography ==
Nebo is located in Spring Creek Township.

According to the 2010 census, Nebo has a total area of 0.437 square miles (1.13 km^{2}), of which 0.43 square miles (1.11 km^{2}) (or 98.4%) is land and 0.007 square miles (0.02 km^{2}) (or 1.6%) is water.

== Demographics ==
Historical population
| Census | Pop. | Note | %± |
|---|---|---|---|
| 1880 | 136 | | — |
| 1890 | 453 | | 233.1% |
| 1900 | 508 | | 12.1% |
| 1910 | 520 | | 2.4% |
| 1920 | 549 | | 5.6% |
| 1930 | 484 | | −11.8% |
| 1940 | 521 | | 7.6% |
| 1950 | 413 | | −20.7% |
| 1960 | 441 | | 6.8% |
| 1970 | 454 | | 2.9% |
| 1980 | 487 | | 7.3% |
| 1990 | 402 | | −17.5% |
| 2000 | 408 | | 1.5% |
| 2010 | 340 | | −16.7% |
| 2020 | 282 | | −17.1% |
U.S. Decennial Census

As of the census of 2000, there were 408 people, 159 households, and 109 families residing in the village. The population density was 964.9 inhabitants per square mile (372.5/km^{2}). There were 183 housing units at an average density of 432.8 per square mile (167.1/km^{2}). The racial makeup of the village was 97.79% White, 0.74% Native American, and 1.47% from two or more races. Hispanic or Latino of any race were 1.96% of the population.

There were 159 households, out of which 37.7% had children under the age of 18 living with them, 48.4% were married couples living together, 11.3% had a female householder with no husband present, and 31.4% were non-families. 27.7% of all households were made up of individuals, and 12.6% had someone living alone who was 65 years of age or older. The average household size was 2.57 and the average family size was 3.17.

In the village, the population was spread out, with 30.6% under the age of 18, 8.1% from 18 to 24, 25.2% from 25 to 44, 23.3% from 45 to 64, and 12.7% who were 65 years of age or older. The median age was 35 years. For every 100 females, there were 105.0 males. For every 100 females age 18 and over, there were 103.6 males.

The median income for a household in the village was $29,000, and the median income for a family was $31,125. Males had a median income of $30,795 versus $15,000 for females. The per capita income for the village was $12,468. About 20.5% of families and 20.1% of the population were below the poverty line, including 24.6% of those under age 18 and 12.2% of those age 65 or over.

== Education ==
Nebo is served by Pikeland District 10.

== Festivals ==
- Nebo celebrates the landing of the Vin Fiz (the first plane to cross North America in 1911) with a festival every August.
