= Michelle Houts =

American writer

Michelle Houts is an American author of picture and chapter books for children.

== Personal life ==
Houts lives in Celina, Ohio.

== Books ==
- Sea Glass Summer (2019, Candlewick Press).
- When Grandma Gatewood Took a Hike. (2016, Ohio University Press), biography of extreme hiker Emma Rowena Gatewood. Chosen as a School Library Journal Best Picture Book of 2016.
- Kammie on First (2014, Ohio University Press), a biography of Dottie Kamenshek.
- Winterfrost (2014, Candlewick Press)
- Silent Swoop (2019, Dawn Publications)
- Count the Wings: The Life and Art of Charley Harper (2018, Ohio University Press), biography of mid-century modern artist Charley Harper
- Lucy's Lab, Book 1: Nuts About Science (2017, Sky Pony Press)
- Lucy's Lab, Book 2: Solids, Liquids, Guess Who's Got Gas (2017, Sky Pony Press)
- Lucy's Lab, Book 3: The Colossal Fossil Fiasco (2018, Sky Pony Press)
- The Beef Princess of Practical County (2009, Random House, Delacorte Press)
- The Practical County Drama Queen (2014, MuseItUp)
