= Kerr, Ohio =

Unincorporated community in Ohio, U.S.

Coordinates: 38°52′30″N 82°15′40″W

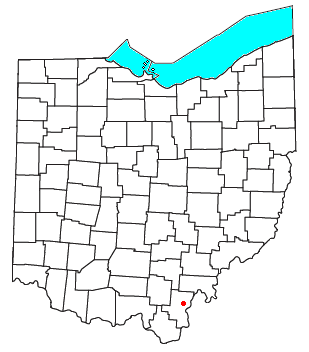
Location of Kerr, Ohio

Kerr is an unincorporated community in southeastern Springfield Township, Gallia County, Ohio, United States. It has a post office with the ZIP code 45643.

Kerr is part of the Point Pleasant, WV-OH Micropolitan Statistical Area. Public education in the community of Kerr is provided by the Gallia County Local School District.
