= Clay Township, Gallia County, Ohio =

Township in Ohio, US

- Township
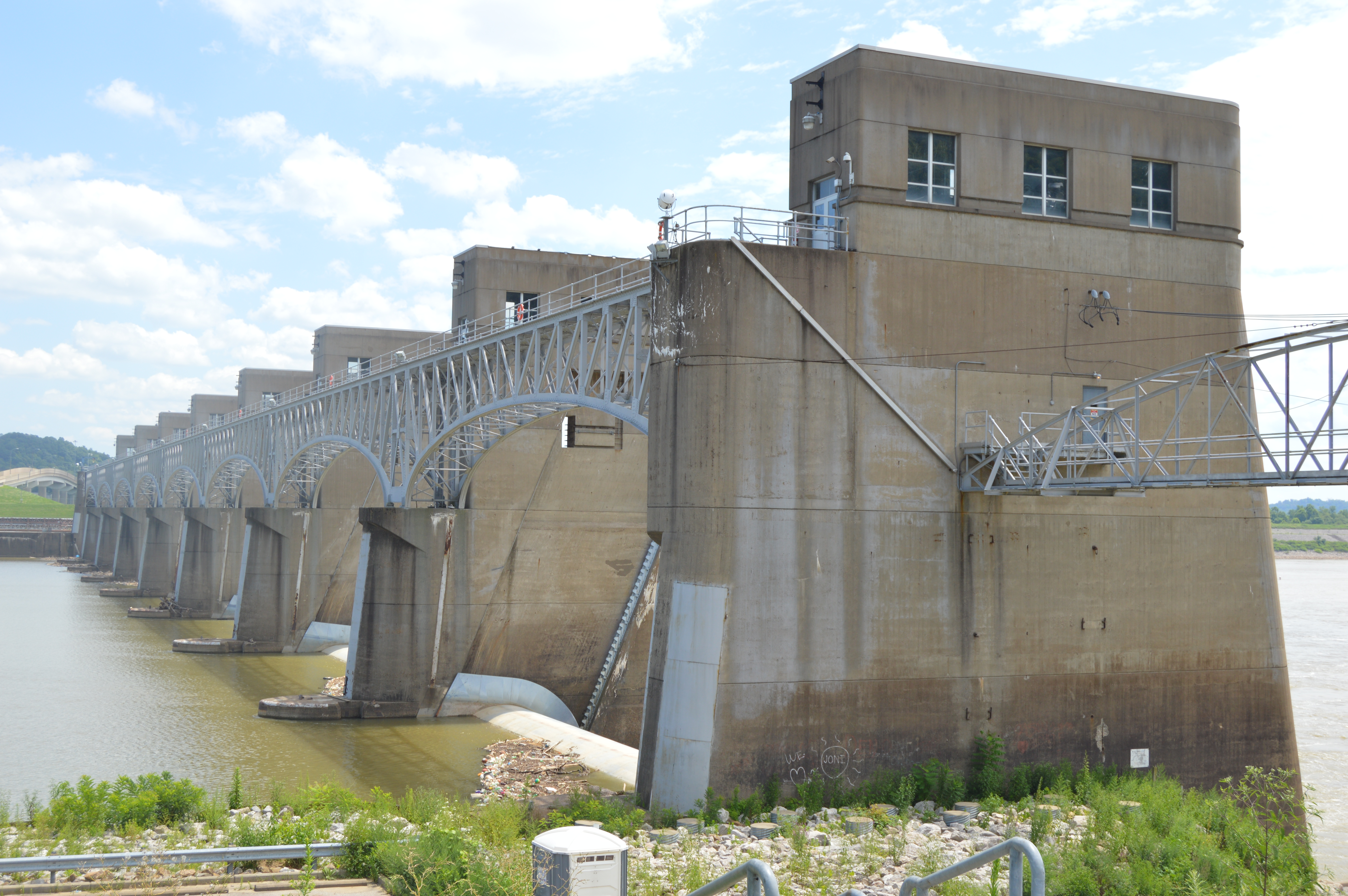
- Robert C. Byrd Locks and Dam on the Ohio River

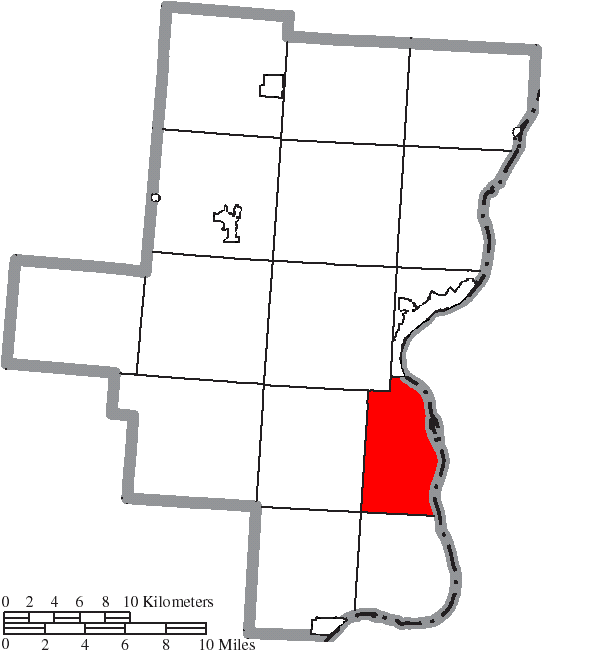
- Location of Clay Township in Gallia County
- Coordinates: 38°43′11″N 82°13′7″W
- Country: United States
- State: Ohio
- County: Gallia

Area
  - Total: 22.6 sq mi (58.6 km^{2})
  - Land: 21.9 sq mi (56.7 km^{2})
  - Water: 0.69 sq mi (1.8 km^{2})
- Elevation: 581 ft (177 m)

Population (2020)
  - Total: 1,710
  - Density: 78.1/sq mi (30.2/km^{2})
- Time zone: UTC-5 (Eastern (EST))
  - Summer (DST): UTC-4 (EDT)
- FIPS code: 39-15462
- GNIS feature ID: 1086134

Clay Township is one of the fifteen townships of Gallia County, Ohio, United States. As of the 2020 census the population was 1,710.

== Geography ==
Located in the southeastern part of the county along the Ohio River, it borders the following townships:

- Gallipolis Township - north
- Ohio Township - south
- Guyan Township - southwest corner
- Harrison Township - west
- Green Township - northwest

Mason County, West Virginia, lies across the Ohio River to the east.

It is located downstream of three of the county's five other Ohio River townships.

No municipalities are located in Clay Township.

== Name and history ==
It is one of nine Clay Townships statewide.

== Government ==
The township is governed by a three-member board of trustees, who are elected in November of odd-numbered years to a four-year term beginning on the following January 1. Two are elected in the year after the presidential election and one is elected in the year before it. There is also an elected township fiscal officer, who serves a four-year term beginning on April 1 of the year after the election, which is held in November of the year before the presidential election. Vacancies in the fiscal officership or on the board of trustees are filled by the remaining trustees.
