= Green Township, Gallia County, Ohio =

Township in Ohio, US

- Township
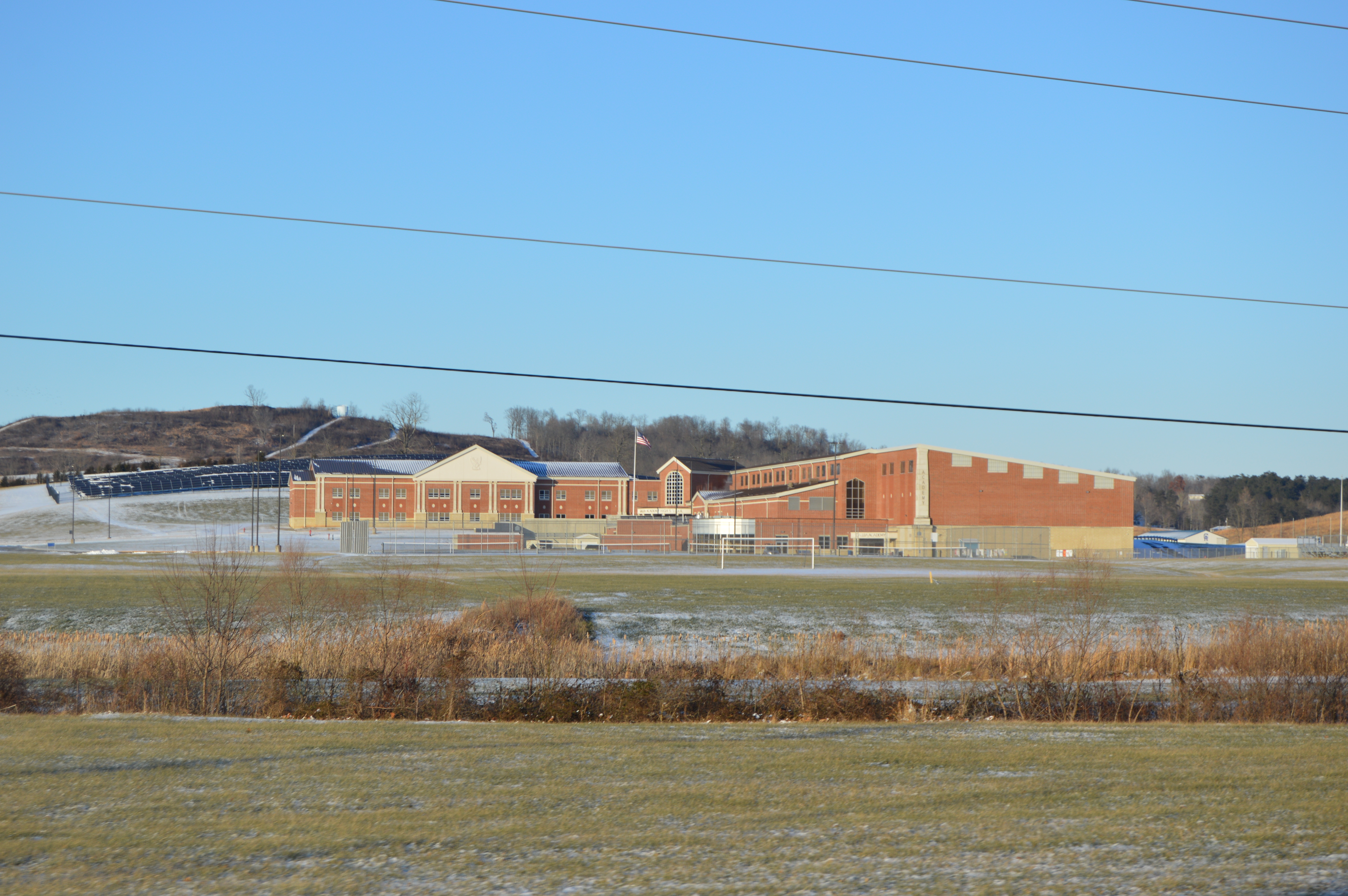
- Gallia Academy High School at Centenary

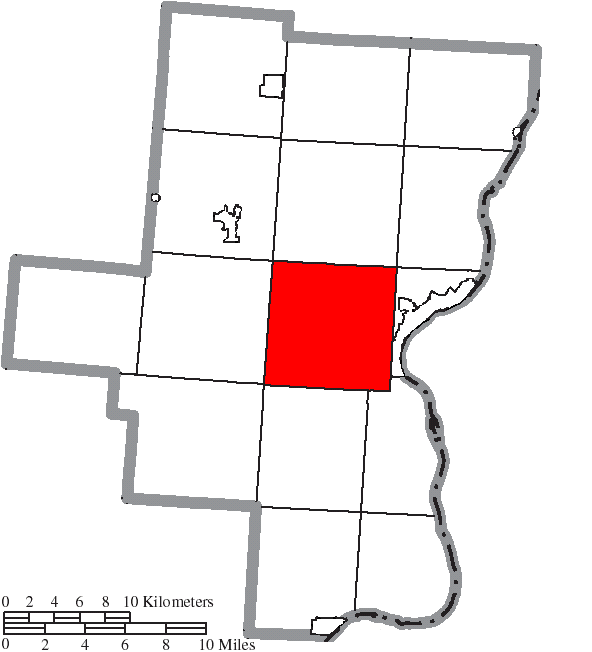
- Location of Green Township in Gallia County
- Coordinates: 38°48′33″N 82°16′1″W
- Country: United States
- State: Ohio
- County: Gallia

Area
  - Total: 38.2 sq mi (98.9 km^{2})
  - Land: 38.0 sq mi (98.3 km^{2})
  - Water: 0.27 sq mi (0.7 km^{2})
- Elevation: 830 ft (253 m)

Population (2020)
  - Total: 5,357
  - Density: 141/sq mi (54.5/km^{2})
- Time zone: UTC-5 (Eastern (EST))
  - Summer (DST): UTC-4 (EDT)
- FIPS code: 39-31738
- GNIS feature ID: 1086136

Green Township is one of the fifteen townships of Gallia County, Ohio, United States. As of the 2020 census the population was 5,357.

== Geography ==
Located at the center of the county, it borders the following townships:

- Springfield Township - north
- Addison Township - northeast corner
- Gallipolis Township - east
- Clay Township - southeast
- Harrison Township - south
- Walnut Township - southwest corner
- Perry Township - west
- Raccoon Township - northwest corner

Green Township is one of only two townships in the county without a border on another county.

No municipalities are located in Green Township, although the unincorporated community of Northup is located in the south part of the township, on Raccoon Creek.

== Name and history ==
It is one of sixteen Green Townships statewide.

== Government ==
The township is governed by a three-member board of trustees, who are elected in November of odd-numbered years to a four-year term beginning on the following January 1. Two are elected in the year after the presidential election and one is elected in the year before it. There is also an elected township fiscal officer, who serves a four-year term beginning on April 1 of the year after the election, which is held in November of the year before the presidential election. Vacancies in the fiscal officership or on the board of trustees are filled by the remaining trustees.
