= Walnut Township, Gallia County, Ohio =

Township in Ohio, US

- Township
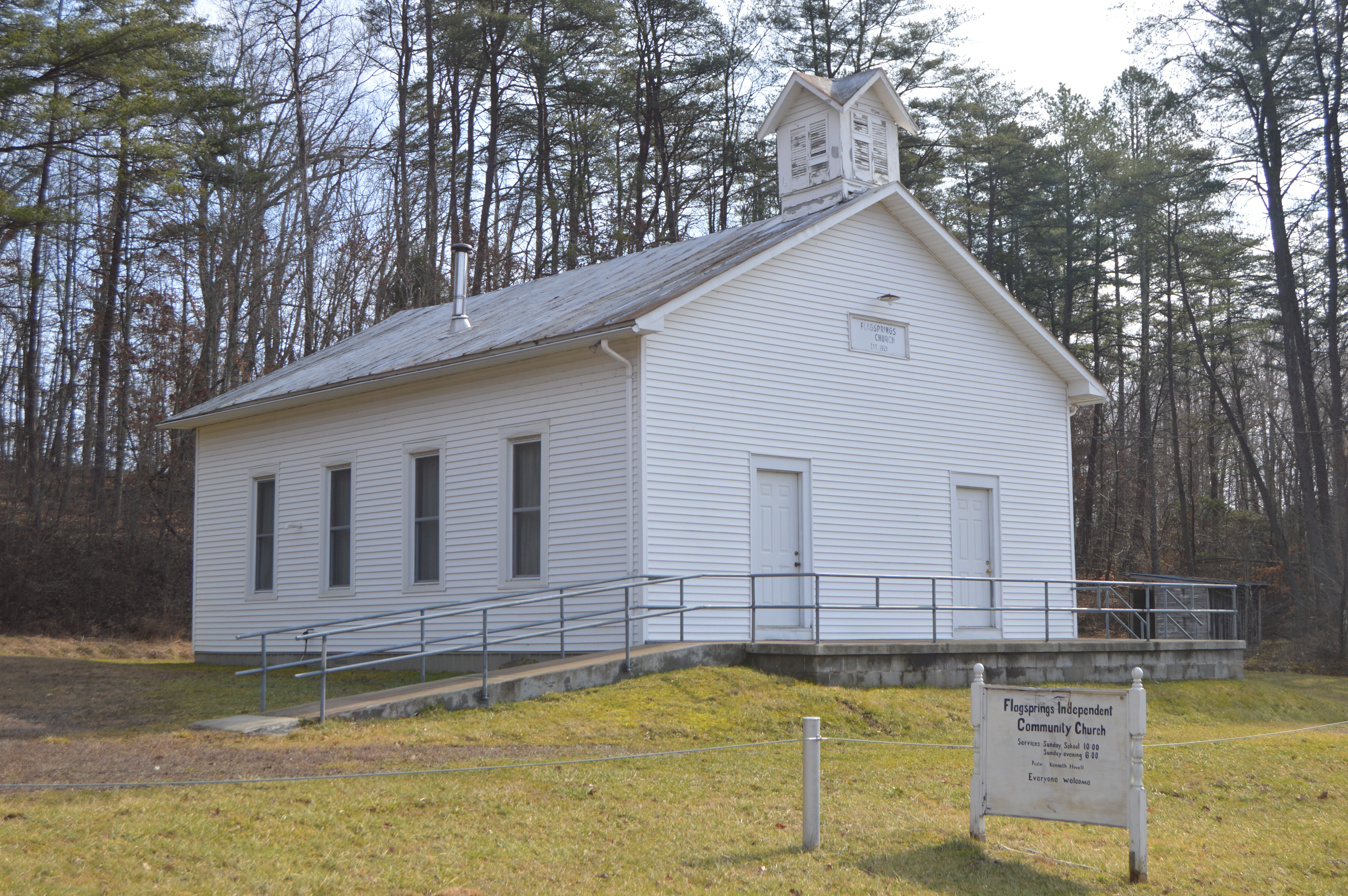
- Flagsprings Independent Community Church

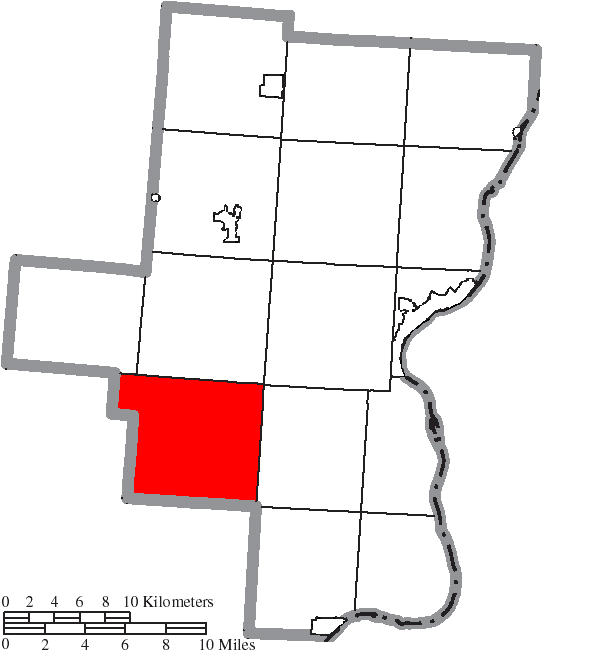
- Location of Walnut Township in Gallia County
- Coordinates: 38°43′10″N 82°24′45″W
- Country: United States
- State: Ohio
- County: Gallia

Area
  - Total: 41.0 sq mi (106.3 km^{2})
  - Land: 40.9 sq mi (105.9 km^{2})
  - Water: 0.12 sq mi (0.3 km^{2})
- Elevation: 890 ft (270 m)

Population (2020)
  - Total: 1,021
  - Density: 24.97/sq mi (9.641/km^{2})
- Time zone: UTC-5 (Eastern (EST))
  - Summer (DST): UTC-4 (EDT)
- FIPS code: 39-80584
- GNIS feature ID: 1086146

Historical population
Census	Pop.	Note	%±
1990	835		—
2000	924		10.7%
2010	960		3.9%
2020	1,021		6.4%
U.S. Census:

Walnut Township is one of the fifteen townships of Gallia County, Ohio, United States. As of the 2020 census the population was 1,021.

== Geography ==
Located in the southwestern part of the county, it borders the following townships:

- Perry Township - north
- Green Township - northeast corner
- Harrison Township - east
- Guyan Township - southeast corner
- Mason Township, Lawrence County - south
- Aid Township, Lawrence County - southwest corner
- Symmes Township, Lawrence County - west
- Greenfield Township - northwest

No municipalities are located in Walnut Township.

== Name and history ==
Statewide, other Walnut Townships are located in Fairfield and Pickaway counties, plus a Walnut Creek Township in Holmes County.

Walnut Township was organized in 1819. It was named for the walnut trees prevalent in the area.

== Government ==
The township is governed by a three-member board of trustees, who are elected in November of odd-numbered years to a four-year term beginning on the following January 1. Two are elected in the year after the presidential election and one is elected in the year before it. There is also an elected township fiscal officer, who serves a four-year term beginning on April 1 of the year after the election, which is held in November of the year before the presidential election. Vacancies in the fiscal officership or on the board of trustees are filled by the remaining trustees.
