= Northup, Ohio =

Unincorporated community in Ohio, U.S.

Coordinates: 38°46′55″N 82°17′02″W

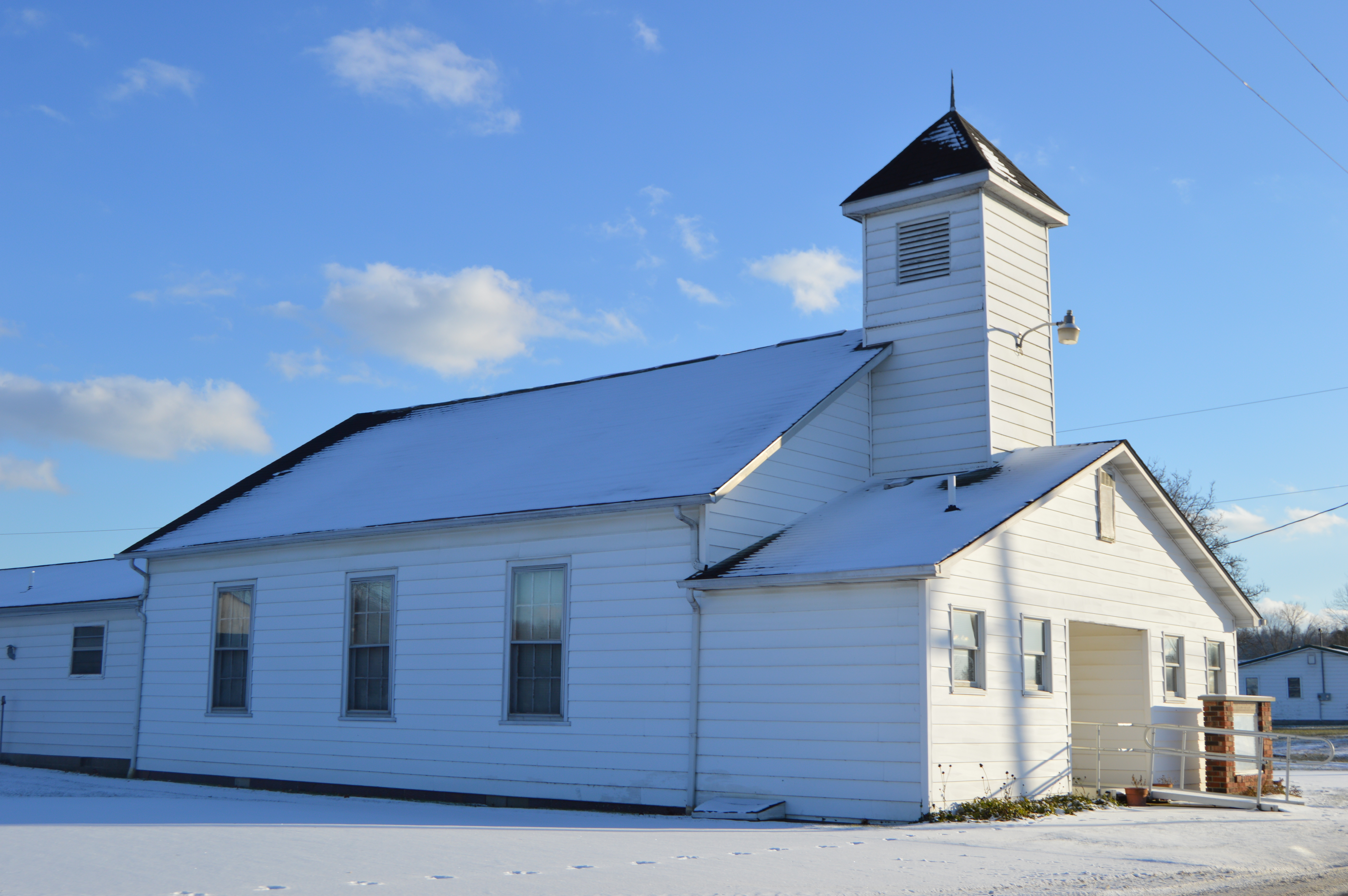
Baptist church

Northup is an unincorporated community in Green Township, Gallia County, in the U.S. state of Ohio. The hamlet is located in the south part of the township, on Raccoon Creek.

== History ==
A post office called Northup was established in the village in 1858. The community was named after its founder, John Syler Northup (9 May 1810 – 5 August 1887).
