= Spring Creek Township, Pike County, Illinois =

Coordinates: 39°26′36″N 90°44′43″W

Spring Creek Township
- Township
- Location in Pike County

- Pike County's location in Illinois
- Country: United States
- State: Illinois
- County: Pike
- Established: November 8, 1853

Area
  - Total: 37.41 sq mi (96.9 km^{2})
  - Land: 37.4 sq mi (97 km^{2})
  - Water: 0.01 sq mi (0.026 km^{2}) 0.03%

Population (2010)
  - Estimate (2016): 575
  - Density: 15.8/sq mi (6.1/km^{2})
- Time zone: UTC-6 (CST)
  - Summer (DST): UTC-5 (CDT)
- FIPS code: 17-149-71617

Spring Creek Township is located in Pike County, Illinois. As of the 2010 census, its population was 591 and it contained 295 housing units.

The village of Nebo, Illinois is on the west side of the township, at the intersection of County Highway 7 and County Highway 10, also called Vin Fiz Road.

== Geography ==
According to the 2010 census, the township has a total area of 37.41 square miles (96.9 km^{2}), of which 37.4 square miles (97 km^{2}) (or 99.97%) is land and 0.01 square miles (0.026 km^{2}) (or 0.03%) is water.

== Demographics ==
Historical population
Census	Pop.	Note	%±
2016 (est.)	575
U.S. Decennial Census
