= Patriot, Ohio =

Unincorporated community in Ohio, U.S.

Coordinates: 38°46′28″N 82°23′02″W

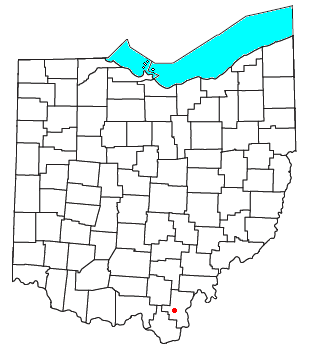
Location of Patriot, Ohio

Patriot is an unincorporated community in southern Perry Township, Gallia County, Ohio, United States. It has a post office with the ZIP code 45658.

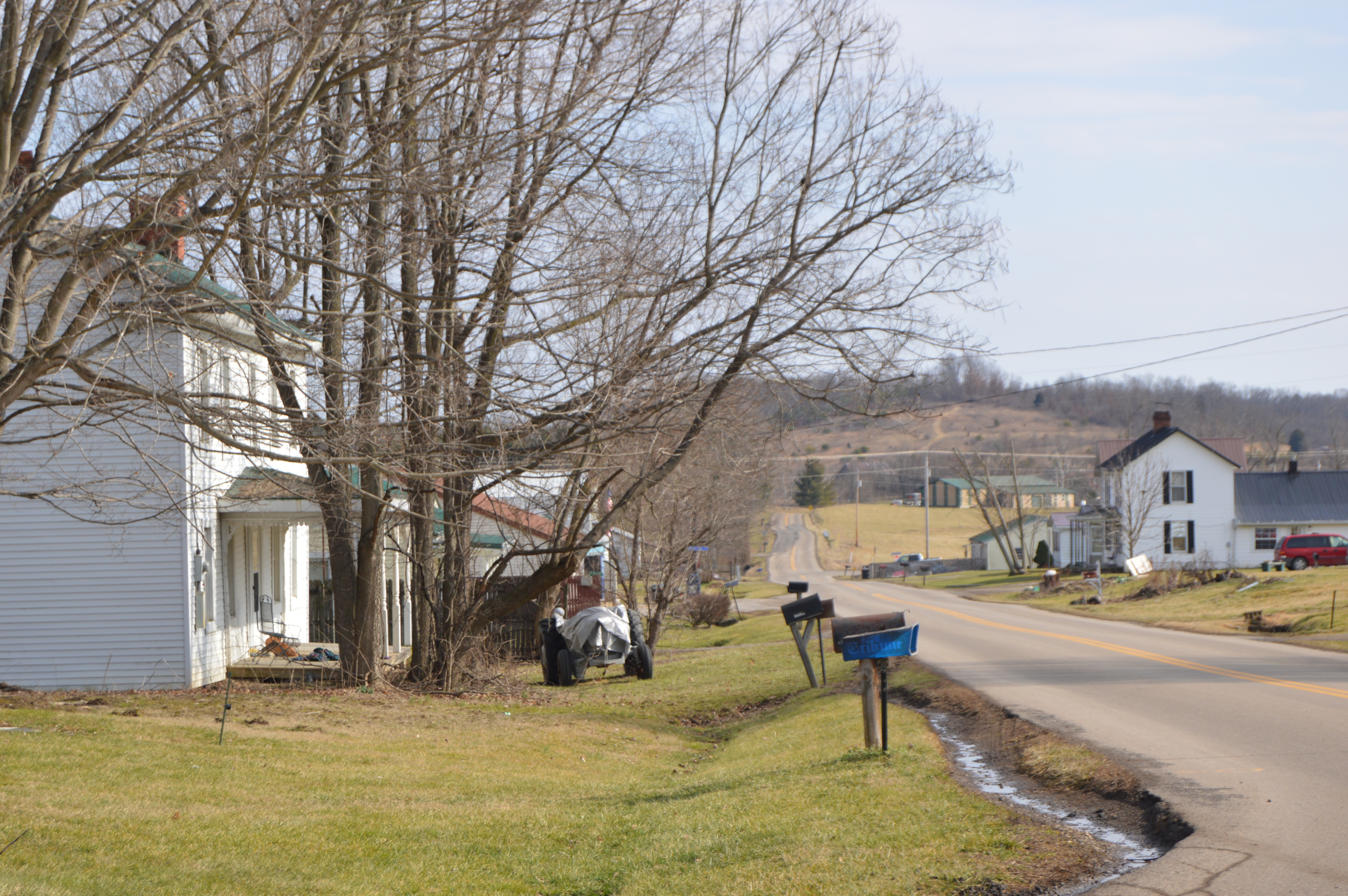
Patriot Road, looking east from Gage Road

Patriot is part of the Point Pleasant, WV–OH Micropolitan Statistical Area. Public education in the community of Patriot is provided by the Gallia County Local School District.

Patriot was laid out in 1828. A post office called Patriot has been in operation since 1839. William J. Thornton (1878–1951), Illinois state representative and businessman, was born in Patriot.
