= Springfield Township, Gallia County, Ohio =

Township in Ohio, US

- Township
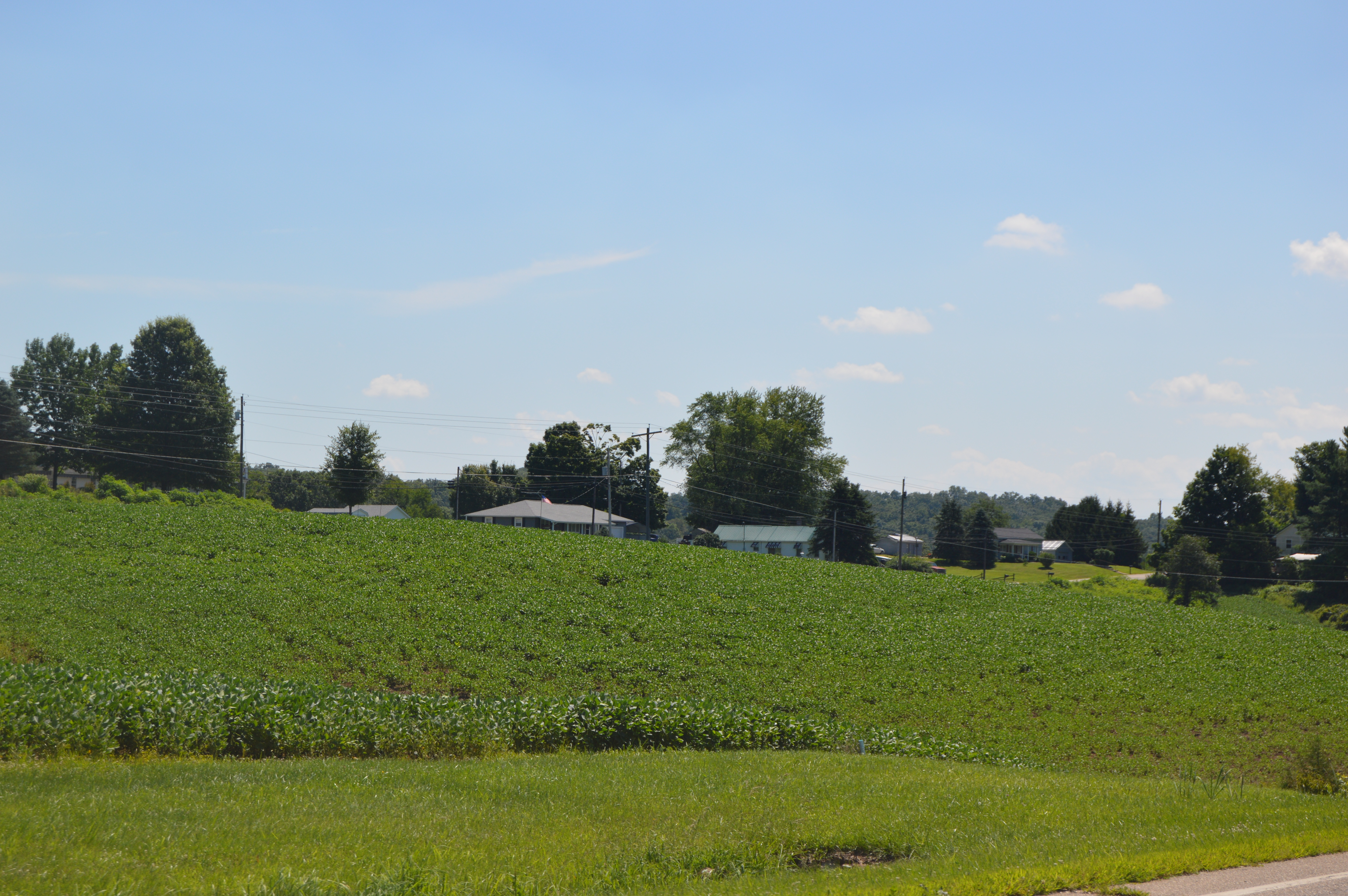
- Along State Route 160 northwest of Kerr

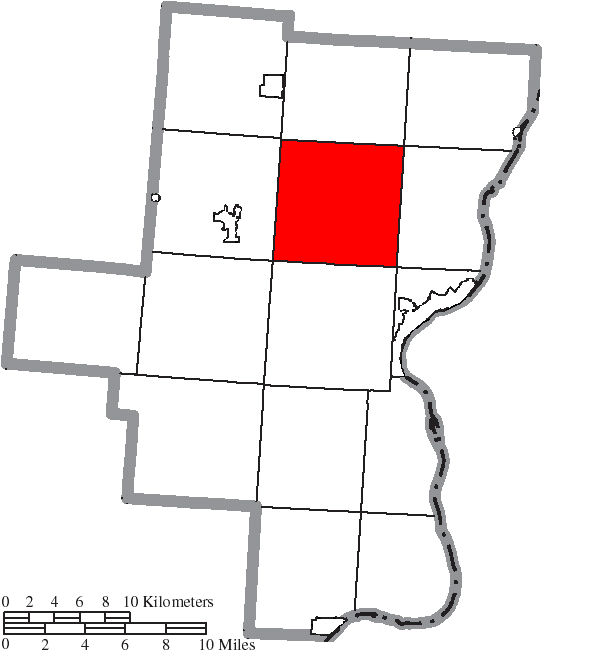
- Location of Springfield Township in Gallia County
- Coordinates: 38°53′52″N 82°16′43″W
- Country: United States
- State: Ohio
- County: Gallia

Area
  - Total: 36.9 sq mi (95.5 km^{2})
  - Land: 36.7 sq mi (95.1 km^{2})
  - Water: 0.15 sq mi (0.4 km^{2})
- Elevation: 692 ft (211 m)

Population (2020)
  - Total: 3,413
  - Density: 93.0/sq mi (35.9/km^{2})
- Time zone: UTC-5 (Eastern (EST))
  - Summer (DST): UTC-4 (EDT)
- FIPS code: 39-74120
- GNIS feature ID: 1086145

Springfield Township is one of the fifteen townships of Gallia County, Ohio, United States. As of the 2020 census the population was 3,413.

== Geography ==
Located in the northern part of the county, it borders the following townships:

- Morgan Township - north
- Cheshire Township - northeast corner
- Addison Township - east
- Gallipolis Township - southeast corner
- Green Township - south
- Perry Township - southwest corner
- Raccoon Township - west
- Huntington Township - northwest corner

Springfield Township is one of only two county townships without a border on another county.

No municipalities are located in Springfield Township, although the unincorporated communities of Bidwell and Kerr are located near the center of the township.

== Name and history ==
It is one of eleven Springfield Townships statewide.

== Government ==
The township is governed by a three-member board of trustees, who are elected in November of odd-numbered years to a four-year term beginning on the following January 1. Two are elected in the year after the presidential election and one is elected in the year before it. There is also an elected township fiscal officer, who serves a four-year term beginning on April 1 of the year after the election, which is held in November of the year before the presidential election. Vacancies in the fiscal officership or on the board of trustees are filled by the remaining trustees.
