= Guyan Township, Gallia County, Ohio =

Township in Ohio, US

- Township
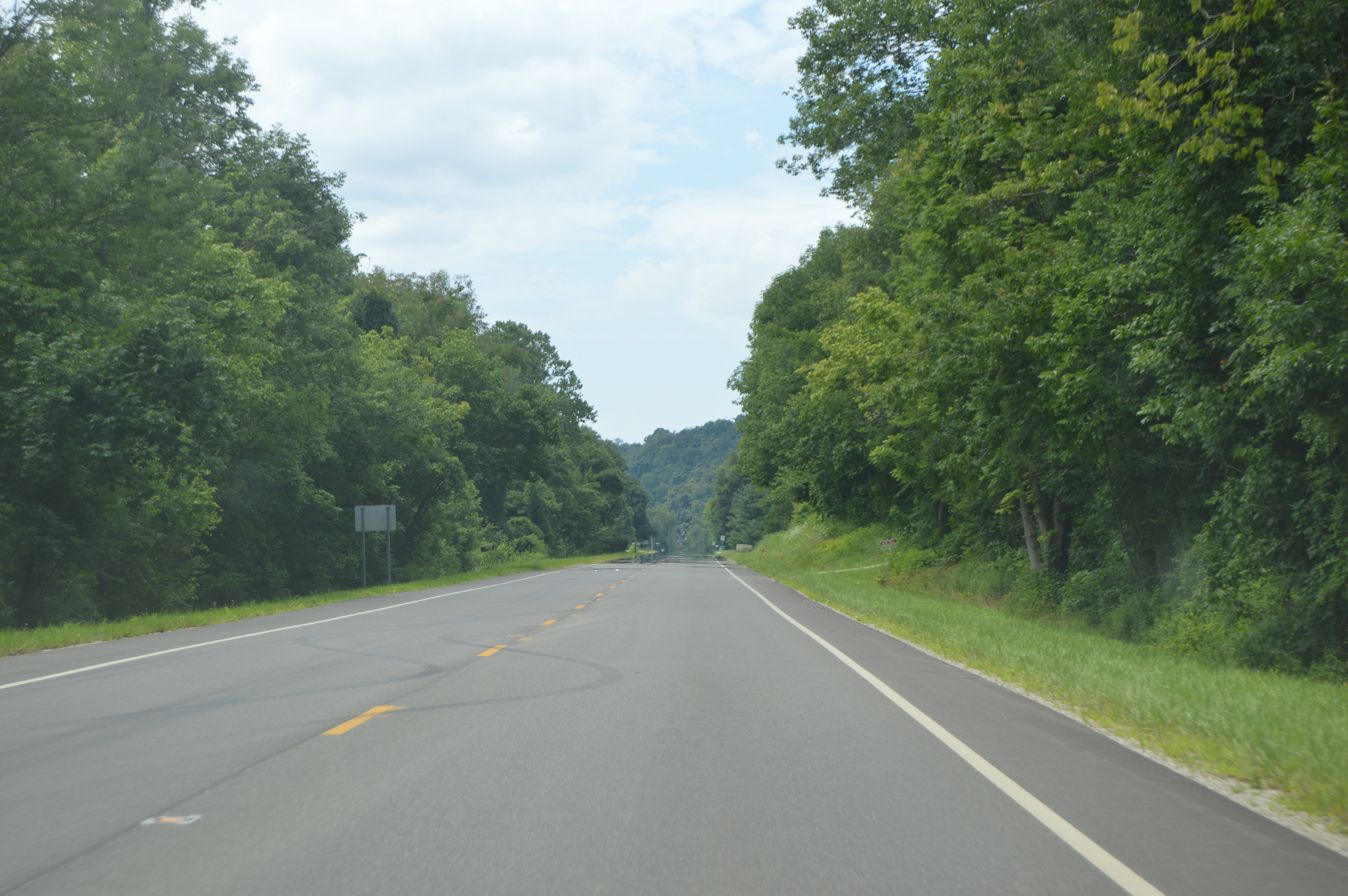
- State Route 7 just east of Crown City

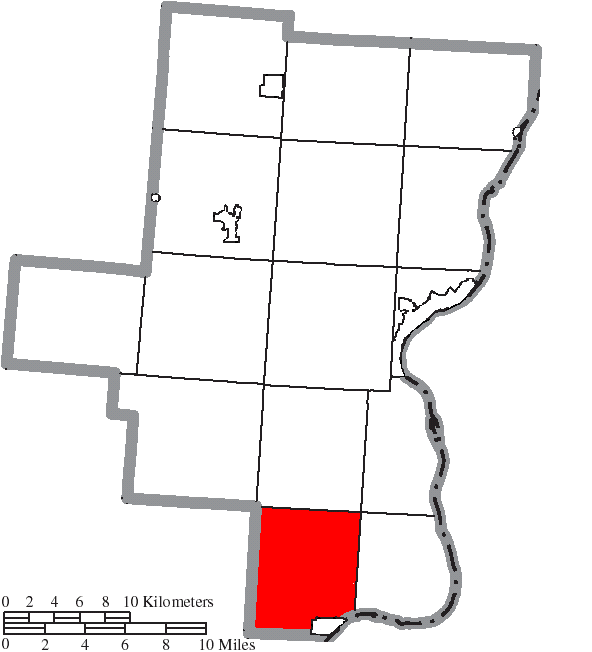
- Location of Guyan Township in Gallia County
- Coordinates: 38°37′20″N 82°17′53″W
- Country: United States
- State: Ohio
- County: Gallia

Area
  - Total: 31.6 sq mi (81.9 km^{2})
  - Land: 31.5 sq mi (81.7 km^{2})
  - Water: 0.077 sq mi (0.2 km^{2})
- Elevation: 702 ft (214 m)

Population (2020)
  - Total: 1,129
  - Density: 35.8/sq mi (13.8/km^{2})
- Time zone: UTC-5 (Eastern (EST))
  - Summer (DST): UTC-4 (EDT)
- FIPS code: 39-32760
- GNIS feature ID: 1086138

Guyan Township is one of the fifteen townships of Gallia County, Ohio, United States. As of the 2020 census the population was 1,129.

== Geography ==
Located in the southern part of the county along the Ohio River, it borders the following townships:

- Harrison Township - north
- Clay Township - northeast corner
- Ohio Township - east
- Rome Township, Lawrence County - south
- Windsor Township, Lawrence County - southwest corner
- Mason Township, Lawrence County - west
- Walnut Township - northwest corner

Cabell County, West Virginia lies across the Ohio River to the southeast.

The farthest downstream Ohio River township in the county, it is also the most southerly township in the county.

The village of Crown City is located in southern Guyan Township. It is the third smallest village in Gallia County.

== Name and history ==
It is the only Guyan Township statewide.

Guyan Township was named after the creek that runs through it.

== Government ==
The township is governed by a three-member board of trustees, who are elected in November of odd-numbered years to a four-year term beginning on the following January 1. Two are elected in the year after the presidential election and one is elected in the year before it. There is also an elected township fiscal officer, who serves a four-year term beginning on April 1 of the year after the election, which is held in November of the year before the presidential election. Vacancies in the fiscal officership or on the board of trustees are filled by the remaining trustees.

- Grandma Gatewood, first solo female thru-hiker of the Appalachian Trail and first person to hike it three times.
- Nancy Zimpher, chancellor of the State University of New York system
