= Perry Township, Gallia County, Ohio =

Township in Ohio, US

- Township
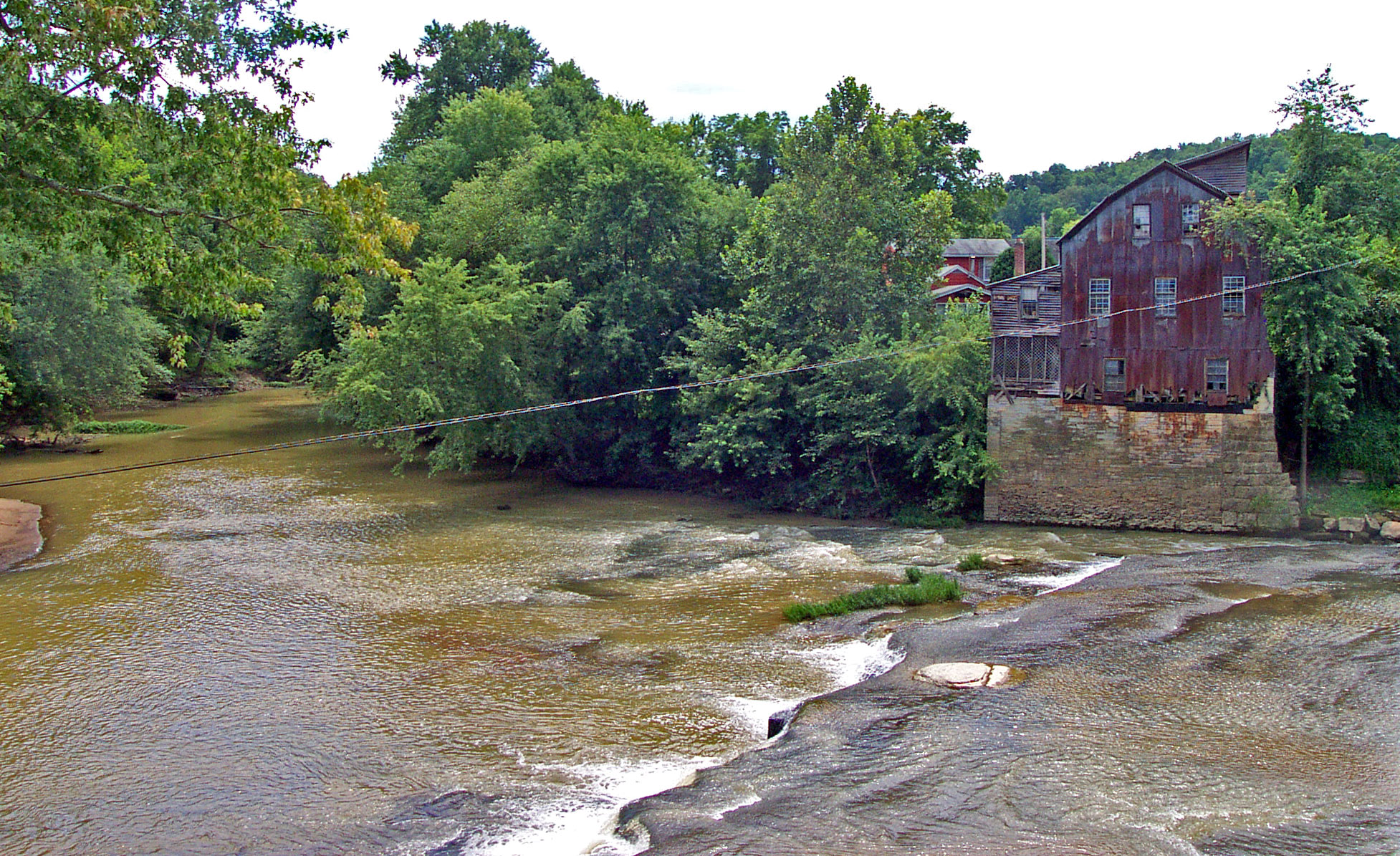
- Davis Mill, a township landmark

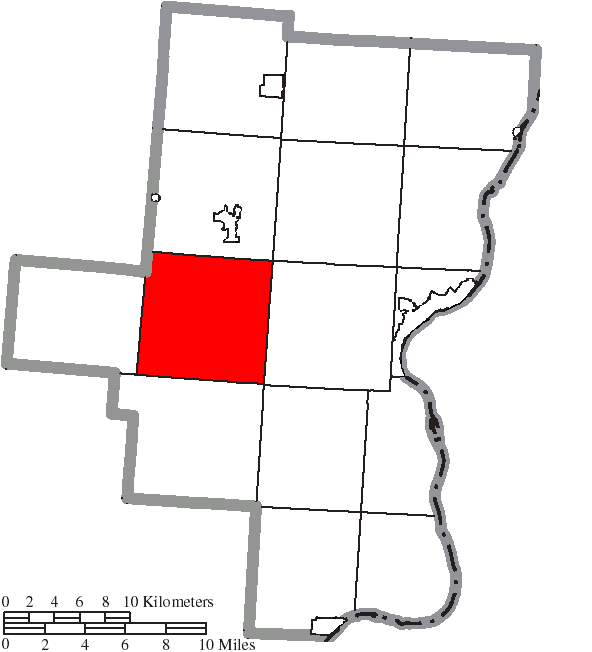
- Location of Perry Township in Gallia County
- Coordinates: 38°48′44″N 82°23′6″W
- Country: United States
- State: Ohio
- County: Gallia

Area
  - Total: 38.4 sq mi (99.4 km^{2})
  - Land: 38.1 sq mi (98.7 km^{2})
  - Water: 0.27 sq mi (0.7 km^{2})
- Elevation: 617 ft (188 m)

Population (2020)
  - Total: 1,524
  - Density: 40.0/sq mi (15.4/km^{2})
- Time zone: UTC-5 (Eastern (EST))
  - Summer (DST): UTC-4 (EDT)
- FIPS code: 39-61854
- GNIS feature ID: 1086143

Perry Township is one of the fifteen townships of Gallia County, Ohio, United States. As of the 2020 census the population was 1,524.

== Geography ==
Located in the western part of the county, it borders the following townships:

- Raccoon Township - north
- Springfield Township - northeast corner
- Green Township - east
- Harrison Township - southeast corner
- Walnut Township - south
- Greenfield Township - west
- Madison Township, Jackson County - northwest

No municipalities are located in Perry Township, although the unincorporated community of Patriot is located in the township's southeast.

== Name and history ==
It is one of twenty-six Perry Townships statewide.

Perry Township was established in 1816. In 1833, Perry Township contained three gristmills and three saw mills.

== Government ==
The township is governed by a three-member board of trustees, who are elected in November of odd-numbered years to a four-year term beginning on the following January 1. Two are elected in the year after the presidential election and one is elected in the year before it. There is also an elected township fiscal officer, who serves a four-year term beginning on April 1 of the year after the election, which is held in November of the year before the presidential election. Vacancies in the fiscal officership or on the board of trustees are filled by the remaining trustees.
