= Greenfield Township, Gallia County, Ohio =

Township in Ohio, US

- Township
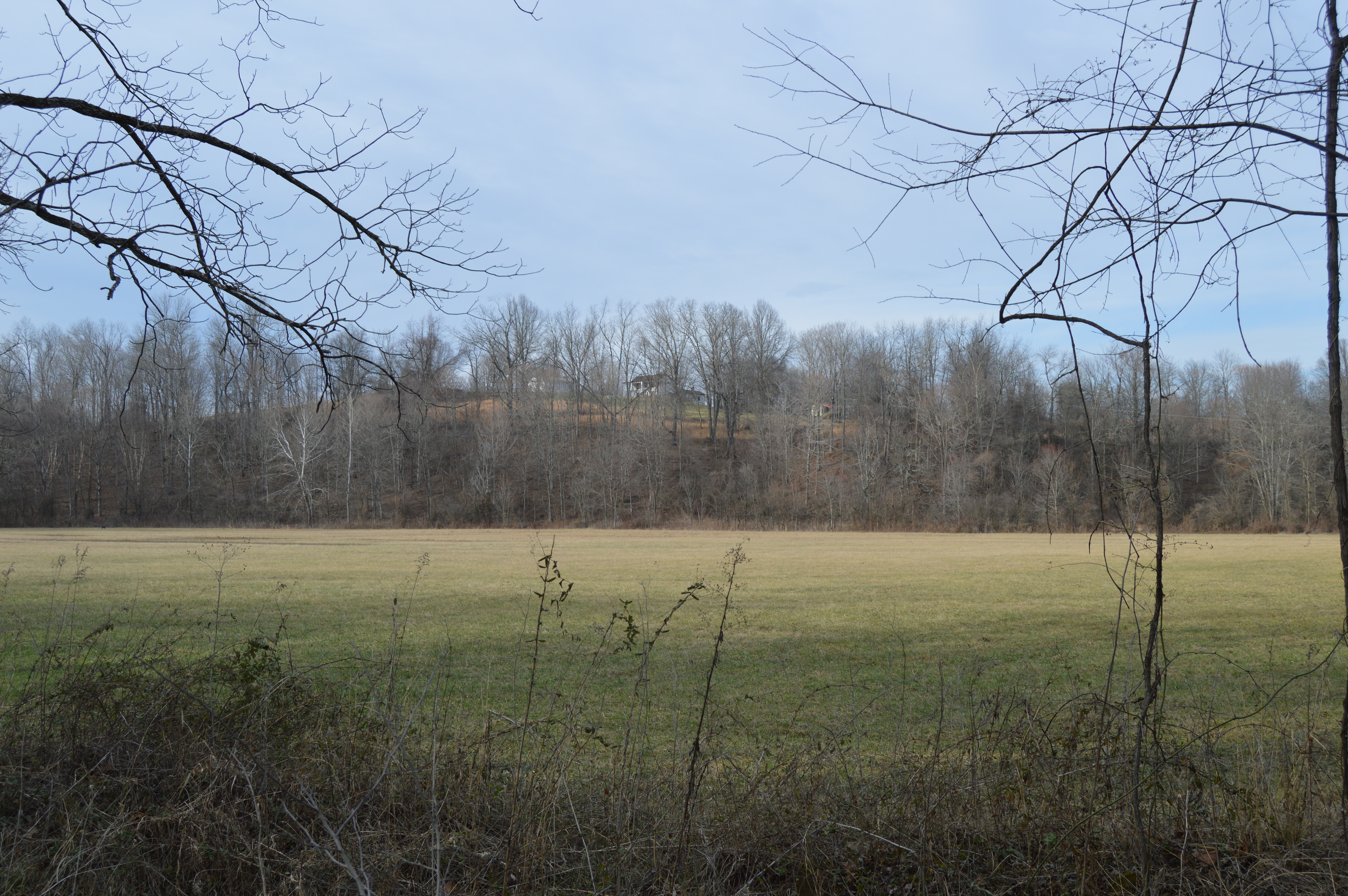
- Fields along Cambria Furnace Road, near the Jackson County boundary

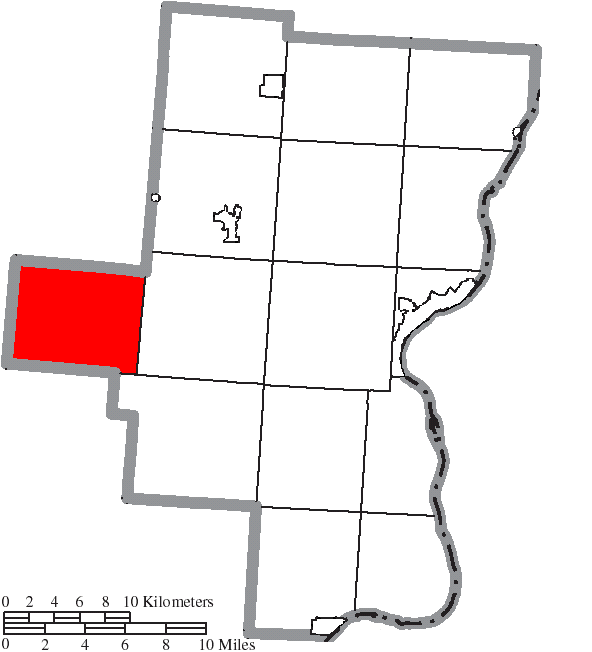
- Location of Greenfield Township in Gallia County
- Coordinates: 38°49′11″N 82°31′5″W
- Country: United States
- State: Ohio
- County: Gallia

Area
  - Total: 33.2 sq mi (86.1 km^{2})
  - Land: 33.2 sq mi (86.0 km^{2})
  - Water: 0.077 sq mi (0.2 km^{2})
- Elevation: 728 ft (222 m)

Population (2020)
  - Total: 503
  - Density: 15.1/sq mi (5.85/km^{2})
- Time zone: UTC-5 (Eastern (EST))
  - Summer (DST): UTC-4 (EDT)
- FIPS code: 39-32074
- GNIS feature ID: 1086137

Historical population
Census	Pop.	Note	%±
1990	437		—
2000	498		14.0%
2010	495		−0.6%
2020	503		1.6%
U.S. Census:

Greenfield Township is one of the fifteen townships of Gallia County, Ohio, United States. As of the 2020 census the population was 503.

== Geography ==
Located in the far western part of the county, it borders the following townships:

- Madison Township, Jackson County - north
- Perry Township - east
- Walnut Township - southeast
- Symmes Township, Lawrence County - south
- Washington Township, Lawrence County - west
- Jefferson Township, Jackson County - northwest

It is the most westerly township in the county.

No municipalities are located in Greenfield Township.

== Name and history ==
Statewide, other Greenfield Townships are located in Fairfield and Huron Counties.

== Government ==
The township is governed by a three-member board of trustees, who are elected in November of odd-numbered years to a four-year term beginning on the following January 1. Two are elected in the year after the presidential election and one is elected in the year before it. There is also an elected township fiscal officer, who serves a four-year term beginning on April 1 of the year after the election, which is held in November of the year before the presidential election. Vacancies in the fiscal officership or on the board of trustees are filled by the remaining trustees.
