= Raccoon Township, Gallia County, Ohio =

Township in Ohio, US

- Township
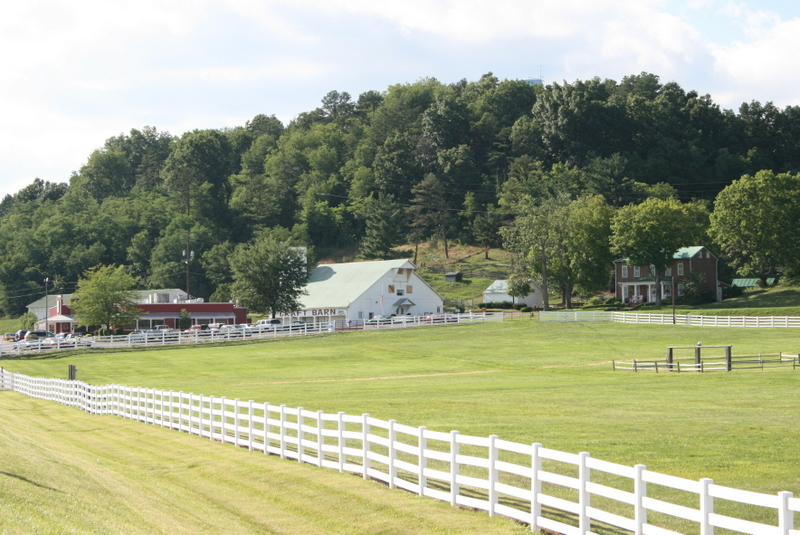
- Wood Old Homestead, the Bob Evans Farm

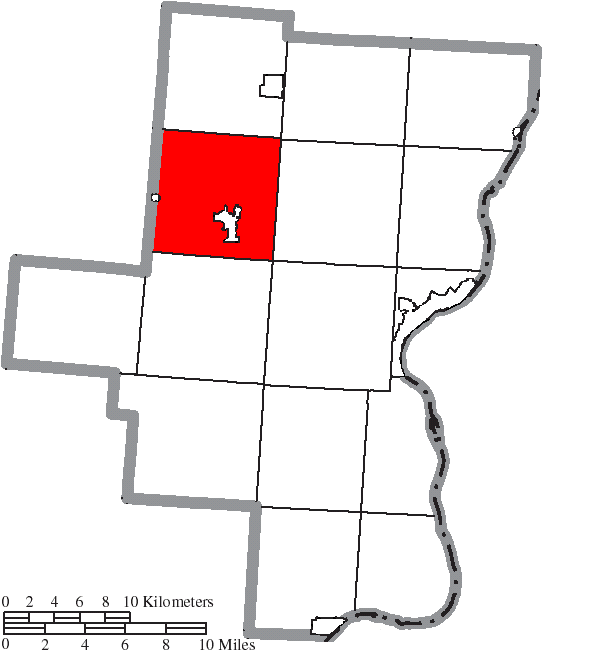
- Location of Raccoon Township in Gallia County
- Coordinates: 38°53′50″N 82°23′7″W
- Country: United States
- State: Ohio
- County: Gallia

Area
  - Total: 37.6 sq mi (97.5 km^{2})
  - Land: 37.1 sq mi (96.0 km^{2})
  - Water: 0.58 sq mi (1.5 km^{2})
- Elevation: 669 ft (204 m)

Population (2020)
  - Total: 2,102
  - Density: 56.7/sq mi (21.9/km^{2})
- Time zone: UTC-5 (Eastern (EST))
  - Summer (DST): UTC-4 (EDT)
- FIPS code: 39-65228
- GNIS feature ID: 1086144

Raccoon Township is one of the fifteen townships of Gallia County, Ohio, United States. As of the 2020 census the population was 2,102.

== Geography ==
Located in the northwestern part of the county, it borders the following townships:

- Huntington Township - north
- Morgan Township - northeast corner
- Springfield Township - east
- Green Township - southeast corner
- Perry Township - south
- Madison Township, Jackson County - west
- Bloomfield Township, Jackson County - northwest corner

Raccoon Creek forms its eastern border.

Two villages are located in Raccoon Township: Centerville, the smallest village in the county, in the west; and Rio Grande, the second largest village in the county, in the south.

== Name and history ==
It is the only Raccoon Township statewide.

Raccoon Township was organized in 1806. In 1833, the township contained four gristmills, four saw mills, two carding machines, a fulling mill, and two distilleries.

== Government ==
The township is governed by a three-member board of trustees, who are elected in November of odd-numbered years to a four-year term beginning on the following January 1. Two are elected in the year after the presidential election and one is elected in the year before it. There is also an elected township fiscal officer, who serves a four-year term beginning on April 1 of the year after the election, which is held in November of the year before the presidential election. Vacancies in the fiscal officership or on the board of trustees are filled by the remaining trustees.
