= Ohio Township, Gallia County, Ohio =

Township in Ohio, US

- Township
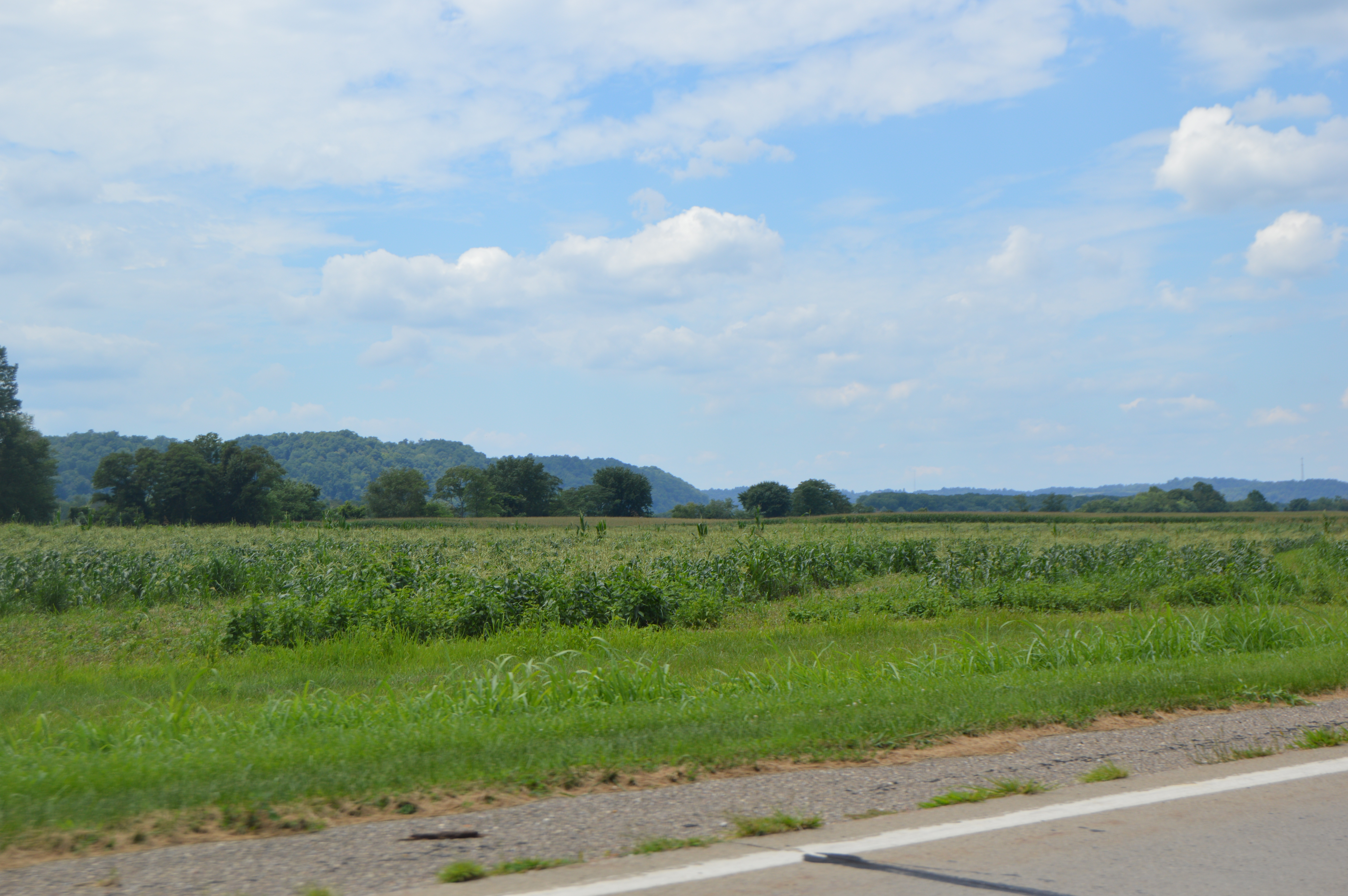
- Fields along State Route 7

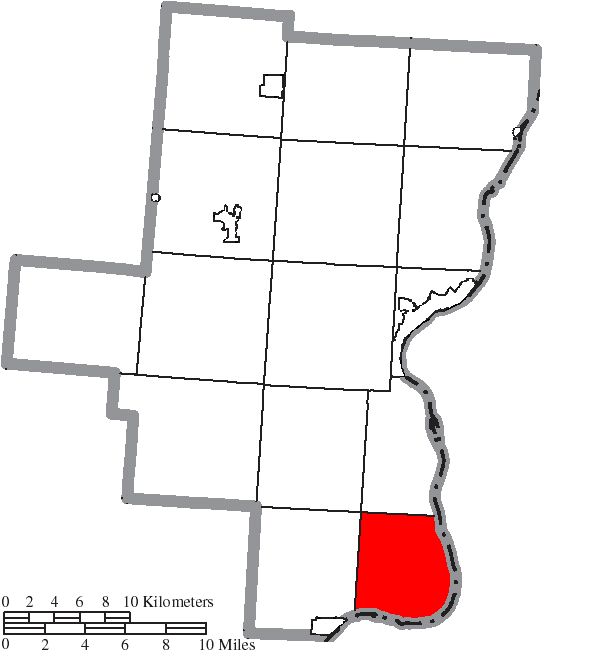
- Location of Ohio Township in Gallia County
- Coordinates: 38°37′52″N 82°12′44″W
- Country: United States
- State: Ohio
- County: Gallia

Area
  - Total: 23.6 sq mi (61.2 km^{2})
  - Land: 23.3 sq mi (60.4 km^{2})
  - Water: 0.31 sq mi (0.8 km^{2})
- Elevation: 768 ft (234 m)

Population (2020)
  - Total: 947
  - Density: 40.6/sq mi (15.7/km^{2})
- Time zone: UTC-5 (Eastern (EST))
  - Summer (DST): UTC-4 (EDT)
- FIPS code: 39-57974
- GNIS feature ID: 1086142

Ohio Township is one of the fifteen townships of Gallia County, Ohio, United States. As of the 2020 census the population was 947.

== Geography ==
Located in the southeastern corner of the county along the Ohio River, it borders the following townships:

- Clay Township - north
- Guyan Township - west
- Harrison Township - northwest corner

West Virginia lies across the Ohio River to the east and south: Mason County to the east, and Cabell County to the south. It lies downstream of four of the other five Ohio River townships.

No municipalities are located in Ohio Township.

== Name and history ==
Ohio Township was organized in 1804. It was named after the Ohio River, which forms its eastern and southern borders. Statewide, other Ohio Townships are located in Clermont and Monroe counties.

== Government ==
The township is governed by a three-member board of trustees, who are elected in November of odd-numbered years to a four-year term beginning on the following January 1. Two are elected in the year after the presidential election and one is elected in the year before it. There is also an elected township fiscal officer, who serves a four-year term beginning on April 1 of the year after the election, which is held in November of the year before the presidential election. Vacancies in the fiscal officership or on the board of trustees are filled by the remaining trustees.
