= Gallia County, Ohio =

County in Ohio, United States

- County
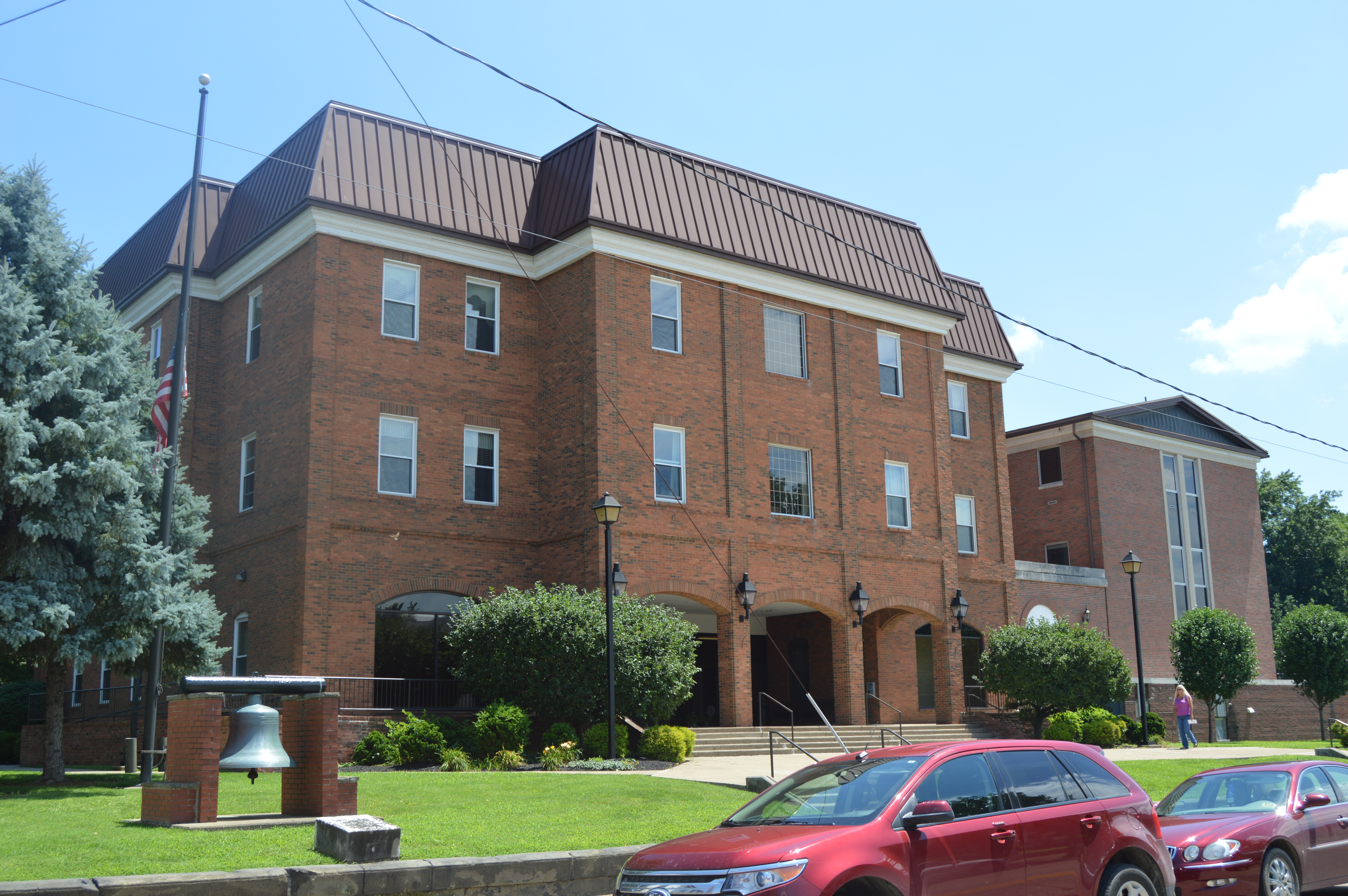
- Courthouse in Gallipolis

- Flag Seal

- Location within the U.S. state of Ohio
- Coordinates: 38°50′N 82°19′W
- Country: United States
- State: Ohio
- Founded: March 25, 1803
- Named for: the Latin name for France
- Seat: Gallipolis
- Largest village: Gallipolis

Area
  - Total: 471 sq mi (1,220 km^{2})
  - Land: 467 sq mi (1,210 km^{2})
  - Water: 4.7 sq mi (12 km^{2}) 1.0%

Population (2020)
  - Total: 29,220
  - Estimate (2025): 29,072 ▼
  - Density: 62/sq mi (24/km^{2})
- Time zone: UTC−5 (Eastern)
  - Summer (DST): UTC−4 (EDT)
- Congressional district: 2nd
- Website: www.gallianet.net

Gallia County (/ˈɡæliə/) is a county located in the U.S. state of Ohio. As of the 2020 census, the population was 29,220. Its county seat and largest village is Gallipolis.

Named after the French people who originally settled there, its name "Gallia" is the Latin word for Gaul, the ancient region of Western Europe that included present day France. Gallia County is part of the Point Pleasant, WV–OH Micropolitan Statistical Area.

== History ==
Gallia County was formed on March 25, 1803, from portions of Adams and Washington counties. Gallia County had originally been settled by French immigrants, who named the county "Gallia", the Latin name for Gaul, the ancient region of Western Europe which included present day France.

In the 19th century, the county was settled by numerous migrants from the Upper South, who traveled to the territory by the Ohio River. In the antebellum years, some of its towns became centers of settlement by African Americans, both free blacks (some also from the South) and refugee slaves who had escaped their owners and come across the river to a free state. There were some whites and Native Americans in the Blackfork settlement as well.

In 1818, a group from Wales settled in Gallia County, with Welsh remaining Gallia County's most common second language until 1970.

== Geography ==
According to the U.S. Census Bureau, the county has a total area of 471 square miles (1,220 km^{2}), of which 467 square miles (1,210 km^{2}) is land and 4.7 square miles (12 km^{2}) (1.0%) is water.

=== Adjacent counties ===
- Vinton County (north)
- Meigs County (northeast)
- Mason County, West Virginia (east)
- Cabell County, West Virginia (south)
- Lawrence County (southwest)
- Jackson County (northwest)

=== National protected area ===
- Wayne National Forest (part)

== Demographics ==
Historical population
Census	Pop.	Note	%±
1810	4,181		—
1820	7,098		69.8%
1830	9,733		37.1%
1840	13,444		38.1%
1850	17,063		26.9%
1860	22,043		29.2%
1870	25,545		15.9%
1880	28,124		10.1%
1890	27,005		−4.0%
1900	27,918		3.4%
1910	25,745		−7.8%
1920	23,311		−9.5%
1930	23,050		−1.1%
1940	24,930		8.2%
1950	24,910		−0.1%
1960	26,120		4.9%
1970	25,239		−3.4%
1980	30,098		19.3%
1990	30,954		2.8%
2000	31,069		0.4%
2010	30,934		−0.4%
2020	29,220		−5.5%
2025 (est.)	29,072	▼	−0.5%
U.S. Decennial Census; 1790–1960 1900–1990; 1990–2000 2020 2025

=== 2020 census ===
As of the 2020 census, the county had a population of 29,220. The median age was 41.5 years. 23.2% of residents were under the age of 18 and 19.6% of residents were 65 years of age or older. For every 100 females there were 97.3 males, and for every 100 females age 18 and over there were 94.9 males age 18 and over.

The racial makeup of the county was 92.6% White, 2.1% Black or African American, 0.2% American Indian and Alaska Native, 0.5% Asian, <0.1% Native Hawaiian and Pacific Islander, 0.5% from some other race, and 4.2% from two or more races. Hispanic or Latino residents of any race comprised 0.9% of the population.

19.6% of residents lived in urban areas, while 80.4% lived in rural areas.

There were 11,665 households in the county, of which 29.2% had children under the age of 18 living in them. Of all households, 47.8% were married-couple households, 18.4% were households with a male householder and no spouse or partner present, and 26.0% were households with a female householder and no spouse or partner present. About 29.0% of all households were made up of individuals and 14.2% had someone living alone who was 65 years of age or older.

There were 13,430 housing units, of which 13.1% were vacant. Among occupied housing units, 71.1% were owner-occupied and 28.9% were renter-occupied. The homeowner vacancy rate was 2.0% and the rental vacancy rate was 7.7%.

=== Racial and ethnic composition ===
Gallia County, Ohio – racial and ethnic composition Note: the US Census treats Hispanic/Latino as an ethnic category. This table excludes Latinos from the racial categories and assigns them to a separate category. Hispanics/Latinos may be of any race.
Race / ethnicity (NH = Non-Hispanic)	Pop 1980	Pop 1990	Pop 2000	Pop 2010	Pop 2020	% 1980	% 1990	% 2000	% 2010	% 2020
White alone (NH)	28,813	29,727	29,458	29,150	26,955	95.73%	96.04%	94.81%	94.23%	92.25%
Black or African American alone (NH)	906	856	834	800	597	3.01%	2.77%	2.68%	2.59%	2.04%
Native American or Alaska Native alone (NH)	66	72	131	108	55	0.22%	0.23%	0.42%	0.35%	0.19%
Asian alone (NH)	108	133	110	139	148	0.36%	0.43%	0.35%	0.45%	0.51%
Native Hawaiian or Pacific Islander alone (NH)	x	x	0	0	5	x	x	0.00%	0.00%	0.02%
Other race alone (NH)	16	10	22	16	79	0.05%	0.03%	0.07%	0.05%	0.27%
Mixed-race or multiracial (NH)	x	x	323	446	1,119	x	x	1.04%	1.44%	3.83%
Hispanic or Latino (any race)	189	156	191	275	262	0.63%	0.50%	0.61%	0.89%	0.90%
Total	30,098	30,954	31,069	30,934	29,220	100.00%	100.00%	100.00%	100.00%	100.00%

=== 2010 census ===
As of the 2010 United States census, there were 30,934 people, 12,062 households, and 8,264 families living in the county. The population density was 66.3 inhabitants per square mile (25.6/km^{2}). There were 13,925 housing units at an average density of 29.8 units per square mile (11.5 units/km^{2}). The racial makeup of the county was 94.7% white, 2.6% black or African American, 0.5% Asian, 0.4% American Indian, 0.2% from other races, and 1.6% from two or more races. Those of Hispanic or Latino origin made up 0.9% of the population. In terms of ancestry, 18.6% were American, 15.9% were German, 15.6% were Irish, and 8.0% were English.

Of the 12,062 households, 31.9% had children under the age of 18 living with them, 51.9% were married couples living together, 11.6% had a female householder with no husband present, 31.5% were non-families, and 27.0% of all households were made up of individuals. The average household size was 2.49 and the average family size was 2.99. The median age was 39.9 years.

The median income for a household in the county was $37,409 and the median income for a family was $46,470. Males had a median income of $39,301 versus $30,068 for females. The per capita income for the county was $20,199. About 15.8% of families and 21.3% of the population were below the poverty line, including 30.7% of those under age 18 and 14.9% of those age 65 or over.

=== 2000 census ===
As of the census of 2000, there were 31,069 people, 12,060 households, and 8,586 families living in the county. The population density was 66 inhabitants per square mile (25/km^{2}). There were 13,498 housing units at an average density of 29 units per square mile (11/km^{2}). The racial makeup of the county was 95.26% White, 2.70% Black or African American, 0.43% Native American, 0.35% Asian, 0.15% from other races, and 1.11% from two or more races. 0.61% of the population were Hispanic or Latino of any race.

There were 12,060 households, out of which 33.00% had children under the age of 18 living with them, 56.50% were married couples living together, 11.00% had a female householder with no husband present, and 28.80% were non-families. 25.20% of all households were made up of individuals, and 10.40% had someone living alone who was 65 years of age or older. The average household size was 2.50 and the average family size was 2.98.

In the county, the population was spread out, with 25.00% under the age of 18, 9.70% from 18 to 24, 27.50% from 25 to 44, 24.20% from 45 to 64, and 13.60% who were 65 years of age or older. The median age was 37 years. For every 100 females, there were 95.40 males. For every 100 females age 18 and over, there were 92.10 males.

The median income for a household in the county was $30,191, and the median income for a family was $35,938. Males had a median income of $31,783 versus $22,829 for females. The per capita income for the county was $15,183. About 13.50% of families and 18.10% of the population were below the poverty line, including 25.20% of those under age 18 and 10.00% of those age 65 or over.

== Politics ==
Gallia County has been a Republican stronghold ever since that party was formed. Lyndon Johnson in his 1964 landslide is the solitary Democrat to win a majority of the county's vote in the presidential election, although James Buchanan in 1856 and Bill Clinton in 1996 won a plurality.

United States presidential election results for Gallia County, Ohio
Year	Republican		Democratic		Third party(ies)	
Year	No.	%	No.	%	No.	%
1856	610	19.32%	1,341	42.48%	1,206	38.20%
1860	1,881	52.54%	1,472	41.12%	227	6.34%
1864	2,828	70.75%	1,169	29.25%	0	0.00%
1868	2,678	62.31%	1,620	37.69%	0	0.00%
1872	2,855	64.40%	1,553	35.03%	25	0.56%
1876	3,202	58.07%	2,302	41.75%	10	0.18%
1880	3,488	59.92%	2,310	39.68%	23	0.40%
1884	3,690	60.67%	2,333	38.36%	59	0.97%
1888	3,651	61.33%	2,216	37.22%	86	1.44%
1892	3,547	61.99%	1,984	34.67%	191	3.34%
1896	4,247	63.66%	2,369	35.51%	55	0.82%
1900	4,159	62.82%	2,388	36.07%	73	1.10%
1904	3,880	67.51%	1,742	30.31%	125	2.18%
1908	3,914	63.48%	2,171	35.21%	81	1.31%
1912	1,355	25.23%	1,765	32.87%	2,250	41.90%
1916	2,860	54.71%	2,277	43.55%	91	1.74%
1920	5,388	67.40%	2,562	32.05%	44	0.55%
1924	4,325	61.21%	2,284	32.32%	457	6.47%
1928	5,513	73.42%	1,916	25.52%	80	1.07%
1932	5,646	56.45%	4,190	41.89%	166	1.66%
1936	6,700	59.42%	4,548	40.34%	27	0.24%
1940	7,285	64.88%	3,943	35.12%	0	0.00%
1944	6,464	68.53%	2,968	31.47%	0	0.00%
1948	5,743	62.38%	3,430	37.25%	34	0.37%
1952	6,763	68.20%	3,153	31.80%	0	0.00%
1956	7,040	70.99%	2,877	29.01%	0	0.00%
1960	7,602	68.49%	3,498	31.51%	0	0.00%
1964	4,408	48.19%	4,740	51.81%	0	0.00%
1968	5,134	58.10%	2,660	30.10%	1,042	11.79%
1972	6,506	72.40%	2,341	26.05%	139	1.55%
1976	5,198	50.38%	4,971	48.18%	148	1.43%
1980	6,469	56.73%	4,406	38.64%	529	4.64%
1984	8,194	65.27%	4,251	33.86%	109	0.87%
1988	7,399	59.92%	4,834	39.14%	116	0.94%
1992	5,776	42.04%	5,350	38.94%	2,612	19.01%
1996	5,135	41.19%	5,386	43.21%	1,945	15.60%
2000	7,511	58.79%	4,872	38.13%	393	3.08%
2004	8,576	61.29%	5,366	38.35%	51	0.36%
2008	8,247	61.68%	4,777	35.73%	347	2.60%
2012	7,750	61.40%	4,557	36.10%	315	2.50%
2016	9,822	75.53%	2,628	20.21%	554	4.26%
2020	10,645	77.14%	2,990	21.67%	164	1.19%
2024	10,314	79.13%	2,592	19.89%	128	0.98%

United States Senate election results for Gallia County, Ohio1
Year	Republican		Democratic		Third party(ies)	
Year	No.	%	No.	%	No.	%
2024	9,316	73.22%	2,912	22.89%	496	3.90%

== Communities ==
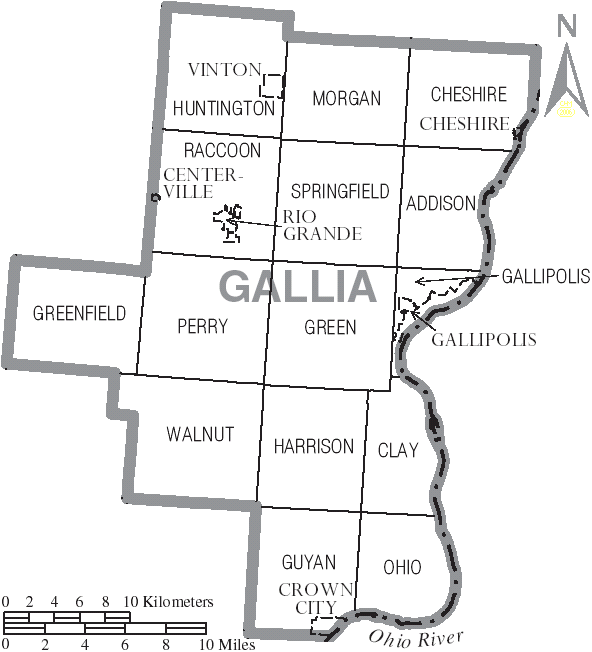
Map of Gallia County, with municipal and township labels

=== Villages ===
- Centerville
- Cheshire
- Crown City
- Gallipolis (county seat)
- Rio Grande
- Vinton

=== Townships ===
- Addison
- Cheshire
- Clay
- Gallipolis
- Green
- Greenfield
- Guyan
- Harrison
- Huntington
- Morgan
- Ohio
- Perry
- Raccoon
- Springfield
- Walnut

=== Census-designated place ===
- Bidwell
- Kanauga

=== Unincorporated communities ===
- Kerr
- Mercerville
- Northup
- Patriot

== See also ==
- National Register of Historic Places listings in Gallia County, Ohio
- Scioto Company (1787–1790)
