= Gallia (disambiguation) =

Gallia (English: Gaul), was a region of Western Europe during the Iron Age occupied by present-day France, Belgium and other neighbouring countries.

Gallia or Gallian may also refer to:

== Places ==
=== Roman provincia ===
- Roman Gaul, sometimes referred to as Roman Gallia, including:
  - Gallia Cisalpina in present-day north Italy, a propraetorial province sometimes referred to as Gallia Citerior, Provincia Ariminum, or Gallia Togata, subdivided into:
    - Gallia Transpadana, the part of Cisalpine Gaul between the river Po and the Alps
    - Gallia Cispadana, the part of Cisalpine Gaul to the south of the river Po
  - Gallia Narbonensis mainly in present-day south France, also known as Gallia Transalpina
  - Gallia Comata mainly in present-day west, central and north France, divided in 22 BC into three provincia:
    - Gallia Aquitania in present-day central and western France
    - Gallia Belgica mainly in present-day northeastern France and Belgium
    - Gallia Lugdunensis in present-day eastern and northern France
  - Gallia Viennensis, in present-day south France

=== Other places ===
- Excelsior Hotel Gallia, a hotel in Milan, Italy
- Γαλλία, Gallia, the Greek name for France
- Gallia Celtica, a region mainly in present-day France inhabited by Celts
- Gallia County, Ohio, a county in southern Ohio, United States
  - Gallia, Ohio, an unincorporated community in Gallia County
  - Gallia County Local School District, a school district in Gallia County, Ohio including:
    - North Gallia High School
    - South Gallia High School (Crown City, Ohio)
  - Gallia–Meigs Regional Airport, an airport in Gallia County, Ohio
  - Gallia County Courthouse, a courthouse in Gallia County, Ohio
- Natività di Nostro Signore Gesù Cristo a Via Gallia, a church in Rome

=== Fictional places ===
- Gallia, a fictional comet, setting for most of Jules Verne's Off on a Comet
- Gallia, a country in Nintendo's video games Fire Emblem: Path of Radiance and Fire Emblem: Radiant Dawn
- Gallia, the main setting for the Valkyria Chronicles, video game series produced by Sega

== People ==
=== Individuals ===
- Bert Gallia (1891–1976), American baseball player
- Chantal Gallia (1956–2022), Algerian-born French singer, humorist, and impersonator
- Fabio Gallia (1963–2024), Italian banker, manager and businessman
- Jason Gallian (born 1971), English cricketer
- Joseph Gallian (born 1942), American mathematician
- Ketti Gallian (1912–1972), French actress
- Maria Gallia (fl. 1703–1712), Italian-born British soprano
- Octave Gallian (1855–1918), French painter

=== Multiple persons or groups of people ===
- Gallia gens, an ancient Roman family
- Gallians, alumni of Lawrence College Ghora Gali
- Gauls, the pre-Roman inhabitants of Gaul
  - Gaulish language, spoken by the Gauls

=== Fictional people ===
- Gallia, a historic personification of France
- Gallia (goddess), a Gaulish goddess mentioned in an inscription found at the site of Vindolanda
- Gallian, a character in the Uwe Boll film In the Name of the King

== Arts and entertainment ==
- Commentarii de Bello Gallico, 58–49 BC account of the Gallic Wars by Julius Caesar, sometimes referred to by its opening phrase Gallia est omnis divisa in partes tres... or as Omnia Gallia
- Franco-Gallia, 1573 treatise by François Hotman
- Gallia (Gounod), 1871 motet by Charles Gounod
- Gallia (novel), 1895 novel by Ménie Muriel Dowie
- Gallia Protects Bavaria, an 1805 painting by Marianne Kürzinger
- Plaude Laetare Gallia, 1668 motet by Jean-Baptiste Lully and Pierre Perrin

== Sports ==
- Gallia Club International, a tennis tournament held 1924–1968
- Gallia Club Paris (founded 1896, disbanded 1940), a football club based in Paris, France
- GC Lucciana (Gallica Club de Lucciana), a football club based in Corsica, France

== Other ==
- 148 Gallia, an asteroid
- Gallia, another term for the chemical compound gallium(III) oxide, Ga_{2}O_{3}
- SS Gallia, a transatlantic ocean liner sunk during World War I by the German submarine U-35
- SS Gallia (1879), a ship built in 1878 and broken up in 1900
- Gallia Christiana, records of Catholic dioceses and abbeys in France
- Gallia family Hoffmann apartment collection, a set of furniture and decorative objects designed by Josef Hoffman
- Gallia Préhistoire, journal of prehistoric archaeology

== See also ==
- Galia
- Gallica (disambiguation)
- Gallic
- Galician
