= Ghalia =

Ghalia, Ghaliyya or Ghaliaa may refer to:

== People ==
=== Given name ===
- El Ghalia Djimi (born 1961), Sahrawi human rights activist
- Ghaliaa Chaker (born 1998), Syrian singer-songwriter and musician
- Ghalia Benali (born 1968), Tunisian singer-songwriter
- Ghalia bint Mohammed Al-Thani, Qatari medical doctor and former Minister of Public Health
- Ghalia Qabbani, Syrian writer and journalist
- Ghalia Sebti (born 1968), Moroccan alpine skier
- Ghalia Volt, Belgian singer-songwriter and musician
- Ghaliyya Al Bogammiah (died 1818), Saudi resistance fighter

=== Surname ===
- Hamza Abu-Ghalia (born 1980), Libyan weightlifter

== See also ==
- Galia
- Ghali
- Gialia
