= Galia =

Galia may refer to:

== People ==
=== Given name ===
- Galia Ackerman (born 1948), French-Russian writer and translator
- Galia Angelova (born 1972), Bulgarian tennis player
- Galia Bernstein, author of I Am a Cat (Bernstein book)
- Galia Dafni, mathematician
- Galia Durant, musician and co-founder of Psapp
- Galia Dvorak (born 1988), Spanish table tennis player
- Galia Moss, Mexican adventurer
- Galia Sabar (born 1963), Israeli professor
- Galia Solomonoff (born 1968), Argentinian-born architect and creative director
- Galia Yishai (1950–2020), Israeli actress

=== Surname ===
- Jean Galia (1905–1949), a French rugby footballer
- Lars Top-Galia, guitarist and member of Sort Sol
- Martin Galia (born 1979), Czech handball player
- Roberto Galia (born 1963), Italian football player and coach

=== Fictional ===
- Galia, character in the 1866 ballet Le Poisson doré
- Galia, character in the 1983–1986 Israeli TV series Krovim Krovim
- Galia, character in the 1997 Japanese film Slayers Great
- Galia, character in the 2009 English-language Israeli action film The Assassin Next Door
- Galia, character in the 2009 film Saturn Returns (film)
- Galia, the name of the Queen Amanoa character in the fictional Star Wars Expanded Universe
- Galia Shapira, character in the 2012 Israeli film Melting Away

== Places ==
- Gália, a municipality in the state of São Paulo, Brazil
- Galia, Greece, a village on the island of Crete, Greece
- Ge'alya, a moshav in Israel
- Nueva Galia, a village in Argentina

== Art ==
- Galia, a 1967 novel by Vahé Katcha
  - Quitte ou double, Galia, a 1968 novel by Vahé Katcha, sequel to Galia
- Galia (film), a 1966 film directed by Georges Lautner

== Other uses ==
- Galia melon, a type of melon similar to a cantaloupe
- Galia Lahav, Israeli fashion label
- Ğäliä, a madrasa in Ufa
- Galia, con quien tanto quería a 2002 novel by Uruguayan author Suleika Ibáñez

== See also ==
- Gallia
- Gialia
- Gallia (disambiguation)
- Ghalia
- Galea
