= Ghali =

Ghali or Al-Ghali may refer to:

== People ==
Mononym

- Ghali (rapper), Italian rapper of Tunisian origin

Name

- El Ghali Boukaa, Moroccan equestrian
- Ghali Umar Na'Abba, Nigerian politician

Surname

- Boutros Ghali, Egyptian politician
- Fathia Ghali, Egyptian princess
- Mohammad Mahmoud Ghali, Egyptian scholar
- Salah Ali Al-Ghali, Sudanese politician
- Samia Ghali, French politician

== Religion ==
- A person belonging to the ghulat (a plural noun derived from Arabic ghali), minority Shia Muslim groups who ascribe divine characteristics to members of Muhammad's family.

== Others ==
- Ghali (ship), several type of ships from Nusantara region

== See also ==
- Ghalia
- Ghaly (disambiguation)
