= George Floyd protests in Ohio =

2020 civil unrest after the murder of George Floyd

- Part of George Floyd protests
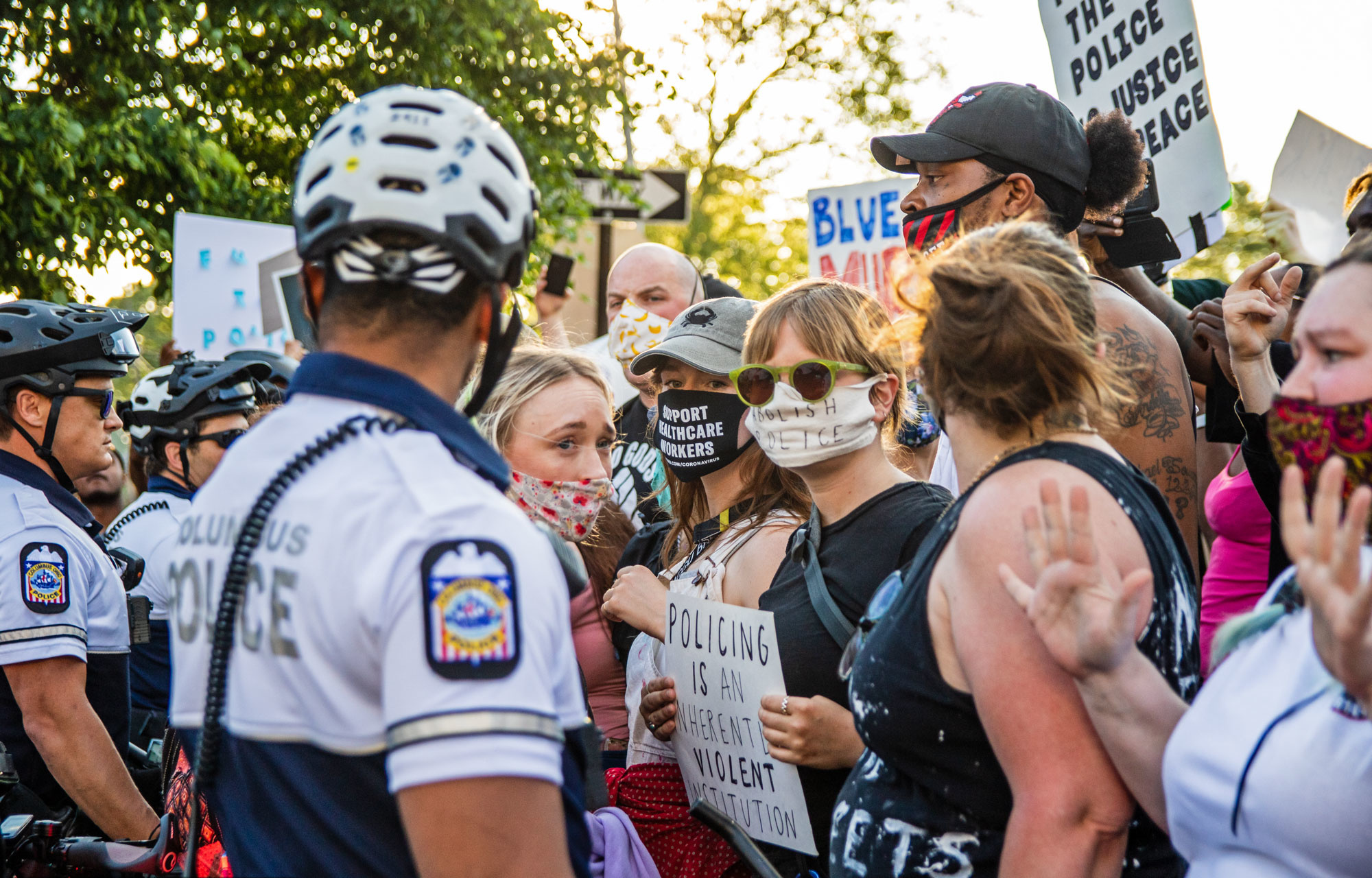
- Protesters in Columbus on May 28 blocked by police
- Date: May 28 – September 2020 (3 months and 4 days)
- Location: Ohio, United States
- Caused by: Police brutality; Institutional racism against African Americans; Reaction to the murder of George Floyd; Economic, racial and social inequality
- Ohio cities with protests of 100 people or more

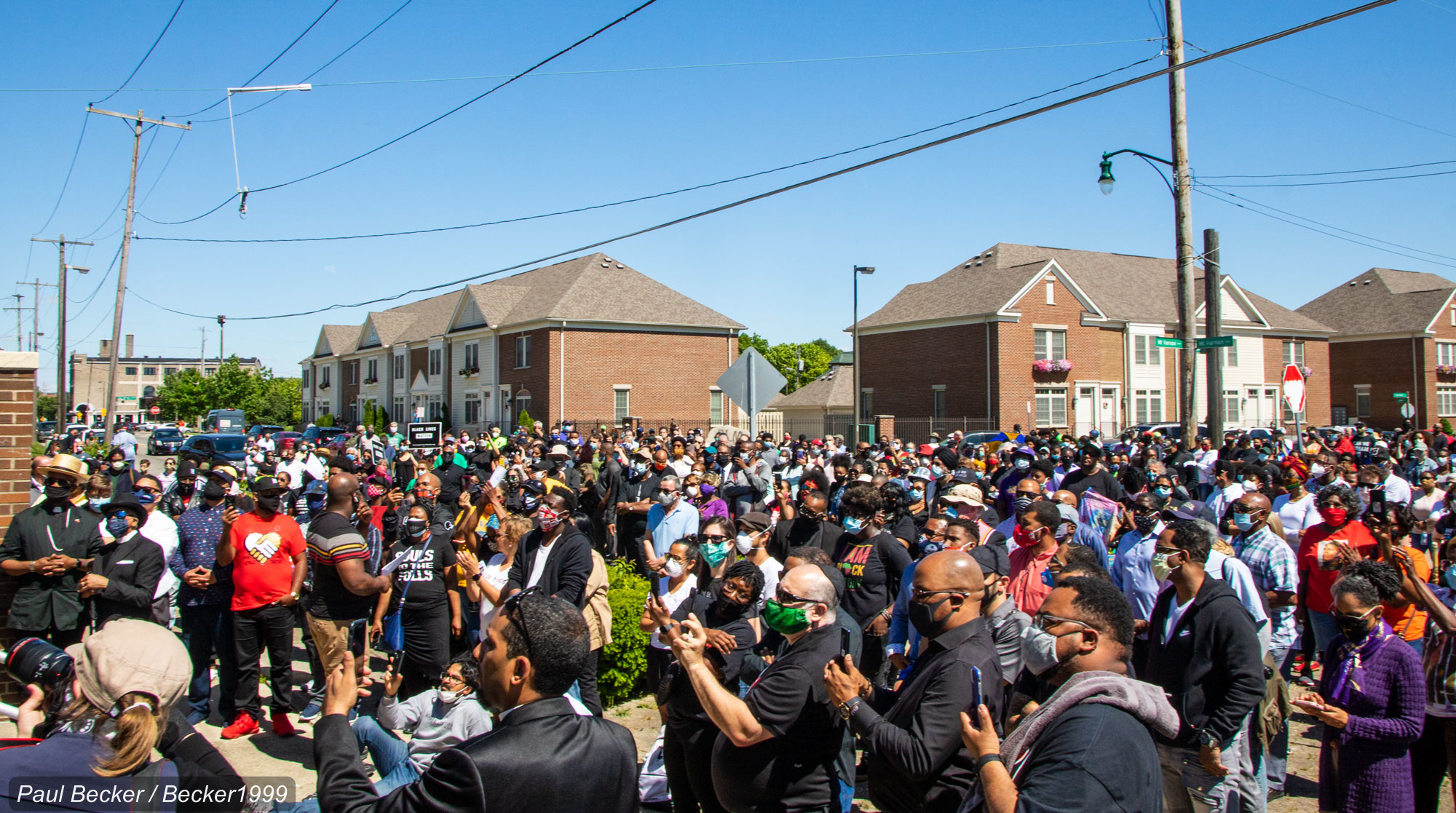
Protesters in Columbus

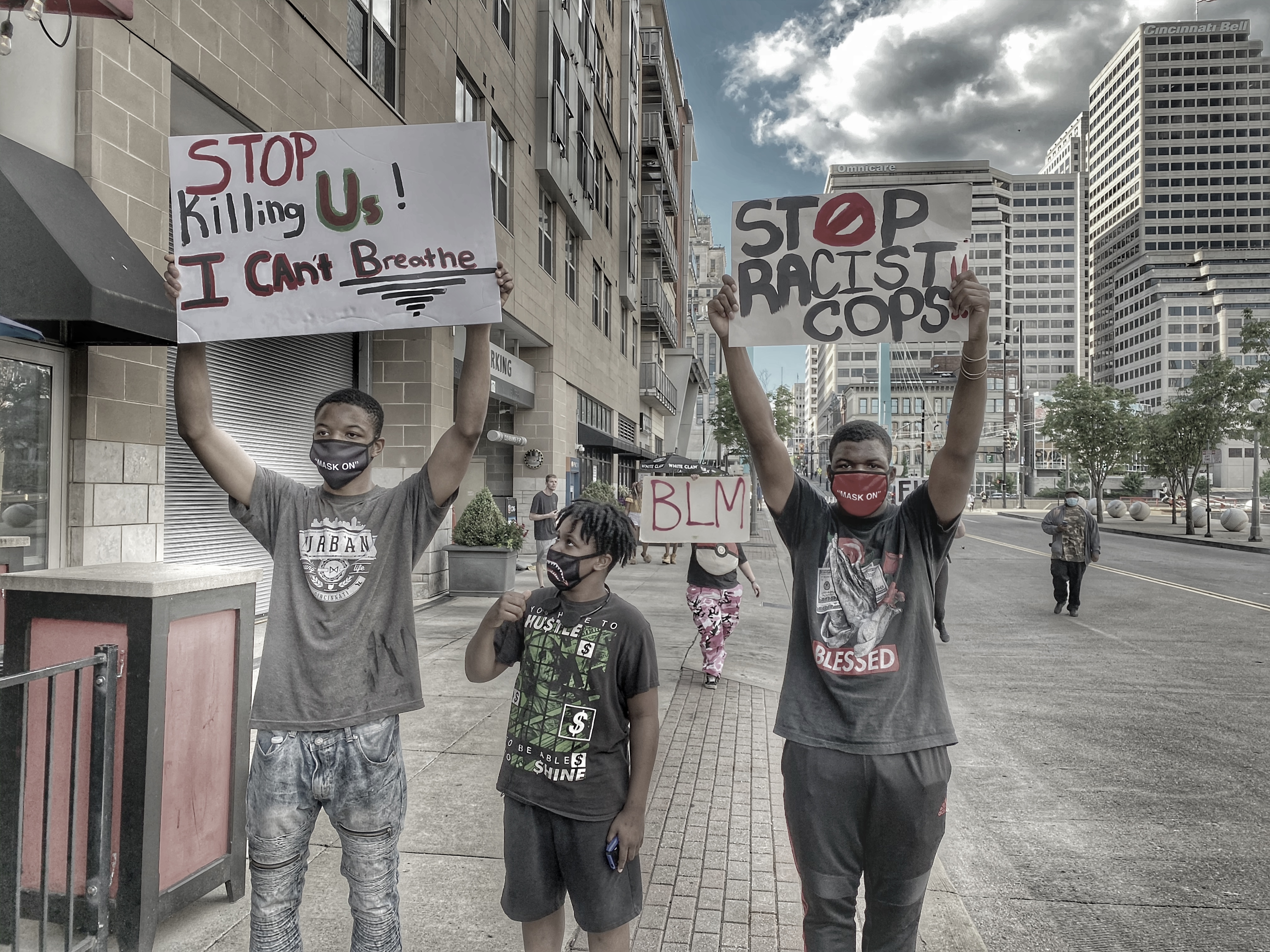
Protesters in Cincinnati on May 30

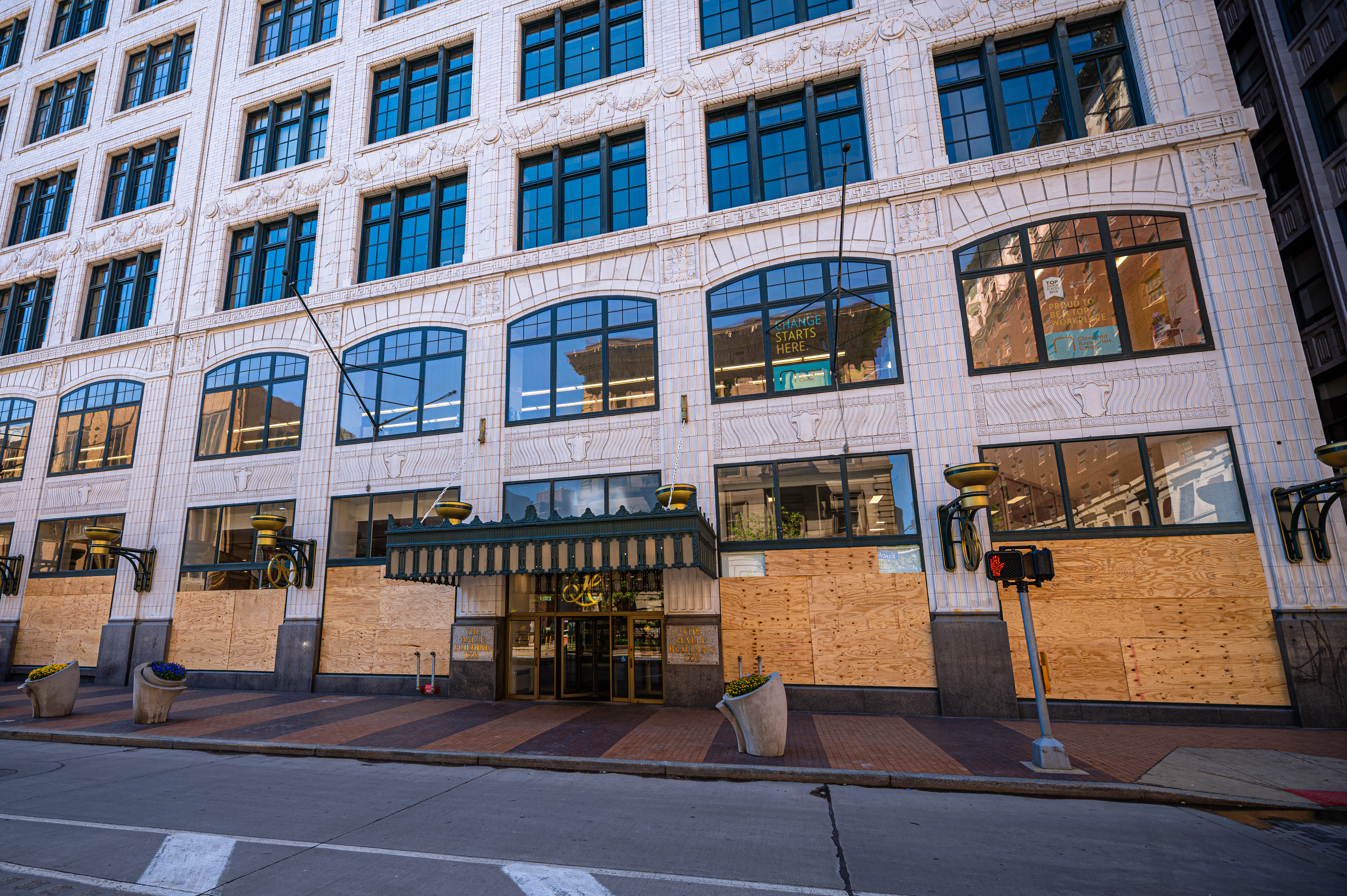
Plywood covered windows on Cleveland's Halle Building which were shattered on May 30

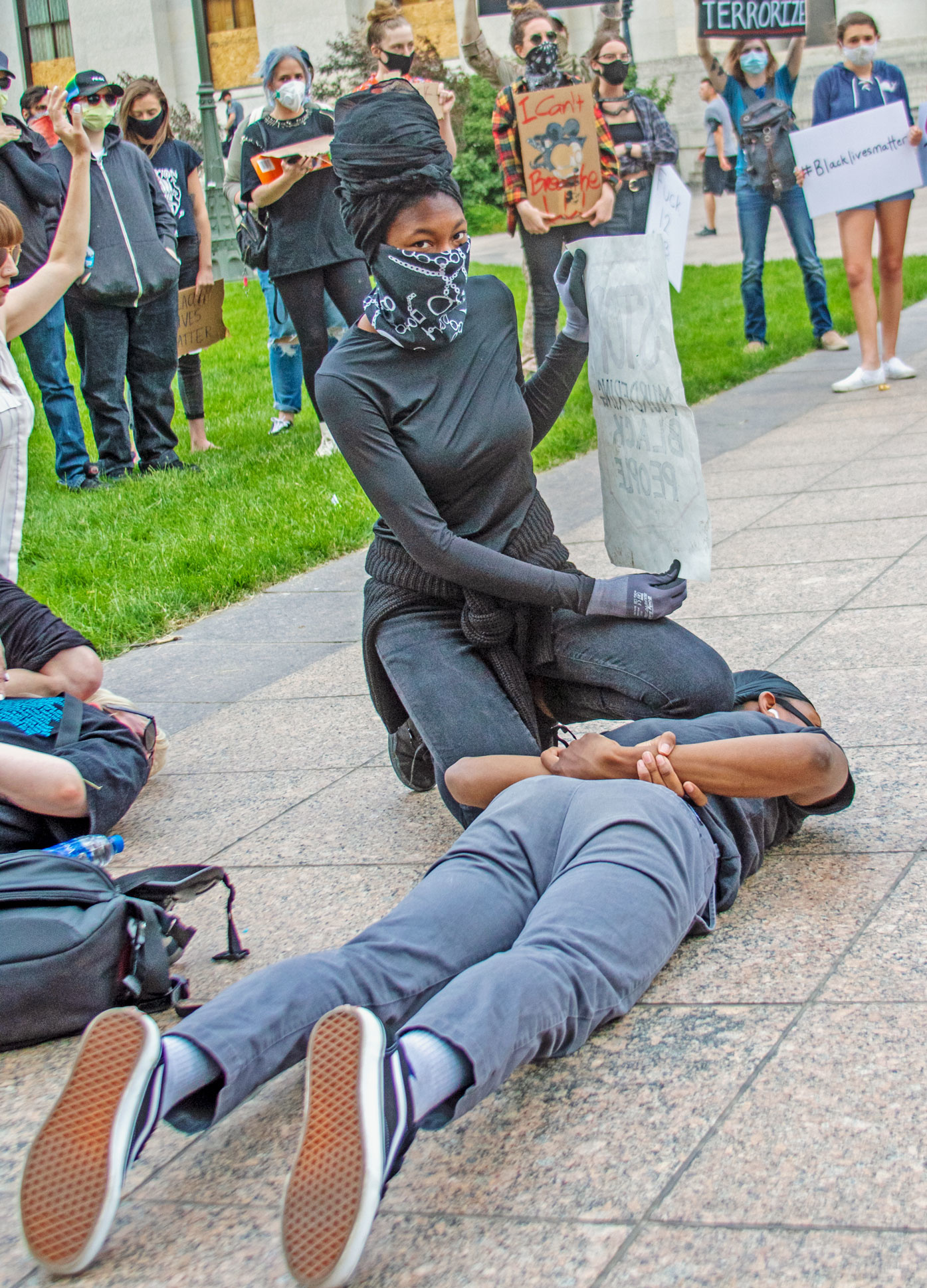
Columbus on June 1

Beginning on May 28, 2020, a number of cities in Ohio saw protests against the murder of George Floyd. Major cities such as Columbus, Cleveland, Cincinnati and Dayton had large protests, and numerous smaller cities and towns saw demonstrations as well. As a result of rioting and looting, a number of cities such as Cleveland, Columbus, Dayton, Cincinnati and Springfield imposed curfews of varying times.

== By location ==
- Akron: Several hundred protesters rallied at Hardesty Park on May 30. Five men were arrested on misdemeanor charges. An 18-year-old woman was hospitalized with a concussion and a broken leg after a truck veered into the crowd downtown. The driver told officers he was just trying to get away from the protesters. He has not been charged.
- Amherst: Approximately 250 people marched from a former nursing home to the town hall. Protesters marched peacefully with the local police force in solidarity. Upon arriving at the town hall, protesters knelt for 9 minutes and were only interrupted by a single counter-protester.
- Ashland: On June 5, more than 50 protested on Main Street in the pouring rain. Some pledged to continue doing so daily.
- Ashtabula: Protesters peacefully gathered on June 6 at Kevin Cornelius Memorial Park.
- Athens: About 100 people protested at Ohio University on May 30.
- Avon: On June 6, Avon High School students led hundreds of protesters in a peaceful march.
- Bay Village: On June 3, 40 people peacefully protested in front of the Bay Village Police Department. On June 5, 100 people marched through the city. Stopping once to lay down for 9 minutes to memorialize George Floyd.
- Beachwood: Over 1,000 people peacefully protested near Beachwood City Hall on June 11.
- Beavercreek: Protests were organized Monday night in some Dayton-area suburbs, including Centerville and Beavercreek, in response to the murder of George Floyd. Tear gas was deployed by police on protesters in Beavercreek on June 2, and the city subsequently issued a curfew.
- Bethel: Between 80 and 100 protesters gathered for a "Solidarity with Black Lives Demonstration" on June 14. About 700 counter-protesters including motorcycle gangs, "back-the-blue groups" and second amendment activists overwhelmed Bethel's six officer police force leading to at least 10 criminal incidents that remain under investigation. A protest was held with hundreds of participants in Cincinnati on July 4.
- Bluffton: 400 or more people attended a walk of silence starting at Bluffton University before making their way to Main Street and congregating there to listen to the experiences of people of color living in the town on June 1.
- Bowling Green: 400 to 500 people attended a peaceful protest, starting at the Wood County Courthouse and Jail and later moving downtown the evening of May 31.
- Bryan: On June 5, about two dozen people took part in a peaceful protest in downtown Bryan.
- Bucyrus: On June 6, a crowd of about 100 protesters marched from Washington Square through downtown Bucyrus to protest the murder of George Floyd.
- Canton: Several hundred people marched along Tuscarawas Street the evening of May 29. When a small group of protesters started throwing rocks, tear gas was used to disperse the crowd, and at least two arrests were made. Protests continued in Canton for at least five more days.
- Carey: Small groups of peaceful protesters gathered in downtown Carey during the first week of June.
- Centerville: Protests were organized Monday night in some Dayton-area suburbs, including Centerville and Beavercreek, in response to the murder of George Floyd.
- Chagrin Falls: Over 150 protesters gathered on June 2 to protest in Chagrin Falls' Riverside Park, despite the official protest being cancelled due to threats and fears from the community over violence. Another march was held on June 4, over 200 protesters marched from Chagrin Falls High School to Riverside Park.
- Chillicothe: About 50 people protested at the Ross County courthouse the afternoon of May 30.
- Cincinnati: On May 29, over 500 protesters marched from the Hamilton County Courthouse through Over-the-Rhine; the protest began peacefully, but around 9:30 p.m., tension grew with looting and vandalism occurring overnight. At the Hamilton County Justice Center, an American flag was torn down and a window was smashed. Protesters blocked traffic on Interstate 75. Police used "multiple rounds" of pepper bombs as well as pepper spray canisters to disperse the crowds of protesters. All police are on 12-hour shifts with time off being cancelled to free up space. On May 30, Cincinnati Mayor John Cranley erected a curfew beginning at 10:00 p.m. and ending at 6:00 a.m. on Saturday and Sunday in the downtown area. On June 1, some protesters in downtown Cincinnati threw firecrackers and between 40 and 50 were arrested for violating the curfew. Those arrested complained about the conditions of their incarceration. On June 7, over 15,000 protesters peacefully marched from Fountain Square to the Hamilton County Courthouse, including veterans from the Cincinnati riots of 2001.
- Cleveland: According to the Cleveland Police Department, the protests starting on May 30 began peacefully, however, police had to disperse crowds after some protesters allegedly began throwing objects. Several businesses were vandalized and looted, and a curfew was activated beginning at 8pm and ending at 8am, local time, for Saturday May 30, 2020 and Sunday May 31, 2020. Mayor Frank G. Jackson reported in a press conference on Sunday that 66 people were arrested, 20 were hospitalized, and that the Cleveland Division of Fire responded to 20 calls of fires, ranging from structure fires, car fires and various other small fires. Security footage from the Justice Center revealed that the police account was incorrect and property damage occurred only after police shot pepper spray, tear gas and pepper balls at peaceful protesters. Police chief Calvin's claim that protesters were trying to break into the Justice Center has not been corroborated by hundreds of hours of security footage. Cleveland police officer John Kazimer struck a peaceful protester with a baton and pepper sprayed a woman who was holding a sign.
- Cleveland Heights: There were two peaceful protests in Cleveland Heights, one on June 3 and the other on June 14.
- Columbus: Protesters broke into the Ohio Statehouse and vandalized several businesses the evening of May 28. Protesters blocked traffic on Interstate 71 near 15th Street. Later, protesters began throwing bottles, leading police to disperse pepper spray into the crowd. Some protesters threw the pepper spray back at police officers, as well as other items. As police had the protesters move back to N. High Street and State Street, some protesters broke the windows of businesses and bus stops there. They also smashed the front doors and windows of the State Capitol Building, with some gaining entrance to the Statehouse. At N. High Street and Town Street, some protesters began looting. Protesters also tore trash cans and mailboxes from their mounts. The Ohio Theatre was damaged. The Columbus Association for the Performing Arts estimated the damage at $15,000. Protests continued on May 29, with protesters disrupting traffic at Front Street. Some protesters threw water bottles, rocks, and bricks and shot fireworks at officers. Additional businesses in the Short North district were looted. Five police officers were injured during the protests. The Columbus Police Department declared an emergency. Over 100 properties were damaged throughout the night. Five people were arrested that day for setting off fireworks and creating a panic, and five police officers were injured, at least two by rocks and bricks thrown at them. On May 30, Governor Mike DeWine called in the Ohio National Guard, with Ohio Highway Patrol officers to help with law enforcement. Police were unable to respond to regular calls due to the protests. Protests into the night involved demonstrators throwing items. Around 9:35 p.m., the city responded to a trash fire at a construction site downtown, near where protests were held. The curfew went into effect for the first time at 10 p.m. on May 30. 59 people were arrested following the May 30 protests.
- Dayton: A rally was called for the afternoon of May 30 at the Walter H. Rice Federal Building to honor Floyd and Ahmaud Arbery. Religious leaders and a school board member spoke. Several hundred protesters attended. Eventually, police used tear gas to disperse three different groups because they were blocking traffic.
- Delaware: About 400 people attended a vigil for George Floyd downtown the evening of May 30.
- East Cleveland: About three-dozen people peacefully protested in front of city hall on June 1.
- East Liverpool: On May 30, about 50 to a hundred people protested peacefully in front of City Hall.
- Elyria: Over 100 people attended a listening rally at Elyria City Hall on June 2.
- Euclid: Hundreds marched in the city on June 3. A peaceful march from the Euclid Public Library to the police station occurred on June 7.
- Findlay: On June 1, dozens of people protested peacefully in front of the Hancock County Courthouse, despite the event having been officially postponed by the organizer due to death threats.
- Fremont: On June 3, Fremont Mayor Danny Sanchez led hundreds of residents in a peaceful protest. Police officers walked alongside the protesters.
- Gallipolis: Hundreds of protesters marched from the Gallipolis City Band stand to the Gallia Courthouse on June 9.
- Hamilton: Hundreds protested the morning of May 31 by marching around the Butler County courthouse seven times.
- Kent: On May 30, dozens of people gathered near Main Street Bridge for a peaceful protest.
- Lakewood: On the evening of June 2, protesters peacefully marched through Lakewood.
- Lima: On the afternoon of May 30, protesters peacefully marched to the Lima police station, where they knelt for nine minutes in honor of George Floyd. The mayor and police chief of Lima both encouraged the protests as long as they remained peaceful.
- Lorain: Approximately 100 peaceful protests occurred the afternoon of May 31 in the form of a march.
- Mansfield: Hundreds peacefully protested in Mansfield's Central Park the afternoon of May 30.
- Marion: Hundreds protested outside Marion City Hall on May 30.
- Mason: On June 12, local high school students organized a peaceful protest running down Mason-Montgomery Road and ending at the Mason Community Center where 9 minutes and 18 minutes of silence were observed in honor of George Floyd.
- Maumee: On June 5, over 400 protesters gathered in Maumee to support Black Lives Matter.
- Medina: On June 6 there was a peaceful protest in Medina's Public Square.
- Mentor: A silent peaceful protest was held on July 10. Protesters marched from Veterans Park to Mentor Civic Center for speeches.
- Mount Vernon: On June 1, around 700 people took part in a peaceful rally at Public Square.
- New Philadelphia: On May 31, several hundred people in downtown New Philadelphia peacefully demonstrated against the murder of George Floyd. They marched from the Tuscarawas County Courthouse to Tuscora Park, accompanied by sheriff's deputies on horses.
- Newark: Over 150 people peacefully protested at the Licking County courthouse the afternoon of May 31.
- North Canton: About 50 people withstood a rainstorm and protested peacefully on June 4, in front of the old Hoover Company plant on South Main Street. The Police Chief and other officers provided safety support, setting up barricades for the protesters.
- Norwalk: A protest was held at the Huron County courthouse the afternoon of May 30.
- Olmsted Falls: About 180 people protested peacefully in front of the Olmsted Falls Police Department Headquarters on June 6.
- Parma: On June 6, two separate protests drew over 300 people. The first protest was organized by the UAW at Local 1005 union hall, while the second saw protesters march from Zielinski Park to Parma City Hall. Both events remained peaceful.
- Perrysburg: On June 3, a group of local teenagers led hundreds of protesters in a march from Woodlands Park to the police station and back to protest police violence.
- Piqua: About 60 to 100 people protested peacefully the evening of May 31.
- Portsmouth: More than 100 people peacefully protested at Spartan Stadium and the Portsmouth Police Department on May 31.
- Ravenna: On June 1, around 40 protesters met at the Portage County Courthouse.
- Sandusky: About 30 people held a peaceful protest outside the Erie County courthouse the afternoon of May 31. By June 1, over 1,500 people were protesting.
- Shaker Heights: Community members gathered for a peaceful candlelight vigil at Gridley Triangle Park on June 6.
- Solon: On June 11 an interfaith prayer vigil was held at the Solon Gazebo on SOM Center and Bainbridge Roads.
- South Euclid: On June 20, community members marched in the area around Bexley Park.
- Springboro: Several community members gathered in an organized protest at North Park on June 3.
- Springfield: A large, peaceful protest took place downtown the afternoon of May 31, organized by the local NAACP chapter. After an initial dispersement that evening, a smaller group formed late in the night. After some threw rocks and other objects at police officers, tear gas canisters were deployed and some businesses were vandalized. A curfew for the downtown area was enacted the following night.
- Steubenville: About 50 people protested May 30 in front of the city building, with the mayor joining the protesters.
- Strongsville: On June 6 protesters gathered at Strongsville Square on Pearl and Royalton Roads.
- Toledo: On Saturday, May 30, hundreds protested in Downtown Toledo. The peaceful protest turned violent when, unprompted, the police deployed tear gas and rubber bullets into the crowd in response to a sole instigator. The Mayor of Toledo issued a curfew for parts of Downtown, Toledo on Saturday May 30 from 9pm to 6am. On Sunday May 31 a peaceful protest occurred near the Franklin Park Mall, however at times blocking traffic on Monroe St. and some point walking 3 miles down to Secor Rd.
- University Heights: Over 250 people marched to University Heights City Hall to protest on June 23.
- Van Wert: On June 2, over 100 people marched from Fountain Park to Jubilee Park to protest the murder of George Floyd. At Jubilee Park, the protesters held a moment of silence for eight minutes at forty-six seconds to honor Floyd.
- Warren: On June 1, approximately 1,000-1,500 people peacefully marched from Perkins Park to the Trumbull County Courthouse to protest the murder of George Floyd. On June 7, protesters gathered at Warren Community Amphitheatre for more peaceful protests.
- Wooster: Over 100 people peacefully protested at the Wooster public square the afternoon of May 31.
- Yellow Springs: On May 30, hundreds of people peacefully protested on the streets of Yellow Springs.
- Youngstown: Thousands of people participated in a peaceful march organized by The Mahoning Valley Sojourn to the Past on the afternoon of May 31, which was followed by a smaller, continuing protest in which groups blocked traffic on Interstate 680. This protest was dispersed by police. As a result of this, Youngstown and several bordering towns imposed curfews for the night of May 31.
- Zanesville: Kyle Johnson and Melissa Dickinson of St. Paul A.M.E led Over 500 protesters in downtown Zanesville on the evening of May 30.
