= Ghaly =

Ghaly may refer to:

- Iyad Ag Ghaly (born c.1954), Tuareg militant against the Malian government
- Hossam Ghaly (born 1982), Egyptian footballer, has played for Egypt and clubs including Al Ahly, Feyenoord and Tottenham
- Mohamed Salah (born 1992), Egyptian footballer, currently plays for Liverpool and Egypt

== See also ==
- Ghali (disambiguation)
