= Galea =

Galea may refer to:

- Galea (surname)
- Galea (botany), a helmet-shaped structure in certain flowers
- Galea (genus), a genus of rodents
- Galea (helmet), ancient Roman helmet
- Galea (insects), part of the maxilla in the mouthparts of insects
- Galea shark, a superorder of sharks
- Galeas, a type of small trade vessel

== See also ==
- Galea aponeurotica, a fibrous tissue covering the cranium
