= Gallia family Hoffmann apartment collection =

Vienna Succession furniture collection in National Museum of Victoria

The Gallia family Hoffman apartment collection is a set of furniture and decorative objects that are the surviving Vienna Secession style contents of the 1913 apartment of wealthy Austrian businessman Moritz Gallia (1858–1918) and his wife and Hermine (née Hamburger), mostly designed by leading architect and designer Josef Hoffman. When the Gallia's children had to flee the Anschluss with Nazi Germany in 1938, they brought what remained with them to Australia, a place 'as far away as they could get', where it was subsequently purchased in 1976 by National Gallery of Victoria, and pieces have been on permanent display since 1984.

== History ==
=== Commissioning the interiors ===
Moritz Gallia came from a small Moravian town, while Hermine Hamberger (who was also his niece) came from Silesia, marrying in 1893 at the Stadttempel, Vienna's main synagogue, and together they would have four children in the 1890s (as well as converting to Catholicism). In 1892 Moritz became a director of Auers Gasglühlicht-AG, marketing the extremely popular gas mantle developed by Carl Auer von Welsbach, Moritz Gallia (1858–1918), developing a very high income by 1900. By then they had become patrons of the arts, in particular supporters of the avant-garde Vienna Secession from its inception in 1897, and the Wiener Werkstätte from its establishment in 1903 (he eventually became a vice-chairman of the Werkstatte board in 1914). Like other wealthy Viennese, Moritz commissioned a small apartment building that included a large apartment for the family, which was designed by architect Franz von Krauss, and built in Vienna's District IV, at No 4, Wohllebengasse ('Good Living Street') in 1911–12.

Through the Werkstatte, the couple had become friends with artists Koloman Moser and Gustav Klimt, and purchased many household objects from the Werkstatte, some designed by Josef Hoffman, and they not only purchased work by Klimt, but in 1903 commissioned a portrait of Hermine (now in the collection of the National Gallery, London). They commissioned Hoffman to design the interiors of the five main rooms of their new apartment as 'gesamtkunstwerk', designing all elements from furniture to carpets to chandeliers. The rooms were not finally complete until March 1914, but the Gallias had taken up residence in late 1913. The apartment was widely published, including in Austria's leading interior design magazine, Das Interieur, the German magazines Innen-Dekoration and Deutsche Kunst und Dekoration, and in Max Eisler's Österreichische Werkkultur.

The outbreak of WW1 quickly curtailed the Gallia's lifestyle, and after Moritz died in 1918, postwar inflation and turmoil severely reduced the family's fortunes. After Hermine died in 1936, daughters Gretl and Kathe kept the apartment and rented it out, complete with the huge dining table and chairs, and divided much of the remainder of the contents between them for their own apartments.

=== Coming to Australia ===
Soon after the Anschluss of Austria by Nazi Germany in March 1938, with enormous pressure on Austrians with a Jewish background to leave (none of the family had been practicing Jews but they were not exempt), the three surviving children decided to emigrate together to Australia, partly because it was as far away as possible. Because the Hoffman furniture, Wiener Werkstatte household objects and even the Klimt artworks were deemed to be 'modern', the sisters managed to obtain permission to take with them all the furniture they still had, including two pianos, three sets of cutlery, and the chandeliers. This probably represents the most complete modernist apartment contents in Vienna to have been retained from this period. They arrived in Sydney in early January, followed six weeks later by their possessions, which filled a spacious flat they shared in Cremorne, and which took the removalists four days to unpack.

The sisters each settled into a new life in Australia. Gretl's daughter Annelore became Anne, and in 1948 married fellow Austrian Jewish refugee Eric Bonyhady, and they had two children, Bruce and Tim, who were all frequent visitors to the flat. In the 1960s, Kathe offered The Art Gallery of New South Wales the Klimt portrait of Hermine, but they declined, believing that Australians 'would have little interest'; so it was sold at auction in 1971 at Christie's London to dealers, and in 1976 it was acquired by the National Gallery in London.

=== Purchase by the National Gallery of Victoria ===
Gretl died in 1975, and Kathe in 1976, and Anne, realising the value of the family's collection and wanting to keep it together, sold it to the National Gallery of Victoria for $25,000, as they had a significant collection of furniture and decorative art, and had expressed the most interest. By this time what remained was mainly the smaller timber furniture and the decorative objects; none of the numerous sofas and armchairs or the chandeliers remained.

Following conservation and restoration, in 1984 the furniture and decorative objects of the Gallia family apartment was the centrepiece of an exhibition titled Vienna 1913, complete with the Klimt portrait of Hermine on loan from London. Selections of the furniture, glassware and fabrics have been on permanent display in the decorative arts galleries since that time.

In 1995, the Gallery acquired the contents of another early 20th Century Viennese apartment, which also arrived in Australia in 1938; two rooms designed by noted architect Adolf Loos in 1901 for the Langer family.

After Anne's death in 2003, Tim Bonyhady, delving into cupboards full of family papers and documents, and archives both in Australia and in Vienna, published Good Living Street: The Fortunes of My Viennese Family in July 2011. The collection was again part of a major exhibition in late 2011, Vienna: Art & Design, and in 2012 the book won a NSW Premier's Literary Award. In 2013 it was published in German in Austria, where it was widely reviewed and compared with The Hare with Amber Eyes, published in German in 2011, the story of another far wealthier Viennese Jewish family who lost everything except a collection of Japanese Netsuke.

In 2018, plans, elevations and models of the interiors were prepared to form part of a research collection at the Milan Polytechnic Interiors course.

== The collection ==
The style

The apartment and its furniture were designed when Hoffman's style was evolving from the simple, geometric designs typical of the Vienna Secession to incorporate stylised references to classical and traditional design. For instance in architecture, while the 1905 Palais Stoclet was composed of unadorned rectangular and stepped outlines, his design for the German Pavilion at the 1914 Cologne Werkbund exhibition was composed of giant abstract fluted pilasters, topped by stylised pediments. The Gallia furniture explores these influences while remaining abstracted and highly original, with the ebonised hall furniture featuring wide classical fluting, while the lighter smoking room ebonised furniture features more delicate fluting. Other traditional features include the elongated cross pattern of some chair backs and the cupboard doors, carved floral elements, especially the vertical divisions of the smoking room bookcases, while the pale colours, carved gilt highlights and tapering legs of the boudoir furniture may be an influence from Louis XVI furniture.

Salon

This was the central and largest room, where musical evenings and receptions were held. The walls were painted yellow, a large carpet with a floral border covered much of the floor, and there were three hanging crystal chandeliers. The furniture was light brown fruitwood, the upholstery black with white trim. There were three sets of tables and chairs, a large central set consisting of a semi-circular upholstered couch and two matching armchairs around a circular table, and a grand piano.

It is not certain how much of this furniture was shipped to Australia, but Anne used some (with new upholstery) in her own first house in 1948. Apart from objects, the only item from this room in the gallery collection appears to be the carpet.

Boudoir

The boudoir had an air of lightness and refinement, the opposite to the heavy furniture and bold, often dark colours of the other rooms. The floor was wall to wall grey-green carpet, and the walls hung with blue silk, both embellished with a grid pattern of red and green rose sprays, and at least one hanging domed crystal chandelier. There was a built-in seating nook flanked by fluted square columns, a vitrine, a bureau, a card table and four upright chairs, and three armchairs and a sofa with a small round table. The timber furniture, with delicate lines and tapering elongated legs, was painted off white, with carved details picked out in gold leaf, and the upholstery was Chinese red corded silk, outlined with crisp black and white braid.

The collection in the gallery includes the bureau, the card table, the four upright chairs, the vitrine, and the round table.

The collection also includes a reproduction of the red silk suite, manufactured by Wittman, Vienna, in 1981, which is still in production, and known as the Villa Gallia suite.

Hall

The hall was a spacious room in itself, with a smaller dining table and chairs suitable for more informal family use, a settee, and two sideboards, and there were four domed hanging lamps.

The furniture for the hall is the heaviest in design, the woodwork in fluted ebonised wood, with solid chair backs, wide table legs, and solid sideboard front, lending an almost monumental quality. The undulating lines of the chair armrests provided a softer note, and the burgundy leather upholstery added an element of colour.

The collection includes the dining table, five armchairs, and the two sideboards, plus another shallow cupboard and the mirror.

Smoking Room

The smoking room served as a study and family room. There was a geometric patterned rug and patterned wallpaper above the bookcases. The furniture was again in ebonised wood, but lighter proportions, enlivened by carved panels, with deep green velvet upholstery, and included a large desk, three low bookcases, a couch and a number of armchairs, and two smaller tables.

The collection includes the very long bookcase, the two side cabinets, card table, sideboard, table lamp, and two side chairs.

Dining Room

The dining room had a large rug, and white walls above a black marble dado, and a black marble buffet along one long wall, a wall fountain, and three spherical chandeliers. The furniture was a lighter style the than other wooden furniture, in brown walnut, the chairs with a cross patterned back, and gold velvet upholstery. The table and most of the chairs were left in the apartment, but the collection includes one chair, and the carpet, a geometric design in shades of brown.

Items

The apartment was filled with objects by a number of designers, most purchased from the Werkstatte, but also from other designers.

Items listed in the gallery's collection includes at least 27 pieces:

Two silver fruit baskets, a silver vase and a silver cigarette box by Josef Hoffmann, as well four glass vases, a pair of goblets, a clock and two document folders, all from the Wiener Werkstatte.

The Wiener Keramik branch of the Werkstatte supplied a number of brightly coloured ceramic pieces, many designed by Michael Powolny, including three 'boxes' with decorative lids with figures or flowers, and a figurine, 'Dame mit Herz’, while the Wiener Kunstkeramische Werkstätte supplied two other figurines and a vase. Gmundner Keramik supplied a pair of fruit stands.

An early piece is a silver sweet basket, by Koloman Moser, dating from c1903.

There are at least four decorative tumblers, all from the Werkstatte, but by different designers, including one by Hoffman, one by Fritz Lowe, one by Felice Rix, and one by Fritzi Lowe.

== Gallery ==
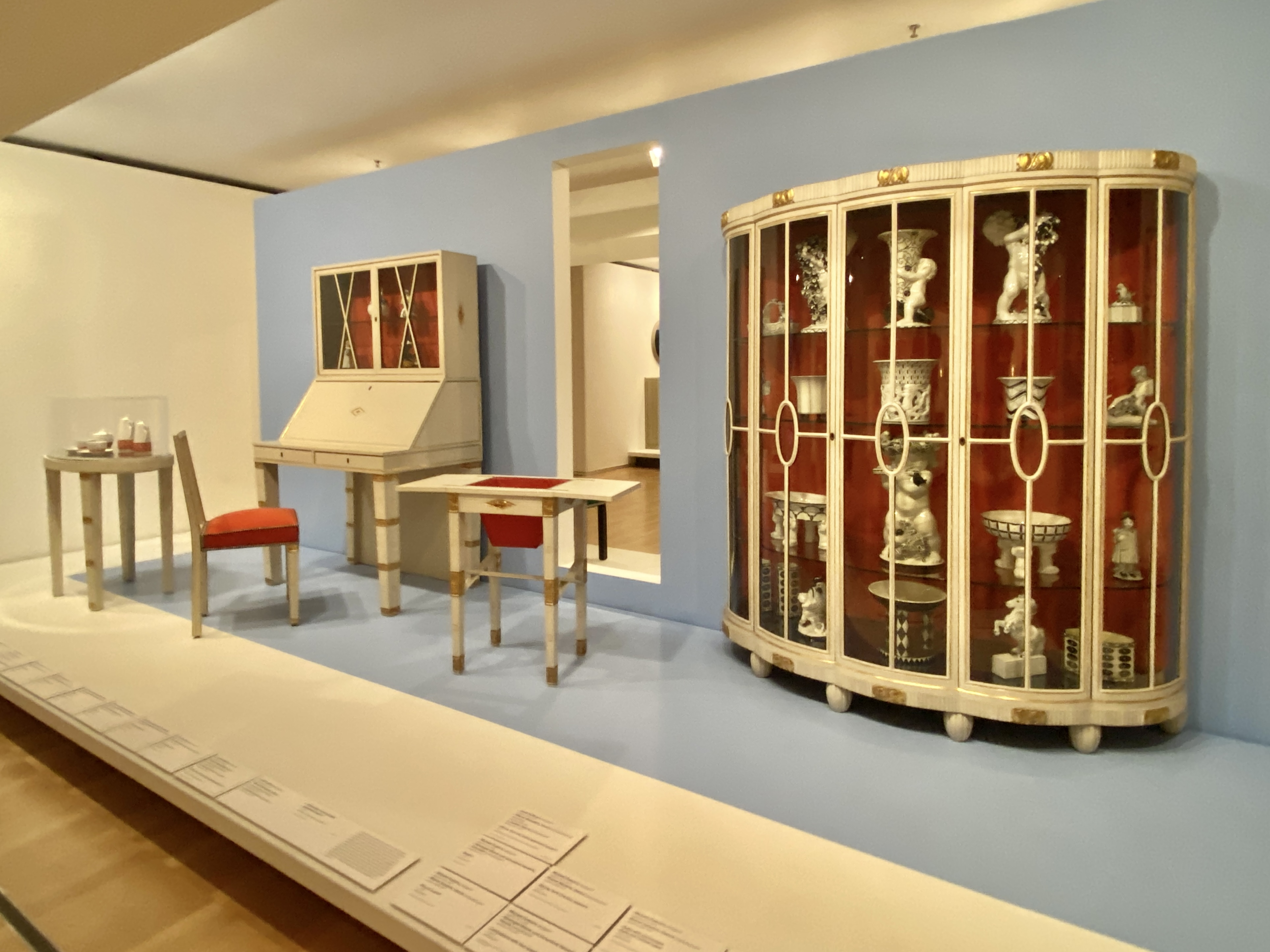
Boudoir furniture

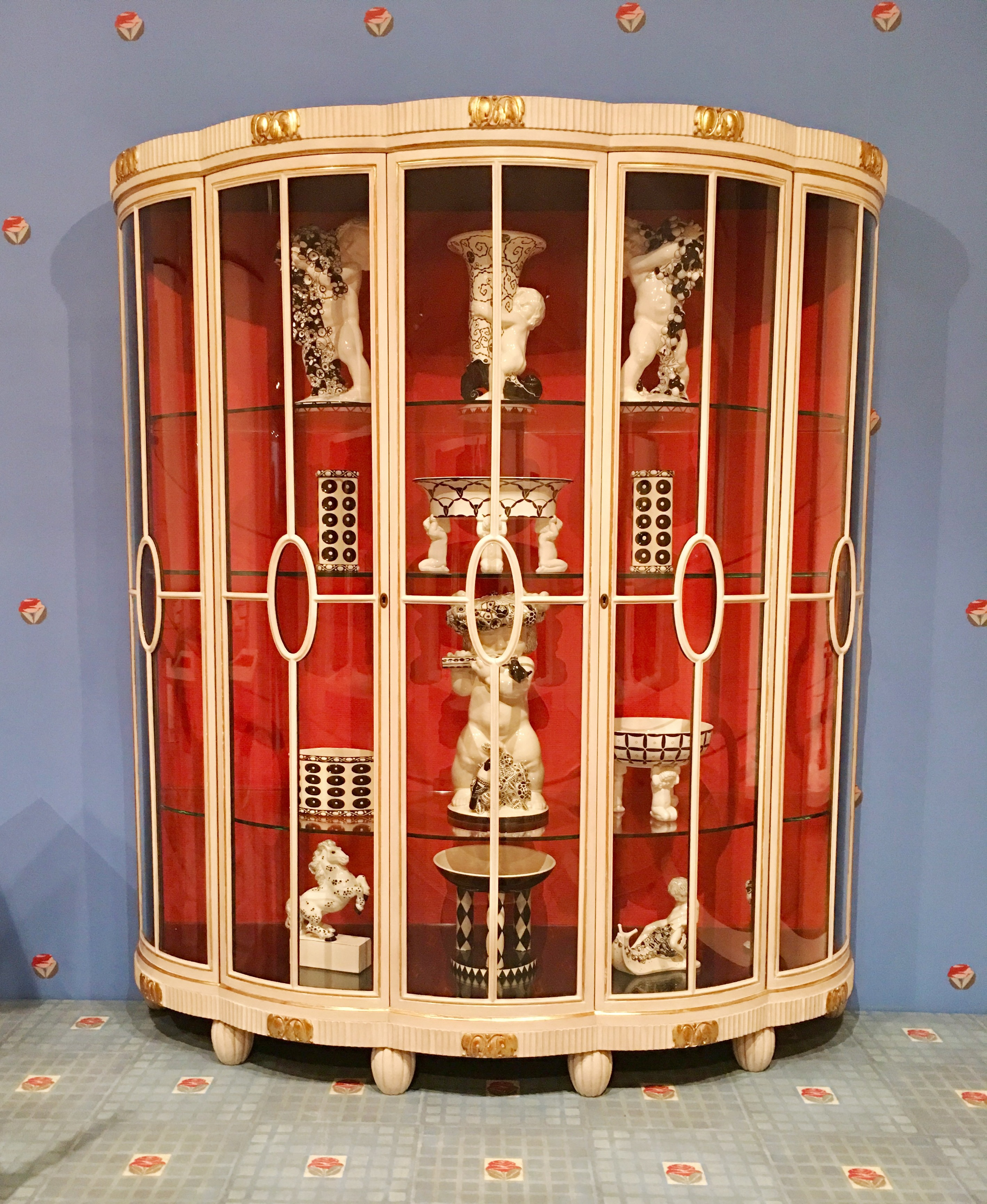
Boudoir vitrine (with contemporary Wiener Keramik pieces from the gallery's porcelain collection)

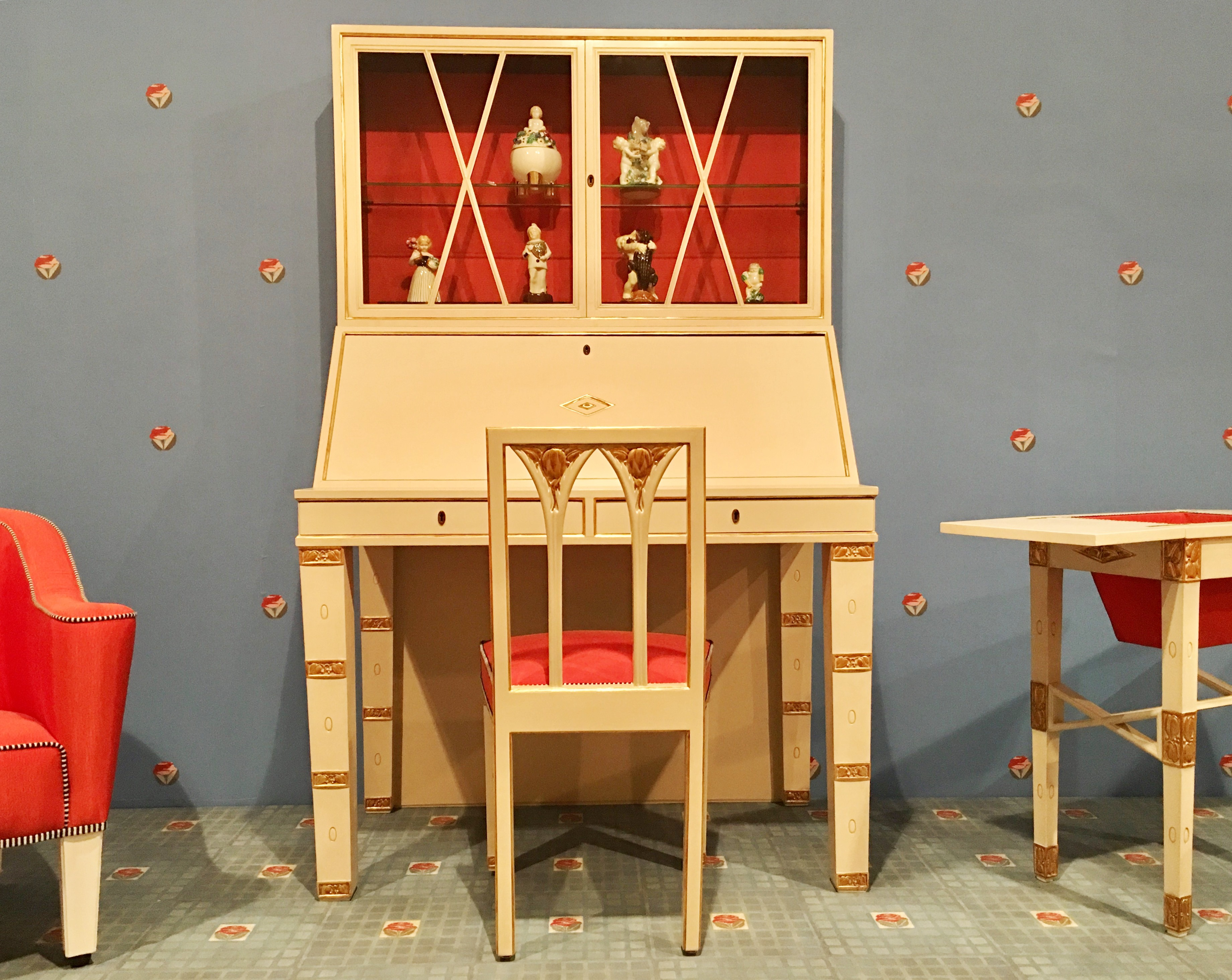
Boudoir - reproduction sofa chair, writing desk and chair and sewing table.

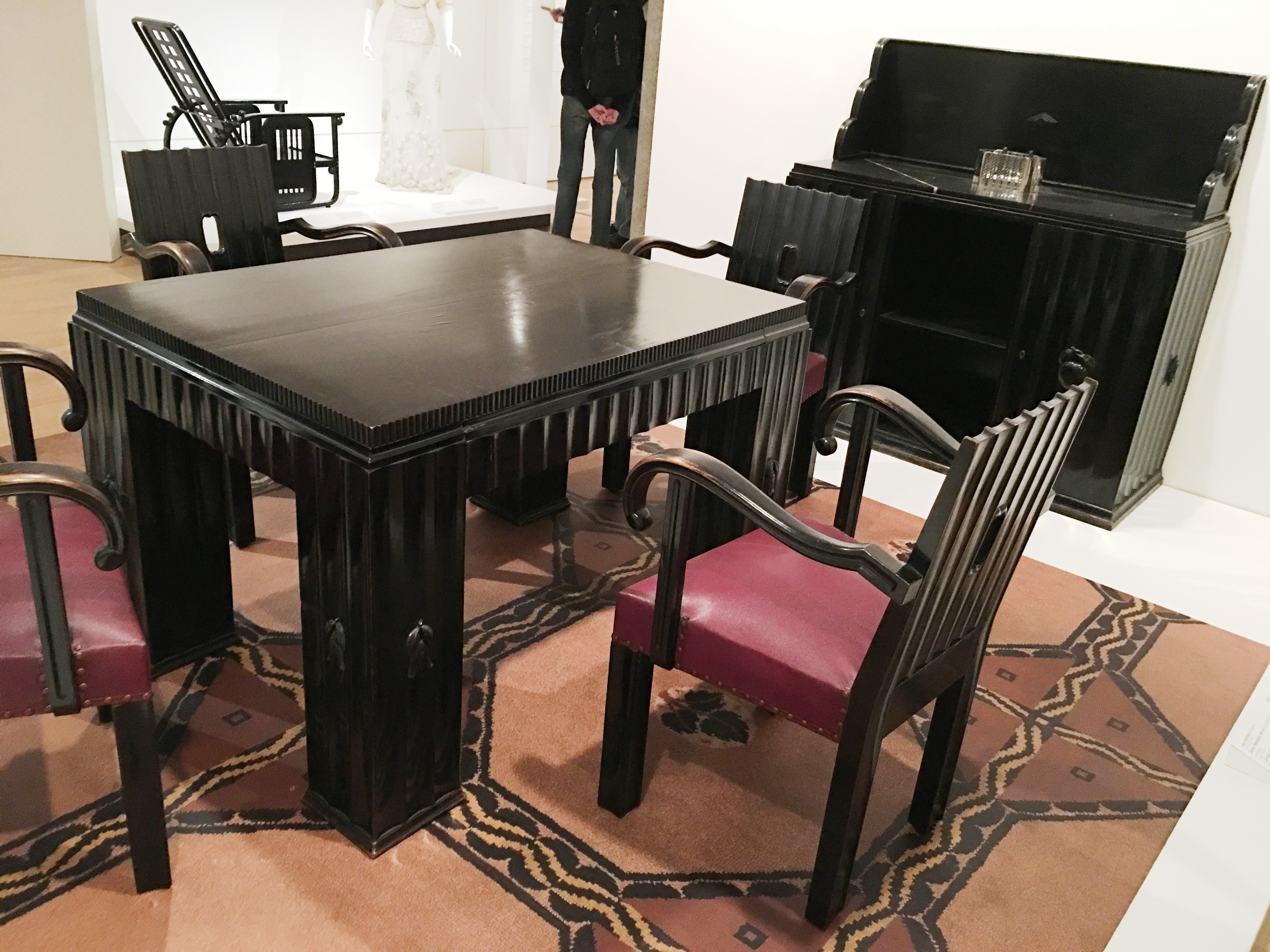
Hall sideboard, dining table and chairs, dining room carpet

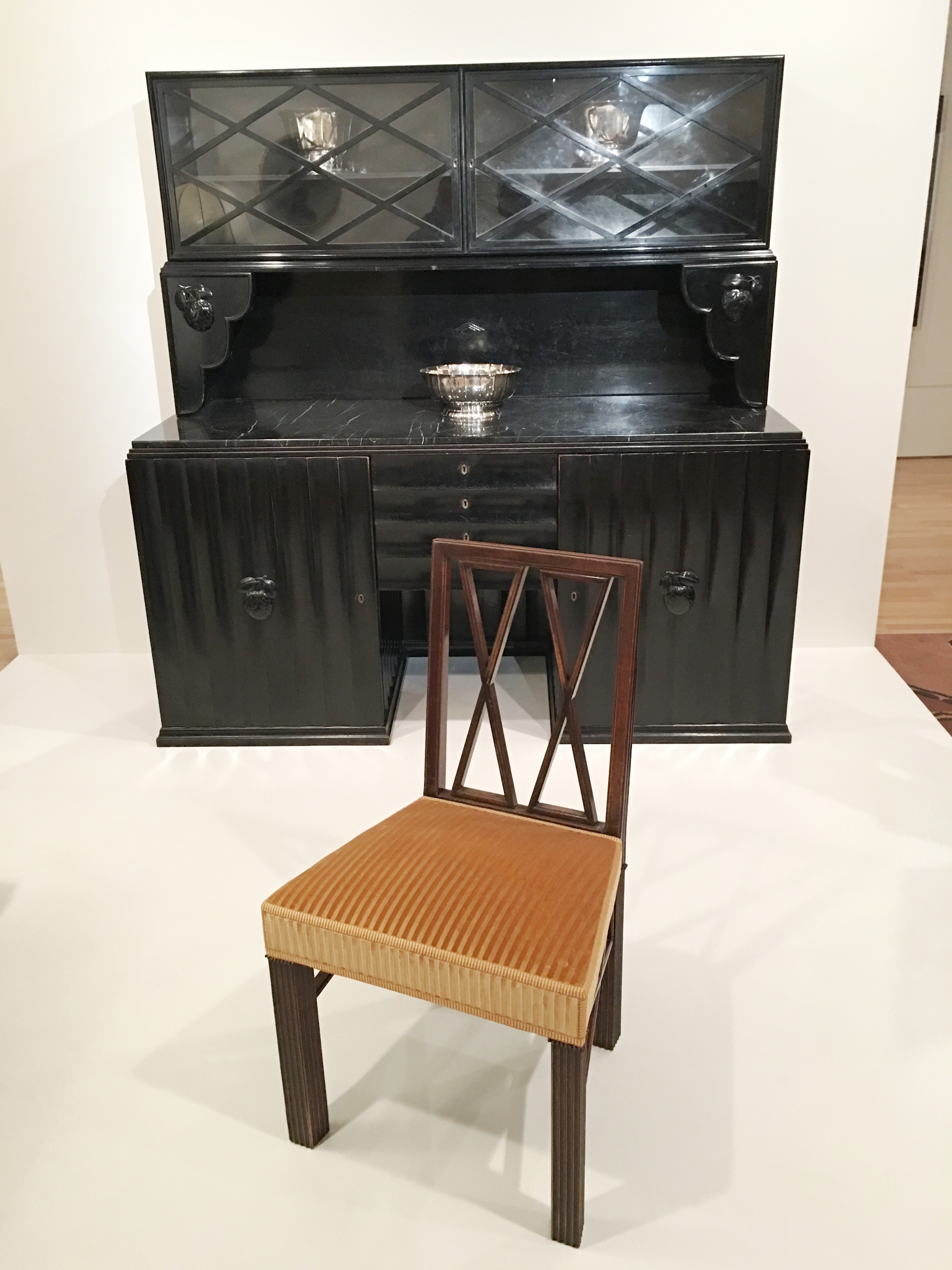
Second hall sideboard and dining room chair

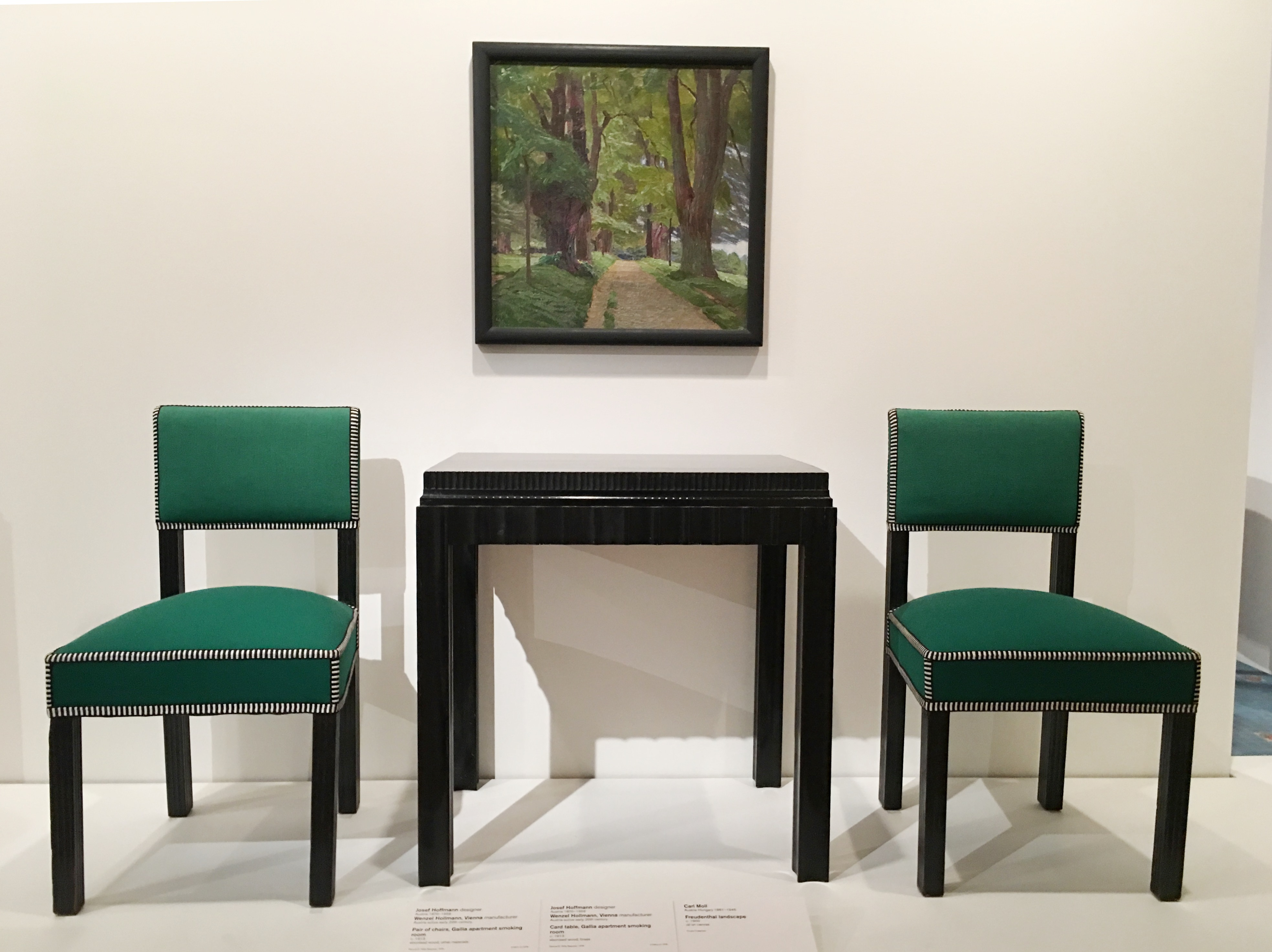
Smoking room side table and chairs

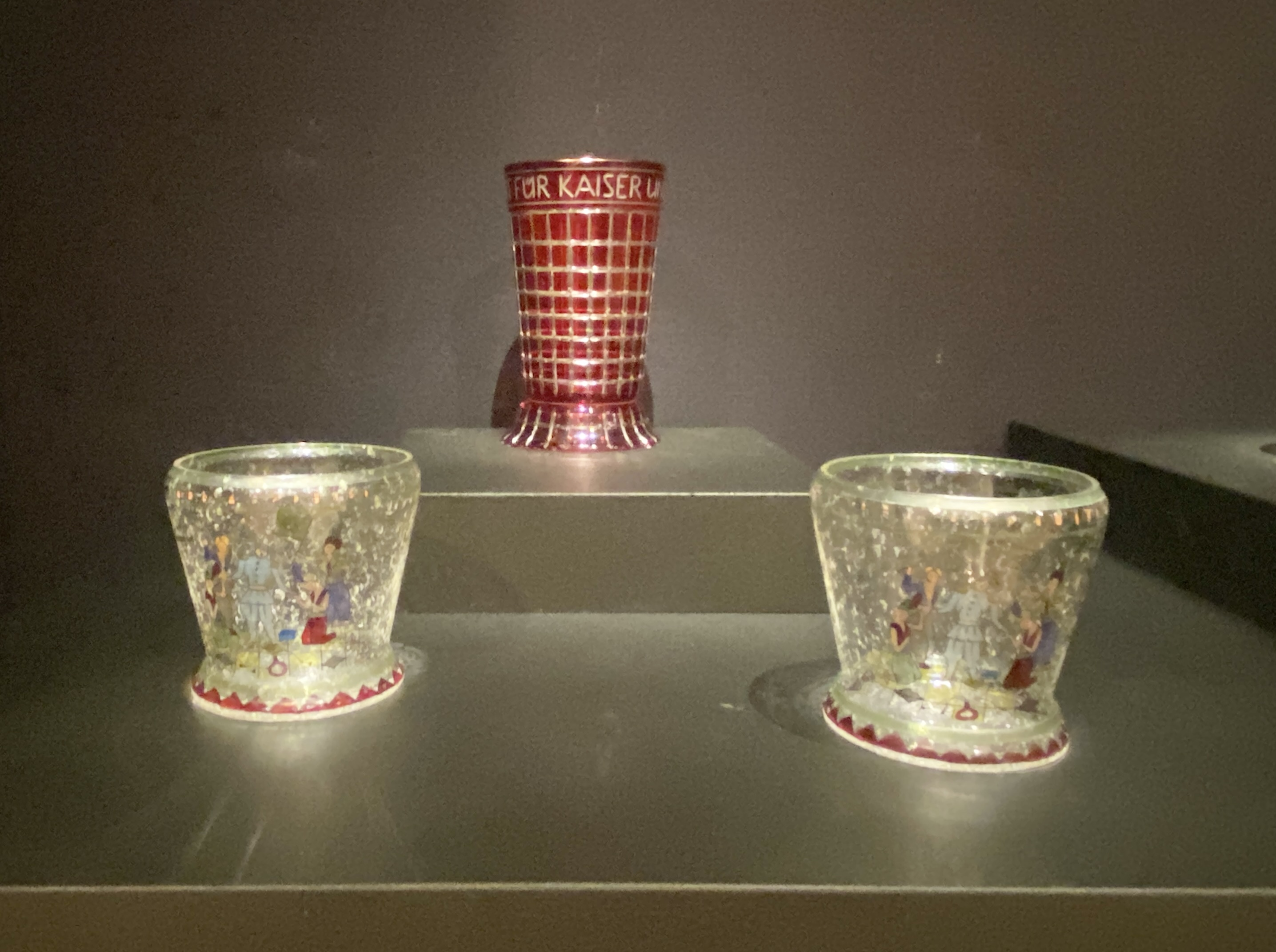
Tumblers c1916 by Ftitz Low for the Wiener Werstatte, and vase.

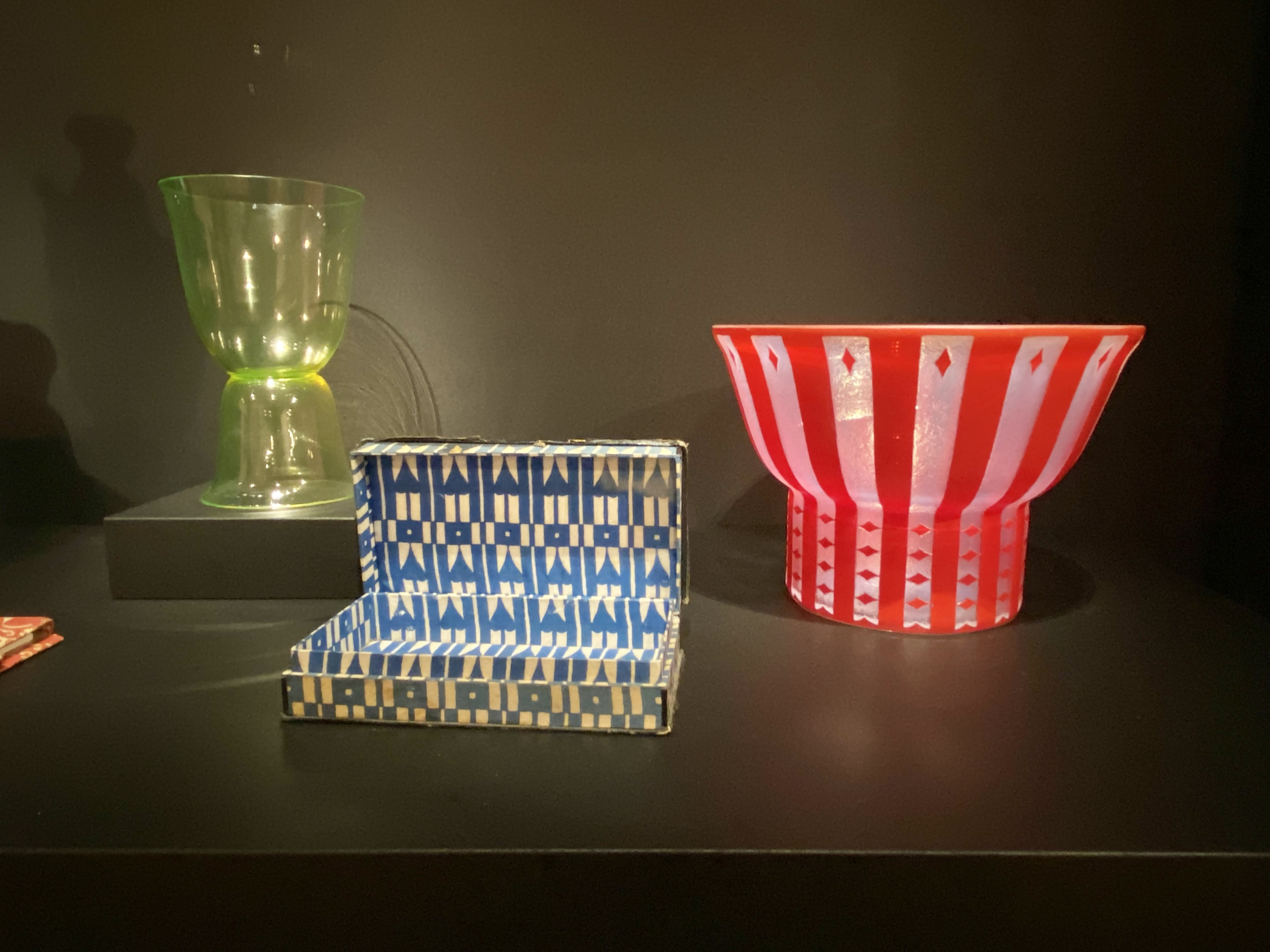
Vases, green one by Josef Hoffman, and box by Koloman Moser for the Wiener Werkstatte

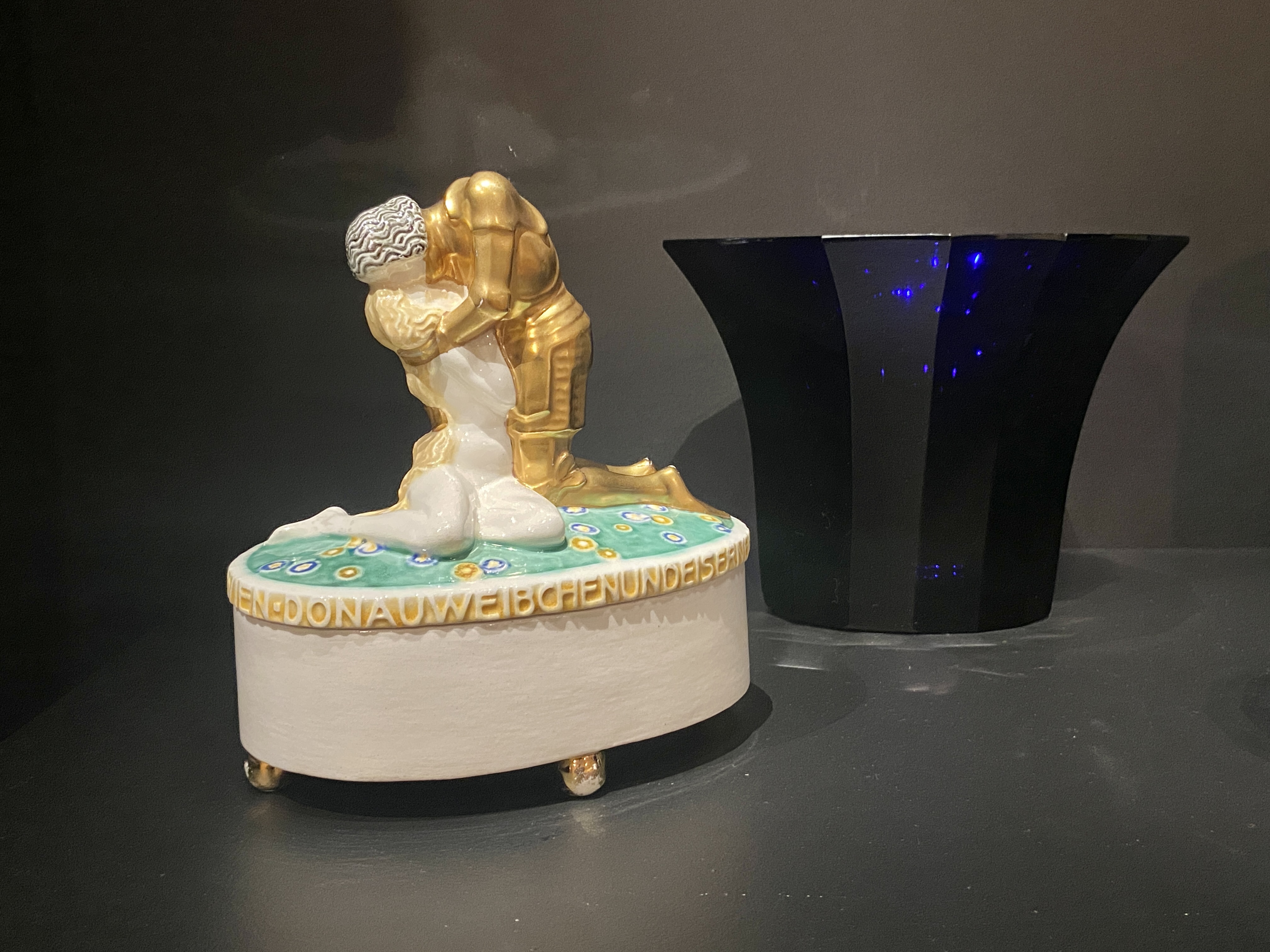
Covered box c1908 designed by Michael Powolny for Wiener Keramik, and vase c1916 by Josef Hoffman.
