= Galia Lahav =

Israeli fashion company

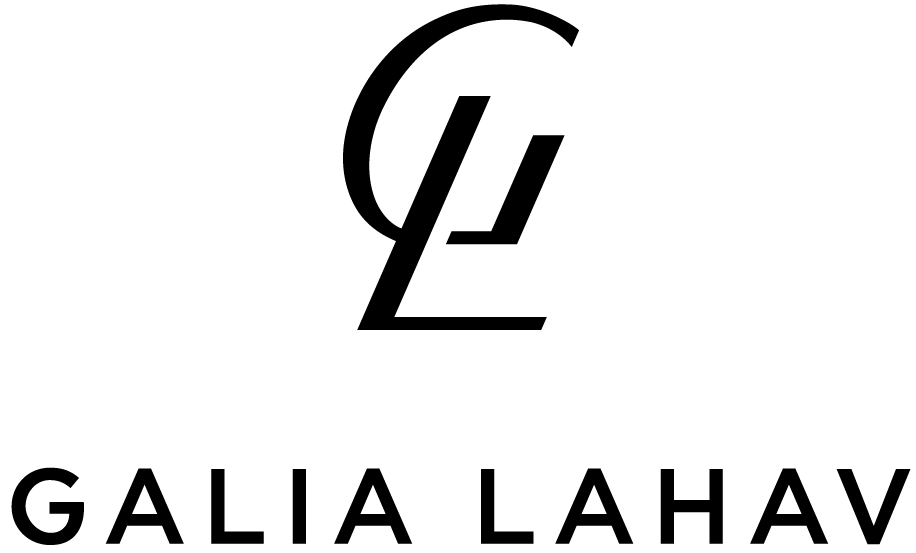
- Industry: Fashion
- Founder: Galia Lahav
- Headquarters: Tel Aviv, Israel
- Website: www.galialahav.com

Galia Lahav is a fashion label established in 1984 in Tel Aviv, Israel. It was founded by fashion designer Galia Lahav. The brand is primarily known for its bridal and evening wear. In January 2017, it became the first Israeli brand to be accepted by the Chambre Syndicale de la Haute Couture and to present in Paris Fashion Week. As of 2019, the brand is represented by 70 stores across 40 countries. Singer Beyoncé wore a Galia Lahav bridal gown to renew her vows.

== History ==
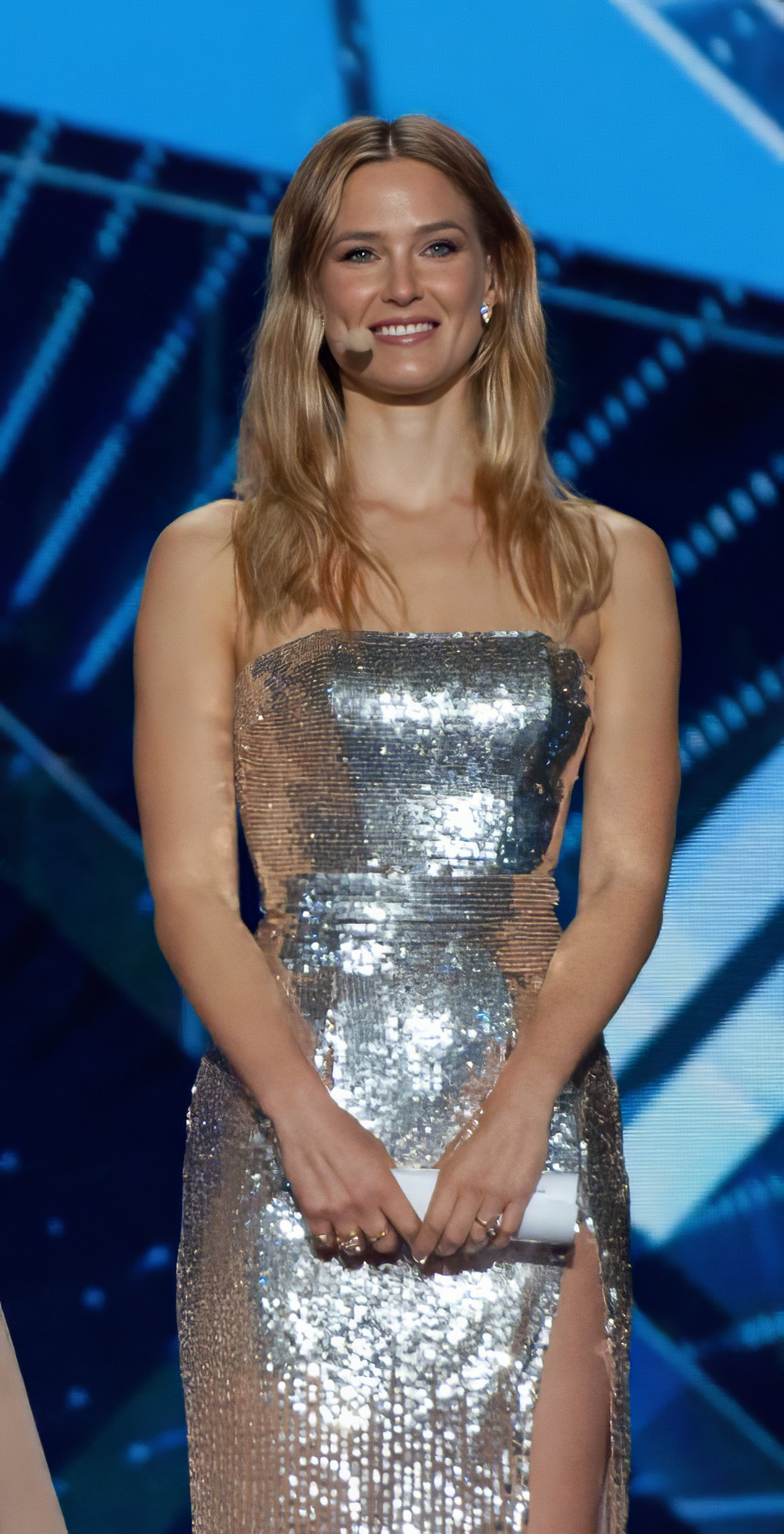
Bar Refaeli in Galia Lahav dress in Eurovision Song Contest 2019

Galia Lahav was born in Pinsk, Belarus in 1948. Lahav emigrated with her family to Israel in 1957, and grew up in southern Israel, in the city of Ashkelon. She taught crafts at a public school in Ashdod, until beginning to dedicate herself to a fashion business full-time at the age of 36, after giving birth to her youngest child. In 2005, after operating for more than 2 decades in the Israeli market, Galia's youngest son, Idan Lahav, had joined the company as the CEO and helped expand the company's operations to the international market. In a Forbes interview, Lahav shared how technology and data-driven approach has helped the brand penetrate the global arena, saying "[we] continues to look to the paradoxes of the connected consumer to guide its data-driven, creative-centric approach, forging innovative inroads deeper into the ever-expanding social worlds of the most demanding (and fashionable) of all connected consumers."

== Notable clients and projects ==
Galia Lahav dresses worn by

Name	Event
Priyanka Chopra	Chasing Happiness Premiere
Katy Perry	QVC x FFANY Gala
Jennifer Lopez	NBC's New Year's Eve
Ava DuVernay	Oscars After-Party
Michelle Keegan	2020 Brit Awards
Bar Refaeli	Eurovision
Christina Aguilera	The 'Mulan' World Premiere
Beyoncé	Vow Renewal
Christine Quinn	Wedding
Lais Ribeiro	amFAR
Tiffany Haddish	Golden Globes
Shanina Shaik	amfAR Hong Kong
Olivia Culpo	Miami Swim Week
Alesha Dixon	Britain's Got Talent
Paris Hilton	Wedding
Simone Biles	Wedding
Rita Ora	Harper's Bazaar
Vanessa Hudgens	Wedding
Khloe Kardashian	Kardashian Christmas Party 2023
Nadia Ferreira	Wedding to Marc Anthony
Jessica Szohr	Wedding to Brad Richardson
Nina Dobrev	Jessica Szohr's Wedding
Chrishell Stause	67th Grammy Awards
Serena Williams	2024 ESPYs Awards
Maura Higgins	2025 BRIT Awards
Millie Bobby Brown	Wedding to Jake Bongiovi
Simone Biles	"Simone Biles Rising: Part 2" Premiere
Lauren Sanchez	Bachelorette Party
Sydney Sweeney	Wedding of Lauren Sanchez Bezos and Jeff Bezos

As part of their FW26 collections, Galia Lahav released the "1 Million Dollar Wedding Gown" in collaboration with Leibish. The unique gown has a diamond and ruby encrusted broach featuring a 30 carat ruby.

== Flagship stores ==
Galia Lahav opened its first Flagship store in Tel Aviv, Israel. In 2016, Galia Lahav opened the doors to their Los Angeles flagship store located on La Brea.

In 2020, the brand opened another Flagship store in Miami, Florida, in 2022 they opened their New York City flagship store, and in 2024 they opened their London flagship. In 2025, the brand announced a significant expansion and renovation of their Los Angeles flagship store.
