= Galea (surname) =

Galea is a surname of Maltese origin. It is also common to parts of Spain and southern Italy. Notable people with the surname include:

- Aloisio Galea (1851–1905), Maltese theologian and minor philosopher
- Anthony Galea (born 1959), Canadian sports medicine specialist
- Ben Galea (born 1978), Australian professional rugby league footballer
- Carol Galea (born 1962), Maltese long-distance runner
- Ċensu Galea (born 1956), Maltese politician
- Cressida Galea (born 1996 or 1997), Maltese politician
- Danny Galea (born 1983), Australian rugby league player
- Emanuel Galea (1891–1974), Maltese Roman Catholic bishop and academic
- Graziella Galea, Maltese politician
- Guze Galea (1901–1978), Maltese doctor and author
- James Galea (born 1981), Australian magician and actor
- Lino Galea (born 1976), Maltese footballer
- Louis Galea (born 1948), Maltese representative on the European Court of Auditors
- Ludwig Galea, Maltese singer
- Michael Galea (footballer) (born 1979), Maltese footballer
- Noel Galea Bason (1955–2026), Maltese sculptor and medalist
- Paul Galea (born 1970), Australian rugby league player
- Robert Galea (born 1981), Maltese-Australian Roman Catholic priest and singer/songwriter
- Sandro Galea (born 1971), Maltese-American epidemiologist, public health leader and academic
- Stefan Galea (born 1996), Maltese singer
