= Salah Ali Al-Ghali =

Sudanese politician (died 2015)

Salah Ali Al-Ghali (died October 2015) was a Sudanese politician who served as the governor of South Darfur from 2001. During his term as governor over 50 people died in tribal clashes in May 2002. He was a member of the Sudanese National Legislature.

He died in October 2015 and was given a state funeral.
