= Ghalia bint Mohammed Al-Thani =

Qatari physician and civil servant

Sheikha Ghalia bint Mohammed bin Hamad Al-Thani (Arabic: غالية بنت محمد بن حمد آل ثاني) is a Qatari medical doctor and civil servant. She was Qatar's Minister of Public Health in 2008–2009.

== Life ==
Ghalia bint Mohammed Al-Thani qualified as a doctor from the University of Jordan in 1987, and went on to specialize in pediatrics in London. In 1992 she became a member of the Royal College of Physicians. She was the first woman to head the Children's Department at Hamad Hospital.

In 1998 she began working in the social sector, joining and later chairing the National Committee for Children with Special Needs. She was Qatar's representative to UNICEF, and in 2003 was appointed to Qatar's national committee on human rights. In 2005 she was appointed as head of the board of Qatar's National Health Authority.

On 1 July 2008 she was appointed Minister of Public Health in Qatar. On 28 April 2009 she was replaced by Abdullah bin Khalid Al Qahtani.

In 2008, Ghalia was also appointed Director of Hamad Medical Corporation (HMC).

Sheikha Ghalia is a member of the board of governors for Sidra Medical and Research Centre, and chairs its clinical steering planning committee.
