= Hamza Abu-Ghalia =

Libyan weightlifter (born 1980)

Personal information
- Nationality: Libyan
- Born: 10 December 1980 (age 45)
- Weight: 85 kg (187 lb)

Sport
- Sport: Weightlifting

Hamza Abu-Ghalia (born 10 December 1980) is a Libyan weightlifter. He competed in the 2004 Summer Olympics.
