= Gallia (Gounod) =

Composition by Charles Gounod

Gallia is an 1871 motet for soprano, chorus, orchestra, and organ by Charles Gounod. The text is a setting of Lamentations with alternative French text by Gounod.

It was written for the 1871 International Exhibition in London.

Composed by Gounod while in exile in London (due to the Franco-Prussian War), the cantata is dedicated to France—*Gallia* being the Latin word for France. In it, Gounod draws a profound parallel between the destroyed Jerusalem of the Lamentations of Jeremiah and a battered France.

In February 1944, Canon Joseph Besnier—choirmaster at Nantes Cathedral—was forbidden by the Nazi occupiers from performing this oratorio, which he had included in his schedule of sacred concerts .

== Recordings ==
- Gallia (Lamentation). Cecile Perrin (soprano), Chorus and Orchestra of Paris-Sorbonne, Jacques Grimbert, conductor. Marco Polo DDD8.223892 (1995)
