= Gallia County Courthouse =

Local government building in the United States

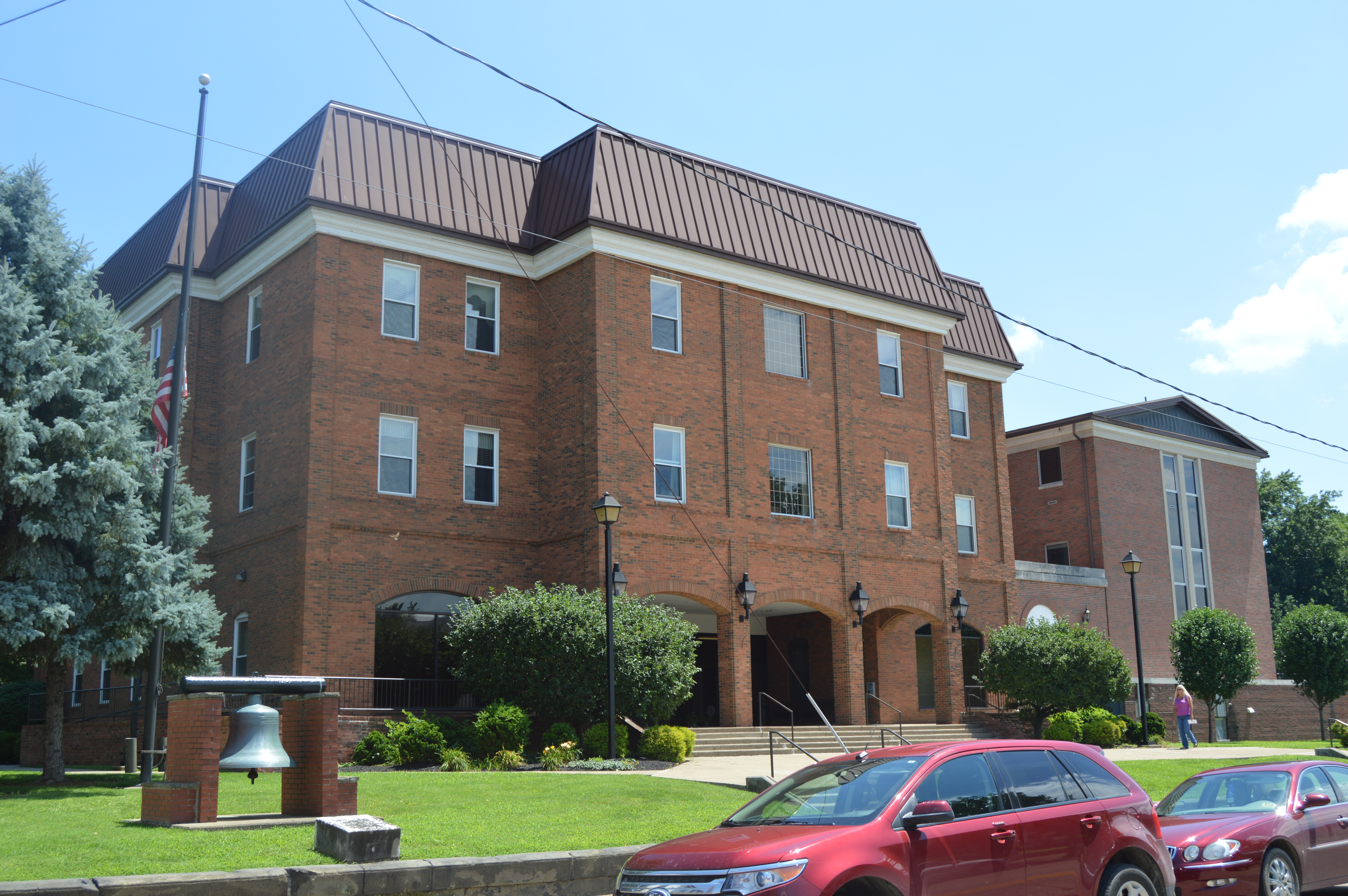
Front of the courthouse

The Gallia County Courthouse is located at 18 Locust Street in Gallipolis, Ohio, United States.

== History ==
Gallia County was established in 1803 from land that was once Washington County. The first settlers were French refugees fleeing from the terror of the French Revolution. When these refugees landed they discovered their land grants were worthless and were part of an overseas swindle. When these unfortunate victims thought all was lost, President Washington intervened and arranged for them to settle lands of the Ohio Company south of Marietta. These original settlers would be known as "the 500".

The "500" reached their new lands in October 1790, where they cleared the land and constructed 80 log cabins along a rectangular grid, which they named Gallipolis, which is translated as "City of the Gauls". The settlers petitioned successfully the Ohio General Assembly to grant them the status of being a county and construction of a courthouse began in 1806. This courthouse was placed on a sandstone foundation that ended two feet above ground, where the red brick structure began. The two-story building was rectangular in shape and was lined by large rectangular windows and a central door.

The building was completed in 1812, but was later torn down and replaced by a second courthouse. This second courthouse was burned down by an arsonist and was rebuilt in the same style, until it was again set on fire by arsonists. The courthouse was repaired again, but in a repeat of history, it caught fire again and was rebuilt to a fine example of the Italianate style. This building, the fourth courthouse, lasted until a 1981 fire. The present modernistic structure was completed in its stead four years later.
