= Gallia Préhistoire =

French archaeological journal

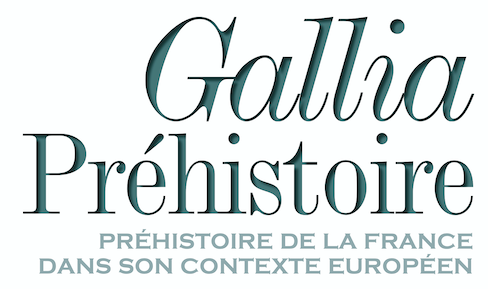
- Discipline: Archaeology
- Language: French
- Edited by: Thomas Perrin

Publication details
- History: 1958–present
- Publisher: CNRS Éditions (France)
- Frequency: Annual
- Open access: Yes

Standard abbreviations
- ISO 4: Gall. Préhist.

Indexing
- ISSN: 0016-4127 (print); 2109-9642 (web)
- OCLC no.: 551692418

Links
- Journal homepage; OpenEdition Journals (2015–present); Persée (1958–2014)

Gallia Préhistoire is a peer-reviewed journal of prehistoric archaeology, whose first issue was published in 1958. The journal covers all of prehistory, up to and including the Bronze Age, in France, as well as in neighboring territories.

== History ==
Gallia Préhistoire grew out of the journal Gallia. Founded in 1943, the scope of Gallia was subsequently redefined to include only the archaeology of Antiquity owing to the creation of Gallia Préhistoire in 1958. In 1995, Gallia Préhistoire was provided the sub-title Archéologie de la France préhistorique, which in turn would be replaced in 2008 with Préhistoire de la France dans son contexte européen.

== Publisher ==
The journal is housed within the editorial unit of the Maison des Sciences de l'homme Mondes, which was, prior to 2020, referred to as the Maison Archéologie & Ethnologie René-Ginouvès. Their offices are located on the campus of the Paris Nanterre University.

== Major themes ==
The journal deals with archaeological material from France, as well as neighboring cultures, dating to the Lower Paleolithic through to the end of the Bronze Age. It is published annually, and this cycle is complemented by the publication of supplemental material, entitled Suppléments à Gallia Préhistoire.

== Digitalization ==
Since 2016, new issues of Gallia Préhistoire are freely available on the OpenEdition Journals web portal. Volumes published from the journal's creation to 2014 are available on the Persée web portal, as are the journal's supplemental materials.

== Editorial administration ==
Since 1958, a total of seven researchers have been responsible for the editorial organization of the journal.

- 1958-1985: André Leroi-Gourhan
- 1985-1994: Jean Guilaine
- 1994-2008: Denis Vialou
- 2008-2011: Grégor Marchand
- 2011: Anne Bridault
- 2012-2015: Jean-Pierre Bracco
- Since 2015: Thomas Perrin
