= WDAO =

Dayton, Ohio; United States
- Broadcast area: Dayton metropolitan area
- Frequency: 1210 kHz
- Branding: Real Rhythm of the City

Programming
- Language: English
- Format: Urban adult contemporary

Ownership
- Owner: Johnson Communications, Inc.

History
- First air date: September 4, 1947
- Former call signs: WWSO (1947–1954); WAVI (1954–1985)
- Call sign meaning: "Dayton, Ohio"

Technical information
- Licensing authority: FCC
- Facility ID: 31880
- Class: D
- Power: 1,000 watts day
- Transmitter coordinates: 39°43′36″N 84°12′23″W
- Translator: 102.3 W272DR (Drexel)

Links
- Public license information: Public file; LMS
- Webcast: Listen Live
- Website: wdaoradio.com

WDAO (1210 AM) – branded Real Rhythm Of The City – is a commercial daytime-only urban adult contemporary radio station licensed to Dayton, Ohio. Owned by minority-owned business Johnson Communications, Inc., WDAO serves the Dayton metropolitan area.

Originally established in Springfield in 1947 as WWSO, the station relocated to Dayton in 1954 under the WAVI call sign—the fourth AM station to operate in Dayton proper. Along with a variety of formats ranging from big band to adult contemporary to country, WAVI became an early adopter of the talk radio format in 1971 and was one of the first radio homes for political commentator Mike Gallagher. Assuming the call letters and format of its former FM adjunct WDAO in 1985, it later became the first and only minority-owned radio station in Dayton in 1987, a distinction it holds to this day.

The WDAO studios are located in Dayton's Wright-Dunbar Historic District, while the transmitter also resides in Dayton. In addition to a standard analog transmission, WDAO is relayed over low-power Drexel FM translator W272DR (102.3 FM) and is available online.

== History ==
=== WWSO in Springfield ===
Radio Springfield, Inc., applied with the Federal Communications Commission (FCC) for a construction permit to build a new radio station in Springfield, Ohio, on July 15, 1946. After an amendment, the FCC granted a permit for 1210 kHz on February 14, 1947, and WWSO went on the air September 4 of that year. Ownership turned over twice in the station's early years, including a sale in 1949 to Bradley Kincaid and S. A. Cisler and a 1952 transfer to Kincaid alone.

=== Move to Dayton as WAVI ===
In 1954, Kincaid sold WWSO to a consortium headed by disc jockey Tommy Sutton, who had plied his trade at WING (1410 AM), and H. K. "Bud" Crowl, a state legislator from Dayton. The call letters were changed to WAVI that March, and in October, the FCC approved the station to move from Springfield to Dayton. The staff were retained, while new facilities were built on a plot of land at Heck and Cincinnati streets adjacent to Interstate 75 to bring the "Birthplace of Aviation" just its fourth radio station. Even before the building was complete, WAVI began operating from Dayton on February 28, 1955, broadcasting for a month from Sutton's basement. For most of the late 1950s and 1960s, it carried a big band "good music" format—with the exception of a 48-hour period in 1959, later revealed to be a stunt, when the station aired rock music: called "Black Tuesday" by listeners, the story made national headlines.

WAVI applied for and received a construction permit for a companion FM station in 1960. It took four years before WDAO (107.7 FM) began broadcasts in September 1964 as the first station in the region with an R&B format. The growing WAVI-WDAO operation expanded in 1967 into a facility designed with separate studios for the AM and FM sides and additional office space.

Over the years, WAVI earned a reputation for alternative programming. In 1965, it expanded its talk and news output significantly, joining the Mutual Broadcasting System and picking up Joe Pyne's syndicated show. Two years later, it jettisoned its big band "good music" sound for country, only to flip to adult contemporary in 1969. This in turn slowly evolved into a more talk-driven format until the station went all-talk on weekdays in 1971. The talk programming lasted for over a decade, sometimes paired with oldies music. From 1978 to 1982, Mike Gallagher—later of Fox News Channel and Salem Radio Networks—hosted a program on WAVI, from which he was fired for discussing the need for president Ronald Reagan to be "rehearsed" by his staff before press conferences, a topic that offended owner Crowl.

=== WDAO moves to AM ===
In late 1984, after three decades of owning WAVI, Crowl and the other stakeholders sold WAVI and WDAO to Stoner Broadcasting of Des Moines, Iowa, for $4 million. The transaction remained pending when, on January 26, 1985, Crowl died of a heart attack.

Stoner closed on the purchase on March 1, 1985, and rumors of major changes at the AM-FM pair quickly escalated ahead of the handover. The final hour of WAVI's talk programming on February 28, 1985, was characterized by Dayton Daily News columnist Dale Huffman as "a wake on the airwaves". Simultaneously, Stoner moved WDAO to the AM frequency—naming the first Black station manager in its 21-year history, Jim Johnson—and relaunched the FM as WWSN "Sunny 107.7" with an adult contemporary format.

In 1987, Stoner sold WDAO to Johnson Communications, headed by station manager Johnson, making it the first Black-owned radio station in Dayton and just the fourth in all of Ohio. The station moved into the Westown Shopping Center and broadcast from there for a decade before relocating to a rehabilitated building in the Wright-Dunbar district in 1998.

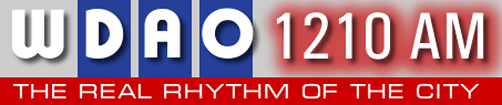
Former logo before translator sign on

In 2014, the daytime-only WDAO added local evening and overnight programming via the internet when the station commenced online streaming from its website. This programming made its way to terrestrial radio in December 2016, when WDAO signed on FM translator W272DR (102.3 FM), licensed to Drexel.
