= Ohio State Route 735 =

State highway in Gallia County, Ohio, US

State Route 735

Route information
- Maintained by ODOT
- Length: 1.23 mi (1.98 km)
- Existed: 1969–present

Major junctions
- West end: US 35 near Gallipolis
- East end: SR 7 near Gallipolis

Location
- Country: United States
- State: Ohio
- Counties: Gallia

Highway system
- Ohio State Highway System; Interstate; US; State; Scenic
← SR 734	→ SR 736

State Route 735 (SR 735) is a short east–west state highway in southeastern Ohio, located just northeast of the county seat of Gallia County, Gallipolis. The highway runs just under 1.25 miles (2.01 km) in length between its western terminus at a partial interchange with U.S. Route 35 (US 35) and its eastern terminus at a signalized T-intersection with SR 7. The route serves solely as a connector from eastbound US 35 to SR 7, and from SR 7 to westbound US 35. An interchange between these two end routes exists nearby, but only allows access from westbound US 35 to SR 7, and from SR 7 to eastbound US 35. SR 735 is a former alignment of US 35 when it traveled on the Silver Bridge to cross the Ohio River to Point Pleasant, West Virginia.

== Route description ==
The short journey of the four-lane divided SR 735, which exists entirely within Gallia County begins at an expansive partial interchange with the US 35 freeway that begins in Gallipolis Township and crosses into Addison Township. The highway, which does not have any driveways for its entire length, proceeds northeasterly past an intersection with Township Road 207, before bending to the east as it enters into its endpoint at a signalized T-intersection with SR 7 approximately three miles (4.8 km) northeast of downtown Gallipolis.

Although both US 35 and SR 7 through this area are a part of the National Highway System, SR 735 itself is not.

== History ==
SR 735 is a former alignment of US 35, constructed in 1967 as part of US 35's Gallipolis bypass. The original eastern end of the bypass at SR 7 was originally a four-leg intersection, with the fourth leg being formed by the Silver Bridge over the Ohio River to Point Pleasant, West Virginia.

The Silver Bridge collapsed on December 15, 1967 as the result of previously unknown metal fatigue. 46 people died in the collapse. A replacement span, the Silver Memorial Bridge, was built about 4,300 feet (1.3 km) downstream and opened on December 15, 1969. A new section of freeway was built to connect the new bridge to the Gallipolis bypass, leaving behind 1.23 miles (1.98 km) of recently built divided highway. This highway became SR 735 in 1969; the route has not experienced any changes since its designation.

== Major intersections ==
The entire route is in Gallia County.

Location	mi	km	Destinations	Notes
Gallipolis Township	0.00– 0.41	0.00– 0.66	US 35 west – Jackson, Chillicothe	Eastbound US 35 / westbound US 35 entrance only
Addison Township	1.23	1.98	SR 7 – Gallipolis, Pomeroy	
1.000 mi = 1.609 km; 1.000 km = 0.621 mi: Incomplete access
