= South Centre =

South Centre or South Center may refer to:

- South Center, Indiana, unincorporated town in Union Township, LaPorte County, Indiana, United States
- South Centre Township, Pennsylvania, township in Columbia County, Pennsylvania, United States
- South Centre (organization), intergovernmental organization of developing countries
- Southcentre Mall, Calgary, Alberta, Canada
