= Kanauga, Ohio =

- Census-designated place
- Location within Ohio Location within the United States
- Coordinates: 38°50′28″N 82°08′58″W
- Country: United States
- State: Ohio
- County: Gallia
- Townships: Gallipolis, Addison

Area
  - Total: 0.32 sq mi (0.83 km^{2})
  - Land: 0.29 sq mi (0.75 km^{2})
  - Water: 0.031 sq mi (0.08 km^{2})
- Elevation: 571 ft (174 m)

Population (2020)
  - Total: 185
  - Density: 639.1/sq mi (246.77/km^{2})
- Time zone: UTC-5 (Eastern (EST))
  - Summer (DST): UTC-4 (EDT)
- FIPS code: 39-39564
- GNIS feature ID: 2628907

Kanauga is an unincorporated community and census-designated place (CDP) in Gallia County, Ohio, United States. As of the 2020 census it had a population of 185.

== History ==
A post office called Kanauga was established in 1896, and remained in operation until it was discontinued in the 1960s. The origin of the name Kanauga is obscure.

== Geography ==
Kanauga is located in eastern Gallia County, primarily in the northeast corner of Gallipolis Township, but extending north into the southeast corner of Addison Township. It is bordered to the south by the city of Gallipolis and to the east by the Ohio River, which forms the Ohio–West Virginia border. Directly across the river is the city of Point Pleasant, West Virginia, and the mouth of the Kanawha River.

U.S. Route 35 passes through the southern part of the Kanauga CDP, leading east across the Ohio on the Silver Memorial Bridge. US-35 leads southeast 37 miles (60 km) to its terminus in Teays Valley, West Virginia, and northwest 62 miles (100 km) to Chillicothe. Ohio Route 7 passes through the center of Kanauga, leading northeast 52 miles (84 km) to Parkersburg, West Virginia, and southwest 4 miles (6 km) to the center of Gallipolis. Huntington, West Virginia, is 43 miles (69 km) to the southwest via Route 7.

According to the U.S. Census Bureau, the Kanauga CDP has a total area of 0.32 square miles (0.83 km^{2}), of which 0.29 square miles (0.75 km^{2}) is land and 0.03 square miles (0.08 km^{2}), or 9.76%, is water, consisting of the western side of the Ohio River.

== Demographics ==
Historical population
Census	Pop.	Note	%±
2020	185		—
U.S. Decennial Census
