= Ohio State Route 835 =

State highway in Montgomery and Greene counties in Ohio, US

State Route 835

Route information
- Maintained by ODOT
- Length: 6.586 mi (10.599 km)
- Existed: 1987–present

Major junctions
- West end: US 35 in Riverside
- East end: US 35 in Beavercreek

Location
- Country: United States
- State: Ohio
- Counties: Montgomery; Greene

Highway system
- Ohio State Highway System; Interstate; US; State; Scenic
| ← SR 833 | → SR 844 |

State Route 835 (SR 835) is an east–west state highway in Montgomery and Greene counties in Ohio, United States.

== Route description ==
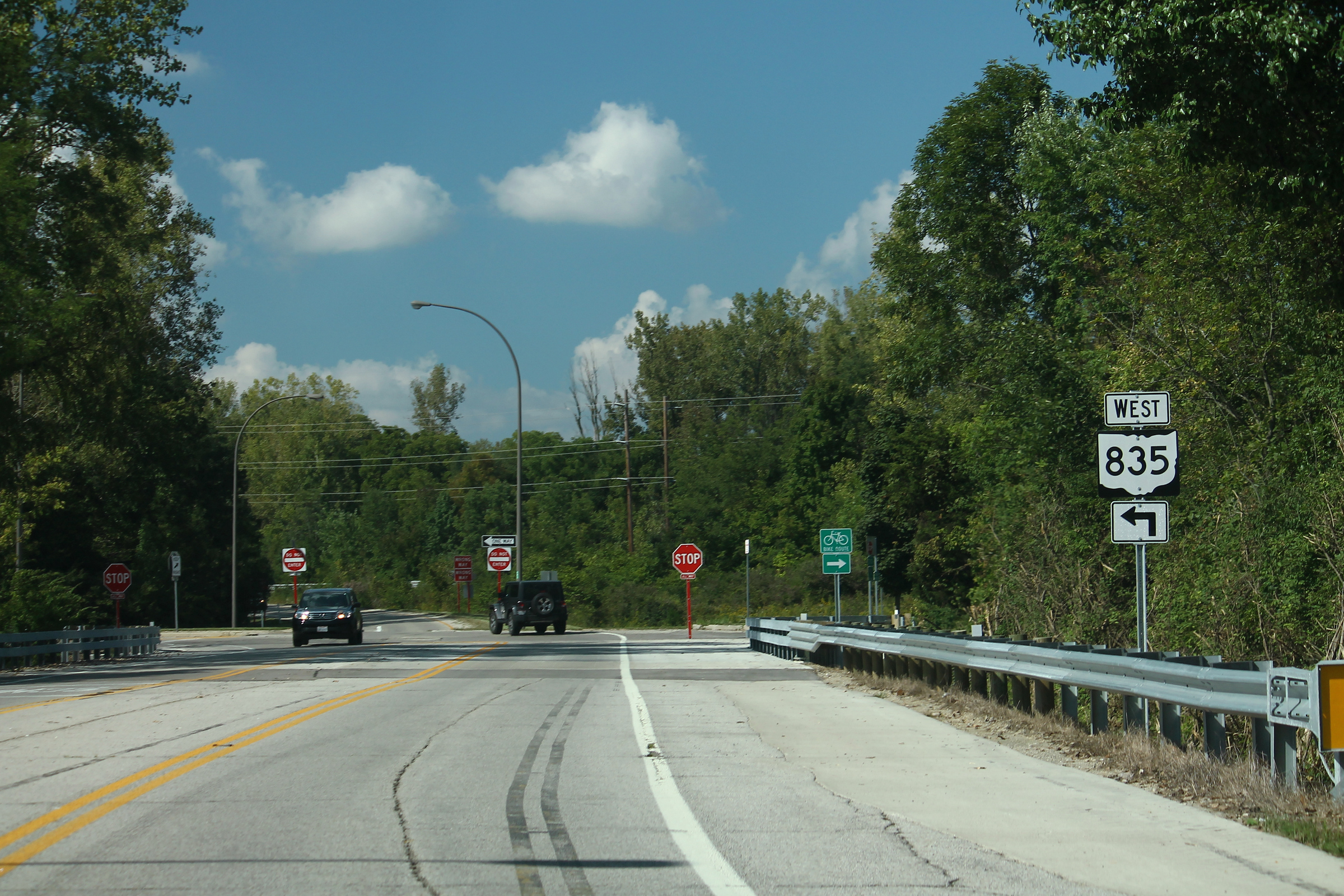
SR 835 (Research Boulevard) in Beavercreek, September 2018

State Route 835 connects to U.S. Route 35 (US 35) on both ends, starting at that route's interchange with Woodman Drive (C-74) in Riverside, approximately 4 1/2 miles (7.2 km) east of downtown Dayton. From there, the route occupies a portion of Woodman Drive for about 1.5 miles (2.4 km), crossing south through Dayton to an intersection with Patterson Road/Research Boulevard in Kettering; the route turns east onto Research Boulevard. After about a mile (1.6 km), the route reaches an intersection with County Line Road at the Kettering/Beavercreek border; while the roadway continues as Shakertown Road, and County Line Road approaches from the south, both the route and Research Boulevard turn to the north. From there the route gradually curves to the east, entering Beavercreek and passing under Interstate 675 with no junction. The route then reaches an intersection with an exit ramp from eastbound US 35; at that point, SR 835 turns south. Curving to the east, the route crosses US 35 on an overpass, then curves again to parallel US 35. SR 835 briefly continues to its terminus at the US 35 interchange with North Fairfield Road (C-9) in Beavercreek. Just prior to the terminus, the eastbound route has a right-turn lane that makes a U-turn-type movement, merging with the ramp from North Fairfield Road to westbound US 35. SR 835 does not intersect with any other state highways.

== Major intersections ==
| County | Location | mi | km | Destinations | Notes |
|---|---|---|---|---|---|
| Montgomery | Riverside | 0.00– 0.08 | 0.00– 0.13 | US 35 | Western terminus, diamond interchange |
| Greene | Beavercreek | 5.919– 6.586 | 9.526– 10.599 | US 35 | Eastern terminus, interchange |
1.000 mi = 1.609 km; 1.000 km = 0.621 mi
