= U.S. Route 35 =

Highway in the United States

U.S. Route 35
- US 35 in red, US 35 Bus. in blue

Route information
- Length: 417.73 mi (Note: Total mileage is the sum of the state mileages.) (672.27 km)

Major junctions
- South end: I-64 / CR 33 in Teays Valley, WV
- SR 32 / SR 124 in Jackson, OH; US 23 in Chillicothe, OH; I-71 near Jeffersonville, OH; I-675 in Beavercreek, OH; I-75 / SR 4 in Dayton, OH; I-70 near Richmond, IN; I-69 near Marion, IN
- North end: US 20 near Michigan City, IN

Location
- Country: United States
- States: West Virginia, Ohio, Indiana
- Counties: WV: Putnam, Mason; OH: Gallia, Jackson, Ross, Fayette, Greene, Montgomery, Preble; IN: Wayne, Randolph, Henry, Delaware, Grant, Howard, Cass, Pulaski, Starke, LaPorte

Highway system
- United States Numbered Highway System; List; Special; Divided
← US 34	US	→ US 36
← WV 34	WV	→ WV 36
← SR 34	OH	→ SR 35
← US 33	IN	→ US 36

U.S. Route 35 (US 35) is a United States Highway that runs southeast–northwest for approximately 412 miles (663 km) from the western suburbs of Charleston, West Virginia to northern Indiana. Although the highway is physically southeast–northwest, it is nominally north–south in West Virginia and Indiana and east–west in Ohio. The highway's southern terminus is in Teays Valley, West Virginia, near Scott Depot, at Interstate 64 (I-64). Its northern terminus is near Michigan City, Indiana, at US 20. The West Virginia portion of the highway is mostly expressway, becoming a freeway shortly before it crosses the Ohio River into Ohio. The Ohio portion has been upgraded to a four-lane highway/freeway between the West Virginia state line and Trotwood, west of Dayton.

== Route description ==
US 35 is signed north–south in West Virginia and Indiana, while in Ohio it is signed east–west.

=== West Virginia ===
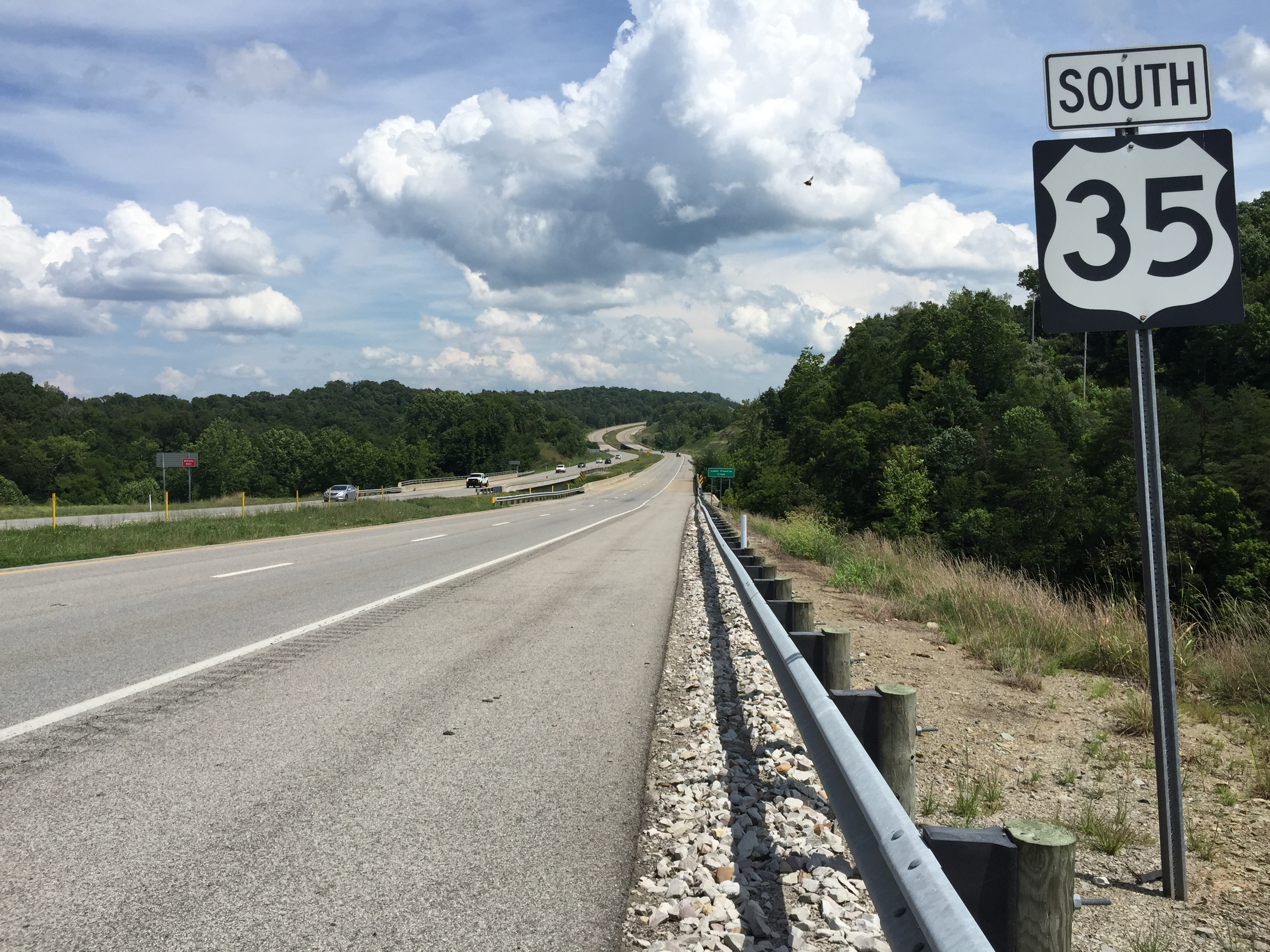
View south along US 35 at CR 3/6 near Couch, West Virginia

As of November 11, 2021, the final West Virginia portion of the highway has been expanded to four lanes, mostly along a completely new route.

In Putnam County, the roadway that becomes US 35 is a short, four-lane, divided, unsigned US 35 Spur running northward from Teays Valley Road toward I-64 on the edge of Scott Depot in Teays Valley. Remaining on the edge of Scott Depot, and now at the edge of Teays Valley, the roadway reaches US 35's southern terminus at its junction with I-64, where the route becomes an expressway.

US 35's junction with I-64 is a hybrid semi-directional T/diamond interchange. All movements between US 35 and I-64 are free-flowing, except for eastbound I-64 to northbound US 35. The interchange also handles movements between I-64 and the US 35 spur similar to a diamond interchange.

Proceeding north from I-64, US 35 has two intersections, followed by an interchange with West Virginia Route 34 (WV 34). There follow a number of intersections along the route, with one being an indirect connection to WV 817, the former path of US 35. The next major junction is WV 869, which travels across the Kanawha River on the Lower Buffalo Bridge (often referred to as the "Buffalo Bridge"), connecting via WV 62 to the town of Buffalo and the nearby, large Toyota engine and transmission plant. The route continues as an expressway.

At WV 2, which leads to Point Pleasant, there is a partial cloverleaf interchange with six ramps; all movements are free-flowing except for northbound US 35 to southbound WV 2, and from southbound WV 2 to southbound US 35; the interchange is partially in Henderson. At this point, US 35 becomes a freeway and remains so, as it immediately crosses the Ohio River on the Silver Memorial Bridge, and enters Ohio.

=== Ohio ===
US 35 is signed east–west in Ohio, an exception to the numbering scheme for US Highways, which calls for odd-numbered routes to be signed north–south, as is US 35 in West Virginia and Indiana.

Continuing as a freeway, US 35 crosses the Ohio River from West Virginia on the Silver Memorial Bridge, and enters Gallia County, Ohio. The first, partial interchange, providing a westbound exit and an eastbound entrance, is with State Route 7 (SR 7), just outside the village of Gallipolis. Just after that, still, outside the village, the highway passes adjacent to the Gallia–Meigs Regional Airport within Gallipolis; there is another partial interchange, providing an eastbound left exit and a westbound left entrance to SR 735, which connects to SR 7.

From there, US 35 continues west, where there is a hybrid interchange with an unusual configuration at SR 160. SR 160 roughly parallels US 35 to the south; there is a westbound exit to SR 160 north which uses a flyunder ramp, an eastbound entrance from SR 160 south, and an eastbound entrance from SR 160 north. Additionally, another fly under ramp from SR 160 north merges with the westbound exit ramp; that exit ramp, in turn, splits to form an entrance ramp to westbound US 35. This interchange lacks an eastbound exit. As SR 160 turns north, it diverges from US 35, which travels somewhat northwest. There, US 35 once again meets SR 160, this time at a partial interchange with an eastbound exit and a westbound loop ramp entrance.

Turning more west-northwest, there is an interchange at SR 850 (Rodney Pike), followed by a rest area in each direction. Approaching the edge of Rio Grande, the route turns west and then west-southwest, where there is an interchange at SR 325.

Past the village, the highway travels northwest and becomes a four-lane, at-grade expressway when it reaches the Gallia County village of Centerville; here there is an intersection with SR 279 west.

Traveling north-northwest and northwest into Jackson County, the expressway configuration continues until SR 327, where there is a grade-separated, one-quadrant interchange, with the connecting road in the southeast quadrant of the junction. The road resumes as an at-grade expressway, approaching and then skirting the edge of Jackson.

The route then reaches a grade-separated, right-in/right-out interchange; westbound there is a right-in/right-out at Keystone Furnace Road; eastbound there is a right-in/right-out at McCarty Lane; these roads are connected via Industry Drive and Acy Avenue, which overpasses US 35.

Next, there is an unusual interchange configuration at SR 32/SR 124, which is an expressway in both directions. Each highway has ramps that exit to the other highway, with right-turning traffic merging onto the second highway, but left-turning traffic coming to an at-grade intersection. Both highways end up having at-grade intersections, albeit with grade separation of the main highway corridors. This interchange type is sometimes termed a "windmill" interchange, but it is not related to the interchange type of the same name. This junction is the only interchange of its type known to exist in the world.

Soon after passing the last interchange and still skirting Jackson, the highway once again becomes a freeway and has an interchange at Pattonsville Road/Broadway Street. Turning briefly north, then northwest, the route leaves Jackson and reaches an interchange with SR 93. It next has an interchange with Jackson County Road 84 (Chillicothe Pike).

After the last interchange, the highway becomes an at-grade expressway for about 12 miles (19 km). Along this section, there is a rest area next to the westbound lanes but accessible from both directions, with additional access via Cain Road (Jackson Township Road 213).

US 35 then turns roughly west, entering Ross County and reaching an interchange with Vigo Road/Watson Road at Richmond Dale. At this point the route again becomes a freeway. Turning north and northwest, the section between Richmond Dale and Chillicothe includes a large cut through a 1,000-foot (300 m) ridge and provides westbound motorists with a panoramic view of the Scioto River valley.

Southeast of Chillicothe, westbound US 50 joins US 35 in a concurrency at a hybrid interchange; similar to a diamond interchange, the exit ramp from US 35 east carrying US 50 east becomes a two-way road, curves around and crosses over US 35 about 1/2 mile (0.80 km) east; the other ramps connect to this overpass. Next, US 50 west leaves the concurrency at a partial interchange at Eastern Avenue; there is only a westbound exit and an eastbound entrance. Then, the US 23 north freeway joins US 35 in a concurrency at a partial-Y interchange; there is an eastbound exit and a westbound left entrance.

Turning north-northwest, US 35 skirts Chillicothe to the east, coming to an interchange at Main Street. Turning northwest, the US 23 north freeway leaves the concurrency at a partial-Y interchange; there is a westbound exit and an eastbound left entrance.

Turning west and skirting through city boundaries, there is a partial cloverleaf interchange with five ramps at SR 159 (Bridge Street); there is a loop ramp from northbound Bridge Street and a directional ramp from southbound Bridge Street to westbound US 35. Travelers eastbound near this interchange can see the hills that are shown on the Great Seal of the State of Ohio.

Turning northwest, just outside the city limits, there is an interchange at SR 104 (High Street). The next, partial interchange, is at Pleasant Valley Road/Egypt Pike with a westbound exit and an eastbound entrance (via Larrick Lane). Continuing along, there is an interchange at Ross County Road 550/Pleasant Valley; despite this junction being a regular service interchange, it is configured as a hybrid trumpet interchange. Next is an interchange at Ross County Road 87, near Frankfort. Continuing, there is an interchange at SR 138.

Entering Fayette County, the road turns west-northwest, bypassing south of Washington Court House. The next major junction is with I-71 near Jeffersonville; rather than have a direct interchange, each freeway indirectly connects to the other via interchanges with SR 435.

As the route continues through flat farmlands, it enters Greene County, bypasses north of Jamestown and south of Xenia. At the junction for Exit 48 in Xenia, the left lane bypasses Xenia and the right lane becomes Business Route 35 East (running concurrently with Xenia's Main Street). Business Route 35 continues east until it meets US 35 at Exit 55.

Between US 68 and US 42, the route is designated the "Sheriff Gene Fischer Memorial Highway" in honor of late Greene County sheriff Gene Fischer, who died unexpectedly on November 16, 2021.

Past the Xenia bypass, the road reverts to an at-grade expressway. From a bit east of Orchard Lane in Beavercreek Township to a bit west of Factory Road in Beavercreek, the route has a superstreet configuration.

US 35 once again returns to freeway status at the North Fairfield Road interchange in Beavercreek. It next has a full-access interchange with I-675, also in Beavercreek.

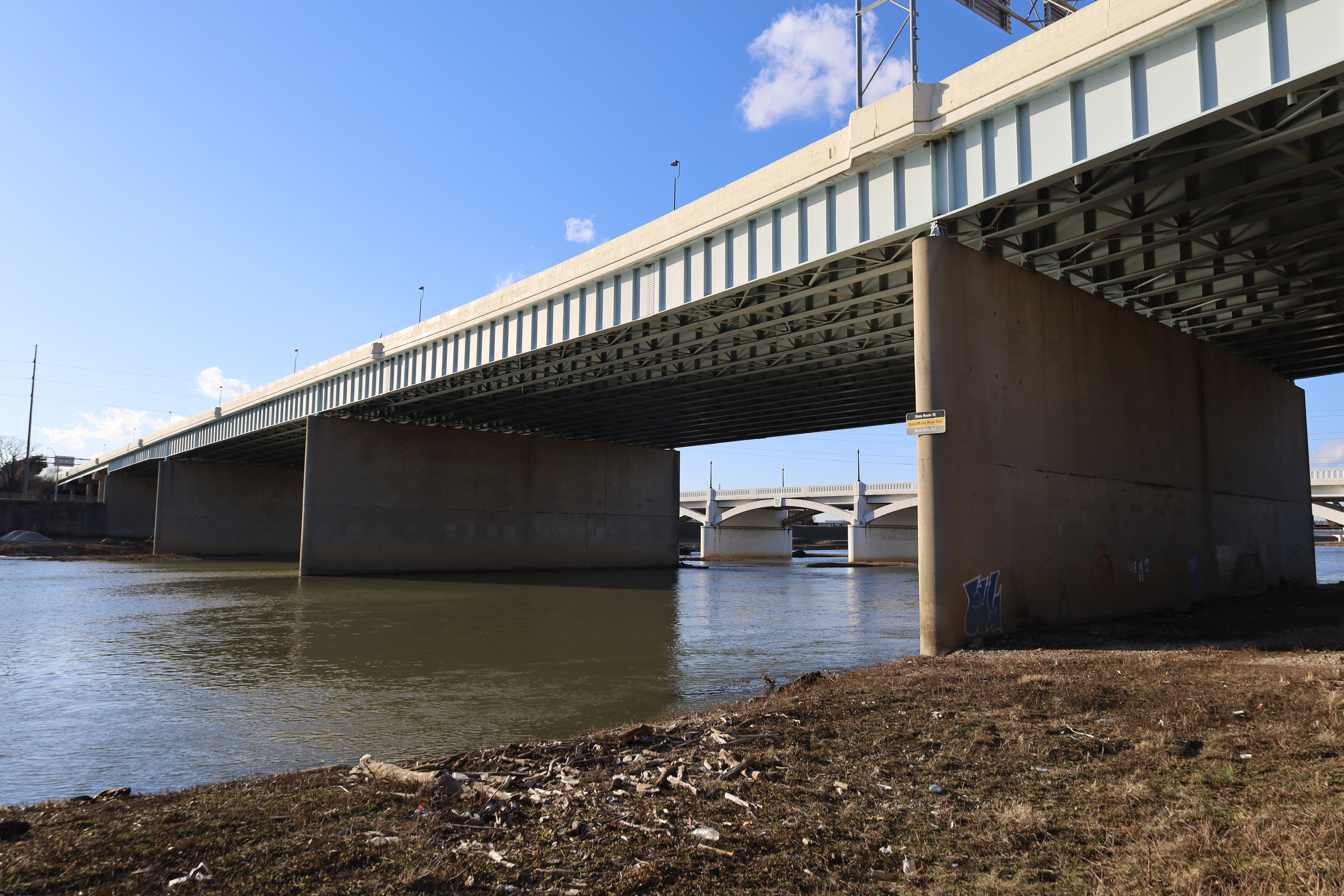
The highway crosses the Great Miami River in Dayton, Ohio

Several miles later, in Montgomery County, the road opens into a three-lane highway (with five lanes in some parts) each way through downtown Dayton. Turning west, the highway has a full-access interchange with I-75 in downtown Dayton. Past I-75, the route becomes an expressway, with a mix of interchanges and at-grade intersections.

After entering Drexel, just west of Dayton, the highway turns north. At the border with Trotwood, the route turns due west on West Third Street/Eaton Pike; the roadway that had carried US 35 continues as SR 49, an at-grade expressway also known as the "Northwest Connector" or as the "Trotwood Connector". The roadway carrying US 35, now two lanes and undivided, travels through New Lebanon as Main Street.

US 35 then enters Preble County and travels through West Alexandria as Dayton Street. The route next proceeds to Eaton; after passing through downtown as Main Street, the route turns northwest onto Eaton Richmond Pike (Main Street continues as SR 122). The highway travels toward I-70 near New Paris, widens to four lanes as it approaches SR 320, turns north and briefly becomes four lanes undivided, then reduces to single-lane ramps and merges with the Interstate at a partial interchange. Running concurrently with I-70, US 35 travels approximately two miles (3.2 km) to the Indiana state line.

=== Indiana ===
US 35 enters Wayne County, Indiana concurrent with I-70 and passes north of Richmond, before splitting off on the northwest side of Richmond. US 35 then travels in a northwesterly path as a winding two-lane highway, passing through agricultural land, and through intersections with State Road 38 (SR 38), SR 1 and, in Randolph County, US 36. The highway then passes through a corner of Henry County, with no major junctions.

In Delaware County, the highway reaches the edge of the city of Muncie, where it merges with SR 3 and SR 67 as a four-lane expressway. The expressway heads north, skirting the east side of Muncie, passing over the White River and through interchanges with Memorial Drive in unincorporated Center Township and SR 32 in Muncie. Continuing along the east edge of Muncie, there is a right-in/right-out intersection in both directions with East Centennial Avenue and an intersection with East McGalliard Road. Northeast of Muncie, at the border of unincorporated Center Township and Hamilton Township, there is an intersection with East Riggin Road. Shortly thereafter, SR 67 splits off the expressway at an interchange, followed by a partial interchange with Old State Road 3, leading back into Muncie. Soon after the expressway ends, with the roadway becoming a two-lane highway.

Near the town of Royerton, US 35 turns west onto SR 28, toward I-69, as SR 3 continues north. After a short overlap with SR 28, US 35 turns north onto I-69.

US 35 overlaps I-69, passing into Grant County, through an interchange with SR 26, to SR 22, where US 35 leaves I-69 and heads west on SR 22 to travel through the cities of Gas City and, in Howard County, Greentown. Just east of Kokomo, US 35 turns north onto the US 31 freeway. It overlaps US 31 for only 4.5 miles (7.2 km), to a partial interchange where it splits off, heading west as a two-lane roadway. US 35 passes just north of a Chrysler manufacturing plant before an intersection with SR 931, the former route of US 31. The roadway briefly widens to a four-lane divided highway at a partial interchange with Davis Road, which connects from Kokomo. US 35 leaves the Kokomo area heading northwest into Cass County, toward Logansport.

As US 35 nears Logansport, the roadway becomes a four-lane expressway, just prior to its intersection with US 24. The expressway bypasses Logansport to the south as part of the Hoosier Heartland Highway. There is a northbound (westbound) exit to Monticello Road, the former routing of these highways. Northbound US 35 and westbound US 24 exit the Hoosier Heartland Highway at a split diamond interchange and run concurrently along the interchange's westbound one-way frontage road, having a very short overlap with SR 25 (southbound US 35 and eastbound US 24 run concurrently along the eastbound one-way frontage road, also overlapping SR 25). US 35 and US 24 then turn northwest from the frontage road onto another expressway on the west edge of Logansport. Along the roadway, there is an intersection with the aforementioned Monticello Road and a two-quadrant interchange with Old State Road 25. After crossing the Wabash River, the overlapped routes have a final interchange where US 24 exits heading due west, while US 35 continues north-northwest.

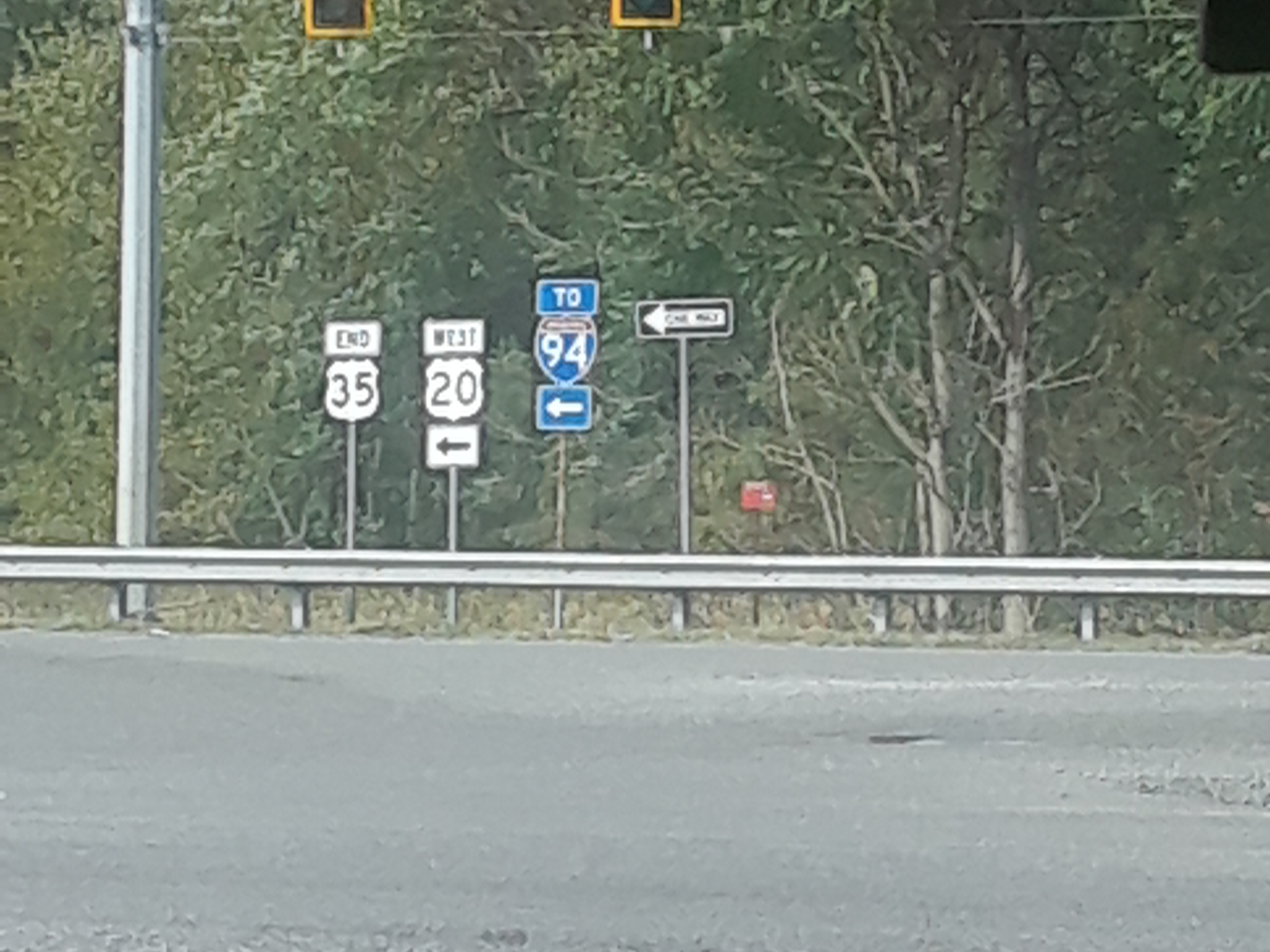
Northern terminus of US 35, located east of I-94 near Michigan City, IN

Soon after US 24 leaves US 35, US 35 narrows back to a two-lane road and travels through the town of Winamac, in Pulaski County. Once in Starke County, the route travels through the town of Knox. In Davis Township, near Hamlet, the US 30 expressway provides an interchange. After entering LaPorte County, US 35 travels to the community of South Center in Union Township; there it turns west on US 6 (the US 35 roadway continues north as South County Road 300 E). The route next turns north-northwest until it leaves the concurrency with US 6 northward in Washington Township, near Kingsbury. Turning northwest, US 35 travels through the city of La Porte; in northwestern La Porte, an intersection with SR 39 provides access to the Indiana Toll Road/I-80/I-90. US 35 next crosses under the Indiana Toll Road with no direct interchange access, in unincorporated Center Township. Farther northwest, US 35 has its northern terminus where it meets US 20 in Springfield Township, just east of an interchange with I-94, near Michigan City.

==== Logansport issues ====
Logansport area residents, the sheriff's department and at least one transportation expert have voiced concerns about the split diamond interchange used on the Logansport section of the Hoosier Heartland Highway. From the interchange's opening in October 2013 through February 28, 2016, there had been 71 two-vehicle crashes at or near the interchange, 53 of those at the interchange's four intersections, two fatalities, and a number of injuries. Possible causes for the accidents include drivers' unfamiliarity with this type of interchange, which is typically built in cities, and is not common in semi-rural small towns; drivers' mistaking the frontage roads for entrance ramps and not stopping when required; the complexity of four major traffic routes converging on one interchange; ramp/frontage traffic controlled by stop signs alone, with cross-traffic not having to stop; stop signs not clearly visible at the crest of the exit ramps. In response in 2014, the Indiana Department of Transportation (INDOT) added signage, placed flashing lights on the stop signs, and installed rumble strips. These steps reduced, but did not eliminate the problems, with one of the fatalities taking place after these fixes. INDOT was planning by spring 2016 to add overhead flashers, move the stop signs to more visible positions, install channelizing islands and increase overhead intersection lighting.

== History ==
=== West Virginia ===
Originally, US 35 was routed from Charleston, West Virginia, on the north side of the Kanawha River (the current WV 62) to Point Pleasant until the collapse of the Silver Bridge in 1967. When the new Silver Memorial Bridge was completed in 1969, US 35 was moved to the south side of the river (the former WV 17) away from Point Pleasant, and its southern terminus was in St. Albans, West Virginia, at the junction of US 60.

Before funding was made available to convert US 35 to an expressway, a possibility had been put forward that the route would have been completed as a toll road.

Prior to June 15, 2009, US 35 was relocated onto a new four-lane, mostly at-grade, expressway alignment running from I-64 in Teays Valley to a point about 1.1 miles (1.8 km) before the Lower Buffalo Bridge, for a length of 11.3 miles (18.2 km). On that date, the old segment of US 35 between US 60 and the Lower Buffalo Bridge was signed as WV 817.

Prior to July 2011, the expressway segment of US 35 between Beech Hill, near the junction with WV 817 north, and near Henderson was completed, tying into some older expressway segments in the Henderson area and crossing the Silver Memorial Bridge. This had an approximate total length of 9.9 miles (15.9 km).

The remaining 15.4-mile (24.8 km) section of two-lane roadway from about 1.1 miles (1.8 km) before the Lower Buffalo Bridge to Beech Hill, near the junction with WV 817 north, was completed and opened to traffic on November 11, 2021. This section had a $174 million contract awarded on June 2, 2015, for its completion. The section was tentatively to have been completed by fall of 2019, but the West Virginia Department of Transportation originally extended the completion date to August 2021, but then that was delayed to November 11, 2021. The speed limit for all of US 35 within West Virginia is 65 mph.

=== Ohio ===
Before the adoption of the U.S. Highway System in 1926, the route in Ohio was known in its entirety as SR 11. By 1966, the first freeway portion of the route began construction, comprising the Chillicothe bypass.

Freeway portions on the east side of Dayton and south side of Xenia were completed by 1971, and around Washington Court House by 1974.

Before 1988, westbound traffic on US 35 west of I-75 in Dayton turned north along Williams Street, then was routed along West Third Street (eastbound traffic on West Third Street turned south on Broadway Street back to US 35); on October 25, 1996, a new expressway alignment through west Dayton, known as the "US 35 West" project, was completed. This portion of the route in Dayton west of I-75 is designated the "C. J. McLin Jr. Parkway", in honor of the late state representative who advocated for and worked toward the construction of "US 35 West".

The portion of US 35 from Drexel to SR 320 is the only two-lane, undivided section of the route remaining in Ohio. US 35 is a major Appalachian Development Highway System Corridor linking I-70 and points west to I-64 and points east.

The portion of the route within Gallia County is designated the "Bob Evans Highway", in honor of the restaurateur and pork sausage marketer who spent most of his life in the county.

The portion of the route between Gallipolis and Jackson is designated as part of the Welsh Scenic Byway by the Ohio Department of Transportation, celebrating Welsh immigrants who settled in southeastern Ohio during the 19th century.

The interchange at North Fairfield Road in Beavercreek opened on October 25, 2003. As part of the project, the existing ramp from State Route 835 (Research Boulevard) to westbound US 35 was removed, with the area converted to wetlands, and part of the pavement used as a connection to a regional rail trail.

The section between Richmond Dale and Chillicothe was upgraded to a freeway in 2005.

On August 26, 2015, the at-grade intersection with Keystone Furnace Road and McCarty Lane at the Jackson–Lick Township line was converted into a right-in/right-out interchange.

In November 2021, the stretch of road from Orchard Lane in Beavercreek Township to Factory Road in Beavercreek was converted to a superstreet configuration, according to the Ohio Department of Transportation. Construction is currently ongoing at Trebein Road and Valley Road, as this intersection is converted into an interchange with US 35 (adding an exit).

=== Indiana ===
The first signed road along the what would later become US 35 was SR 35, which ran from west of Jonesboro and Kokomo, and SR 15 from Burlington to Michigan City. In 1926 state road numbers were changed; SR 35 became SR 18 and SR 15 became SR 29. Many changes took place in 1930 along what would later become US 35, the first of which was a state road proposed between SR 38, near Richmond, and Muncie. This was followed by SR 21 being added to the state road system between Muncie and St. Anthony, and a state road being proposed between St. Anthony and SR 9 west of Jonesboro. The last change in 1930 was a proposed state road between Kokomo and Burlington.

Between late 1930 and early 1932 SR 21 was added to the state road system between SR 38 and Muncie and between St. Anthony and Jonesboro. At the same time SR 18 became SR 22 and was extended east through Jonesboro and west to Burlington. Also during this time frame a state road was proposed between Kokomo and Logansport. In late 1932 or early 1933 SR 21 was paved between Richmond and Muncie and SR 22 was paved between Kokomo and Burlington.

US 35 was first designated in the state of Indiana in 1935, US 35 was routed from the Ohio state line, near Richmond, to Michigan City, via Muncie, Kokomo, Burlington and Logansport, along SR 21, SR 22 and SR 29. At this time the Indiana State Highway Commission authorized the addition of SR 17 between Kokomo and Logansport. The construction on the authorized segment of SR 17 began between 1939 and 1941, with the construction being completed by 1942. US 35 was rerouted away from Kingsbury between 1942 and 1945, with the old route through the town becoming SR 829.

The multi-lane road of US 35 from US 6 to La Porte opened either in 1951 or 1952. The US 35 designation was rerouted onto SR 3 and SR 28 between Munice and St. Anthony between 1956 and 1957. The old route of US 35 became locally maintained roads and streets. The bypass of Jonesboro was completed in either 1965 or 1966, and US 35 was routed along it from SR 15 to the west; east of SR 15 was signed as only SR 22. In 1967 or 1968 US 35 was rerouted onto SR 28, I-69, and SR 22 from St. Anthony to Jonesboro. The old route of US 35 became county roads or city streets.

By 1970 US 35 was rerouted onto US 31 (now SR 931) to bypass downtown Kokomo. US 35 was rerouted onto SR 3 to bypass downtown Muncie between 1972 and 1973. By 1974 US 35 was rerouted away from downtown Logansport on the a bypass around the south and east sides of the city. The US 35 designation in Richmond was moved onto I-70 between 1997 and 1999.

In October 2008 the Indiana Department of Transportation and the City of Michigan City came to an agreement for the city to assume maintenance of the segment of US 35 from the US 20/SR 212 interchange to US 12. The city did so in October 2009, and the former segment of US 35 became known as Michigan Boulevard. INDOT submitted an application in October 2008 to the American Association of State Highway and Transportation Officials (AASHTO) to extend the decommissioning of US 35 to include the entire portion of the roadway from the east junction with US 20, through the US 20/SR 212 interchange, to US 12. INDOT still had signage, however, that indicated US 35 overlapped US 20 to the US 20/SR 212 interchange, which was not corrected until 2019.

New bypass roads in Kokomo and Logansport opened in 2013 and US 35 was rerouted along both new roadways.

== Major junctions ==
State	County	Location	mi (Note: Mileposts reset at state line crossings. In Ohio, US 35 is considered an east–west highway, its mileposts run from west to east.)	km	Exit	Destinations	Notes
West Virginia	Putnam	Teays Valley	−0.20	−0.32		Teays Valley Road (CR 33) – St. Albans, Scott Depot	Continuation as unsigned US 35 Spur
West Virginia	Putnam	Teays Valley	0.00	0.00	Southern end of expressway		
West Virginia	Putnam	Teays Valley	0.00	0.00	—	I-64 – Huntington, St. Albans, Charleston	Southern end of US 35; hybrid interchange; I-64 exit 40
West Virginia	Putnam		2.5	4.0	—	WV 34 / CR 13 (Poplar Fork Road) – Winfield	Interchange
West Virginia	Putnam		5.8	9.3		To WV 817 (via CR 817/2)	Intersection
West Virginia	Putnam		12.4	20.0	—	To WV 62 (via WV 869) / Shamrock Lane – Buffalo, Eleanor	Interchange; western end of WV 869; access to WV 817
West Virginia	Mason	Beech Hill	26.5	42.6		To WV 817	Intersection
West Virginia	Mason		33.5	53.9		To WV 817 / CR 175 (Lock Eleven Road)	Intersection
West Virginia	Mason	Henderson	35.8	57.6	Northern end of expressway; southern end of freeway		
West Virginia	Mason	Henderson	35.8	57.6	—	WV 2 – Point Pleasant, Huntington	Partial cloverleaf interchange
Ohio River			36.58 174.433	58.87 280.723	Silver Memorial Bridge; West Virginia–Ohio state line		
Ohio	Gallia	Gallipolis Township	174.238	280.409	174	SR 7 – Pomeroy, Gallipolis	Westbound exit and eastbound entrance
Ohio	Gallia	Gallipolis Township	173.769	279.654	173	SR 735 to SR 7 – Pomeroy, Gallipolis	Eastbound left exit and westbound left entrance; western end of SR 735
Ohio	Gallia	Gallipolis–Green township line	170.647– 169.975	274.630– 273.548	169	SR 160 – Vinton, Gallipolis	Hybrid interchange; no eastbound exit
Ohio	Gallia	Springfield Township	169.319	272.493	169	SR 160 – Vinton, Gallipolis	Eastbound exit and westbound entrance
Ohio	Gallia	Springfield Township	165.473	266.303	165	SR 850 (Rodney Pike)	
Ohio	Gallia	Raccoon Township–Rio Grande line	160.679	258.588	160	SR 325 – Vinton, Rio Grande	
Ohio	Gallia	Raccoon Township–Rio Grande line	160.679	258.588	Western end of freeway; eastern end of expressway		
Ohio	Gallia	Raccoon Township	157.596	253.626		SR 279 west – Centerville (Thurman post office), Oak Hill	Intersection; eastern end of SR 279
Ohio	Jackson	Bloomfield Township	148.248	238.582		SR 327 north – Wellston, Cooper Hollow Wildlife Area	One-quadrant interchange; southern end of SR 327
Ohio	Jackson	Lick Township–Jackson line	143.868	231.533	—	Keystone Furnace Road / McCarty Lane	Interchange: right-in/right-out in both directions
Ohio	Jackson	Lick Township	142.863	229.916	142B	SR 32 / SR 124 – Athens, Cincinnati	"Windmill" interchange
Ohio	Jackson	Lick Township	142.268	228.958	Western end of expressway; eastern end of freeway		
Ohio	Jackson	Lick Township	142.268	228.958	142A	Pattonsville Road / Broadway Street	
Ohio	Jackson	Lick Township	140.728	226.480	140	SR 93 – Coalton, Jackson	
Ohio	Jackson	Coal–Liberty township line	138.418	222.762	138	US 35 Bus. – Jackson (Chillicothe Pike)	
Ohio	Jackson	Coal–Liberty township line	138.418	222.762	Western end of freeway; eastern end of expressway		
Ohio	Ross	Jefferson Township	126.368	203.370	Western end of expressway; eastern end of freeway		
Ohio	Ross	Jefferson Township	126.368	203.370	126	Vigo Road / Watson Road – Richmond Dale	
Ohio	Ross	Liberty–Springfield township line	117.388	188.918	117	US 50 east – Athens	Hybrid interchange; eastern end of US 50 overlap
Ohio	Ross	Scioto Township	115.858	186.455	115	US 50 west (Eastern Avenue) to US 23 south	Western end of US 50 overlap; westbound exit and eastbound entrance
Ohio	Ross	Scioto Township	115.218	185.425	43B	US 23 south to US 50 west – Portsmouth, Waverly	Eastern end of US 23 overlap; eastbound exit and westbound left entrance
Ohio	Ross	Scioto Township–Chillicothe line	113.948	183.382	44	To US 50 west / Main Street – Chillicothe	
Ohio	Ross	Scioto Township	112.908	181.708	46	US 23 north – Columbus	Western end of US 23 overlap; westbound exit and eastbound entrance
Ohio	Ross	Scioto Township–Chillicothe line	112.068	180.356	112	SR 159 / US 23 Bus. (Bridge Street) to US 23 north – Kingston, Columbus	Partial cloverleaf interchange
Ohio	Ross	Scioto Township	110.858	178.409	110	SR 104 (High Street) to SR 207 / US 23 north	
Ohio	Ross	Union Township	108.978	175.383	109	To US 50 / Pleasant Valley Road / Egypt Pike	Westbound exit and eastbound entrance
Ohio	Ross	Union Township	107.068	172.309	107	County Road 550 – Pleasant Valley	Hybrid trumpet interchange
Ohio	Ross	Concord Township	100.088	161.076	100	County Road 87 – Frankfort	
Ohio	Ross	Concord Township	97.088	156.248	97	SR 138 – Greenfield, Clarksburg	
Ohio	Fayette	Union Township	85.531	137.649	85	SR 753 – Greenfield, Washington Court House	
Ohio	Fayette	Union Township	83.672	134.657	83	SR 41 – Greenfield	
Ohio	Fayette	Union Township	82.517– 82.084	132.798– 132.101	82	US 22 / US 62 / SR 3 – Washington Court House, Hillsboro	Ramps connect to a pair of two-way frontage roads, each of which runs between US 62 and US 22/SR 3
Ohio	Fayette	Union Township	80.169	129.019	80	Palmer Road	
Ohio	Fayette	Jasper–Jefferson township line	72.666	116.945	72	SR 435 to I-71	Westbound exit and eastbound entrance; I-71's interchange with SR 435 lies between US 35's two interchanges with SR 435
Ohio	Fayette	Jefferson Township	70.361	113.235	70	SR 435 to I-71 – Columbus, Cincinnati	Eastbound exit and westbound entrance; western end of SR 435
Ohio	Greene	Jamestown	63.766	102.621	64	SR 72 – Jamestown, Cedarville	
Ohio	Greene	Silvercreek Township	62.012	99.799	62	Old US 35 – Jamestown	
Ohio	Greene	Xenia Township	55.538	89.380	55	Bickett Road (US 35 Bus.)	
Ohio	Greene	Xenia Township–Xenia line	53.125	85.496	53	US 68 (Home Avenue) – Wilmington	
Ohio	Greene	Xenia Township–Xenia line	51.221– 51.203	82.432– 82.403	51	US 42 – Lebanon	Signed as exits 51B (north) and 51A (south)
Ohio	Greene	Xenia	50.522	81.307	50	Lower Bellbrook Road	
Ohio	Greene	Xenia–Xenia Township– Beavercreek Township tripoint	48.243	77.640	48	US 35 Bus. east (West Main Street) – Xenia	US 35 west merges onto US 35 Bus. roadway; US 35 east has a left exit to US 35 Bus.
Ohio	Greene	Beavercreek Township	47.3	76.1	47	Trebein Road/Valley Road	New interchange to replace existing traffic signal
Ohio	Greene	Beavercreek Township	47.3	76.1	Western end of freeway; eastern end of expressway		
Ohio	Greene	Beavercreek	43.750– 43.421	70.409– 69.879	Western end of expressway; eastern end of freeway		
Ohio	Greene	Beavercreek	43.750– 43.421	70.409– 69.879	44	SR 835 west (Research Boulevard) / North Fairfield Road	Eastern end of SR 835; eastbound US 35 is signed for North Fairfield Road only
Ohio	Greene	Beavercreek	42.778	68.845	43	SR 835 (Research Boulevard)	Eastbound exit only
Ohio	Greene	Beavercreek	41.648	67.026	42	I-675 – Cincinnati, Columbus	Westbound US 35 uses collector–distributor lane; exits 13A and 13B on I-675
Ohio	Greene–Montgomery county line	Beavercreek–Riverside city line	41.179	66.271	—	Dayton–Xenia Road / Linden Avenue	Eastbound exit and westbound entrance
Ohio	Montgomery	Riverside	40.020	64.406	—	Woodman Drive (SR 835)	Western end of SR 835
Ohio	Montgomery	Dayton	39.000	62.764	—	Smithville Road	
Ohio	Montgomery	Dayton	37.840	60.898	—	Steve Whalen Boulevard	
Ohio	Montgomery	Dayton	36.940	59.449	—	Keowee Street / Wayne Avenue	Westbound exit is attached to Steve Whalen Boulevard exit; access from northbound Keowee Street to westbound US 35 via Wayne Avenue
Ohio	Montgomery	Dayton	36.290– 36.190	58.403– 58.242	—	SR 48 (Main Street) / Jefferson Street	
Ohio	Montgomery	Dayton	35.970	57.888	—	Ludlow Street / Perry Street	
Ohio	Montgomery	Dayton	35.660	57.389	Bridge over the Great Miami River		
Ohio	Montgomery	Dayton	35.290	56.794	—	I-75 / SR 4 north – Cincinnati, Toledo; Stewart Street	I-75 exit 52; eastern end of SR 4 overlap; ramps to southbound I-75 and from northbound I-75 include entrances and exits for Stewart Street
Ohio	Montgomery	Dayton	34.310	55.217	—	James H. McGee Boulevard	
Ohio	Montgomery	Dayton	34.310	55.217	Western end of freeway; eastern end of expressway		
Ohio	Montgomery	Dayton	33.470	53.865		Abbey Avenue	Intersection; the Wright Company factory site, which later housed the Dayton-Wright Company, is located at the corner of Abbey Avenue and West Third Street
Ohio	Montgomery	Dayton	32.590	52.449	—	Gettysburg Avenue (SR 4 south)	Interchange; western end of SR 4 overlap
Ohio	Montgomery	Dayton	31.680	50.984		Liscum Drive	Intersection
Ohio	Montgomery	Jefferson Township (Drexel)	30.980	49.857		Infirmary Road	Intersection
Ohio	Montgomery	Jefferson Township (Drexel)—Trotwood line	30.220	48.634		SR 49 north – Greenville	US 35 turns west on West Third Street/Eaton Pike; roadway continues as at-grade expressway SR 49; southern end of SR 49
Ohio	Montgomery	Jefferson Township (Drexel)—Trotwood line	30.220	48.634	Western end of expressway		
Ohio	Preble	West Alexandria	17.220	27.713		SR 503 (Main Street)	
Ohio	Preble	Eaton	11.920	19.183		SR 122 east (South Franklin Street)	Eastern end of SR 122 overlap
Ohio	Preble	Eaton	11.680	18.797		US 127 / SR 732 south (Barron Street) – Fort St. Clair	Northern end of SR 732
Ohio	Preble	Eaton	11.420	18.379		SR 122 west (West Main Street)	Western end of SR 122 overlap; US 35 turns northwest off Main Street as Eaton Richmond Pike
Ohio	Preble	Jackson Township	2.380	3.830		SR 320 north	Southern end of SR 320
Ohio	Preble	Jackson–Jefferson township line	1.660	2.672	Eastern end of freeway		
Ohio	Preble	Jackson–Jefferson township line	1.660	2.672	1	I-70 west – Indianapolis	Eastern end of I-70 overlap; US 35 west merges onto freeway; eastbound exit and westbound entrance; exit 1 on I-70
			0.000	0.000	Ohio–Indiana state line		
Indiana	Wayne	Wayne Township	0.257	0.414	156	US 40 (National Road) – Lewisburg, Ohio	Exit 156 on I-70; signed as exits 156B (east) and 156A (west)
Indiana	Wayne	Wayne Township	3.585	5.769	153	SR 227 – Union City	Exit 153 on I-70
Indiana	Wayne	Wayne Township	5.155	8.296	151	US 27 (Chester Boulevard)	Single-point urban interchange; exit 151 on I-70
Indiana	Wayne	Wayne Township	7.093	11.415	149B	I-70 west / Williamsburg Pike/Tom Raper Way – Indianapolis	Northern end of I-70 overlap; US 35 north departs freeway; US 35 south merges with freeway, roadway continues as Williamburg Pike/Tom Raper Way; exit 149B on I-70
Indiana	Wayne	Wayne Township	7.093	11.415	Northern end of freeway		
Indiana	Wayne	Webster Township	8.366	13.464		SR 38 west – Greensfork, Hagerstown, New Castle	Eastern end of SR 38
Indiana	Wayne	Dalton Township	23.001	37.017		SR 1	
Indiana	Randolph	Union Township	27.055	43.541		US 36 – Summit Lake State Park	
Indiana	Henry	No major junctions					
Indiana	Delaware	Center Township–Muncie line	40.904	65.829	Southern end of expressway		
Indiana	Delaware	Center Township–Muncie line	40.904	65.829	—	SR 3 south / SR 67 south – New Castle, Muncie, Ball State University	Interchange; southern end of SR 3/SR 67 overlap; US 35 north merges onto expressway; no access from US 35 north to SR 3 south / SR 67 south or SR 3 north / SR 67 north to US 35 south
Indiana	Delaware	Center Township	42.508	68.410	—	Memorial Drive	Interchange
Indiana	Delaware	Muncie	43.506	70.016	—	SR 32 – Winchester, Muncie	Interchange
Indiana	Delaware	Hamilton Township	47.010	75.655	—	SR 67 north (Broadway) – Portland	Interchange; northern end of SR 67 overlap
Indiana	Delaware	Hamilton Township	47.650	76.685	—	Muncie (Old State Road 3 south) – Ball State University	Interchange; southbound exit and northbound entrance
Indiana	Delaware	Hamilton Township	47.650	76.685	Northern end of expressway		
Indiana	Delaware	Hamilton Township	49.899	80.305		SR 3 north / SR 28 east – Hartford City, Albany	Northern end of SR 3 overlap; southern end of SR 28 overlap
Indiana	Delaware	Harrison Township	59.924	96.438	Southern end of freeway		
Indiana	Delaware	Harrison Township	59.924	96.438	245	I-69 south / SR 28 west – Alexandria, Indianapolis	Southern end of I-69 overlap; northern end of SR 28 overlap; US 35 merges onto freeway; exit 245 on I-69
Indiana	Grant	Jefferson Township	70.157	112.907	255	SR 26 – Fairmount, Hartford City	Exit 255 on I-69
Indiana	Grant	Gas City–Jefferson Township– Monroe Township tripoint	74.241	119.479	259	I-69 north / SR 22 east – Fort Wayne, Upland, Taylor University	Northern end of I-69 overlap; southern end of SR 22 overlap; US 35 departs freeway; exit 259 on I-69
Indiana	Grant	Gas City–Jefferson Township– Monroe Township tripoint	74.241	119.479	Northern end of freeway		
Indiana	Grant	Jonesboro	78.546	126.408		SR 15 north – Indiana Wesleyan University	Southern end of SR 15
Indiana	Grant	Mill–Franklin township line	81.105	130.526		SR 9 – Anderson, Marion	
Indiana	Grant	Franklin Township	82.221	132.322		SR 37 – Elwood, Marion	
Indiana	Grant	Sims Township	89.138	143.454		SR 13 / SR 19 north – Elwood, Swayzee, Wabash	Southern end of SR 19 overlap
Indiana	Howard	Greentown	96.099	154.656		SR 213 south – Windfall	Northern end of SR 213
Indiana	Howard	Howard–Taylor township line	100.033	160.988		SR 19 south – Tipton, Wildcat Creek Reservoir Park	Northern end of SR 19 overlap
Indiana	Howard	Howard–Taylor township line	102.898	165.598	Southern end of freeway		
Indiana	Howard	Howard–Taylor township line	102.898	165.598	162	US 31 south / SR 22 east – Kokomo, Indianapolis	Southern end of US 31 overlap; western end of SR 22 overlap; western end of the eastern segment of SR 22; US 35 merges onto freeway; exit 162 on US 31
Indiana	Howard	Center Township	105.968	170.539	165	Touby Pike – Airport	Exit 165 on US 31
Indiana	Howard	Howard Township	107.361	172.781	166	US 31 north – South Bend	Northern end of US 31 overlap; northbound exit and southbound entrance; US 35 departs freeway; exit 166 on US 31
Indiana	Howard	Howard Township	107.361	172.781	Northern end of freeway		
Indiana	Howard	Howard–Clay township line	108.229	174.178		SR 931 to US 31 north – Peru, Kokomo	
Indiana	Howard	Clay Township	110.415	177.696	—	Kokomo, Downtown (Davis Road)	Interchange; southbound exit and northbound entrance
Indiana	Cass	Galveston	113.356	182.429		SR 18	
Indiana	Cass	Walton	119.925	193.001		SR 218	
Indiana	Cass	Washington Township	125.940	202.681	Southern end of expressway		
Indiana	Cass	Washington Township	125.940	202.681		US 24 east – Fort Wayne	Intersection; southern end of US 24 overlap
Indiana	Cass	Logansport	129.207	207.939	—	No Name (Monticello Road)	Interchange; northbound exit only; former US 24 west / US 35 north
Indiana	Cass	Washington Township	129.854	208.980	Northern end of expressway		
Indiana	Cass	Washington Township	129.854	208.980	—	SR 25 north / SR 329 south – Rochester	Split diamond interchange, together with interchange for SR 25 south; southern end of SR 25 overlap; northern end of SR 329; US 35 departs expressway and travels along frontage road
Indiana	Cass	Washington Township–Logansport line	130.129	209.422	—	SR 25 south / SR 29 south – Lafayette, Indianapolis	Split diamond interchange, together with interchange for SR 25 north; northern end of SR 25 overlap; US 35 turns north from frontage road onto other expressway
Indiana	Cass	Washington Township–Logansport line	130.129	209.422	Southern end of expressway		
Indiana	Cass	Logansport–Eel Township line	130.929	210.710	—	Old State Road 25	Two-quadrant interchange
Indiana	Cass	Eel–Noble township line	132.287	212.895	—	US 24 west / US 24 Bus. east – Logansport, Monticello	Interchange; northern end of US 24 overlap
Indiana	Cass	Eel–Noble township line	132.287	212.895	Northern end of expressway		
Indiana	Cass	Royal Center	141.679	228.010		SR 16 – Monon	
Indiana	Pulaski	Winamac	155.561	250.351		SR 119 south (Washington Street)	Northern end of the southern section of SR 119
Indiana	Pulaski	Winamac	156.058	251.151		SR 14 (11th Street)	Southern end of SR 14 overlap
Indiana	Pulaski	Winamac	156.184	251.354		SR 14 east	Northern end of SR 14 overlap
Indiana	Starke	California Township	166.257	267.565		SR 10 east – Bass Lake	Southern end of SR 10 overlap
Indiana	Starke	California Township	167.638	269.787		SR 10 west – North Judson	Northern end of SR 10 overlap
Indiana	Starke	Knox	172.655	277.861		SR 8 east (East Culver Road)	Southern end of SR 8 overlap
Indiana	Starke	Center Township	174.659	281.086		SR 8 west – LaCrosse, Hebron, Airport, Kankakee State Fish Wildlife Area	Northern end of SR 8 overlap
Indiana	Starke	Davis Township	179.953	289.606		US 30 – Valparaiso, Plymouth	This junction is an interchange on the US 30 expressway
Indiana	LaPorte	South Center	186.239	299.723		US 6 east – Walkerton	Southern end of US 6 overlap; US 35 turns west onto US 6; roadway continues as South County Road 300 E
Indiana	LaPorte	Washington Township	191.181	307.676		US 6 west – Gary	Northern end of US 6 overlap; US 35 turns north
Indiana	LaPorte	La Porte	198.058	318.743		SR 2 / SR 39 south (Lincolnway) to SR 4	Southern end of SR 39 overlap
Indiana	LaPorte	La Porte	199.947	321.784		SR 39 north to Indiana Toll Road – New Buffalo, Michigan	Northern end of SR 39 overlap
Indiana	LaPorte	Springfield Township	205.440	330.624		US 20 to I-94 – South Bend, Michigan City, Gary, Detroit, Chicago	Northern end of US 35
1.000 mi = 1.609 km; 1.000 km = 0.621 mi: Concurrency terminus; Incomplete access; Unopened

== Related routes ==
=== West Virginia spur route ===
U.S. Route 35 Spur
- Location: Teays Valley, West Virginia
- Length: 0.20 mi (320 m)

U.S. Route 35 Spur (US 35 Spur) is the unsigned continuation of US 35 past its southern end at I-64.

=== Xenia business route ===
U.S. Route 35 Business
- Location: Xenia, Ohio
- Length: 5.7 mi (9.2 km)

The route runs from US 35 at Exit 48 in Xenia (running concurrently with Main St) to US 35 at Exit 55.

=== Jackson business route ===
U.S. Route 35 Business
- Location: Jackson, Ohio
- Length: 5.79 mi (9.32 km)

The route runs from US 35 at the Chillicothe Pike exit to US 35 at the SR 32/SR 124 exit.
