= Ohio State Route 844 =

State highway in Greene County, Ohio, US

State Route 844
- McClernon Memorial Skyway
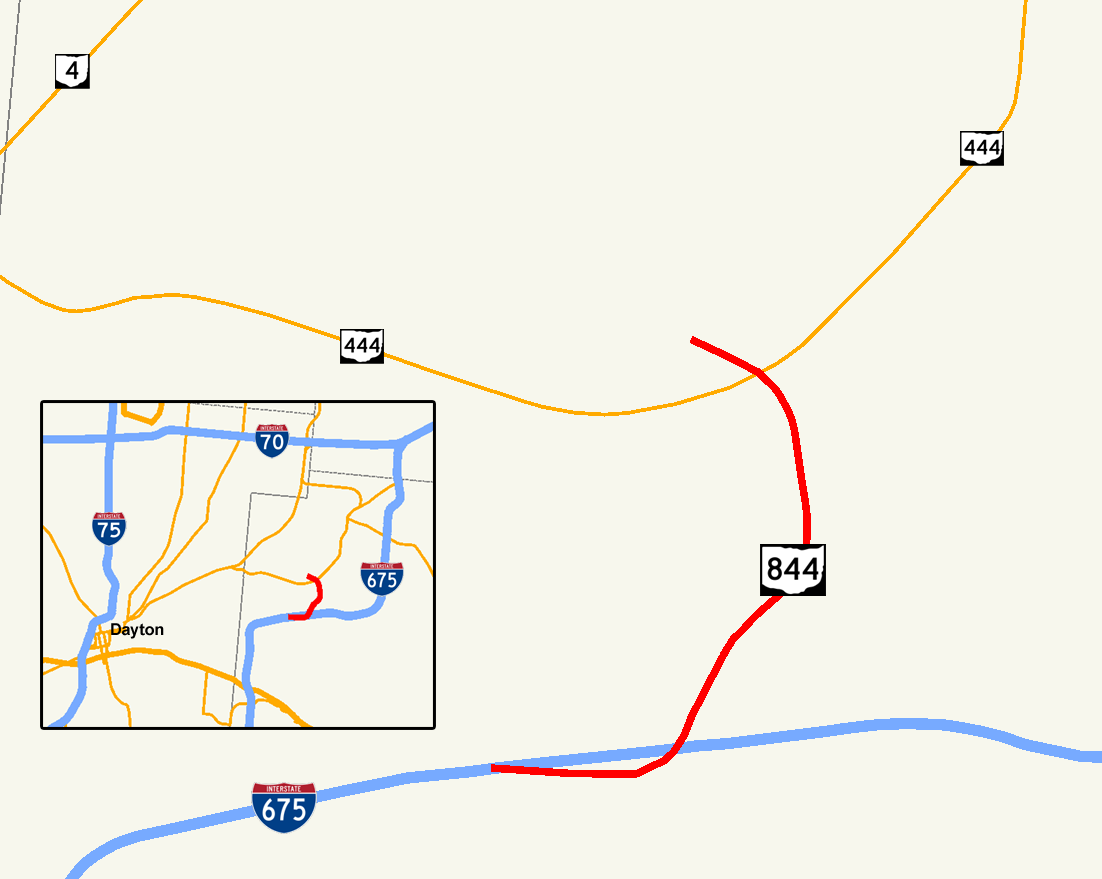

Route information
- Maintained by ODOT
- Length: 2.395 mi (3.854 km)
- Existed: 1989–present

Major junctions
- South end: I-675 in Beavercreek
- SR 444 in Fairborn
- North end: Wright-Patterson Air Force Base near Fairborn

Location
- Country: United States
- State: Ohio
- Counties: Greene

Highway system
- Ohio State Highway System; Interstate; US; State; Scenic
← SR 835	→ SR 850

State Route 844 (SR 844) is a 2.395-mile (3.854 km) state route that runs between Beavercreek and Wright-Patterson Air Force Base in the US state of Ohio. The north–south signed route is a spur freeway which mainly passes through government-owned properties. For some of its path, SR 844 passes through Wright State University. The highway was first signed in 1995 on the same alignment as today. SR 844 replaced the SR 444A designation of the highway, which dated back to 1989.

== Route description ==
Traffic volume on State Route 844
County Log Point	Volume
0.746	16,660
1.2	20,520
1.85	15,530
2.2	8,590
Volume: AADT; Source:

The highway is maintained by the Ohio Department of Transportation (ODOT). SR 844 begins at a partial interchange with Interstate 675 (I-675). The route heads northeast as a four-lane controlled-access highway, passing under North Fairfield Road. The road has a partial interchange with Colonel Glenn Highway, before passing on the southeast and east sides of Wright State University. The highway curves due north, having an interchange with University Boulevard. After the interchange with University Boulevard, the road curves northwest, passing over SR 444. Followed by an interchange with SR 444, SR 844 ends at Gate 15A of Wright-Patterson Air Force Base.

SR 844 is signed as "McClernon Memorial Skyway", after the late Brigadier General Glen J. McClernon. McClernon had been base commander during the time the university was being established—partially on land deeded to it by the Air Force base—and also had been a two-term mayor of Fairborn.

== History ==
SR 844 was originally SR 444A, which opened by 1989. After a public comment period in 1994, ODOT changed the number to "844" by 1995. Although legally designated as "McClernon-Skyway Memorial Drive" on September 22, 1989, SR 844 is both signed and recognized by the state as "McClernon Memorial Skyway".

== Future ==
There are plans to add a ramp from northbound SR 844 to northbound SR 444, and to add a ramp from northbound SR 444 to southbound SR 844. As of October 2013, the status and funding for this project are unknown.

== Major junctions ==
The entire route is in Greene County.

Location	mi	km	Exit	Destinations	Notes
Beavercreek	0.00	0.00		I-675	Southbound exit and northbound entrance; exit 17 on I-675
Fairborn	1.013	1.630	1	Colonel Glenn Highway	Southbound exit and northbound entrance
Fairborn	1.448– 2.043	2.330– 3.288	2	University Boulevard	Access to Wright State University
Fairborn	2.100	3.380	3	SR 444 (Broad Street)	Partial cloverleaf interchange; no access from SR 444 to SR 844 northbound
Wright-Patterson Air Force Base	2.395	3.854		Wright-Patterson Air Force Base Gate 15A	At-grade intersection; access pass required
1.000 mi = 1.609 km; 1.000 km = 0.621 mi: Incomplete access
