= Richmond Dale, Ohio =

- Unincorporated community and CDP
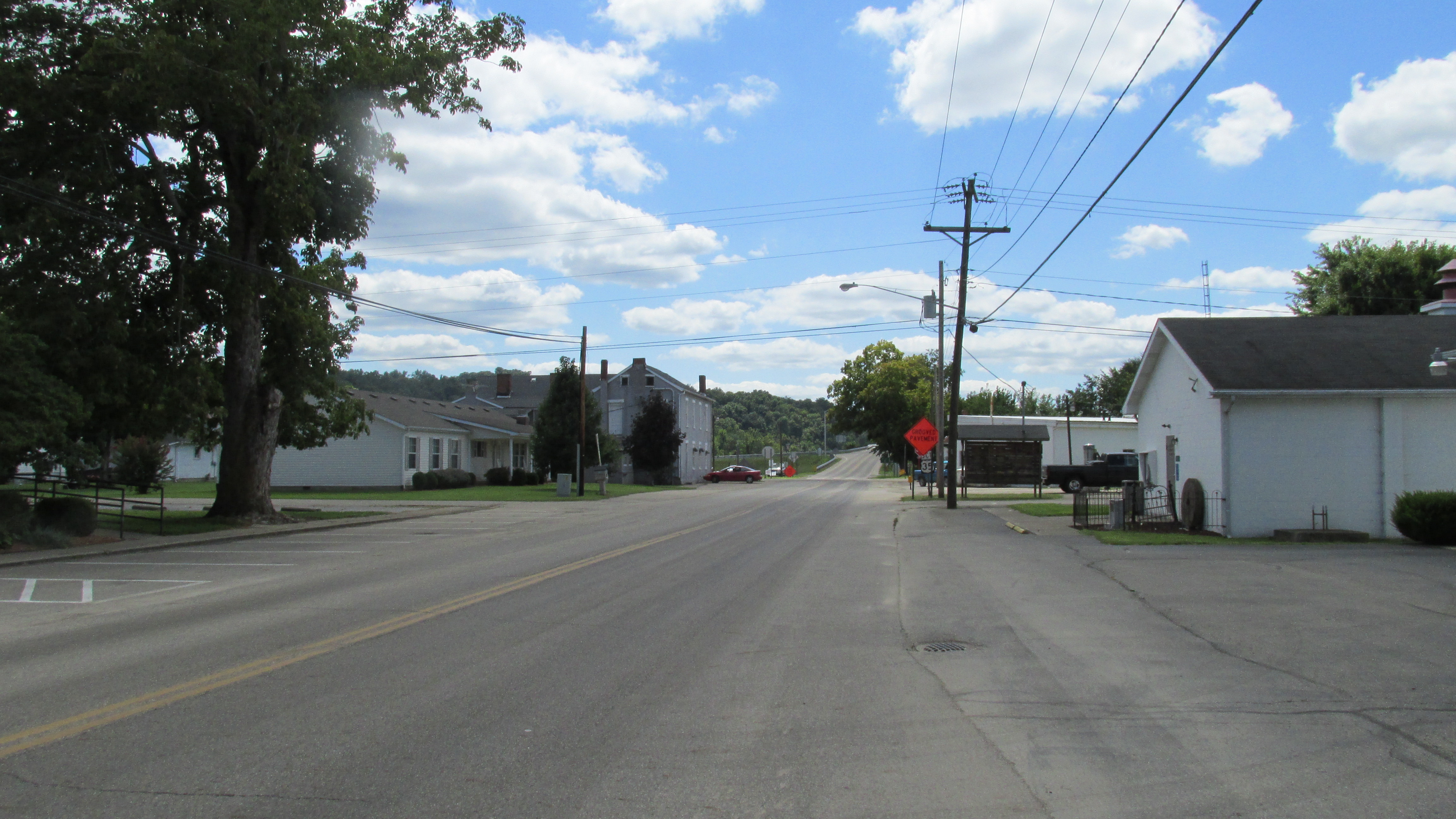
- Looking south towards the intersection of Market and Main Streets

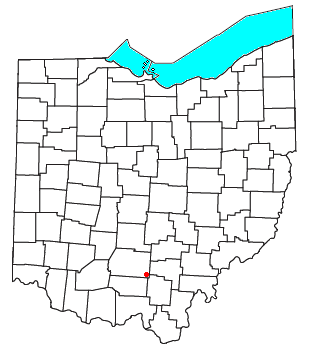
- Location of Richmond Dale, Ohio
- Coordinates: 39°12′07″N 82°48′50″W
- Country: United States
- State: Ohio
- County: Ross
- Township: Jefferson

Area
  - Total: 0.49 sq mi (1.28 km^{2})
- Elevation: 594 ft (181 m)

Population (2020)
  - Total: 386
  - Density: 781/sq mi (302/km^{2})
- Time zone: UTC-5 (Eastern (EST))
  - Summer (DST): UTC-4 (EDT)
- ZIP: 45673
- GNIS feature ID: 1085483

Richmond Dale (also known as Richmondale) is an unincorporated community and census-designated place in central Jefferson Township, Ross County, Ohio. It has a post office with the ZIP code 45673. It is located along U.S. Route 35 southeast of the county seat of Chillicothe. The population of the CDP was 386 at the 2020 census.

== History ==
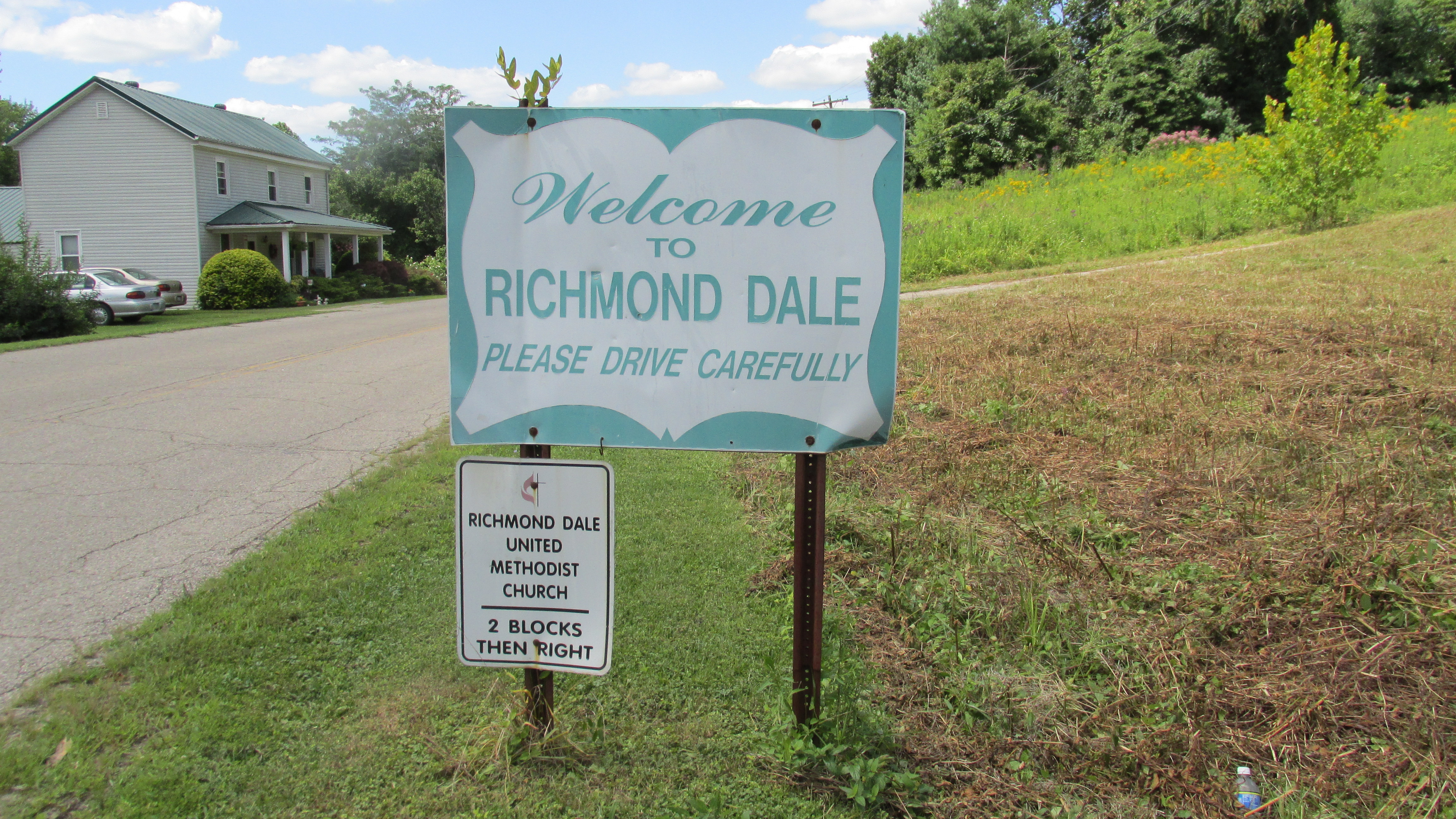
Richmond Dale community sign

Richmond Dale was laid out in 1811. The community derives its name from Richmond, Virginia, the native home of a first settler. A post office called Richmond was established in 1814, and the name was changed to Richmond Dale in 1829. The change in name was intended to prevent repetition with another Richmond, Ohio.

== Education ==
It is in the Southeastern Local School District.

Richmond Dale has a public library, a branch of the Chillicothe & Ross County Public Library.
