= Ohio State Route 444 =

State highway in Ohio, US

State Route 444
- SR 444 highlighted in red

Route information
- Maintained by ODOT
- Length: 8.43 mi (13.57 km)
- Existed: 1959–present

Major junctions
- South end: SR 4 in Dayton
- North end: I-675 near Fairborn

Location
- Country: United States
- State: Ohio
- Counties: Montgomery, Greene, Clark

Highway system
- Ohio State Highway System; Interstate; US; State; Scenic
← SR 440	→ SR 446

State Route 444 (SR 444, Ohio 444) is an 8.43-mile (13.57 km) state route that runs from Dayton through Fairborn in the US state of Ohio. Most of the north–south signed route is an urban four-lane highway which passes through both commercial and residential properties. For some of its path, SR 444 passes through Wright-Patterson Air Force Base.

The highway was first signed in 1959 on much the same alignment as today. SR 444 replaced the SR 4 designation of the highway, which dated back to 1927. In 1927, SR 4 replaced SR 52, which was established in 1923. The northern terminus was moved to its current location when a section of Interstate 675 (I–675) opened in 1976. In 2012 a section of the road was rerouted away from the base, using city streets in Fairborn.

== Route description ==
SR 444 begins at an interchange on SR 4, in Montgomery County. The highway heads southeast as a four-lane divided highway, passing through woodland and entering Greene County. The road passes through Wright-Patterson Air Force Base, then curves northeast, having an interchange with SR 844. SR 444 turns southeast crossing a railroad track, before turning northeast again, as a two-lane highway. The highway heads northeast through Fairborn, passing residential properties, before curving due north and becoming a four-lane undivided highway. As the highway heads north it crosses the railroad track again. The route turns due west towards the base, before turning due north. SR 444 begins a concurrency with SR 235, west of downtown Fairborn. The concurrency heads northeast, passing through commercial properties, before SR 235 turns due north. SR 444 continues northeast, passing through commercial properties, before becoming a two-lane highway. As a two-lane highway SR 444 passes through woodland, before having an interchange with I–675. This interchange is the northern terminus of SR 444.

SR 444 is designated "Freedom Memorial Highway", in honor of the 52 U.S. hostages held for 444 days during the 1979-1981 Iran hostage crisis and of the eight service members who died during a 1980 rescue attempt.

The entire length of SR 444 is part of the National Highway System, a system of routes important to the nation's economy, mobility and defense. The highway is maintained by the Ohio Department of Transportation (ODOT).

== History ==
In 1923 the route that became SR 444 was signed as SR 52. SR 52 was changed to SR 4 in 1927. SR 444 was originally signed in 1959, from its current southern terminus to Interstate 70, at the time it was U.S. Route 40. The northern terminus moved to its current position in 1976, when Interstate 675 was completed and signed along the alignment from SR 444’s current northern terminus north to I–70. In 2012, WPAFB extended its boundary; on October 9 of that year, the portion of route that would otherwise run through WPAFB was rerouted through Fairborn.

== Major intersections ==
County	Location	mi	km	Destinations	Notes
Montgomery	Dayton	0.00	0.00	SR 4 / Valley Pike – New Carlisle, Dayton	Interchange
Greene	Bath Township	0.65	1.05	Springfield Street west	Interchange, northbound entrance / southbound exit only
Greene	Fairborn	3.16	5.09	SR 844 to I-675 – Wright-Patterson Air Force Base	Interchange
Greene	Fairborn	5.79	9.32	SR 235 south (Xenia Drive)	Southern end of SR 235 concurrency
Greene	Fairborn	6.45	10.38	SR 235 north (Central Avenue)	Northern end of SR 235 concurrency
Greene–Clark county line	Bath–Mad River township line	8.09– 8.43	13.02– 13.57	I-675 to I-70 / Dayton-Springfield Road – Cincinnati, Columbus	Exit 24 (I-675)
1.000 mi = 1.609 km; 1.000 km = 0.621 mi: Concurrency terminus; Incomplete access
