= Ohio State Route 736 =

State highway in Union County, Ohio, US

State Route 736

Route information
- Maintained by ODOT
- Length: 8.41 mi (13.53 km)
- Existed: 1937–present

Major junctions
- South end: US 42 near Plain City
- North end: SR 38 in Marysville

Location
- Country: United States
- State: Ohio
- Counties: Union

Highway system
- Ohio State Highway System; Interstate; US; State; Scenic
← SR 735	→ SR 739

State Route 736 (SR 736, OH 736) is a north–south state highway in the central portion of the U.S. state of Ohio. Its southern terminus is at U.S. Route 42 (US 42) near Plain City, and its northern terminus is at a T-intersection with SR 38 in Marysville.

== Route description ==
SR 736 runs exclusively within Union County. Around 1,890 vehicles travel the road annually on average at the beginning of the route, and 2,220 near the end of the route.

SR 736 starts at US 42 near Plain City, and temporarily moves west, before moving northwest. The road continues in the same direction until its terminus at SR 38 in southwestern Marysville. The road passes through mostly farmland and private properties.

== History ==
The route was originally designated in 1937 along the routing that it currently occupies between US 42 and SR 38, SR 736 has not experienced any significant changes to its routing since its debut.

== Major intersections ==
The entire route is in Union County.

Location	mi	km	Destinations	Notes
Jerome Township	0.00	0.00	US 42 – Delaware, Plain City	
Marysville	8.41	13.53	SR 38 – Marysville, London	
1.000 mi = 1.609 km; 1.000 km = 0.621 mi
