= Dunbar Historic District =

Historic district in Ohio, United States

- U.S. National Register of Historic Places
- U.S. Historic district
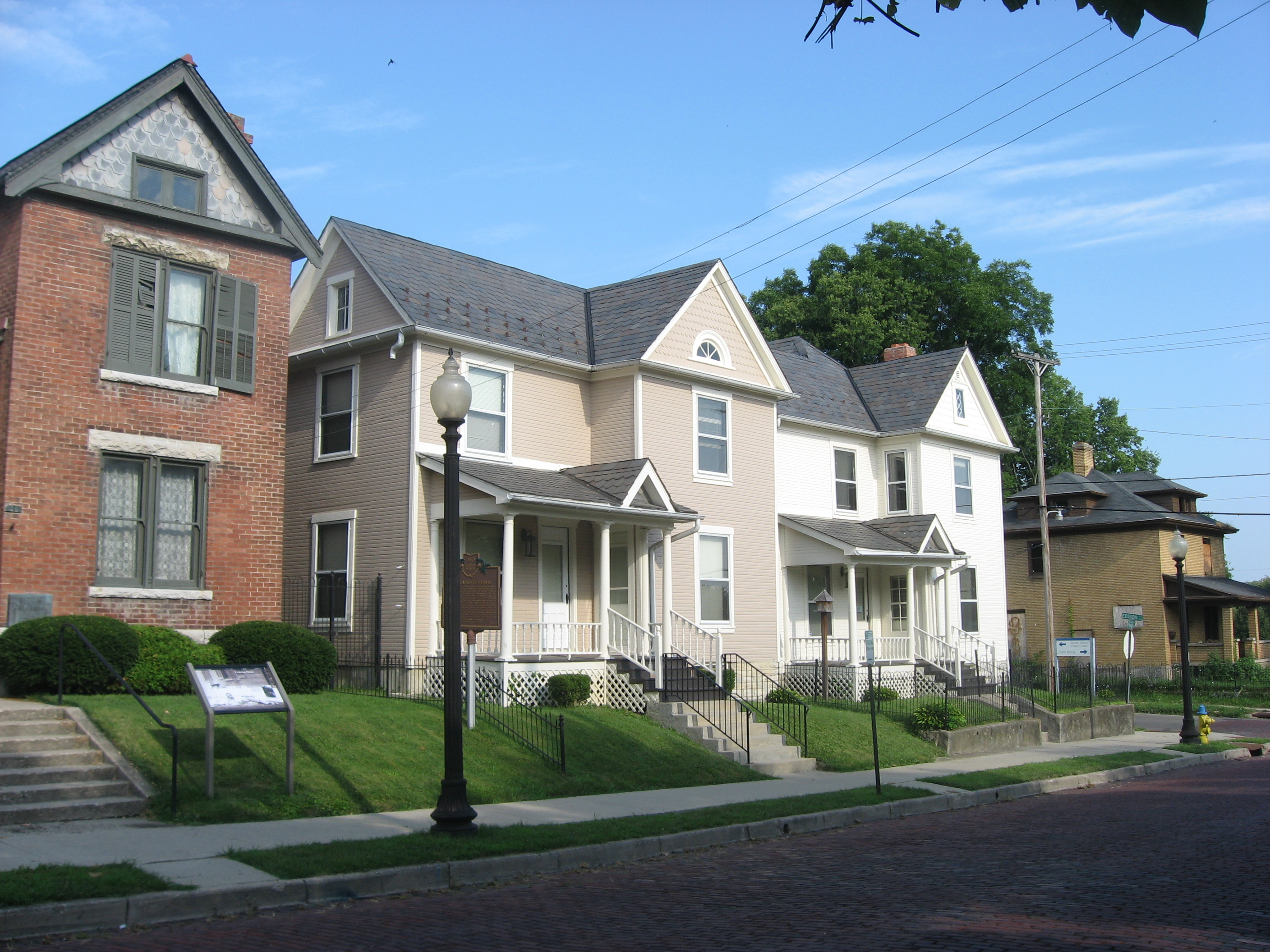
- Dunbar Street in the district

- Location within Ohio Location within the United States
- Location: Dayton, Ohio
- Coordinates: 39°45′23″N 84°13′8″W
- Built: 1870
- Architectural style: Italianate
- NRHP reference No.: 80003174
- Added to NRHP: June 30, 1980

The Dunbar Historic District is a nationally recognized historic district on S Paul Laurence Dunbar Street in Dayton, Ohio. The district is famous for being the home of Paul Laurence Dunbar.

On June 30, 1980, it was added to the National Register of Historic Places

A larger area known as Wright-Dunbar (or Mound-Horace) is bounded roughly by US 35, Broadway Street, West Third Street and the Great Miami River. This district has also been known for housing many ethnic groups such as Hungarians, Romanians, and African Americans. After World War I the Wright-Dunbar area was known as the cultural and commercial center of Dayton's African American community. Many black-owned stores, shops, and theatres gained popularity in Dayton, such as the "Palace Theatre". Decades later, in the 1950s and 1960s, much of the area was damaged during riots, urban renewal, and the construction of Interstate 75. Later, through an effort by the city of Dayton and the county, many of the houses in the district were brought back to life again.
