= Jefferson Township, Ross County, Ohio =

Township in Ohio, US

- Township
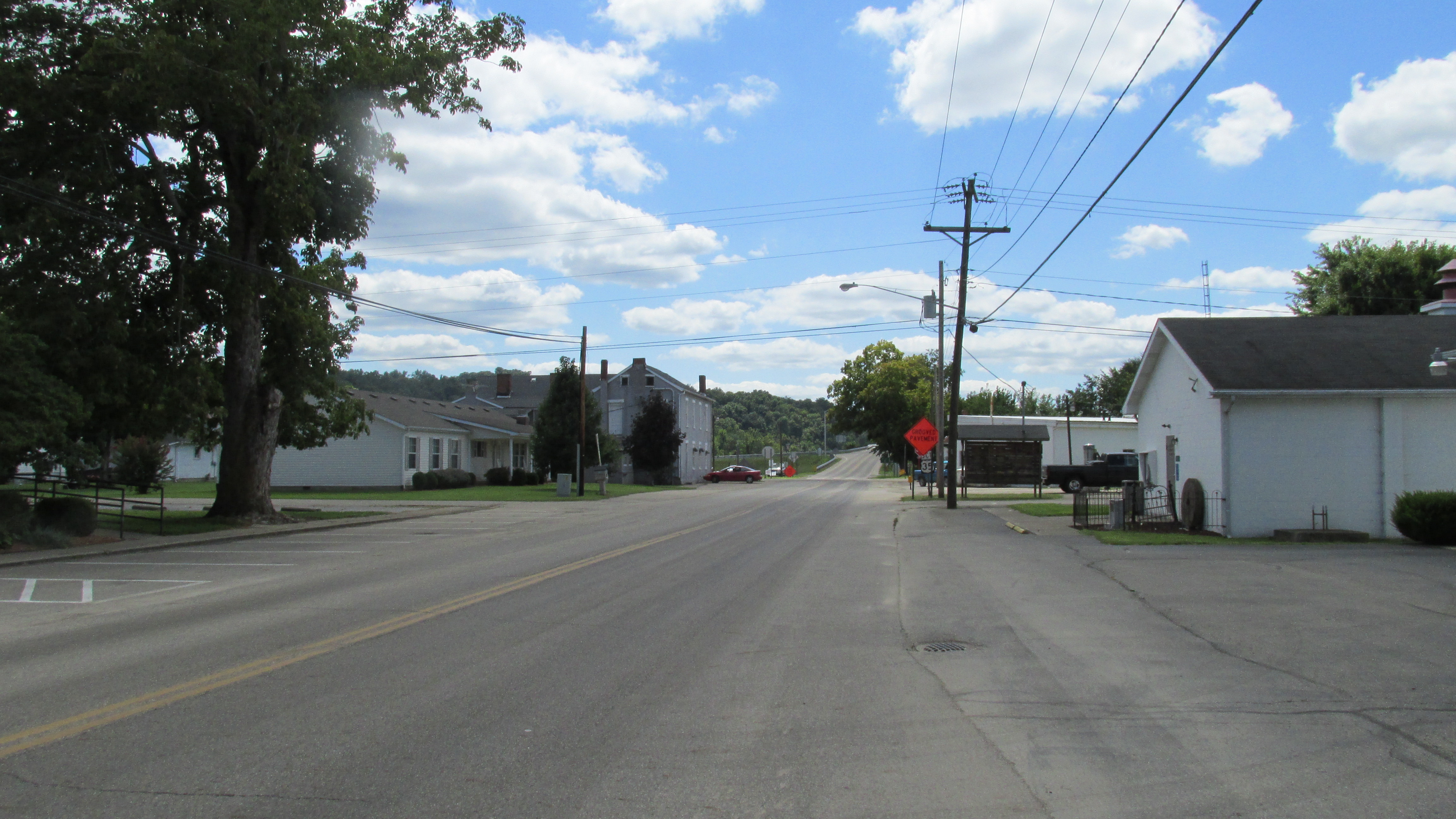
- Street scene in Richmond Dale

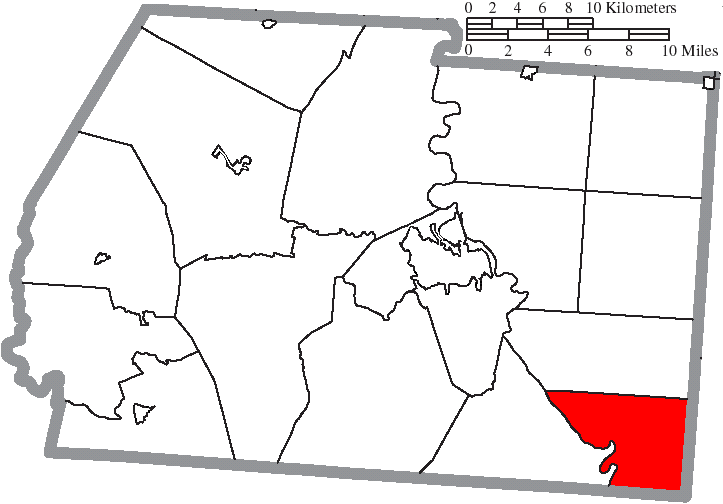
- Location of Jefferson Township in Ross County
- Coordinates: 39°12′22″N 82°48′24″W
- Country: United States
- State: Ohio
- County: Ross

Area
  - Total: 24.9 sq mi (64.4 km^{2})
  - Land: 24.5 sq mi (63.5 km^{2})
  - Water: 0.35 sq mi (0.9 km^{2})
- Elevation: 577 ft (176 m)

Population (2020)
  - Total: 1,064
  - Density: 44/sq mi (16.8/km^{2})
- Time zone: UTC-5 (Eastern (EST))
  - Summer (DST): UTC-4 (EDT)
- FIPS code: 39-38808
- GNIS feature ID: 1086899

Jefferson Township is one of the sixteen townships of Ross County, Ohio, United States. The 2020 census found 1,064 people in the township.

== Geography ==
Located in the southeastern corner of the county, it borders the following townships:

- Liberty Township - north
- Harrison Township, Vinton County - northeast
- Jackson Township, Pike County - southeast
- Jackson Township, Jackson County - southwest
- Franklin Township - west

No municipalities are located in Jefferson Township, although the census-designated place of Richmond Dale lies in the township's center.

== Name and history ==
It is one of twenty-four Jefferson Townships statewide.

== Government ==
The township is governed by a three-member board of trustees, who are elected in November of odd-numbered years to a four-year term beginning on the following January 1. Two are elected in the year after the presidential election and one is elected in the year before it. There is also an elected township fiscal officer, who serves a four-year term beginning on April 1 of the year after the election, which is held in November of the year before the presidential election. Vacancies in the fiscal officership or on the board of trustees are filled by the remaining trustees.
