= Addison Township, Ohio =

Township in Ohio, US

Addison Township, Gallia County, Ohio
- Township
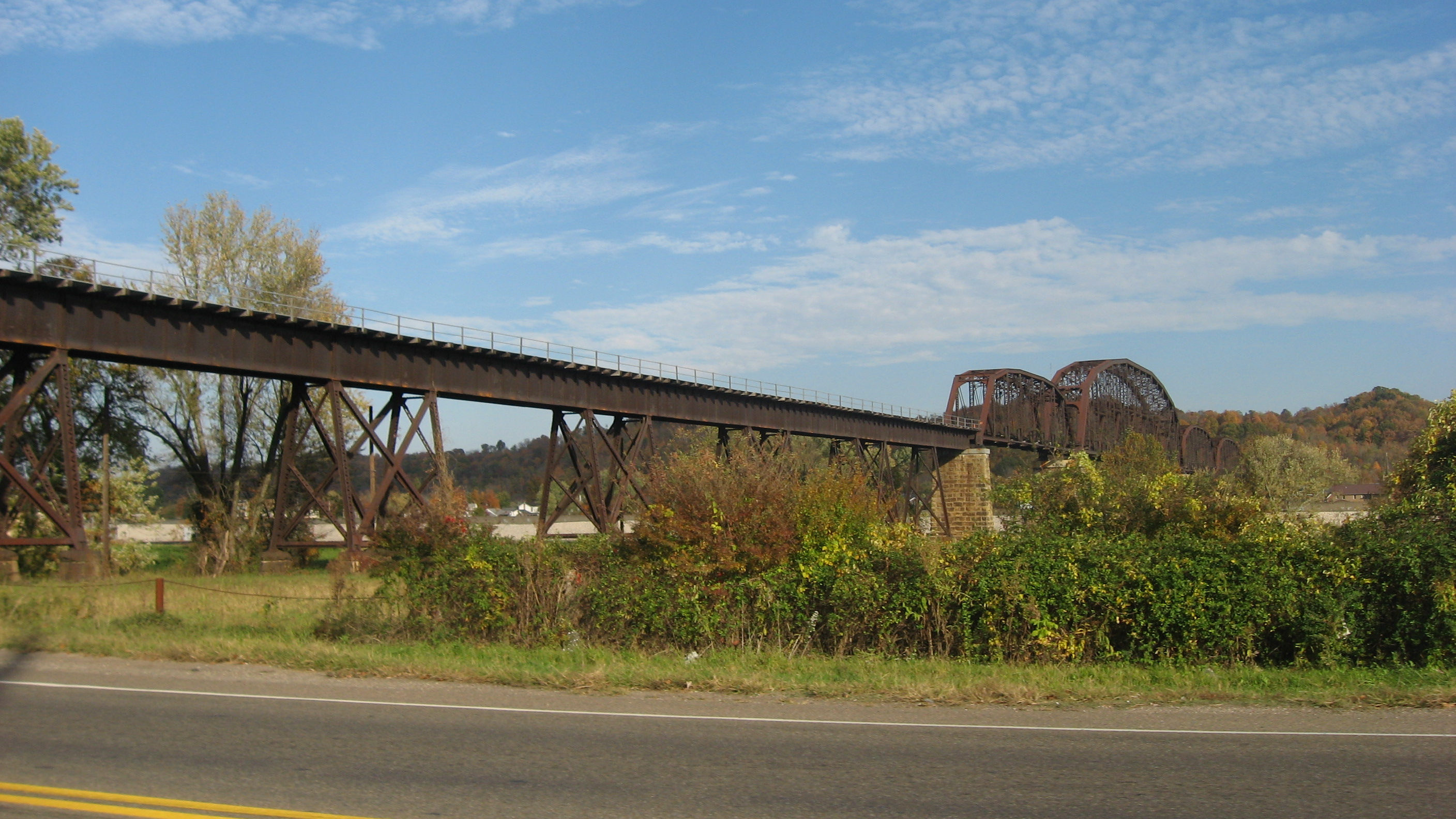
- The Point Pleasant Rail Bridge crossing the Ohio River in the township's southeastern corner

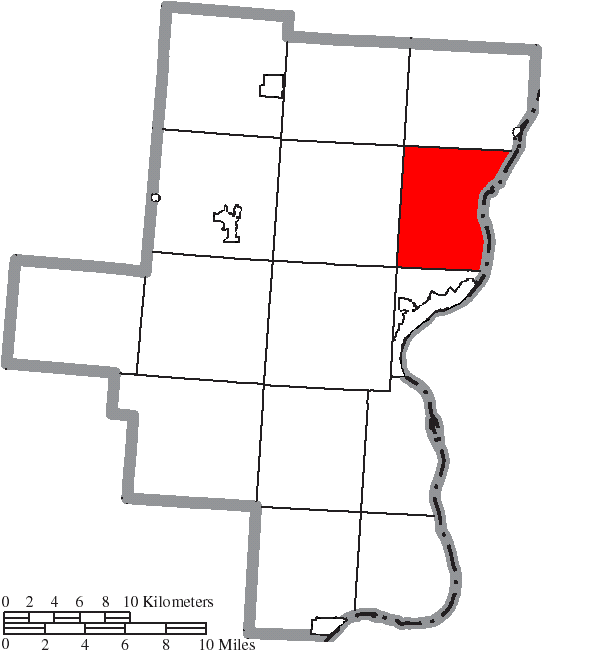
- Location of Addison Township in Gallia County
- Coordinates: 38°53′37″N 82°10′14″W
- Country: United States
- State: Ohio
- County: Gallia

Area
  - Total: 27.6 sq mi (71.4 km^{2})
  - Land: 26.8 sq mi (69.5 km^{2})
  - Water: 0.73 sq mi (1.9 km^{2})
- Elevation: 728 ft (222 m)

Population (2020)
  - Total: 2,160
  - Density: 80.5/sq mi (31.1/km^{2})
- Time zone: UTC-5 (Eastern (EST))
  - Summer (DST): UTC-4 (EDT)
- ZIP code: 45631
- Area code: 740
- FIPS code: 39-00422
- GNIS feature ID: 1086132

Addison Township is one of the fifteen townships of Gallia County, Ohio, United States. As of the 2020 census, the population was 2,160.

== Geography ==
Located in the northeastern part of the county, it is bordered by the following townships:

- Cheshire Township - north
- Gallipolis Township - south
- Green Township - southwest corner
- Springfield Township - west
- Morgan Township - northwest corner

Mason County, West Virginia, lies across the Ohio River to the east.

It is located upstream of four of Gallia County's five other Ohio River townships.

No municipalities are located in Addison Township, although the census-designated place of Kanauga is located the township's southeast corner.

== Name and history ==
It is the only Addison Township statewide.

== Government ==
The township is governed by a three-member board of trustees, who are elected in November of odd-numbered years to a four-year term beginning on the following January 1. Two are elected in the year after the presidential election and one is elected in the year before it. There is also an elected township fiscal officer, who serves a four-year term beginning on April 1 of the year after the election, which is held in November of the year before the presidential election. Vacancies in the fiscal officership or on the board of trustees are filled by the remaining trustees.
