= Drexel, Ohio =

- Census-designated place
- Location in Montgomery County and the state of Ohio
- Coordinates: 39°44′26″N 84°17′24″W
- Country: United States
- State: Ohio
- County: Montgomery
- Township: Jefferson

Area
  - Total: 2.19 sq mi (5.66 km^{2})
  - Land: 2.19 sq mi (5.66 km^{2})
  - Water: 0 sq mi (0.00 km^{2})
- Elevation: 951 ft (290 m)

Population (2020)
  - Total: 1,693
  - Density: 775.1/sq mi (299.26/km^{2})
- Time zone: UTC-5 (Eastern (EST))
  - Summer (DST): UTC-4 (EDT)
- ZIP Code: 45417 (Dayton)
- Area codes: 937, 326
- FIPS code: 39-22624
- GNIS feature ID: 2393399

Drexel is an unincorporated community and census-designated place (CDP) in Jefferson Township, Montgomery County, Ohio, United States. The population was 1,693 at the 2020 census.

== Geography ==
Drexel is in central Montgomery County, in the northeast corner of Jefferson Township. It is bordered to the north by the city of Trotwood and to the east by the city of Dayton. U.S. Route 35 passes through the east part of Drexel as a four-lane highway, then turns west and forms the northern boundary of the community as West Third Street. US 35 leads east 6 miles (10 km) into midtown Dayton and west 18 miles (29 km) to Eaton.

According to the U.S. Census Bureau, the Drexel CDP has a total area of 2.2 square miles (5.7 km^{2}), all land. The community is drained to the south by Opossum Creek, a tributary of the Great Miami River.

== Demographics ==
Historical population
Census	Pop.	Note	%±
1990	5,143		—
2000	2,057		−60.0%
2010	2,076		0.9%
2020	1,693		−18.4%
U.S. Decennial Census

Drexel is part of the Dayton Metropolitan Statistical Area.

As of the census of 2000, there were 2,057 people, 773 households, and 535 families residing in the CDP. The population density was 943.5 inhabitants per square mile (364.3/km^{2}). There were 864 housing units at an average density of 396.3 per square mile (153.0/km^{2}). The racial makeup of the CDP was 61.69% White, 35.05% African American, 0.34% Native American, 0.15% Asian, 0.19% Pacific Islander, 0.24% from other races, and 2.33% from two or more races. Hispanic or Latino of any race were 0.68% of the population.

There were 773 households, out of which 35.3% had children under the age of 18 living with them, 36.2% were married couples living together, 26.1% had a female householder with no husband present, and 30.7% were non-families. 25.1% of all households were made up of individuals, and 10.2% had someone living alone who was 65 years of age or older. The average household size was 2.62 and the average family size was 3.11.

In the CDP the population was spread out, with 31.4% under the age of 18, 9.8% from 18 to 24, 26.3% from 25 to 44, 21.7% from 45 to 64, and 10.7% who were 65 years of age or older. The median age was 32 years. For every 100 females there were 91.2 males. For every 100 females ages 18 and over, there were 84.7 males.

The median income for a household in the CDP was $20,785, and the median income for a family was $21,061. Males had a median income of $28,804 versus $20,952 for females. The per capita income for the CDP was $10,257. About 33.5% of families and 31.5% of the population were below the poverty line, including 38.6% of those under age 18 and 14.1% of those ages 65 or over.
