= Interstate 675 (Ohio) =

Highway in Ohio, United States

Interstate 675
- I-675 highlighted in red

Route information
- Auxiliary route of I-75
- Maintained by ODOT
- Length: 26.53 mi (42.70 km)
- Existed: 1987–present
- NHS: Entire route

Major junctions
- South end: I-75 near Miamisburg
- US 35 in Beavercreek
- North end: I-70 / SR 4 / Clark CR 335 near Fairborn

Location
- Country: United States
- State: Ohio
- Counties: Montgomery, Greene, Clark

Highway system
- Interstate Highway System; Main; Auxiliary; Suffixed; Business; Future; Ohio State Highway System; Interstate; US; State; Scenic
← SR 674	→ SR 675

Interstate 675 (I-675) is an auxiliary Interstate Highway in the suburbs of Dayton in the US state of Ohio. I-675 serves as an eastern bypass of Dayton that is 26.53 miles (42.70 km) long. As originally proposed, the route was to reconnect with I-75 north of Dayton near Northridge rather than going east toward Springfield and I-70 (this was later rejected because part of the right-of-way would have gone through Wright-Patterson Air Force Base). Construction was completed in 1987, though some have lobbied to extend the highway west of Dayton.

== Route description ==
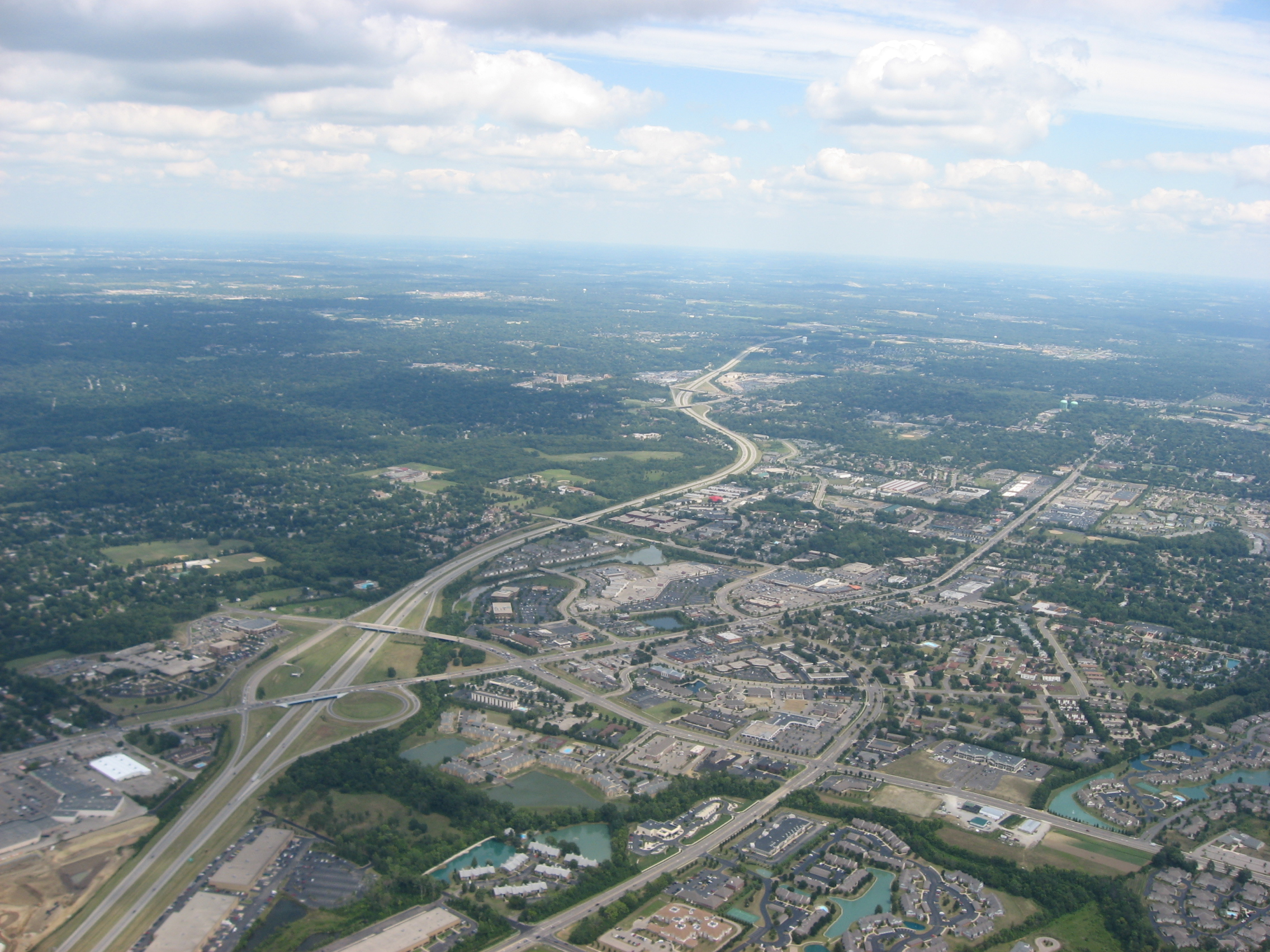
Double interchange on the southern half of I-675

From the south, the highway begins at a semi-directional T interchange with I-75 in Miami Township, with four lanes.

Next, there is a modified split diamond interchange with State Route 725 (SR 725) in Washington Township; ramps to and from the south connect to SR 725, with an additional directional loop ramp from eastbound SR 725 to northbound I-675; ramps to and from the north connect to Yankee Street. Rather than employing a pair of one-way frontage roads typical for this type of interchange, access between SR 725 and Yankee Street is made via Leona Lane or via Yankee Street itself (both two-way streets). After this interchange, the highway opens to six lanes.

The next junction is with SR 48 on the border of unincorporated Washington Township and the city of Centerville. First, there is a half-diamond interchange at West Alexandersville–Bellbrook (Alex–Bell) Road, providing a northbound exit and a southbound entrance. Next, there is a four-ramp partial cloverleaf interchange with SR 48. The loop ramp from northbound I-675 to SR 48 is directional northbound, and there is a directional ramp from southbound SR 48 to southbound I-675; thus, the movements from northbound I-675 to southbound SR 48, and from northbound SR 48 to southbound I-675, are made via Alex–Bell Road.

The next major junction is with US Route 35 (US 35) in Beavercreek, which is a full-access combination interchange; southbound traffic at this interchange uses collector–distributor lanes.

The junction with North Fairfield Road and SR 844 provides access to Wright-Patterson Air Force Base Area A, Wright State University, and the Nutter Center. The configuration is a hybrid diamond interchange, with complete access provided to North Fairfield Road. There is partial direct access provided to SR 844: the exit ramp from northbound I-675 splits, with the right branch meeting North Fairfield Road, while the left branch becomes northbound SR 844 and flies under both I-675 and North Fairfield Road; the entrance ramp from North Fairfield Road to southbound I-675 is offset from its expected position in a diamond interchange, allowing southbound SR 844 to fly under North Fairfield Road and to merge on the entrance ramp's left. Access from southbound I-675 to northbound SR 844, and from southbound SR 844 to northbound I-675, is made indirectly, via North Fairfield Road and Colonel Glenn Highway. The Interstate reduces to four lanes just after this interchange.

The highway has a cloverleaf interchange with I-70 near Fairborn, where it ends. The road continues as two-lane Spangler Road, which leads to the unincorporated community of Medway.

== History ==
Original plans for I-675 in 1962 included a southern terminus at I-75 in Miami Township, and a northern terminus that reconnected to I-75 in Northridge. However, the majority of this original route overlapped with a proposed "Southeast Freeway". As a result, the Bureau of Public Roads refused to approve the plan and the city of Dayton was unable to obtain federal funding. By 1965, plans had been altered to resemble the current route of I-675. Since only 50% of construction was paid for by federal funding, completion of the Interstate was paid for with funds originally designated for freeway development in west Dayton.

Initially designated for completion by 1975, controversies within the Ohio Department of Transportation delayed its finish until 1989. By 1985, the road had been completed to the interchange with SR 844.

== Exit list ==
County	Location	mi	km	Exit	Destinations	Notes
Montgomery	Miamisburg	0.00	0.00	–	I-75 – Cincinnati, Toledo	Southern terminus; I-75 exit 43
Montgomery	Miamisburg	1.64	2.64	2	SR 725 – Miamisburg, Centerville	
Montgomery	Centerville	4.34	6.98	4	SR 48 – Kettering, Centerville	Signed as exits 4A (south) and 4B (north) northbound; northbound exit to southbound SR 48 and southbound entrance from northbound SR 48 via Alex–Bell Road
Montgomery–Greene county line	Centerville–Sugarcreek Township line	6.96	11.20	7	Wilmington Pike – Bellbrook	
Greene	Beavercreek	10.06	16.19	10	Dorothy Lane / Indian Ripple Road – Kettering	
Greene	Beavercreek	12.88	20.73	13	US 35 – Xenia, Dayton	Signed as exits 13A (east) and 13B (west)
Greene	Beavercreek	15.19	24.45	15	Wright-Patterson Air Force Base Area B, Colonel Glenn Highway	
Greene	Fairborn	15.91	25.60	16	Grange Hall Road	Southbound exit and northbound entrance
Greene	Fairborn	17.23	27.73	17	SR 844 north / North Fairfield Road – WPAFB Area A	Southern terminus of SR 844; complete access to North Fairfield Road, northbound exit and southbound entrance only to SR 844
Greene	Fairborn	20.07	32.30	20	Dayton–Yellow Springs Road	
Greene	Fairborn	22.38	36.02	22	SR 235 – Xenia, Fairborn	
Greene–Clark county line	Bath–Mad River township line	24.50	39.43	24	SR 444 – Enon, Fairborn, WPAFB Area A	
Clark	Mad River Township	25.91	41.70	26	I-70 / SR 4 – Springfield, Columbus, Indianapolis	Signed as exits 26A (east) and 26B (west); I-70 exit 44
Clark	Mad River Township	26.43	42.53	–	Spangler Road north – Medway	Northern terminus; roadway continues northward as Spangler Road
1.000 mi = 1.609 km; 1.000 km = 0.621 mi: Incomplete access
