= South Center, Indiana =

- Unincorporated community Census designated place
- Location within Indiana Location within the United States
- Coordinates: 41°28′30″N 86°38′52″W
- Country: United States
- State: Indiana
- County: LaPorte
- Township: Union
- Elevation: 702 ft (214 m)
- ZIP code: 46532
- FIPS code: 18-71072
- GNIS feature ID: 2830445

South Center is an unincorporated community in Union Township, LaPorte County, Indiana. The community is adjacent to the junction of US routes 35 and 6.

== Demographics ==
Historical population
Census	Pop.	Note	%±
2023 (est.)	101

The United States Census Bureau defined South Center as a census designated place in the 2022 American Community Survey.
