= Gallipolis Township, Gallia County, Ohio =

Township in Ohio, US

Gallipolis Township, Ohio
- Township
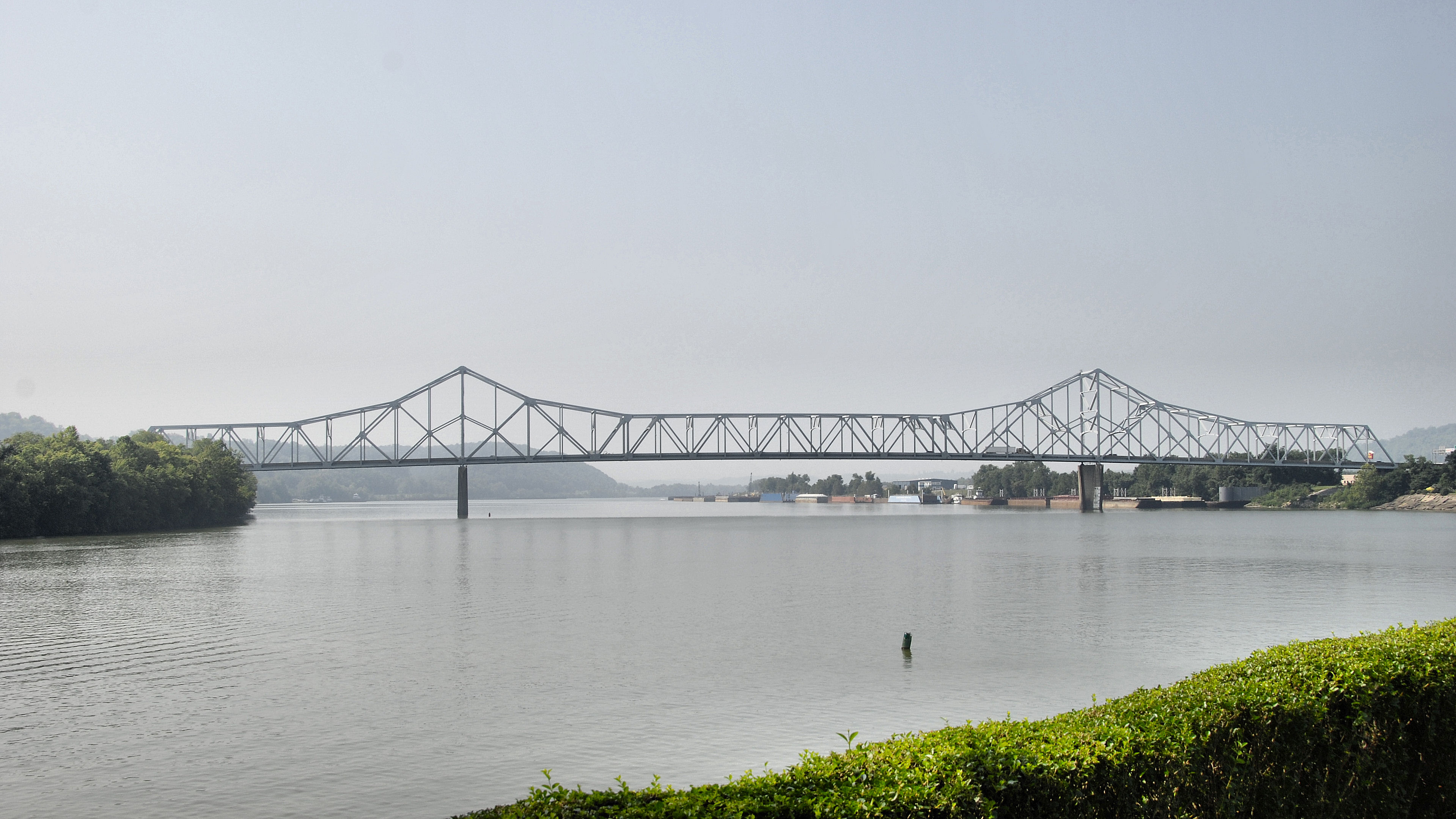
- Silver Memorial Bridge crossing the Ohio River above Gallipolis

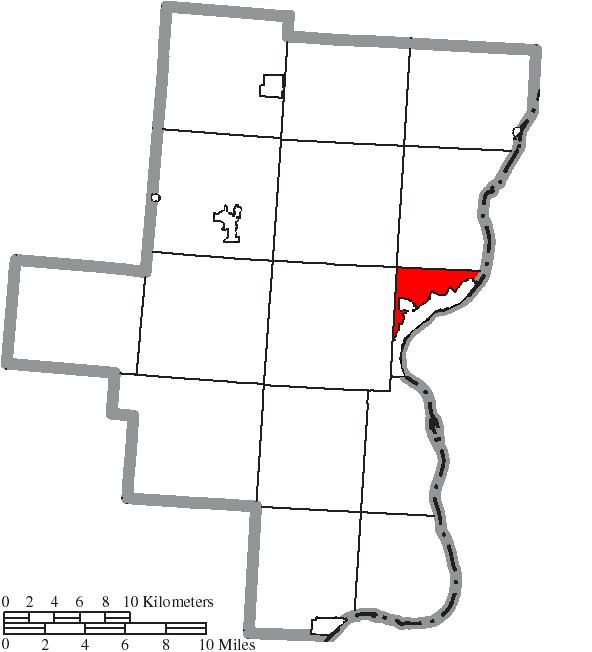
- Location of Gallipolis Township in Gallia County
- Coordinates: 38°49′18″N 82°11′34″W
- Country: United States
- State: Ohio
- County: Gallia

Area
  - Total: 10.4 sq mi (27.0 km^{2})
  - Land: 10.0 sq mi (26.0 km^{2})
  - Water: 0.35 sq mi (0.9 km^{2})
- Elevation: 561 ft (171 m)

Population (2020)
  - Total: 4,725
  - Density: 471/sq mi (182/km^{2})
- Time zone: UTC-5 (Eastern (EST))
  - Summer (DST): UTC-4 (EDT)
- ZIP code: 45631
- Area code: 740
- FIPS code: 39-29218
- GNIS feature ID: 1086135

Gallipolis Township is one of the fifteen townships of Gallia County, Ohio, United States. As of the 2020 census the population was 4,725.

== Geography ==
Located in the eastern part of the county along the Ohio River, it borders the following townships:

- Addison Township – north
- Clay Township – south
- Green Township – west
- Springfield Township – northwest corner

Mason County, West Virginia, lies across the Ohio River to the southeast.

It is located midway between the county's five other Ohio River townships.

The city of Gallipolis, the county seat and largest municipality of Gallia County, occupies most of southern and eastern Gallipolis Township. The census-designated place of Kanauga is located in the township's northwest.

== Name and history ==
It is the only Gallipolis Township statewide. The name Gallipolis combines Latin and Greek words meaning "French city".

== Government ==
The township is governed by a three-member board of trustees, who are elected in November of odd-numbered years to a four-year term beginning on the following January 1. Two are elected in the year after the presidential election and one is elected in the year before it. There is also an elected township fiscal officer, who serves a four-year term beginning on April 1 of the year after the election, which is held in November of the year before the presidential election. Vacancies in the fiscal officership or on the board of trustees are filled by the remaining trustees.
