= Ohio East/Southeast Regions defunct athletic conferences =

This is a list of former high school athletic conferences in the East and Southeast Regions of Ohio, as designated by the OHSAA. If a conference had members that span multiple regions, the conference is placed in the article of the region most of its former members hail from. Because the names of localities and their corresponding high schools do not always match and because there is often a possibility of ambiguity with respect to either the name of a locality or the name of a high school, the following table gives both in every case, with the locality name first, in plain type, and the high school name second in boldface type. The school's team nickname is given last, followed by the school colors listed as (p,s).

== Adams County League ==
The ACL was one of the local small-school county leagues in Southwest Ohio. Consolidation reduced the number of teams to five by 1964, and in 1970 these five joined with the Brown and Highland county leagues to form the Southern Hills Athletic League.

- **Blue Creek** Bluejays (1930s-64, consolidated into West Union)
- Locust Grove **Franklin Township** Panthers (1930s-64, consolidated into Peebles)
- **Jefferson** Eagles (1930s-70, to Southern Hills)
- **Manchester** Greyhounds^{1} (1930s-70, to Tri-County)
- Seaman **North Adams** Green Devils (1964–70, to Southern Hills)
- **Peebles** Indians^{1} (1930s-70, to Tri-County)
- **Seaman** Green Devils (1930s-64, consolidated into North Adams)
- Cherry Fork **Wayne Township** Falcons (1930s-64, consolidated into North Adams)
- **West Union** Dragons (1930s-70, to Southern Hills)
- **Winchester** Rifles (1930s-64, consolidated into North Adams)
1. Manchester and Peebles played concurrently in the ACL and Tri-County League 1964-70.

== Athens County League ==
- **Albany** Red Devils (192?-66, consolidated into Alexander)
- Amesville **Ames-Bern** Greenies (192?-69, consolidated into Federal Hocking)
- **Buchtel-York** Bruins (192?-67, consolidated into Nelsonville-York)
- Coolville **Carthage-Troy** Trojans (192?-67, consolidated into Federal Hocking)
- **Chauncey-Dover** Blue Devils (192?-46, to Southeastern Ohio Buckeye League, 1965–67, consolidated into Athens)
- **Glouster** Tomcats (192?-30, to Muskingum Valley League, 1965–69, to Mid-Ohio Valley Conference)^{1}
- **Jacksonville-Trimble** Cardinals (192?-46, to SEOBL)
- Guysville **Rome-Canaan** Spartans (192?-67, consolidated into Federal Hocking)
- **Shade** Panthers (192?-66, consolidated into Alexander)
- **The Plains** Indians (192?-46, to SEOBL, 1965–67, consolidated into Athens)
- New Marshfield **Waterloo** Rockets (192?-66, consolidated into Alexander)
- **Carbon Hill** Bulldogs (1962–67, consolidated into Nelsonville-York)
- **Murray City** Tigers (1962–67, consolidated into Nelsonville-York)
- Albany **Alexander** Spartans (1966–69, to MOVC)^{1}
- Stewart **Federal Hocking** Lancers (1967–69, to Tri-Valley Conference)
1. Concurrent with MOVC 1965-69 (or 1966-69 for Alexander).

== Belmont County League ==
"A" Division

- **Barnesville** Shamrocks (192?-59, to Ohio Valley Athletic Conference)^{4}
- **Bellaire** Big Reds (192?-59, to OVAC)^{1}
- **Bridgeport** Bulldogs(192?-59, to OVAC)^{2}
- **Martins Ferry** Purple Riders (192?-59, to OVAC)^{1}
- **St. Clairsville** Red Devils (192?-59, to OVAC)^{3}
- **Shadyside** Tigers (192?-59, to OVAC)^{1}

"B" Division

- **Belmont** Eagles (192?-59, consolidated into Union Local)
- **Bethesda** Panthers(192?-59, consolidated into Union Local)
- **Centerville** Rams(192?-59, consolidated into Union Local)
- **Flushing** Orioles (192?-68, consolidated into Union Local)
- **Holloway** Railroaders (192?-59, consolidated into Union Local)
- **Lafferty** Scarlet Scourge (192?-59, consolidated into Union Local)
- **Powhatan Point** Indians (192?-69, consolidated into River)^{1}
- **Randolph?** Rangers (192?-59, consolidated into Union Local)
- Bellaire **St. John Central** Irish (192?-59, to OVAC)^{1}
- Martins Ferry **St. Mary's** Saints (192?-55, consolidated into St. John Central)
- Lafferty **Seton Central** Saints (1964–71, to OVAC)
1. Concurrent with OVAC 1943-59.
2. Concurrent with OVAC 1946-59.
3. Concurrent with OVAC 1947-59.
4. Concurrent with OVAC 1953-59.

== Buckeye Border Conference (East) ==
This was a conference located in far eastern Ohio, with many schools who maintained membership in the Ohio Valley Athletic Conference. This conference should not be confused with the Northwest Ohio league of the same name.

- Lisbon **Beaver** Fighting Beavers (1961–74, to Tri-County Conference (Northeast))
- **Carrollton** Warriors (1961–74, to Senate League)
- Richmond **Jefferson Union** Yellow Jackets (1961–74, to Ohio Valley Athletic Conference)
- **Shadyside** Tigers (1961–74, to OVAC)^{1}
- **Smithfield** Spartans (1961–72, consolidated into Buckeye North)^{1}
- Salineville **Southern** Indians (1961–74, to TCC)
- **Steubenville Central Catholic** Crusaders (1961–74, to OVAC)^{1}
- **Toronto** Red Knights (1961–74, to TCC)
- **Wellsville** Tigers (1961–74, to TCC)^{2}
- Hanoverton **United** Eagles (1964–72, to TCC)
- Hammondsville **Stanton** Red Raiders (1968–74, to TCC)^{1}
1. Concurrent with OVAC throughout tenure in conference.
2. Concurrent with OVAC 1973-74.

== Cardinal Conference ==
- **Ashland** Arrows (1960–1987, to Ohio Heartland)
- **Dover** Tornadoes (1960–1987, to Northeastern Buckeye in 1989)
- Mansfield **Madison** Rams (1960–1987, to Ohio Heartland)
- **Wooster** Generals (1960–1987, to Federal)
- **Coshocton** Redskins (1961–1987, to East Central Ohio)
- Mansfield **Malabar** Falcons (1961–1981, consolidated into Mansfield)
- **New Philadelphia** Quakers (1961–1987, to Federal)

Note: The Ohio Cardinal Conference was created in 2003 to preserve the legacy of the former Cardinal Conference.

== Carroll County League ==
One of the smallest county conferences, the CCL lasted until two of its members consolidated in 1962, while the other two schools had been playing in other leagues concurrently with the CCL.

- **Augusta** Blue Devils (192?-64, consolidated into Carrollton)
- **Dellroy** Cowboys (-1950) Blue Jets (1950–62) (192?-62, consolidated into Carrollton)
- **Malvern** Hornets^{1} (192?-64, to Tuscarawas Valley Athletic Conference)
- **Sherrodsville** Wildcats (192?-50, consolidated into Conotton Valley)
- Bowerston^{2} **Conotton Valley** Rockets^{3} (1950–71, to Harrison County League and Tuscarawas Valley Conference)
1. Concurrent with TVC 1960-62.
2. Mailing address is Bowerston, in Harrison County, physical location is in Leesville.
3. Concurrent with HCL 1950-71, concurrent in HCL and TVC (football conference only) 1960-66.

== Coshocton County League ==
- **Conesville** Vikings (192?-61, consolidated into Three Rivers)
- **Fresno** Indians (192?-64, consolidated into Ridgewood)
- **Keene** Cardinals (192?-61, consolidated into Three Rivers)
- **Plainfield** Panthers (192?-64, consolidated into Ridgewood)
- **Roscoe** Tigers (192?-61, consolidated into Three Rivers)
- Coshocton **Sacred Heart** Hilltoppers (192?-38)
- Roscoe **Three Rivers** Patriots^{1} (1961–65, consolidated into River View)
- Tunnel Hill **Union** Trojans (192?-65, consolidated into River View)
- **Warsaw** Pirates (192?-65, consolidated into River View)
- **West Lafayette** Generals (192?-64, consolidated into Ridgewood)
1. Concurrent with Scenic Hills Athletic Conference 1964-65.

== East Central Ohio League (old) ==
This early incarnation of the ECOL functioned mostly as a football league and secondary league for schools who also participated in local county leagues. The conference would never find its legs, as it spent its last eight years with only four members.

- **Cadiz** Cardinals (1949–52, never belonged to Harrison County League)^{1}
- **Carrollton** Warriors (1949–60, to Buckeye Border Conference (East) 1961)
- **Dennison** Railroaders (1949–60, to Tuscarawas Valley Athletic Conference)^{2}
- **Newcomerstown** Trojans (1949–60, never belonged to Tuscarawas County League)^{2}
- **Uhrichsville** Tigers (1949–60, never belonged to TVAC)^{2}
1. Concurrent with HCL 1949-52.
2. Concurrent with TCL 1949-60.

== East Central Ohio League (new) ==
- Zanesville **Bishop Rosecrans** Bishops (2011-2017)
- **Cambridge** Bobcats (1987-2021)
- Uhrichsville **Claymont** Mustangs (1989-2016)
- **Coshocton** Redskins (1987-2020)
- **Dover** Tornadoes (1993-2022)
- Gnadenhutten **Indian Valley** Braves (1996-2007)
- **Marietta** Tigers (2011-2022)
- Byesville **Meadowbrook** Colts (1987-2020)
- **New Philadelphia** Quakers (1997-2022)
- Warsaw **River View** Black Bears (2005-2020)
- **St. Clairsville** Red Devils (1987–1996)
- Vincent **Warren** Warriors (2020-2022)
- **Zanesville** Blue Devils (2011-2020)

Division alignments (2011–17)

- Gray: Bishop Rosecrans (2011–17), Claymont (2011–16), Coshocton, Meadowbrook, River View
- Scarlet: Cambridge, Dover, Marietta, New Philadelphia, Zanesville

== Fairfield County League ==
This league had many members concurrently with the Mid-State League, and ended when Pickerington, the last remaining non-MSL member, joined the MSL in 1966.

- **Amanda-Clearcreek** Aces^{4} (Amanda Black Aces before 1960, 192?-66, to MSL)
- **Carroll** Bulldogs^{4} (192?-66, to MSL)
- **Clearport** Cougars (192?-35, consolidated into Amanda)
- **Crawfis** Rangers (192?-30, consolidated into Berne Union)
- Baltimore **Liberty Union** Lions^{1} (192?-66, to MSL)
- **Millersport** Lakers^{3} (192?-66, to MSL)
- **Pickerington** Tigers (192?-66, to MSL)
- **Pleasantville** Panthers (192?-57, consolidated into Fairfield Union)
- Bremen **Rushcreek Memorial** Oilers (192?-62, consolidated into Fairfield Union)
- **Rushville** Cardinals (192?-57, consolidated into Fairfield Union)
- **Stoutsville** Indians (192?-60, consolidated into Amanda-Clearcreek)
- **Sugar Grove** Bees (192?-30, consolidated into Berne Union)
- **Thurston** Red Devils (192?-60, consolidated into Liberty Union)
- Sugar Grove **Berne Union** Rockets^{2} (1930–66, to MSL)
- Rushville **Fairfield Union** Falcons^{3} (1957–66, to MSL)
1. concurrent in FCL and MSL 1949-66.
2. concurrent in FCL and MSL 1953-66.
3. concurrent in FCL and MSL 1957-66.
4. concurrent in FCL and MSL 1958-66.

== Fayette County League ==
This small league contained all of the county schools outside of Washington Court House. New Holland, which sits on the border between Fayette and Pickaway Counties, played in the Pickaway County League until moving to the FCL in 1958 for its final two seasons.

- **Bloomingburg** Bulldogs (1930s-60, consolidated into Miami Trace)
- **Jeffersonville** Tigers (1930s-60, consolidated into Miami Trace)
- **Madison Mills** Warriors (Millers before 1950) (1930s-60, consolidated into Miami Trace)
- Good Hope **Wayne** Mad Anthonies (1930s-60, consolidated into Miami Trace)
- **New Holland** Bulldogs (1958–60, to Pickaway County League)

== Guernsey County League ==
- **Buffalo** Bison (19??-64, consolidated into Meadowbrook)
- **Byesville** Falcons (19??-64, consolidated into Meadowbrook)
- Robins **Community** Bulldogs (19??-51, consolidated into Byesville)
- **Cumberland** Vikings (19??-64, consolidated into Meadowbrook)
- **Lore City** Bearcats (19??-60, consolidated into Madison)
- Antrim **Madison** Eagles (19??-77, consolidated into Buckeye Trail)
- **Old Washington** Cardinals (19??-64, consolidated into Zane Trace)
- **Pleasant City** Tigers (19??-64, consolidated into Meadowbrook)
- **Quaker City** Quakers (19??-64, consolidated into Zane Trace)
- **Senecaville** Indians (19??-60, consolidated into Pleasant City)
- Byesville **Meadowbrook** Colts (1964–77, to Ohio Valley Athletic Conference)^{1}
- Old Washington **Zane Trace** Warriors (1964–77, consolidated into Buckeye Trail)
1. Concurrent with OVAC 1972-77.

== Harrison County League ==
- **Bowerston** Trojans (1929–50, consolidated into Conotton Valley)
- **Cadiz** Cardinals^{1} (1926- EOAL; 1956–71, to Ohio Valley Athletic Conference)
- New Athens **Franklin** Bobcats (1929–71, consolidated into Cadiz, non-affiliated 1913-1929)
- **Hopedale** Comets (1929–71, consolidated into Cadiz, non-affiliated 1916-1929)
- **Jewett** Wildcats (1929–71, consolidated into Jewett-Scio)
- Freeport **Lakeland** Red Raiders (1929–99, Freeport Red Raiders before 1961-2, Harrison County League 1929-71, to Inter-Valley Conference 1974-99)
- **Scio** Panthers (1929–71, consolidated into Jewett-Scio, non-affiliated 1913?-1929)
- **Tippecanoe** school colors: scarlet and grey (1930–48) member of HCL for one season only 1934-5, three-year high school, no nickname.
- Bowerston **Conotton Valley** Rockets^{2} (1950–71)
- **Jewett-Scio** Vikings (1971–74 independent, to Inter-Valley Conference 1974-99)
1. Concurrent with OVAC 1956-99.
2. Concurrent with Carroll County League 1956-62, and Tuscarawas Valley Athletic Conference 1960-68.

Harrison County League (basketball) formed in 1929 to 1971.

== Highland County League ==
The HCL was one of the local small-school county leagues in Southwest Ohio. The league had eight schools for most of its history, but consolidation chipped away at its membership total. League membership had been reduced to three by 1969, and these teams struggled on for a year until the creation of the Southern Hills Athletic League, which saw the three combine with the Adams and Brown county leagues, who had five teams apiece at that point.

- **Belfast** Hornets (1924–69, consolidated into Whiteoak)
- **Buford** Bulldogs (1924–66, consolidated into Lynchburg-Clay)
- Leesburg **Fairfield** Lions (1924–70, to Southern Hills)
- **Lynchburg-Clay** Mustangs (1924–70, Lynchburg until 1966, to Southern Hills)
- **Marshall** Red Flashes (1924–60, consolidated into Hillsboro)
- **Rainsboro** Panthers (1924–68, consolidated into McClain)
- **Sinking Spring** Eagles (1924–68, consolidated into North Adams)
- Mowrystown **Whiteoak** Wildcats (1924–70, to Southern Hills)

== Holmes County League ==
- **Berlin** Blue Jays (192?-58, consolidated into Hiland)
- Charm **Clark** Colts (192?-59, consolidated into Hiland)
- **Killbuck** Bucks (192?-64, consolidated into West Holmes
- **Holmesville** Polar Bears (192?-55, consolidated into Waynedale)
- **Lakeville** Panthers (192?-52, consolidated into Big Prairie-Lakeville)
- **Millersburg** Spartans (192?-64, consolidated into West Holmes)
- **Nashville** Tigers (192?-61, consolidated into Millersburg)
- **Walnut Creek** Cardinals (192?-58, consolidated into Hiland)
- **Big Prairie-Lakeville** Bulldogs (1937–64, Big Prairie before 1952, consolidated into West Holmes)
- Berlin **Hiland** Hawks (1958–64, to Inter-Valley Conference 1968)

== Hocking County League ==
This was one of the few county leagues that folded while still having enough members for competition, as the four schools left for different leagues.

- **Carbon Hill** Bulldogs (192?-62, to Athens County League)
- **Gibsonville** Tigers (192?-60, consolidated into Logan)
- **Haydensville** Hawks (192?-34, consolidated into Logan)
- **Ilesboro** Eagles (192?-34, consolidated into Union Furnace)
- **Laurelville** Wildcats (192?-62, to Scioto Valley Conference)
- **Murray City** Miners (192?-62, to Athens County League)
- **Rockbridge** Red Raiders (192?-60, consolidated into Logan)
- **South Bloomingville** Dodgers (192?-60, consolidated into Logan)
- **Union Furnace** Warriors (192?-62, to Southern Valley Athletic League)

== Jackson County League ==
- **Bloomfield** Falcons (192?-47, consolidated into Oak Hill)
- **Coalton** Vikings (192?-54, to Gallia County League)
- **Oak Hill** Oaks (192?-54, to Ohio Valley Conference)
- Petersburg **Scioto Township** Spartans (192?-54, consolidated into Jackson)
- Garfield **Washington Township** Warriors (192?-47, consolidated into Wellston)
- **Wellston** Golden Rockets^{1} (192?-54, to Southeast Ohio Athletic League)
1. Concurrent with SEOAL 1925-54.

== Lawrence County League ==
- **Blackfork** Bobcats (192?-47, consolidated into Oak Hill)
- **Chesapeake** Panthers (192?-48, to Southern Ohio Conference)
- Coal Grove **Dawson-Bryant** Hornets^{1} (192?-57, to Ohio Valley Conference)
- Vernon **Decatur-Washington** Warriors (192?-62, school closed 1964)
- Proctorville **Fairland** Dragons (1949–57, to Ohio Valley Conference)
- **Hanging Rock** Rockets (192?-50, consolidated into Rock Hill)
- **Kitts Hill** Toppers (192?-50, consolidated into Rock Hill)
- Aid **Mason-Aid** Green Wave (192?-61, consolidated into Symmes Valley)
- **Pedro** Redmen (192?-50, consolidated into Rock Hill)
- Pedro **Rock Hill** Redmen^{1} (1950–57, to Ohio Valley Conference)
- **Proctorville** Red Raiders (192?-49, consolidated into Fairland)
- **Rome** Romans (1925–49, consolidated into Fairland)
- Ironton **St. Joseph Central** Flyers (192?-62, to Ohio Valley Conference)
- **South Point** Pointers^{1} (192?-57, to Ohio Valley Conference)
- **Waterloo** "Little Generals" Wonders (192?-61, consolidated into Symmes Valley)
- Willow Wood **Windsor** Dukes (192?-61, consolidated into Symmes Valley)
- Willow Wood **Symmes Valley** Vikings (1961–62, to Ohio Valley Conference)
1. Concurrent with OVC 1954-57.

== Meigs County League ==
- **Chester** Raiders (192?-61, consolidated into Eastern)
- Harrisonville **Northwestern** Bulldogs (192?-67, Harrisonville before 1961, consolidated into Meigs)
- Tuppers Plains **Olive-Orange** Wildcats (192?-61, consolidated into Eastern)
- **Rutland** Red Devils (192?-67, consolidated into Meigs)^{1}
- Racine **Southern** Tornadoes^{1, 2} (192?-67, Racine until 1961, to Southern Valley Athletic Conference)
- Reedsville **Eastern** Eagles^{1, 2} (1961–67, to SVAC)
1. Concurrent with Mid-Ohio Valley Conference 1965-67.
2. Concurrent with SVAC 1961-67.

== Mid-Ohio Valley Conference ==
This short-lived bridge conference should not be confused with what would eventually become the Pioneer Valley League. While both leagues used the Mid-Ohio Valley name at the same time, this operated more in the Southeast Region, while the eventual PVL more closely aligned with the East Region. All schools in this conference were eventually members of the TVC by either joining after leaving the Mid-Ohio Valley Conference or by consolidating into a school that eventually joined. Glouster, McArthur, and Rutland all joined by consolidating into Trimble, Vinton County, and Meigs. All members are still currently in the TVC except Miller and Wahama, who both left following the 2019-2020 school year.

- Reedsville **Eastern** Eagles (1965–71, to Southern Valley Athletic Conference)^{1, 2}
- **Glouster** Tomcats (1965–71, to TVC 1978 as Glouster **Trimble**)^{3}
- **McArthur** Generals (1965–66, consolidated into Vinton County High School)^{4}
- **Rutland** Red Devils (1965–67, consolidated into Meigs)^{1}
- Racine **Southern** Tornadoes (1965–69, to SVAC)^{1, 2}
- Mason (WV) **Wahama** White Buffaloes (1965–69; nickname now White Falcons)
- Albany **Alexander** Spartans (1966–71, to TVC 1973)^{3}
- McArthur **Vinton County** Vikings (1966–69, to TVC)
- Corning **Miller** Falcons (1968–71, to TVC 1983)
1. Concurrent with Meigs County League 1965-67.
2. Concurrent with SVAC for entire duration in conference.
3. Concurrent with Athens County League from joining MOVC until 1969.
4. Concurrent with Vinton County League 1965-66.

== Monroe County League ==
- **Beallsville** Blue Devils (192?-64, to Ohio Valley Athletic Conference)
- Marr **Bethel** Blackhawks (192?-58, consolidated into Skyvue)
- **Clarington** River Rats (192?-54, consolidated into River)
- **Graysville** Giants (192?-58, consolidated into Skyvue)
- **Hannibal** Hornets (192?-54, consolidated into River)
- **Laings** Eagles (192?-54, consolidated into River)
- **Lewisville** Lions (192?-58, consolidated into Skyvue)
- Antioch **Perry** Panthers (192?-52, consolidated into Graysville)
- **Rinard Mills** Raiders (192?-52, consolidated into Graysville)
- **Sardis** Ridge Runners? (192?-54, consolidated into River)
- **Stafford** Spartans (192?-52, consolidated into Lewisville)
- **Woodsfield** Redskins (192?-64, to Ohio Valley Athletic Conference)
- Hannibal **River** Pilots^{1} (1954–64, to Ohio Valley Athletic Conference)
- Graysville **Skyvue** Golden Hawks (1958–64, to Frontier Valley Conference)
1. Concurrent with OVAC 1958-64.

== Morgan County League ==
- **Chesterhill** Blue Devils (19??-66, consolidated into Morgan)
- **Deavertown** Tigers (19??-66, consolidated into Morgan)
- **Malta** Reds (19??-31, consolidated into Malta-McConnellsville)
- **McConnellsville** Raiders (19??-30, to Muskingum Valley League)
- **Mountville** Panthers (19??-58, consolidated into Malta-McConnellsville)
- **Pennsville** Dragons (19??-58, consolidated into Stockport)
- **Reinersville** Roosters (19??-58, consolidated into Malta-McConnellsville)
- **Stockport** Indians (19??-66, consolidated into Morgan)

== Muskingum County League ==
- **Adamsville** Wildcats (192?-66, consolidated into Tri-Valley)
- **Chandlersville** Comets (Cavaliers before 1950) (192?-66, consolidated into Philo)
- **Frazeysburg** Red Raiders (192?-66, consolidated into Tri-Valley)
- Dresden **Jefferson** Jayhawks (192?-50, to Muskingum Valley League)
- South Zanesville **Maysville** Panthers^{1} (South Zanesville before 1957) (192?-66, to Muskingum Valley)
- **New Concord** Little Muskies (192?-30, to Muskingum Valley League)
- Duncan Falls **Philo** Electrics (192?-38, to Muskingum Valley League)
- Hopewell **West Muskingum** Tornadoes (Hopewell before 1962) (192?-66, to Muskingum Valley League)
1. Concurrent with MCL and MVL 1963-66.

== Noble County League ==
- **Batesville** Beavers (192?-63, consolidated into Shenandoah)
- **Belle Valley** Purple Riders (192?-63, consolidated into Shenandoah)
- **Caldwell** Redskins (192?-33, to Muskingum Valley League)
- Dexter City **Southern Noble** Tigers (192?-64, Dexter City before 1956, consolidated into Caldwell)
- Three Forks **Forest Grove** Foresters (192?-55, consolidated into Belle Valley)
- **Harriettsville** Elks (192?-64, consolidated into Skyvue)
- **Sarahsville** Red Devils (192?-63, consolidated into Shenandoah)
- Marion **Summerfield** Golden Gophers (192?-63, consolidated into Shenandoah)
- Sarahsville **Shenandoah** Zeps (1963–64, to Mid-Ohio Valley Conference 1966)

== Ohio-Kentucky Athletic Conference ==
- Ashland (KY) **Blazer** Tomcats (1986–94)
- Cannonsburg (KY) **Boyd County** Lions (1986–94)
- Greenup (KY) **Greenup County** Musketeers (1986–94)
- **Ironton** Tigers (1986–94)
- **Portsmouth** Trojans (1986–94)
- **Russell** (KY) Red Devils (1986–94)

== Perry County League ==
Originally a 12-school conference encompassing all Perry County schools, the league settled into a stable, nine school league as the independent schools moved to the Muskingum Valley League. This was abruptly changed in 1960, as consolidation dropped the number from nine to two new consolidated schools.

- **Corning** Railroaders (192?-61, consolidated into Miller)
- **Crooksville** Ceramics (192?-30, to Muskingum Valley League)
- **Glenford** Golden Horde (192?-60, consolidated into Sheridan)
- **Junction City** Wildcats (192?-61, consolidated into New Lexington)
- **McLuney** Wildcats (192?-61, consolidated into Crooksville)
- **Moxahala** Bobcats (192?-61, consolidated into Miller)
- **New Lexington** Panthers (192?-30, to Muskingum Valley)
- **New Straitsville** Big Red (192?-60, consolidated into Shawnee-New Straitsville)
- **Roseville** Ramblers (192?-44, to Muskingum Valley League)
- Shawnee **Shawnee-New Straitsville** Indians (Shawnee before 1960) (192?-61, consolidated into Miller)
- **Somerset** Raiders (192?-60, consolidated into Sheridan)
- **Thornville** Rams (192?-60, consolidated into Sheridan)
- Thornville **Sheridan** Generals (1960–61, to Muskingum Valley League 1966)

== Pickaway County League ==
Another of the old County leagues for smaller schools, the league suffered from the rapid consolidation of schools in Pickaway County in the early 1960s. The league went from eleven schools in 1959 to four in 1963, with those four consolidating that next year.

- **Ashville-Harrison** Broncos (pre-1935-62, Ashville before 1949, consolidated into Teays Valley)
- Derby **Darby** Trojans (pre-1935-64, consolidated into Westfall)
- Little Walnut **Jackson** Wildcats (pre-1935-64, consolidated into Westfall)
- Five Points **Monroe** Indians (pre-1935-60, consolidated into Westfall)
- **New Holland** Bulldogs (pre-1935-58, to Fayette County League, 1960–62, consolidated into Miami Trace)
- Atlanta **Perry** Cruisers (pre-1935-64, consolidated into Westfall)
- Haysville **Pickaway** Pirates (pre-1935-60, consolidated into Logan Elm)
- Tarlton **Salt Creek** Warriors (pre-1935-60, consolidated into Logan Elm)
- Commercial Point **Scioto** Buffaloes (pre-1935-62, consolidated into Teays Valley)
- **South Bloomfield** Spartans (pre-1935-49, consolidated into Ashville-Harrison)
- Ringgold **Walnut** Tigers (pre-1935-62, consolidated into Teays Valley)
- Stoutsville **Washington Township** Cardinals(?) (pre-1935-49, consolidated into Pickaway)
- **Williamsport** Deer (pre-1935-64, consolidated into Westfall)

== Pioneer Valley Conference ==
The PVC originally formed in 1964 as the Frontier Valley Conference, then became the Mid-Ohio Valley Conference in 1966 to avoid confusion with the newly consolidated Frontier Local School District. The conference settled on its current moniker in 1976 before dissolving in 2019.

- **Caldwell** Redskins (1964-2019)
- Beverly **Fort Frye** Cadets (1964-2019)
- **Lawrence** Golden Eagles (1964–68, consolidated into Frontier)
- **New Matamoras** Bulldogs (1964–68, consolidated into Frontier)
- **Newport** Trojans (1964–68, consolidated into Frontier)
- Marietta **St. Mary Central Catholic** Irish (1964–65)
- Lower Salem **Salem-Liberty** Cardinals (1964–66, consolidated into Fort Frye)
- Graysville **Skyvue** Golden Hawks (1964–94, consolidated into Monroe Central)
- **Waterford** Wildcats (1964–97, left for Tri-Valley Conference)
- Sarahsville **Shenandoah** Zeps (1966-2019)
- New Matamoras **Frontier** Cougars (1968-2019, left for Mid-Ohio Valley League)
- **Beallsville** Blue Devils (1976-2005, left for River Valley Conference)
- **Woodsfield** Redskins (1976–94, consolidated into Monroe Central)
- Woodsfield **Monroe Central** Seminoles (1994-2019, left for Mid-Ohio Valley League)
- Lore City **Buckeye Trail** Warriors (1997-2017)
- Hannibal **River** Pilots (2005-2014)

== River Valley Conference ==
This was a short-lived conference in the 1990s to help some Ohio Valley Athletic Conference teams with scheduling.

- Lisbon **Beaver** Beavers (1990–99)
- Rayland **Buckeye** Panthers (1990–99)
- **East Liverpool** Potters (1990–99)
- Hammondsville **Edison North** Wildcats (1990–93, consolidated into Edison)
- Richmond **Edison** Wildcats (1990–99, Edison South before 1993)
- New Cumberland (WV) **Oak Glen** Golden Bears (1990–99)
- Weirton (WV) **Weir** Red Raiders (1990–99)
- **Wintersville** Golden Warriors (1990–93, consolidated into Indian Creek)
- Wintersville **Indian Creek** Redskins (1993–99)

== Ross County League ==
Another County League that folded despite having ample competition, the league ended when the remaining members who weren't already affiliated with the Scioto Valley League members joined that conference in 1975.

- **Adelphi** Eagles (192?-67, consolidated into Zane Trace)
- Frankfort **Adena** Warriors^{3} (Frankfort before 1965) (192?-31, to SEOAL, 1937-75, to Scioto Valley League)
- South Salem **Buckskin** Bucks (192?-65, consolidated into McClain)
- **Centralia** Bulldogs (192?-67, consolidated into Zane Trace)
- **Clarksburg** Wildcats (192?-65, consolidated into Adena)
- Huntington Township **Huntington** Huntsmen^{5} (192?-75, to Scioto Valley League)
- **Kingston** Redskins (192?-67, consolidated into Zane Trace)
- Londonderry **Liberty Township** Lions (192?-55, consolidated into Southeastern)
- Bainbridge **Paint Valley** Bearcats^{2} (Bainbridge before 1958) (192?-75, to Scioto Valley League)
- Richmond Dale **Southeastern** Panthers (Richmond Dale before 1955) (192?-75, to Scioto Valley League)
- Bourneville **Twin** Tigers (192?-58, consolidated into Paint Valley)
- Pleasant Valley **Unioto** Sherman Tanks^{1} (192?-74, to South Central Ohio League)
- Chillicothe **Bishop Flaget**Panthers (1958–75, to Scioto Valley League)
- Kingston **Zane Trace** Pioneers^{4} (1967–75, to Scioto Valley League)
1. Concurrent with RCL and SVL 1962-74.
2. Concurrent with RCL and SVL 1962-75.
3. Concurrent with RCL and SVL 1968-75.
4. Concurrent with RCL and SVL 1971-75.
5. Concurrent with RCL and SVL 1972-75.

== Scenic Hills Conference ==
A short-lived "bridge" conference for newly consolidated and larger schools until the Inter-Valley Conference was formed.

- **Newcomerstown** Trojans^{1} (1964–68, to Inter-Valley Conference)
- West Lafayette **Ridgewood** Generals^{1} (1964–68, to Inter-Valley Conference)
- Roscoe **Three Rivers** Patriots^{2} (1964–65, consolidated into River View)
- Millersburg **West Holmes** Knights (1964–68, to Chippewa Conference)
- Warsaw **River View** Black Bears (1965–68)
1. Concurrent with Tuscarawas County League 1964-65, Tuscarawas Valley Athletic Conference 1965-68.
2. Concurrent with Coshocton County League 1964-65.

== Scioto County League ==
The conference ended in 1979 as the non-Southern Ohio Conference affiliated members, who maintained affiliation with the Tri-County League, moved to the SOC while keeping TCL ties intact.

- Franklin Furnace **Green** Bobcats^{5} (192?-79, to Southern Ohio)
- **Minford** Falcons^{2} (192?-79, to Southern Ohio)
- McDermott **Northwest** Mohawks^{4} (McDermott before 1958) (192?-79, to Southern Ohio)
- **Otway** Redbirds (192?-58, consolidated into Northwest)
- **Rarden** Bulldogs (192?-58, consolidated into Northwest)
- **South Webster** Jeeps^{5} (192?-79, to Southern Ohio)
- Lucasville **Valley** Indians^{3} (192?-79, to Southern Ohio)
- **Wheelersburg** Pirates^{1} (192?-79, to Southern Ohio)
- Portsmouth **Central Catholic** Titans (1938–46, to Southern Ohio Conference)
- Rosemount **Clay** Panthers^{5} (1938–79, to Southern Ohio)
- New Boston **Glenwood** Tigers (1938–46, to Southern Ohio Conference)
- Sciotoville **Portsmouth East** Tartans (1938–46, to Southern Ohio Conference)
- West Portsmouth **Washington Township** Senators (1938–46, to Southern Ohio Conference)
1. Concurrent with SCL and SOC 1946-79.
2. Concurrent with SCL and SOC 1947-58, 1959-79.
3. Concurrent with SCL and SOC 1958-79.
4. Concurrent with SCL and SOC 1960-79.
5. Concurrent with SCL and TCL 1964-79.

== South Central Ohio League ==
- **Chillicothe** Cavaliers (1923–31, 1937–41, 1944–48, 2013–2017)
- Clarksville **Clinton-Massie** Falcons (2005–2017)
- Lees Creek **East Clinton** Astros (2012–2017)
- **Hillsboro** Indians (1923–31, 1937–92, 2003-2017)
- Greenfield **McClain** Tigers (1923–31, 1937–92, 2003–2017)
- Washington Court House **Miami Trace** Panthers (1960–92, 2003–2017)
- Washington Court House **Washington** Blue Lions (1923–31, 1937–92, 2003–2017)
- **Wilmington** Hurricane (1923–31, 1944–92, 2014–2017)
- **Circleville** Tigers (1923–31, 1939–92)
- Frankfort **Adena** Warriors (1924–31)
- **Franklin Heights** Falcons (1958–64)
- Pleasant View (now **Westland**) Panthers (1958–64)
- London **Madison-Plains** Golden Eagles (1973–75, 1977–85, 2003–13)
- Chillicothe **Unioto** Sherman Tanks (1974–76)
- Ashville **Teays Valley** Vikings (1977–83)
- **London** Red Raiders (2003–13)

== Southeastern Ohio Athletic League ==
The SEOAL was Ohio's oldest non-city athletic league, founded in 1925. The 2016-2017 school year was the final year the SEOAL existed as a conference ending a long tenure of historic rivalries. Controversy surrounded Athens and Marietta's exits as no real reason was given but wide speculation was that it was due to them being unable to compete with the other schools on a regular basis. No all-sports trophy was awarded due to only having three members in the final year.

- **Jackson** Ironmen (1925-2017)
- **Logan** Chieftains (1925-2017)
- Vincent **Warren** Warriors (1986-2017)
- The Plains **Athens** Bulldogs (1925–28, 1931-2008)
- Gallipolis **Gallia Academy** Blue Devils (1925-2016)
- **Ironton** Fighting Tigers (1925–31, 1968–85, 2006–10)
- **Nelsonville** Greyhounds (1925–67, consolidated into Nelsonville-York)
- **Pomeroy** Purple Panthers (1925–67, consolidated into Meigs)
- **Portsmouth** Trojans (1925–28, 2006-2014)
- **Wellston** Golden Rockets (1925–82)
- New Boston **Glenwood** Tigers (1927–37)
- **Middleport** Yellow Jackets (1929–67, consolidated into Meigs)
- Pomeroy **Meigs** Marauders (1967–83)
- **Nelsonville-York** Buckeyes (1967–70)
- **Waverly** Tigers (1970–83)
- **Marietta** Tigers (1985-2010)
- Bidwell **River Valley** Raiders (1994-2001)
- **Point Pleasant** (WV) Big Blacks (1996-2005)
- **Chillicothe** Cavaliers (2006–13)
- **Zanesville** Blue Devils (2006–10)

From 2006-10, the SEOAL played in North and South divisions:

- North: Athens (2006–08), Logan, Marietta, Warren, Zanesville
- South: Chillicothe, Gallia, Ironton, Jackson, Portsmouth

== Southeastern Ohio Buckeye League ==
- **Belpre** Golden Eagles (1946–65, to Tri-Valley Conference 1969)
- **Chauncey-Dover** Blue Devil's (1946–65, to Athens County League)
- **Jacksonville-Trimble** Cardinals (1946–64, consolidated into Glouster)
- **McArthur** Generals (1946–65, to Mid-Ohio Valley League (Southern)^{1}
- **Oak Hill** Oaks (1946–49, to Jackson County League)^{2}
- **Rutland** Red Devils (1946–65, to MOVL)^{3}
- **The Plains** Indians (1946–65, to ACL)
- Vincent **Warren** Warriors (1961–65, to TVC 1969)
1. Concurrent with Vinton County 1946-65.
2. Concurrent with JCL 1946-49.
3. Concurrent with Meigs County League 1946-65.

== Southern Valley Athletic Conference ==
Originally the Gallia County League, the conference changed its name to the SVAC in 1958 with an eye on expanding the league to protect against future consolidations. The conference fell apart in 1992 when it was reduced to three schools after four members (Hannan Trace, Kyger Creek, North Gallia, and Southwestern) consolidated into one (River Valley) and Oak Hill left for another league. Eastern, Southern, and River Valley limped along until those three found conference homes the following year.

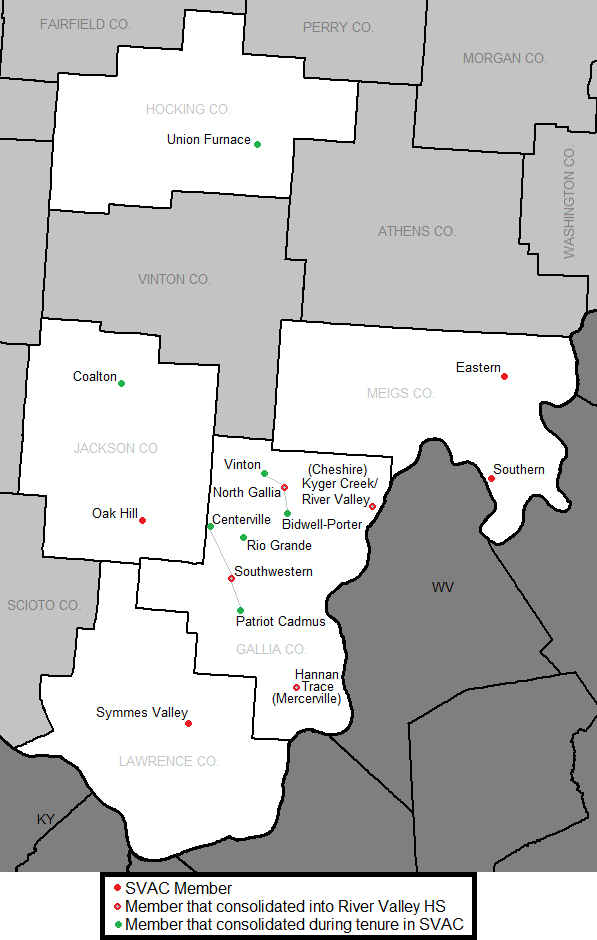
All time members of the Southern Valley Athletic Conference (SVAC)

- Patriot **Cadmus** Redskins (192?-65, consolidated into Southwestern)
- **Centerville** Welshmen (192?-65, consolidated into Southwestern)
- Cheshire **Kyger Creek** Bobcats (192?-92, Cheshire until 1965, consolidated into River Valley)
- Crown City **Hannan Trace** Wildcats (192?-92, was Mercerville until 1965, consolidated into River Valley)
- Vinton **North Gallia** Pirates (192?-92, Bidwell-Porter until 1965, consolidated into River Valley)
- **Rio Grande** Bluemen (192?-61, consolidated into Gallia Academy)
- Huntington **Vinton** Tigers (192?-65, consolidated into North Gallia)
- **Coalton** Vikings (1954–64, consolidated into Wellston)
- Reedsville **Eastern** Eagles^{1} (1961–92, to Tri-Valley Conference)
- Racine **Southern** Tornadoes^{1} (1961–92, to Tri-Valley Conference)
- **Union Furnace** Warriors (1962–73, consolidated into Logan)
- Patriot **Southwestern** Highlanders (1965–92, consolidated into River Valley)
- Willow Wood **Symmes Valley** Vikings (1971–77, to Ohio Valley Conference, 1984–92, to Southern Ohio Conference)
- **Oak Hill** Oaks (1984–92, to Southern Ohio Conference)
1. Concurrent with Meigs County League 1961-67, and Mid-Ohio Valley Conference 1965-69 (for Southern) or 1965-71 (for Eastern).

== Tri-County League (Southeast) ==
This league started in 1964 with the dissolution of the Pike County League. The two schools not already in other conferences joined with schools from neighboring Adams and Scioto counties that wanted a secondary conference to fill their schedules. These schools largely ended up in the Southern Hills Athletic Conference or the Southern Ohio Conference by the time the league wound up in 1985.

- Portsmouth **Clay** Panthers^{1} (1964–85, to Southern Ohio Conference)
- Beaver **Eastern** Eagles^{2} (1964–85, to Southern Ohio Conference)
- Franklin Furnace **Green** Bobcats^{1} (1964–85, to Southern Ohio Conference)
- **Manchester** Greyhounds^{3} (1964–71, to Southern Hills Athletic Conference)
- **Peebles** Indians^{3, 4} 1964-84, to Southern Hills Athletic Conference)
- **South Webster** Jeeps^{1} (1964–85, to Southern Ohio Conference)
- Latham **Western** Indians (1964–85, to Southern Hills Athletic Conference)
1. Played concurrently in TCL and Scioto County League 1964-79, and TCL and SOC 1979-85.
2. Played concurrently in TCL and SOC 1981-85.
3. Played concurrently in TCL and Adams County League 1964-70.
4. Played concurrently in the TCL and SHAC 1971-84.

== Tri-State Athletic Conference ==
- **Barboursville** (WV) Pirates (1975–80; consolidated into Cabell Midland HS in 1994)
- Ashland (KY) **Blazer** Tomcats (1975–80)
- Cannonsburg (KY) **Boyd County** Lions (1975–80)
- Huntington (WV) **East** Highlanders (1975–80; consolidated into the current Huntington HS in 1996)
- Greenup (KY) **Greenup County** Musketeers (1975–80)
- **Huntington** (WV) Pony Express (1975–80; school closed in 1996 and consolidated into the current Huntington High)
- **Ironton** Tigers (1975–80)
- **Portsmouth** Trojans (1975–80)
- **Russell** (KY) Red Devils (1975–80)

== Tuscarawas County League ==
- **Baltic** Eagles (192?-65, consolidated into Garaway)
- **Bolivar** Cardinals (192?-56, consolidated into Tuscarawas Valley)
- **Dennison** Railroaders (192?-65, TCL to Tuscarawas Valley Athletic Conference)
- **Dundee** Bulldogs (192?-57, consolidated into Garaway)
- **Gnadenhutten** Indians (192?-67, consolidated into Indian Valley South)
- **Midvale** Blue Devils (192?-67, consolidated into Indian Valley North)
- **Mineral City** Tigers (192?-56, consolidated into Tuscarawas Valley)
- **Newcomerstown** Trojans^{2} (192?-65, never a member of TCL to Scenic Hills Conference and TVAC)
- **New Cumberland** Eagles (192?-36, never a member of TCL consolidated into Mineral City)
- **Port Washington** Purple Riders (192?-67, consolidated into Indian Valley South)
- **Ragersville** Pirates (192?-36, consolidated into Baltic)
- **Stone Creek** Golden Panthers (192?-65, consolidated into New Philadelphia)
- **Strasburg-Franklin** Tigers (192?-68, to Senate)
- **Shanesville-Sugarcreek** Pirates (192?-57, consolidated into Garaway)
- **Tuscarawas** Bronchos (192?-68, consolidated into Indian Valley North)
- **Uhrichsville** Tigers (192?-65, never a member of TCL to TVAC)
- **Winfield** Wildcats (192?-34, consolidated into Dover)
- Zoarville **Tuscarawas Valley** Trojans^{1} (1956–67, to Senate League)
- Sugarcreek **Garaway** Pirates^{1} (1957–67, to Inter-Valley Conference)
1. Concurrent with TVAC 1960-68.
2. Concurrent with SHC 1964-65.

== Tuscarawas Valley Athletic Conference ==
Formed in 1953 as some of the Tuscarawas County schools proved to be too large to face sufficient competition in the county league, these schools banded together with other larger schools in the area an inter-county league. The league ended in 1967, as the largest schools joined the dwindling Stark County AA League schools to form the Senate League, and most of the other schools helped found the Inter-Valley Conference.

- Bowerston **Conotton Valley** Rockets^{1,2} (1960–68, to Harrison County League)
- **Dennison** Railroaders (1960–65, consolidated into Claymont)
- Sugarcreek **Garaway** Pirates^{3} (1960–68, to Inter-Valley Conference)
- **Malvern** Hornets^{1} (1960–68, to Inter-Valley Conference)
- Zoarville **Tuscarawas Valley** Trojans^{3} (1960–68, to Senate League)
- **Uhrichsville** Tigers (1960–65, consolidated into Claymont)
- **West Lafayette** Generals^{4} (1960–64, consolidated into Ridgewood)
- West Lafayette **Ridgewood** Generals^{5} (1964–68, to Inter-Valley Conference)
- Uhrichsville **Claymont** Mustangs (1965–68, to Senate League)
- **Newcomerstown** Trojans^{5} (1965–68, to Inter-Valley Conference)
1. Concurrent with Carroll County League 1960-62.
2. Concurrent with HCL 1960-68.
3. Concurrent with Tuscarawas County League 1960-68.
4. Concurrent with Coshocton County League 1960-64.
5. Concurrent with Scenic Hills Conference throughout TVAC membership.

== Twin State League ==
- Beverly **Fort Frye** Cadets (2022–2025)
- **Marietta** Tigers (2022–2025)
- **Point Pleasant** (WV) Big Blacks (2022–2025)
- Vincent **Warren** Warriors (2022–2025)

== Vinton County League ==
- **Allensville** Bombers (192?-66, consolidated into Vinton County)
- Zaleski **Brown-Zaleski** Panthers (192?-66, consolidated into Vinton County)
- **Hamden** Engineers (192?-66, consolidated into Vinton County)
- **McArthur** Generals (192?-66, consolidated into Vinton County)^{1}
- Wilkesville **Wilton** Jets (192?-66, consolidated into Vinton County)
- **Vinton Rural** Tigers (192?-66, consolidated into Vinton County)
1. Concurrent with Southeastern Ohio Buckeye League 1946-65, and Mid-Ohio Valley Conference 1965-66.

== Washington County League ==
- Vincent **Barlow** Bobcats (192?-61, consolidated into Warren)
- **Bartlett** Indians (192?-61, consolidated into Warren)
- **Belpre** Golden Eagles (192?-46, to Southeastern Ohio Buckeye League)
- **Beverly** Bruins (192?-56, consolidated into Fort Frye)
- **Lawrence** Golden Eagles (192?-64, to Frontier Valley League)
- **Lowell** Panthers (192?-56, consolidated into Fort Frye)
- **New Matamoras** Bulldogs (192?-64, to FVL)
- **Newport** Trojans (192?-64, to FVL)
- Marietta **St. Mary's Central** Irish (192?-64, to FVL)
- Lower Salem **Salem-Liberty** Cardinals (192?-64, to FVL)
- **Waterford** Wildcats (192?-64, to FVL)
- Beverly **Fort Frye** Cadets (1956–64, to FVL)

== See also ==
- Ohio High School Athletic Association
- Ohio High School Athletic Conferences
- OHSAA East/Southeast Regions athletic conferences
