= Kyger (disambiguation) =

Kyger may refer to:

- Kyger, Ohio, unincorporated community in Ohio (USA)
- Kyger Creek, a stream of water nearby Kyger, Ohio
- Joanne Kyger, American poet
- Kyger Creek Power Plant, coal-fired power station located in Ohio (USA)
- Kyger Creek High School, former public high school in Ohio (USA)
