= Beallsville High School =

Coordinates: 39.848°N 81.041°W

Location
- 43822 State Route 556; Beallsville, Ohio 43716; United States

Information
- Type: Public high school
- Established: 1928
- Closed: 2025
- School district: Switzerland of Ohio Local School District
- Superintendent: Phil Ackerman
- Principal: April Parden
- Teaching staff: 12.07 (FTE)
- Student to teacher ratio: 9.36
- Colors: Blue and White
- Athletics conference: Ohio Valley Athletic Conference
- Team name: Blue Devils
- Website: www.switzerlandohschools.com/beallsville-schools/

Beallsville High School was a public high school in Beallsville, Ohio, United States. It was one of three high schools in the Switzerland of Ohio Local School District. Sports teams were called the Blue Devils and they competed in the Ohio High School Athletic Association as a member of the Ohio Valley Athletic Conference.

== History ==
On August 29, 2011, Beallsville High School began its 84th and final year in the old high school building, which opened in September 1928. The current K-12 at the time, had their final day in the old high school building on February 17, 2012. The students were then moved into the new school after Presidents Day weekend on February 21, 2012.

On February 26, 2015, the Switzerland of Ohio School Board voted to close the high school at the end of the school year, but the ruling was struck down in court, thus keeping the school open.

The school board voted again on May 29, 2025, to close Beallsville High School at the end of the school year and to transfer its high school students to either Monroe Central High School in Woodsfield or to River High School in Hannibal. The 7th and 8th graders would be moved to Beallsville Elementary.

== Athletics ==
=== OVAC Conference Championships ===
- Baseball - 1996, 2001
- Boys Basketball - 2003
- Girls Basketball - 1982, 1993, 2002, 2004, 2009, 2010, 2019, 2020
- Football - 1968, 1970, 1977, 1981, 1988, 1992, 1994, 2000, 2006, 2011
- Golf - 1982, 1995
- Softball - 1983, 2000
- Boys Track - 1971, 1979, 2011
- Volleyball - 2002, 2006, 2007, 2008
- Wrestling - 1978, 1982, 1987, 1988, 2008

== Notable alumni ==
- Dustin Nippert - former MLB player for the Arizona Diamondbacks & Texas Rangers
