= Kyger Creek High School =

Public high school near Bidwell, Ohio (USA)

Coordinates: 38°55′43″N 82°08′06″W

Location
- 1428 Little Kyger Rd. Cheshire, (Gallia County), Ohio 45620; United States

Information
- Type: Public, Coeducational high school
- School district: Gallia County Local School District
- Grades: 9-12
- Colors: Scarlet & Gray
- Athletics conference: Southern Valley Athletic Conference (SVAC)
- Team name: Bobcats

Kyger Creek High School was a public high school located outside of the village of Cheshire, at the intersection of Little Kyger and Gravel Hill roads in northern Gallia County, Ohio (USA). It replaced Cheshire High School in 1956 and was in turn replaced by River Valley High School in 1992.

== History ==
The Kyger Creek Local School District was formed by the consolidation of four rural school districts—Cheshire, Kyger, Addison, and Bulaville. Each of these districts had an elementary school, but only Cheshire had a high school. It was located in the village of Cheshire in a building shared with the elementary school. Three new facilities were constructed replacing all previously existing buildings. The new high school, very modern for its time, was located about two miles outside the village of Cheshire, and was given the name Kyger Creek High School. The first official graduating class was the class of 1957. The other facilities were Cheshire-Kyger Elementary School, located about one half mile from Cheshire, and Addaville Elementary School, located about two miles outside the village of Addison, Ohio.

The school district was named for the Kyger Creek Power Plant, a large coal-fired electrical generating plant, which was built in the 1950s at the junction of Kyger Creek and the Ohio River.

Tax money from the new plant provided generous funding for the new school system.

By 1974, declining rural populations, competition for students from the county-wide vocational high school, and the need for a broader sharing of the tax money from the power plant with other schools led to further consolidation, and the Kyger Creek Local School District was incorporated into the newly formed Gallia County Local School District along with Hannan Trace High School, North Gallia High School, and Southwestern High School. The new district did not immediately consolidate the high schools, so Kyger Creek High School continued until 1992. At that time, the other high schools were closed, and their students were transported to the Kyger Creek High School facility, now renamed River Valley High School.

The building was left abandoned in 2009 when the new RVHS was moved to Ohio State Route 160 in Bidwell. On July 16, 2019, an arson had occurred at the former high school.

== Notable alumni ==
- Frank Cremeans, represented the state of Ohio in the United States House of Representatives.
