= Woodsfield, Ohio =

- Village
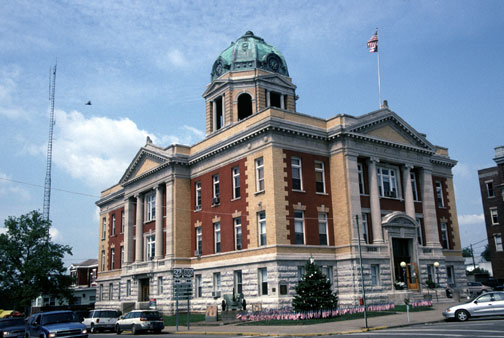
- Monroe County Courthouse
- Interactive map of Woodsfield, Ohio
- Location within Ohio Location within the United States
- Coordinates: 39°45′50″N 81°07′26″W
- Country: United States
- State: Ohio
- County: Monroe
- Township: Center

Area
  - Total: 2.02 sq mi (5.22 km^{2})
  - Land: 2.02 sq mi (5.22 km^{2})
  - Water: 0 sq mi (0.00 km^{2})
- Elevation: 1,201 ft (366 m)

Population (2020)
  - Total: 2,210
  - Density: 1,096.8/sq mi (423.48/km^{2})
- Time zone: UTC-5 (Eastern (EST))
  - Summer (DST): UTC-4 (EDT)
- ZIP code: 43793
- Area code: 740
- FIPS code: 39-86436
- GNIS feature ID: 2399736
- Website: https://villageofwoodsfield.org/

Woodsfield is a village and the county seat of Monroe County, Ohio, United States, located about 30 miles (48 km) northeast of Marietta. The population was 2,210 at the 2020 census.

== History ==
Woodsfield was founded in 1813 as seat of the newly formed Monroe County. It was named for Archibald Woods. The village was incorporated in 1835.

== Geography ==
According to the United States Census Bureau, the village has a total area of 2.02 square miles (5.23 km^{2}), all land.

== Demographics ==
Historical population
Census	Pop.	Note	%±
1820	81		—
1830	157		93.8%
1840	262		66.9%
1850	393		50.0%
1860	799		103.3%
1870	753		−5.8%
1880	861		14.3%
1890	1,031		19.7%
1900	1,801		74.7%
1910	2,562		42.3%
1920	2,394		−6.6%
1930	2,317		−3.2%
1940	2,442		5.4%
1950	2,410		−1.3%
1960	1,956		−18.8%
1970	3,239		65.6%
1980	3,145		−2.9%
1990	2,832		−10.0%
2000	2,598		−8.3%
2010	2,384		−8.2%
2020	2,210		−7.3%
U.S. Decennial Census

=== 2010 census ===
As of the census of 2010, there were 2,384 people, 1,054 households, and 617 families living in the village. The population density was 1,180.2 inhabitants per square mile (455.7/km^{2}). There were 1,248 housing units at an average density of 617.8 per square mile (238.5/km^{2}). The racial makeup of the village was 97.3% White, 0.7% African American, 0.2% Asian, 0.4% from other races, and 1.4% from two or more races. Hispanic or Latino of any race were 1.0% of the population.

There were 1,054 households, of which 25.3% had children under the age of 18 living with them, 41.2% were married couples living together, 13.7% had a female householder with no husband present, 3.7% had a male householder with no wife present, and 41.5% were non-families. 37.8% of all households were made up of individuals, and 21.2% had someone living alone who was 65 years of age or older. The average household size was 2.17 and the average family size was 2.81.

The median age in the village was 45.9 years. 21.4% of residents were under the age of 18; 7% were between the ages of 18 and 24; 20.2% were from 25 to 44; 24.9% were from 45 to 64; and 26.6% were 65 years of age or older. The gender makeup of the village was 45.5% male and 54.5% female.

=== 2000 census ===
As of the census of 2000, there were 2,598 people, 1,127 households, and 726 families living in the village. The population density was 1,271.4 inhabitants per square mile (490.9/km^{2}). There were 1,268 housing units at an average density of 620.5 per square mile (239.6/km^{2}). The racial makeup of the village was 98.81% White, 0.04% African American, 0.19% Native American, 0.12% Asian, 0.04% Pacific Islander, 0.27% from other races, and 0.54% from two or more races. Hispanic or Latino of any race were 0.58% of the population.

There were 1,127 households, out of which 25.7% had children under the age of 18 living with them, 50.5% were married couples living together, 11.8% had a female householder with no husband present, and 35.5% were non-families. 32.4% of all households were made up of individuals, and 17.2% had someone living alone who was 65 years of age or older. The average household size was 2.23 and the average family size was 2.81.

In the village, the population was spread out, with 20.7% under the age of 18, 7.1% from 18 to 24, 23.9% from 25 to 44, 25.3% from 45 to 64, and 22.9% who were 65 years of age or older. The median age was 44 years. For every 100 females there were 81.7 males. For every 100 females age 18 and over, there were 78.0 males.

The median income for a household in the village was $24,682, and the median income for a family was $33,500. Males had a median income of $35,964 versus $18,036 for females. The per capita income for the village was $13,816. About 12.4% of families and 17.3% of the population were below the poverty line, including 27.5% of those under age 18 and 14.9% of those age 65 or over.

== Recent economic trouble ==
An Ormet Corporation employee strike affected Woodsfield's economic base in 2004, but once the strike ended, things began to improve. When the plant in nearby Hannibal was closed in 2006, another blow was dealt to local employees and the economy. That facility reopened by the end of 2006, although it no longer employs as large a staff as when it closed.

== Education ==
The schools in Woodsfield are part of the Switzerland of Ohio Local School District. It is the largest school district by land area in the state of Ohio. The schools are:

- Woodsfield Elementary School - kindergarten through 8th grade
- Monroe Central High School - 9th through 12th (created by the merger of Skyvue High School and Woodsfield High School)
- Beallsville Elementary and Beallsville High School
- Powhatan Elementary and Powhatan High School
- River Elementary and River High School
- Swiss Hills Career Center - vocational school, 11th and 12th graders

There is also a private Catholic grade school in Woodsfield.

- St. Sylvester's Central Elementary School - Preschool - 8th grade

Woodsfield has a public lending library, the Monroe County District Library.

Belmont College's Monroe County Center is located in Woodsfield.

== Notable people ==
- Sophronia Farrington Naylor Grubb
- Rebecca Naylor Hazard
- Sad Sam Jones, former professional baseball player and member of the New York Yankees
- William Sinclair, U.S. Army brigadier general
- Samuel Steward, author
- Mary Weddle, All-American Girls Professional Baseball League player
