= Southwestern High School (Patriot, Ohio) =

Public high school near Patriot, Ohio, United States

Location
- 4848 OH-325; Patriot, Gallia County, Ohio 45658; United States; 38°49′20″N 82°24′09″W

Information
- Type: Public, Coeducational high school
- Established: 1965
- Closed: 1992
- School district: Gallia County Local School District
- Grades: 9-12
- Colors: Red, white, & blue
- Athletics conference: Southern Valley Athletic Conference (SVAC)
- Team name: Highlanders

Southwestern High School was a public high school located near the village of Patriot, Ohio. It opened in 1965 and closed in 1992 when it was consolidated into River Valley High School in Bidwell, Ohio.

== History ==
The Southwestern Local School District was formed in 1965 when the school districts from Centerville and Patriot Cadmus consolidated.

By 1974, declining rural populations, competition for students from the county-wide vocational high school, and the need for a broader sharing of the tax money from the power plant with other schools led to further consolidation, and the Southwestern Local School District was incorporated into the newly formed Gallia County Local School District along with Hannan Trace High School, Kyger Creek High School, and North Gallia High School. The new district did not immediately consolidate the high schools, so Southwestern High School continued until 1992 with the three others. At that time, the other high schools were closed and their students were transported to the Kyger Creek High School building, which was renamed River Valley High School.

In 1993, Buckeye Rural Electric Cooperative purchased the former Southwestern High School and remodeled the building for occupation by November 1994. Southwestern Elementary is located next to the building.
