= South Gallia High School (Crown City, Ohio) =

Location
- 55 Rebel Drive; Mercerville, (Gallia County), Ohio 45623; United States; 38°39′42″N 82°16′36″W

Information
- Type: Public, Coeducational high school
- School district: Gallia County Local School District
- Superintendent: Phillip Kuhn
- Principal: Bray M. Shamblin
- Grades: 9-12
- Enrollment: 137 (2024-2025)
- Colors: Red and Gold
- Athletics conference: Southern Ohio Conference
- Team name: Rebels
- Accreditation: North Central Association of Colleges and Schools
- Newspaper: The Rebel Voice
- Website: School website

South Gallia High School is a public high school in Mercerville, Ohio United States. Because Mercerville does not have its own US Post Office, its mailing address is considered Crown City, despite being 7 miles north of Crown City. It is one of two high schools in the Gallia County Local School District, the other school being River Valley High School. The South Gallia nickname is the Rebels. South Gallia School colors are Red, Gold, and White. The school opened in 1996 after a de-consolidation. The building is located next to the site of the old Hannan Trace High School (home of the Wildcats). South Gallia is a combination of two elementary schools known as Hannan Trace and Southwestern, although Southwestern is a split school between South Gallia and River Valley. South Gallia has around 200 students enrolled. South Gallia has also achieved some of the highest OGT (Ohio Graduation Test) scores in Ohio. South Gallia High School's current principal is Bray M. Shamblin. Previous principals include Tim Scarberry and Scot West.

The South Gallia High School newspaper is The Rebel Voice. It is published twice a month. South Gallia also has many clubs and sports to offer their students.

South Gallia High School has passed a bond levy and built a new high school at the site. The new building was finished in 2009.

== Athletics ==
The Rebels belong to the Ohio High School Athletic Association (OHSAA) and the Southern Ohio Conference, having joined in 2023 after leaving the Tri-Valley Conference.

== See also ==
- Ohio High School Athletic Conferences
