= Monroe County District Library =

Rural public library in Ohio

- 39°45′36″N 081°06′32″W
- Location: 96 Home Ave, Woodsfield, Ohio, 43793, United States
- Type: Public library

Collection
- Items collected: Books, CD's, Videos, Audiobooks, Magazines & Newspapers
- Size: 53,000+

Access and use
- Population served: 15,180
- Members: 8,000

Other information
- Director: Kathy South
- Employees: 9
- Website: monroecounty.lib.oh.us

The Monroe County District Library is a small rural public library in Woodsfield, Ohio, serving a population of 15,180.

The library’s mission statement is as follows: It is the purpose of the Monroe County District Library to create a physical and psychological environment, which is inviting to patrons of all age groups and station and to provide those patrons with the most comprehensive library service possible within the limitations of funds available for service. The Library strives to meet the informational, cultural, educational, recreational, and general needs of the community it serves, and to provide materials that will enable patrons to make intelligent judgments in daily life. To achieve these objectives through the communication of ideas, the library assembles, preserves, and disseminates books, other information media, and related educational and recreational materials such as films.

The library board consists of 7 members who have their regular meeting on the second Tuesday of every month. 9 employees work at the library.

Monroe County Library is a member of SEO, one of the largest Dynix cooperatives in the United States.

== Library services ==
The library’s collection consists of the following:

- 53,000+ books (fiction, nonfiction, adult, children's, young adult)
- CD-ROMs
- Videos (adult and juvenile)--in both VHS and DVD,
- Books on Cassette (adult and juvenile), Magazines (140+ titles)
- Newspapers.
- Books on CD (adult)
- Large print

If any item is not available, users can also request material from other libraries via Interlibrary loan (ILL). All residents of Ohio are eligible to get a library card. Monroe County Library has approximately 8,000 card holders. The library has many other services, most of them free: Laminator, FAX Service, Copier, Projectors (including LCD, Slide, 16 mm, Overhead), Meeting Room for Rent, Gazebo for Rent, Story Time Programs, Other Various Programs, Tax Forms, Ebooks, Reference, Internet capable computers, WiFi, Genealogy and local history information, Online public access catalog, & Online Databases.

== Ohio public library funding ==
The first financial support of public libraries in Ohio began in 1933 when libraries received revenue from the intangible personal property tax. The intangibles tax was levied on individuals’ holdings of stock and bonds. The revenue was collected in the county of origin and was distributed to libraries based on need. In 1983, the Ohio General Assembly repealed the intangibles tax and replaced it with the Library and Local Government Support Fund or LLGSF. An amount of the personal income tax equaling 6.3% of Ohio’s personal income tax receipts were earmarked for the LLGSF. This funding was divided using an equalization formula so that underserved areas would receive a guaranteed share. In 1993, the General Assembly passed legislation reducing the LLGSF from 6.3% to 5.7% of personal income tax. It remained at that level until the 2002-2003 biennium budget called for the funding to be frozen at the same level as July 2000 through June 2001. This was the beginning of a funding freeze which lasted through December 2007. Beginning with January 2008 distributions, a new funding source was developed. This fund named the Public Library Fund or PLF is 2.22% of the state’s total general tax revenue.
