= Hannan Trace High School =

Public high school near Bidwell, Ohio (USA)

Hannan Creek High School

Location
- 266 Mercerville Rd. Crown City, Ohio, (Gallia County) 45623; United States
- Coordinates: 38°39′41″N 82°16′42″W

Information
- Type: Public, coeducational high school
- School district: Gallia County Local School District
- Grades: 9-12
- Colors: Red & black
- Athletics conference: Southern Valley Athletic Conference (SVAC)
- Team name: Wildcats

Hannan Trace High School was a public high school located on the edge of Mercerville, at the intersection of Hannan Trace and Mercerville roads in Gallia County, Ohio (US). It replaced Mercerville High School in 1956 and was in turn replaced by River Valley High School in 1992. HTHS had a Crown City zip code since Mercerville lacks a post office.

== History ==
The Hannan Trace Local School District was formed in 1965 as a replacement for Mercerville High School.

By 1974, declining rural populations, competition for students from the county-wide vocational high school, and the need for a broader sharing of the tax money from the power plant with other schools led to further consolidation, and the Hannan Trace Local School District was incorporated into the newly formed Gallia County Local School District along with Kyger Creek High School, North Gallia High School, and Southwestern High School. The new district did not immediately consolidate the high schools, so Hannan Trace High School continued until 1992 with the three others. At that time, the other high schools were closed and their students were transported to the Kyger Creek High School building, which was renamed River Valley High School.

In 1996, the Gallia County School District decided to renovate the old Hannan Trace building and turn it into South Gallia High School. The building served as the home of the Wildcats, and later, the Rebels, until 2009 when a newer building was set up on the western side of Old Hannan Trace Road and the former school was demolished.
