= Switzerland of Ohio Local School District =

School district in Ohio, United States

Address
- 304 Mill Street Woodsfield, Ohio, 43793; United States

District information
- Type: Public
- Grades: PK–12
- Schools: 8
- NCES District ID: 3904865

Students and staff
- Students: 1,883 (2024–2025)
- Teachers: 197.33 (on an FTE basis) (2024–2025)
- Staff: 380.42 (on an FTE basis) (2024–2025)
- Student–teacher ratio: 9.54 (2024–2024)

Other information
- Website: www.solsd.org

The Switzerland of Ohio Local School District is a rural school district located in southeastern Ohio in the United States. The largest geographic school district in the state, it covers almost all of Monroe County, and parts of Belmont and Noble counties, a total of 546 square miles. As of the 2024–2025 school year, it educates 1,883 students annually; they attend five elementary schools, three high schools, and one career center. In July 2021, Phil Ackerman took over as superintendent.

== Schools ==
=== Elementary schools ===
- Beallsville Elementary School in Beallsville, Ohio in Monroe County
- Skyvue Elementary School in Graysville, Ohio in Monroe County
- Woodsfield Elementary School in Woodsfield, Ohio in Monroe County
- River Elementary School in Hannibal, Ohio in Monroe County
- Powhatan Elementary School in Powhatan Point, Ohio in Belmont County, Ohio

=== High schools ===
- River High School in Hannibal, Ohio in Monroe County
- Monroe Central High School in Woodsfield, Monroe County

=== Career center ===
- Swiss Hills Career Center in Woodsfield, Ohio in Monroe County, Ohio

=== Former schools ===
- Beallsville High School in Beallsville, Monroe County (closed in 2025)
