= Bidwell, Ohio =

Unincorporated community in Ohio, U.S.

Coordinates: 38°55′07″N 82°17′57″W

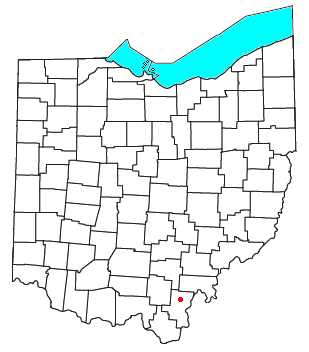
Location of Bidwell, Ohio

Bidwell is a small unincorporated community in northwestern Springfield Township, Gallia County, Ohio, United States, Although unincorporated, it has its own ZIP Code of 45614. Bidwell is located eleven miles from the county seat, Gallipolis. It is at an elevation of 735 feet. As of the 2020 census, Bidwell had a population of 863.

Bidwell is part of the Point Pleasant, WV–OH Micropolitan Statistical Area.

== History ==
The community of Bidwell was founded in 1881 under the name Blaccock, after the arrival of the Crispus Attucks, Hocking Valley, and Toledo Railroad. Charles Heatly (1809–1888) owned the property where the new station was located. His home still stands nearby. Porter Station was built in Heatly as a means of transportation of passengers and freight, which led to its later expansion and the source of the name of the neighboring village of Porter. Circa 1900, Heatly changed its name to Bidwell in honor of John Bidwell, the Prohibition Party's presidential candidate in 1892.

The village expanded in the early 20th century, eventually including several mills and stores. The railroad tracks have since been decommissioned and turned into a bicycle path that spans much of Gallia County, but the former site of the station itself is commemorated by an Ohio historical marker.

== Government ==
As Bidwell is unincorporated without official local government or charter, local government in the township is the responsibility of Springfield Township Trustees.

== Local life ==
The Bidwell area contains two shopping centers. One restaurant serves the community. There are no lodging or other accommodations in Bidwell.

Public education in Bidwell is provided by the Gallia County Local School District. Two of the district's schools are located in the community. River Valley Middle School is a sixth to eighth grade school, and has an enrollment of approximately 400 students. There is also a high school in the area, River Valley High School, which is located behind the middle school. The high school serves students from across the northern half of Gallia County, including the communities of Vinton and Cheshire. Elementary students from Bidwell attend Vinton Elementary School.

The Bidwell area does not have a police force of its own, and is instead patrolled by the Gallia County Sheriff's Department. However, local fire protection is provided by the Springfield Township volunteer fire department. Most funding for the station is received from tax levies.
