= Gavin Power Plant =

Coal-fired power plant in Cheshire, Ohio

- Country: United States
- Location: Cheshire, Ohio
- Coordinates: 38°56′09″N 82°07′00″W
- Status: Operational
- Commission date: 1974-1975
- Owner: Lightstone Generation LLC

Thermal power station
- Primary fuel: Coal

Power generation
- Nameplate capacity: 2,600 MW

External links
- Commons: Related media on Commons

General James M. Gavin Power Plant is a 2,600-megawatt supercritical coal-fired power station in the village of Cheshire, Ohio, United States. It is owned by Lightstone Generation LLC, a 50–50 joint venture of The Blackstone Group L.P. and ArcLight Capital Partners. Gavin is the largest coal-fired power facility in Ohio, and one of the largest in the US, capable of powering two million homes. In February 2017, the plant represented slightly more than 11% of the total electric generation capacity in Ohio according to the Energy Information Administration (EIA).

== History ==
The plant was named in honor of James Maurice "Jumpin' Jim" Gavin, the third Commanding General (CG) of the 82nd Airborne Division during World War II.

Gavin's two units, rated at 1,300 MW each, were placed into service in 1974 and 1975. The power plant is connected to the electric transmission grid by 765-kilovolt transmission lines.

From its activation until the early 2000s, the coal supplier was from a mine in Meigs County owned by American Electric Power (AEP) through its subsidiary, Southern Ohio Coal Company.

In 2000, Gavin was cited by the United States Environmental Protection Agency (EPA) for violating the Clean Air Act and contributing to acid rain.

In 2002, to avoid lawsuits relating to air pollution in the village of Cheshire, AEP decided to buy out the village, by paying every homeowner 3.5 times the market value of their home to move. The total deal came to around $20 million.

AEP sold Gavin along with three other plants to Blackstone and ArcLight as a part of a $2.17 billion deal in 2016.

The power plant has been using unlined pits to store its fly ash, which could contaminate groundwater. The facility's owners applied for a permit from the EPA to continue operating and using the unlined pits. In November 2022, the EPA ordered the utility to stop dumping coal ash into unlined storage ponds and speed cleanup of the site. The plant may have to pause or even cease operations in order to comply with the order. The order becomes effective 135 days after publication in the Federal Register. If additional time is needed, the order included a process to address demonstrated grid reliability issues.

== Operations ==
The plant uses approximately 20,000 tons of coal per day, and emits 13 million tons of carbon dioxide per year. A 2023 report by Sierra Club estimated that pollution from Gavin causes 244 premature deaths per year, the most of any coal plant in the United States.

Gavin is equipped with a suite of air quality controls. These include selective catalytic reduction units that reduce nitrogen oxide (NO_{x}) emissions by 82%; flue-gas desulfurization (FGD) units (scrubbers) that remove 94% of sulfur dioxide (SO_{2}) emissions and electrostatic precipitators for particulate control. Together the controls reduce mercury emissions by up to 91% and particulates by 99%.

The plant contributes approximately $6 million a year in property taxes that support the Gallia County school system and government. The plant is Gallia County's largest taxpayer and makes annual contributions of more than $50,000 to local charities and non-profits.

As of 2026, it is estimated that the plant causes 202 deaths per year due to soot and smog pollution.

== See also ==
- List of largest power stations in the United States
- List of power stations in Ohio
