= Frank Cremeans =

American politician

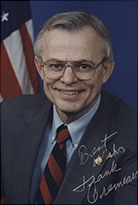

Member of the U.S. House of Representatives from Ohio's 6th district
- In office January 3, 1995 – January 3, 1997
- Preceded by: Ted Strickland
- Succeeded by: Ted Strickland

Personal details
- Born: April 5, 1943 Cheshire, Ohio, U.S.
- Died: January 2, 2003 (aged 59) Gallipolis, Ohio, U.S.
- Party: Republican
- Education: University of Rio Grande; Ohio University

Frank Arnold Cremeans (April 5, 1943 – January 2, 2003) was an American small-businessman who represented Ohio in the United States House of Representatives as a Republican. He served one term in Congress, from 1995 to 1997.

== Biography ==
Cremeans was born in Cheshire, Ohio. After graduating from Kyger Creek High School, Cheshire, Ohio he earned his B.A. at the University of Rio Grande, Rio Grande, Ohio, in 1965 and his M.A. at Ohio University in 1969.

=== Congress ===
Cremeans, the self-made millionaire owner of a concrete company in Gallipolis, was elected in the Republican landslide in 1994, narrowly defeating one-term incumbent Ted Strickland in Ohio's sixth congressional district.

Strickland challenged Cremeans in 1996 to regain the seat. Strickland won by a slim majority thanks to strong Democratic turnout in southeastern Ohio, particularly in Athens County.

=== Later career ===
Cremeans subsequently returned to Gallipolis and his concrete business.

In 1998, Cremeans sought to retake his seat from Strickland, but he was defeated in a three-way Republican primary by Lieutenant Governor Nancy Hollister. In March 2000, he challenged GOP incumbent Senator Mike DeWine in a three way primary, finishing in third place with 8% of the vote. (DeWine drew 80%, and gun show promoter Ronald Dickson drew 12%.)

=== Death ===
He died in Gallipolis in 2003 due to a respiratory disease.

== See also ==
- List of United States representatives from Ohio

U.S. House of Representatives
| Preceded by Ted Strickland | Member of the U.S. House of Representatives from Ohio's 6th congressional district 1995–1997 | Succeeded by Ted Strickland |
