= River Valley High School (Bidwell, Ohio) =

Public high school near Bidwell, Ohio (USA)

Location
- 8785 State Route 160; Bidwell, (Gallia County), Ohio 45614; United States; 38°54′53″N 82°16′53″W

Information
- Type: Public, Coeducational high school
- School district: Gallia County Local School District
- Superintendent: Phillip Kuhn
- Principal: Ty Johnson
- Grades: 9-12
- Enrollment: 402 (2023-2024)
- Colors: Silver and Black
- Athletics conference: Tri-Valley Conference - Ohio Division
- Mascot: Raider
- Team name: Raiders
- Accreditation: North Central Association of Colleges and Schools
- Website: School website

River Valley High School is a public high school near Bidwell, in the U.S. state of Ohio. It is one of two high schools in the Gallia County Local School District, the other school being South Gallia High School. Their nickname is the Raiders. The school has been rated "Excellent" two years in a row on the state report card making it one of the highest ranked schools within several counties. In August 2009 the current RVHS facility was officially opened, taking the place of the previous RVHS located in nearby Cheshire. The new location places River Valley High School just a short distance from its main feeder school, River Valley Middle School (formerly known as Bidwell-Porter Elementary). The 2009–10 school year was the first to take place in the new building, with the Class of 2010 being the first class to graduate, and the Class of 2013 being the first to complete all four years of their secondary education at the new building.

The school opened in the fall of 1992 after the consolidation of the four Gallia County Local School District high schools: Crown City Hannan Trace, Cheshire Kyger Creek, Vinton North Gallia, and Patriot Southwestern. The original high school made use of the former Kyger Creek HS building. River Valley has over 435 students and a staff of 42. The student to teacher ratio is 13 to 1. One language is offered, Spanish. Also, River Valley High School was named Grand Champions at the Ohio State Beta Convention each year from 2006 to 2011.

In 2019, the River Valley High School Alumni Association was created. The Alumni Association will have 3-4 events yearly, including around Homecoming and the end of the School Year. The Association established a River Valley High School Alumni Association Scholarship Fund, and gave out the first two scholarships in 2020. The Alumni Association has since given two scholarships each to the Classes of 2021, 2022, 2023, 2024 and 2025. Another scholarship was given in the Class of 2026, bringing the total scholarships given to 13.

In 2023, the River Valley High School Athletics Hall of Fame was established. The first Hall of Fame Class was inducted in 2023 with 15 inductees. 15 more inductees were added in the Class of 2024, 7 more were inducted in the Class of 2025, and 4 inductees will be inducted from Class of 2026. A total of 41 Hall of Famers for RVHS Athletics will have been inducted by the end of 2026.

== Athletics ==
The Raiders are members of the Ohio High School Athletic Association (OHSAA) and the Tri-Valley Conference, a 16-member athletic conference located in southeastern Ohio. The conference is divided into two divisions based on school size. The Ohio Division features the larger schools. including River Valley, and the Hocking Division features the smaller schools.

=== Sports ===
- Wrestling
- Football
- Soccer
- Girls and Boys Basketball
- Girls Volleyball
- Baseball
- Softball
- Track and Field
- Cross Country
- Cheerleading
- Swimming
- Golf
- Quiz Bowl
- Band
- Color Guard
- Bowling

== See also ==
- Ohio High School Athletic Conferences
