= Gallia County Local School District =

School district in Ohio

Address
- 4836 State Route 325 Patriot, Ohio, 45658; United States

District information
- Type: Public
- Grades: PreK–12
- NCES District ID: 3906568

Students and staff
- Students: 2,150
- Teachers: 240.46 (FTE)
- Staff: 388.27 (FTE)
- Student–teacher ratio: 8.94

Other information
- Website: www.gallialocal.org

The Gallia County Local School District is a public school district headquartered in an unincorporated portion of Springfield Township with a Gallipolis, Ohio (USA) mailing address. It is one of two public school districts in Gallia County.

The school district covers an area of over 420 square miles, including all of Cheshire, Greenfield, Harrison, Morgan, Ohio townships as well as most of Addison, Guyan, Huntington, Perry, Springfield, and Walnut townships, and part of Raccoon Township in Gallia County. The eastern portion of Madison Township in southeastern Jackson County also lies within the district.

Three incorporated villages are served by Gallia County Local Schools: Centerville, Cheshire, and Vinton. Notable unincorporated communities in the district include Bidwell, Kerr, and Patriot.

== Schools ==
There are a total of seven campuses in the Gallia County Local School District - Two high schools, one middle school, and four elementary schools.

- High Schools
  - River Valley High School
  - South Gallia High School
- Middle School
  - River Valley Middle School
- Elementary Schools
  - Addaville Elementary School
  - Hannan Trace Elementary School
  - Southwestern Elementary School
  - Vinton Elementary School
- Former high schools
  - Hannan Trace High School (part of the district from 1974-1992)
  - Kyger Creek High School (part of the district from 1974-1992)
  - North Gallia High School (part of the district from 1974-1992)
  - Southwestern High School (part of the district from 1974-1992)

== History ==
The Gallia County Local School District was formed by the consolidation of four smaller school districts in 1974. They were Kyger Creek, North Gallia, Southwestern, and Hannan Trace Local School Districts. In 1983, the taxpayers of the school district approved a bond issue that paid for the construction of four new elementary schools: Bidwell-Porter, Hannan Trace, Southwestern and Vinton. It also provided for renovations at Addaville and Cheshire-Kyger. In 1991, the school district consolidated the four high schools that had represented the former local districts into one school at the former Kyger Creek High School near Cheshire. The high school was renamed River Valley High School. The old Hannan Trace High School, located north of Crown City, was reopened and renamed South Gallia High School in 1996.

== See also ==
- List of school districts in Ohio
