= Hannibal, Ohio =

- Census-designated place
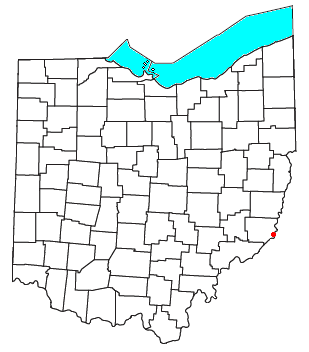
- Location in Ohio
- Coordinates: 39°40′18″N 80°52′35″W
- Country: United States
- State: Ohio
- County: Monroe
- Township: Ohio

Area
  - Total: 1.12 sq mi (2.89 km^{2})
  - Land: 1.12 sq mi (2.89 km^{2})
  - Water: 0 sq mi (0.00 km^{2})
- Elevation: 728 ft (222 m)

Population (2020)
  - Total: 314
  - Density: 281.6/sq mi (108.73/km^{2})
- Time zone: UTC-5 (Eastern (EST))
  - Summer (DST): UTC-4 (EDT)
- ZIP Code: 43931
- Area code: 740
- FIPS code: 39-33222
- GNIS feature ID: 2628898

Hannibal is an unincorporated community and census-designated place (CDP) in eastern Ohio Township, Monroe County, Ohio, United States. It has a post office with the ZIP code 43931. In the 2020 Census, it had a population of 314, down from 411 in 2010.

Hannibal was originally called "Baresville", named for the founder Jacob Bare. A post office called Hannibal was opened and the town's name was soon changed to match.

Hannibal is served by the Switzerland of Ohio Local School District and is home to the K-12 building that houses both River Elementary School and River High School.

== Geography ==
Hannibal lies along Ohio State Route 7, near an intersection with Ohio State Route 536. It is located along the Ohio River, and is home to the Hannibal Locks and Dam. The town lies 8 miles (13 km) below Clarington and 5 miles (8 km) above Sardis. Hannibal is connected to New Martinsville, West Virginia, via the New Martinsville Bridge. Woodsfield, the Monroe county seat, is 19 miles (31 km) to the northwest of Hannibal via state routes 536 and 78.

According to the U.S. Census Bureau, the Hannibal CDP has a total area of 1.1 square miles (2.8 km^{2}), all land.

== Demographics ==
Historical population
Census	Pop.	Note	%±
2010	411		—
2020	314		−23.6%
U.S. Decennial Census
