= Logan Elm High School =

US high school

Coordinates: 39°33′39″N 82°51′04″W

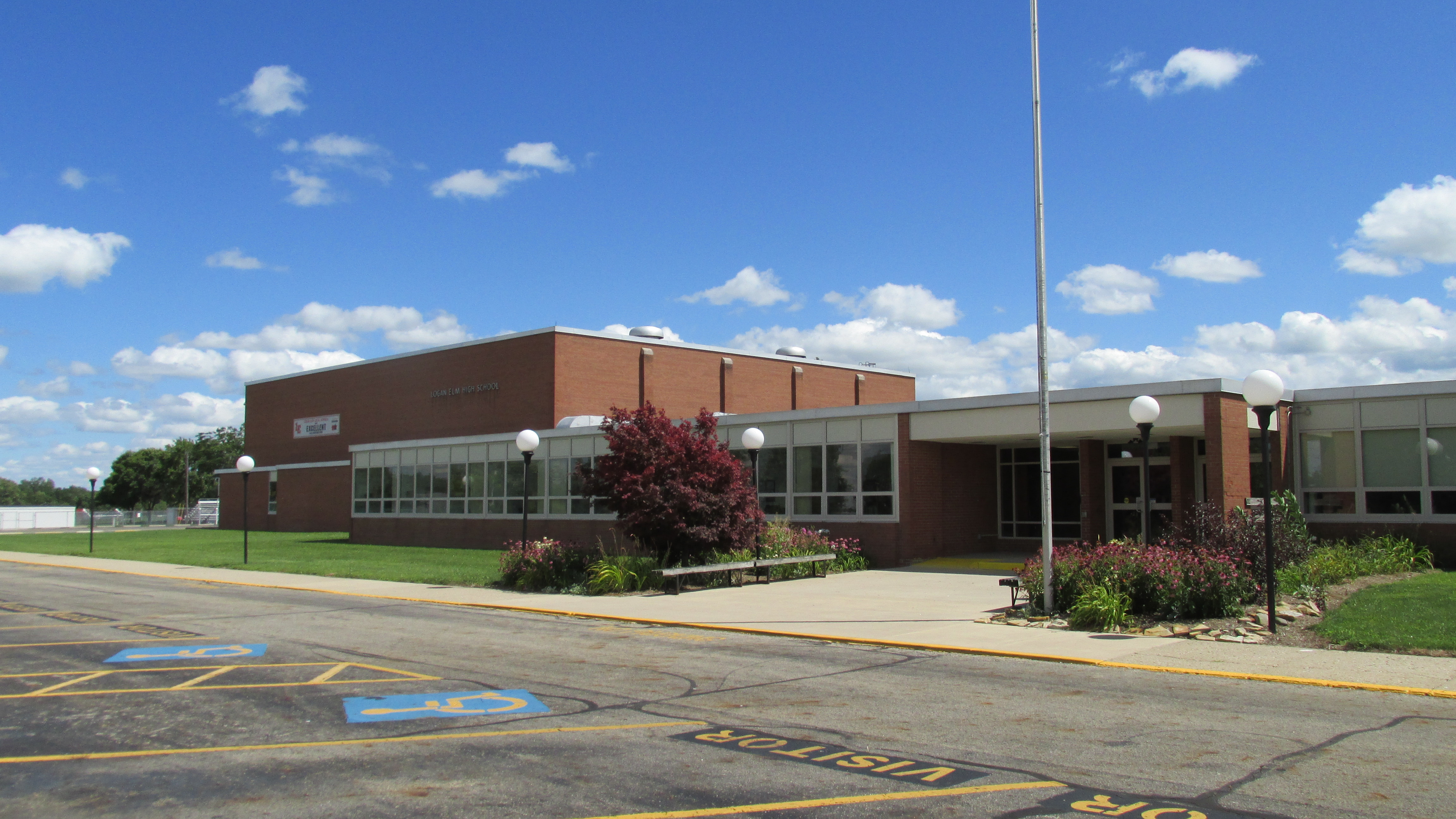
- Old Logan Elm High School Building
- 9575 Tarlton Road; Circleville, Ohio; United States of America

Information
- School type: Public
- Established: 1960
- Principal: Bret King
- Teaching staff: 56.00 (FTE)
- Enrollment: 895 (2023–2024)
- Student to teacher ratio: 15.98
- Colors: Red and white
- Mascot: Braves
- Rival: Circleville High School
- Website: https://www.loganelmschools.com/loganelmhighschool_home.aspx

Logan Elm High School is a public school located near Circleville, Ohio, United States, near the site of the Logan Elm. It serves the Logan Elm School District, which straddles Pickaway and Hocking counties.

== History ==
In 1957, the Pickaway, Washington, and Saltcreek school districts combined to form the Logan Elm School District. Logan Elm High School was built to serve the new district in 1960. It was named after the nearby Elm tree under which Chief Logan delivered a famous speech from in 1774. The first graduation to occur at Logan Elm High School was that of the Class of 1961. In 1972 the Laurelville School District of Hocking County joined the Logan Elm School District, creating the present boundaries of the district. In 2018, voters in the district passed a levy to build a new PK-12 school building, construction began in 2020. After the conclusion of the 2022–23 school year, the original High School building was demolished. The new Logan Elm PK-12 building opened its doors to students in August 2023.

The school's namesake tree was a large elm tree that by 1940 had a height of 104 feet (32 meters), despite sustaining damage as a result of rough weather. The trunk had a diameter of seven feet (2.1 meters), and the branches spread out for more than 150 feet (46 meters). The tree died in 1964, though by this time it had assumed a place as a local legend. Logan Elm High School has in its possession a section of a limb donated by the class of 1965. In 1976 Robert Ely donated to the school a tomahawk which he had made out the wood of the tree. This gift was presented in exchange from a donation of $672 to the Easter Seals.

The Logan Elm Music Department has also experienced success over many decades. The Advanced Choir recently earned a Superior rating at OMEA State Contest in 2025. The Logan Elm choirs make multiple appearances annually to the public to showcase the school’s musical talents. The Logan Elm Marching Band of Pride received Superior ratings at four of the five competitions they attended in 2024, including the 2024 Buckeye Invitational hosted by The Ohio State University. The Band earned a rating of “I”, or “Superior” at the 2024 OMEA State Marching Band Finals. The Concert Band also received a superior rating at OMEA State Contest in the spring of 2025. The Band of Pride makes frequent trips to Bands of America Grand Nationals in Indianapolis, as well as Walt Disney World in Orlando, Florida.

== Standardized testing results ==
Logan Elm High School received a Performance Index Score of 98 for the 2004–2005 school year. 90% of sophomores passed the Reading section of the Ohio Graduation Test (OGT), 83% passed the Writing section, and 82% passed the Math section.

The results of the OGT for the 2006–2007 school year earned Logan Elm High School a designation as "Excellent." Logan Elm met 12 of the 12 indicators, received a Performance Index Score of 98.7 out of 120, and met the Adequate Yearly Progress assigned.

== School profile ==
The school is accredited by the Ohio Department of Education and the North Central Association of Colleges and Schools.

Logan Elm High School is named in honor of an American elm tree that was made famous when the Mingo Indian Chief, Logan, delivered a classic oration under its branches in 1774.

The staff is composed of 41 teachers, two counselors, three secretaries, two monitors, three custodians, one librarian, an athletic director, an assistant principal and a principal. The average number of years teaching experience is 14.1. Fifty-seven percent have a master's degree.

The on-campus teacher-student ratio for 2006–2007 was 21.4 to one; the counselor-student ratio was 360 to one.

There are 15 departments offering 125 different courses over 240 teaching periods. Classes are arranged on a block schedule. The majority of classes meet for a 43-minute traditional session. The remainder employ a 90-minute block per semester. A combined venture with the Pickaway - Ross Career & Technical Center provides one tech prep program. Students attending the JVS may choose from 20 specialty areas.

Students must earn 23 credits to graduate. Subject area requirements include four English, three Social Studies, three Math, three Science, and a half credit of Health/Physical Education.

The library contains 9,650 items, of which 4,069 are nonfiction, 366 are biographical, 2,756 are fiction, 688 are reference and 370 are nonprint media.

Attendance averaged over 269 per day.

Total expenditures for 2006–2007 were $7,335.22.

The current student body consists of 760 students. Of this group 72 attend the Pickaway-Ross Career & Technical Center.

The Class of 2007 had 174 graduates. Their plans after graduation were:

- Associate degree institutions – 39
- Bachelor's degree institutions – 49
- Certificate/license institutions – 8
- Military – 10
- Employment – 24
- Other or unknown – 18

ACT results
90 students tested (state and national averages in parentheses)
English 19.8 (20.7) (20.4)
Mathematics 21.1 (21.2) (20.7)
Composite 21.0 (21.4) (20.9)

Logan Elm built a new school just across from the old school (McDowell) at the beginning of the 2024-2025 school year.
