= Kyger, Ohio =

Unincorporated community in Ohio, U.S.

Coordinates: 38°58′53″N 82°09′18″W

Kyger is an unincorporated community in Gallia County, in the U.S. state of Ohio.

== History ==
Kyger was platted in 1842. The community took its name from nearby Kyger Creek. A post office called Kyger was established in 1837, and remained in operation until 1962.
