= Monroe Central High School (Ohio) =

Coordinates: 39°45′45″N 81°07′49″W

Location
- 469 Lewisville Road; Woodsfield, Ohio 43793; United States

Information
- Type: Public high school
- Established: 1994
- School district: Switzerland of Ohio Local School District
- Superintendent: Phil Ackerman
- Principal: Casey Tolzda
- Teaching staff: 21.80 (on an FTE basis)
- Grades: 9-12
- Enrollment: 241 (2023–2024)
- Student to teacher ratio: 11.06
- Colors: Red, Gold, Black, White
- Athletics conference: Pioneer Valley Conference (primary), Ohio Valley Athletic Conference
- Mascot: Seminole
- Nickname: Noles
- Team name: Seminoles
- Website: www.swissohio.k12.oh.us/monroe-central-high-school/

Monroe Central High School is a public high school in Woodsfield, Ohio, United States. It is one of two high schools in the Switzerland of Ohio Local School District. Sports teams are called the Seminoles, and they compete in the Ohio High School Athletic Association as a member of the Ohio Valley Athletic Conference and Mid-Ohio Valley League.

Monroe Central High School was established in 1994 with the consolidation of Skyvue High School and Woodsfield High School.

== Ohio High School Athletic Association State Championships ==
- Girls Softball – 2004
- Boys Baseball* - 1985

* Title won by Skyvue High School (Graysville, Ohio) prior to 1994 consolidation into Monroe Central

- Boys Basketball - 2025
