= Vinton, Ohio =

- Village
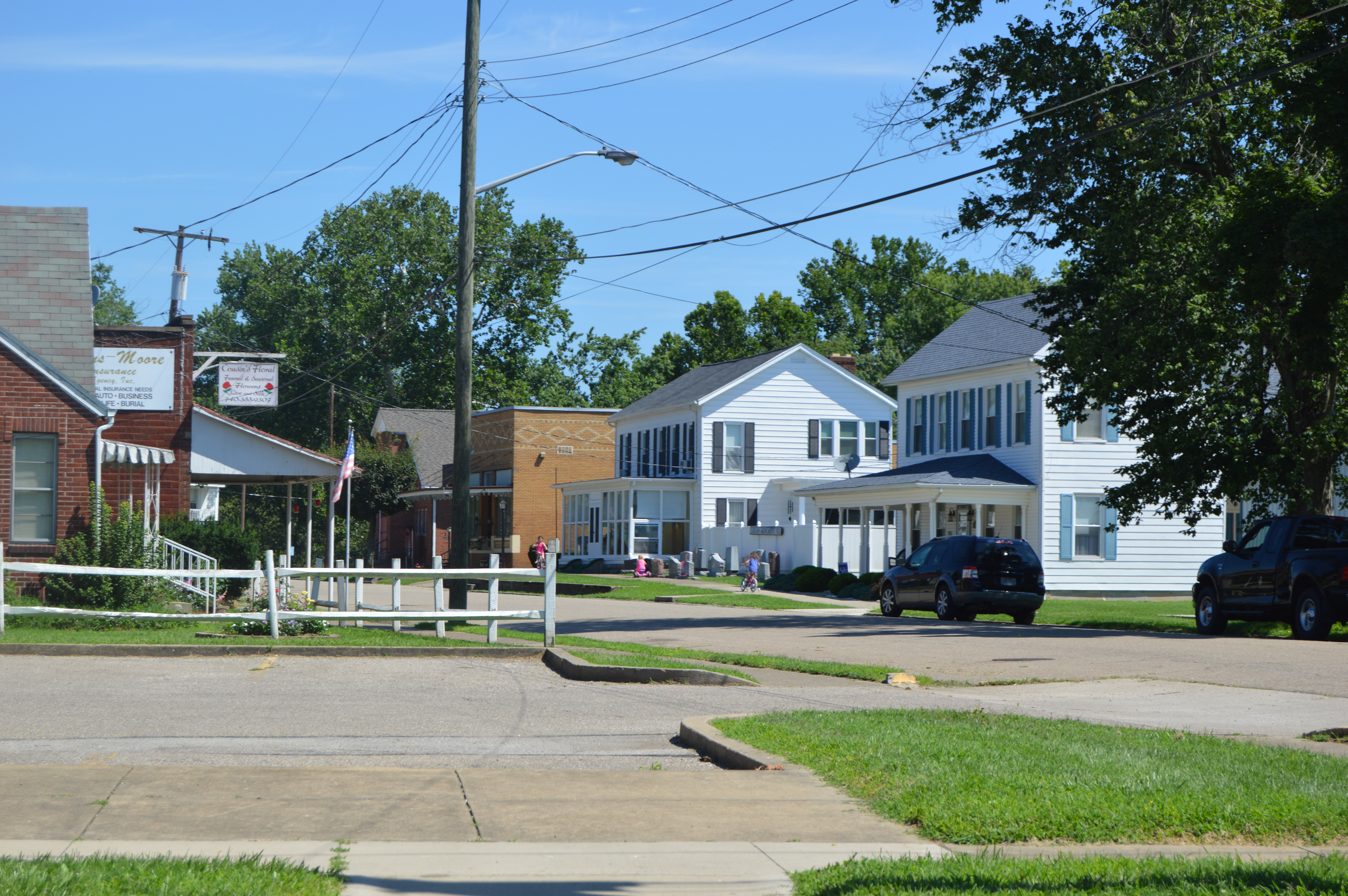
- Main Street

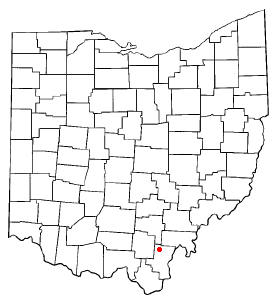
- Location of Vinton, Ohio

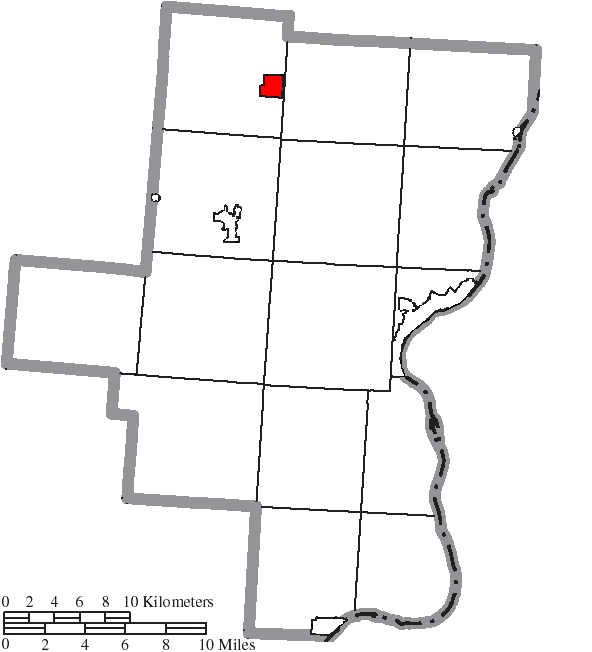
- Location of Vinton in Gallia County
- Coordinates: 38°58′39″N 82°20′15″W
- Country: United States
- State: Ohio
- County: Gallia
- Township: Huntington

Area
  - Total: 1.21 sq mi (3.14 km^{2})
  - Land: 1.18 sq mi (3.05 km^{2})
  - Water: 0.035 sq mi (0.09 km^{2})
- Elevation: 604 ft (184 m)

Population (2020)
  - Total: 224
  - Density: 190.2/sq mi (73.45/km^{2})
- Time zone: UTC-5 (Eastern (EST))
  - Summer (DST): UTC-4 (EDT)
- ZIP code: 45686
- Area code: 740
- FIPS code: 39-80178
- GNIS feature ID: 2400072

Vinton is a village in Gallia County, Ohio, United States. The population was 224 at the 2020 census. It is part of the rural Point Pleasant micropolitan area.

== History ==
Vinton was platted in 1832. A post office called Vinton has been in operation since 1834.

== Geography ==
According to the United States Census Bureau, the village has a total area of 1.21 square miles (3.13 km^{2}), of which 1.18 square miles (3.06 km^{2}) is land and 0.03 square miles (0.08 km^{2}) is water.

Vinton is located on Raccoon Creek, a tributary of the Ohio River.

== Demographics ==
Historical population
Census	Pop.	Note	%±
1870	137		—
1880	196		43.1%
1890	318		62.2%
1900	304		−4.4%
1910	324		6.6%
1920	407		25.6%
1930	344		−15.5%
1940	387		12.5%
1950	378		−2.3%
1960	374		−1.1%
1970	352		−5.9%
1980	375		6.5%
1990	293		−21.9%
2000	324		10.6%
2010	222		−31.5%
2020	224		0.9%
U.S. Decennial Census

=== 2010 census ===
As of the census of 2010, there were 222 people, 95 households, and 65 families living in the village. The population density was 188.1 inhabitants per square mile (72.6/km^{2}). There were 125 housing units at an average density of 105.9 per square mile (40.9/km^{2}). The racial makeup of the village was 99.1% White and 0.9% African American. Hispanic or Latino of any race were 0.5% of the population.

There were 95 households, of which 24.2% had children under the age of 18 living with them, 58.9% were married couples living together, 8.4% had a female householder with no husband present, 1.1% had a male householder with no wife present, and 31.6% were non-families. 30.5% of all households were made up of individuals, and 9.5% had someone living alone who was 65 years of age or older. The average household size was 2.34 and the average family size was 2.89.

The median age in the village was 46.7 years. 20.3% of residents were under the age of 18; 5.9% were between the ages of 18 and 24; 21.8% were from 25 to 44; 35.6% were from 45 to 64; and 16.7% were 65 years of age or older. The gender makeup of the village was 47.3% male and 52.7% female.

=== 2000 census ===
As of the census of 2000, there were 324 people, 123 households, and 91 families living in the village. The population density was 290.5 inhabitants per square mile (112.2/km^{2}). There were 143 housing units at an average density of 128.2 per square mile (49.5/km^{2}). The racial makeup of the village was 97.84% White, 0.62% African American, 0.31% Asian, 1.23% from other races. Hispanic or Latino of any race were 0.31% of the population.

There were 123 households, out of which 35.0% had children under the age of 18 living with them, 61.8% were married couples living together, 10.6% had a female householder with no husband present, and 26.0% were non-families. 22.8% of all households were made up of individuals, and 13.8% had someone living alone who was 65 years of age or older. The average household size was 2.63 and the average family size was 3.11.

In the village, the population was spread out, with 26.9% under the age of 18, 8.6% from 18 to 24, 25.9% from 25 to 44, 25.0% from 45 to 64, and 13.6% who were 65 years of age or older. The median age was 39 years. For every 100 females there were 100.0 males. For every 100 females age 18 and over, there were 97.5 males.

The median income for a household in the village was $25,417, and the median income for a family was $33,250. Males had a median income of $37,250 versus $20,833 for females. The per capita income for the village was $13,836. About 17.9% of families and 16.4% of the population were below the poverty line, including 19.0% of those under age 18 and 20.5% of those age 65 or over.

== Education ==
Public education in the village of Vinton is provided by the Gallia County Local School District.
