= River High School (Hannibal, Ohio) =

Coordinates: 39°40′28″N 80°52′15″W

Location
- 52560 River High School Road; Hannibal, Ohio 43931; United States

Information
- Type: Public high school
- School district: Switzerland of Ohio Local School District
- Superintendent: Phil Ackerman
- Principal: Ed Trifonoff
- Teaching staff: 23.90 (on an FTE basis)
- Grades: 9-12
- Enrollment: 181 (2023–2024)
- Student to teacher ratio: 7.57
- Colors: Scarlet and Gray
- Athletics conference: Ohio Valley Athletic Conference
- Team name: Pilots
- Rival: Magnolia Blue Eagles, Monroe Central Seminoles
- Website: swissohio.k12.oh.us/river-high-school/

River High School is a public high school in Hannibal, Ohio, United States. It is one of three high schools in the Switzerland of Ohio Local School District. Sports teams are called the Pilots, and they compete as members of the Ohio Valley Athletic Conference. The school's athletic teams participate in Baseball, Basketball, Cross Country, Football, Golf, Softball, Bowling, Track and Field, Volleyball, and Wrestling. Student clubs and organizations include: Art Club, Fellowship of Christian Students, French Club, National Honor Society, Spanish Club, Ski Club; among others.

== Ohio High School Athletic Association State Championships ==
- Boys Baseball – 1940*, 1963*

* Titles won by Powhatan High School prior to merging into River High School.
