= Cheshire, Ohio =

- Village
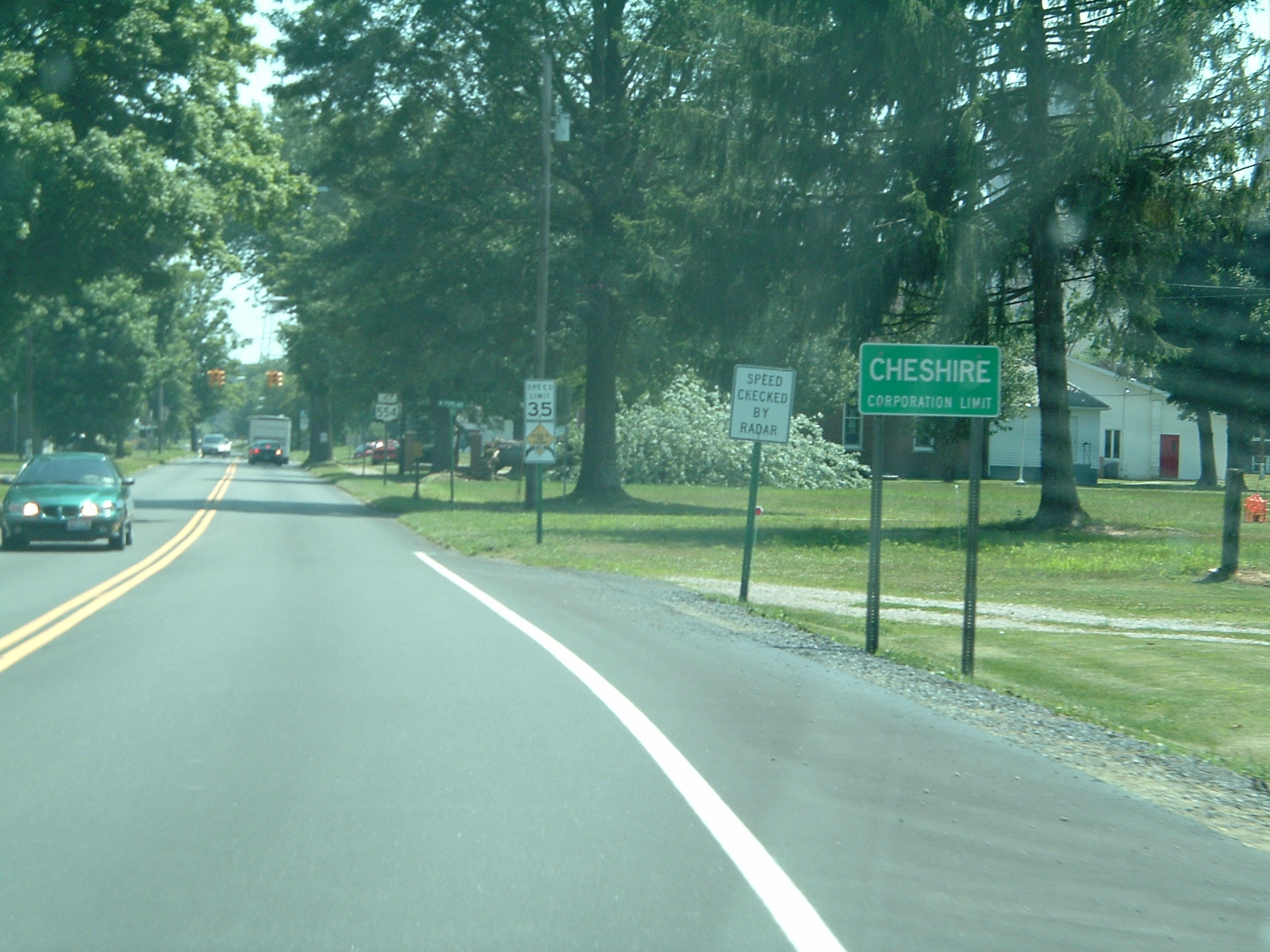
- Cheshire, 2004

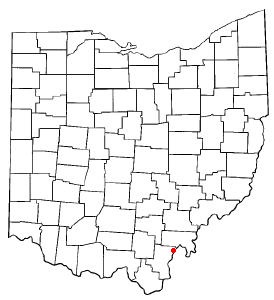
- Location of Cheshire, Ohio

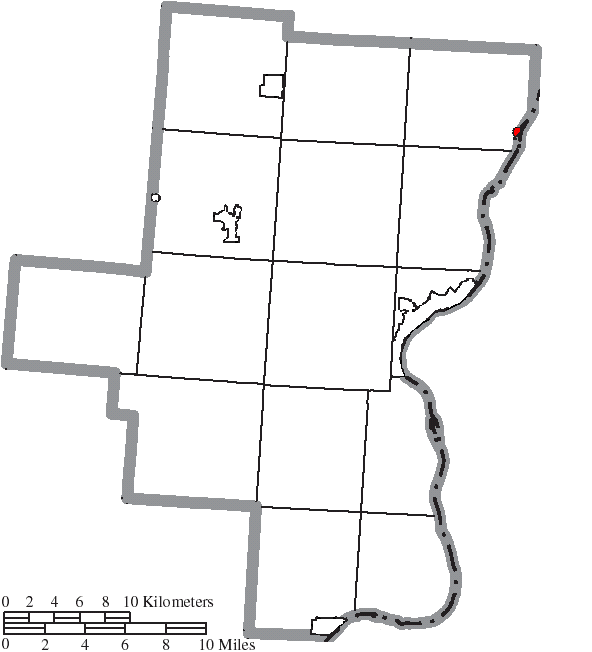
- Location of Cheshire in Gallia County
- Coordinates: 38°57′01″N 82°06′47″W
- Country: United States
- State: Ohio
- County: Gallia
- Township: Cheshire

Government
  - Mayor: Mark Coleman

Area
  - Total: 0.78 sq mi (2.03 km^{2})
  - Land: 0.77 sq mi (2.00 km^{2})
  - Water: 0.012 sq mi (0.03 km^{2})
- Elevation: 561 ft (171 m)

Population (2020)
  - Total: 123
  - Estimate (2023): 124
  - Density: 159.7/sq mi (61.65/km^{2})
- Time zone: UTC-5 (Eastern (EST))
  - Summer (DST): UTC-4 (EDT)
- ZIP code: 45620
- Area code: 740
- FIPS code: 39-13932
- GNIS feature ID: 2397615

Cheshire (/ˈtʃɛʃər/ CHESH-ər) is a village in Gallia County, Ohio, United States, along the Ohio River. The population was 123 at the 2020 census. It is part of the rural Point Pleasant micropolitan area.

== History ==
Cheshire, Ohio, was named for the county of Cheshire in England. It was founded in 1811.

=== Town buyout by American Electric Power ===
By 2000, the village was plagued by toxic sulfurous gas clouds and acid rain from the nearby coal-fired Gavin Power Plant. Residents hired lawyers requesting a buyout. The plant's owner, American Electric Power (AEP), investigated the claims and found that no long-term injuries/illnesses resulted from the cloud but decided it could use the land to expand plant property for future technologies. In 2002, AEP reached a settlement with residents that was effectively a $20 million buyout. Most of the 221 residents agreed to leave the town and absolve the company from future property or health claims, while some remain through either deals with the company or refusal to sell their property. The company announced plans to demolish the existing structures and construct a dock facility for coal barges, but has not yet begun work on constructing them.

In 2004, the remaining villagers of Cheshire and residents of the surrounding area took steps to expand the village limits by annexing properties within about a mile north and west of the previous village limits.

== Geography ==
According to the United States Census Bureau, the village has a total area of 0.78 square miles (2.02 km^{2}), of which 0.77 square miles (1.99 km^{2}) is land and 0.01 square miles (0.03 km^{2}) is water.

== Demographics ==
Historical population
Census	Pop.	Note	%±
1870	276		—
1960	369		—
1970	315		−14.6%
1980	297		−5.7%
1990	250		−15.8%
2000	221		−11.6%
2010	132		−40.3%
2020	123		−6.8%
2023 (est.)	124	▲	0.8%
U.S. Decennial Census

=== 2010 census ===
As of the census of 2010, there were 132 people, 67 households, and 36 families living in the village. The population density was 171.4 inhabitants per square mile (66.2/km^{2}). There were 76 housing units at an average density of 98.7 per square mile (38.1/km^{2}). The racial makeup of the village was 96.2% White, 0.8% African American, 2.3% from other races, and 0.8% from two or more races. Hispanic or Latino of any race were 1.5% of the population.

There were 67 households, of which 17.9% had children under the age of 18 living with them, 44.8% were married couples living together, 4.5% had a female householder with no husband present, 4.5% had a male householder with no wife present, and 46.3% were non-families. 41.8% of all households were made up of individuals, and 20.9% had someone living alone who was 65 years of age or older. The average household size was 1.97 and the average family size was 2.67.

The median age in the village was 52 years. 15.2% of residents were under the age of 18; 6.9% were between the ages of 18 and 24; 16.6% were from 25 to 44; 37.1% were from 45 to 64; and 24.2% were 65 years of age or older. The gender makeup of the village was 53.0% male and 47.0% female.

=== 2000 census ===
As of the census of 2000, there were 221 people, 93 households, and 59 families living in the village. The population density was 1,201.2 inhabitants per square mile (463.8/km^{2}). There were 110 housing units at an average density of 597.9 per square mile (230.9/km^{2}). The racial makeup of the village was 98.19% White, 1.36% African American and 0.45% Native American.

There were 93 households, out of which 29.0% had children under the age of 18 living with them, 53.8% were married couples living together, 6.5% had a female householder with no husband present, and 35.5% were non-families. 33.3% of all households were made up of individuals, and 18.3% had someone living alone who was 65 years of age or older. The average household size was 2.38 and the average family size was 3.05.

In the village, the population was spread out, with 25.8% under the age of 18, 7.7% from 18 to 24, 25.8% from 25 to 44, 24.0% from 45 to 64, and 16.7% who were 65 years of age or older. The median age was 40 years. For every 100 females, there were 93.9 males. For every 100 females age 18 and over, there were 95.2 males.

The median income for a household in the village was $30,179, and the median income for a family was $31,786. Males had a median income of $31,250 versus $21,667 for females. The per capita income for the village was $13,926. About 11.4% of families and 12.4% of the population were below the poverty line, including 23.8% of those under the age of 18 and none of those 65 or over.

== Education ==
Public education in the village of Cheshire is provided by the Gallia County Local School District.

== Notable people ==
- Frank Cremeans, U.S. Representative from Ohio
- Emma Rowena (Caldwell) Gatewood, known as "Grandma Gatewood", first woman to solo thru-hike the Appalachian Trail
- Harvey V. Higley, businessman
- Wendell Holmes (actor), American actor

== Gallery ==
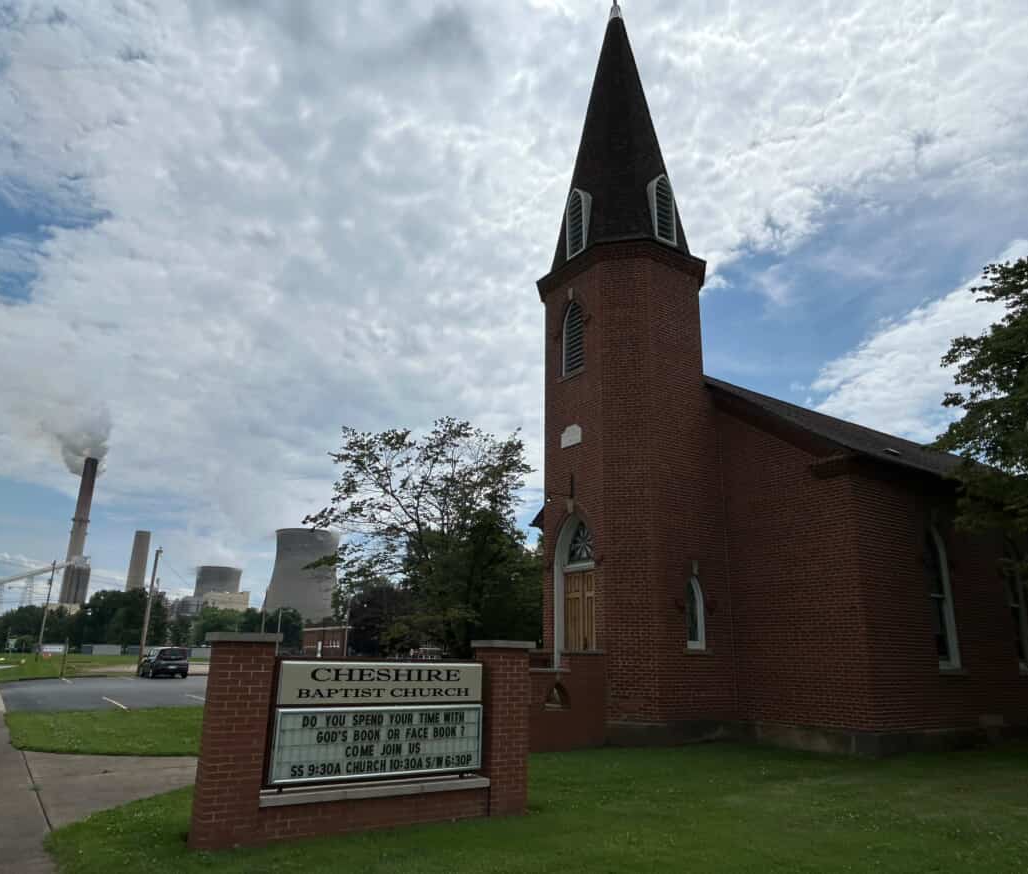
Cheshire Baptist Church, with smoke stacks in the background, in 2025.

== See also ==
- List of cities and towns along the Ohio River
