= Symmes Creek =

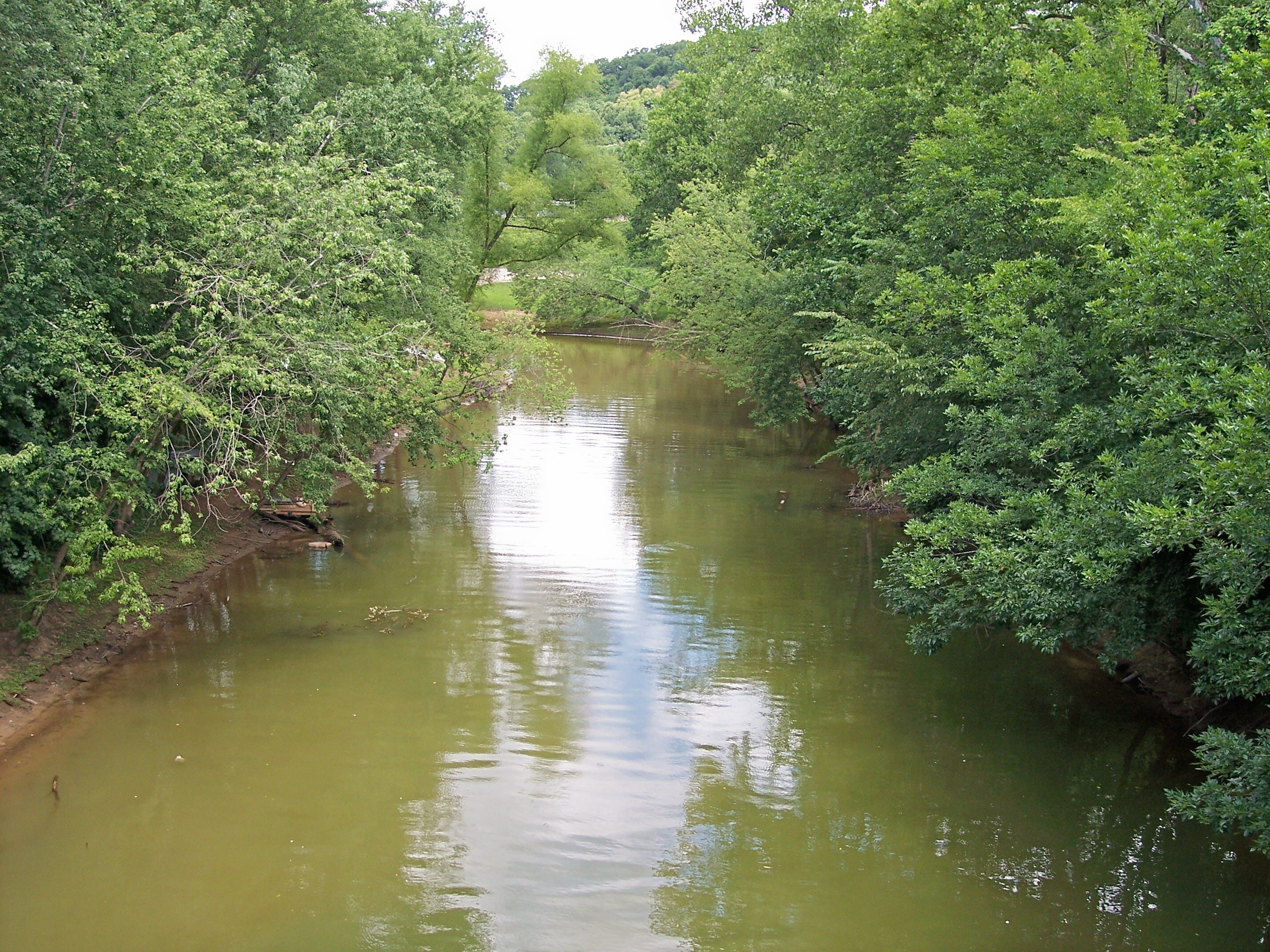
- Symmes Creek near its mouth in Chesapeake in 2007

- Location of the mouth of Symmes Creek in Chesapeake, Ohio

Location
- Country: United States
- State: Ohio

Physical characteristics
- Source
  - location: Bloomfield Township, Jackson County
  - coordinates: 38°59′38″N 82°33′00″W
  - elevation: 740 ft (230 m)
- Mouth: Ohio River
  - location: Chesapeake
  - coordinates: 38°25′38″N 82°26′58″W
  - elevation: 518 ft (158 m)
- Length: 76 mi (122 km)
- Basin size: 357 mi^{2} (920 km^{2})
- Discharge
  - location: Aid
  - average: 426 cu ft/s (12.1 m^{3}/s)
  - minimum: 1 cu ft/s (0.028 m^{3}/s)
  - maximum: 7,100 cu ft/s (200 m^{3}/s)

Symmes Creek is a 76.4-mile-long (123.0 km) tributary of the Ohio River in southern Ohio in the United States. Via the Ohio River, it is part of the watershed of the Mississippi River, draining an area of 357 square miles (920 km^{2}) on the unglaciated portion of the Allegheny Plateau.

Symmes Creek rises in Bloomfield Township in southeastern Jackson County and flows generally southward through Madison Township in Jackson County; Greenfield, Perry, and Walnut townships in Gallia County; and Symmes, Aid, Mason, Lawrence, Windsor, and Union townships in Lawrence County, through a portion of the Ironton Unit of the Wayne National Forest and past the communities of Waterloo, Aid, and Willow Wood. It joins the Ohio River at the village of Chesapeake, opposite downtown Huntington, West Virginia.

The United States Board on Geographic Names settled on "Symmes Creek" as the stream's name in 1902. According to the Geographic Names Information System, it has also been known historically as "Simms," "Big Creek," and "Symms Creek."

== Flow rate ==
At the United States Geological Survey's stream gauge in Aid, the annual mean flow of Symmes Creek between November 2000 and September 2005 was 426 cubic feet per second (12.1 m^{3}/s). The highest recorded flow during the period was 7,100 cu ft/s (200 m^{3}/s) on May 19, 2001. The lowest recorded flow was 1 cu ft/s (0.028 m^{3}/s) on September 18, 2001.

== See also ==
- List of rivers of Ohio
