= Rock Hill High School (Ohio) =

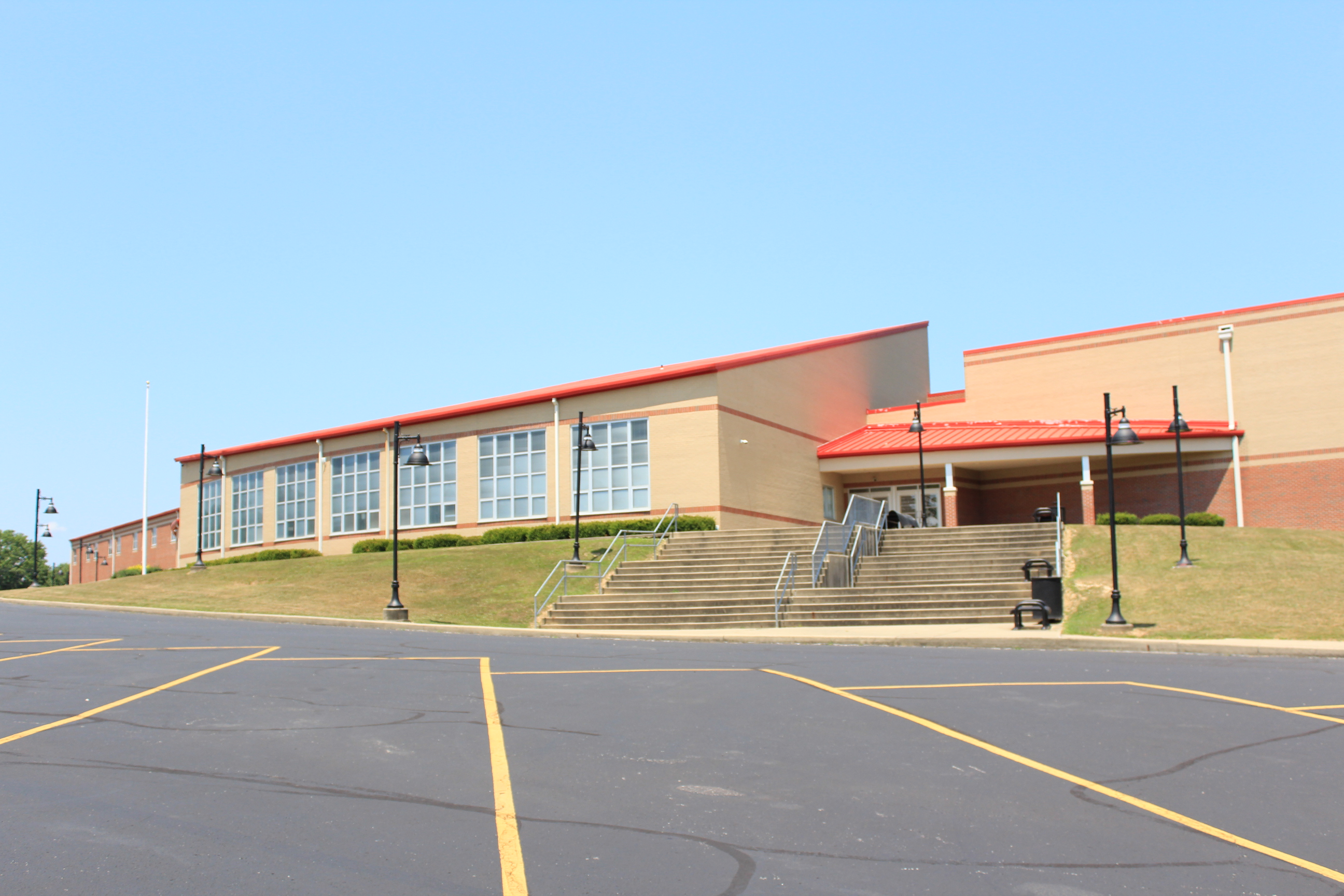

Location
- 2415 County Road 26; Ironton, (Lawrence County), Ohio 45638; United States
- Coordinates: 38°36′49″N 82°39′31″W

Information
- Type: Public, Coeducational high school
- Established: 1949
- School district: Rock Hill Local School District
- Superintendent: Dave Hopper
- Grades: 9-12
- Colors: Red and White
- Slogan: Tank McFann
- Fight song: RHHS Fight Song
- Athletics conference: Ohio Valley Conference
- Sports: Football, Track and Field, Baseball, Softball, Cross Country, Volleyball, Basketball.
- Mascot: Indian Chief (Wampum)
- Nickname: Redmen
- Team name: Rock Hill
- Rivals: Dawson-Bryant (Hornets), Oak Hill (Oaks)
- Athletic Director: Mark Lutz Jerry Kidd
- Website: http://www.rockhill.org

Rock Hill High School (RHHS) is a rural, public high school near Ironton, Ohio. It is officially called Rock Hill Senior High School. It is the only high school in the Rock Hill Local School District. The high school is a four-year school, offering grades 9-12. Their nickname is the Redmen, and their mascot is an Indian Chieftain. Its official colors are red and white.

== Brief history ==
The Rock Hill Local School District formerly consisted of four separate school districts, which were located in the towns of Decatur, Hanging Rock, Kitts Hill, and Pedro. Hanging Rock, Kitts Hill, and Pedro consolidated in 1949. Consolidation went somewhat smoothly, with the new school taking something from each of the old. 'Rock' from Hanging Rock, 'Hill' from Kitt's Hill, the 'Redmen' from Pedro, as well as the location in Pedro. Decatur Township schools joined in 1965. New schools were recently built and opened in 2002.

The official name of the school is Rock Hill Senior High School, however, in many instances it drops the 'Senior'; and it is mostly used ceremonially, for graduations and business. The reasoning for this is that the school used to feature 10-12 grades, and the junior high school featured 7-9. After the changes made by the Board of Education, the high school added ninth grade and the junior high added the sixth grade. The junior high school changed its name officially to "Rock Hill Middle School," but the high school never followed suit. There are several reasons behind this, being that it is the only high school in the country to have the name, (there are other Rock Hill High Schools, but there are no other Rock Hill Senior High Schools), as well as tradition.

== Athletics ==
Rock Hill High School is a founding member of the Ohio Valley Conference. Currently, the other members of the conference include Chesapeake High School (Panthers), Coal Grove Dawson-Bryant High School (Hornets), Proctorville Fairland High School (Dragons), South Point High School (Pointers), Ironton High School (Fighting Tigers), Portsmouth High School (Trojans) Gallia Academy High School (Blue Devils). The traditional rivals have been Coal Grove High School (Hornets), neighboring Oak Hill High School (Oaks).

Rock Hill High School, according to the Ohio High School Athletic Association (OHSAA), presently participates in the following athletics: boys' baseball, boys' and girls' basketball, boys' and girls' cross country, cheerleading, football, boys' golf, fast-pitch softball, boys' and girls' track and field, girls’ and boys’ soccer, and girls' volleyball.

Recently, in 2007, the softball team won the OVC title and sectional championship. The softball team also won the sectional title in 2005, and 2009. The girls track team won an OVC title in 2006.

Soccer

Rock Hill soccer was first created in 2016 as a coed team. After winning OVC in 2017, a girls team was created in 2018 and was coached by Summer Wheatley. The Boys team is coached by Luke Simpson. After being only a second year program, the girls team won their first OVC championship in 2019 and did it again in 2020, making them back-to-back champions. The boys were also back-to-back champions in 2017 and 2018.

Baseball

In 2011, the boys baseball team won the OVC Championship. They continued their success by winning the OVC in 2012 and 2013 also. In 2013, the Redmen achieved a 17-6 record and played in the District Championship game at Paints Stadium in Chillicothe, Ohio.

Basketball

In 1999 the Runnin' Redmen were led to a 19-4 season and to the District Championship Game at the Convocation Center of Ohio University in Athens, Ohio, against the Portsmouth Trojans, by coach Rick Scarberry. Making this only the second Redmen team to reach this far in the playoffs, the other also led by Scarberry.

Football

In 2005, the football team won the OVC Championship and qualified to play in the OHSAA playoffs. The 1995 football team recorded the most wins in school history with a 10-2 record and also qualified for the school's first OHSAA Playoff appearance. The 1995 football team appeared in the OHSAA Regional Finals vs. Ironton High School. The 1995 team along with the 2020 team are the only teams to record OHSAA playoff wins. The 1953 football squad is the only undefeated football team in school history, with a record of 9-0. The 1953 team were crowned champions of the Lawrence County League (predating the OVC). The football team has qualified for the OHSAA state playoffs in 1995, 2003, 2005, 2007, 2015, 2020. .

== Band Program ==
Dubbed locally as "The Pride of Lawrence County", the Rock Hill High School Marching Band is one of the premier marching band groups in Southern Ohio. The band holds many firsts and records across Southern Ohio and in Lawrence County. The Rock Hill High School Marching has qualified for O.M.E.A State Marching Band Competitions more times than any other school in Lawrence County, qualifying a grand total of 27 years. Rock Hill's Marching Band was also the first in Lawrence County to ever qualify for state marching band finals, the first to qualify for state concert band finals, the first to receive an overall Superior rating at state marching band finals, and is one of only two schools in the county to ever receive an overall Superior rating at state concert band finals. The band performs at O.M.E.A competitions, K.M.E.A competitions, locally adjudicated competitions in West Virginia, and in the past has performed at BOA competitions.

== Other activities ==
Students also participate in other activities not sanctioned by the OHSAA, or athletics not officially recognized by the school board and athletic boosters. The vast majority of these clubs focus on academics as well as community service. These activities or clubs include:

- Band
- Bowling
- Chorus
- Show Choir
- Theater
- Envirothon
- FCCLA
- National Honor Society
- Prom Committee
- Project Lead the Way
- Quiz Bowl
- S.C.O.R.E.S.(academic competition)
- Spanish Club
- Special Olympics
- Science Club
- Art Club

== Notes and references ==
- - Rock Hill Board of Education member list
- - 'The Pride of Lawrence County'
- - OHSAA Member Directory & List of Activities/Coaches
- - School of Promise Awardees
