= Hanging Rock Ponds =

- Location within Ohio
- Interactive map of Hanging Rock Ponds
- Location: Wayne National Forest; Lawrence County, Ohio
- Coordinates: 38°35′N 82°43′W
- Type: Quarry lakes
- Primary inflows: Natural
- Basin countries: United States
- Managing agency: U.S. Forestry Service
- Designation: Protected
- Built: 1960s
- Surface elevation: 853 feet (260 m)
- Settlements: Hanging Rock, Ohio
- Website: Website
- References: U.S. Geological Survey Geographic Names Information System: Hanging Rock Ponds

The Hanging Rock Ponds are a set of quarry ponds near Hanging Rock, a village along the Ohio River in western Lawrence County, Ohio, United States. The ponds are the result of strip mining, or surface mining for iron ore or coal during the 1960s and 1970s. Hanging Rock Ponds have a total of 51 ponds, scattered throughout a 5,000 acres (2,023 ha) national reserve. This area is part of the Wayne National Forest, Ohio's only national forest. Fishing of these ponds is allowed and are regularly stocked with game fish ranging from catfish, bluegill, and bass.

This area has 24 miles (39 km) of trail used for off-road vehicles, hiking, and mountain biking.
