= Miller, Ohio =

- Census-designated place
- Location within Ohio Location within the United States
- Coordinates: 38°31′57″N 82°18′22″W
- Country: United States
- State: Ohio
- County: Lawrence
- Township: Rome

Area
  - Total: 1.02 sq mi (2.64 km^{2})
  - Land: 0.99 sq mi (2.57 km^{2})
  - Water: 0.027 sq mi (0.07 km^{2})
- Elevation: 565 ft (172 m)

Population (2020)
  - Total: 455
  - Density: 459.0/sq mi (177.22/km^{2})
- Time zone: UTC-5 (Eastern (EST))
  - Summer (DST): UTC-4 (EDT)
- ZIP Code: 45623 (Crown City)
- Area codes: 740/220
- FIPS code: 39-50344
- GNIS feature ID: 2812824

Miller is an unincorporated community and census-designated place (CDP) in Lawrence County, Ohio, United States, along the Ohio River. It was first listed as a CDP prior to the 2020 census. The population was 455 at the 2020 census.

The CDP is in southeastern Lawrence County, in Rome Township. It sits on the west bank of the Ohio River and is bordered to the south by the village of Athalia. Ohio State Route 7 (Market Street) passes through the center of the community, leading north (upriver) 25 miles (40 km) to Gallipolis and southwest (downriver) 13 miles (21 km) to Chesapeake, across from Huntington, West Virginia. State Route 217 leads west from Miller 6 miles (10 km) to Scottown.

== Demographics ==
Historical population
Census	Pop.	Note	%±
2020	455		—
U.S. Decennial Census
