= Decatur Township, Ohio =

Decatur Township, Ohio, may refer to:

- Decatur Township, Lawrence County, Ohio
- Decatur Township, Washington County, Ohio
