= Symmes Township, Ohio =

Symmes Township, Ohio may refer to:

- Symmes Township, Hamilton County, Ohio
- Symmes Township, Lawrence County, Ohio
