= Upper Township =

Upper Township may refer to the following townships in the United States:

- Upper Township, New Jersey in Cape May County
- Upper Township, Lawrence County, Ohio
