= Rock Hill Local School District =

School district in Ohio, United States

Address
- 2325A County Road 26 Ironton, Ohio, 45638; United States
- Coordinates: 38°31′51″N 82°40′42″W

District information
- Type: Public
- Grades: PK–12
- Established: 1949; 77 years ago
- Superintendent: Glenn D. Hopper
- Schools: 3
- NCES District ID: 3904794

Students and staff
- Students: 1,345 (2024–2025)
- Teachers: 97.00 (on an FTE basis) (2024–2025)
- Staff: 131.00 (on an FTE basis) (2024–2025)
- Student–teacher ratio: 13.87 (2024–2025)

Other information
- Website: www.rockhill.org

The Rock Hill Local School District is a local school district in Ohio. The central location for its offices and school campuses is just outside Ironton, Ohio. It currently operates four schools: the Rock Hill Child Development Center (Pre-K), the Rock Hill Elementary School (K-5), the Rock Hill Middle School (6-8), and the Rock Hill Senior High School (9-12).

The district is one of the largest (by geographical square mileage) in the state, and it serves several communities including portions of the townships of Aid, Decatur, Elizabeth, Hamilton, Lawrence, Perry, Symmes, Washington and Upper, along with the village of Hanging Rock and the unincorporated communities of Kitts Hill and Pedro as well as certain areas of the city of Ironton. The district also accepts open enrollment students from adjacent school districts.

As of 2023, the enrollment (or 'average daily membership') of the district was 1,281; the current attendance rate was 92.0%; and the graduation rate was 92.6%, which is well above the percentage the state wants a district to achieve.

The official colors for the district are red and white. The official nickname for the school's activities is the Redmen and their mascot is Chief Wampum.

== History ==
The Rock Hill Local School District formerly consisted of four separate school districts located in the towns of Decatur, Hanging Rock, Kitts Hill, and Pedro. Hanging Rock, Kitts Hill, and Pedro consolidated in 1949. Consolidation went somewhat smoothly, with the new school taking something from each of the old. The name is a combination of elements from Hanging Rock ('Rock') and Kitt's Hill ('Hill"). The 'Redmen' nickname is indicative of the school name 'Pedro' as well as from the school's location in Pedro, Ohio. In 1965, the Decatur Township schools consolidated into the district as well, with new and elementary and high school buildings being added more recently in 2002.

== Administration ==
David Hopper is the superintendent of the Rock Hill Local School District, along with Assistant Superintendent Kathy Bowling. The Rock Hill Local School District Board of Education members include Mark Harper, Shane Hackworth, Chad Pemberton, Dennis Hankins, and Phillip Bailey. The treasurer is Chris Robinson. Building principals include Fred L. Evans at the elementary, Jason Owens at the middle school, and Dean Nance at the high school.

== Current and Former buildings ==
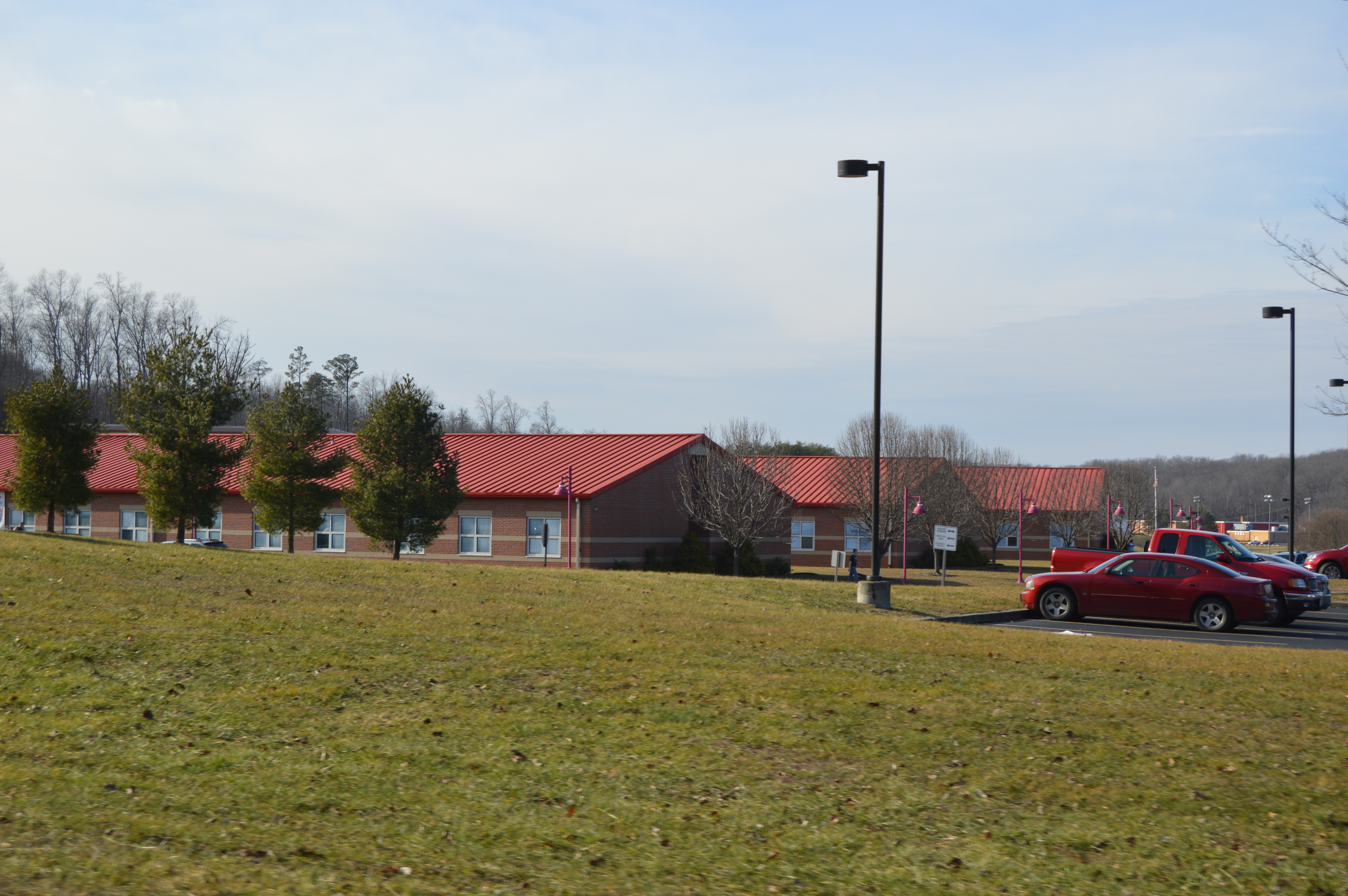
Rock Hill Elementary School

The current buildings in the district include the Rock Hill Child Development Center (Pre-K), Rock Hill Elementary School (K-5), Rock Hill Middle School (6-8), and Rock Hill High School (9-12). The Child Development Center is open to the public; however, you must pay to attend.

The former buildings include Rock Hill Elementary No. 1 - It was located in Decatur Township. It was consolidated in 2002 to form one Rock Hill Elementary School. The school served students in the Decatur and Washington Townships.

Rock Hill Elementary No. 2 - It was located in Kitts Hill. It was consolidated in 2002 to form one Rock Hill Elementary School. It served students in Kitts Hill and parts of Aid, Lawrence, Perry, and Symmes Townships. The building was sold to Sugar Creek Missionary Baptist Church in Kitts Hill, and it has since been turned into a Bible College and K-12 Christian school.

Rock Hill Elementary No. 3 - It was located just outside Ironton. It was consolidated in 2002 to form one Rock Hill Elementary School. It provided for students living in the areas of Pedro and Elizabeth and Upper Townships, as well as portions of the city of Ironton. The new Rock Hill campus was based around this site, and the current renovated building houses the Child Development Center and the Board of Education administrative offices.

Rock Hill Elementary No. 4 - It was located in Hanging Rock. Similar to the other buildings, it was consolidated in 2002 to form one Rock Hill Elementary School. Before consolidation, this served as both the district's site for elementary handicapped children as well as regular education for the students of Hanging Rock, portions of the city of Ironton, and Hamilton Township area. It was purchased by Ohio University Southern Campus (Ironton), and is serving as their child development center.

Rock Hill Junior High School - It served grades 7-9 before becoming Rock Hill Middle School and also incorporating the sixth grade from the elementary schools and giving the senior high school the ninth grade. It provided education for all 7-9 students in the district. The building was purchased by Mended Reeds in 2006 and served as a juvenile correction facility. The building was then purchased by the Lawrence County (OH) Dennis J. Boll Group Home in 2009, and will serve the county's juvenile detention needs.

== District Sports ==
Rock Hill's Athletic Director is Mark Lutz.

Boy Activities-The school has many extracurricular activities including the following: Rock Hill Little League Baseball; Rock Hill High School Junior Varsity and Varsity baseball; Rock Hill Youth Football league which includes 2-6 grade levels; High School Varsity and Junior Varsity Football; Cross Country for grades 7-12; Track and Field for middle school grades 7 and 8 and for high school 9-12.; high and middle school varsity and junior varsity basketball. They also have youth basketball for the 2-6 grade levels and middle school basketball grades 7 and 8. Co-ed soccer is offered in both middle school and high school.

Girl Activities- The School has Youth Softball leagues the leads up to Junior Varsity and Varsity softball. And Rock Hill has High School and Middle School Junior Varsity and Varsity Volleyball. The school has Basketball teams for girls in middle school and in high school. Cross Country for grades 7-12. Rock Hill has a girls track team for high school and middle school. The school also has a cheerleading team that cheer at the football and basketball games. Co-ed soccer is offered in both middle school and high school.

Rock Hill is a part of the (OVC) Ohio Valley Conference.
