= Etna, Lawrence County, Ohio =

Unincorporated community in Ohio, U.S.

Coordinates: 38°37′30″N 82°39′08″W

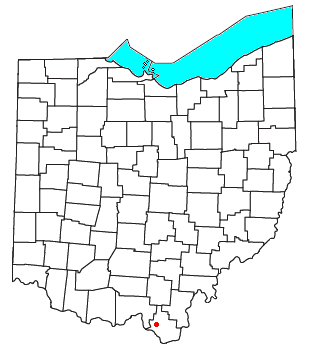
Location of Etna in Lawrence County, Ohio

Etna (formerly Pedro, Aetna Furnace, and Etna Furnace) is an unincorporated community in eastern Elizabeth Township, Lawrence County, Ohio, United States. It lies at an elevation of 630 feet.
