= Union Township, Lawrence County, Ohio =

Township in Ohio, US

- Township
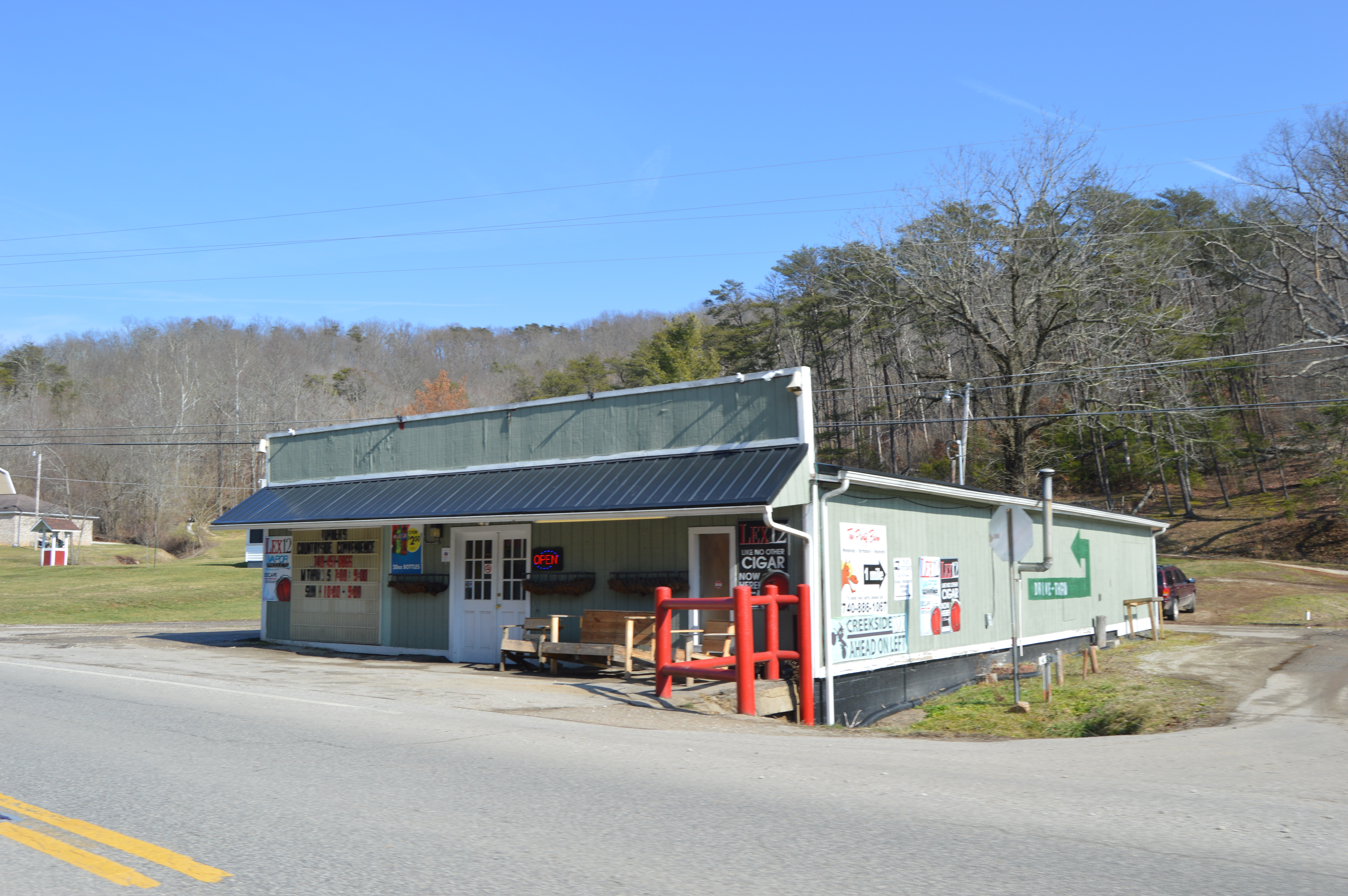
- Country store on State Route 775 at Five Mile Creek

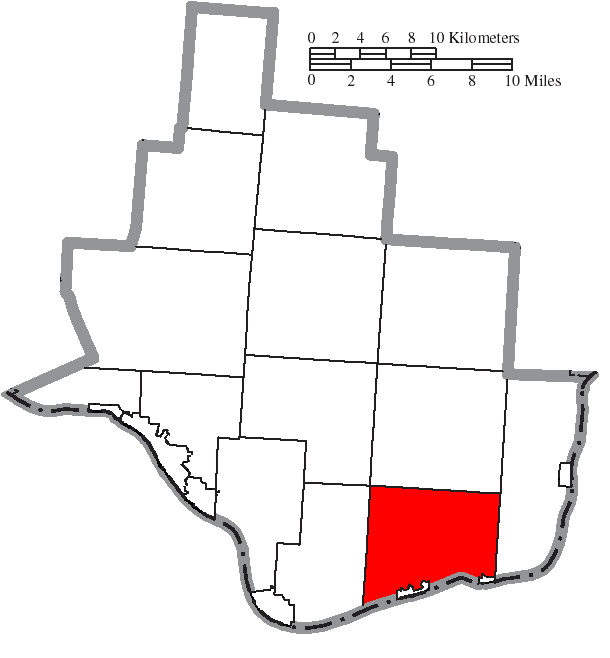
- Location of Union Township in Lawrence County
- Coordinates: 38°26′55″N 82°25′53″W
- Country: United States
- State: Ohio
- County: Lawrence

Area
  - Total: 32.57 sq mi (84.35 km^{2})
  - Land: 31.98 sq mi (82.84 km^{2})
  - Water: 0.58 sq mi (1.51 km^{2})
- Elevation: 590 ft (180 m)

Population (2020)
  - Total: 8,411
  - Density: 263.0/sq mi (101.5/km^{2})
- Time zone: UTC-5 (Eastern (EST))
  - Summer (DST): UTC-4 (EDT)
- FIPS code: 39-78372
- GNIS feature ID: 1086448

Union Township is one of the fourteen townships of Lawrence County, Ohio, United States. As of the 2020 census the population was 8,411.

== Geography ==
Located in the southeastern part of the county along the Ohio River, it borders the following townships:

- Windsor Township – north
- Rome Township – east
- Fayette Township – west
- Lawrence Township – northwest corner

Cabell County, West Virginia, lies across the Ohio River to the south.

It is located upstream of most of the rest of Lawrence County's Ohio River townships.

Two villages are located along the shoreline of Union Township: Proctorville far upstream, and Chesapeake in the center.

== Name and history ==
It is one of twenty-seven Union Townships statewide.

In the early Northwest Territory era, waterways were the nation’s highways. According to Lawrence County Register, Union Township, with its waterway resources, boasted a grist mill and blacksmith shop on Symmes Creek.

== Government ==
The township is governed by a three-member board of trustees, who are elected in November of odd-numbered years to a four-year term beginning on the following January 1. Two are elected in the year after the presidential election and one is elected in the year before it. There is also an elected township fiscal officer, who serves a four-year term beginning on April 1 of the year after the election, which is held in November of the year before the presidential election. Vacancies in the fiscal officership or on the board of trustees are filled by the remaining trustees. Township officials are:

- Dain Spears, Trustee
- Cole Webb, Trustee
- Jason Forbush, Trustee
- Shelly Pinkerman, Fiscal Officer
