= Hanging Rock, Ohio =

- Village
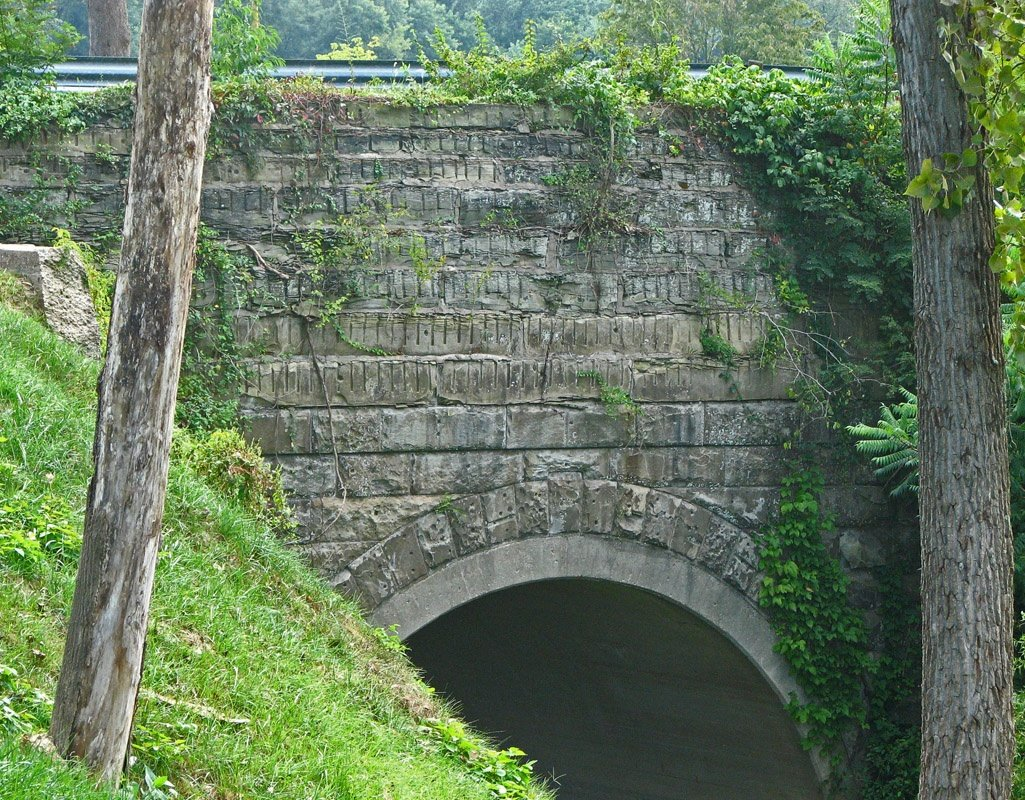
- Stone arch bridge over Osborne Run

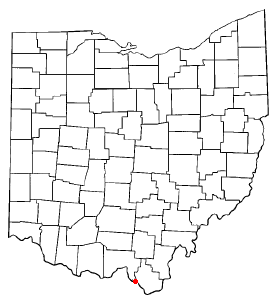
- Location of Hanging Rock, Ohio

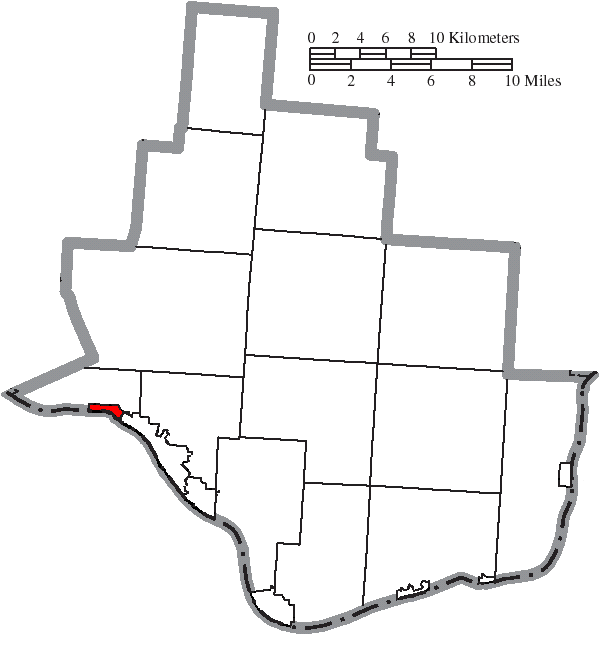
- Location of Hanging Rock in Lawrence County
- Coordinates: 38°33′36″N 82°43′39″W
- Country: United States
- State: Ohio
- County: Lawrence
- Township: Hamilton

Area
  - Total: 0.64 sq mi (1.66 km^{2})
  - Land: 0.56 sq mi (1.44 km^{2})
  - Water: 0.085 sq mi (0.22 km^{2})
- Elevation: 545 ft (166 m)

Population (2020)
  - Total: 204
  - Estimate (2024): 193
  - Density: 366.7/sq mi (141.57/km^{2})
- Time zone: UTC-5 (Eastern (EST))
  - Summer (DST): UTC-4 (EDT)
- ZIP code: 45638
- Area code: 740
- FIPS code: 39-33194
- GNIS feature ID: 2398238

Hanging Rock is a village in Lawrence County, Ohio, United States, along the Ohio River. The population was 204 at the 2020 census.

Hanging Rock is a part of the Huntington-Ashland, WV-KY-OH, Metropolitan Statistical Area (MSA).

== History ==
Hanging Rock had its start in 1820 when European Americans built a blast furnace at the site. Village development followed as workers came to the furnace. The village takes its name from a nearby cliff. The village reached its peak population in 1890. Industrial changes reduced the need for labor, and people gradually left for work elsewhere.

== Geography ==
According to the United States Census Bureau, the village has a total area of 0.65 square miles (1.68 km^{2}), of which 0.56 square miles (1.45 km^{2}) is land and 0.09 square miles (0.23 km^{2}) is water.

The Hanging Rock Recreational Area and the Hanging Rock Ponds are located near the village.

== Demographics ==
Historical population
| Census | Pop. | Note | %± |
|---|---|---|---|
| 1880 | 624 | | — |
| 1890 | 846 | | 35.6% |
| 1900 | 665 | | −21.4% |
| 1910 | 662 | | −0.5% |
| 1920 | 591 | | −10.7% |
| 1930 | 550 | | −6.9% |
| 1940 | 481 | | −12.5% |
| 1950 | 465 | | −3.3% |
| 1960 | 352 | | −24.3% |
| 1970 | 278 | | −21.0% |
| 1980 | 353 | | 27.0% |
| 1990 | 306 | | −13.3% |
| 2000 | 279 | | −8.8% |
| 2010 | 221 | | −20.8% |
| 2020 | 204 | | −7.7% |
| 2024 (est.) | 193 | ▼ | −5.4% |
U.S. Decennial Census

=== 2010 census ===
As of the census of 2010, there were 221 people, 95 households, and 68 families living in the village. The population density was 394.6 inhabitants per square mile (152.4/km^{2}). There were 102 housing units at an average density of 182.1 per square mile (70.3/km^{2}). The racial makeup of the village was 98.6% White and 1.4% from two or more races. Hispanic or Latino of any race were 1.4% of the population.

There were 95 households, of which 23.2% had children under the age of 18 living with them, 52.6% were married couples living together, 13.7% had a female householder with no husband present, 5.3% had a male householder with no wife present, and 28.4% were non-families. 20.0% of all households were made up of individuals, and 11.6% had someone living alone who was 65 years of age or older. The average household size was 2.33 and the average family size was 2.60.

The median age in the village was 47.4 years. 14.9% of residents were under the age of 18; 4.1% were between the ages of 18 and 24; 28.5% were from 25 to 44; 32.6% were from 45 to 64; and 19.9% were 65 years of age or older. The gender makeup of the village was 47.5% male and 52.5% female.

=== 2000 census ===
As of the census of 2000, there were 279 people, 109 households, and 75 families living in the village. The population density was 449.8 inhabitants per square mile (173.7/km^{2}). There were 117 housing units at an average density of 188.6 per square mile (72.8/km^{2}). The racial makeup of the village was 99.64% White, and 0.36% from two or more races.

There were 109 households, out of which 31.2% had children under the age of 18 living with them, 58.7% were married couples living together, 9.2% had a female householder with no husband present, and 30.3% were non-families. 27.5% of all households were made up of individuals, and 11.9% had someone living alone who was 65 years of age or older. The average household size was 2.56 and the average family size was 3.17.

In the village, the population was spread out, with 22.9% under the age of 18, 12.2% from 18 to 24, 28.7% from 25 to 44, 25.8% from 45 to 64, and 10.4% who were 65 years of age or older. The median age was 38 years. For every 100 females, there were 96.5 males. For every 100 females age 18 and over, there were 93.7 males.

The median income for a household in the village was $30,417, and the median income for a family was $38,125. Males had a median income of $30,625 versus $35,625 for females. The per capita income for the village was $14,328. About 14.5% of families and 17.0% of the population were below the poverty line, including 23.6% of those under the age of eighteen and 20.8% of those 65 or over.

== Public services ==
The residents of Hanging Rock are served by the Rock Hill Local School District and the Briggs Lawrence County Public Library in Ironton, with branches in South Point, Chesapeake, Proctorville and Willow Wood.

== See also ==
- List of cities and towns along the Ohio River
