= Symmes Township, Lawrence County, Ohio =

Township in Ohio, US

- Township
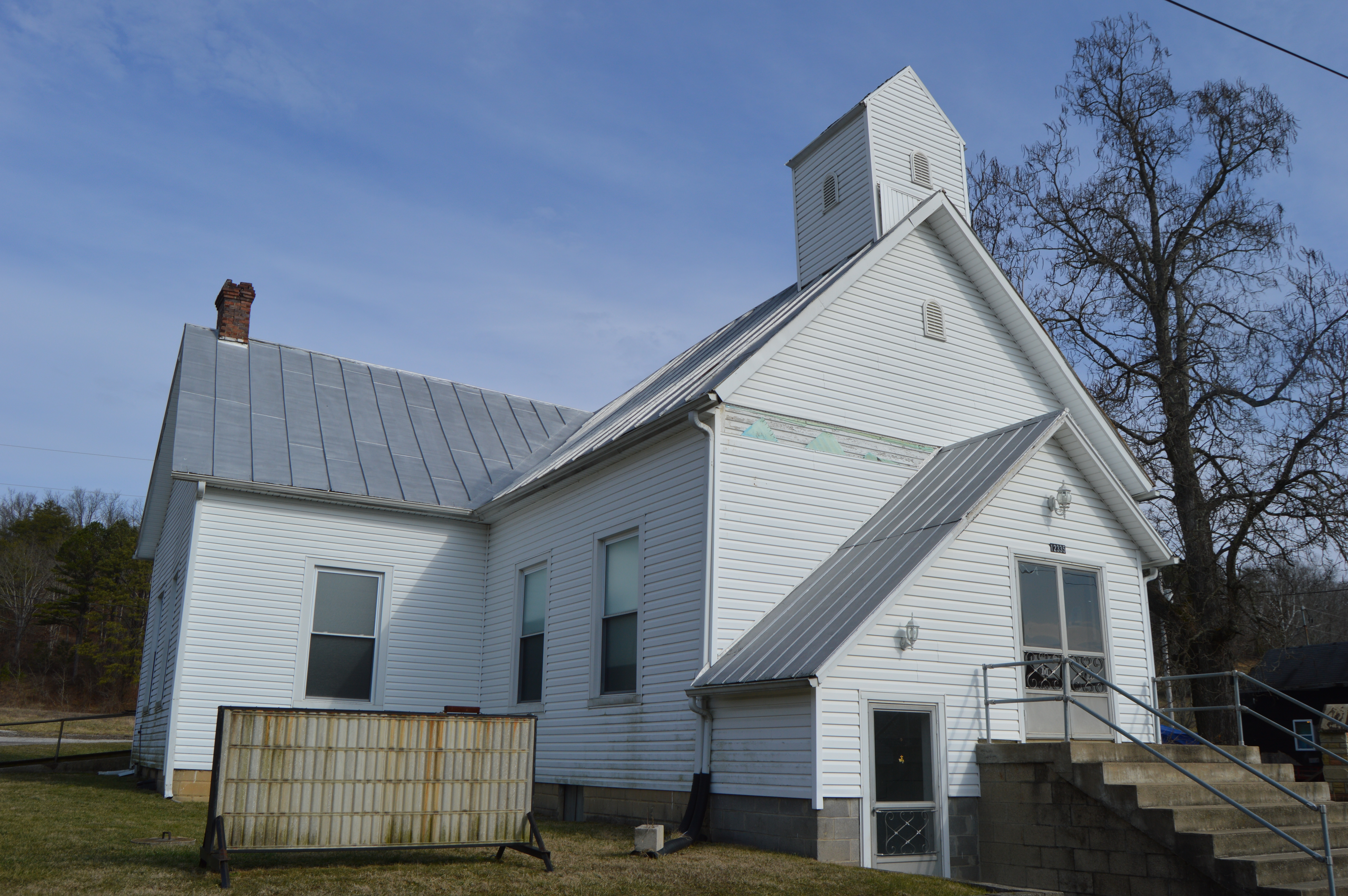
- Former Methodist church at Waterloo

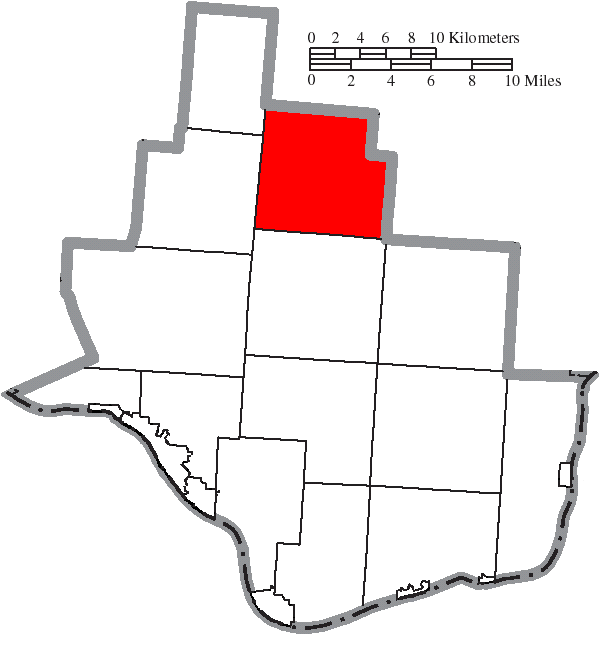
- Location of Symmes Township in Lawrence County
- Coordinates: 38°43′33″N 82°30′29″W
- Country: United States
- State: Ohio
- County: Lawrence

Area
  - Total: 37.8 sq mi (97.8 km^{2})
  - Land: 37.6 sq mi (97.5 km^{2})
  - Water: 0.12 sq mi (0.3 km^{2})
- Elevation: 814 ft (248 m)

Population (2020)
  - Total: 428
  - Density: 11.4/sq mi (4.39/km^{2})
- Time zone: UTC-5 (Eastern (EST))
  - Summer (DST): UTC-4 (EDT)
- FIPS code: 39-76031
- GNIS feature ID: 1086447

Symmes Township is one of the fourteen townships of Lawrence County, Ohio, United States. As of the 2020 census, the population was 428.

== Geography ==
Located in the northern part of the county, it borders the following townships:

- Greenfield Township, Gallia County - north
- Walnut Township, Gallia County - east
- Mason Township - southeast corner
- Aid Township - south
- Decatur Township - west
- Washington Township - northwest

No municipalities are located in Symmes Township, although the unincorporated community of Waterloo is located in the southeastern part of the township.

== Name and history ==
Symmes Township was named after John Cleves Symmes, as was Symmes Creek of this township. Statewide, the only other Symmes Township is in Hamilton County.

The first settlers organized Symmes Township and built cabins in the township in 1820. The first settlement was at the mouth of Johns Creek, with the next being on Buffalo Creek at Yates Fork (now Caulley Creek). The first school was held in the cabin of Andrew Burke on Johns Creek in 1834. There were a total of twelve students from three different townships.

The township is within Wayne National Forest. In 1989, the federal government owned 61% of the land in the township.

== Government ==
The township is governed by a three-member board of trustees, who are elected in November of odd-numbered years to a four-year term beginning on the following January 1. Two are elected in the year after the presidential election and one is elected in the year before it. There is also an elected township fiscal officer, who serves a four-year term beginning on April 1 of the year after the election, which is held in November of the year before the presidential election. Vacancies in the fiscal officership or on the board of trustees are filled by the remaining trustees.

== Education ==
The vast majority of K-12 educational services are provided to Symmes Township by the Symmes Valley Local School District, although parts of the township receive services from the Rock Hill Local School District, which also offers Pre-K education.
