= Lawrence Township, Lawrence County, Ohio =

Township in Ohio, US

- Township
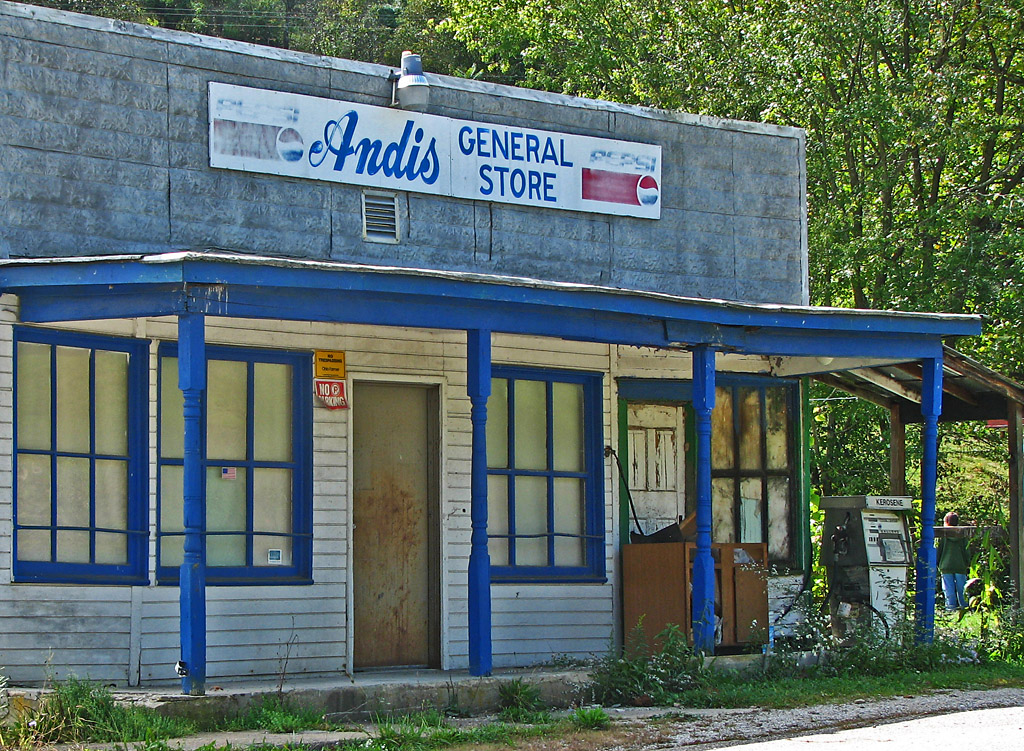
- Former Andis General Store

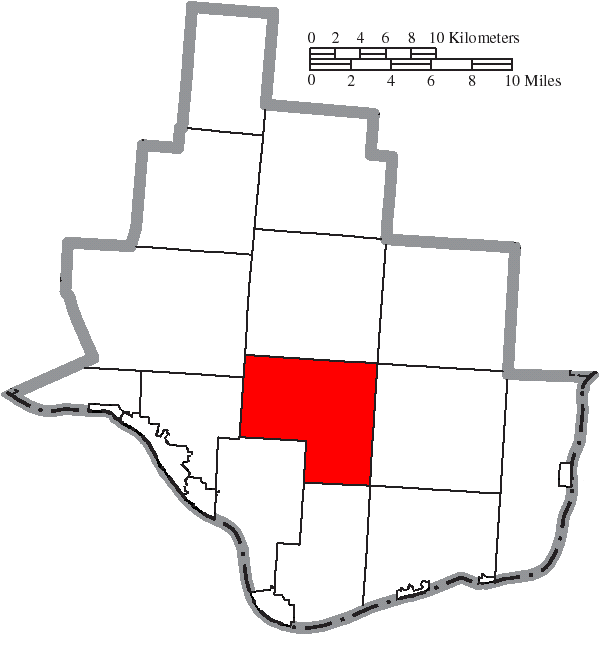
- Location of Lawrence Township in Lawrence County
- Coordinates: 38°33′26″N 82°32′57″W
- Country: United States
- State: Ohio
- County: Lawrence

Area
  - Total: 33.4 sq mi (86.4 km^{2})
  - Land: 33.3 sq mi (86.3 km^{2})
  - Water: 0.039 sq mi (0.1 km^{2})
- Elevation: 879 ft (268 m)

Population (2020)
  - Total: 2,355
  - Density: 70.7/sq mi (27.3/km^{2})
- Time zone: UTC-5 (Eastern (EST))
  - Summer (DST): UTC-4 (EDT)
- FIPS code: 39-42154
- GNIS feature ID: 1086443

Lawrence Township is one of the fourteen townships of Lawrence County, Ohio, United States. As of the 2020 census the population was 2,355.

== Geography ==
Lawrence Township is located in the central part of the county and borders the following townships:

- Aid Township - north
- Mason Township - northeast corner
- Windsor Township - east
- Union Township - southeast corner
- Fayette Township - south
- Perry Township - southwest
- Upper Township - west
- Elizabeth Township - northwest

Lawrence Township is the only township in Lawrence County without a border on another county.

No municipalities are located in Lawrence Township; however, the unincorporated communities of Andis and Kitts Hill are located in the south-central and western portions of the township, respectively.

== Name and history ==
Statewide, other Lawrence Townships are located in Stark, Tuscarawas, and Washington counties.

== Government ==
The township is governed by a three-member board of trustees, who are elected in November of odd-numbered years to a four-year term beginning on the following January 1. Two are elected in the year after the presidential election and one is elected in the year before it. There is also an elected township fiscal officer, who serves a four-year term beginning on April 1 of the year after the election, which is held in November of the year before the presidential election. Vacancies in the fiscal officership or on the board of trustees are filled by the remaining trustees.

== Education ==
The vast majority of educational services in Lawrence Township is provided by the Rock Hill Local School District (Pre-K through 12), although smaller portions are served by the Dawson-Bryant Local School District, and the Symmes Valley Local School District.
