= Rome Township, Lawrence County, Ohio =

Township in Ohio, US

- Township
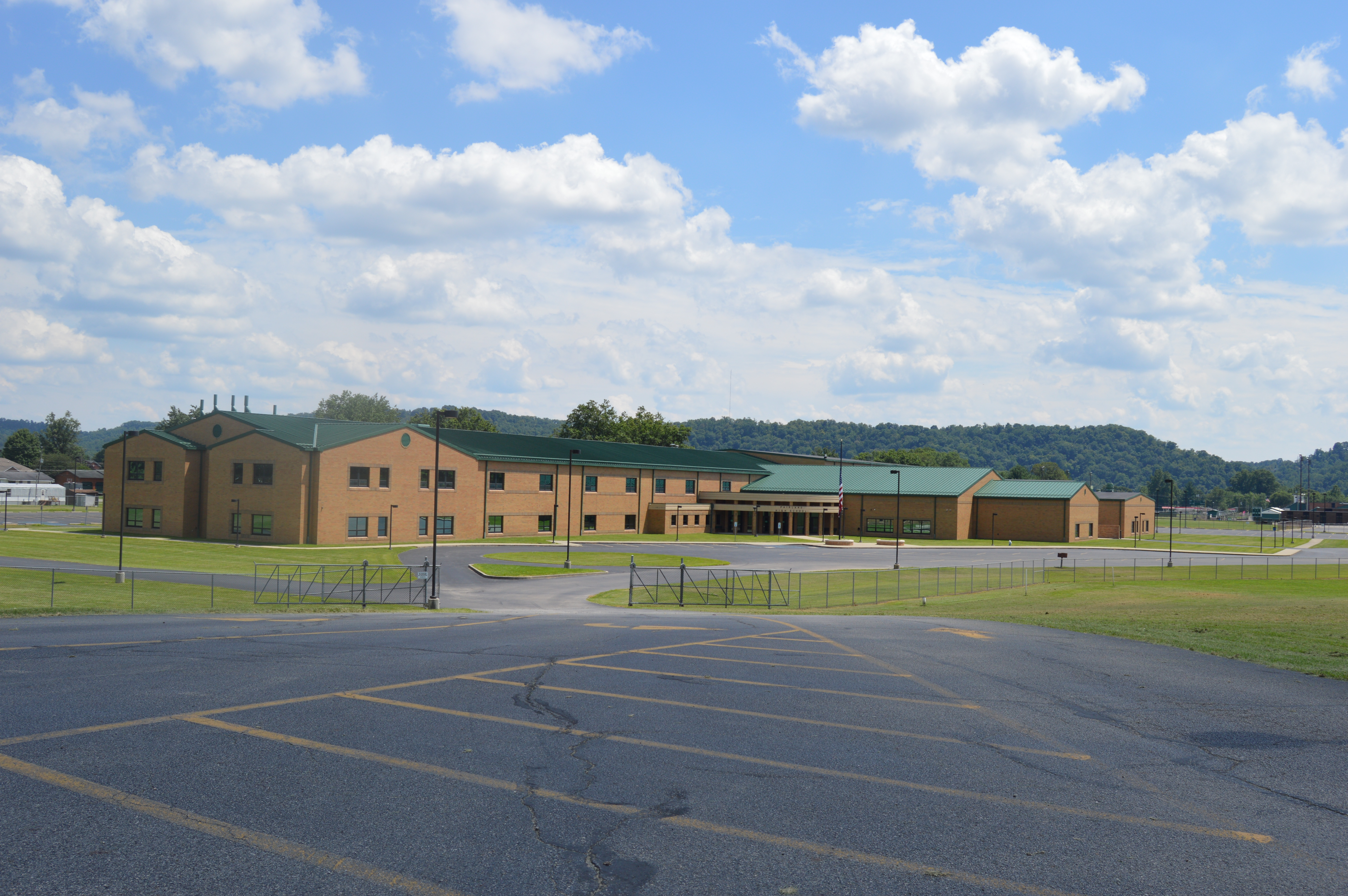
- Fairland High School

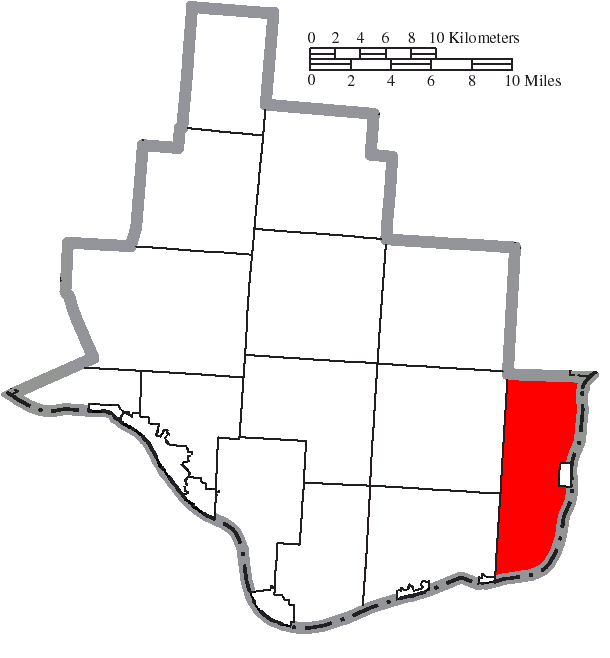
- Location of Rome Township in Lawrence County
- Coordinates: 38°29′9″N 82°20′11″W
- Country: United States
- State: Ohio
- County: Lawrence

Area
  - Total: 34.0 sq mi (88.1 km^{2})
  - Land: 33.7 sq mi (87.2 km^{2})
  - Water: 0.35 sq mi (0.9 km^{2})
- Elevation: 784 ft (239 m)

Population (2020)
  - Total: 8,779
  - Density: 261/sq mi (101/km^{2})
- Time zone: UTC-5 (Eastern (EST))
  - Summer (DST): UTC-4 (EDT)
- FIPS code: 39-68280
- GNIS feature ID: 1086446

Rome Township is one of the fourteen townships of Lawrence County, Ohio, United States. As of the 2020 census, the population was 8,779.

== Geography ==
Located in the southeastern corner of the county along the Ohio River, it borders the following townships:

- Guyan Township, Gallia County - north
- Union Township - southwest
- Windsor Township - west
- Mason Township - northwest corner

Cabell County, West Virginia, lies across the Ohio River to the east and south.

It is the farthest upstream of Lawrence County's Ohio River townships.

Athalia, the second-smallest village in Lawrence County, is located midway along Rome Township's shoreline. Miller, an unincorporated community and census-designated place, is directly north of Athalia.

== Name and history ==
Statewide, other Rome Townships are located in Ashtabula and Athens counties. It was named Rome because of the seven hills that converge at LaBelle as the hills of Rome on the Tiber. The original Rome Beauty apple tree was grafted in Rome Township.

== Government ==
The township is governed by a three-member board of trustees, who are elected in November of odd-numbered years to a four-year term beginning on the following January 1. Two are elected in the year after the presidential election and one is elected in the year before it. There is also an elected township fiscal officer, who serves a four-year term beginning on April 1 of the year after the election, which is held in November of the year before the presidential election. Vacancies in the fiscal officership or on the board of trustees are filled by the remaining trustees.

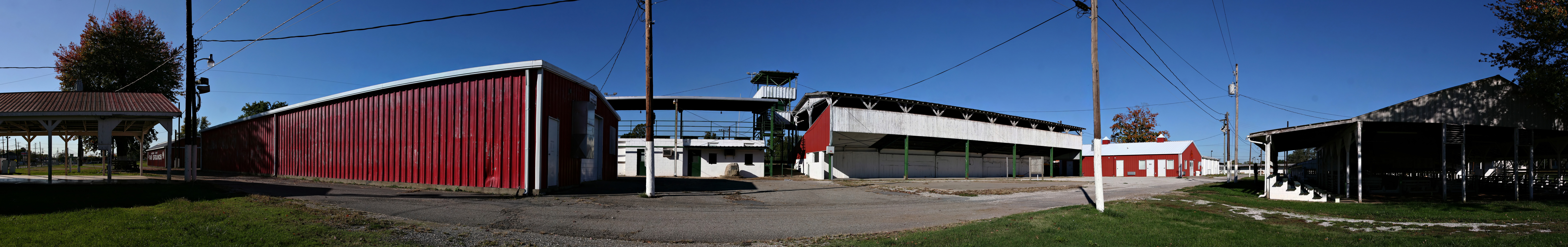
The Lawrence County Fair is held in Rome Township near Proctorville, Ohio
