= Pedro, Ohio =

Unincorporated community in Ohio, U.S.

Coordinates: 38°37′49″N 82°40′03″W

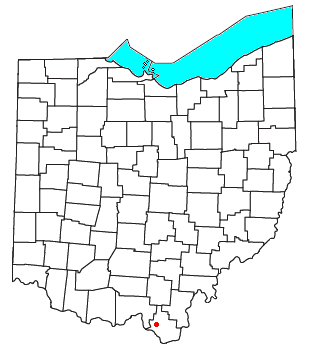
Location of Pedro, Ohio

Pedro is an unincorporated community in central Elizabeth Township, Lawrence County, Ohio, United States. It has a post office with ZIP code 45659.

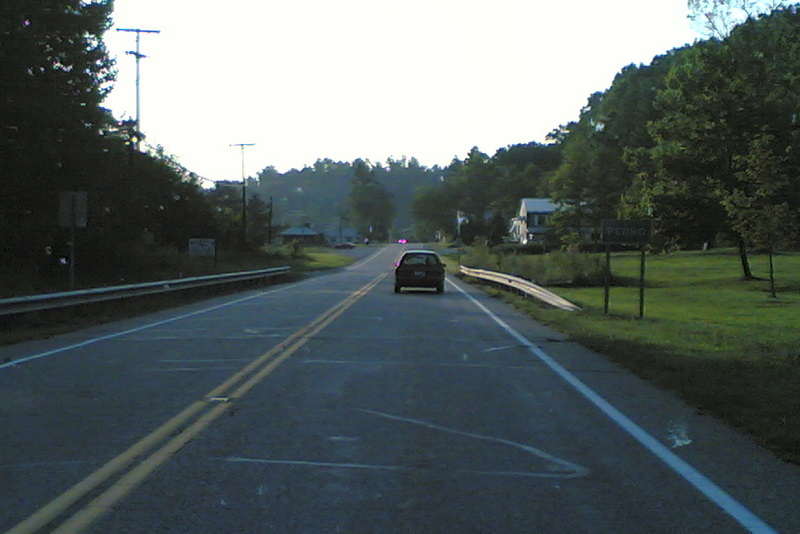
A view of Pedro while traveling north on Ohio State Route 93

== Public services ==
The residents of Pedro are served by the Rock Hill Local School District and the Briggs Lawrence County Public Library in Ironton, with branches in South Point, Chesapeake, Proctorville, and Willow Wood. There is also a pay lake on the left side of State Route 93.
