= Eifort, Ohio =

Unincorporated community in Ohio, U.S.

Coordinates: 38°50′00″N 82°39′11″W

Eifort is an unincorporated community that is located in Lawrence and Scioto counties, Ohio, United States.

== History ==
Eifort had its start in the early 1880s when the railroad was extended to that point. The community takes its name from the local Eifort family. A post office called Eifort was established in 1883 and remained in operation until 1952.
