= Hamilton Township, Lawrence County, Ohio =

Township in Ohio, US

- Township
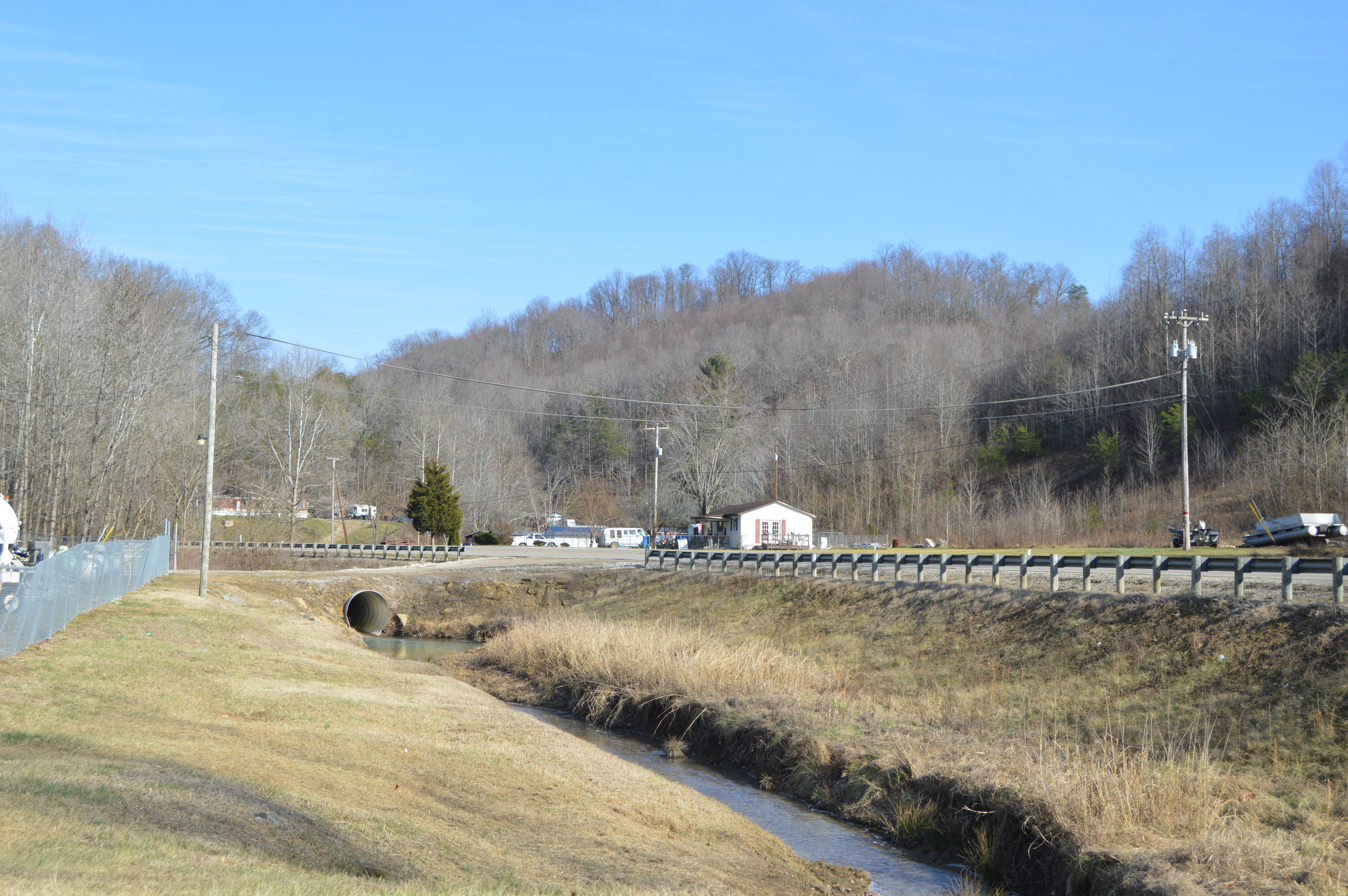
- East of Hanging Rock along State Route 650

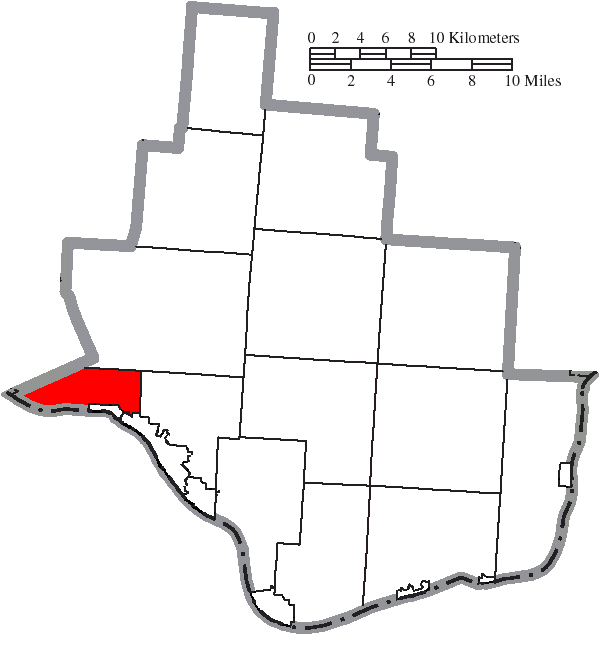
- Location of Hamilton Township in Lawrence County
- Coordinates: 38°33′42″N 82°43′38″W
- Country: United States
- State: Ohio
- County: Lawrence

Area
  - Total: 11.56 sq mi (29.93 km^{2})
  - Land: 11.03 sq mi (28.57 km^{2})
  - Water: 0.53 sq mi (1.36 km^{2})
- Elevation: 597 ft (182 m)

Population (2020)
  - Total: 1,648
  - Density: 149.4/sq mi (57.68/km^{2})
- Time zone: UTC-5 (Eastern (EST))
  - Summer (DST): UTC-4 (EDT)
- FIPS code: 39-33054
- GNIS feature ID: 1086442
- Website: https://www.lawcoht.org/

Hamilton Township is one of the fourteen townships of Lawrence County, Ohio, United States. As of the 2020 census the population was 1,648.

== Geography ==
Located in the western corner of the county along the Ohio River, it borders the following townships:

- Elizabeth Township - north
- Upper Township - east
- Green Township, Scioto County - west

Greenup County, Kentucky, lies across the Ohio River to the south.

It is the farthest downstream of Lawrence County's Ohio River townships.

Two municipalities are located on Hamilton Township's shoreline: Hanging Rock, the smallest village in the county, in the middle; and part of Ironton, the county seat and only city of Lawrence County, in the southeast.

== Government ==
The township is governed by a three-member board of trustees, who are elected in November of odd-numbered years to a four-year term beginning on the following January 1. Two are elected in the year after the presidential election and one is elected in the year before it. There is also an elected township fiscal officer, who serves a four-year term beginning on April 1 of the year after the election, which is held in November of the year before the presidential election. Vacancies in the fiscal officership or on the board of trustees are filled by the remaining trustees.

== Education ==
The vast majority of the township receives Pre-K through 12th grade education from the Rock Hill Local School District. Small portions of the township receive these services from the Green Local School District, or from Ironton City Schools.
