= Kitts Hill, Ohio =

Unincorporated community in Ohio, U.S.

Coordinates: 38°33′41″N 82°34′39″W

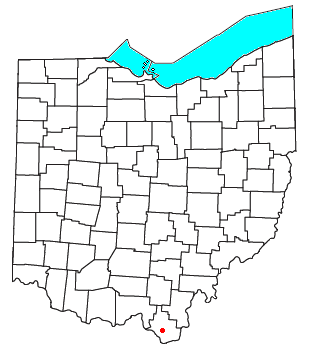
Location of Kitts Hill, Ohio

Kitts Hill is an unincorporated community in western Lawrence Township, Lawrence County, Ohio, United States. It has a post office with the ZIP code 45645. It lies along State Route 141 northeast of the city of Ironton, the county seat of Lawrence County. It has a community center that was previously Deering Local School District in the area. The majority of Pre-K through 12th grade education is provided by the Rock Hill Local School District, although very small portions of the area are served by the Dawson-Bryant Local School District.

Kitts Hill is named for the family of farmer George Edward "Charles" Kitts, who was born in Belmont, and died at Kitts Hill around 1876. His son, Edward Franklin Kitts and wife Mary Ann Farson Kitts, followed. Their daughter Louisa Esther married Willis Crowe, whose family controlled the farm for much of the 20th century.
