= Mason Township, Lawrence County, Ohio =

Township in Ohio, US

- Township
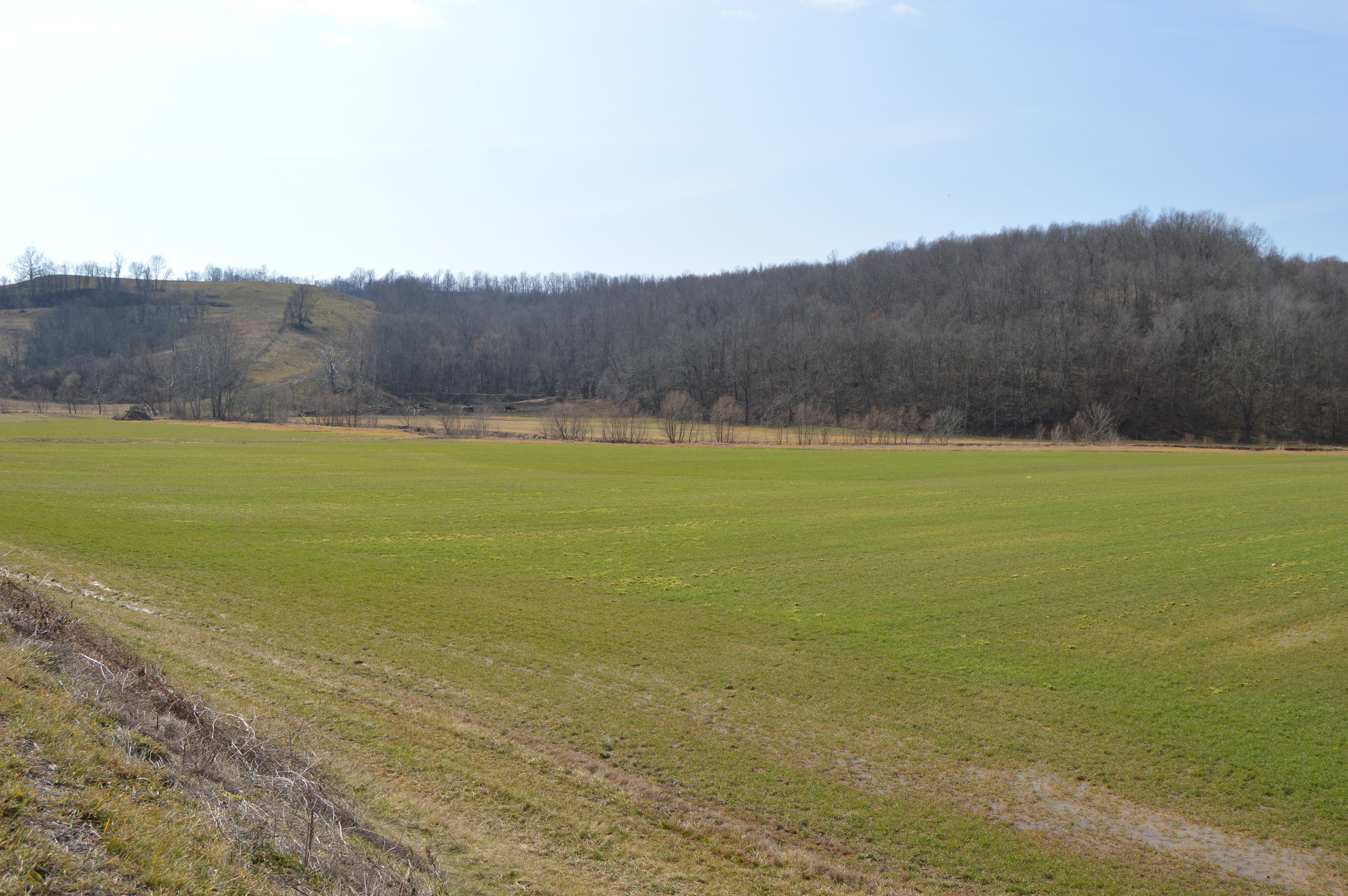
- Winter wheat fields south of Arabia

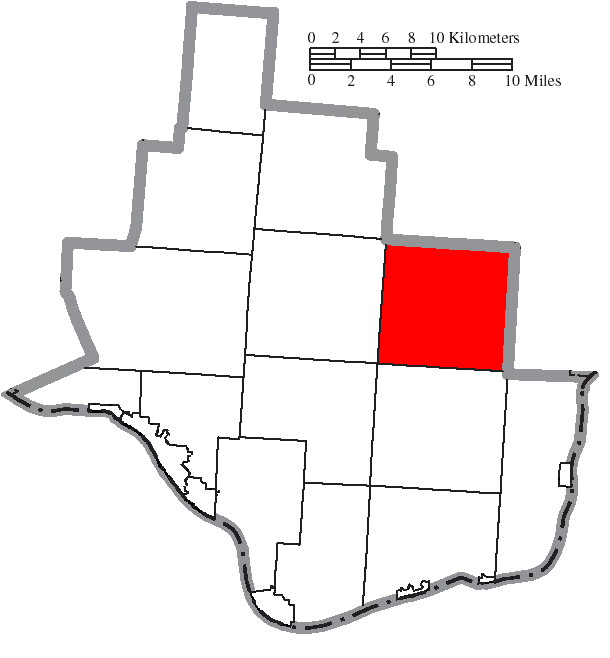
- Location of Mason Township in Lawrence County
- Coordinates: 38°37′16″N 82°25′22″W
- Country: United States
- State: Ohio
- County: Lawrence

Area
  - Total: 39.64 sq mi (102.68 km^{2})
  - Land: 39.40 sq mi (102.04 km^{2})
  - Water: 0.25 sq mi (0.64 km^{2})
- Elevation: 935 ft (285 m)

Population (2020)
  - Total: 974
  - Density: 24.7/sq mi (9.55/km^{2})
- Time zone: UTC-5 (Eastern (EST))
  - Summer (DST): UTC-4 (EDT)
- FIPS code: 39-48174
- GNIS feature ID: 1086444

Mason Township is one of the fourteen townships of Lawrence County, Ohio, United States. As of the 2020 census, the population was 974.

== Geography ==
Located in the northeastern part of the county, it borders the following townships:

- Walnut Township, Gallia County - north
- Harrison Township, Gallia County - northeast corner
- Guyan Township, Gallia County - east
- Rome Township - southeast corner
- Windsor Township - south
- Lawrence Township - southwest corner
- Aid Township - west
- Symmes Township - northwest corner

No municipalities are located in Mason Township. Established before 1873, Arabia is a populated place in the township. Yarico is also a populated place in the township.

== Name and history ==
It is the only Mason Township statewide.

== Government ==
The township is governed by a three-member board of trustees, who are elected in November of odd-numbered years to a four-year term beginning on the following January 1. Two are elected in the year after the presidential election and one is elected in the year before it. There is also an elected township fiscal officer, who serves a four-year term beginning on April 1 of the year after the election, which is held in November of the year before the presidential election. Vacancies in the fiscal officership or on the board of trustees are filled by the remaining trustees.
