= Scottown, Ohio =

Unincorporated community in Ohio, U.S.

Coordinates: 38°33′01″N 82°23′20″W

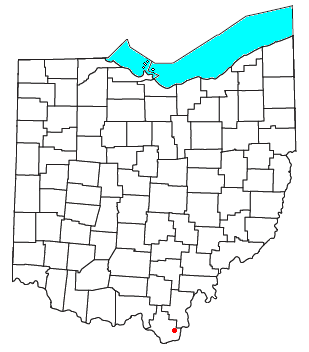
Location of Scottown, Ohio

Scottown is an unincorporated community in eastern Windsor Township, Lawrence County, Ohio, United States. It has a post office with the ZIP code 45678.
