= Lawrence County Courthouse (Ohio) =

Local government building in the United States

Coordinates: 38°32′09″N 82°41′01″W

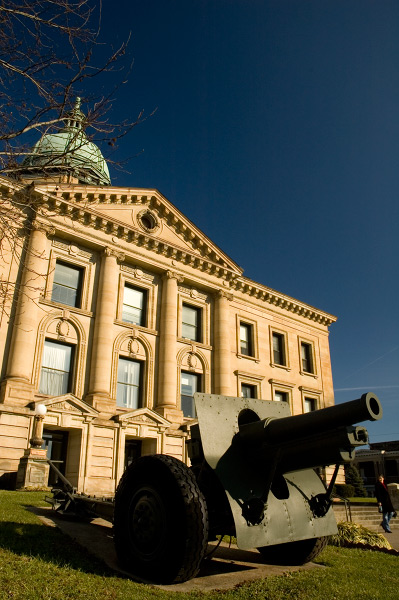
Front of the courthouse

The Lawrence County Courthouse is a historic governmental building in Ironton, Ohio, United States. It was designed by Richards, McCarty & Bulford and built in 1907 after the previous courthouse burned. Built in the Neoclassical style with a domed roof, it was expanded in 1978 by the addition of a rear annex.

Lawrence County was formed on December 20, 1816 from parts of Gallia County and Scioto County with its county seat at Burlington.
