= Decatur Township, Lawrence County, Ohio =

Township in Ohio, US

- Township
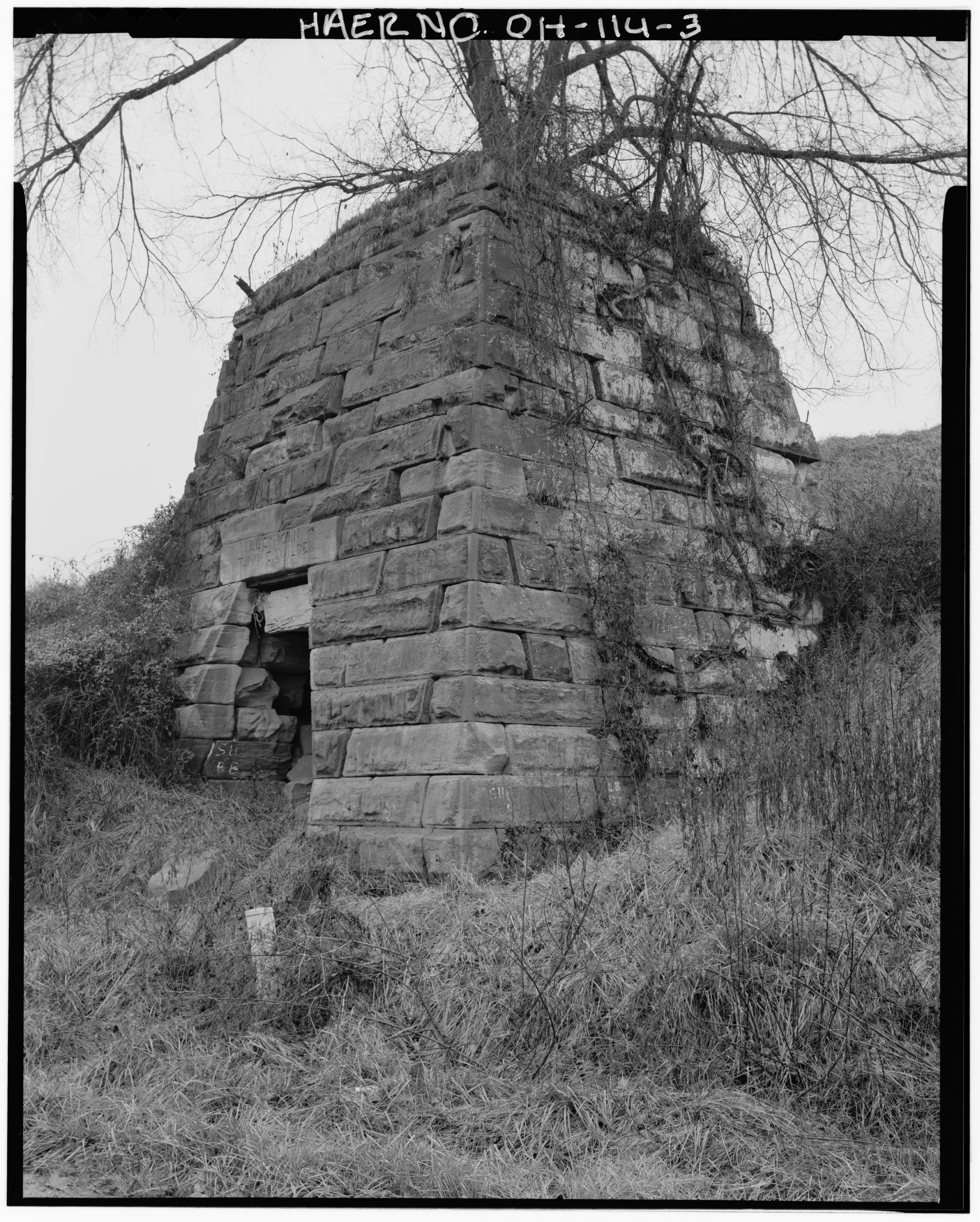
- Buckhorn Iron Furnace near Pedro

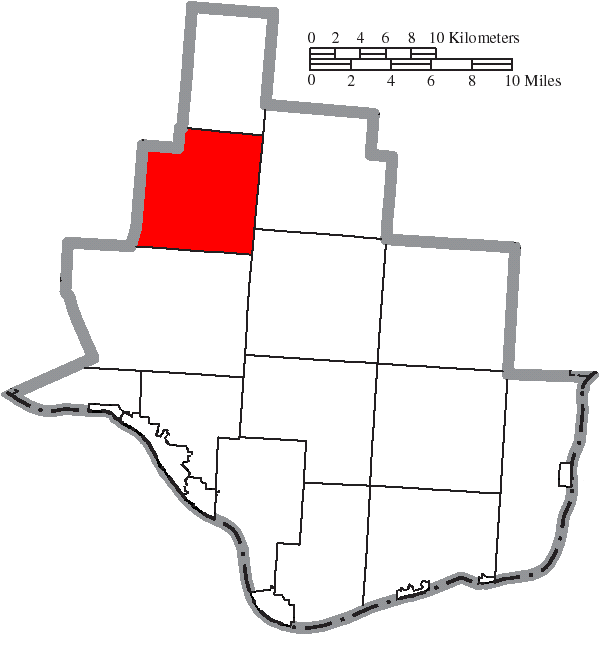
- Location of Decatur Township in Lawrence County
- Coordinates: 38°43′2″N 82°38′50″W
- Country: United States
- State: Ohio
- County: Lawrence

Area
  - Total: 33.4 sq mi (86.6 km^{2})
  - Land: 33.3 sq mi (86.3 km^{2})
  - Water: 0.12 sq mi (0.3 km^{2})
- Elevation: 702 ft (214 m)

Population (2020)
  - Total: 625
  - Density: 18.8/sq mi (7.24/km^{2})
- Time zone: UTC-5 (Eastern (EST))
  - Summer (DST): UTC-4 (EDT)
- FIPS code: 39-21084
- GNIS feature ID: 1086439

Decatur Township is one of the fourteen townships of Lawrence County, Ohio, United States. The population was 625 at the 2020 census.

== Geography ==
Located in the northwestern part of the county, it borders the following townships:

- Washington Township - north
- Symmes Township - east
- Aid Township - southeast
- Elizabeth Township - south
- Vernon Township, Scioto County - west
- Bloom Township, Scioto County - northwest

No municipalities are located in Decatur Township.

== Name and history ==
Statewide, the only other Decatur Township is located in Washington County.

== Government ==
The township is governed by a three-member board of trustees, who are elected in November of odd-numbered years to a four-year term beginning on the following January 1. Two are elected in the year after the presidential election and one is elected in the year before it. There is also an elected township fiscal officer, who serves a four-year term beginning on April 1 of the year after the election, which is held in November of the year before the presidential election. Vacancies in the fiscal officership or on the board of trustees are filled by the remaining trustees.

== Education ==
All of Decatur Township's educational services are provided by the Rock Hill Local School District, which provides Pre-K through 12th grades.
