= Andis, Ohio =

- Unincorporated community
- Location within Ohio Location within the United States
- Coordinates: 38.5509138°N 82.5232132°W
- Country: United States
- State: Ohio
- County: Lawrence
- Township: Lawrence
- Elevation: 673 ft (205 m)
- Time zone: UTC−5 (Eastern (EST))
  - Summer (DST): UTC−4 (EDT)
- GNIS feature ID: 1075263

Andis is an unincorporated community in Lawrence County, Ohio, United States.

== History ==
A post office was established in Andis on May 7, 1886, and remained in operation until June 15, 1921.

Andis Elementary School was constructed in 1940. The school was closed in 1992 by the Dawson-Bryant Local School District.
