= Aid Township, Ohio =

Township in Ohio, US

Aid Township, Lawrence County, Ohio
- Township
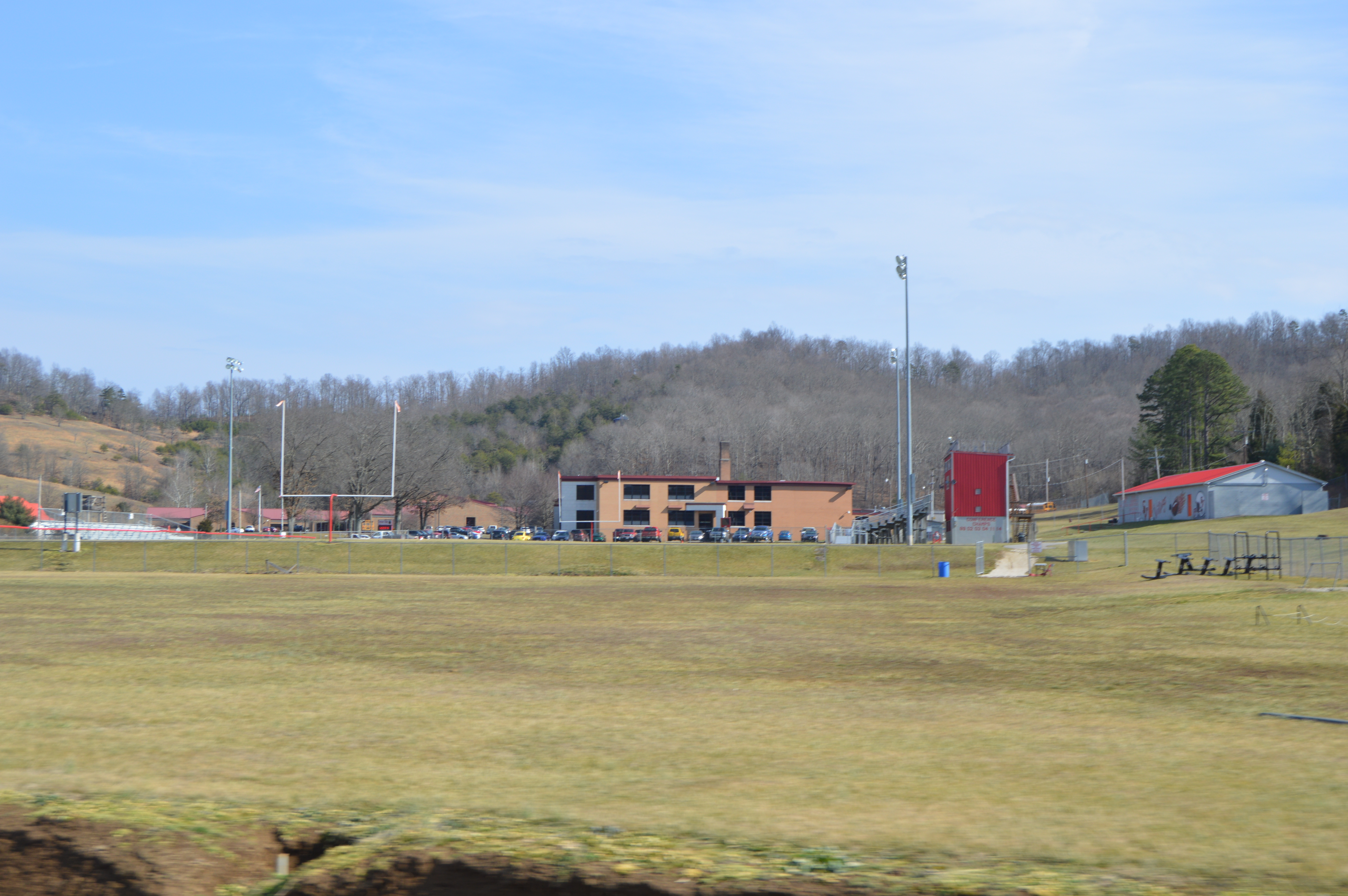
- Symmes Valley High School

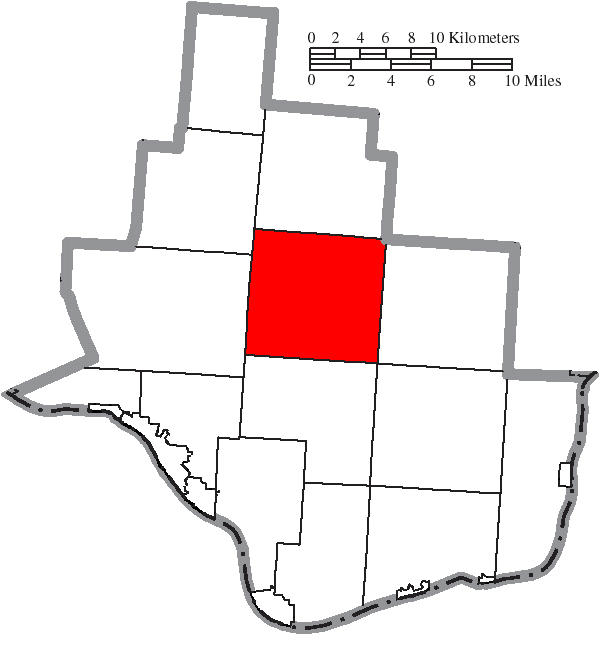
- Location of Aid Township in Lawrence County
- Coordinates: 38°39′7″N 82°32′13″W
- Country: United States
- State: Ohio
- County: Lawrence

Area
  - Total: 40.9 sq mi (106.0 km^{2})
  - Land: 40.7 sq mi (105.5 km^{2})
  - Water: 0.19 sq mi (0.5 km^{2})
- Elevation: 692 ft (211 m)

Population (2020)
  - Total: 819
  - Density: 20.1/sq mi (7.76/km^{2})
- Time zone: UTC-5 (Eastern (EST))
  - Summer (DST): UTC-4 (EDT)
- FIPS code: 39-087-00562
- GNIS feature ID: 1086438

Aid Township is one of the fourteen townships of Lawrence County, Ohio, United States. The township had a population of 819 at the 2020 census.

== Geography ==
Located in the northern part of the county, it borders the following townships:

- Symmes Township - north
- Walnut Township, Gallia County - northeast corner
- Mason Township - east
- Windsor Township - southeast corner
- Lawrence Township - south
- Elizabeth Township - west
- Decatur Township - northwest

No municipalities are located in Aid Township.

== Name and history ==
It is the only Aid Township statewide.

== Government ==
The township is governed by a three-member board of trustees, who are elected in November of odd-numbered years to a four-year term beginning on the following January 1. Two are elected in the year after the presidential election and one is elected in the year before it. There is also an elected township fiscal officer, who serves a four-year term beginning on April 1 of the year after the election, which is held in November of the year before the presidential election. Vacancies in the fiscal officership or on the board of trustees are filled by the remaining trustees.

== Education ==
The majority of Aid Township's educational services are provided by the Symmes Valley Local School District (K-12), although portions of the township are educationally served by the Rock Hill Local School District (Pre-K-12).

== Notable Person ==
- Simeon Slavens Willis, 46th Governor of Kentucky
