= Windsor Township, Lawrence County, Ohio =

Township in Ohio, US

- Township
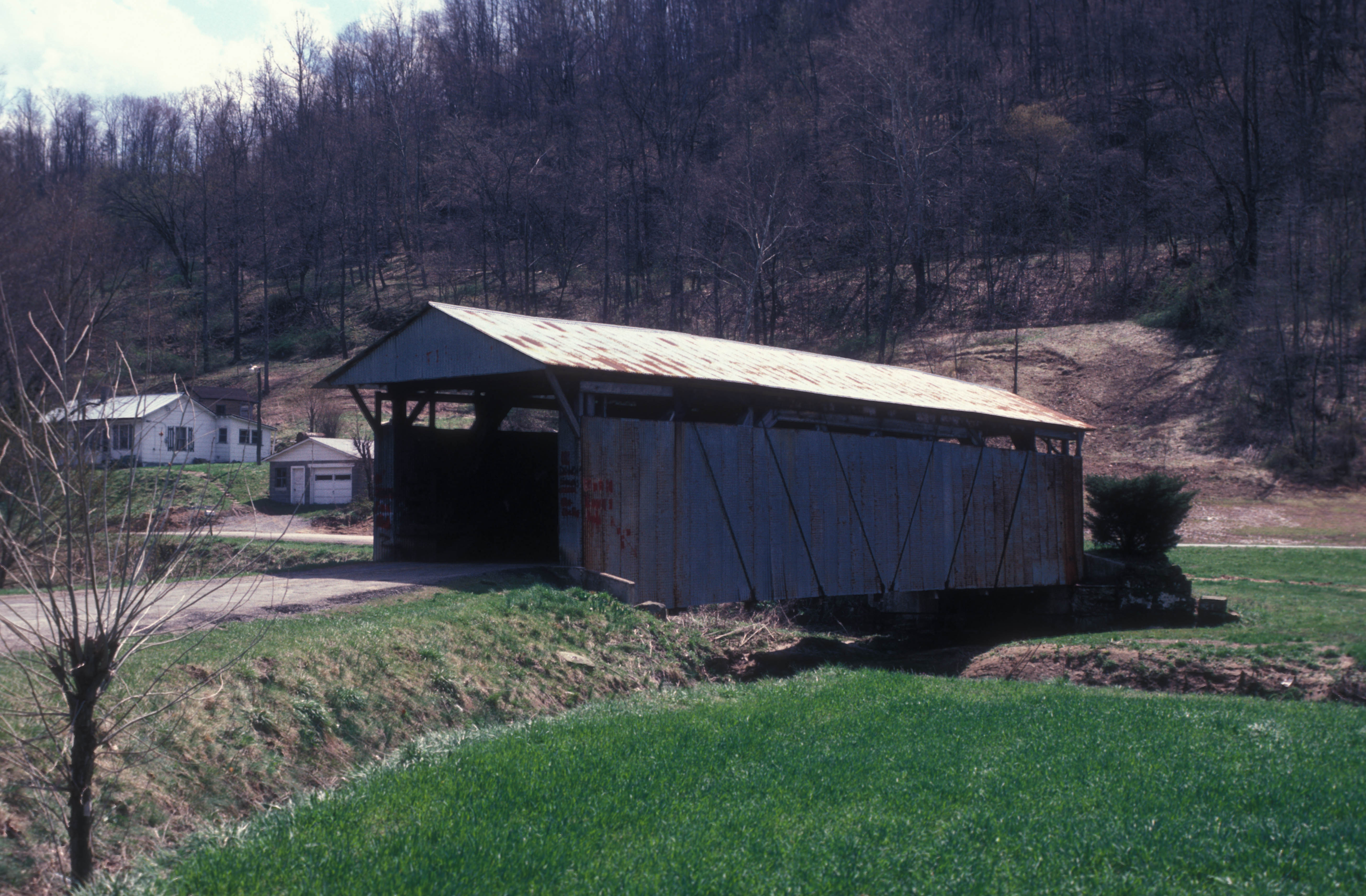
- The Scottown Covered Bridge

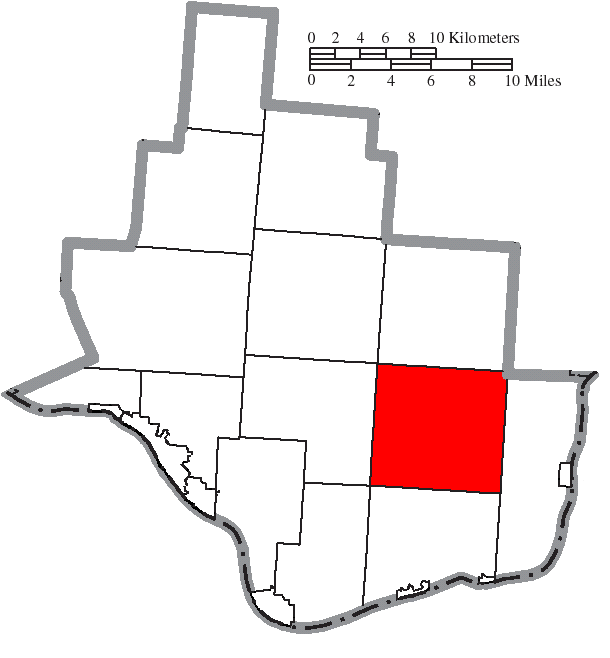
- Location of Windsor Township in Lawrence County
- Coordinates: 38°32′29″N 82°25′38″W
- Country: United States
- State: Ohio
- County: Lawrence

Area
  - Total: 39.2 sq mi (101.4 km^{2})
  - Land: 39.0 sq mi (100.9 km^{2})
  - Water: 0.19 sq mi (0.5 km^{2})
- Elevation: 850 ft (259 m)

Population (2020)
  - Total: 2,022
  - Density: 51.90/sq mi (20.04/km^{2})
- Time zone: UTC-5 (Eastern (EST))
  - Summer (DST): UTC-4 (EDT)
- FIPS code: 39-86002
- GNIS feature ID: 1086451

Windsor Township is one of the fourteen townships of Lawrence County, Ohio, United States. As of the 2020 census, the population was 2,022.

== Geography ==
Located in the southeastern part of the county, it borders the following townships:

- Mason Township - north
- Guyan Township, Gallia County - northeast corner
- Rome Township - east
- Union Township - south
- Fayette Township - southwest corner
- Lawrence Township - west
- Aid Township - northwest corner

No municipalities are located in Windsor Township, although the unincorporated communities of Scottown and Willow Wood are located in the eastern and central parts of the township respectively.

== Name and history ==
Statewide, other Windsor Townships are located in Ashtabula and Morgan counties.

== Government ==
The township is governed by a three-member board of trustees, who are elected in November of odd-numbered years to a four-year term beginning on the following January 1. Two are elected in the year after the presidential election and one is elected in the year before it. There is also an elected township fiscal officer, who serves a four-year term beginning on April 1 of the year after the election, which is held in November of the year before the presidential election. Vacancies in the fiscal officership or on the board of trustees are filled by the remaining trustees.
