= Upper Township, Lawrence County, Ohio =

Township in Ohio, US

- Township
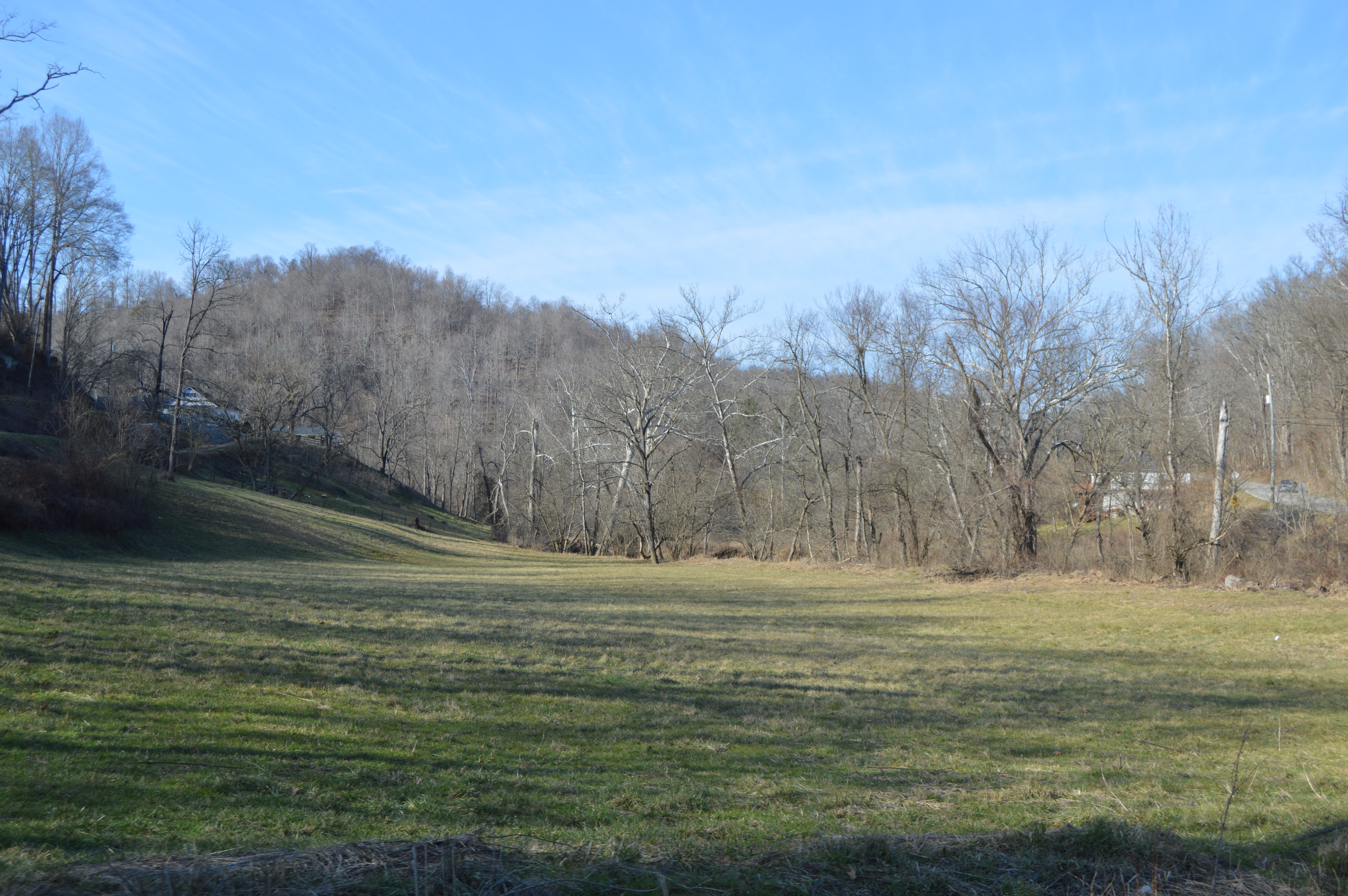
- Scene along Porter Gap Road by Storms Creek

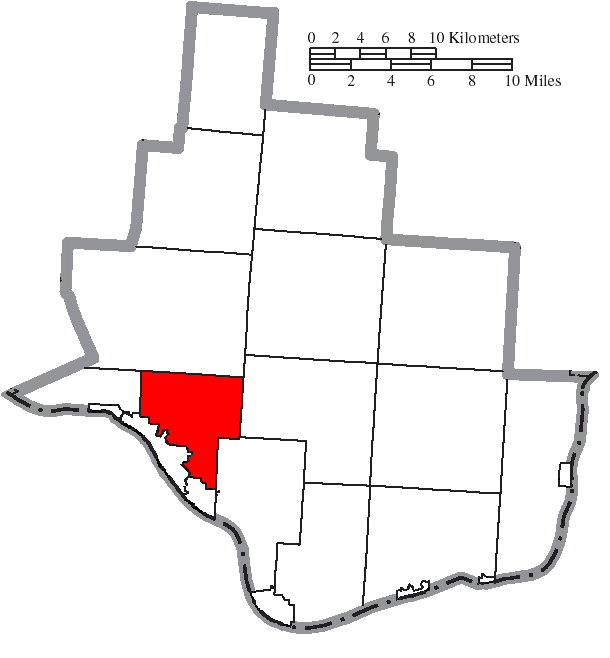
- Location of Upper Township in Lawrence County
- Coordinates: 38°31′42″N 82°40′9″W
- Country: United States
- State: Ohio
- County: Lawrence

Area
  - Total: 24.8 sq mi (64.3 km^{2})
  - Land: 24.3 sq mi (63.0 km^{2})
  - Water: 0.50 sq mi (1.3 km^{2})
- Elevation: 590 ft (180 m)

Population (2020)
  - Total: 14,451
  - Density: 594/sq mi (229/km^{2})
- Time zone: UTC-5 (Eastern (EST))
  - Summer (DST): UTC-4 (EDT)
- FIPS code: 39-78974
- GNIS feature ID: 1086449

Upper Township is one of the fourteen townships of Lawrence County, Ohio, United States. As of the 2020 census the population was 14,451.

== Geography ==
Located in the southwestern part of the county along the Ohio River, it borders the following townships:

- Elizabeth Township - north
- Lawrence Township - east
- Perry Township - southeast
- Hamilton Township - west

Kentucky lies across the Ohio River to the southwest: Boyd County to the south, and Greenup County otherwise.

It is located downstream of most of the rest of Lawrence County's Ohio River townships.

Most of Upper Township's shoreline is occupied by the city of Ironton, the county seat of Lawrence County and by far the largest municipality in the county. The village of Coal Grove, the third-largest municipality in the county, is located upstream (southeast) of Ironton.

== Name and history ==
It is the only Upper Township statewide.

== Government ==
The township is governed by a three-member board of trustees, who are elected in November of odd-numbered years to a four-year term beginning on the following January 1. Two are elected in the year after the presidential election and one is elected in the year before it. There is also an elected township fiscal officer, who serves a four-year term beginning on April 1 of the year after the election, which is held in November of the year before the presidential election. Vacancies in the fiscal officership or on the board of trustees are filled by the remaining trustees.

The current trustees are: Craig Thomas, Tony Sites, and Randy Wise

The current fiscal officer is: Tyler Walters

== Education ==
Upper Township's Pre-K through 12th grade educational services are provided mostly by the Rock Hill Local School District. Portions of the township are also served by the Dawson-Bryant Local School District. The Ironton city area, which lies within Upper Township, is served by Ironton City Schools.
