= Elizabeth Township, Lawrence County, Ohio =

Township in Ohio, US

- Township
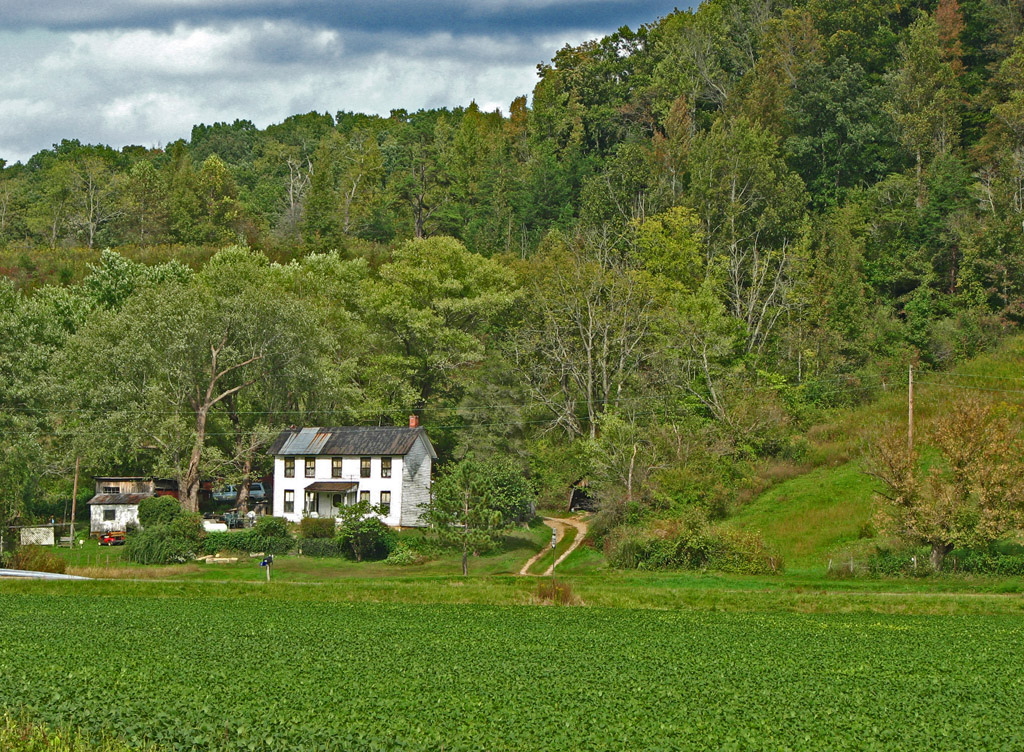
- A farm in the township

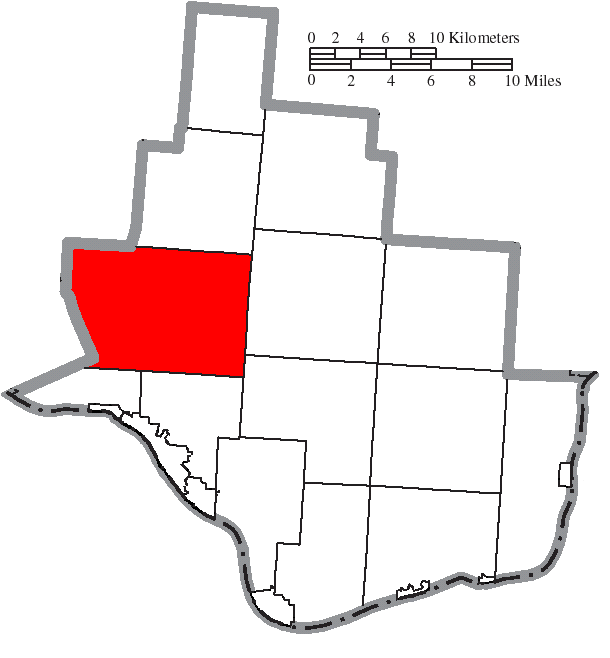
- Location of Elizabeth Township in Lawrence County
- Coordinates: 38°38′12″N 82°40′54″W
- Country: United States
- State: Ohio
- County: Lawrence

Area
  - Total: 52.4 sq mi (135.7 km^{2})
  - Land: 51.9 sq mi (134.3 km^{2})
  - Water: 0.54 sq mi (1.4 km^{2})
- Elevation: 620 ft (189 m)

Population (2020)
  - Total: 2,527
  - Density: 48.73/sq mi (18.82/km^{2})
- Time zone: UTC-5 (Eastern (EST))
  - Summer (DST): UTC-4 (EDT)
- FIPS code: 39-24822
- GNIS feature ID: 1086440

Elizabeth Township is one of the fourteen townships of Lawrence County, Ohio, United States. As of the 2020 census the population was 2,527.

== Geography ==
Located in the western part of the county, it borders the following townships:

- Decatur Township - north
- Aid Township - east
- Lawrence Township - southeast
- Upper Township - south
- Hamilton Township - southwest
- Green Township, Scioto County - west
- Vernon Township, Scioto County - northwest

No municipalities are located in Elizabeth Township, although the unincorporated communities of Etna and Pedro lie in the eastern part of the township.

== Name and history ==
Statewide, the only other Elizabeth Township is located in Miami County.

== Government ==
The township is governed by a three-member board of trustees, who are elected in November of odd-numbered years to a four-year term beginning on the following January 1. Two are elected in the year after the presidential election and one is elected in the year before it. There is also an elected township fiscal officer, who serves a four-year term beginning on April 1 of the year after the election, which is held in November of the year before the presidential election. Vacancies in the fiscal officership or on the board of trustees are filled by the remaining trustees.

== Notable people ==
George Washington Rightmire - 6th President of The Ohio State University
