= Lawrence County, Ohio =

County in Ohio, United States

- County
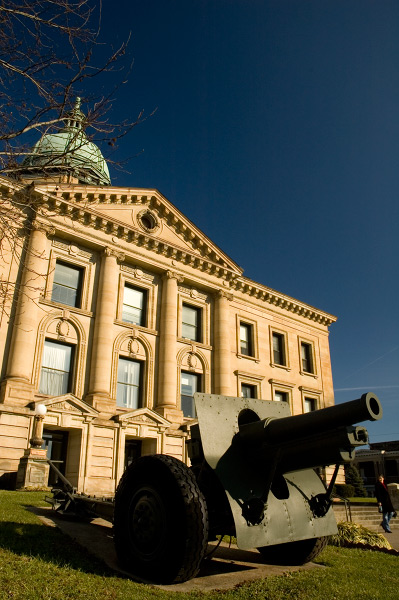
- Lawrence County Courthouse

- Flag Seal

- Location within the U.S. state of Ohio
- Coordinates: 38°35′N 82°32′W
- Country: United States
- State: Ohio
- Founded: March 1, 1817
- Named for: James Lawrence
- Seat: Ironton
- Largest city: Ironton

Area
  - Total: 457 sq mi (1,180 km^{2})
  - Land: 453 sq mi (1,170 km^{2})
  - Water: 3.9 sq mi (10 km^{2}) 0.9%

Population (2020)
  - Total: 58,240
  - Estimate (2025): 55,710 ▼
  - Density: 130/sq mi (50/km^{2})
- Time zone: UTC−5 (Eastern)
  - Summer (DST): UTC−4 (EDT)
- Congressional district: 2nd
- Website: lawrencecounty.org

Lawrence County is the southernmost county of the U.S. state of Ohio. As of the 2020 census, the population was 58,240. Its county seat is Ironton. The county was created in 1815 and later organized in 1817. It is named for James Lawrence, the naval officer famous for the line "do not give up the ship". Lawrence County is part of the Huntington–Ashland metropolitan area.

== History ==
The earliest European-American settlers, Luke Kelly and his family, and May Keyser, settled at Hanging Rock along the Ohio River in 1796, having migrated from the east. Lawrence County was formed on December 20, 1816, from parts of Gallia and Scioto counties, with the county seat named as Burlington. In 1851, the county seat was moved from Burlington to Ironton. A new courthouse was built at that time. It burned in 1857. The present Lawrence County Courthouse was built in 1908.

Men from Lawrence County served in the Mexican–American War, with at least one having died during that conflict. By 1862, about 3,200 of Lawrence County's men were soldiers in the Union Army in the American Civil War. During World War I, 2,200 of Lawrence County's men served in the armed forces, and 99 died.

== Geography ==
According to the U.S. Census Bureau, the county has a total area of 457 square miles (1,180 km^{2}), of which 453 square miles (1,170 km^{2}) is land and 3.9 square miles (10 km^{2}) (0.9%) is water. It is the southernmost county in the state of Ohio and part of Appalachian Ohio.

=== Adjacent counties ===
- Jackson County (north)
- Gallia County (northeast)
- Cabell County, West Virginia (southeast)
- Wayne County, West Virginia (south)
- Boyd County, Kentucky (southwest)
- Greenup County, Kentucky (southwest)
- Scioto County (northwest)

=== National protected area ===
- Wayne National Forest (part)

== Demographics ==
Historical population
Census	Pop.	Note	%±
1820	3,499		—
1830	5,367		53.4%
1840	9,738		81.4%
1850	15,246		56.6%
1860	23,249		52.5%
1870	31,380		35.0%
1880	39,068		24.5%
1890	39,556		1.2%
1900	39,534		−0.1%
1910	39,488		−0.1%
1920	39,540		0.1%
1930	44,541		12.6%
1940	46,705		4.9%
1950	49,115		5.2%
1960	55,438		12.9%
1970	56,868		2.6%
1980	63,849		12.3%
1990	61,834		−3.2%
2000	62,319		0.8%
2010	62,450		0.2%
2020	58,240		−6.7%
2025 (est.)	55,710	▼	−4.3%
U.S. Decennial Census; 1790–1960 1900–1990; 1990–2000 2020

=== 2020 census ===
As of the 2020 census, the county had a population of 58,240. The median age was 43.1 years. 21.7% of residents were under the age of 18 and 20.0% of residents were 65 years of age or older. For every 100 females there were 94.9 males, and for every 100 females age 18 and over there were 91.7 males age 18 and over.

The racial makeup of the county was 93.2% White, 1.9% Black or African American, 0.2% American Indian and Alaska Native, 0.4% Asian, <0.1% Native Hawaiian and Pacific Islander, 0.4% from some other race, and 3.8% from two or more races. Hispanic or Latino residents of any race comprised 1.1% of the population.

54.7% of residents lived in urban areas, while 45.3% lived in rural areas.

There were 23,872 households in the county, of which 29.0% had children under the age of 18 living in them. Of all households, 46.6% were married-couple households, 17.9% were households with a male householder and no spouse or partner present, and 28.4% were households with a female householder and no spouse or partner present. About 28.3% of all households were made up of individuals and 13.6% had someone living alone who was 65 years of age or older.

There were 26,501 housing units, of which 9.9% were vacant. Among occupied housing units, 71.4% were owner-occupied and 28.6% were renter-occupied. The homeowner vacancy rate was 1.9% and the rental vacancy rate was 5.9%.

=== Racial and ethnic composition ===
Lawrence County, Ohio – racial and ethnic composition Note: the US Census treats Hispanic/Latino as an ethnic category. This table excludes Latinos from the racial categories and assigns them to a separate category. Hispanics/Latinos may be of any race.
Race / ethnicity (NH = Non-Hispanic)	Pop 1980	Pop 1990	Pop 2000	Pop 2010	Pop 2020	% 1980	% 1990	% 2000	% 2010	% 2020
White alone (NH)	61,770	60,003	59,915	59,547	54,016	96.74%	97.04%	96.14%	95.35%	92.75%
Black or African American alone (NH)	1,536	1,555	1,297	1,267	1,100	2.41%	2.51%	2.08%	2.03%	1.89%
Native American or Alaska Native alone (NH)	105	57	105	111	134	0.16%	0.09%	0.17%	0.18%	0.23%
Asian alone (NH)	75	70	117	240	219	0.12%	0.11%	0.19%	0.38%	0.38%
Native Hawaiian or Pacific Islander alone (NH)	x	x	3	3	7	x	x	0.00%	0.00%	0.01%
Other race alone (NH)	51	10	22	50	135	0.08%	0.02%	0.04%	0.08%	0.23%
Mixed-race or multiracial (NH)	x	x	505	787	2,011	x	x	0.81%	1.26%	3.45%
Hispanic or Latino (any race)	312	139	355	445	618	0.49%	0.22%	0.57%	0.71%	1.06%
Total	63,849	61,834	62,319	62,450	58,240	100.00%	100.00%	100.00%	100.00%	100.00%

=== 2010 census ===
As of the 2010 United States census, there were 62,450 people, 24,974 households, and 17,405 families living in the county. The population density was 137.7 inhabitants per square mile (53.2/km^{2}). There were 27,603 housing units at an average density of 60.9 per square mile (23.5/km^{2}). The racial makeup of the county was 95.9% white, 2.0% black or African American, 0.4% Asian, 0.2% American Indian, 0.2% from other races, and 1.4% from two or more races. Those of Hispanic or Latino origin made up 0.7% of the population. In terms of ancestry, 18.0% were American, 15.4% were German, 12.9% were Irish, and 10.8% were English. In Lawrence County, less than 1% of people who self-identify as "Irish" are Catholic. Scholars believe this is part of a trend in which people are vaguely aware that at least some of their ancestors come from Ireland, but that population is primarily of "Scots-Irish" or "Ulster Scots" ancestry, and those identifying as "Irish" are simply unaware of the distinction. Those citing "American" ancestry in Lawrence County are of overwhelmingly English extraction, most English Americans identify simply as American because their ancestors have been in North America for centuries—in some cases since the 1600s.

Of the 24,974 households, 32.9% had children under the age of 18 living with them, 51.0% were married couples living together, 13.2% had a female householder with no husband present, 30.3% were non-families, and 26.1% of all households were made up of individuals. The average household size was 2.47 and the average family size was 2.95. The median age was 40.1 years.

The median income for a household in the county was $36,461 and the median income for a family was $46,732. Males had a median income of $38,170 versus $28,251 for females. The per capita income for the county was $19,452. About 15.2% of families and 19.4% of the population were below the poverty line, including 28.0% of those under age 18 and 11.9% of those age 65 or over.

=== 2000 census ===
As of the census of 2000, there were 62,319 people, 24,732 households, and 17,807 families living in the county. The population density was 137 inhabitants per square mile (53/km^{2}). There were 27,189 housing units at an average density of 60 units per square mile (23/km^{2}). The racial makeup of the county was 96.55% White, 2.09% Black or African American, 0.18% Native American, 0.19% Asian, 0.01% Pacific Islander, 0.11% from other races, and 0.88% from two or more races. 0.57% of the population were Hispanic or Latino of any race.

There were 24,732 households, out of which 32.00% had children under the age of 18 living with them, 56.00% were married couples living together, 11.90% had a female householder with no husband present, and 28.00% were non-families. 24.90% of all households were made up of individuals, and 11.20% had someone living alone who was 65 years of age or older. The average household size was 2.49 and the average family size was 2.96.

In the county, the population was spread out, with 24.50% under the age of 18, 8.60% from 18 to 24, 28.00% from 25 to 44, 24.50% from 45 to 64, and 14.40% who were 65 years of age or older. The median age was 38 years. For every 100 females there were 92.20 males. For every 100 females age 18 and over, there were 88.40 males.

The median income for a household in the county was $29,127, and the median income for a family was $35,308. Males had a median income of $30,622 versus $20,961 for females. The per capita income for the county was $14,678. About 15.10% of families and 18.90% of the population were below the poverty line, including 27.30% of those under age 18 and 12.90% of those age 65 or over.

== Politics ==
Lawrence County tends to support the Republican Party in presidential elections. Bill Clinton was the last Democrat to win the county, in 1996 – a distinction shared with 16 other Ohio counties, mostly in this region. Despite this fact, Democrats continued to crack 40% in election years. This changed in 2016, as with much of Appalachia, when Hillary Clinton's 26.03% was the lowest in nearly 90 nears. Four years later, Joe Biden barely did better.

United States presidential election results for Lawrence County, Ohio
Year	Republican		Democratic		Third party(ies)	
Year	No.	%	No.	%	No.	%
1856	743	26.58%	1,150	41.14%	902	32.27%
1860	1,801	55.90%	1,147	35.60%	274	8.50%
1864	2,985	72.68%	1,122	27.32%	0	0.00%
1868	3,159	65.73%	1,647	34.27%	0	0.00%
1872	3,624	68.17%	1,637	30.79%	55	1.03%
1876	3,975	57.15%	2,949	42.40%	31	0.45%
1880	4,627	61.50%	2,862	38.04%	34	0.45%
1884	4,817	60.91%	3,024	38.24%	67	0.85%
1888	4,713	59.54%	3,068	38.76%	135	1.71%
1892	4,193	56.84%	2,988	40.50%	196	2.66%
1896	5,408	63.42%	3,050	35.77%	69	0.81%
1900	5,505	64.97%	2,876	33.94%	92	1.09%
1904	5,587	72.42%	1,905	24.69%	223	2.89%
1908	5,708	66.67%	2,654	31.00%	200	2.34%
1912	2,650	37.39%	2,042	28.81%	2,395	33.79%
1916	4,363	59.10%	2,821	38.21%	198	2.68%
1920	7,616	65.08%	3,955	33.80%	131	1.12%
1924	6,798	63.96%	2,729	25.68%	1,101	10.36%
1928	10,346	74.51%	3,470	24.99%	69	0.50%
1932	8,598	50.83%	8,157	48.22%	160	0.95%
1936	8,498	42.35%	11,471	57.17%	97	0.48%
1940	10,274	49.08%	10,661	50.92%	0	0.00%
1944	9,312	53.90%	7,966	46.10%	0	0.00%
1948	8,113	45.88%	9,495	53.69%	76	0.43%
1952	11,962	56.22%	9,316	43.78%	0	0.00%
1956	12,607	62.72%	7,492	37.28%	0	0.00%
1960	13,159	60.32%	8,656	39.68%	0	0.00%
1964	7,757	38.04%	12,635	61.96%	0	0.00%
1968	9,782	46.75%	8,671	41.44%	2,470	11.81%
1972	15,125	67.02%	7,112	31.52%	330	1.46%
1976	10,668	46.39%	12,072	52.50%	256	1.11%
1980	13,799	52.68%	11,366	43.39%	1,029	3.93%
1984	14,793	55.96%	11,431	43.24%	213	0.81%
1988	12,937	52.23%	11,628	46.95%	203	0.82%
1992	10,044	37.17%	12,325	45.61%	4,652	17.22%
1996	8,832	36.91%	11,595	48.46%	3,499	14.62%
2000	12,531	51.25%	11,307	46.24%	614	2.51%
2004	15,455	55.77%	12,120	43.74%	135	0.49%
2008	15,415	56.28%	11,262	41.12%	713	2.60%
2012	14,651	56.50%	10,744	41.43%	537	2.07%
2016	18,689	69.76%	6,974	26.03%	1,126	4.20%
2020	20,306	72.06%	7,489	26.58%	384	1.36%
2024	20,013	74.58%	6,514	24.27%	309	1.15%

United States Senate election results for Lawrence County, Ohio1
Year	Republican		Democratic		Third party(ies)	
Year	No.	%	No.	%	No.	%
2024	18,077	68.66%	7,192	27.32%	1,060	4.03%

== Government ==
Lawrence County elected officials

- Commissioner: Dr. Colton Copley (R-South Point)
- Commissioner: DeAnna Holliday (R-Ironton)
- Commissioner: Mike Finley (R-Ironton)
- Auditor: Paul David Knipp (R-Ironton)
- Treasurer: Tresa Baker (R-Proctorville)
- Clerk of courts: Mike Patterson (D-Kitts Hill)
- Sheriff: Jeff Lawless (R-Ironton)
- Recorder: Lori Morris (R-Kitts Hill)
- Coroner: Ben Mack (R-Crown City)
- Prosecutor: Brigham Anderson (R-Ironton)
- Engineer: Patrick Leighty (R-South Point)
- Common pleas judge: Andrew Ballard (D-Proctorville)
- Common pleas judge: Christen Finley (R-South Point)
- Juvenile/probate judge: Patricia Sanders (R-South Point)

Primary political parties

- Lawrence County Democratic Party
- Lawrence County Republican Party

== Communities ==
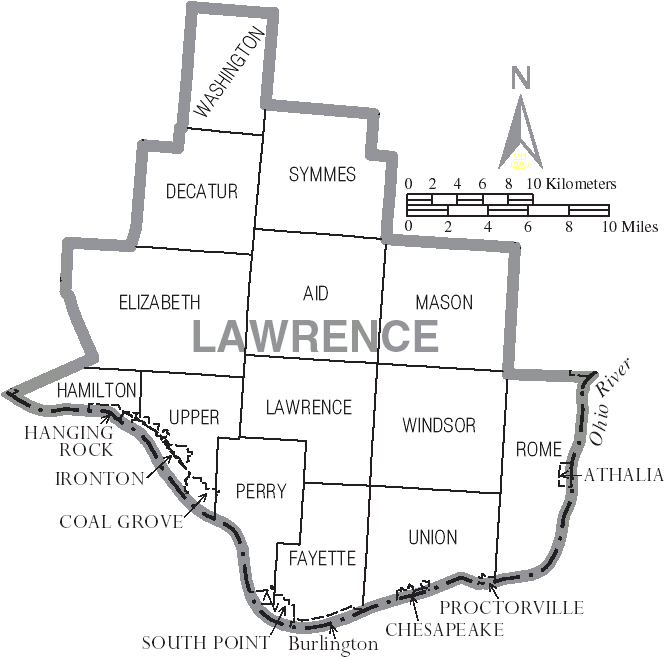
Map of Lawrence County, with municipal and township labels

=== City ===
- Ironton (county seat)

=== Villages ===
- Athalia
- Chesapeake
- Coal Grove
- Hanging Rock
- Proctorville
- South Point

=== Townships ===
- Aid
- Decatur
- Elizabeth
- Fayette
- Hamilton
- Lawrence
- Mason
- Perry
- Rome
- Symmes
- Union
- Upper
- Washington
- Windsor

=== Census-designated places ===
- Burlington
- Miller

=== Unincorporated communities ===
- Andis
- Eifort
- Etna
- Firebrick
- Kitts Hill
- Pedro
- Rock Camp
- Scottown
- Waterloo
- Willow Wood

== See also ==
- National Register of Historic Places listings in Lawrence County, Ohio
