= Willow Wood, Ohio =

Unincorporated community in Ohio, U.S.

Coordinates: 38°33′40″N 82°28′05″W

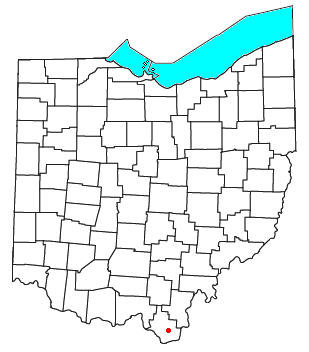
Location of Willow Wood, Ohio

Willow Wood is an unincorporated community in western Windsor Township, Lawrence County, Ohio, United States, along Symmes Creek. It has a post office with the ZIP code 45696.

== Education ==
Children in the Willow Wood area attend the Symmes Valley Multilevel and High Schools.

Willow Wood has a public library, a branch of Briggs Lawrence County Public Library.
