= Wayne National Forest =

Protected area in Ohio, USA

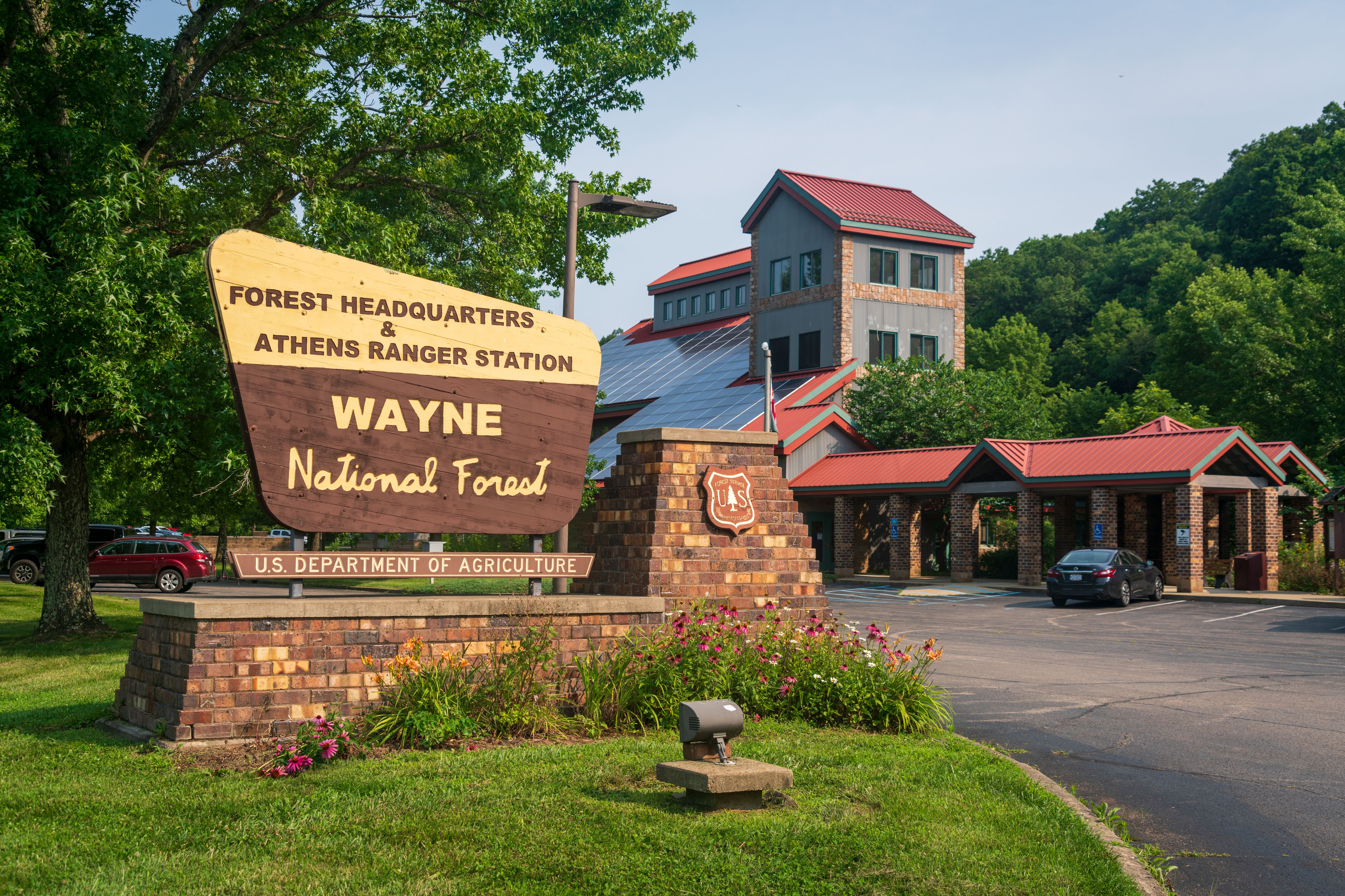
- Headquarters and Athens Ranger Station

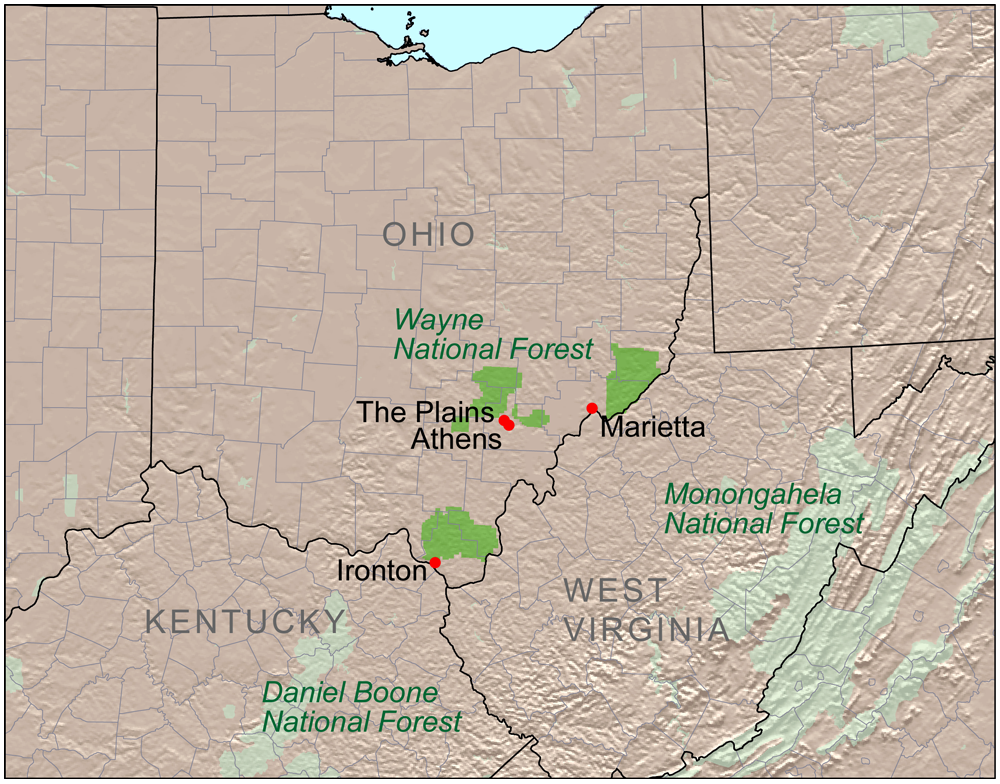
- Location of Wayne National Forest
- Location: Ohio, United States
- Coordinates: 39°30′0″N 82°0′0″W
- Area: 240,101 acres (971.65 km^{2})
- Established: December 1992
- Named for: Anthony Wayne
- Website: Wayne National Forest

The Wayne National Forest is located in the Appalachian part of the US state of Ohio, in the Unglaciated Allegheny Plateau. It is the first and only national forest in Ohio. Forest headquarters are located between The Plains and Nelsonville, Ohio, on US Route 33 overlooking the Hocking River.

The North Country Trail passes through several areas of Wayne, in which it is coincident with the Buckeye Trail and the American Discovery Trail. The area of Ohio included within the national forest is based on late Paleozoic geology, heavy in sandstones and shales, including redbeds, with many coal beds. The topography is typically very rugged, with elevation changes typically in the 200–400-foot range.

== History ==
The land on which the forest exists and grows was consigned to the United States by the Northwestern Confederacy in 1795 as part of the Treaty of Greenville. It is in the state of Ohio, which was named for an indigenous word translating to "Good River."

During the late 18th and 19th century, the forested land was cleared for agricultural and lumbering use, but years of poor timbering and agricultural practices led to severe erosion and poor soil composition. The Wayne National Forest was started as part of a reforestation program. The national forest was originally established in 1935 with the first land acquisitions. In 1949, the administration of the forest was placed under the Hoosier National Forest, consolidated as the "Wayne-Hoosier National Forest", with headquarters in Indiana. In December 1992, the Wayne National Forest was established as a distinct national forest, with its administration and headquarters moving to southeast Ohio. It was unofficially referred to as the Ohio National Forest initially and was later officially named the Wayne National Forest in honor of General Anthony Wayne, an American soldier, officer, statesman, and one of the Founding Fathers of the United States.

In 2022, approximately 1,300 acres (530 ha) of the forest were burned by fires that were deliberately set by a former fire department administrator and police officer. In 2025, the culprit was sentenced to 18 months in prison and required to pay $368,000 in restitution.

On April 4, 2024, the Biden Administration proposed that fracking be permitted in the forest, a plan which drew widespread criticism. The administration's Bureau of Land Management announced it would open 40,000 acres (16,000 ha) of the Wayne to fracking for oil and gas. The new proposal, released in late March 2024, is nearly identical to the fracking plan that was blocked in 2020 by a federal judge after conservation groups had challenged it in federal court.

On May 23, 2024, The Wayne National Forest planted a Moon Tree sapling at its Forest Headquarters building in Nelsonville, Ohio, as part of an initiative between NASA and the U.S. Forest Service. The sweetgum sapling was one of fewer than 1,500 seedlings flown thousands of miles beyond the moon aboard the unmanned Orion spacecraft, spending six weeks in space during NASA’s Artemis I mission that had launched on November 16, 2022.

== Geography ==
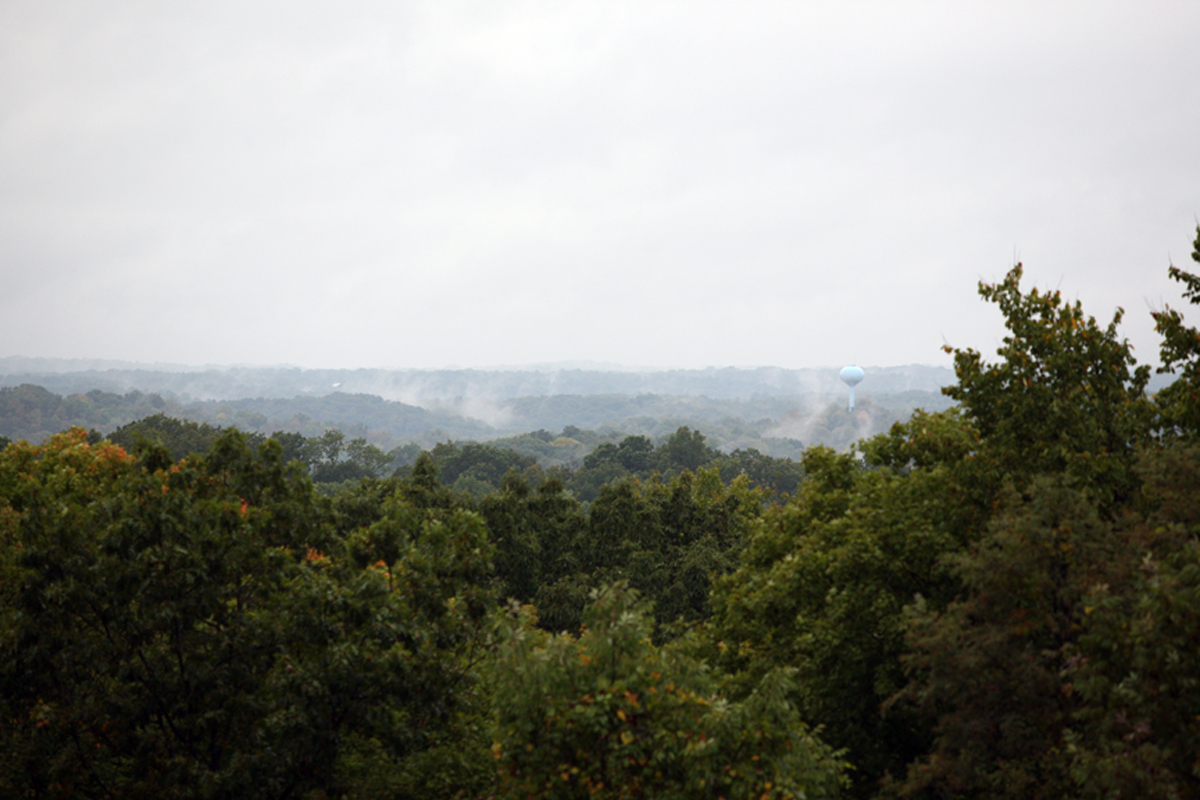
The Appalachian Mountains in Wayne National Forest

The forest comprises three administrative and purchase units: Athens, Marietta, and Ironton. The Athens and Marietta Units are managed together as the Athens Ranger District, while the Ironton Unit is managed as the Ironton Ranger District. Many of the lands included in the national forest are former coal-mining lands, and much of this land is owned by the federal government without the mineral rights, those having been retained by former owners.

As of September 2018, Wayne National Forest has 244,265 acres (989 km^{2}) in federal ownership within a proclamation boundary of 832,147 acres (3,368 km^{2}).

- The Athens Unit is located in Athens, Hocking, Morgan, Perry, and Vinton Counties, and includes 67,224 acres (272 km²) as of 2002. It features the Wildcat Hollow Trail, a hiking trail just northeast of Burr Oak State Park in Morgan County; the Stone Church Horse Trail in Perry County; the Utah Ridge Recreation Area in Athens County, and the Dorr Run ATV Trails in Hocking County.
- The Marietta Unit is located in Monroe, Noble, and Washington Counties, and includes 63,381 acres (256 km²) as of 2002, with over half of the total being within Washington County.
- The Ironton Unit is located in Gallia, Jackson, Lawrence, and Scioto Counties, and includes 99,049 acres (401 km²) as of 2002, with over two-thirds of the total being within Lawrence County.

== Flora and fauna ==
The forest is dominated by mixed mesophytic hardwood communities. Common overstory species include oak, hickory, red maple, sugar maple, American beech, tulip tree (yellow poplar), black cherry, and ash. Eastern hemlock and white pine occur in cooler ravines and along shaded stream corridors, while shortleaf pine and Virginia pine are found in some upland and reclaimed areas. The understory features species such as pawpaw, spicebush, flowering dogwood, eastern redbud, and serviceberry. Spring wildflowers are abundant, including trillium, mayapple, bloodroot, spring beauty, and various violets.

Mammals commonly found in the forest include white-tailed deer, eastern gray squirrel, fox squirrel, raccoon, opossum, striped skunk, coyote, red fox, and bobcat. Smaller mammals such as chipmunks, voles, bats, and shrews are also present. The forest supports significant bird diversity, serving as breeding habitat for many neotropical migratory songbirds. Species include wood thrush, scarlet tanager, cerulean warbler, ovenbird, barred owl, wild turkey, and various woodpeckers and hawks. Bald eagles and osprey have increasingly been observed near rivers and larger reservoirs. Reptiles and amphibians can be found throughout the forest’s extensive stream network and wetlands. Species include eastern box turtle, timber rattlesnake, black rat snake, northern water snake, American toad, spring peeper, and several salamander species, including red-backed and spotted salamanders.

== Proposed renaming ==
On August 21, 2023, the U.S. Forest Service proposed changing the forest's name to "Buckeye National Forest" after considering other names that included "Ohio National Forest" (its first unofficial name) and "Koteewa National Forest" (Shawnee word for Buckeye). Some supporters of changing the name, including the City Council of Athens in an official letter dated September 5, 2023, prefer "Ohio National Forest," or "Pawpaw National Forest" for the official state native fruit, to be chosen instead of "Buckeye National Forest." The change, if adopted by U.S. Secretary of Agriculture Tom Vilsack, would cost $400,000 to implement. The call to change the name was initiated primarily by American Indian tribes who objected to its namesake of Anthony Wayne. Opposition to changing the name centers on preserving Wayne's impact to Ohio, critiques of pop history (citing Wayne's complexity), and the violence caused by both tribes and settlers.

== See also ==
- Appalachia
- Appalachian Ohio
- Appalachian Mountains
- List of national forests of the United States
