= Ohio State Route 607 (1980s–2000s) =

Former state highway in Lawrence County, Ohio, US

State Route 607
- Former SR 607 highlighted in red; SR 607T highlighted in green

Route information
- Maintained by ODOT
- Length: 0.44 mi (710 m)
- Existed: 1986–2006

Major junctions
- South end: WV 106 near Huntington, WV
- North end: SR 7 near Proctorville, OH

Location
- Country: United States
- State: Ohio
- Counties: Lawrence

Highway system
- Ohio State Highway System; Interstate; US; State; Scenic
← SR 606	→ SR 608

Ohio State Route 607 (SR 607) was a north–south state highway in the southern portion of the U.S. state of Ohio. Its southern terminus was on the East Huntington Bridge over the Ohio River at the West Virginia state line near Proctorville where West Virginia Route 106 continues south. SR 607's northern terminus was at SR 7 and SR 243 west of Proctorville.

== Route description ==
The majority of SR 607 was on the East Huntington Bridge. The route started at the Ohio–West Virginia state line over the Ohio River. Less than one-half mile (0.80 km) later, the route curved to the south and ended at SR 7 and SR 243 near Proctorville.

== History ==
The East Huntington Bridge was built in 1985, and a year later, SR 607 was designated.

=== Chesapeake Bypass and State Route 607T ===
State Route 607T
- Location: Proctorville, Ohio
- Length: 0.55 mi (890 m)
- Existed: 2004–2006

As a part of the Chesapeake Bypass project, SR 607 was temporarily extended north of SR 7 and SR 243 along a new bypass alignment to Irene Road in 2004. The extension was known as SR 607T. In 2006, SR 7 was moved onto this road and SR 775 was extended south to replace SR 607.

== Major intersections ==
County	Location	mi	km	Destinations	Notes
Cabell	Huntington			WV 106 south to WV 2 – Huntington	
Ohio River		0.0	0.0	East Huntington Bridge	
Lawrence	Proctorville	0.44	0.71	SR 7 / SR 243 – Proctorville, Chesapeake	
1.000 mi = 1.609 km; 1.000 km = 0.621 mi
