= Mercerville, Ohio =

- Unincorporated community
- Location within Ohio Location within the United States
- Coordinates: 38°39′45″N 82°16′19″W
- Country: United States
- State: Ohio
- County: Gallia
- Elevation: 768 ft (234 m)
- Time zone: UTC-5 (Eastern (EST))
  - Summer (DST): UTC-4 (EDT)
- Area codes: 740 & 220
- GNIS feature ID: 1076378

Mercerville is an unincorporated community in Gallia County in southern Ohio, approximately seven miles (11 km) north of Crown City and 25 miles (40 km) northeast of Huntington, West Virginia, near the easternmost corner of Wayne National Forest and roughly five miles (8.0 km) west of the Ohio River, where Ohio borders West Virginia. Mercerville sits along State Route 218 (SR 218) near its intersection with SR 790. It is home to South Gallia High School and nearby Hannan Trace Elementary School.

Mercerville is often mistaken for Crown City because Mercerville does not have its own US Post Office, much in the same way that nearby Rio Grande, Ohio, mailing addresses all say Bidwell.
