= Ohio State Route 326 =

State Route 326

Route information
- Maintained by ODOT

Location
- Country: United States
- State: Ohio

Highway system
- Ohio State Highway System; Interstate; US; State; Scenic
← SR 325	→ SR 327

In Ohio, State Route 326 may refer to:

- Ohio State Route 326 (1930s), a former state highway in Lucas County
- Ohio State Route 326 (1930s-1960s), a former state highway in Marietta, Washington County
