= Ohio State Route 850 =

State highway in Gallia County, Ohio, US

State Route 850

Route information
- Maintained by ODOT
- Length: 5.04 mi (8.11 km)
- Existed: 1995–present

Major junctions
- South end: SR 588 in Rodney
- US 35 near Rio Grande
- North end: SR 554 in Bidwell

Location
- Country: United States
- State: Ohio
- Counties: Gallia

Highway system
- Ohio State Highway System; Interstate; US; State; Scenic
← SR 844	→ SR 852

State Route 850 (SR 850) is a north–south state highway in Gallia County, Ohio, United States. Its southern terminus is at SR 588 in the hamlet of Rodney, which is west of Gallipolis. SR 850's northern terminus is at SR 554 in Bidwell. The route has an interchange with U.S. Route 35 (US 35), but otherwise intersects with no other numbered routes.

== Route description ==
All of SR 850 runs within Gallia County. The route is not inclusive within the National Highway System.

== History ==
SR 850 was created in 1995 along its current routing between SR 588 and SR 554, designated in approximately the same timeframe that the US 35 freeway was completed east of Rio Grande. No significant changes have taken place to the highway's routing since its designation.

== Recent Developments ==
The Ohio Department of Transportation (ODOT) has proposed improvements to two sections of SR 850 in Springfield Township, Gallia County. These enhancements aim to widen the roadway and add rumble strips to improve safety. The proposed changes also include expanding the shoulders and grading them for better drainage and vehicle recovery. Construction will begin in spring 2026 and end in the summer of 2027, and the estimated cost is $9,200,000.

== Major intersections ==
The entire route is in Gallia County.

Location	mi	km	Destinations	Notes
Green Township	0.00	0.00	SR 588	Southern terminus
Springfield Township	1.95– 2.05	3.14– 3.30	US 35 – Gallipolis, Jackson	Diamond interchange
Springfield Township	5.04	8.11	SR 554 / Vale Road	Northern terminus
1.000 mi = 1.609 km; 1.000 km = 0.621 mi

== See also ==
- List of state highways in Ohio
- List of highways numbered 850
