= Ohio State Route 243 =

State highway in Lawrence County, Ohio, US

State Route 243

Route information
- Maintained by ODOT
- Length: 18.39 mi (29.60 km)
- Existed: 1925–present

Major junctions
- West end: US 52 in Coal Grove
- East end: SR 7 near Proctorville

Location
- Country: United States
- State: Ohio
- Counties: Lawrence

Highway system
- Ohio State Highway System; Interstate; US; State; Scenic
← SR 242	→ SR 244

State Route 243 (SR 243) is an east–west state highway in the southern portion of the U.S. state of Ohio. The western terminus of SR 243 is at a diamond interchange with the U.S. Route 52 (US 52) in Coal Grove. The eastern terminus of the state highway is at its signalized junction with State Route 7 approximately 1.25 miles (2.01 km) west of Proctorville near the northern banks of the Ohio River.

SR 243 used to continue east from here, running concurrently with SR 7 into Proctorville, then split briefly from SR 7 as it passed through the community of Rome before ending at SR 7 about 3 miles (4.8 km) east of Proctorville.

== History ==
SR 243 between SR 7, in Proctorville, and SR 7 northeast of Proctorville, was signed in 1923 as SR 219. In 1925, SR 219 was replaced by SR 243. This section of road was paved in 1929. The western terminus was moved west to Coal Grove, concurrent with SR 7 through Proctorville, in 1932. The paving of the route between Coal Grove and Proctorville was completed by 1955. On December 11, 2006, SR 243 was truncated to its present location following completion of the new SR 775 by-pass of Proctorville, which SR 7 was re-routed onto, leaving jurisdiction of the former routings of SR 7 and SR 243 through Proctorville to be turned over from the state to the local jurisdictions.

== Major intersections ==
The entire route is in Lawrence County.

Location	mi	km	Destinations	Notes
Coal Grove	0.00	0.00	US 52 / US 52 Bus. west – Chesapeake, Portsmouth, Ironton	Interchange; eastern terminus of US 52 Bus.
Union Township	11.59	18.65	SR 378 north	Southern terminus of SR 378
Union Township	18.39	29.60	SR 7	
1.000 mi = 1.609 km; 1.000 km = 0.621 mi
