= Ohio State Route 553 =

State highway in Gallia County, Ohio, US

State Route 553

Route information
- Maintained by ODOT
- Length: 2.33 mi (3.75 km)
- Existed: 1937–present

Major junctions
- South end: SR 7 in Crown City
- North end: SR 218 near Crown City

Location
- Country: United States
- State: Ohio
- Counties: Gallia

Highway system
- Ohio State Highway System; Interstate; US; State; Scenic
← SR 552	→ SR 554

State Route 553 (SR 553) is a north–south state highway in the southern portion of the U.S. state of Ohio. SR 553 has its southern terminus at a T-intersection with SR 7 in Crown City. The route's northern terminus is at SR 218 approximately two miles (3.2 km) northwest of Crown City.

Created in the late 1930s, this highway in extreme southern Gallia County acts primarily as a connector roadway between SR 7 and SR 218. SR 553 is a steep, narrow, and somewhat dangerous route with a large incline from the Ohio River valley heading north into Wayne National Forest.

== Route description ==
All of SR 553 is located in the southern portion of Gallia County. The highway is not included as a part of the National Highway System.

SR 553 begins at a T-intersection with SR 7 in the village of Crown City. From this intersection, it ends up being an uphill trend for the state highway for its entirety, as it climbs out of the Ohio River valley. Overall, the route traverses forested terrain, as it goes through the Wayne National Forest, but it does pass amid some open spaces and the occasional home along its way. SR 553 heads northwesterly from SR 7, and departs Crown City after a few blocks, entering into rural Guyan Township. At the Southers Road intersection, the highway turns east then promptly bends back north. At Sowards Ridge Road, the highway turns back to the northwest. While following a rather curvy path, the highway overall trends in a northwesterly direction, passing into an area that is more open prior to arriving at its endpoint at its junction with SR 218.

== History ==
The roadway that now carries the SR 553 designation was originally a part of SR 218 prior to 1926. SR 218 was re-routed onto its present alignment in that year, and the roadway was placed under local jurisdiction. In 1937, this same stretch of roadway was brought back into the state highway system, and given the designation of SR 553. Since its inception, SR 553 has not experienced any significant changes to its routing.

== Major intersections ==
The entire route is in Gallia County.

Location	mi	km	Destinations	Notes
Crown City	0.00	0.00	SR 7	
Guyan Township	2.33	3.75	SR 218	
1.000 mi = 1.609 km; 1.000 km = 0.621 mi
