= Ohio State Route 790 =

State highway in southeastern Ohio, US

State Route 790

Route information
- Maintained by ODOT
- Length: 7.24 mi (11.65 km)
- Existed: 1937–present

Major junctions
- West end: SR 775 in Lecta
- East end: SR 218 near Mercerville

Location
- Country: United States
- State: Ohio
- Counties: Lawrence, Gallia

Highway system
- Ohio State Highway System; Interstate; US; State; Scenic
← SR 788	→ SR 791

State Route 790 (SR 790) is an east–west state highway in southeastern Ohio, a U.S. state. Traversing the Wayne National Forest for its duration, SR 790's western terminus is at SR 775 in the unincorporated community of Lecta. Its eastern terminus is at SR 218 about 1 mile (1.6 km) north of the hamlet of Mercerville.

== Route description ==
No portion of SR 790 is included within the National Highway System, a system of highways that are deemed most important for the country's economy, defense and mobility.

== History ==
SR 790 came into existence in 1937. When first designated, it was an L-shaped route that began at SR 217 in Scottown, followed today's Lawrence County Road 37 northerly up to Lecta, ran concurrent with SR 775 northerly for one block, then turned east to follow its current alignment to SR 218 near Mercerville. By 1955, the official state transportation map indicated that jurisdiction of the stretch of SR 790 from Scottown to Lecta had been transferred to Lawrence County, and the highway took on the look that it does today. No other major changes have taken place to the routing of SR 790 since that time.

== Major intersections ==
County	Location	mi	km	Destinations	Notes
Lawrence	Mason Township	0.00	0.00	SR 775	
Gallia	Guyan Township	7.24	11.65	SR 218	
1.000 mi = 1.609 km; 1.000 km = 0.621 mi
