= Ohio State Route 218 =

State highway in southern Ohio, US

State Route 218

Route information
- Maintained by ODOT
- Length: 19.51 mi (31.40 km)
- Existed: 1924–present

Major junctions
- South end: SR 217 near Athalia
- North end: SR 7 near Gallipolis

Location
- Country: United States
- State: Ohio
- Counties: Lawrence, Gallia

Highway system
- Ohio State Highway System; Interstate; US; State; Scenic
← SR 217	→ SR 219

State Route 218 (SR 218) is a north–south state highway in the southern portion of the U.S. state of Ohio. The southern terminus of State Route 218 is at a T-intersection with State Route 217 approximately 5 miles (8.0 km) northwest of Athalia. Its northern terminus is at a T-intersection with State Route 7 about 2 miles (3.2 km) south of Gallipolis.

== Route description ==
State Route 218 travels through portions of Lawrence and Gallia. There are no segments of this state route that are incorporated within the National Highway System. It stays as a two-lane road for the whole way.

== History ==
When it was first established in 1924, State Route 218 consisted of the entirety of the current routing of State Route 553 from State Route 7 in Crown City northwesterly to its junction with State Route 218, and the current alignment of State Route 218 from the State Route 553 intersection northeasterly to its current northern terminus at State Route 7 south of Gallipolis. Two years later, the southern end of the highway was realigned. From its current junction with State Route 553, State Route 218 was routed southwesterly along a previously un-numbered roadway to what is now State Route 218's southern terminus at State Route 217.

== Major intersections ==
County	Location	mi	km	Destinations	Notes
Lawrence	Rome Township	0.00	0.00	SR 217	
Gallia	Guyan Township	6.25	10.06	SR 553 east / CR 182 (Wells Run Road) – Crown City	Western terminus of SR 553
Gallia	Guyan Township	10.91	17.56	SR 790 west – Lecta	Eastern terminus of SR 790
Gallia	Gallipolis Township	19.51	31.40	SR 7 – Gallipolis, Crown City	
1.000 mi = 1.609 km; 1.000 km = 0.621 mi
