= Ohio State Route 326 (1930s–1960s) =

Defunct state highway in Washington County, Ohio, US

State Route 326
- Routing of SR 326 in relation to modern roads

Route information
- Maintained by ODOT
- Length: 2.1 mi (3.4 km)
- Existed: 1930s–by 1969

Major junctions
- West end: US 21 / US 50 Alt. / SR 7 in Marietta
- East end: SR 375 in Marietta

Location
- Country: United States
- State: Ohio
- Counties: Washington

Highway system
- Ohio State Highway System; Interstate; US; State; Scenic
← SR 325	→ SR 327

State Route 326 (SR 326) was a short state highway in Marietta, Ohio that existed from the mid-1930s to the late 1960s. The route was only 2 miles (3.2 km) long and connected the former U.S. Route 21 (US 21), US 50 Alternate, and SR 7 in downtown Marietta with SR 375 near the northern limits of the city.

== Route description ==
SR 326 began at the intersection of Washington and 3rd Streets in downtown Marietta. Throughout the existence of SR 326, 3rd Street carried US 21, US 50 Alternate, and SR 7 (it now has SR 7 and SR 60). SR 326 headed northeast along Washington Street through a residential neighborhood. Towards the end of its run on Washington Street and adjacent to the Oak Grove Cemetery, the route began climbing a hill. The route made a sharp hairpin turn and climbed an even steeper hill towards the Emerson Heights neighborhood. At the top of the hill, SR 326 wound its way around the tops of adjacent hills before ending at Glendale Road which was at the time SR 375.

== History ==
This SR 326 is not related to another SR 326 that was previously signed for about two years in Lucas County.

The road that became SR 326 was part of the state highway system by 1935 but was not designated as such on the official Ohio state maps until 1946. The route had been asphalt-paved since its inclusion into the state highway system. The route was one of many short state highways in the Marietta area which included SR 351 and SR 375. SR 326 would not experience any major changes until the late 1960s, around the time Interstate 77 was completed through the area. By 1969, SR 326 was removed from the state highway system.

== Major intersections ==
The entire route was in Marietta, Washington County.

mi	km	Destinations	Notes
0.0	0.0	US 21 (3rd Street) / US 50 Alt. / SR 7 (Washington Street) – Beverly, Matamoras, Belpre, Athens	
2.1	3.4	SR 375 (Glendale Road)	
1.000 mi = 1.609 km; 1.000 km = 0.621 mi
