= Ohio State Route 217 =

State highway in Lawrence County, Ohio, US

State Route 217

Route information
- Maintained by ODOT
- Length: 17.47 mi (28.12 km)
- Existed: 1924–present

Major junctions
- West end: SR 141 near Kitts Hill
- East end: SR 7 near Athalia

Location
- Country: United States
- State: Ohio
- Counties: Lawrence

Highway system
- Ohio State Highway System; Interstate; US; State; Scenic
← SR 216	→ SR 218

State Route 217 (SR 217) is an east–west state highway in the southern portion of the U.S. state of Ohio. The western terminus of State Route 217 is at a T-intersection with State Route 141 approximately 1.75 miles (2.82 km) east of the unincorporated community of Kitts Hill. Its eastern terminus is at State Route 7 nearly 1.25 miles (2.01 km) north of the village of Athalia. The route mainly passes through some hilly terrain and drops in elevation before reaching the Ohio River valley.

== Route description ==
State Route 217 runs exclusively within Lawrence County. No segment of the route is incorporated within the National Highway System, a system of highways important for the country's economy, mobility and defense.

== History ==
Making its debut in 1924, State Route 217 has followed the same general routing between State Route 141 and State Route 7 from its inception to the present day. It has not experienced any major changes to its alignment since it was established.

== Major intersections ==
The entire route is in Lawrence County.

Location	mi	km	Destinations	Notes
Lawrence Township	0.00	0.00	SR 141	
Windsor Township	5.75	9.25	SR 378 north	Western end of SR 378 concurrency
Windsor Township	6.34	10.20	SR 378 south	Eastern end of SR 378 concurrency
Windsor Township	10.70	17.22	SR 775 south	Western end of SR 775 concurrency
Windsor Township	10.98	17.67	SR 775 north	Eastern end of SR 775 concurrency
Rome Township	13.59	21.87	SR 218 north	Southern terminus of SR 218
Rome Township	17.47	28.12	SR 7 / State Street	
1.000 mi = 1.609 km; 1.000 km = 0.621 mi: Concurrency terminus
