= Ohio State Route 588 =

State highway in Gallia County, Ohio, US

State Route 588

Route information
- Maintained by ODOT
- Length: 11.74 mi (18.89 km)
- Existed: 1947–present

Major junctions
- West end: SR 325 in Rio Grande
- East end: SR 7 in Gallipolis

Location
- Country: United States
- State: Ohio
- Counties: Gallia

Highway system
- Ohio State Highway System; Interstate; US; State; Scenic
← SR 587	→ SR 589

State Route 588 (SR 588) is an east–west state highway in the southeastern portion of the U.S. state of Ohio. The western terminus of SR 588 is at SR 325 in Rio Grande. Its eastern terminus is at a signalized intersection with SR 7 in downtown Gallipolis.

== Route description ==
SR 588 runs entirely within the central part of Gallia County. No portion of SR 588 is included as a part of the National Highway System, a system of highways that are considered most important for the economy, mobility and defense of the country.

== History ==
SR 588 was designated in 1947. It was originally routed along its present alignment between the Jackson Pike (present-day County Road 35) intersection southeast of Rio Grande and its current eastern terminus at SR 7 in Gallipolis. At that time, the combination of present SR 588 northwest of what was its western terminus at the time and Jackson Pike southeast of that point were a part of US 35. When the entirety of the US 35 freeway was completed through Gallia County by 1992, SR 588 was extended northwest from its previous western terminus along the former routing of US 35 to its current western terminus at SR 325 in Rio Grande.

== Major intersections ==
The entire route is in Gallia County.

Location	mi	km	Destinations	Notes
Rio Grande	0.00	0.00	SR 325 (West College Avenue) to US 35	
Green Township	5.18	8.34	SR 850 north	Southern terminus of SR 850
Gallipolis	11.74	18.89	SR 7 (Second Avenue) / State Street	
1.000 mi = 1.609 km; 1.000 km = 0.621 mi
