= Ohio State Route 141 =

State highway in southeastern Ohio, US

State Route 141

Route information
- Maintained by ODOT
- Length: 45.09 mi (72.57 km)
- Existed: 1924–present

Major junctions
- West end: US 52 in Ironton
- East end: SR 7 in Gallipolis

Location
- Country: United States
- State: Ohio
- Counties: Lawrence, Gallia

Highway system
- Ohio State Highway System; Interstate; US; State; Scenic
← SR 140	→ SR 142

State Route 141 (SR 141) is an east–west highway crossing through southeast Ohio, though it predominantly runs more north–south. Its western terminus is at U.S. Route 52 in Ironton. The eastern terminus at State Route 7 is in Gallipolis. The route is very scenic as it travels through rural areas of Lawrence and Gallia Counties. The road is hilliest in the westernmost 12 miles (19 km). As you move further east, the road becomes somewhat flatter as it often parallels Symmes Creek. Traveling the road from end to end, one will cross Symmes Creek five times and pass through several communities including Ironton, Hecla, Kitts Hill, Aid, Wilgus, Arabia, Waterloo, Cadmus, Gage, Centenary, and Gallipolis. Symmes Valley High School and Symmes Valley Elementary School are also located along State Route 141, just to the east of Aid. Because of the close proximity to Symmes Creek through the central portion of the route, the roadway is sometimes flooded in rainy periods. This occurs most notably just south of Cadmus. The route in Gallia County is scenic in that there are several Amish settlements.

== Major junctions ==
County	Location	mi	km	Destinations	Notes
Lawrence	Ironton	0.00	0.00	US 52 / Campbell Drive – Portsmouth, Chesapeake	Interchange
Lawrence	Lawrence Township	8.43	13.57	SR 217 east	Western terminus of SR 217
Lawrence	Aid Township	13.14	21.15	SR 378 south	Northern terminus of SR 378
Lawrence	Mason Township	16.37	26.34	SR 775	
Gallia	Perry Township	30.68	49.37	SR 233 north – Oak Hill	Southern terminus of SR 233
Gallia	Perry Township	33.78	54.36	SR 325 north	Southern terminus of SR 325
Gallia	Green Township	38.97	62.72	SR 775 south – Lecta	Northern terminus of SR 775
Gallia	Gallipolis	45.09	72.57	SR 7	
1.000 mi = 1.609 km; 1.000 km = 0.621 mi
