= Ohio State Route 775 =

State highway in southern Ohio, US

State Route 775

Route information
- Maintained by ODOT
- Length: 35.26 mi (56.75 km)
- Existed: 1937–present

Major junctions
- South end: WV 106 near Proctorville
- SR 7 in Proctorville
- North end: SR 141 near Gallipolis

Location
- Country: United States
- State: Ohio
- Counties: Lawrence, Gallia

Highway system
- Ohio State Highway System; Interstate; US; State; Scenic
← SR 774	→ SR 776

State Route 775 (SR 775) is a 31.49-mile-long (50.68 km) north–south state route in the southern portion of the U.S. state of Ohio. Its southern terminus is on the East Huntington Bridge with the unmarked West Virginia Route 106 south of Proctorville, and its northern terminus is at SR 141 nearly 7 miles (11 km) west of Gallipolis. Most of the route is a rural two-lane highway and passes through woodland. The same of its path, SR 775, passing through the Wayne National Forest. The route was commissioned in the mid-1930s and the highway was paved by the late 1950s. The route was extended in the mid-2000s, to its current southern terminus.

== Route description ==
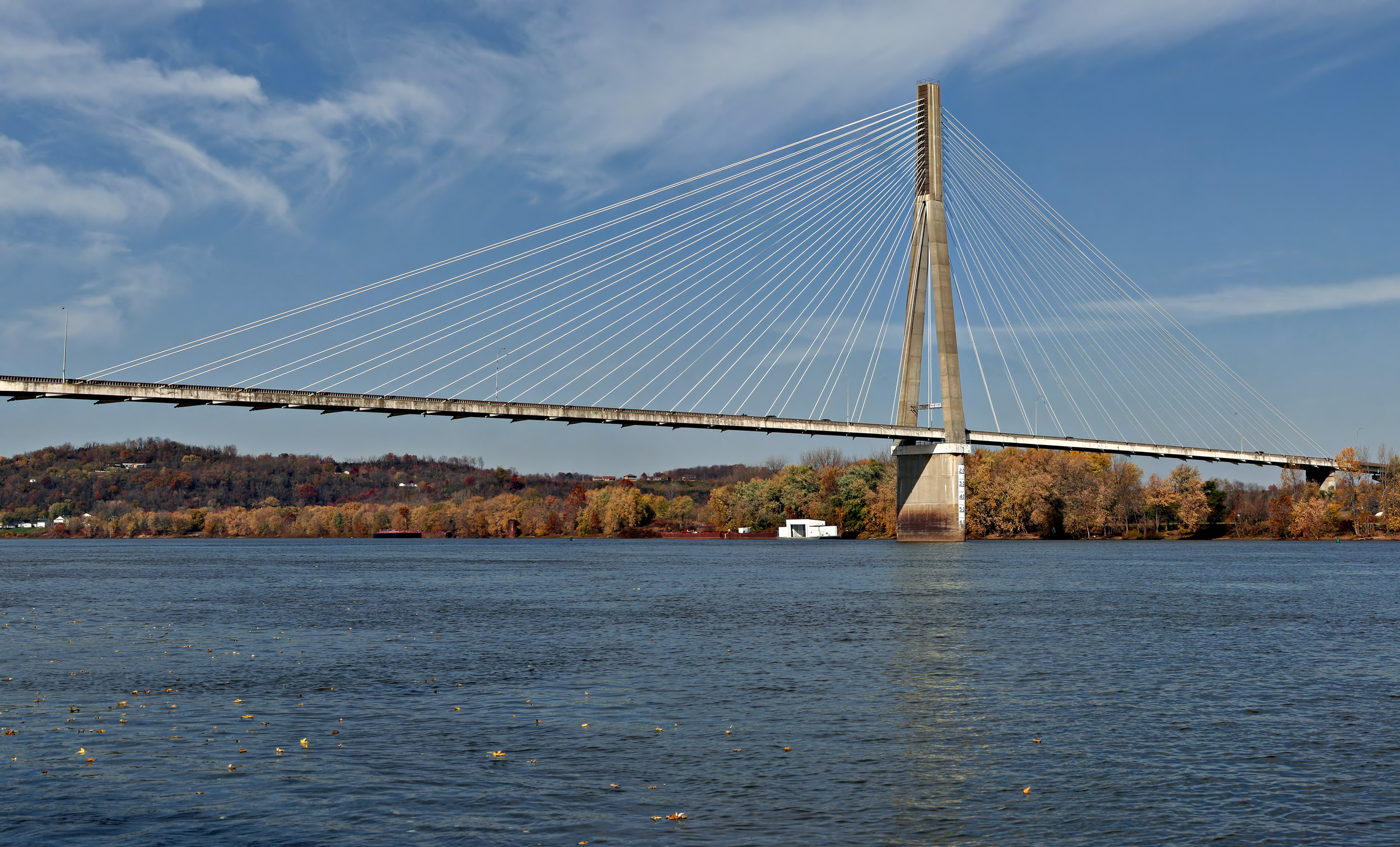
East Huntington Bridge, the southern terminus of SR 775

SR 775 begins on the East Huntington Bridge over the Ohio River at the West Virginia state line. Here, SR 775 has its highest traffic counts; the road has an average annual daily traffic (AADT) of 18,520 vehicles based on a 2012 Ohio Department of Transportation (ODOT) survey. The route heads north leaving the bridge and having an intersection with SR 7. SR 775 and SR 7 head northeasterly concurrent leaving Proctorville. The road passes near commercial and residential properties, as a three-lane highway, two-lane northbound and one-lane southbound. The highway has a traffic signal with Lawrence County Road 430 (CR 430), before becoming a two-lane highway. North of CR 403, the highway passes near residential properties and some woodland. In rural Lawrence County, SR 775 leaves SR 7 and heads towards the north-northwest. The route passes through woodland, with some houses, as a two-lane highway. The highway has a brief concurrency with SR 217, before entering the Wayne National Forest. The highway has an intersection with SR 141, at this intersection SR 775 turns northeasterly. North of SR 141, the AADT of SR 775 drops to 200 vehicles. The road has a T-intersection with SR 790, before turning towards the northwest and entering Gallia County. In Gallia County the highway begins to curve the north, before curving to the northeast. SR 775 has its northern terminus at a T-intersection with SR 141, in the Wayne National Forest. The only section of highway that is concurrent with SR 7 is incorporated within the National Highway System (NHS).

== History ==
SR 775 was commissioned in 1937 on the same route as today. The entire route was paved by 1959. The route was extended to the East Huntington Bridge in 2006, concurrent with SR 7 and replacing SR 607.

== Major intersections ==
County	Location	mi	km	Destinations	Notes
Ohio River		0.00	0.00	Frank "Gunner" Gatski Memorial Bridge (WV 106 south) to WV 2 – Huntington	Continuation into West Virginia
Lawrence	Proctorville	0.33	0.53	SR 7 south – Proctorville	Interchange via connector road; southern end of SR 7 concurrency
Lawrence	Union Township	1.20	1.93	SR 7 north	Northern end of SR 7 concurrency
Lawrence	Windsor Township	9.25	14.89	SR 217 west	Southern end of SR 217 concurrency
Lawrence	Windsor Township	9.53	15.34	SR 217 east	Northern end of SR 217 concurrency
Lawrence	Mason Township	16.97	27.31	SR 141	
Lawrence	Mason Township	23.69	38.13	SR 790 east	Western terminus of SR 790
Gallia	Green Township	35.26	56.75	SR 141	Northern terminus of SR 775
1.000 mi = 1.609 km; 1.000 km = 0.621 mi: Concurrency terminus
