= Ohio State Route 767 =

State highway in Belmont County, Ohio, US

State Route 767

Route information
- Maintained by ODOT
- Length: 0.30 mi (480 m)

Major junctions
- South end: SR 7 in Bridgeport
- North end: US 40 / US 250 / SR 7A in Bridgeport

Location
- Country: United States
- State: Ohio
- Counties: Belmont

Highway system
- Ohio State Highway System; Interstate; US; State; Scenic
← SR 764	→ SR 768

State Route 767 (SR 767) is a north–south state highway in the eastern portion of the U.S. state of Ohio. Currently, it is signed as an alternate route of SR 7. Its southern terminus is at an exit ramp on SR 7 in Bridgeport. The route serves as a connector from northbound SR 7 to SR 7 Alternate, US 40, and US 250. The route's northern terminus is where these U.S. routes overlap eastbound to cross the Ohio River into West Virginia. SR 7A serves as a connector for all of these routes to I-70.

== Major intersections ==
The entire route is in Bridgeport, Belmont County.

mi	km	Destinations	Notes
0.00– 0.08	0.00– 0.13	SR 7	Northbound exit from and southbound entrance to SR 7
0.11	0.18	SR 7A (Howard Street) / South Lincoln Avenue	Western (southern) terminus of SR 7A
0.30	0.48	US 40 / US 250 (Main Street) / SR 7A	Eastern (northern) terminus of SR 7A
1.000 mi = 1.609 km; 1.000 km = 0.621 mi: Incomplete access
