= Ohio State Route 242 =

State highway in Darke County, Ohio, US

State Route 242

- Map of SR 242 c. 2012

Route information
- Maintained by ODOT
- Length: 3.67 mi (5.91 km)
- Existed: 1924–2013

Major junctions
- West end: US 127 near Greenville
- East end: SR 121 near Versailles

Location
- Country: United States
- State: Ohio
- Counties: Darke

Highway system
- Ohio State Highway System; Interstate; US; State; Scenic
← SR 241	→ SR 243

State Route 242 (SR 242) was an east–west state highway in the west-central portion of Ohio. The western terminus of the route was at U.S. Route 127, approximately 5 miles (8.0 km) north of Greenville. Its eastern terminus was at a T-intersection with SR 121, adjacent to Darke County Airport about 1.5 miles (2.4 km) southwest of Versailles.

Created in the middle of the 1920s, SR 242 ran through very flat farm country in the northeastern portion of Darke County. The highway abutted the western and northern edges of Darke County Airport along the way. The entire route was turned over to county and township control around 2013 in conjunction with a plan to extend the runway of the Darke County Airport.

== Route description ==
SR 242 was nestled entirely within the northeastern quadrant of Darke County. The route was not included in the National Highway System.

The route began at the rural Richland Township intersection of US 127 and Reed Road. The vast majority of the state highway passed through farmland, with the occasional home appearing along the way. Heading due east from the U.S. Route 127 intersection, SR 242 immediately intersected Greenville-St. Marys Road, then proceeded among the vastness of crops, meeting Schroder Road and Younker Road en route before arriving at the Horner Road intersection. Here, SR 242 turned north onto the alignment of Horner Road, with the road continuing east from the intersection being Chase Road. As it headed northward, the route traveled along the western edge of Darke County Airport. The state route next arrived at its intersection with Plessinger Road. At this point, SR 242 turned east again, with the road heading north from this intersection becoming known as Shaffer Road. Running due east along the north side of the county airport, the route entered Wayne Township prior to arriving at its endpoint at its junction with SR 121, where the intersecting state highway forms the southern and eastern legs of the T-intersection.

== History ==
SR 242 was first designated in 1924 replacing what was then designated SR 199. The highway was assigned to the routing that it occupied throughout its entire nine-decade history. The entire route was asphalt-paved by 1939.

In 2012, the Darke County Airport proposed expanding its one runway 300 feet (91 m) to the west. With the expansion, the north–south segment of SR 242 would have to be removed. As one of the shortest state highways in the state, the Ohio Department of Transportation (ODOT) proposed abandoning the entire route with jurisdiction of the road being transferred to Darke County and the two townships through which the route traveled. Earlier proposals for the route included ODOT taking over the entire length of Chase Road (which runs along the southern edge of the airport) to SR 121. ODOT gave up control of the route in 2013 with the portion from US 127 to Horner Road becoming Darke County Route 242 and the remainder becoming maintained by Richland and Wayne Townships. For the maintenance of the road, ODOT also gave US$800,000 to the Darke County Engineer.

== Major intersections ==
The entire route was in Darke County.

Location	mi	km	Destinations	Notes
Richland Township	0.00	0.00	US 127 / Reed Road	
Wayne Township	3.67	5.91	SR 121	
1.000 mi = 1.609 km; 1.000 km = 0.621 mi
