= Ohio State Route 587 =

State highway in northwestern Ohio, US

State Route 587

Route information
- Maintained by ODOT
- Length: 12.53 mi (20.17 km)
- Existed: 1937–present

Major junctions
- South end: SR 53 / CR 35 in McCutchenville
- US 224 near New Riegel
- North end: SR 18 in Fostoria

Location
- Country: United States
- State: Ohio
- Counties: Wyandot, Seneca

Highway system
- Ohio State Highway System; Interstate; US; State; Scenic
← SR 586	→ SR 588

State Route 587 (SR 587) is a north–south state route in the northwestern quadrant of the U.S. state of Ohio. The highway's southern terminus is at SR 53 in the census-designated place of McCutchenville about 5 miles (8.0 km) southeast of New Riegel. Its northern terminus is at the Intersection with SR 18 in the southeastern corner of the city of Fostoria.

== Route description ==
SR 587 is located in the northern portion of Wyandot County and the southwestern quadrant of Seneca County. This highway is not included as a component of the National Highway System, a network of highways deemed most important for the country's economy, mobility and defense.

== History ==
SR 587 was designated a state route in 1937. The highway originally consisted of today's Wyandot County Road 35 from SR 67 approximately 2 miles (3.2 km) southwest of Sycamore to the intersection marking SR 587's southern terminus at SR 53 in McCutchenville and the entirety of the current SR 587. In 1965, the portion of SR 587 southeast of McCutchenville was removed from the state highway system. Jurisdiction of this stretch of roadway was transferred to Wyandot County, who then designated it as County Road 35.

== Major intersections ==
County	Location	mi	km	Destinations	Notes
Wyandot	Tymochtee Township	0.00	0.00	SR 53 (Clay Street) / CR 35 (Perry Street)	
Seneca	Loudon Township	8.40	13.52	US 224	
Seneca	Fostoria	12.53	20.17	SR 18 (Columbus Avenue)	
1.000 mi = 1.609 km; 1.000 km = 0.621 mi
