= Ohio State Route 378 =

State highway in Lawrence County, Ohio, US

State Route 378

Route information
- Maintained by ODOT
- Length: 9.46 mi (15.22 km)
- Existed: 1935–present

Major junctions
- South end: SR 243 in Union Township
- North end: SR 141 in Aid Township

Location
- Country: United States
- State: Ohio
- Counties: Lawrence

Highway system
- Ohio State Highway System; Interstate; US; State; Scenic
| ← SR 377 | → SR 379 |

State Route 378 (SR 378) is a north–south state highway in the south-central portion of Ohio. SR 378's southern terminus is at SR 243 about 5 miles (8.0 km) south of the unincorporated community of Willow Wood. Its northern terminus is at SR 141 nearly 4 miles (6.4 km) northwest of Willow Wood.

Created in the mid-1930s, and existing entirely in Lawrence County, SR 378 parallels Symmes Creek for its entire length. A part of the northern segment of the state highway runs through a small section of Wayne National Forest.

== Route description ==
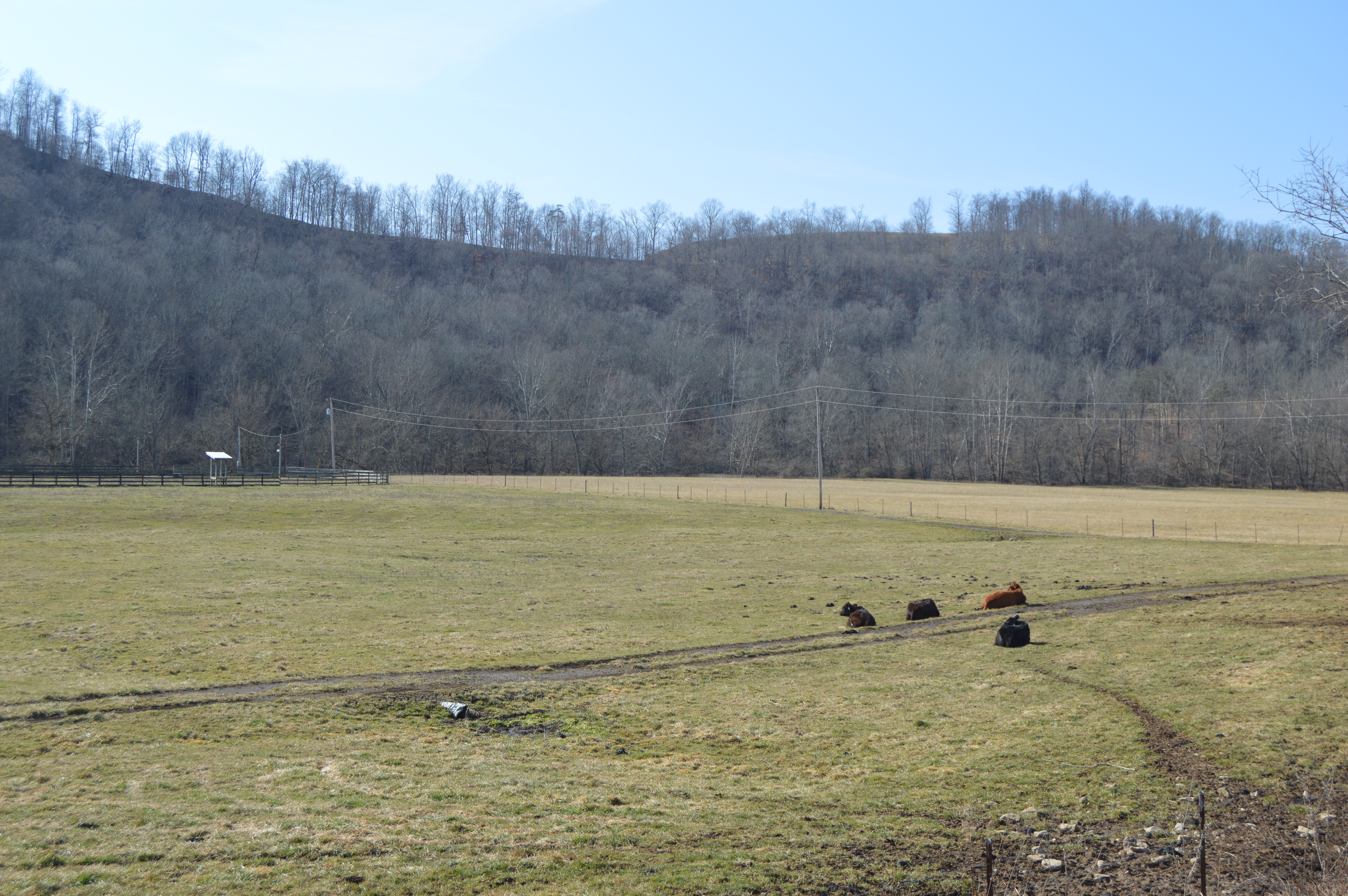
Fields just southwest of Aid; Symmes Creek flows in the distance

SR 378 begins at a four-way stop-controlled intersection in Union Township, within the unincorporated community of Getaway. SR 243 heads west and south from this intersection while the driveway to a vocational school travels east. SR 378 heads north through the Symmes Creek valley. The route leaves Union Township and enters Windsor Township. The route heads through an S-curve to stay near the creek as it continues north. Near the community of Willow Wood, SR 378 intersects and forms a concurrency with SR 217. The two routes wind their way west for about 0.6 miles (0.97 km) before SR 378 breaks off of the concurrency to continue heading north along the creek's path. Now heading in a more north-northwest direction for the remainder of the route, SR 378 is briefly within the boundaries of the Wayne National Forest. SR 378 enters Lawrence Township and then enters Aid Township before ending. Within the community of Aid, SR 378 ends at an intersection with SR 141.

For its entire length, SR 378's surroundings consists of residential homes and small farms within the Symmes Creek valley. Though the terrain in the area is very hilly, because the route closely winds its way along the bottom of the creek valley, the elevation along the route does not change very much. The highway is not included as a part of the National Highway System, a system of highways deemed most important for the country's economy, mobility and defense.

== History ==
When it was designated in 1935, SR 378 existed just in the form of its current northern 4 miles (6.4 km) segment between SR 217 and SR 141. Two years later, SR 378 would take on its current look when it was extended via a short concurrency with SR 217 heading east, then onto its current southern stretch to a junction with SR 243. Since that extension, there have been no other significant changes to the routing of State Route 378.

== Major intersections ==
The entire route is in Lawrence County.

| Location | mi | km | Destinations | Notes |
|---|---|---|---|---|
| Union Township | 0.00 | 0.00 | SR 243 | |
| Windsor Township | 4.95 | 7.97 | SR 217 east | Southern end of SR 217 concurrency |
| Windsor Township | 5.54 | 8.92 | SR 217 west | Northern end of SR 217 concurrency |
| Aid Township | 9.46 | 15.22 | SR 141 | |
1.000 mi = 1.609 km; 1.000 km = 0.621 mi: Concurrency terminus
