= Ohio State Route 326 (1930s) =

Former state highway in Lucas County, Ohio, US

State Route 326
- Perrysburg–Holland Road
- Routing of SR 326 in relation to modern roads

Route information
- Maintained by ODOT
- Length: 1.2 mi (1.9 km)
- Existed: 1932–1934

Major junctions
- South end: US 20N in Springfield Township
- North end: SR 2 in Springfield Township

Location
- Country: United States
- State: Ohio
- Counties: Lucas

Highway system
- Ohio State Highway System; Interstate; US; State; Scenic
← SR 325	→ SR 327
← US 223	→ US 224

State Route 326 (SR 326) was the final designation for a short state highway near Holland, Ohio. At the time the route was removed from the state highway system in 1934, the road had been a state highway since the system's creation but with different designations throughout its history.

== Route description ==
SR 326 began at an intersection with Holland–Sylvania Road. The route headed northwest for about one mile (1.6 km) until curving to the north, crossing over Wolf Creek, and ending at SR 2 which was also known as Toledo–Wauseon Road. The entire route was in Springfield Township, though the northern terminus was located just outside the village limits of Holland.

== History ==
The short stretch of road had been a part of the state highway system since at least 1912. Prior to 1922, the road was the northernmost mile of SR 57, a route that ran from Maumee to what was then SR 20 near Holland. From 1923 until 1926, the route became the westernmost mile of SR 102. In 1927, the mile-long roadway became the entirety of State Route 223 as the roads north and southeast of the southern terminus became a part of US 20. This designation would remain until 1931 when this route became State Route 283 as a result of the creation of U.S. Route 223 within the state (located in the northern part of Lucas County). This designation was short-lived as the route became State Route 326 by 1932 (the route at the southern terminus also became US 20N at this time). SR 326 would only be signed for about two years because in 1934, the route was removed from the state highway system altogether. Shortly after this route was removed, a different SR 326 was designated in Marietta, Washington County.

The road still exists today as a two-lane suburban road connecting the southwestern corner of Toledo with Holland. The road is now county-maintained as Lucas County Road 1571.

== Major intersections ==
The entire route was in Springfield Township, Lucas County.

mi	km	Destinations	Notes
0.0	0.0	US 20N (South Holland–Sylvania Road / Perrysburg–Holland Road)	
1.2	1.9	SR 2 (Toledo–Wauseon Road) / McCord Road	
1.000 mi = 1.609 km; 1.000 km = 0.621 mi
