= Ohio State Route 768 =

State highway in Knox County, Ohio, US

State Route 768

Route information
- Maintained by ODOT
- Length: 1.70 mi (2.74 km)
- Existed: 1946–present

Major junctions
- South end: US 36 in Mount Vernon
- North end: SR 3 near Mount Vernon

Location
- Country: United States
- State: Ohio
- Counties: Knox

Highway system
- Ohio State Highway System; Interstate; US; State; Scenic
← SR 767	→ SR 770

State Route 768 (SR 768) is a 1.7-mile (2.7 km) long north–south state highway in the central portion of the U.S. state of Ohio. The highway runs from its southern terminus at a signalized intersection with U.S. Route 36 (US 36) in the eastern portion of the city of Mount Vernon to its northern terminus at SR 3 approximately 1.25 miles (2.01 km) north of the Mount Vernon city limits.

Created in the middle of the 1940s, SR 768 is a two-lane route that serves as a connector route between US 36 and SR 3 in the northeastern portion of the Mount Vernon vicinity. For its entire length, State Route 768 is alternately known as Vernonview Drive.

== Route description ==
The entirety of SR 768 is located within the central part of Knox County. SR 768 is not a part of the National Highway System.

The highway commences at a signalized intersection with US 36 at the eastern end of Mount Vernon. Traveling north from there, while in within the city limits of Mount Vernon the highway passes through a primarily residential area, intersecting a few side streets along the way. As SR 768 exits the city and enters Monroe Township, it abuts the eastern side of Hiawatha Golf Course. Meanwhile, on the east side of the road there is a blend of woods and fields, with a couple of homes appearing amidst the blended landscape. Upon crossing the Avalon Road (County Road 72) intersection, SR 768 passes by the Mount Vernon Development Center, which appears on the east side of the highway. The remainder of the highway passes amidst a blend of forest, open fields and houses prior to arriving at its endpoint at SR 3.

== History ==
SR 768 was designated in 1946. It has always been routed along the US 36–SR 3 alignment as it follows today and has not experienced any major changes since it was established.

== Major intersections ==
The entire route is in Knox County.

Location	mi	km	Destinations	Notes
Mount Vernon	0.00	0.00	US 36 (Coshocton Avenue) / Vernonview Drive	Southern terminus at signalized intersection
Monroe Township	1.70	2.74	SR 3 (Wooster Road) / McKenzie Drive – Mount Vernon, Loudonville	Northern terminus
1.000 mi = 1.609 km; 1.000 km = 0.621 mi
