= McCutchenville, Ohio =

- Census-designated place
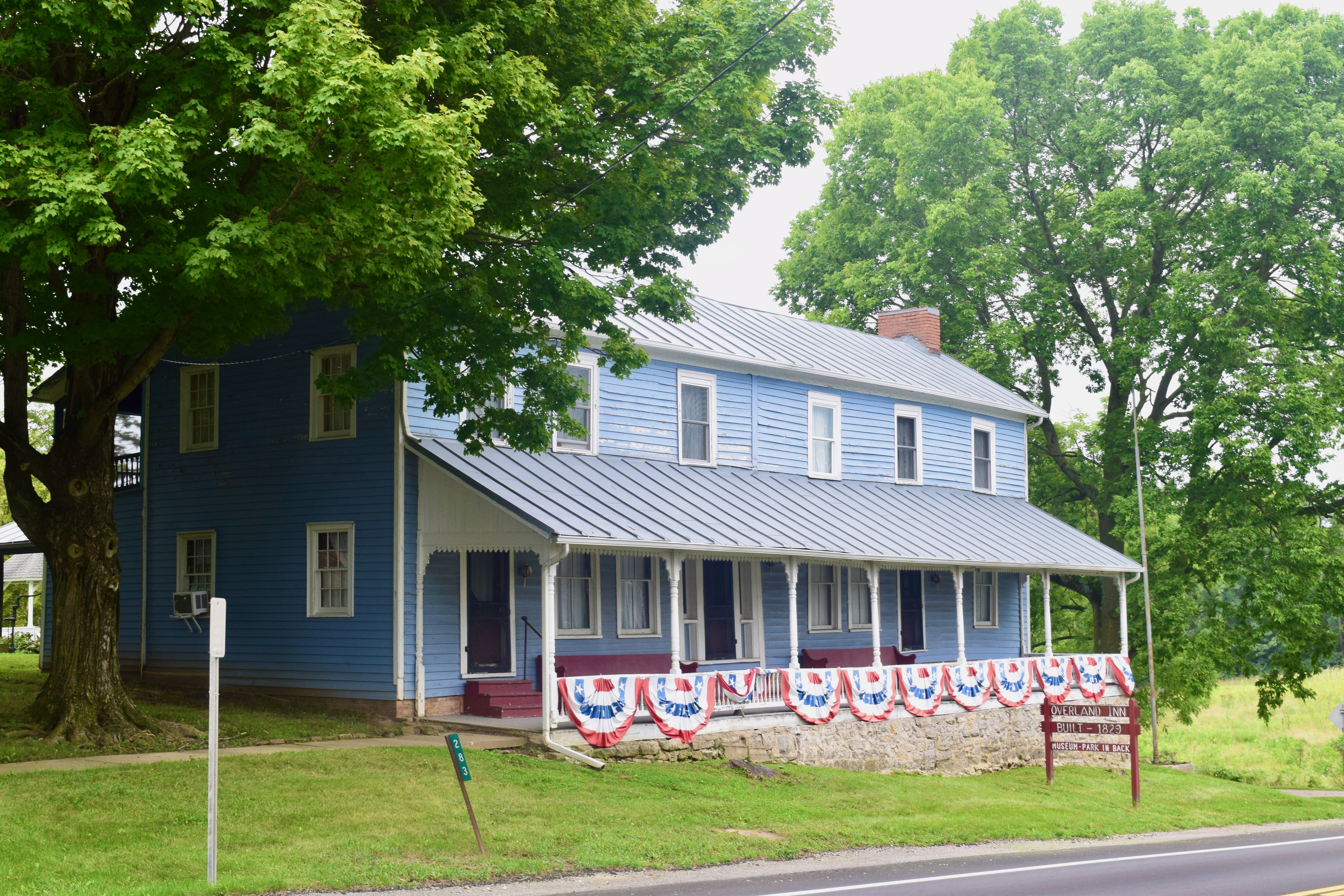
- The Overland Inn
- Nickname: Scutch
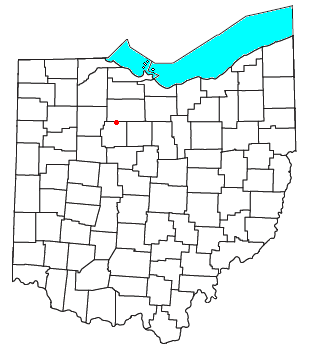
- Location of McCutchenville, Ohio
- Coordinates: 40°59′26″N 83°15′34″W
- Country: United States
- State: Ohio
- County: Wyandot
- Township: Tymochtee

Area
  - Total: 2.80 sq mi (7.24 km^{2})
  - Land: 2.78 sq mi (7.20 km^{2})
  - Water: 0.015 sq mi (0.04 km^{2})
- Elevation: 791 ft (241 m)

Population (2020)
  - Total: 371
  - Density: 133.4/sq mi (51.52/km^{2})
- Time zone: UTC-5 (Eastern (EST))
  - Summer (DST): UTC-4 (EDT)
- ZIP codes: 44844
- FIPS code: 39-45892
- GNIS feature ID: 2628929

McCutchenville is a census-designated place (CDP) in northern Wyandot and southern Seneca counties, Ohio, United States. It has a post office with the ZIP code 44844. It lies at the intersection of State Routes 53 and 587. The population was 371 at the 2020 census.

== History ==
McCutchenville was laid out in 1829. The community was named for Joseph McCutchen, the original owner of the town site. A post office has been in operation at McCutchenville since 1833. In 1829, Joseph McCuthchen built the McCutchen Overland Inn. The Inn served as a stagecoach stop on the Harrison Trail. Later, the Inn became a hotel and apartment building, before falling into disrepair. The structure that formerly housed the Inn was purchased by the Wyandot County Historical Society in 1964. Over the course of three years, the building was restored to its stagecoach days, and was soon dedicated as a stagecoach museum. It is one of only two original stagecoach inns remaining in the state.

== Demographics ==
Historical population
Census	Pop.	Note	%±
2020	371		—
U.S. Decennial Census
