= Ohio State Route 267 =

State highway in Columbiana County, Ohio, US

State Route 267

Route information
- Maintained by ODOT
- Length: 5.39 mi (8.67 km)
- Existed: 1927–present

Major junctions
- South end: SR 7 / SR 39 in East Liverpool
- North end: US 30 / SR 7 / SR 11 near Calcutta

Location
- Country: United States
- State: Ohio
- Counties: Columbiana

Highway system
- Ohio State Highway System; Interstate; US; State; Scenic
← SR 266	→ SR 268

State Route 267 (SR 267, OH 267) is a north–south state highway located in northeast Ohio, a U.S. state. Its southern terminus is at a signalized intersection with the duplex of State Route 7 and State Route 39 in downtown East Liverpool, amidst the interchange where State Route 7 and State Route 39 join the U.S. Route 30/State Route 11 freeway in opposing directions. The northern terminus of State Route 267 is at a diamond interchange with the U.S. Route 30/State Route 7/State Route 11 freeway near Calcutta, one where State Route 7 splits from U.S. Route 30/State Route 11 and takes over for State Route 267 heading north.

== Route description ==
State Route 267's entirety lies within the southeastern corner of Columbiana County. The highway is not a part of the National Highway System, a network of routes deemed most important for the nation's economy, mobility and defense.

== History ==
State Route 267 made its debut in 1927 along the southeastern Columbiana County alignment that it utilizes to this day. No changes of major significance have taken place to the route since its debut. A significant portion of SR 267 from its southern terminus in East Liverpool until just before the northern terminus is also part of the historic Lincoln Highway.

== Major intersections ==
The entire route is in Columbiana County.

Location	mi	km	Destinations	Notes
East Liverpool	0.00	0.00	SR 7 / SR 39 (West 8th Street)	
St. Clair Township	5.39	8.67	US 30 / SR 7 / SR 11 – Rogers, Lisbon, East Liverpool	Interchange
1.000 mi = 1.609 km; 1.000 km = 0.621 mi
