= Ohio State Route 554 =

State highway in Gallia County, Ohio, US

State Route 554

Route information
- Maintained by ODOT
- Length: 20.28 mi (32.64 km)
- Existed: 1937–present

Major junctions
- West end: SR 325 / CR 79 near Rio Grande
- East end: SR 7 in Cheshire

Location
- Country: United States
- State: Ohio
- Counties: Gallia

Highway system
- Ohio State Highway System; Interstate; US; State; Scenic
← SR 553	→ SR 555

State Route 554 (SR 554) is an east–west state highway located in the southeastern corner of Ohio, a U.S. state. The western terminus of State Route 554 is at State Route 325 about 1 mile (1.6 km) north of Rio Grande, and just 1 block north of the State Route 325 interchange off of U.S. Route 35. Its eastern terminus is at an intersection with State Route 7 in Cheshire, two blocks west of the Ohio River.

== Route description ==
The entirety of State Route 554 is contained within Gallia County. No portion of this state highway is included as a part of the National Highway System.

== History ==
State Route 554 was designated in 1937 along the routing through Gallia County that it currently occupies. No changes of major significance have taken place to this state highway since it was first certified.

== Major intersections ==
The entire route is in Gallia County.

Location	mi	km	Destinations	Notes
Raccoon Township	0.00	0.00	SR 325 / CR 79 (Buckeye Hills Road) – Rio Grande, Vinton	
Springfield Township	5.87	9.45	SR 850 south / Vale Road	Northern terminus of SR 850
Springfield Township	6.61	10.64	SR 160 – Wilkesville, Gallipolis	
Cheshire	20.28	32.64	SR 7	
1.000 mi = 1.609 km; 1.000 km = 0.621 mi
