= Ohio State Route 7 =

State highway in Ohio, US

State Route 7
- SR 7 highlighted in red

Route information
- Maintained by ODOT
- Length: 335.98 mi (540.71 km)
- Existed: 1912–present

Major junctions
- South end: US 52 near Chesapeake
- US 35 in Gallipolis; US 33 / SR 833 near Pomeroy; I-77 in Marietta; I-470 near Bellaire; I-70 / US 40 / US 250 in Bridgeport; US 22 in Steubenville; US 30 / SR 11 from E. Liverpool to Rogers; I-76 / Ohio Turnpike near Youngstown; I-80 near Hubbard; I-90 in Conneaut
- North end: SR 531 in Conneaut

Location
- Country: United States
- State: Ohio
- Counties: Lawrence, Gallia, Meigs, Athens, Washington, Monroe, Belmont, Jefferson, Columbiana, Mahoning, Trumbull, Ashtabula

Highway system
- Ohio State Highway System; Interstate; US; State; Scenic
← SR 6	→ SR 8

State Route 7 (SR 7), formerly known as Inter-county Highway 7 until 1921 and State Highway 7 in 1922, is a north–south state highway in the southern and eastern portions of the U.S. state of Ohio. At about 336 miles (541 km) in length, it is the longest state route in Ohio. Its southern terminus is an interchange with U.S. Route 52 (US 52) just west of Chesapeake. Its northern terminus also serves as the eastern terminus of SR 531 in Conneaut. The path of SR 7 stays within five miles (8.0 km) of the Ohio River (Ohio's border with West Virginia) for the southern portion, with the river being visible from much of the route. The road also remains within 10 miles (16 km) of the Pennsylvania state line for the northern portion. The highway is also parallel with West Virginia Route 2 for most of the route, seen from the Ohio River.

== Route description ==
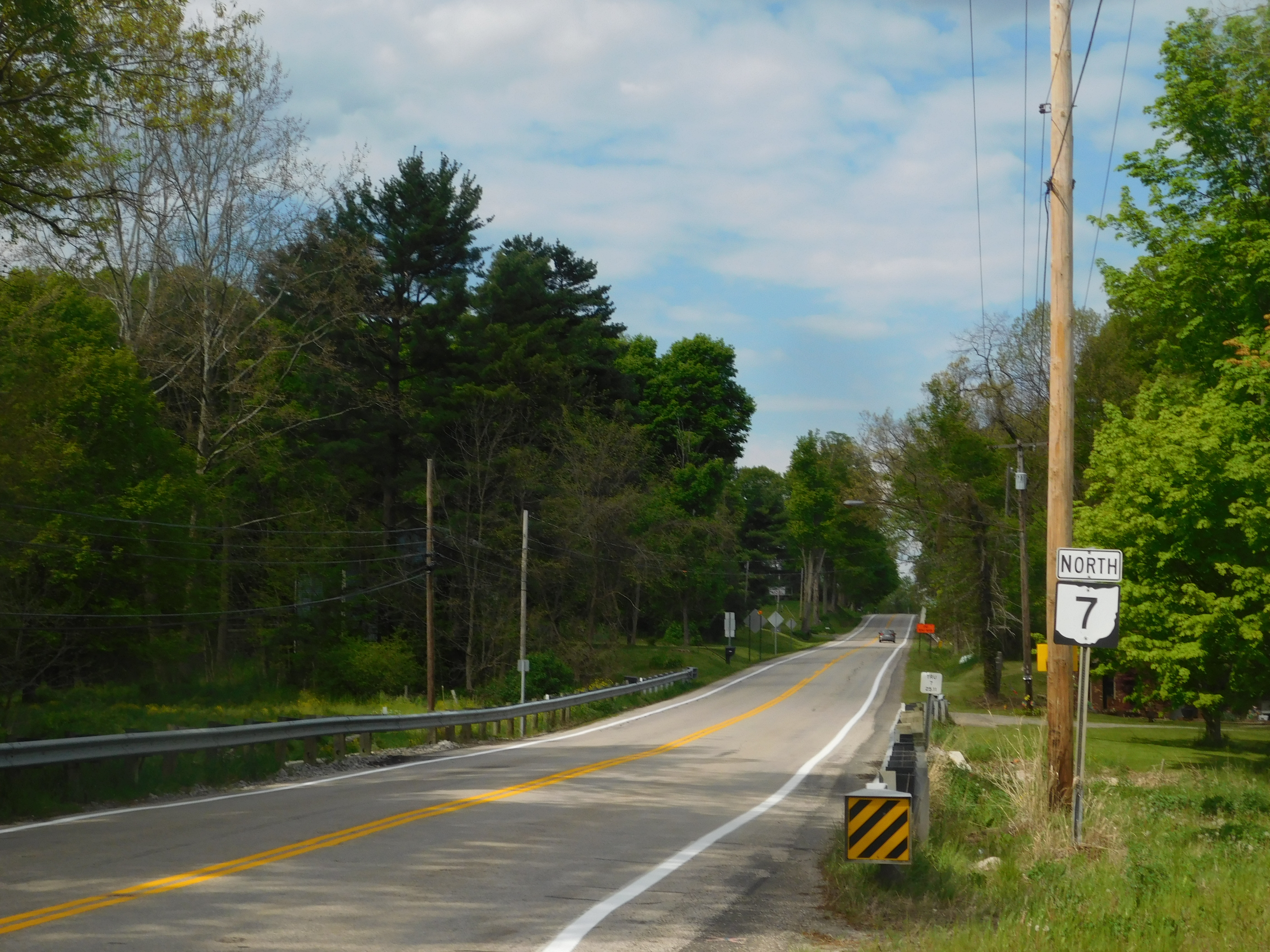
SR 7 north of SR 5 in Kinsman

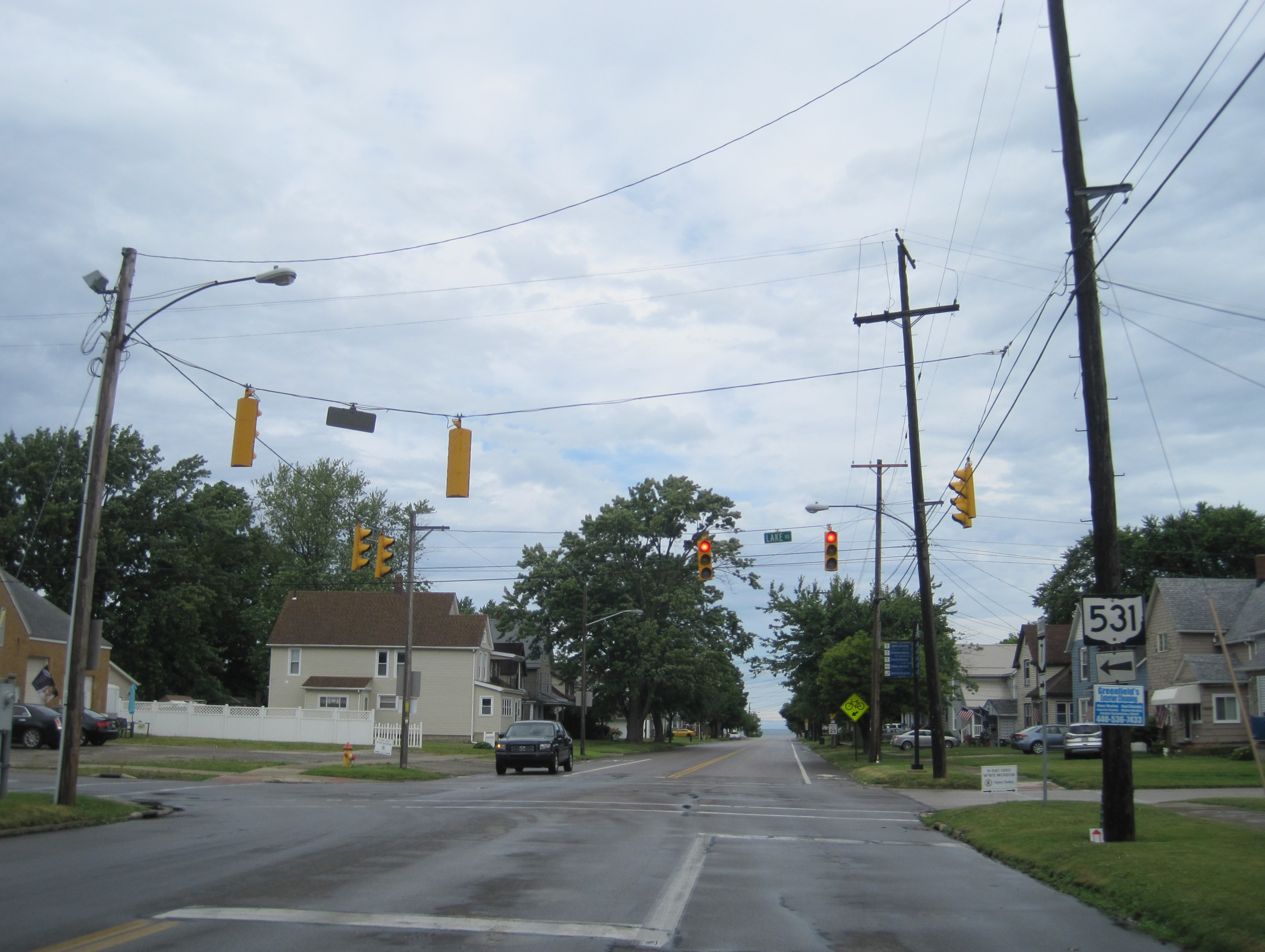
Northern terminus of SR 7 at SR 531 in Conneaut

SR 7 starts in Chesapeake and runs along the Ohio River for about 235 miles (378 km). This portion of the highway encounters routes like US 35, US 33, US 50, and Interstate 77 (I-77). It passes through many Ohio River towns like Marietta, Bellaire, and Steubenville. Once it reaches the Pennsylvania border it heads north along SR 11 & US 30 from East Liverpool to Rogers. After it exits State Route 11 in Rogers the route turns north and starts tracking toward Youngstown.

Upon reaching the junction with the Ohio Turnpike, OH SR 7 enters the Connecticut Western Reserve. Continuing north, it becomes Market Street in Boardman, Ohio, with a significant suburban increase. Then the highway heads east overlapped with US 62. At I-680, the routes travel along a freeway called the "Himrod Avenue Expressway". The freeway's junction with the US 422 freeway, the "Madison Avenue Expressway", features a modified partial cloverleaf interchange; one loop ramp is grade-separated over another, eliminating weaving. After the shared alignment with US 62, SR 7 then heads north again in Hubbard through many small towns to its northern terminus with SR 531 in Conneaut.

== History ==
In 1912, Intercounty Highway 7 ran along the Ohio River, from Elizabethtown to the Pennsylvania state line in East Liverpool.

In 1923, the route was at its greatest extent, the northern terminus of the route was extended from East Liverpool to Conneaut.

In 1927, the route's southern terminus was truncated from the Indiana state line to Chesapeake to make way for US 52 and a small segment of US 50

A tunnel was constructed north of Stratton in 1982. The $27 million project was necessitated for the expansion of the W. H. Sammis Power Plant.

=== Chesapeake and Proctorville bypass ===
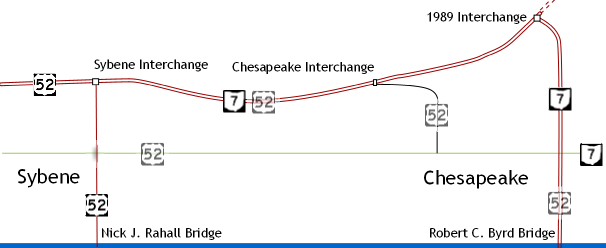
Historical map of the Chesapeake Bypass

The Chesapeake bypass was first proposed in 1953.

In 1961, the US 52 expressway opened from Chesapeake westward towards Sheridan. The original eastern terminus of the four-lane divided highway was at the current Chesapeake northbound-only exit ramp east of Tallow Ridge Road. US 52 originally crossed at the present-day Robert C. Byrd Bridge that connects Chesapeake to Huntington, West Virginia. In 1979, the US 52 designation moved to the Nick Joe Rahall II Bridge as tolls on that span were removed that year; the segment east of the Rahall Bridge to the Chesapeake interchange was renumbered to SR 7.

Ten years later, the four-lane expressway was extended eastward to an incomplete trumpet interchange just east of Big Branch Road. A four-lane connector route from the partially complete interchange to the foot of the Robert C. Byrd Bridge at SR 527 was completed. At the same time, the two-lane Chesapeake interchange ramp just east of Tallow Ridge Road was converted to a northbound-only exit ramp. The abrupt terminus at Chesapeake was envisioned to connect to Proctorville. Though the portion of SR 527 is signed as part of SR 7, it is not officially part of the route and many signs show this portion of SR 527 as "To SR 7."

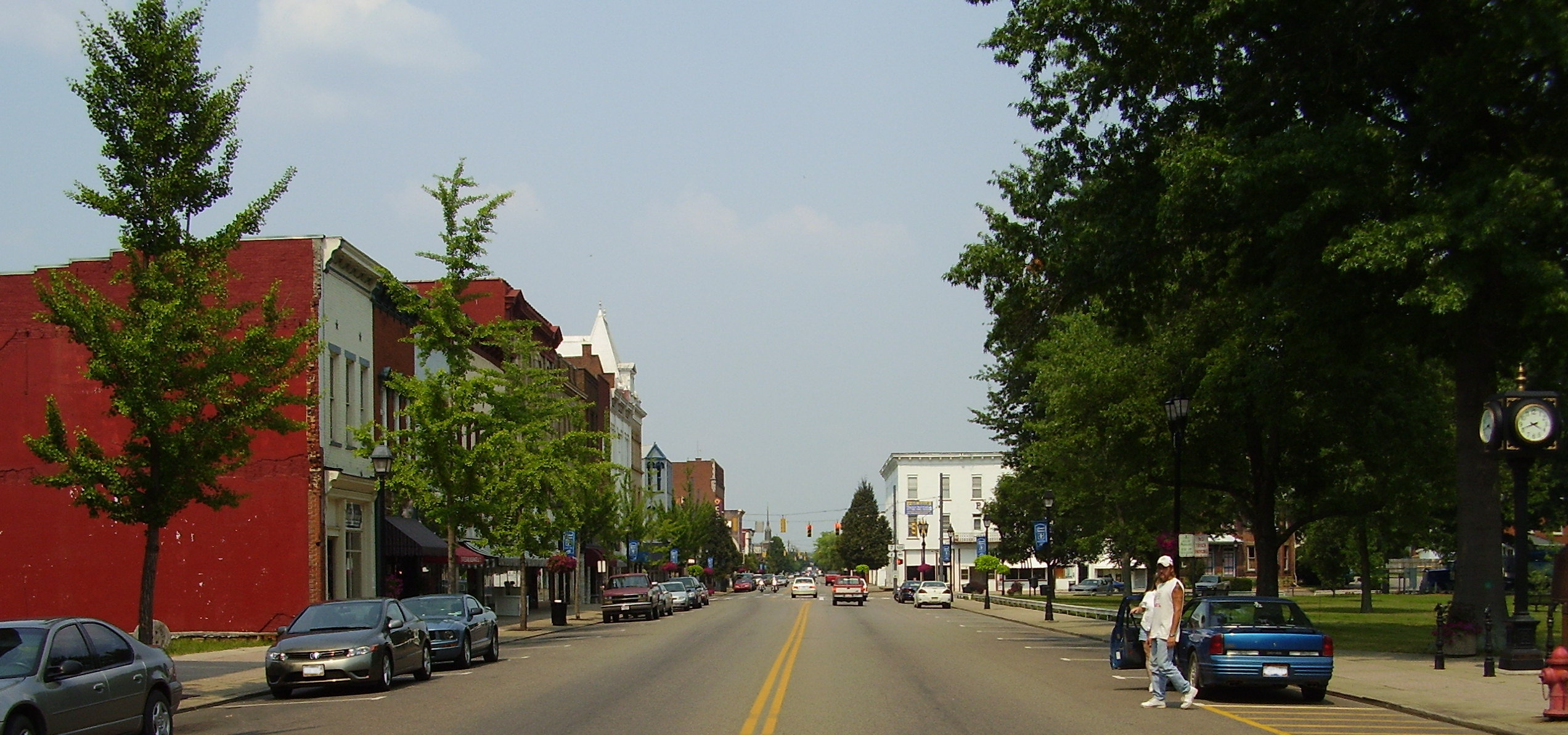
State Route 7 runs through downtown Gallipolis

On May 31, 2002, ground was broken for Phase 1-A of the Proctorville bypass. Phase 1-A entailed a two-lane connector road from the East Huntington Bridge to Irene Road, with the original loop ramp from the bridge to State Route 7 being modified into an access road. Phase 1-B was designated from Irene Road to State Route 7 near Fairland East Elementary in Rome Township. Phase 2 was envisioned from Irene Road west to Chesapeake. The total cost was originally estimated to be at $165 million.

On April 27, 2003, Phase 1-A of the Proctorville bypass opened to traffic. The $6.5 million, one-mile (1.6 km) section of three-lane roadway was opened from the foot of the East Huntington Bridge to Irene Road and signed as SR 607.

On June 3, 2003, bids were opened for Phase 1-B from Irene Road to SR 7 near Fairland East Elementary. The projected cost of the 4.5-mile (7.2 km) segment was originally $27 million, however, when the bids were let, the cost had decreased to $24.3 million. The lowest bid, which was also accepted, came in at $22.1 million. The road was designed as a two-lane limited-access facility on a four-lane right-of-way. Construction began on August 4, with an original estimated completion date of June 30, 2005.

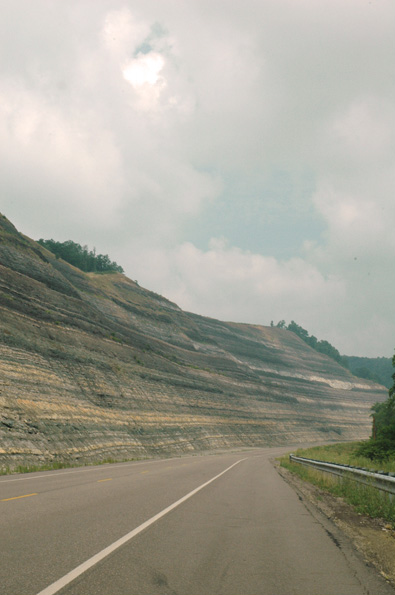
State Route 7 south of Dilles Bottom, Ohio

An unusual amount of rain, blamed on two hurricanes, caused major delays. More than one-dozen major slips along Phase 1-B required an additional $30 million in repairs and the purchase of additional land for highwall excavations. Another change was the design of the roadway; originally projected to be widened in the future when higher traffic counts warrant the expansion, it was designed on wide right-of-way with no grade separation between the opposing lanes. During the repair of the slips, a terraced roadway was constructed to separate the future southbound lanes from the northbound by a highwall when the roadway is expanded to four lanes.

Other cost overruns had pushed the cost of construction to $62 million total, which included Phases 1-A and 1-B, up from the original estimates of $32 million. The primary cause was rapidly increasing land values and "unchecked zoning" along the project's projected right-of-way along with geo-technical problems with rocky soil. Property values along the projected route, for instance, increased 91.5% from 1992 to 2001 alone.

In October 2006, a small 1/2-mile (0.80 km) segment of the Phase 1-B bypass opened to traffic between SR 607 and Irene Road intersection to SR 775. The remainder, east to SR 7 near Fairland East Elementary, opened on December 8, 2006. It includes intersections with SR 775, Kinley Avenue, and SR 7. Upon completion, phases 1-A and 1-B were signed as SR 7; the bypass from the SR 775 junction to the loop at the East Huntington Bridge was co-numbered with SR 775.

Phase 2 of the bypass, from the Chesapeake bypass to Irene Road at Proctorville, has not been funded. Funding which had been previously promised by the Ohio Department of Transportation (ODOT) was later denied. Phase 2 is estimated to cost $76 million to complete. Also due to the construction delays (slips) on the bypass from SR 775 to Fairland East Elementary School (Phase 1-B), the design of Phase 2 may be realigned to prevent slips during construction.

In December 2023 the State of Ohio approved funding of $126 Million for Phase 2. In 2024 ODOT released the detailed plans for Phase 2 and future Phase 3 and 4 (Eventual 4 lane limited access highway). Phase 2 will build a 2 lane road with additional truck climbing lanes in specific areas (see citation 23) from the Western Interchange in Chesapeake to just west of Proctorville where it will convert to 4 lanes at the Proctorville Interchange (full interchange). State Route 243 will terminate at a roundabout with the new State Route 7 near the junction of the current County Road 68 and State Route 243 between Chesapeake and Proctorville.

In the fall of 2024 tree clearing began in the project right of way with expected completion in the Spring of 2025 with construction expected to start during the Spring of 2025 and conclude in 2028.

=== Pomeroy Bypass ===
The Pomeroy bypass from Middleport east to US 33 was completed in 1968. At the time of completion, the bypass was two lanes but was widened to four lanes, divided, in 1976 from SR 143 to US 33 near Rock Springs. The bypass was extended east in 2000 from Rock Springs to a partial diamond interchange with SR 7 as a four-lane divided expressway. It was initially signed just SR 7. The diamond interchange was later completed with all connections, and the highway was extended eastward to Ravenswood, West Virginia as US 33.

== Major intersections ==
County	Location	mi	km	Exit	Destinations	Notes
Lawrence	Union Township	0.00– 0.32	0.00– 0.51	—	US 52 west (Ohio River Scenic Byway) – Ironton	Southern terminus of SR 7 and its ORSB concurrency; trumpet interchange
Lawrence	Union Township	0.00– 0.32	0.00– 0.51	—	US 52 east (West Huntington Bridge) to I-64 / US 60 – Huntington	
Lawrence	Union Township	1.40	2.25	—	Chesapeake	Northbound exit
Lawrence	Union Township	2.04– 2.30	3.28– 3.70	—	SR 527 south (Chesapeake Bypass) to SR 7 – Huntington W. Va.	Partial interchange: northbound exit; southbound entrance; also northbound entrance from Melody Lane
Lawrence				Gap in road, SR 527 signed as "To SR 7"		
Lawrence	Chesapeake	2.30	3.70		SR 527 to SR 7 south / US 52 / US 60 – Ironton, Huntington W. Va.	
Lawrence	Union Township	5.09	8.19		SR 243 east / CR 3	Western terminus of SR 243
Lawrence	Union Township	6.36	10.24		SR 775 south (East Huntington Bridge) – Huntington	Western end of SR 775 concurrency
Lawrence	Union Township	7.23	11.64		SR 775 north – Scottown	Eastern end of SR 775 concurrency
Lawrence	Rome Township	15.77	25.38		SR 217 west / State Street	Eastern terminus of SR 217
Gallia	Crown City	19.95	32.11		SR 553 north	Southern terminus of SR 553
Gallia	Gallipolis Township	38.44– 38.47	61.86– 61.91		SR 218 south – Platform	Northern terminus of SR 218
Gallia	Gallipolis	40.81	65.68		SR 141 west (Portsmouth Road) – Ironton	Eastern terminus of SR 141
Gallia	Gallipolis	41.54	66.85		SR 588 west (State Street)	Eastern terminus of SR 588
Gallia	Gallipolis	42.12	67.79		SR 160 north (Pine Street) – Jackson	Southern terminus of SR 160
Gallia	Gallipolis Township	45.10– 45.30	72.58– 72.90		US 35 east (Silver Memorial Bridge) – Charleston	Partial interchange; access to eastbound and from westbound US 35 only
Gallia	Addison Township	45.84	73.77		SR 735 west to US 35 – Chillicothe	Eastern terminus of SR 735; provides access to westbound and from eastbound US 35
Gallia	Cheshire	53.24	85.68		SR 554 west – Porter	Eastern terminus of SR 554
Meigs	Middleport	57.12	91.93		Ohio River Scenic Byway / Hobson Drive – Middleport	Northern end of ORSB concurrency; former routing of SR 7
Meigs	Salisbury Township	59.52	95.79		SR 124 west – Rutland, Jackson	Western end of SR 124 concurrency
Meigs	Salisbury Township	60.55	97.45		SR 143 north – Harrisonville	Southern terminus of SR 143
Meigs	Salisbury Township	62.84– 63.54	101.13– 102.26		US 33 west / SR 124 east / SR 833 west / CR 22 – Pomeroy, Athens	Western end of US 33 concurrency; eastern end of SR 124 concurrency; eastern terminus of SR 833; movements served by hybrid interchange from other routes onto SR 7: a partial diamond interchange with additional connecting road from northbound SR 7, additional directional ramp along westbound US 33, and additional large loop ramp onto northbound SR 7
Meigs	Salisbury Township	65.36– 66.02	105.19– 106.25		US 33 east to I-77 / SR 733 south – Ravenswood, Pomeroy	SR 7 exits at interchange; end of US 33 concurrency; northern terminus of SR 733
Meigs	Chester Township	69.60	112.01		SR 248 east / CR 25 (Pomeroy Pike) – Long Bottom, Reedsville	Western terminus of SR 248
Meigs	Orange Township	77.71	125.06		SR 681 – Reedsville, Darwin	
Athens	Troy Township	81.19– 81.62	130.66– 131.35		US 50 west / SR 32 west (James A. Rhodes Appalachian Highway) – Athens	Southern end of US 50 / SR 32 concurrencies; trumpet interchange
Athens	Coolville	82.72	133.12		SR 144 – Stewart, Hockingport	
Athens	Troy Township	85.72	137.95		SR 124 west (Ohio River Scenic Byway) / CR 61 – Hockingport	Eastern terminus of SR 124; southern end of ORSB concurrency
Washington	Belpre Township	89.57	144.15		SR 555 north – Bartlett	Southern terminus of SR 555
Washington	Belpre Township	90.37	145.44		SR 618 east – Belpre	Western terminus of SR 618; Partial interchange: northbound exit, southbound entrance
Washington	Belpre Township	91.34– 92.13	147.00– 148.27		SR 339 – Beverly	Hybrid diamond interchange, additional ramps provide access from northbound SR 7 and from SR 339 to US 50 interchange
Washington	Belpre Township	91.34– 92.78	147.00– 149.31		US 50 east (Blennerhassett Island Bridge) to I-77 – Parkersburg	Eastern end of US 50 concurrency; trumpet interchange
Washington	Belpre	96.33– 97.02	155.03– 156.14		SR 32 to SR 618 / Toll Bridge – Belpre, Parkersburg	End of SR 32 concurrency; hybrid split diamond interchange
Washington	Warren Township	107.11– 107.33	172.38– 172.73		SR 550 west / Virginia Street – Amesville, Barlow	Partial interchange: northbound exit, southbound entrance, other movements provided by connecting roads; eastern terminus of SR 550
Washington	Marietta	108.15	174.05		SR 676 west (Lancaster Street) – Watertown	Eastern terminus of SR 676
Washington	Marietta	108.78	175.06		SR 60 north (Third Street) / Washington Street – Beverly	Southern end of SR 60 concurrency
Washington	Marietta	109.81	176.72		SR 60 south (Williamstown Bridge) – Williamstown, WV	Northern end of SR 60 concurrency
Washington	Marietta	110.75	178.23		SR 26 north (Acme Street) – Washington State Community College	Southern terminus of SR 26
Washington	Marietta	110.79– 111.19	178.30– 178.94		I-77 – Parkersburg, Cleveland	I-77 exit 1
Washington	Newport Township	125.77– 125.82	202.41– 202.49		SR 807 north (Hi Carpenter Memorial Bridge) to WV 2 – St. Mary's W. Va.	Southern terminus of SR 807
Washington	Matamoras	138.66	223.15		SR 260 north (Broadway Street) – Bloomfield	Southern terminus of SR 260
Monroe	Jackson Township	143.05	230.22		SR 800 north – Woodsfield	Southern terminus of SR 800
Monroe	Jackson Township	143.16	230.39		Sistersville Ferry	To WV 18
Monroe	Lee Township	149.59	240.74		SR 255 west (Muskingum Street) – Laings	Eastern terminus of SR 255
Monroe	Ohio Township	153.54– 154.00	247.10– 247.84		SR 536 south (New Martinsville Bridge) – New Martinsville, West Virginia	Southern end of unsigned SR 536 concurrency
Monroe	Ohio Township	154.32	248.35		SR 536 north (Main Street)	Northern end of unsigned SR 536 concurrency; signed eastern terminus of SR 536
Monroe	Clarington	162.61	261.70		SR 78 west (Main Street) – Woodsfield	Eastern terminus of SR 78
Monroe	Clarington	163.15	262.56		SR 556 west – Beallsville	Eastern terminus of SR 556
Belmont	Powhatan Point	170.48	274.36		SR 148 – Barnesville	
Belmont	Powhatan Point	171.47	275.95		SR 148 (Main Street)	Eastern unsigned terminus of SR 148
Belmont	Mead Township	176.89	284.68	Southern end of Ohio River Scenic Byway (southern expressway section)		
Belmont	Mead Township	177.45– 177.83	285.58– 286.19	178	SR 872 east to WV 2 – Moundsville W. Va.	Diamond interchange; western terminus of SR 872
Belmont	Mead Township	180.86– 181.24	291.07– 291.68	181	Shadyside (Central Avenue)	Diamond interchange
Belmont	Pultney Township	183.24	294.90	183	Shadyside (Central Avenue)	Partial interchange: southbound exit, northbound entrance
Belmont	Bellaire	183.79– 184.10	295.78– 296.28	184	Pinch Run / Belmont Street (SR 147 west)	Diamond interchange; unsigned eastern terminus of SR 147
Belmont	Bellaire	184.86– 185.22	297.50– 298.08	—	SR 147 / SR 149 west (26th Street)	Diamond interchange; signed eastern terminus of SR 149
Belmont	Bellaire	186.31– 186.65	299.84– 300.38	187	48th Street / North Guernsey Street	Diamond interchange
Belmont	Pultney Township	187.50– 187.90	301.75– 302.40	188	I-470 – Steubenville, Ohio, Columbus	Inverted SPUI/continuous green T hybrid interchange, leading to a trumpet interchange at I-470 exit 6
Belmont	Bridgeport	189.11– 189.20	304.34– 304.49	189	To I-70 / US 40 / US 250 – Bridgeport, Wheeling	Partial interchange: northbound exit, southbound entrance (to unsigned SR 7A/SR 767), leads to I-70 exit 225
Belmont	Bridgeport	189.63	305.18	—	US 40 / US 250 to I-70 – Wheeling, Bridgeport	Partial interchange: southbound exit, northbound entrance, leads to I-70 exit 225
Belmont	Bridgeport	189.96	305.71	Northern end of Ohio River Scenic Byway (southern expressway section)		
Belmont	Martins Ferry	191.38	308.00		SR 647 north (Hanover Street)	Southern terminus of SR 647
Belmont	Martins Ferry	193.17	310.88	Southern end of Ohio River Scenic Byway (central expressway section)		
Belmont	Pease Township	194.54– 194.87	313.08– 313.61	—	Pattons Run / Picoma Road	Diamond interchange
Jefferson	Yorkville	195.95– 196.26	315.35– 315.85	—	Public Road – Yorkville	Diamond interchange
Jefferson	Tiltonsville	197.11– 197.45	317.22– 317.76	—	Farm Lane – Tiltonsville	Diamond interchange
Jefferson	Rayland	198.57– 198.71	319.57– 319.79	—	SR 150 – Rayland, Dillonvale	Interchange with two pairs of slip ramps
Jefferson	Wells Township	202.79	326.36	—	Salt Run Road / Riddles Run Road	Former routing of SR 7; partial interchange: northbound exit only
Jefferson	Wells Township	203.87– 204.26	328.10– 328.72	—	Brilliant / Riddles Run Road	Former routing of SR 7; diamond interchange
Jefferson	Brilliant	205.04– 206.58	329.98– 332.46	—	Brilliant	Partial interchange: southbound exit and entrance; northbound entrance
Jefferson	Steubenville Township	207.61– 208.07	334.12– 334.86	—	SR 151 west – New Alexandria, Smithfield	Diamond interchange; eastern terminus of SR 151
Jefferson	Steubenville Township	208.59– 208.77	335.69– 335.98	—	Commercial Avenue	Interchange: northbound slip ramps to Commercial Avenue, southbound ramps to Cool Spring Road
Jefferson	Steubenville Township	209.07– 209.10	336.47– 336.51	—	Murdock Avenue	Interchange with two right-in/right-outs
Jefferson	Steubenville Township	209.46– 210.00	337.09– 337.96	—	Logan Avenue	Diamond interchange
Jefferson	Steubenville	211.60	340.54	—	Lincoln Avenue	Partial interchange: northbound left exit, southbound entrance
Jefferson	Steubenville	211.89	341.00	Northern end of Ohio River Scenic Byway (central expressway section)		
Jefferson	Steubenville	212.49	341.97		SR 43 north (Washington Street) – Downtown	Southern terminus of SR 43
Jefferson	Steubenville	213.55	343.68		SR 822 west (University Boulevard) to US 22 east – Weirton, Pittsburgh	Eastern terminus of unsigned SR 822; former southern end of SR 822 concurrency; University Boulevard has ramp onto the Veterans Memorial Bridge
Jefferson	Steubenville	213.69	343.90		SR 822 east – Weirton, West Virginia	Closed; former routing of SR 822 across the now-demolished Fort Steuben Bridge; was inverted SPUI/continuous green T hybrid interchange
Jefferson	Steubenville	213.69– 213.93	343.90– 344.29		US 22 east (Veterans Memorial Bridge) / University Boulevard – Weirton, Pittsburgh	Partial interchange: no northbound exit; southern end of US 22 concurrency; southbound SR 7 continuation signed as exit 244A on US 22
Jefferson	Island Creek Township	214.84	345.75		US 22 west – Cadiz	Partial interchange: northbound exit, southbound entrance; northern end of US 22 concurrency; northbound SR 7 continuation signed as exit 242 on US 22
Jefferson	Island Creek Township	215.03	346.06		SR 213 north to US 22 west – Wintersville, Cadiz	Southern terminus of SR 213; roadway leads to ramps to and from westbound US 22
Jefferson	Island Creek Township	215.03	346.06	Southern end of Ohio River Scenic Byway (northern freeway section)		
Jefferson	Island Creek Township	215.59– 215.66	346.96– 347.07	—	CR 44 (Kingsdale Road) – Pottery Addition	Partial interchange: northbound exit, southbound entrance; former routing of SR 7
Jefferson	Island Creek Township	216.91– 216.97	349.08– 349.18	—	CR 44 (Kingsdale Road) – Pottery Addition	Partial interchange: southbound exit, northbound entrance; former routing of SR 7
Jefferson	Island Creek Township	218.25– 218.47	351.24– 351.59	—	CR 56 – Costonia	Diamond interchange
Jefferson	Toronto	219.89– 220.29	353.88– 354.52	—	Franklin Street	Diamond interchange
Jefferson	Toronto	221.82– 222.17	356.98– 357.55	—	4th Street	Diamond interchange
Jefferson	Empire	224.28– 224.80	360.94– 361.78	—	SR 152 south – Empire, Richmond	Hybrid diamond interchange; northern terminus of SR 152
Jefferson	Empire	225.07	362.22	Northern end of Ohio River Scenic Byway (northern freeway section)		
Jefferson	Saline Township	229.63	369.55		SR 213 south – Hammondsville	Northern terminus of SR 213
Columbiana	Wellsville	230.90– 231.37	371.60– 372.35	—	Clark Avenue – Wellsville	Hybrid diamond interchange
Columbiana	Wellsville	232.15	373.61	—	SR 39 west / Aten Avenue – Salineville	Diamond interchange; southern end of SR 39 concurrency
Columbiana	Wellsville	232.89– 233.69	374.80– 376.09	—	SR 45 / Third Street – Wellsville, Lisbon	Hybrid split diamond interchange; southern terminus of SR 45
Columbiana	East Liverpool	236.32– 236.85	380.32– 381.17		US 30 east / SR 11 south / SR 39 east / Webber Way – Pittsburgh, KSU Campus; SR 267 (Lisbon Road)	Hybrid non-free-flow interchange; northern end of SR 39 concurrency; northern end of ORSB concurrency; southern end of US 30/SR 11 concurrency; southern terminus of SR 267; no access to SR 267 from southbound SR 7
Columbiana	St. Clair Township	239.42– 240.01	385.31– 386.26	242	SR 170 north – Calcutta, East Palestine	Hybrid diamond interchange; southern terminus of SR 170
Columbiana	Madison Township	242.29– 242.47	389.93– 390.22		US 30 west / SR 11 north – Lisbon SR 267 south – Columbiana County Airport	SR 7 exits at diamond interchange; northern end of US 30/SR 11 concurrency; northern terminus of SR 267
Columbiana	Rogers	250.51	403.16		SR 154 (Walnut Street) – Lisbon, Negley	
Columbiana	Fairfield Township	252.74	406.75		SR 517 west / SR 558 – East Palestine, Lisbon	Eastern terminus of SR 517
Columbiana	Fairfield Township	255.79	411.65		SR 46 south / CR 422 (Columbiana-Waterford Road) – New Waterford	Southern end of SR 46 concurrency
Columbiana	Columbiana	257.31	414.10		SR 14 / SR 46 north – Columbiana, to Penn Route 51	Northern end of SR 46 concurrency
Mahoning	Beaver Township	261.50	420.84		SR 165 (South Range)	
Mahoning	Beaver Township	261.80	421.33		SR 164 (South Avenue) – Columbiana	
Mahoning	Beaver Township	262.89– 263.17	423.08– 423.53		I-76 / Ohio Turnpike – Toledo, Pittsburgh	I-76 exit 232; trumpet interchange to trumpet interchange
Mahoning	Beaver Township	264.44	425.57		SR 626 south	Northern terminus of SR 626
Mahoning	Boardman Township	267.07	429.81		US 224 (Boardman-Canfield Road / Boardman-Poland Road) – Canfield, Poland	
Mahoning	Youngstown	269.61	433.90		SR 170 (Midlothian Boulevard)	
Mahoning	Youngstown	270.47	435.28		US 62 west (Indianola Avenue)	Southern end of US 62 concurrency
Mahoning	Youngstown	271.75	437.34	—	Heasley Street	Southern end of southbound freeway
Mahoning	Youngstown	272.37	438.34	—	South Street	Southern end of northbound freeway
Mahoning	Youngstown	272.45	438.47	—	I-680 – Cleveland, Akron, Poland, Pittsburgh	Partial interchange: access from southbound US 62/SR 7 to I-680 and from I-680 to northbound US 62/SR 7 only; I-680 exit 6
Mahoning	Youngstown	272.92	439.22	—	SR 289 to US 422 east / Wilson Avenue / Himrod Avenue	Partial interchange: northbound exit, southbound entrance only
Mahoning	Youngstown	273.30– 273.70	439.83– 440.48	—	US 422 west – Warren	Modified partial cloverleaf interchange
Mahoning	Youngstown	273.83	440.69	Northern end of freeway		
Mahoning	Youngstown	273.83	440.69		To US 422 east / Albert Street	
Trumbull	Hubbard	278.64	448.43		SR 304 west (West Liberty Street)	Southern end of SR 304 concurrency
Trumbull	Hubbard	279.44	449.72		SR 304 east (East Liberty Street) SR 616 south (South Main Street)	Northern end of SR 304 concurrency; northern terminus of SR 616
Trumbull	Hubbard Township	280.65– 280.91	451.66– 452.08		I-80 / Hubbard Masury Road / Truck World Boulevard – Toledo, New York City	I-80 exit 234
Trumbull	Hubbard Township	281.47	452.98		US 62 north – Sharon, PA, Hermitage, PA	Northern end of US 62 concurrency
Trumbull	Brookfield Township	284.45	457.78		SR 82 – Sharon, PA, Warren	
Trumbull	Hartford Township	290.15– 290.23	466.95– 467.08		SR 305 – Cortland	
Trumbull	Hartford Township	291.87	469.72		SR 609 east – Orangeville	Western terminus of SR 609
Trumbull	Vernon Township	295.36– 295.40	475.34– 475.40		SR 88 – West Farmington, Greenville, PA	
Trumbull	Kinsman Township	299.35	481.76		SR 5 west – Warren	Southern end of SR 5 concurrency
Trumbull	Kinsman Township	300.55	483.69		SR 87 west – Middlefield	Eastern terminus of SR 87
Trumbull	Kinsman Township	300.91	484.27		SR 5 east – Jamestown, PA	Northern end of SR 5 concurrency
Ashtabula	Williamsfield Township	306.03	492.51		US 322 – Orwell, Jamestown, PA	
Ashtabula	Andover	311.10– 311.22	500.67– 500.86		US 6 west (West Main Street) SR 85 east (East Main Street)	Southern end of US 6 concurrency; western terminus of SR 85
Ashtabula	Richmond–Pierpont township line	318.61	512.75		US 6 east / North Richmond Road – Conneaut Lake, PA, Meadville, PA	Northern end of US 6 concurrency
Ashtabula	Pierpont Township	321.17	516.87		SR 167 west / Winship Avenue – Jefferson	Southern end of SR 167 concurrency
Ashtabula	Pierpont Township	322.08	518.34		SR 167 east / Cane Road – Conneautville	Northern end of SR 167 concurrency
Ashtabula	Monroe Township	328.85	529.23		SR 84 (Bushnell Road) – Ashtabula, Albion, PA	
Ashtabula	Conneaut	332.48– 332.68	535.07– 535.40		I-90 – Cleveland, Erie, PA	I-90 exit 241
Ashtabula	Conneaut	334.54	538.39		US 20 west (State Street) / Mill Street	Southern end of US 20 concurrency
Ashtabula	Conneaut	334.76	538.74		US 20 east (State Street) / Broad Street / LECT	Northern end of US 20 concurrency; southern end of LECT concurrency
Ashtabula	Conneaut	335.98	540.71		SR 531 (Lake Road) / LECT / Broad Street	Eastern terminus of SR 531; northern end of LECT concurrency
1.000 mi = 1.609 km; 1.000 km = 0.621 mi: Closed/former; Concurrency terminus; Incomplete access; Tolled

== Auxiliary routes ==
=== State Route 7 Alternate in Bridgeport ===
State Route 7 Alternate
- Location: Bridgeport
- Length: 0.72 mi (1,160 m)

Route of SR 7A in Bridgeport highlighted in red

State Route 7 Alternate (SR 7A) is a short 0.72-mile-long (1.16 km) connecting loop signed as SR 7 that serves as a link from SR 7, US 40, and US 250 to I-70 in Bridgeport. Its western (southern) terminus is at SR 767, and its eastern (northern) terminus is along US 40 at its intersection with US 250 and the northern terminus of SR 767. SR 7A begins at the intersections of Howard Street and SR 767 (South Lincoln Avenue). SR 7A continues west as Howard Street until it intersects Marion Street. It then runs north as Marion Street, intersects I-70, and then intersects US 40, Main Street. SR 7A continues east on US 40 until it ends at US 250 and SR 767, just 370 feet (110 m) west of the West Virginia state line.

The entire route is in Bridgeport, Belmont County.

mi	km	Destinations	Notes
0.00	0.00	SR 767 (South Lincoln Avenue) to SR 7 south	Interchange with SR 7
0.37– 0.42	0.60– 0.68	I-70 – Wheeling, WV, Columbus	Exit 225 (I-70)
0.46	0.74	US 40 west (Main Street)	Western end of US 40 concurrency
0.72	1.16	US 40 east / US 250 (Main Street) to SR 7 north / SR 767 south (South Lincoln Avenue)	Eastern end of US 40 concurrency; northern terminus of SR 767
1.000 mi = 1.609 km; 1.000 km = 0.621 mi: Concurrency terminus

=== State Route 767 ===
State Route 767
- Location: Bridgeport
- Length: 0.30 mi (480 m)

State Route 767 (SR 767) is an unsigned north–south state highway in the eastern portion of the U.S. state of Ohio. Currently, it is signed as an alternate route of SR 7. Its southern terminus is at an exit ramp on SR 7 in Bridgeport. The route serves as a connector from northbound SR 7 to SR 7 Alternate, US 40, and US 250. The route's northern terminus is where these U.S. routes overlap eastbound to cross the Ohio River into West Virginia. SR 7A serves as a connector for all of these routes to I-70.

=== Business State Route 7 from Middleport to Pomeroy ===
State Route 7 Business
- Location: Middleport-Pomeroy
- Existed: 2014

Business State Route 7 stretched from 1 3/4 miles (2.8 km) west of Middleport to about 4 miles (6.4 km) east of Pomeroy. The route followed the former alignment of State Route 7 that was replaced by the Pomeroy Bypass, and ran through the downtown areas of Middleport and Pomeroy. It joined with State Route 833 (the former alignment of U.S. Route 33) from one mile (1.6 km) west of Pomeroy to 1 3/4 miles (2.8 km) east of Pomeroy, including a brief concurrency with State Route 124, and then headed northeast to the eastern U.S. Route 33/State Route 7 interchange. The route was deleted between 2013 and 2015.

=== Route 7T ===
State Route 7T
- Location: Youngstown
- Length: 0.36 mi (580 m)
- Existed: 2007

State Route 7T (SR 7T) was a 0.36-mile-long (0.58 km) future route beginning at US 62 in Youngstown. The entire route was concurrent with US 62T. SR 7T and US 62T were removed on May 2, 2007.
