= Porter, Ohio =

Unincorporated community in Ohio, U.S.

Coordinates: 38°55′42″N 82°16′57″W

Porter is an unincorporated community in Gallia County, in the U.S. state of Ohio.

== History ==
Porter was platted in 1830. A variant name was Pine Grove. A post office called Porter was established in 1834, the name was changed to Porter in 1923, and the post office closed in 1959.
