= Rodney, Ohio =

Unincorporated community in Ohio, U.S.

Coordinates: 38°50′57″N 82°18′15″W

Rodney is an unincorporated community in Gallia County, in the U.S. state of Ohio.

== History ==
Rodney was platted in 1830. A post office called Rodney was in operation from 1839 until 1985.
