= East Huntington Bridge =

Frank Gatski Memorial Bridge
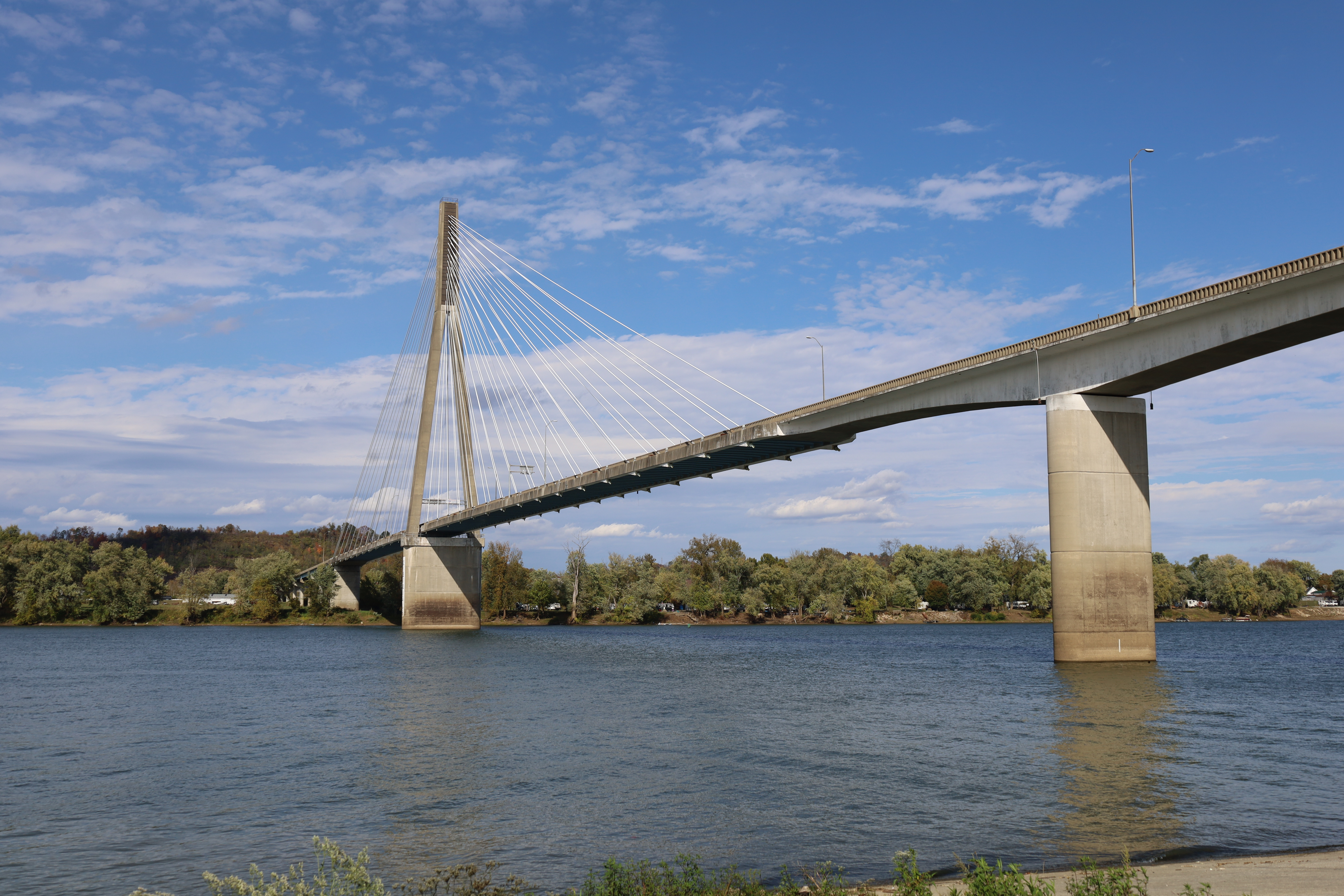
- The bridge in 2023
- Coordinates: 38°26′01″N 82°23′23″W
- Carries: 2 lanes of WV 106 / SR 775
- Crosses: Ohio River
- Locale: Huntington, West Virginia and Proctorville, Ohio
- Official name: Frank Gatski Memorial Bridge
- Other name(s): East Huntington Bridge, East End Bridge, 31st St Bridge
- Maintained by: West Virginia Department of Transportation

Characteristics
- Design: Cable-stayed bridge
- Width: 40.0 ft (12.20 m)
- Longest span: 900.0 ft (274.32 m)

History
- Opened: August 1985

Location
- Interactive map of Frank Gatski Memorial Bridge

The East Huntington Bridge (officially the Frank Gatski Memorial Bridge, also called the East End Bridge or the 31st Street Bridge) is a 900-foot (270 m) cable-stayed bridge crossing the Ohio River at Huntington, West Virginia. It carries West Virginia Route 106 on the West Virginia approach and OH 775 on the Ohio approach.

The northern approach (from Ohio State Route 7) is the recently extended Ohio State Route 775; its southern terminus is a pair of ramps (northbound on-ramp from Fifth Avenue, southbound offramp to Third Avenue) connecting it to U.S. Route 60.

== History ==
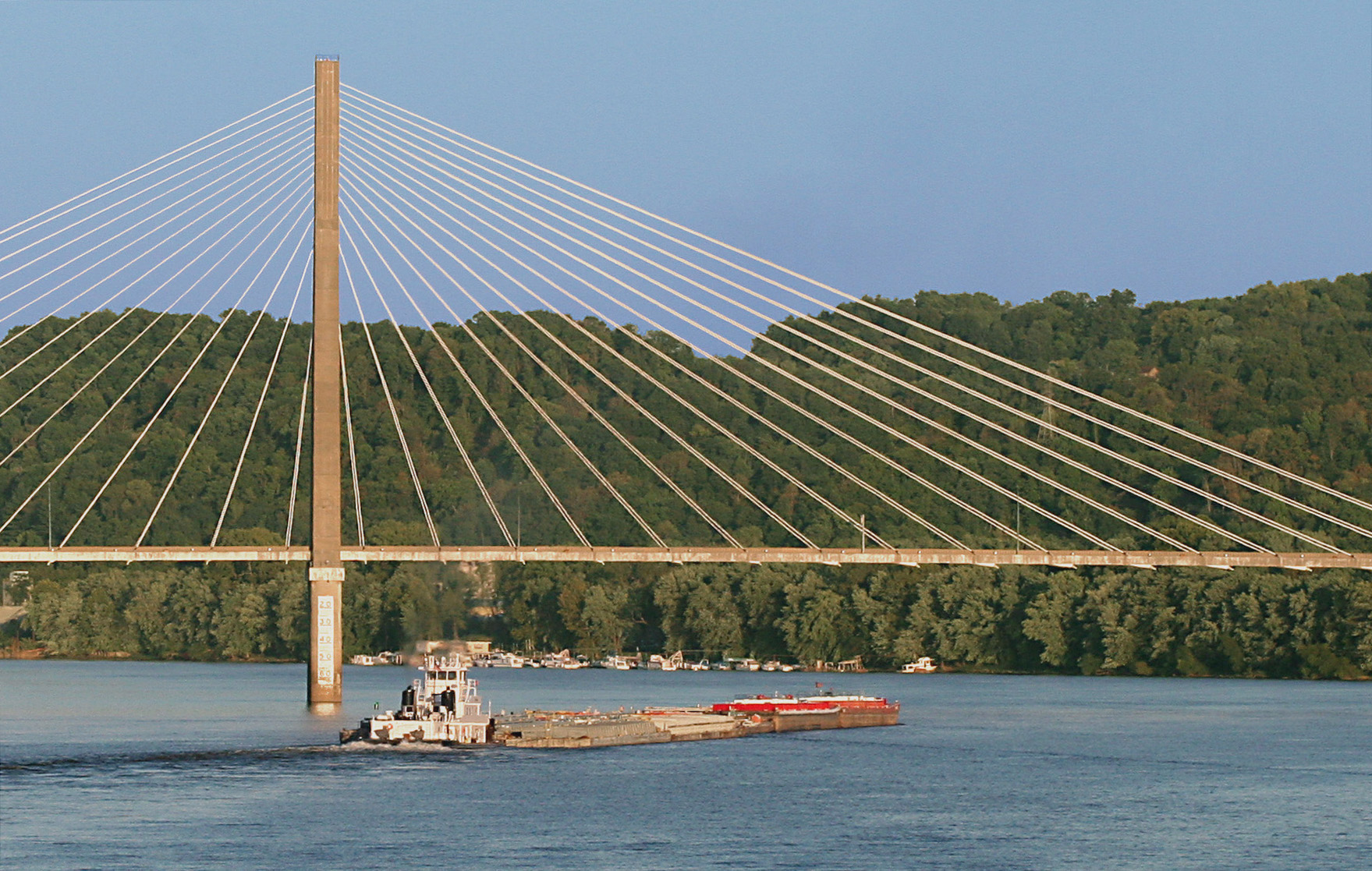
The bridge in 2007

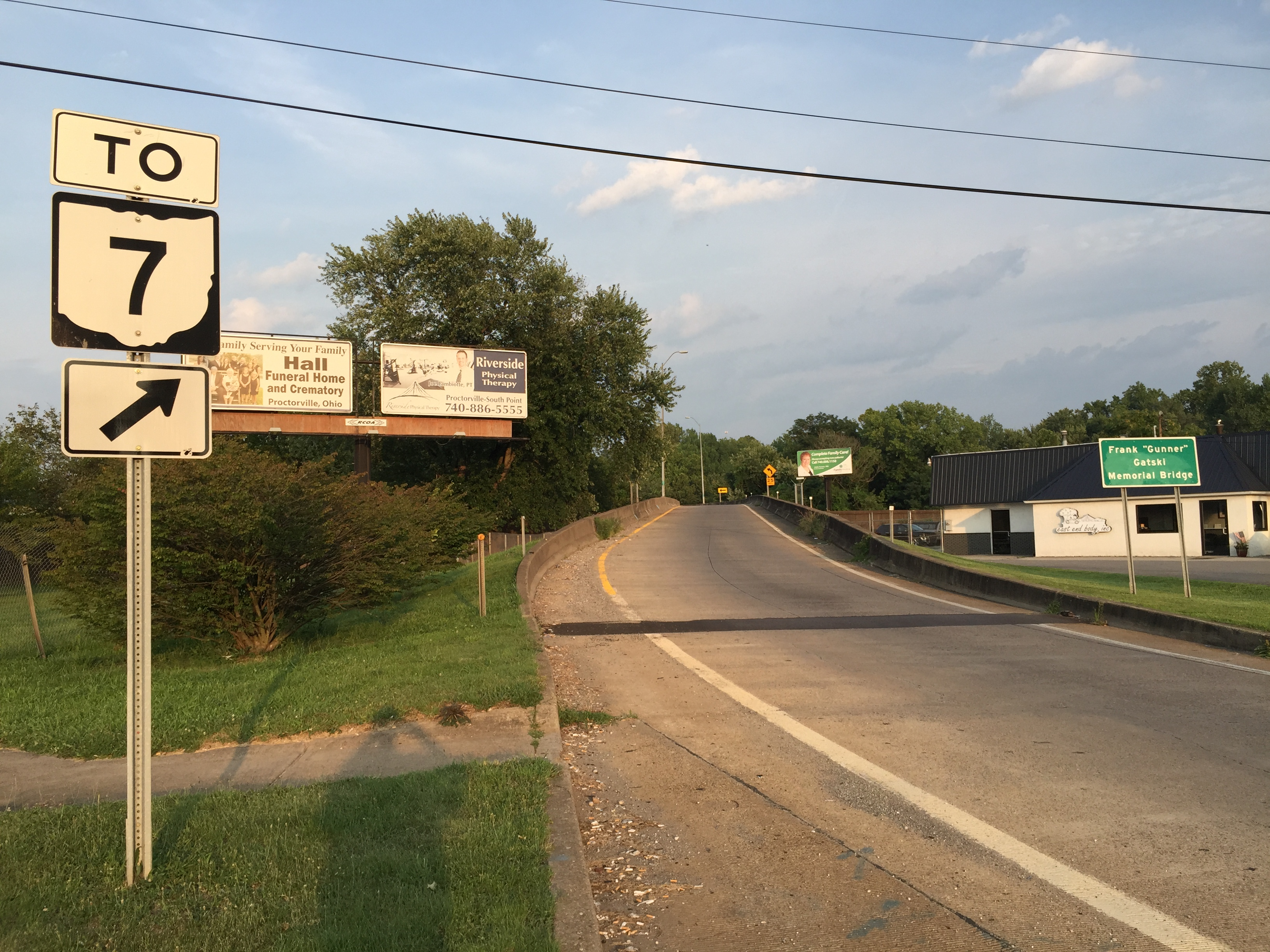
View north from the southern end of WV 106 at US 60 in Huntington

The history of the span dates to the early 1970s when possible routings for a future Ohio River span were being discussed. To conform to the Huntington city comprehensive plan, the alignment preferred by the city was one that connected to Interstate 64 outside of the city boundaries. Many favored a plan about one mile north of the city along WV 2.

Work began on the bridge in 1983 and was completed in August 1985 at a cost of $38 million. The designer of the bridge was Arvid Grant and Associated of Olympia, Washington and was the first bridge of its type in West Virginia. It was only the second of its kind in the United States since it utilized concrete instead of steel for its construction. It was built as a FHWA demonstration project.

The Ohio River span and approach ramps on both sides of the river completed was what was known as Phase I. Future plans involved tolling the bridge and connecting it to U.S. Route 60 four blocks east.

The bridge was renamed for Marshall University's first member of the Pro Football Hall of Fame, Frank "Gunner" Gatski, during halftime of the Marshall-UTEP Football game on November 18, 2006.

== See also ==
- List of crossings of the Ohio River
- Transportation in Huntington, West Virginia
