= Athalia, Ohio =

- Village
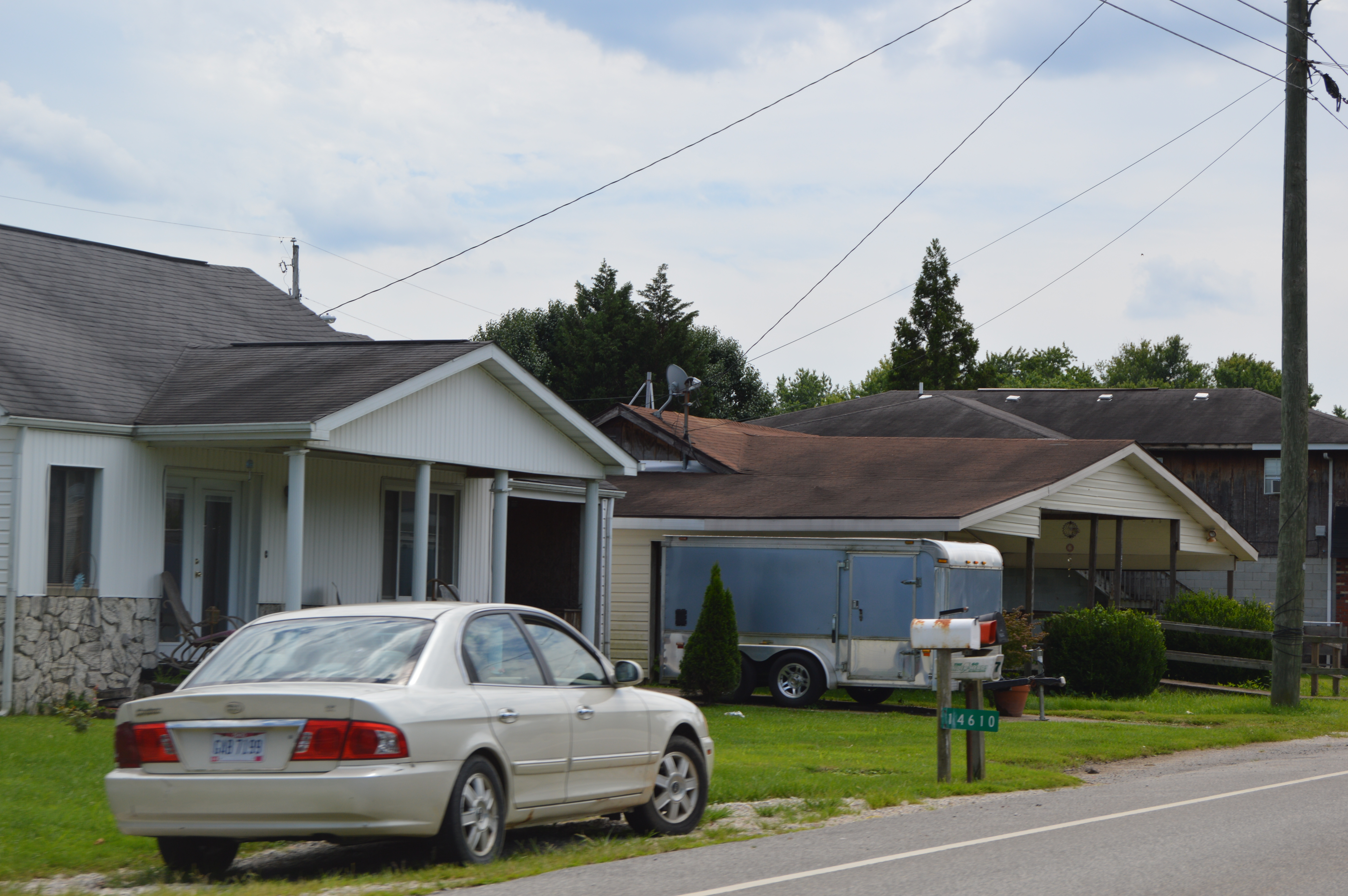
- Houses on Market Street

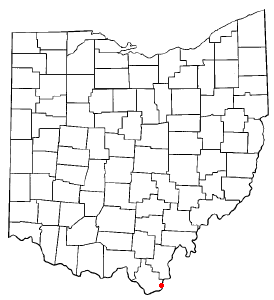
- Location of Athalia, Ohio

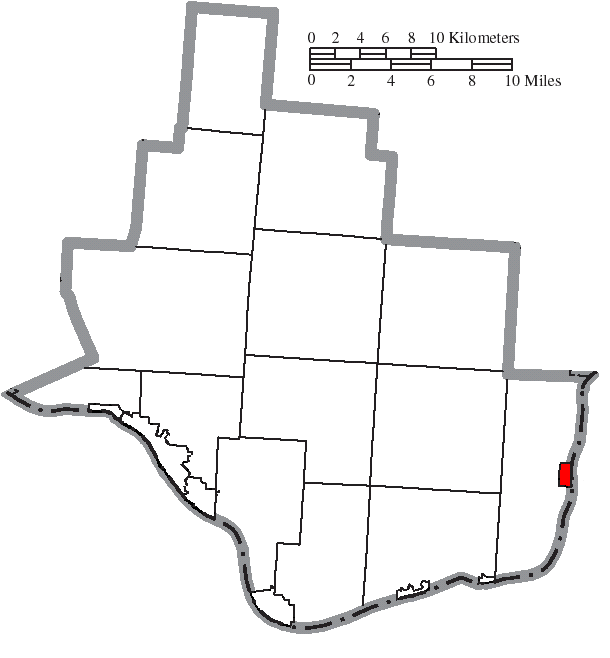
- Location of Athalia in Lawrence County
- Coordinates: 38°30′46″N 82°18′34″W
- Country: United States
- State: Ohio
- County: Lawrence
- Township: Rome

Government
  - Mayor: William B. Ward

Area
  - Total: 0.69 sq mi (1.78 km^{2})
  - Land: 0.69 sq mi (1.78 km^{2})
  - Water: 0 sq mi (0.00 km^{2})
- Elevation: 558 ft (170 m)

Population (2020)
  - Total: 279
  - Estimate (2024): 269
  - Density: 406.9/sq mi (157.12/km^{2})
- Time zone: UTC-5 (Eastern (EST))
  - Summer (DST): UTC-4 (EDT)
- FIPS code: 39-02722
- GNIS feature ID: 2398003

Athalia is a village in Lawrence County, Ohio, United States, along the Ohio River. The population was 279 at the 2020 census.

Athalia is a part of the Huntington-Ashland, WV-KY-OH, Metropolitan Statistical Area (MSA).

According to tradition, Athalia was named after the daughter of a first settler.

== Geography ==
According to the United States Census Bureau, the village has a total area of 0.69 square miles (1.79 km^{2}), all land.

== Demographics ==
Historical population
Census	Pop.	Note	%±
1880	251		—
1890	199		−20.7%
1900	346		73.9%
1910	226		−34.7%
1920	233		3.1%
1930	205		−12.0%
1940	263		28.3%
1950	307		16.7%
1960	341		11.1%
1970	287		−15.8%
1980	367		27.9%
1990	346		−5.7%
2000	328		−5.2%
2010	373		13.7%
2020	279		−25.2%
2024 (est.)	269	▼	−3.6%
U.S. Decennial Census

=== 2010 census ===
As of the census of 2010, there were 373 people, 152 households, and 101 families living in the village. The population density was 540.6 inhabitants per square mile (208.7/km^{2}). There were 163 housing units at an average density of 236.2 per square mile (91.2/km^{2}). The racial makeup of the village was 97.9% White, 0.8% African American, 0.8% Native American, 0.3% Asian, and 0.3% from two or more races. Hispanic or Latino of any race were 2.1% of the population.

There were 152 households, of which 28.9% had children under the age of 18 living with them, 47.4% were married couples living together, 11.2% had a female householder with no husband present, 7.9% had a male householder with no wife present, and 33.6% were non-families. 28.3% of all households were made up of individuals, and 9.2% had someone living alone who was 65 years of age or older. The average household size was 2.45 and the average family size was 2.98.

The median age in the village was 39.7 years. 21.4% of residents were under the age of 18; 7.6% were between the ages of 18 and 24; 28.9% were from 25 to 44; 29.4% were from 45 to 64; and 12.6% were 65 years of age or older. The gender makeup of the village was 47.7% male and 52.3% female.

=== 2000 census ===
As of the census of 2000, there were 328 people, 139 households, and 94 families living in the village. The population density was 476.7 inhabitants per square mile (184.1/km^{2}). There were 158 housing units at an average density of 229.6 per square mile (88.6/km^{2}). The racial makeup of the village was 98.17% White, 0.61% African American, 0.61% Native American, 0.30% Asian, and 0.30% from two or more races. Hispanic or Latino of any race were 0.30% of the population.

There were 139 households, out of which 30.2% had children under the age of 18 living with them, 50.4% were married couples living together, 15.8% had a female householder with no husband present, and 31.7% were non-families. 25.9% of all households were made up of individuals, and 13.7% had someone living alone who was 65 years of age or older. The average household size was 2.36 and the average family size was 2.81.

In the village, the population was spread out, with 21.3% under the age of 18, 11.6% from 18 to 24, 30.8% from 25 to 44, 23.5% from 45 to 64, and 12.8% who were 65 years of age or older. The median age was 36 years. For every 100 females, there were 94.1 males. For every 100 females age 18 and over, there were 95.5 males.

The median income for a household in the village was $25,000, and the median income for a family was $30,000. Males had a median income of $29,167 versus $18,542 for females. The per capita income for the village was $12,770. About 7.6% of families and 12.9% of the population were below the poverty line, including 13.7% of those under age 18 and 9.8% of those age 65 or over.

== See also ==
- List of cities and towns along the Ohio River
