= Ohio State Route 325 =

State highway in southeastern Ohio, US

State Route 325

Route information
- Maintained by ODOT
- Length: 24.101 mi (38.787 km)
- Existed: 1932–present

Major junctions
- South end: SR 141 near Rio Grande
- US 35 near Rio Grande
- North end: SR 124 near Rutland

Location
- Country: United States
- State: Ohio
- Counties: Gallia, Meigs

Highway system
- Ohio State Highway System; Interstate; US; State; Scenic
← SR 324	→ SR 326

State Route 325 (SR 325) is a north–south state highway in the southeastern corner of the U.S. state of Ohio. The southern terminus of SR 325 is at SR 141 about 6 miles (9.7 km) south of Rio Grande. Its northern terminus is at a T-intersection with SR 124 approximately 5 miles (8.0 km) west of the village of Rutland.

== Route description ==
The segment of SR 325 between SR 141 and US 35 is part of the southern loop of the Welsh Scenic Byway, a 64-mile (103 km) route in Gallia and Jackson counties that connects historic Welsh American communities, churches, cemeteries, and farms.

== History ==
The intersection of SR 325 and SR 588 in Rio Grande was proposed to be converted to a roundabout in 2018; however, the project was canceled.

== Major intersections ==
County	Location	mi	km	Destinations	Notes
Gallia	Perry Township	0.000	0.000	SR 141 – Gallipolis, Ironton	
Gallia	Rio Grande	6.783	10.916	SR 588 east	Western terminus of SR 588
Gallia	Raccoon Township	7.061	11.364	US 35 – Gallipolis, Jackson	Interchange
Gallia	Raccoon Township	7.213	11.608	SR 554 east – Bidwell	Western terminus of SR 554
Gallia	Vinton	14.212	22.872	SR 160 west (Jackson Street) / Van Buren Street	Southern end of SR 160 concurrency
Gallia	Vinton	14.457	23.266	SR 160 east (Jackson Street) / Scenic Drive	Northern end of SR 160 concurrency
Meigs	Salem Township	24.101	38.787	SR 124 – Wilkesville, Rutland	
1.000 mi = 1.609 km; 1.000 km = 0.621 mi: Concurrency terminus
