= Crown City, Ohio =

- Village
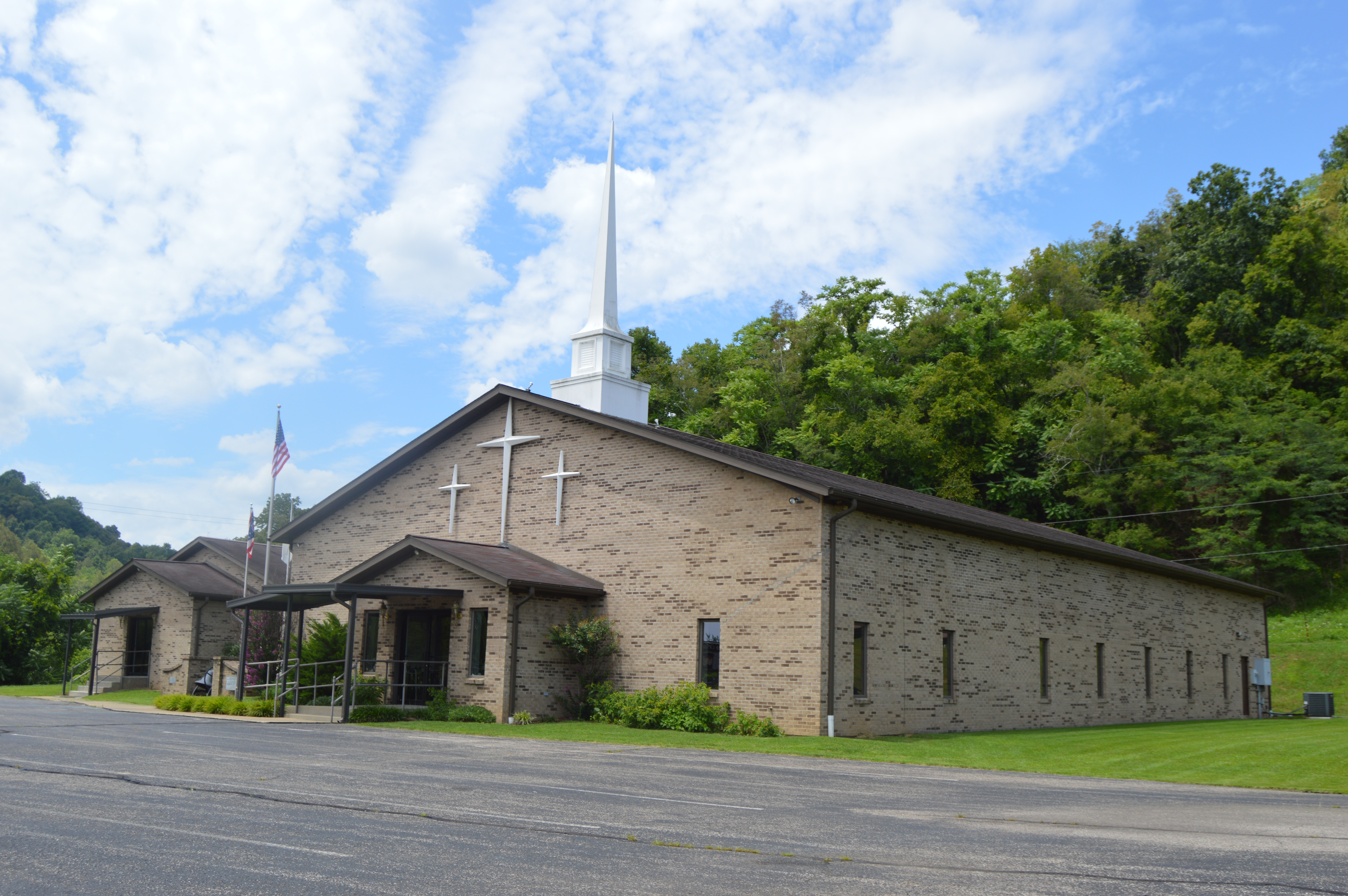
- Wesleyan church on State Route 7

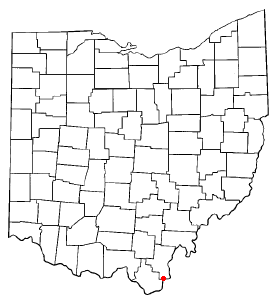
- Location of Crown City, Ohio

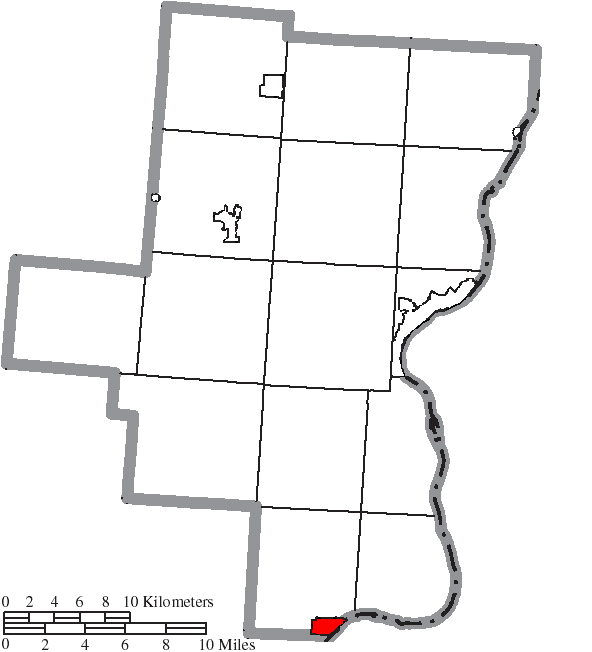
- Location of Crown City in Gallia County
- Coordinates: 38°35′24″N 82°17′28″W
- Country: United States
- State: Ohio
- County: Gallia
- Township: Guyan

Area
  - Total: 1.20 sq mi (3.10 km^{2})
  - Land: 1.16 sq mi (3.01 km^{2})
  - Water: 0.035 sq mi (0.09 km^{2})
- Elevation: 650 ft (200 m)

Population (2020)
  - Total: 424
  - Estimate (2023): 421
  - Density: 365.3/sq mi (141.03/km^{2})
- Time zone: UTC-5 (Eastern (EST))
  - Summer (DST): UTC-4 (EDT)
- ZIP code: 45623
- Area code: 740
- FIPS code: 39-19554
- GNIS feature ID: 2398656

Crown City is a village in Gallia County, Ohio, United States, along the Ohio River. The population was 424 at the 2020 census.

== Geography ==
According to the United States Census Bureau, the village has a total area of 1.20 square miles (3.11 km^{2}), of which 1.16 square miles (3.00 km^{2}) is land and 0.04 square miles (0.10 km^{2}) is water.

== Demographics ==
Historical population
Census	Pop.	Note	%±
1880	248		—
1890	235		−5.2%
1900	284		20.9%
1910	295		3.9%
1920	288		−2.4%
1930	292		1.4%
1940	364		24.7%
1950	301		−17.3%
1960	323		7.3%
1970	371		14.9%
1980	513		38.3%
1990	445		−13.3%
2000	411		−7.6%
2010	413		0.5%
2020	424		2.7%
2023 (est.)	421	▼	−0.7%
U.S. Decennial Census

=== 2010 census ===
As of the census of 2010, there were 413 people, 176 households, and 129 families living in the village. The population density was 356.0 inhabitants per square mile (137.5/km^{2}). There were 200 housing units at an average density of 172.4 per square mile (66.6/km^{2}). The racial makeup of the village was 98.8% White, 1.0% Asian, and 0.2% from two or more races. Hispanic or Latino of any race were 0.5% of the population.

There were 176 households, of which 30.7% had children under the age of 18 living with them, 55.7% were married couples living together, 13.1% had a female householder with no husband present, 4.5% had a male householder with no wife present, and 26.7% were non-families. 22.2% of all households were made up of individuals, and 6.8% had someone living alone who was 65 years of age or older. The average household size was 2.35 and the average family size was 2.73.

The median age in the village was 42.6 years. 19.9% of residents were under the age of 18; 6.2% were between the ages of 18 and 24; 27.4% were from 25 to 44; 27.5% were from 45 to 64; and 18.9% were 65 years of age or older. The gender makeup of the village was 47.5% male and 52.5% female.

=== 2000 census ===
As of the census of 2000, there were 411 people, 165 households, and 125 families living in the village. The population density was 375.7 inhabitants per square mile (145.1/km^{2}). There were 194 housing units at an average density of 177.3 per square mile (68.5/km^{2}). The racial makeup of the village was 97.81% White, 0.24% African American, 0.24% from other races, and 1.70% from two or more races. Hispanic or Latino of any race were 1.22% of the population.

There were 165 households, out of which 33.3% had children under the age of 18 living with them, 63.6% were married couples living together, 10.3% had a female householder with no husband present, and 24.2% were non-families. 19.4% of all households were made up of individuals, and 11.5% had someone living alone who was 65 years of age or older. The average household size was 2.49 and the average family size was 2.85.

In the village, the population was spread out, with 24.1% under the age of 18, 7.8% from 18 to 24, 29.2% from 25 to 44, 22.9% from 45 to 64, and 16.1% who were 65 years of age or older. The median age was 37 years. For every 100 females, there were 86.0 males. For every 100 females age 18 and over, there were 83.5 males.

The median income for a household in the village was $25,909, and the median income for a family was $35,000. Males had a median income of $33,750 versus $16,538 for females. The per capita income for the village was $17,553. About 13.6% of families and 20.0% of the population were below the poverty line, including 31.3% of those under age 18 and 5.8% of those age 65 or over.

== Education ==
Public education in the village of Crown City is provided by the Fairland Local School District.

The village is part of the Rio Grande Community College district.

== See also ==
- List of cities and towns along the Ohio River
