= National Register of Historic Places listings in Lawrence County, Ohio =

Location of Lawrence County in Ohio

This is a list of the National Register of Historic Places listings in Lawrence County, Ohio.

This is intended to be a complete list of the properties and districts on the National Register of Historic Places in Lawrence County, Ohio, United States. The locations of National Register properties and districts for which the latitude and longitude coordinates are included below, may be seen in an online map.

There are 20 properties and districts listed on the National Register in the county.

This National Park Service list is complete through NPS recent listings posted March 14, 2025.

== Current listings ==
	Name on the Register	Image	Date listed	Location	City or town	Description
1	Brumberg Building	Brumberg Building	March 6, 2008 (#08000148)	222 S. 3rd St. 38°32′02″N 82°41′05″W	Ironton	
2	Burlington 37 Cemetery	Burlington 37 Cemetery	September 28, 2001 (#01001064)	Center St. in Burlington; 38°24′41″N 82°31′12″W	Fayette Township	
3	Chesapeake High School	Chesapeake High School	February 16, 2018 (#100002122)	3748 State Route 7; 38°26′00″N 82°25′45″W	Union Township	Now the Chesapeake Community Center
4	Downtown Ironton Historic District	Downtown Ironton Historic District	January 8, 2009 (#08001296)	Portions of 2nd, 3rd, 4th, 5th, Center Sts., Park Ave., Vernon St., and Bobby Bare Boulevard; 38°32′06″N 82°41′05″W	Ironton	
5	F.W. Erlich House	F.W. Erlich House	October 3, 1980 (#80003134)	1908 S. 6th St. 38°31′18″N 82°40′13″W	Ironton	
6	Fifth and Lawrence Streets Residential District	Fifth and Lawrence Streets Residential District	August 2, 1978 (#78002098)	5th and Lawrence Sts. 38°32′18″N 82°41′06″W	Ironton	
7	Grand Army of the Republic Memorial Hall	Grand Army of the Republic Memorial Hall	September 19, 2012 (#12000801)	401 Railroad St. 38°32′15″N 82°41′08″W	Ironton	
8	William C. Johnston House and General Store	William C. Johnston House and General Store	September 7, 1976 (#76001463)	Washington and Davidson Sts. in Burlington; 38°24′22″N 82°31′51″W	Fayette Township	
9	Macedonia Church	Macedonia Church	February 7, 1978 (#78002096)	North of Burlington; 38°26′22″N 82°31′46″W	Fayette Township	
10	Maplewood	Maplewood	April 13, 1977 (#77001070)	West of Chesapeake on Maplewood Lane; 38°25′22″N 82°28′23″W	Fayette Township	
11	Marlow Theatre	Marlow Theatre	March 6, 2008 (#08000149)	S. 3rd St. and Park Ave. 38°32′03″N 82°41′06″W	Ironton	
12	Marting Hotel	Marting Hotel	March 12, 1999 (#99000331)	202 Park Ave. 38°32′03″N 82°41′07″W	Ironton	
13	Miller-Knight House	Miller-Knight House	August 4, 2003 (#03000720)	2 Township Road 1046; 38°32′27″N 82°17′53″W	Rome Township	
14	Norfolk And Western Railroad Depot	Norfolk And Western Railroad Depot	September 13, 1978 (#78002099)	1st St. and Park Ave. 38°32′03″N 82°41′11″W	Ironton	
15	Old Lawrence County Jail	Old Lawrence County Jail	December 22, 1978 (#78002097)	Court St. in Burlington; 38°24′26″N 82°31′43″W	Fayette Township	
16	Olive Furnace	Olive Furnace	April 12, 2007 (#07000299)	State Route 93 at Township Road 239 (Olive Branch Rd.), north of Pedro; 38°45′45″N 82°37′50″W	Washington Township	
17	Rankin Historic District	Rankin Historic District	July 26, 1979 (#79001876)	Roughly bounded by Vernon, 7th, Monroe and 4th Sts. 38°32′04″N 82°40′48″W	Ironton	
18	Scottown Covered Bridge	Scottown Covered Bridge	November 12, 1975 (#75001456)	East of Scottown on State Route 67; 38°32′52″N 82°22′49″W	Windsor Township	
19	Selby Shoe Company Building	Selby Shoe Company Building	June 18, 2009 (#09000444)	1603 S. 3rd St. 38°31′22″N 82°40′30″W	Ironton	
20	Vesuvius Furnace	Vesuvius Furnace	June 14, 1990 (#89001714)	Vesuvius Recreation Area off State Route 93, near Ironton; 38°36′19″N 82°37′49″W	Elizabeth Township	Originally located on County Highway 29 at Storms Creek in the Vesuvius Recreation Area of the Wayne National Forest; current boundaries reflect a boundary decrease of 2011-09-15

== See also ==
- List of National Historic Landmarks in Ohio
- Listings in neighboring counties: Boyd (KY), Cabell (WV), Gallia, Greenup (KY), Jackson, Scioto, Wayne (WV)
- National Register of Historic Places listings in Ohio
