= Burlington, Ohio =

- Census-designated place
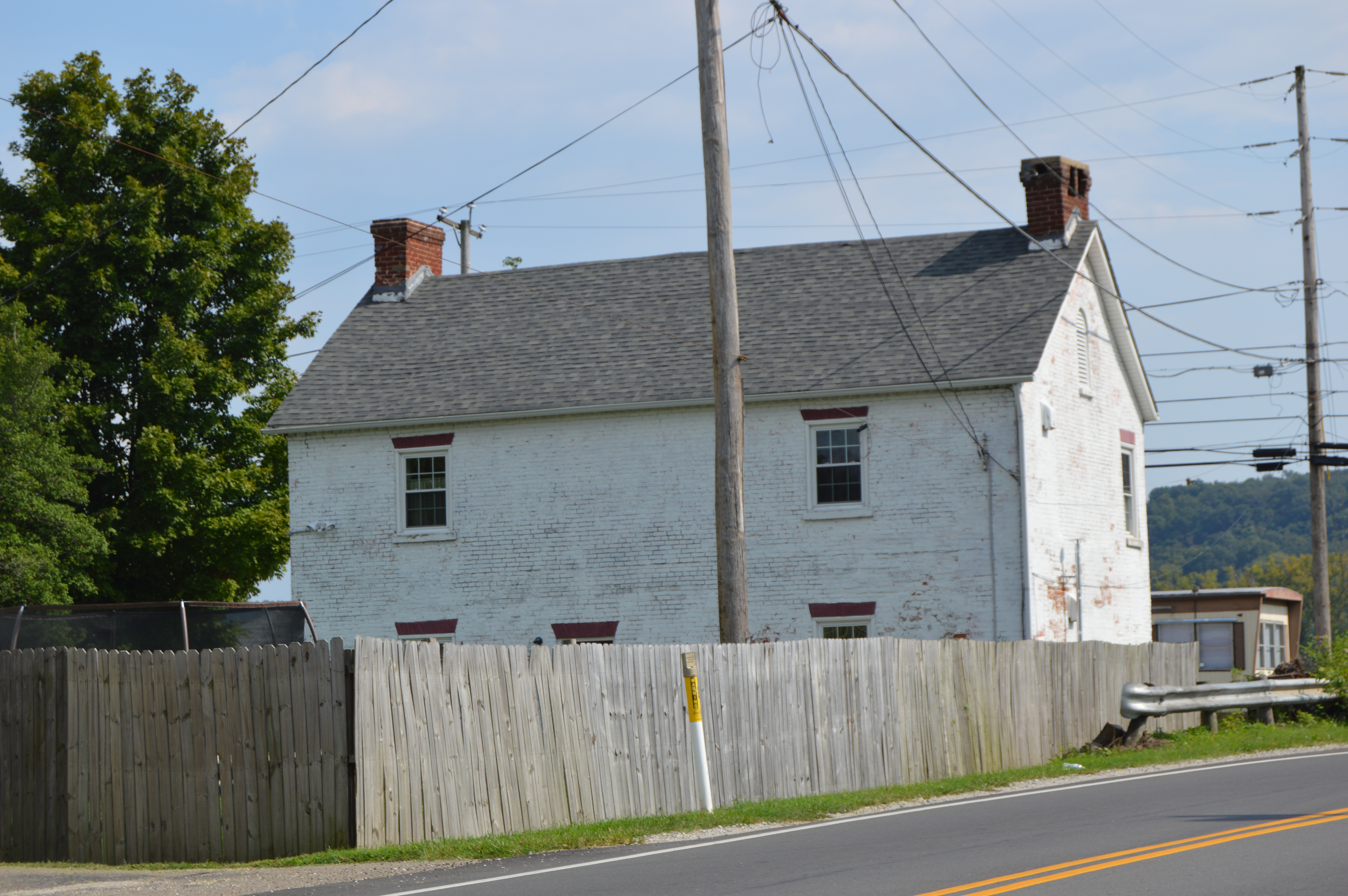
- William C. Johnston House

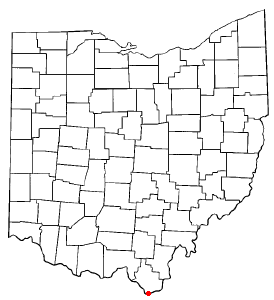
- Location of Burlington, Ohio
- Coordinates: 38°24′46″N 82°30′40″W
- Country: United States
- State: Ohio
- County: Lawrence
- Township: Fayette

Area
  - Total: 1.42 sq mi (3.67 km^{2})
  - Land: 1.39 sq mi (3.61 km^{2})
  - Water: 0.023 sq mi (0.06 km^{2})
- Elevation: 554 ft (169 m)

Population (2020)
  - Total: 2,416
  - Density: 1,733.6/sq mi (669.34/km^{2})
- Time zone: UTC-5 (Eastern (EST))
  - Summer (DST): UTC-4 (EDT)
- ZIP Code: 45680 (South Point)
- FIPS code: 39-10352
- GNIS feature ID: 2393357

Burlington is an unincorporated community and census-designated place in Lawrence County, Ohio, United States, along the Ohio River. The population was 2,416 at the 2020 census. Connected to neighboring Huntington, West Virginia and connected via the West Huntington Bridge over the Ohio River, it is part of the Huntington–Ashland metropolitan area. Burlington was once the leading community of Lawrence County, being the first county seat and the location of the county's first post office. “The Memory Man” by David Baldacci takes place in Burlington. The main character is Amos Decker. There are 7 books in this series.

== History ==
Beginning in 1817, Burlington was the first and previous county seat of Lawrence County, and its post office the only one in the county until 1821. The town was named after Burlington, Vermont.

The Burlington 37 Cemetery, the William C. Johnston House and General Store, and the Old Lawrence County Jail, all located in Burlington, are listed on the National Register of Historic Places, as is the nearby Macedonia Church.

== Geography ==
Burlington is located in southern Lawrence County.

According to the United States Census Bureau, the CDP has a total area of 1.4 square miles (3.6 km^{2}), all land. According to Census 2000: Incorporated Places/Census Designated Places, Cartographic Boundary Files - Ohio, the southern boundary of the Burlington CDP ends at the current Ohio River northern shoreline, the northern boundary is U.S. Route 52, the western boundary is the village of South Point, and the eastern boundary is the neighboring Sybene, Ohio.

While the village of South Point claims to be the southernmost point in Ohio, Burlington's southernmost point, just upstream from South Point's southern point, is plainly a short distance farther south.

=== Surrounding communities ===
Located on the southern shoreline of Fayette Township, Burlington borders the following communities:

- Huntington, West Virginia - southeast, across the Ohio River
- Ceredo, West Virginia — southwest, across the Ohio River
- South Point — west

Union Township and the village of Chesapeake lie a short distance upstream (east), and Perry Township lies a short distance downstream (northwest).

== Demographics ==
Historical population
Census	Pop.	Note	%±
2000	2,794		—
2010	2,676		−4.2%
2020	2,416		−9.7%
U.S. Decennial Census

As of the census of 2000, there were 2,794 people, 1,127 households, and 734 families residing in the CDP. The population density was 1,961.1 inhabitants per square mile (757.2/km^{2}). There were 1,242 housing units at an average density of 871.8 per square mile (336.6/km^{2}). The racial makeup of the CDP was 87.33% White, 9.48% African American, 0.25% Native American, 0.11% Asian, 0.47% from other races, and 2.36% from two or more races. Hispanic or Latino of any race were 1.72% of the population.

There were 1,127 households, out of which 25.9% had children under the age of 18 living with them, 46.8% were married couples living together, 13.6% had a female householder with no husband present, and 34.8% were non-families. 30.7% of all households were made up of individuals, and 15.0% had someone living alone who was 65 years of age or older. The average household size was 2.29 and the average family size was 2.84.

In the CDP the population was spread out, with 20.1% under the age of 18, 8.1% from 18 to 24, 23.4% from 25 to 44, 25.4% from 45 to 64, and 23.0% who were 65 years of age or older. The median age was 44 years. For every 100 females, there were 82.4 males. For every 100 females age 18 and over, there were 77.2 males.

The median income for a household in the CDP was $23,995, and the median income for a family was $29,934. Males had a median income of $28,750 versus $23,285 for females. The per capita income for the CDP was $15,619. About 14.3% of families and 16.6% of the population were below the poverty line, including 20.4% of those under age 18 and 8.7% of those age 65 or over.

== Education ==
Burlington is part of the South Point Local School District and maintains its own elementary school, Burlington Elementary School, in addition to South Point Middle School and South Point High School in neighboring South Point.

== Transportation ==
U.S. Route 52 passes through the northern side of the community.

Local airports include the Tri-State Airport in the Huntington area and the Lawrence County Airpark in Lawrence County, located at the eastern edge of the community.

== See also ==
- List of cities and towns along the Ohio River
