= Susanna M. D. Fry =

American educator (1841–1920)

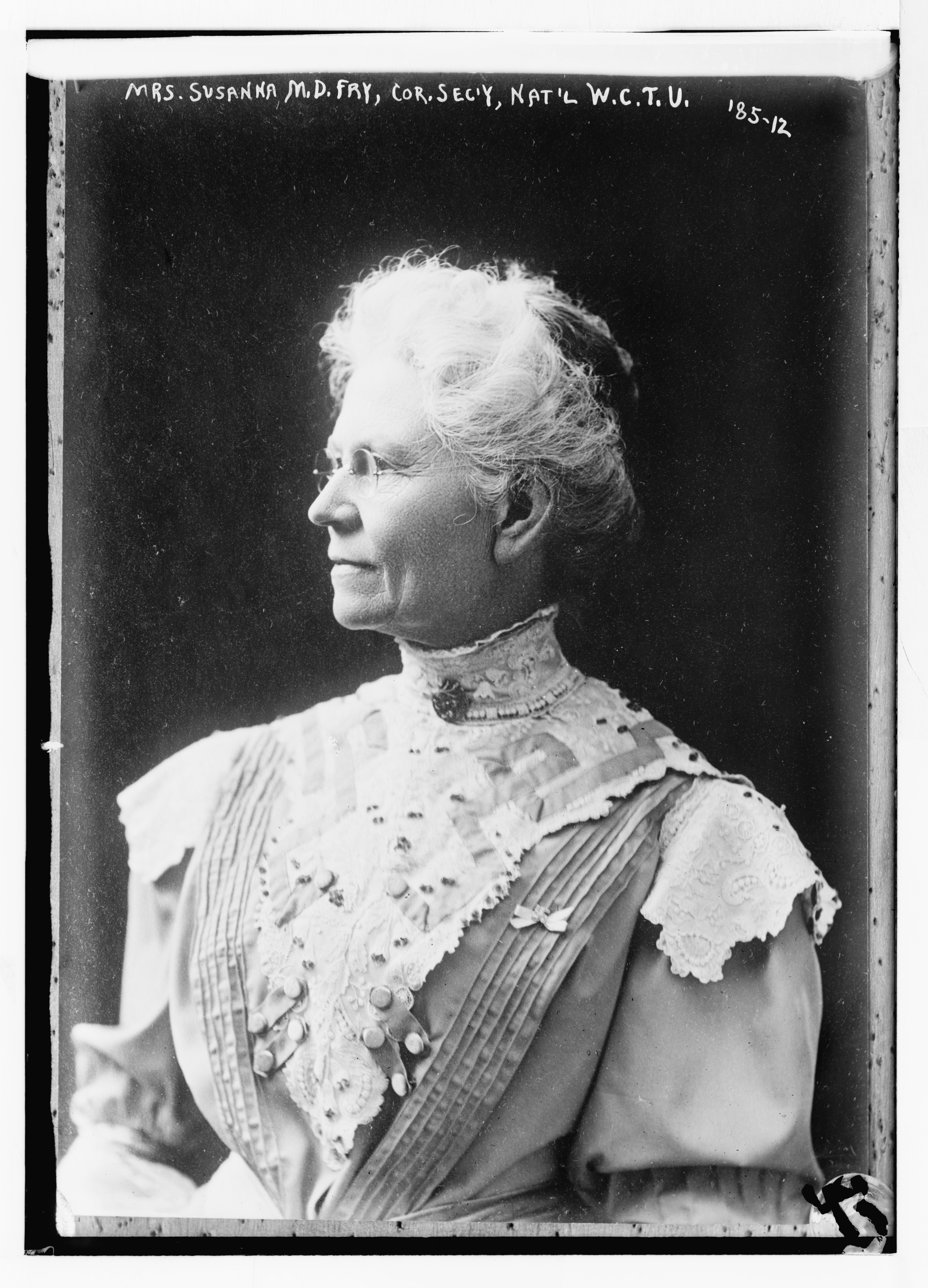
- Born: Susanna Margaret Davidson; February 4, 1841; Burlington, Ohio, U.S.
- Died: October 10, 1920 (aged 79); Bloomington, Illinois, U.S.
- Education: Western College for Women; Ohio Wesleyan University; Syracuse University
- Occupation: professor
- Employers: Illinois Wesleyan University; University of Minnesota
- Organization: Woman's Christian Temperance Union
- Notable work: A Paradise Valley girl
- Movement: temperance
- Board member of: Alhambra, California school board
- Spouse: James D. Fry (m. 1868)

Susanna M. D. Fry (née, Davidson; February 4, 1841 – October 10, 1920) was an American educator and temperance worker. Her teaching career began in the primary department of the village school, but her superior ability as a teacher led her swiftly into positions of greater responsibility. Fry was a professor who held the chair of English literature at Illinois Wesleyan University, Bloomington, Illinois and at the University of Minnesota. She served as president of the Minnesota Woman's Christian Temperance Union (W.C.T.U.), and managing editor of The Union Signal, the organ of the National W.C.T.U. During her career as a professor and as an official of the W.C.T.U., Fry was a frequent speaker in Prohibition campaigns and at temperance conventions. Fry was the only woman chosen from the Methodist church to speak before the Parliament of the World's Religions, 1893.

== Early life and education ==
Susanna Margaret Davidson was born at Burlington, Ohio, February 4, 1841. Her parents were James H. DAvidson (1801–1894) and Mary Frances (Combs) Davidson (1807–1888). Susanna had eight brothers: Samuel, Joshua, Jeremiah, John, James, Benjamin, Joseph, and Mighill. The site of the town was donated by her grandfather for a county seat.

She was educated at Western College for Women, Oxford, Ohio (1855–59), and in succeeding years, took postgraduate work, obtaining the degree of A.M. from Ohio Wesleyan University (1878). Upon taking a non-resident, post-graduate course, with Syracuse University, she received the degree of Ph.D. for work in history, philosophy, and aesthetics (1881).

== Career ==
After leaving Oxford, she took up teaching. She was a teacher in public schools, Burlington, Ohio, 1860-2. There, her first "declaration" for justice and equality for women was when she declined to accept the "big room" of this same school at one-half the salary paid to male incumbents. She taught in a private school, Cleveland, Ohio, 1862–3; High School, Ironton, Ohio, 1863-5; and an Academy, Burlington, Ohio, 1866-8.

On June 21, 1868, she married the Rev. James D. Fry (1834–1910), at that time, a member of the Ohio Conference of the Methodist Episcopal Church. In the fall of 1873, the two went to Europe for a year's study and travel. Letters of travel, history, biography, and art, written by Fry from Europe, were printed in many papers and magazines.

From 1876 to 1890, she was a professor and held the chair of English literature at Illinois Wesleyan University. In 1890–01, she taught high school in Saint Paul, Minnesota, and during 1891 and 1892, was Professor of Literature and at the head of the English literature department in the University of Minnesota.

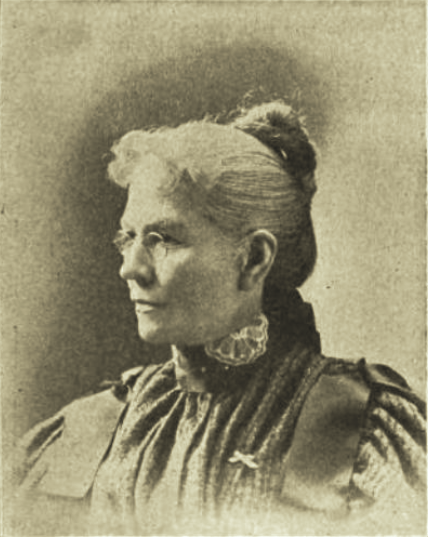
(undated)

The World's Columbian Exposition was held in Chicago in 1893, and Fry was selected to serve as a Judge in the Liberal Arts Department. At the same time, she was nominated by Lucy Rider Meyer to present a paper on Methodist educational work at the Parliament of the World's Religions, which was the largest of the congresses held in conjunction with the Exposition. Fry was the only woman chosen from the Methodist church to speak before the congress though it was to the consternation of the men of the church who were exceedingly unwilling to allow a woman to speak on this occasion even though she was well known in Methodist literary circles. Her paper was entitled, "Women in Methodist Education."

Fry became acquainted with Frances Willard, and the W.C.T.U. leader, recognizing Fry's fitness for leadership in temperance work, urged her to pursue that line. In 1894, Fry accepted the presidency of the Minnesota W.C.T.U., serving in that capacity for two years.

In 1896, when Margaret Ashmore Sudduth, managing editor of The Union Signal, was called away to care for her mother, Fry took over the role on a temporary basis. In November of that year, at the National W.C.T.U. Annual Meeting held in St. Louis, Missouri, Fry was elected to take over the position as Sudduth would not be returning. Fry held that position till 1898, when she was elected corresponding secretary of the National W.C.T.U.

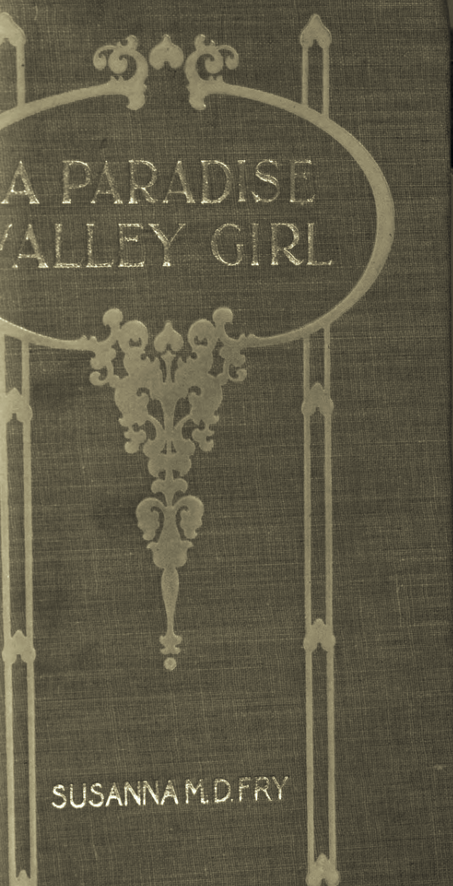
A Paradise Valley Girl

The Woman's Temperance Publishing Association published Fry's book, A Paradise Valley Girl, in 1899. It was full of character sketches and sly humor. Through the voice of a "new woman", she tells what she knows about girls, and what she thinks they ought to be taught. Fry was also a contributor to The Ladies' Repository and various papers and magazines.

During the 1901 Pan-American Exposition held in Buffalo, New York, Fry held the title of President, Woman's Board, W.C.T.U., Pan-American Exposition. Unexpectedly, at the Thirty-Fifth Annual Convention of the National W.C.T.U., held in Denver, Colorado, October 1908, Fry resigned from her position as corresponding secretary. It was believed that she gave up her position on account of failing health.

== Later life ==
In 1911, Fry was serving as W.C.T.U. National Superintendent of Literature. She was in Los Angeles County, California in 1915, serving on the Alhambra school board. In 1919, Fry was president of the Minnesota W.C.T.U.

Susanna M. D. Fry died in Bloomington, Illinois, October 10, 1920.

== Selected works ==
- A Paradise Valley Girl, 1899 (Text)
- The flower of temperance chivalry – Frances E. Willard, 1925 (Text)
