= Olive Furnace =

- U.S. National Register of Historic Places
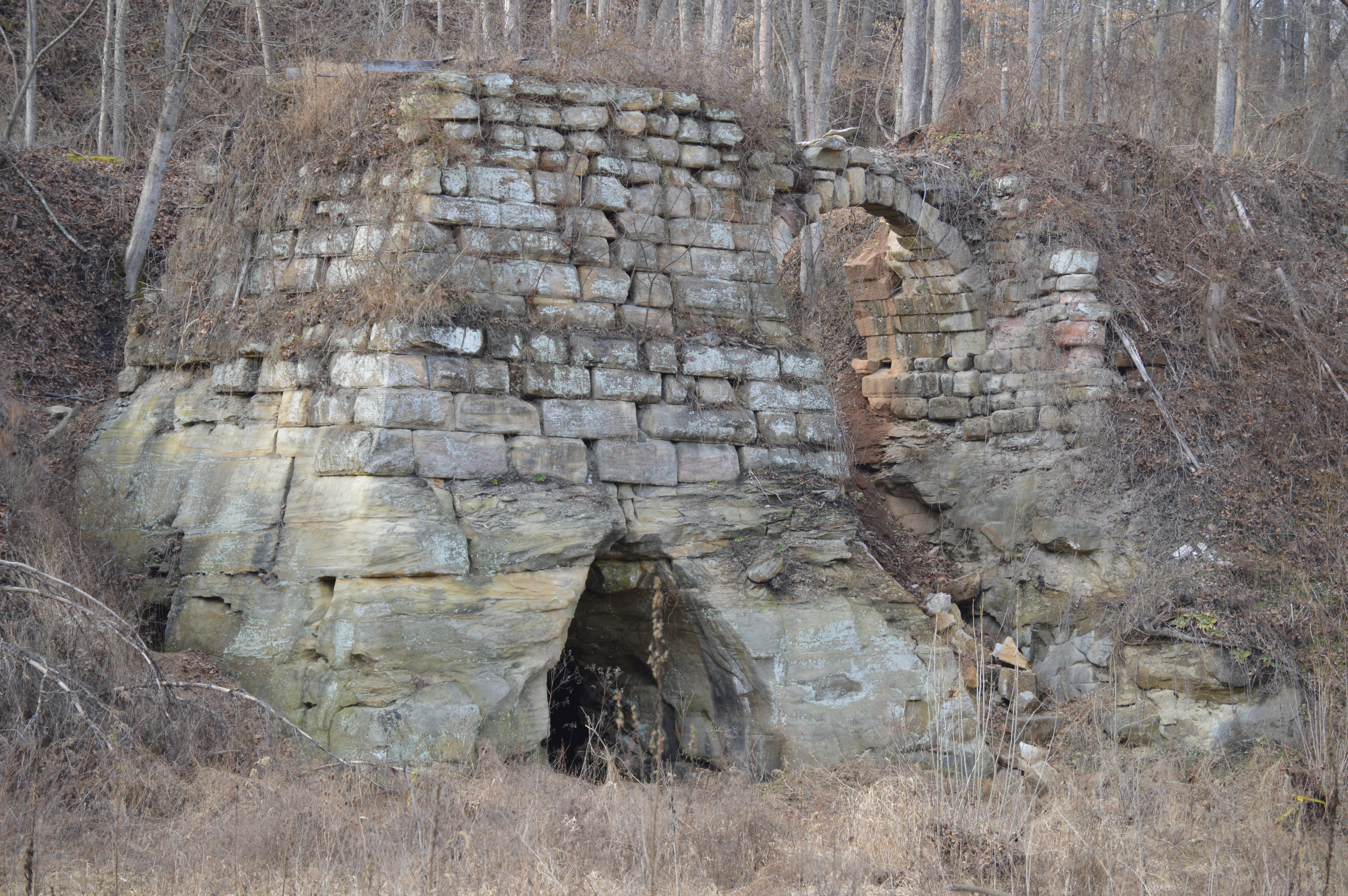
- Front, seen from State Route 93

- Location within Ohio Location within the United States
- Nearest city: Pedro, Ohio
- Coordinates: 38°45′44″N 82°37′50″W
- Area: 6.3 acres (2.5 ha)
- Built: 1846
- Architectural style: Iron Furnace
- NRHP reference No.: 07000299
- Added to NRHP: April 12, 2007

Olive Furnace, also known as Mount Olive Furnace, is a historic iron furnace site on State Route 93 at Township Road 239 (Olive Branch Rd.), north of Pedro, Ohio in Washington Township, Lawrence County, Ohio. It was added to the National Register of Historic Places on April 12, 2007. The Mt. Olive Furnace Park Corporation currently owns the site and is planning to proceed with the restoration of the buildings surrounding the old stack and arch.

== See also ==
- National Register of Historic Places listings in Lawrence County, Ohio
