= Rock Camp =

Rock Camp may refer to:

- Rock Camp, Ohio, an unincorporated community in Lawrence County, Ohio, U.S.
- Rock Camp, West Virginia, an unincorporated community in Monroe County, West Virginia, U.S.
- Rock Camp (TV series), a 2004 Canadian reality television series

== See also ==
- Camp Rock (disambiguation)
