= Camp Rock (disambiguation) =

Camp Rock is a 2008 American television film.

Camp Rock may also refer to:

- Camp Rock (soundtrack), from the 2008 film
- Camp Rock (Virginia), a summit in Virginia, US

== See also ==
- Camp Rock Enon, a Boy Scouts of America summer camp
- My Camp Rock, a singing competition based on the 2008 film, with separate competitions in several countries
- Rock Camp (disambiguation)
