= Ohio University Southern Campus =

Public satellite campus in Ironton, Ohio

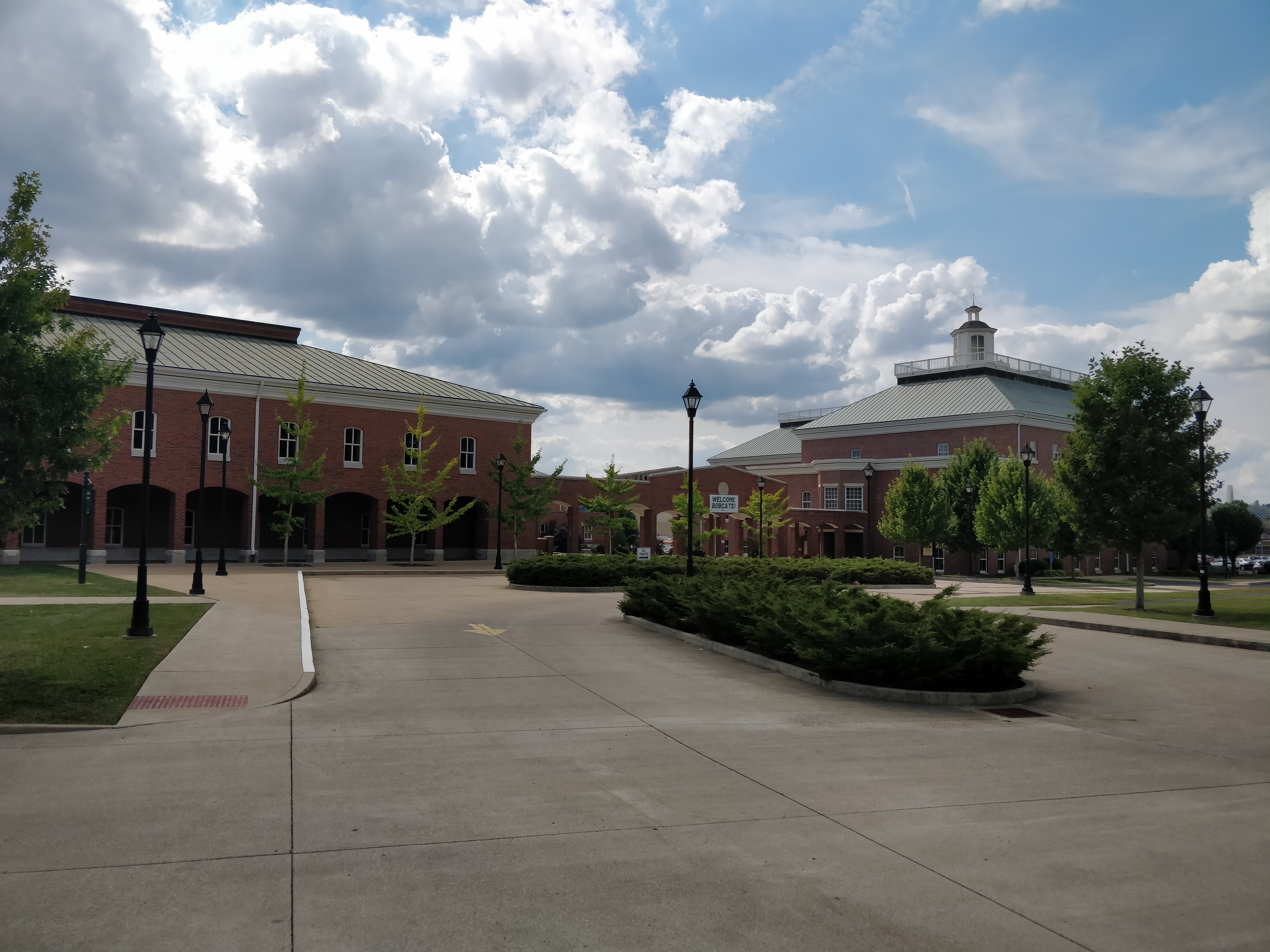
- Type: Public satellite campus
- Established: 1956; 70 years ago
- Parent institution: Ohio University
- Dean: Debbie Marinski
- Students: 1,105
- Location: Ironton, Ohio, United States
- Campus: Rural
- Colors: Cutler green and cupola white
- Nickname: Trailblazers
- Website: www.ohio.edu/southern/

Ohio University Southern is a satellite campus of Ohio University in Ironton, Ohio. The campus began in 1956 when Ohio University hosted college-level classes in Ironton High School with an initial enrollment of 90 students.

== Campus ==
The main Ohio University Southern campus in Ironton has four buildings. The Collins Center offers student services, including enrollment offices. Four lecture halls, an auditorium, library, and The Southernmost Café. It was the first structure completed on the new campus, completed in 1985. The Academic Building contains the Center for Nursing Education, the Caucus Room, a biology and chemistry lab, and the TASC Lab. The Riffe Centerhas numerous classrooms, administration offices and audio/video laboratories. The Dingus Technology Center has faculty offices, an auditorium, the art department, two computer labs, nursing labs, and three Ohio University Learning Network rooms.

The Ohio Horse Park in Franklin Furnace, Ohio, is also operated by the campus. It is a large 184-acre (74 ha) horse farm. It also offers rental of facilities for shows and clinics to the public. Two disciplines of horseback riding at four different levels are taught at the horse park.

== Academics ==
Ohio University Southern Campus offers 11 associate degrees and 8 bachelor's degrees. The library contains 25,000 volumes, 200 periodical subscriptions, as well as microforms, audiovisual materials, CD-ROMS and electronic databases. The Library has a Quiet Study Room and a Group Study Room available for student use.

== Ohio University Proctorville Center ==
Ohio University Proctorville Center began offering classes in trailers at the Lawrence County Fairgrounds at Proctorville in the late 1970s. It moved to schools in Chesapeake and at Fairland before opening a new center on Ohio State Route 7 in downtown Proctorville in 1992. An increase in enrollment led to cramped conditions and calls for a new facility.

In 2000, Proctorville resident Marshall L. Smith donated land on Ohio State Route 775 for the new Proctorville Center. Design work for the 17,000-square-foot (1,600 m^{2}) structure began in 2004. Groundbreaking for the new building was held on July 12, 2005. It was completed in September 2006 for $4.9 million, most of which came from donations from the community. The structure included 14 classrooms and was named Greg Smith Hall in honor of Marshall L. Smith's late son.

On March 14, 2023, Ohio University announced its intentions to sell the Proctorville Campus, stating the center has had declining enrollment and decreased revenues. In a letter, university president Hugh Sherman said, "In discussions with our staff at the Proctorville Center, additional reviews of the facility use over the past several years, and enrollment projections, we have determined that it is in the university's best interest to move forward with the sale of the Proctorville Center."

On October 12, 2023, Collins Career Technical Center acquired OU's Southern campus for $1.4 million. Collins Superintendent Adam M. Pittis said the center would move its allied health services adult classes to its new Proctorville Campus.
