= Fayette Township, Lawrence County, Ohio =

Township in Ohio, US

- Township
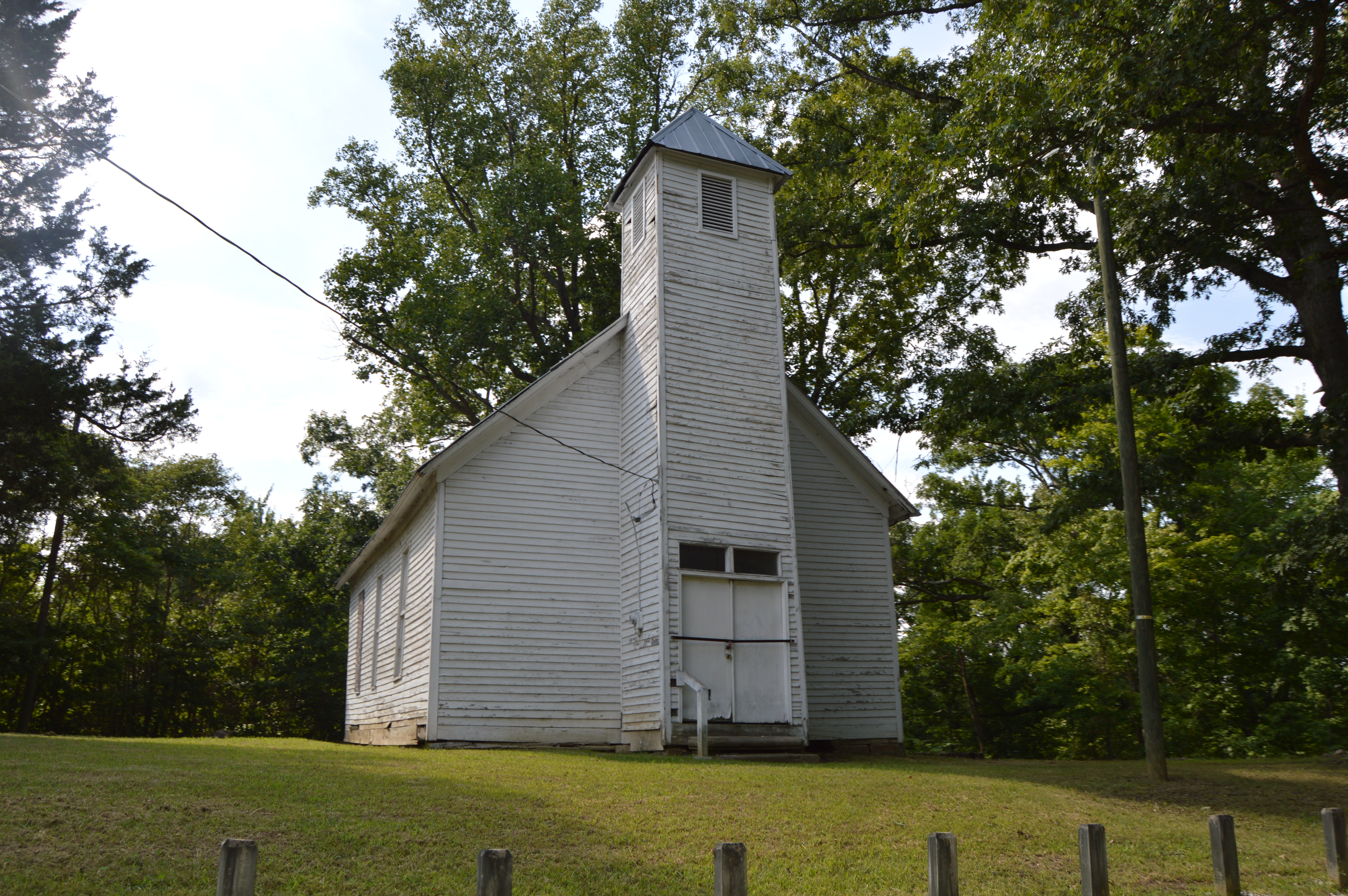
- Former Macedonia Baptist Church on Macedonia-Burlington Road

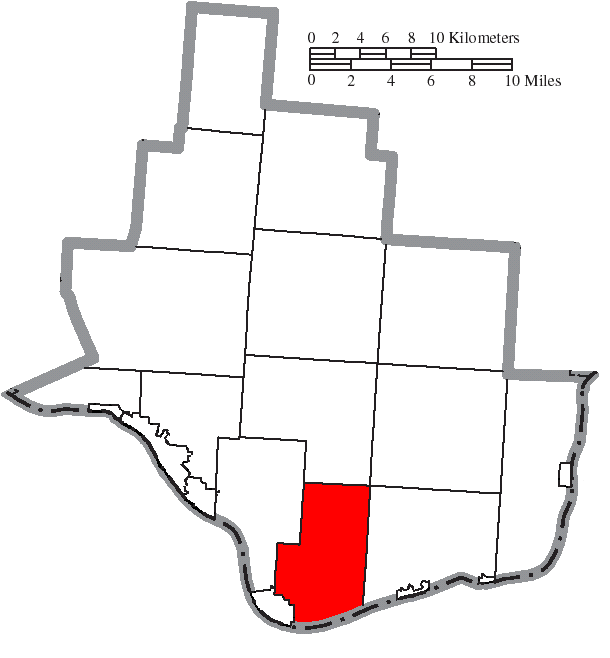
- Location of Fayette Township in Lawrence County
- Coordinates: 38°25′32″N 82°32′29″W
- Country: United States
- State: Ohio
- County: Lawrence

Area
  - Total: 27.7 sq mi (71.8 km^{2})
  - Land: 27.4 sq mi (71.0 km^{2})
  - Water: 0.31 sq mi (0.8 km^{2})
- Elevation: 863 ft (263 m)

Population (2020)
  - Total: 8,494
  - Density: 310/sq mi (120/km^{2})
- Time zone: UTC-5 (Eastern (EST))
  - Summer (DST): UTC-4 (EDT)
- FIPS code: 39-26782
- GNIS feature ID: U.S. Geological Survey Geographic Names Information System: 1086441

Fayette Township is one of the fourteen townships of Lawrence County, Ohio, United States. As of the 2020 census the population was 8,494. Fayette Township includes Ohio's most southerly point.

== Geography ==
Located in the far southern part of the county along the Ohio River, it borders the following townships:

- Lawrence Township - north
- Windsor Township - southeast corner
- Union Township - east
- Perry Township - west

West Virginia lies across the Ohio River to the south: Cabell County in the far southeast, and Wayne County otherwise.

It is located in the middle of Lawrence County's Ohio River townships.

Part of South Point, the second-largest municipality in Lawrence County, is located along the downstream shoreline of Fayette Township. Most of the rest of the shoreline is occupied by the census-designated place of Burlington.

== Name and history ==
It is the only Fayette Township statewide. It was named Fayette, in honor of Marquis Lafayette, who was a popular hero of that time and who visited Burlington in 1826.

== Government ==
The township is governed by a three-member board of trustees, who are elected in November of odd-numbered years to a four-year term beginning on the following January 1. Two are elected in the year after the presidential election and one is elected in the year before it. There is also an elected township fiscal officer, who serves a four-year term beginning on April 1 of the year after the election, which is held in November of the year before the presidential election. Vacancies in the fiscal officership or on the board of trustees are filled by the remaining trustees.
