= Firebrick, Ohio =

Community in Lawrence County, Ohio, US

- Unincorporated community
- Location within Ohio Location within the United States
- Coordinates: 38°50′21″N 82°38′44″W
- Country: United States
- State: Ohio
- Counties: Lawrence
- Township: Washington
- Elevation: 669 ft (204 m)
- Time zone: UTC-5 (Eastern (EST))
  - Summer (DST): UTC-4 (EDT)
- ZIP code: 45656
- Area code: 740
- GNIS feature ID: 1075850

Firebrick (previously known as Spencer) is an unincorporated community in Washington Township, Lawrence County, Ohio, United States. It is located between Oak Hill and South Webster near the intersection of Ohio State Route 140 and Blackfork-Firebrick Road.

== History ==
The Firebrick Post Office was established in the Donley Store on April 14, 1911. William S. Hamilton was the first Postmaster, followed by Chester C. Donley. It then became a Rural Branch of the Oak Hill Post Office on September 1, 1959, and was discontinued entirely between 1973 and 1974. Mail service is now sent through the Oak Hill branch.
