= South Point, Ohio =

- Village
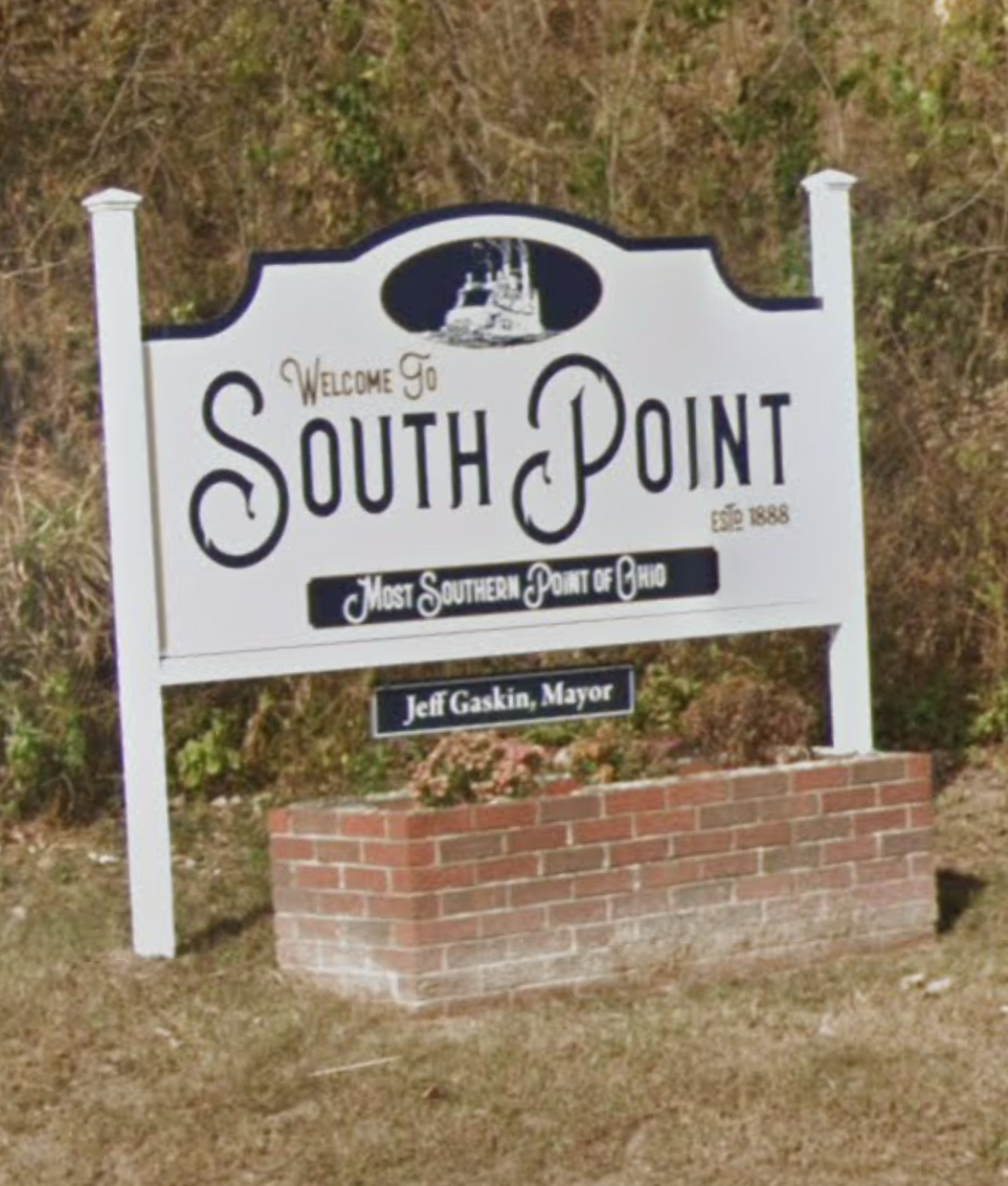
- South Point Welcome Sign

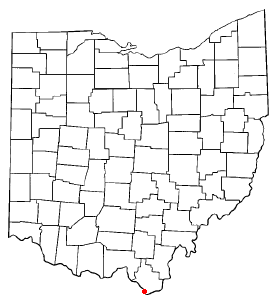
- Location of South Point, Ohio

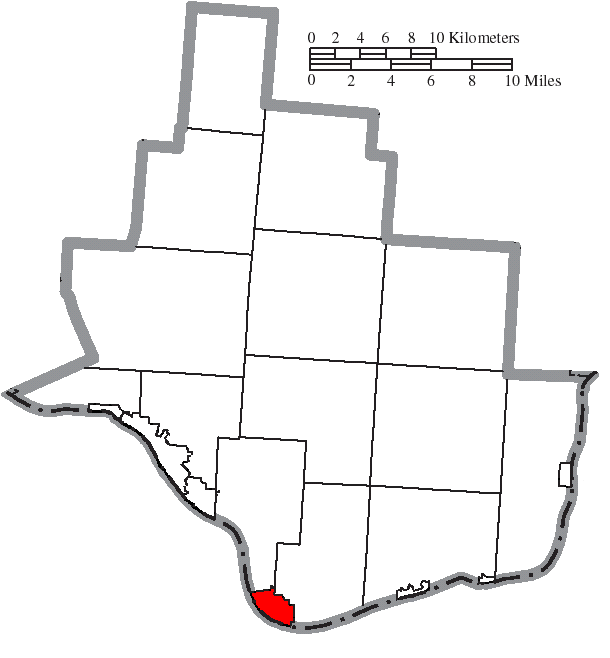
- Location of South Point in Lawrence County
- Coordinates: 38°25′17″N 82°34′42″W
- Country: United States
- State: Ohio
- County: Lawrence
- Townships: Perry, Fayette
- Established: 1888

Government
  - Mayor: Jeff Gaskin

Area
  - Total: 3.24 sq mi (8.38 km^{2})
  - Land: 2.95 sq mi (7.63 km^{2})
  - Water: 0.29 sq mi (0.75 km^{2})
- Elevation: 597 ft (182 m)

Population (2020)
  - Total: 3,836
  - Estimate (2024): 3,663
  - Density: 1,302.7/sq mi (502.99/km^{2})
- Time zone: UTC-5 (Eastern (EST))
  - Summer (DST): UTC-4 (EDT)
- ZIP code: 45680
- Area code: 740
- FIPS code: 39-73670
- GNIS feature ID: 2399853
- Website: Village website

South Point is a village in Lawrence County, Ohio, United States, along the Ohio River. The population was 3,836 at the 2020 census. It is part of the Huntington–Ashland metropolitan area. It is the southern-most incorporated municipality in Ohio.

== History ==
A post office called South Point has been in operation since 1855 in Fayette Township. The village was so named for the fact the southernmost point in the state is contained within its borders. Now considered to be a populated place within South Point, in 1918 the community of North Kenova was located at (38.412, -82.578), so named because it was on the opposite bank of the Ohio River from Kenova, West Virginia.

== Geography ==
South Point lies at the junction point of the three states of Ohio, West Virginia, and Kentucky. Not far from the village lies the southernmost point in the State of Ohio, along the Ohio River less than one mile east of the village's southeast corner.

According to the United States Census Bureau, the village has a total area of 3.23 square miles (8.37 km^{2}), of which 2.94 square miles (7.61 km^{2}) is land and 0.29 square miles (0.75 km^{2}) is water.

=== Climate ===
Climate data for South Point, Ohio, 1991–2020 normals, extremes 1990–present
Month	Jan	Feb	Mar	Apr	May	Jun	Jul	Aug	Sep	Oct	Nov	Dec	Year
Record high °F (°C)	76 (24)	80 (27)	87 (31)	91 (33)	94 (34)	104 (40)	105 (41)	104 (40)	98 (37)	95 (35)	88 (31)	77 (25)	105 (41)
Mean maximum °F (°C)	66.3 (19.1)	70.2 (21.2)	77.2 (25.1)	84.4 (29.1)	88.6 (31.4)	92.5 (33.6)	94.7 (34.8)	93.4 (34.1)	90.9 (32.7)	83.9 (28.8)	76.2 (24.6)	67.2 (19.6)	96.0 (35.6)
Mean daily maximum °F (°C)	42.5 (5.8)	46.2 (7.9)	55.8 (13.2)	67.9 (19.9)	75.7 (24.3)	83.4 (28.6)	86.4 (30.2)	85.5 (29.7)	79.8 (26.6)	68.9 (20.5)	56.7 (13.7)	46.4 (8.0)	66.3 (19.0)
Daily mean °F (°C)	33.6 (0.9)	36.3 (2.4)	44.6 (7.0)	55.1 (12.8)	64.5 (18.1)	73.0 (22.8)	76.4 (24.7)	75.2 (24.0)	68.7 (20.4)	57.1 (13.9)	45.7 (7.6)	37.7 (3.2)	55.7 (13.2)
Mean daily minimum °F (°C)	24.6 (−4.1)	26.5 (−3.1)	33.4 (0.8)	42.4 (5.8)	53.3 (11.8)	62.6 (17.0)	66.4 (19.1)	64.9 (18.3)	57.6 (14.2)	45.3 (7.4)	34.6 (1.4)	29.0 (−1.7)	45.1 (7.2)
Mean minimum °F (°C)	5.6 (−14.7)	8.9 (−12.8)	15.8 (−9.0)	26.8 (−2.9)	36.5 (2.5)	49.3 (9.6)	55.5 (13.1)	53.8 (12.1)	43.3 (6.3)	30.6 (−0.8)	19.5 (−6.9)	12.8 (−10.7)	2.2 (−16.6)
Record low °F (°C)	−21 (−29)	−15 (−26)	−6 (−21)	18 (−8)	26 (−3)	36 (2)	46 (8)	45 (7)	32 (0)	19 (−7)	8 (−13)	3 (−16)	−21 (−29)
Average precipitation inches (mm)	3.51 (89)	3.55 (90)	4.59 (117)	4.19 (106)	4.85 (123)	4.54 (115)	5.65 (144)	4.08 (104)	3.88 (99)	3.30 (84)	3.19 (81)	4.15 (105)	49.48 (1,257)
Average snowfall inches (cm)	3.2 (8.1)	1.2 (3.0)	0.8 (2.0)	0.0 (0.0)	0.0 (0.0)	0.0 (0.0)	0.0 (0.0)	0.0 (0.0)	0.0 (0.0)	0.0 (0.0)	0.1 (0.25)	0.9 (2.3)	6.2 (15.65)
Average precipitation days (≥ 0.01 in)	13.6	12.1	13.5	13.5	13.8	12.3	11.8	9.7	8.8	9.5	11.3	13.0	142.9
Average snowy days (≥ 0.1 in)	2.2	1.3	0.6	0.0	0.0	0.0	0.0	0.0	0.0	0.0	0.1	0.7	4.9
Source 1: NOAA
Source 2: National Weather Service

== Demographics ==
Historical population
Census	Pop.	Note	%±
1900	281		—
1910	316		12.5%
1920	406		28.5%
1930	499		22.9%
1940	605		21.2%
1950	804		32.9%
1960	1,663		106.8%
1970	2,910		75.0%
1980	3,918		34.6%
1990	3,823		−2.4%
2000	3,742		−2.1%
2010	3,958		5.8%
2020	3,836		−3.1%
U.S. Decennial Census

=== 2020 census ===
As of the 2020 census, South Point had a population of 3,836. The median age was 43.4 years. 20.4% of residents were under the age of 18 and 20.3% of residents were 65 years of age or older. For every 100 females there were 93.0 males, and for every 100 females age 18 and over there were 88.0 males age 18 and over.

94.1% of residents lived in urban areas, while 5.9% lived in rural areas.

There were 1,586 households in South Point, of which 28.8% had children under the age of 18 living in them. Of all households, 47.5% were married-couple households, 15.6% were households with a male householder and no spouse or partner present, and 29.0% were households with a female householder and no spouse or partner present. About 26.4% of all households were made up of individuals and 13.2% had someone living alone who was 65 years of age or older.

There were 1,718 housing units, of which 7.7% were vacant. The homeowner vacancy rate was 2.0% and the rental vacancy rate was 9.5%.

Racial composition as of the 2020 census
Race	Number	Percent
White	3,436	89.6%
Black or African American	137	3.6%
American Indian and Alaska Native	9	0.2%
Asian	15	0.4%
Native Hawaiian and Other Pacific Islander	0	0.0%
Some other race	29	0.8%
Two or more races	210	5.5%
Hispanic or Latino (of any race)	67	1.7%

=== 2010 census ===
As of the census of 2010, there were 3,958 people, 1,602 households, and 1,132 families living in the village. The population density was 1,346.3 inhabitants per square mile (519.8/km^{2}). There were 1,699 housing units at an average density of 577.9 per square mile (223.1/km^{2}). The racial makeup of the village was 94.2% White, 3.2% African American, 0.1% Native American, 0.5% Asian, 0.2% from other races, and 1.8% from two or more races. Hispanic or Latino of any race were 0.4% of the population.

There were 1,602 households, of which 33.0% had children under the age of 18 living with them, 53.1% were married couples living together, 12.1% had a female householder with no husband present, 5.5% had a male householder with no wife present, and 29.3% were non-families. 25.4% of all households were made up of individuals, and 10.5% had someone living alone who was 65 years of age or older. The average household size was 2.47 and the average family size was 2.92.

The median age in the village was 40.3 years. 23.3% of residents were under the age of 18; 7.4% were between the ages of 18 and 24; 25.2% were from 25 to 44; 26.8% were from 45 to 64; and 17.3% were 65 years of age or older. The gender makeup of the village was 46.8% male and 53.2% female.

=== 2000 census ===
As of the census of 2000, there were 3,742 people, 1,485 households, and 1,131 families living in the village. The population density was 1,547.0 inhabitants per square mile (597.3/km^{2}). There were 1,564 housing units at an average density of 646.6 per square mile (249.7/km^{2}). The racial makeup of the village was 95.91% White, 2.27% African American, 0.08% Native American, 0.16% Asian, 0.03% Pacific Islander, and 1.55% from two or more races. Hispanic or Latino of any race were 0.32% of the population.

There were 1,485 households, out of which 31.0% had children under the age of 18 living with them, 61.8% were married couples living together, 10.2% had a female householder with no husband present, and 23.8% were non-families. 21.1% of all households were made up of individuals, and 8.4% had someone living alone who was 65 years of age or older. The average household size was 2.52 and the average family size was 2.89.

In the village, the population was spread out, with 23.1% under the age of 18, 8.3% from 18 to 24, 27.8% from 25 to 44, 25.5% from 45 to 64, and 15.3% who were 65 years of age or older. The median age was 39 years. For every 100 females, there were 89.9 males. For every 100 females age 18 and over, there were 89.4 males.

The median income for a household in the village was $33,110, and the median income for a family was $34,560. Males had a median income of $32,439 versus $21,496 for females. The per capita income for the village was $15,296. About 9.0% of families and 11.3% of the population were below the poverty line, including 17.2% of those under age 18 and 3.7% of those age 65 or over.

== Government and politics ==
The village is managed by a mayor, and a six-member village council. Jeff Gaskin is mayor.

== Education ==
The South Point Local School District serves the village and nearby unincorporated areas. Beginning in March 2004, the district embarked on a project to construct all new school buildings, including demolishing certain buildings: the location of the old middle and high schools is the location of the new South Point Elementary School, while the location of the new Burlington Elementary School is the same as that of the old.

South Point has a public library, a branch of Briggs Lawrence County Public Library.

== See also ==
- List of cities and towns along the Ohio River
- North Bend, Ohio, the most northerly point on the Ohio River
