= Downtown Ironton Historic District =

Historic district in Ohio, United States

- U.S. National Register of Historic Places
- U.S. Historic district
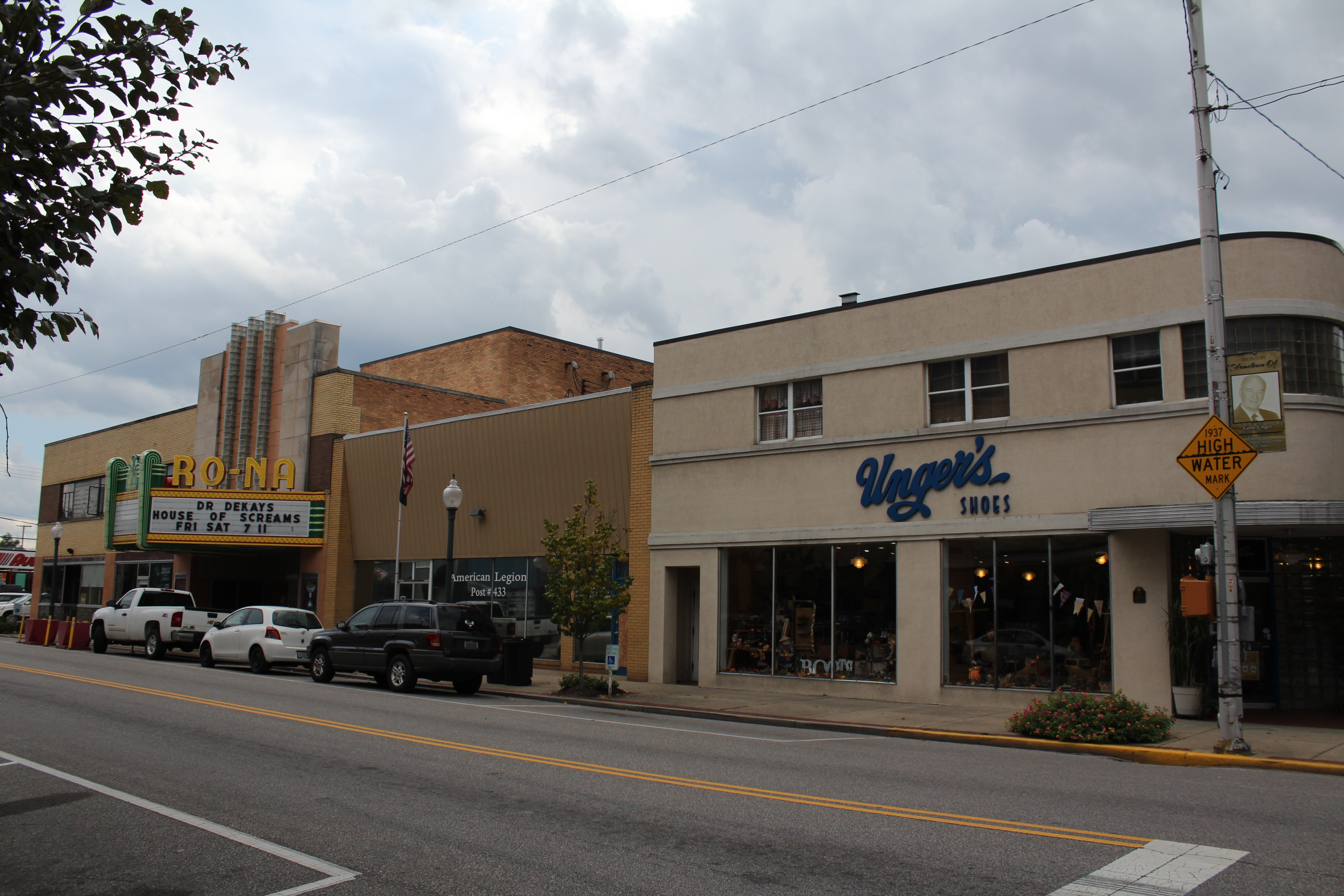
- Unger's Shoes and Ro'Na Theater located within the Historic District on South 3rd Street

- Location within Ohio Location within the United States
- Location: Portions of 2nd, 3rd, 4th, 5th, Center Sts., Park Ave., Vernon St. and Bobby Bare Blvd., Ironton, Ohio
- Coordinates: 38°32′06″N 82°41′05″W
- Area: 13 acres (5.3 ha)
- NRHP reference No.: 08001296
- Added to NRHP: January 8, 2009

The Downtown Ironton Historic District is a historic district located in downtown Ironton, Ohio. The district is roughly bounded by Washington and Center Streets and South 2nd and South 4th Streets. The buildings in the district were constructed between the 1870s and the 1950s. The district was added to the National Register of Historic Places on January 8, 2009.

A number of buildings which are individually listed on the National Register are located in the district, including the Marting Hotel, the Ironton Norfolk and Western Depot, the Brumberg Building, and the Marlow Theatre. The Lawrence County Courthouse, the county courthouse for Lawrence County, is located in the district. The district also includes historic commercial properties such as the Art Moderne-styled Unger's Shoes, the oldest shoe store in Ironton, and the Art Deco Ro'Na Theater.
