= Scottown Covered Bridge =

- U.S. National Register of Historic Places
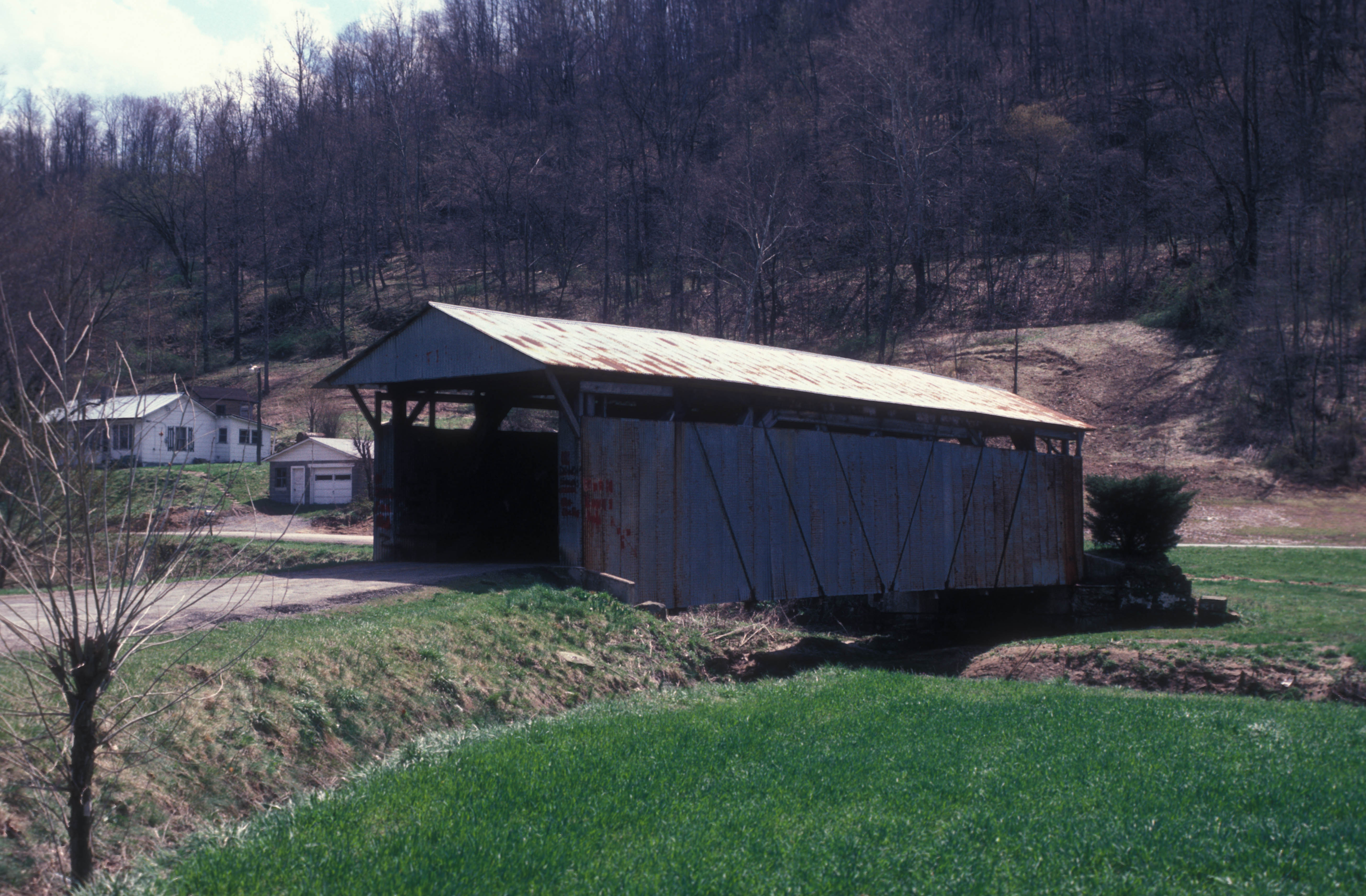

- Location within Ohio
- Nearest city: Scottown, Ohio
- Coordinates: 38°32′52″N 82°22′49″W
- Area: less than one acre
- Built: 1874, 1934
- Architectural style: Multiple Kingpost
- NRHP reference No.: 75001456
- Added to NRHP: November 12, 1975

The Scottown Covered Bridge, near Scottown, Ohio, was built in 1874. It was listed on the National Register of Historic Places in 1975. It is a Multiple Kingpost covered bridge.

It spans Indian Guyan Creek and is 85 feet (26 m) long. It has a corrugated metal roof. It is a multiple Kingpost and Queenpost bridge.

It is located east of Scottown on State Route 67 in Windsor Township, Lawrence County, Ohio

It was built in 1877. It survived several floods early in its history. It was modified in 1934 by the addition of a Burr Arch and steel tie rods.

It is covered in the Ohio Historic Places Dictionary.
