= Camp Rock (Virginia) =

Mountain in Virginia, United States

Coordinates: 36.8812106°N 82.6154345°W

Camp Rock (elevation: 3,898 feet (1,188 m)) is a summit in Wise and Scott counties, Virginia, in the United States.

Camp Rock was named from a campsite at a cliff used by pioneers.
