= Ironton station =

- Norfolk And Western Railroad Depot
- U.S. National Register of Historic Places
- U.S. Historic district – Contributing property
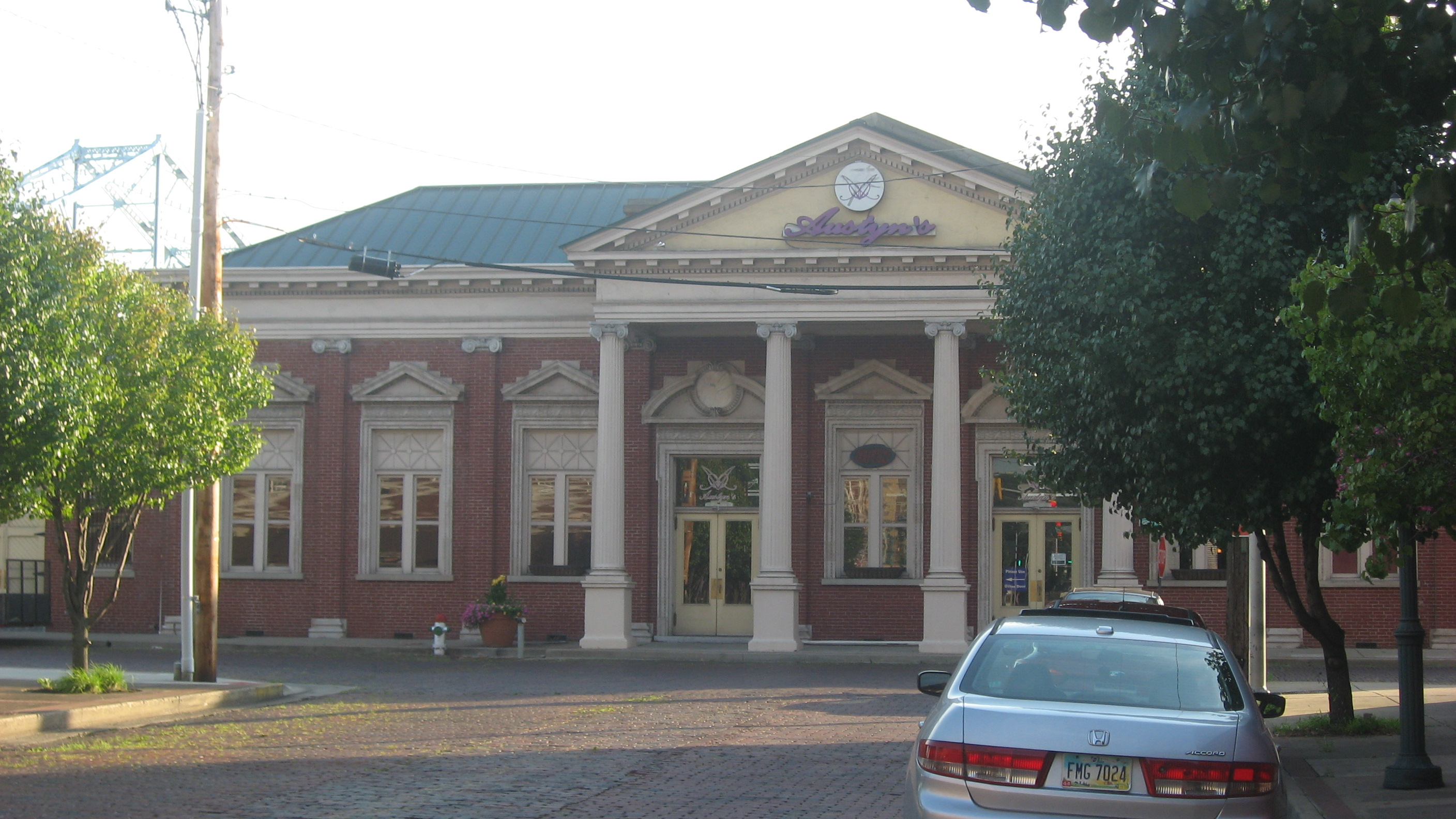
- Front of the former depot

- Location within Ohio Location within the United States
- Location: 1st St. and Park Ave., Ironton, Ohio
- Coordinates: 38°32′3″N 82°41′11″W
- Area: 0.7 acres (0.28 ha)
- Built: 1907
- Architect: Edward G. Frye
- Architectural style: Neoclassical
- Part of: Downtown Ironton Historic District (ID08001296)
- NRHP reference No.: 78002099
- Added to NRHP: September 13, 1978

The Ironton Norfolk and Western Depot is a former train station in downtown Ironton, Ohio, United States. Constructed at the beginning of the twentieth century, it served the transportation needs of its community for more than half a century, and it has been named a historic site because of its place in local history.

== History ==
Ironton and the surrounding Hanging Rock region were once among Ohio's most prominent industrial regions, due to extensive deposits of iron ore that were worked in the region's numerous charcoal-fired blast furnaces. For part of this period, land transportation in the region was served by the Scioto Valley Railroad, which enabled the Norfolk and Western Railway to gain access to the area in 1881 by purchasing the smaller railroad. By this time, industry was transitioning away from traditional iron smelting toward more modern methods of steel manufacturing, requiring the construction of improved trackside facilities in Ironton. As a result, the N&W erected the present station, beginning in 1906 and finishing construction in the following year. While it was built to furnish transportation for industrial purposes, the station also served the city's ordinary freight and passenger traffic needs. Trains ceased using the station when it closed in 1969. Since that time, the depot has been purchased by Ironton's city government, which leases it for commercial purposes; a series of restaurants has operated out of the building since its closure. In preparation for one such occupant, extensive renovations were performed in 2007, including refinishing of the hardwood floors, repairs to the roof, and replacement of older windows.

== Architecture ==
Built of brick on a brick foundation, the depot is a single-story building with a simple plan: shorter wings radiate out from both sides of the taller central structure. Separate hip roofs cover the central and side sections, except for the section above the main entrance, at which the roofline deviates to provide shelter as far as the edge of the street. Covered with a gabled roof, this extension features a four-pillar facade topped with a pediment and entablature. Smaller and simpler entrances are located to the sides of the building, which has a total area of approximately 5,000 square feet (460 m^{2}). Elements such as the main entrance combine to make the building a clear example of the Neoclassical style of architecture.

== Preservation ==
In 1978, the Ironton Norfolk and Western Depot was listed on the National Register of Historic Places, qualifying both because of its place in the area's history and because of its historic architecture. Thirty-one years later, much of downtown Ironton was designated a historic district and listed on the National Register; this zone, the Downtown Ironton Historic District, includes several blocks around the depot's location at the junction of Park Avenue and Bobby Bare Boulevard.

Preceding station	Norfolk and Western Railway	Following station
Sciotoville toward Cincinnati	Main Line	Kenova toward Norfolk
