= South Point Local School District =

School district in Ohio, United States

Address
- 302 High Street South Point, Ohio, 45680; United States

District information
- Type: Public
- Grades: PK–12
- Schools: 4
- NCES District ID: 3904795

Students and staff
- Students: 1,343 (2024–2025)
- Teachers: 82.00 (on an FTE basis) (2024–2025)
- Staff: 132.00 (on an FTE basis) (2024–2025)
- Student–teacher ratio: 16.38 (2024–2025)

Other information
- Website: www.southpoint.k12.oh.us

The South Point Local School District is a local school district serving the village of South Point and nearby areas at the southern point of Lawrence County, the most southerly county in the U.S. state of Ohio. Four schools are operated by the district: the South Point High School, the South Point Middle School, the South Point Elementary School, and the Burlington Elementary School.

Beginning in March 2004, the district embarked on a project to construct all new school buildings, including demolishing certain buildings: the location of the old middle and high schools is the location of the new South Point Elementary School, while the location of the new Burlington Elementary School is the same as that of the old.
