= Macedonia Baptist Church (Burlington, Ohio) =

Historic church in Ohio, United States

- Macedonia Church
- U.S. National Register of Historic Places
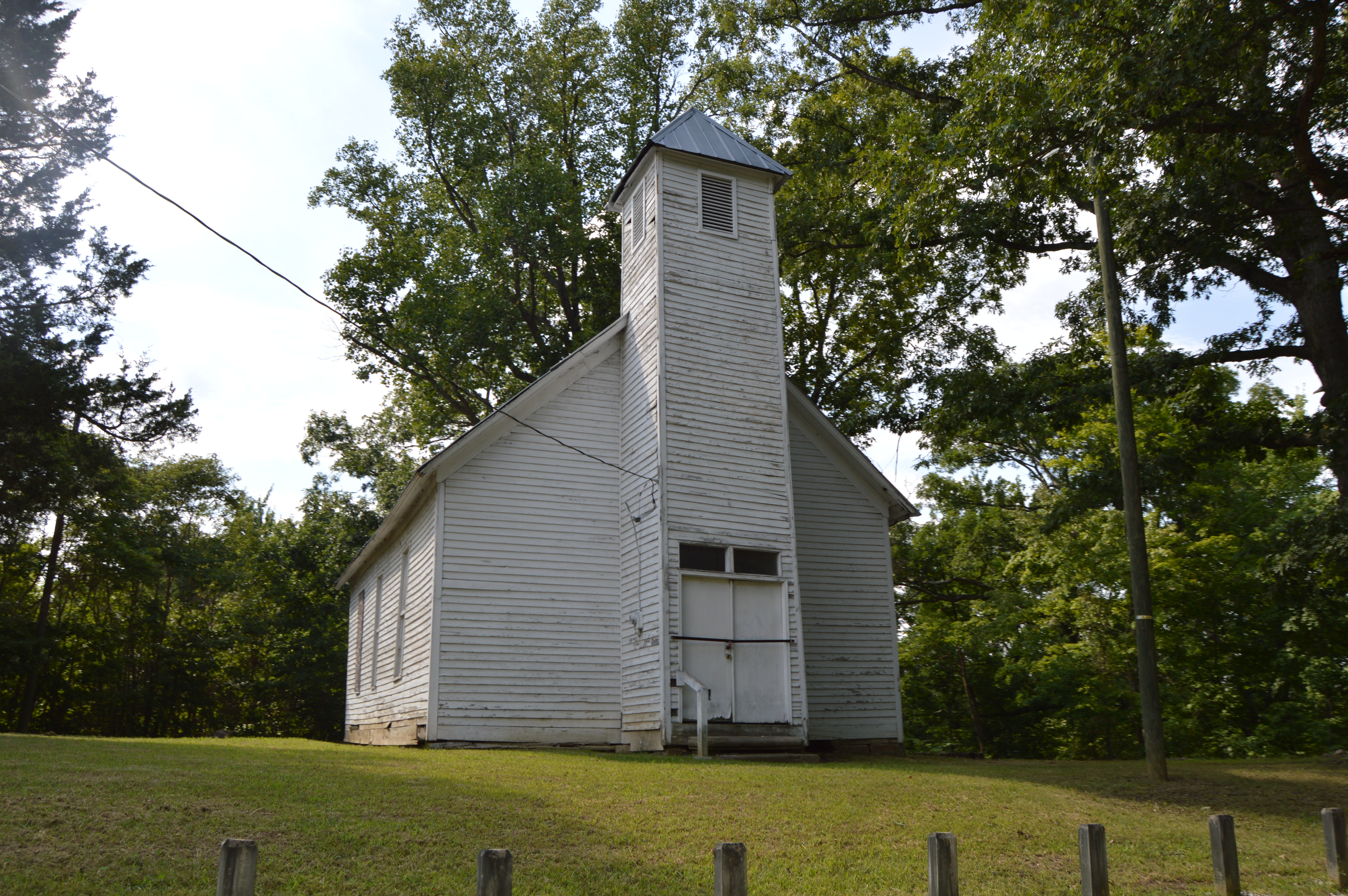
- Front of the church

- Location within Ohio Location within the United States
- Nearest city: Burlington, Ohio
- Coordinates: 38°26′22.5″N 82°31′46″W
- Area: 0.8 acres (0.32 ha)
- Built: 1849
- NRHP reference No.: 78002096
- Added to NRHP: February 7, 1978

The Macedonia Baptist Church is a historic former Baptist church building near the community of Burlington at the southern point of the U.S. state of Ohio. Constructed in the middle of the nineteenth century, it held a significant place in the culture of the local black population, and it has been named a historic site.

Situated at Ohio's southernmost point, the Burlington vicinity saw large numbers of runaway slaves and free black people in the decades before the Civil War. Into such a context, a group of Baptists settled and founded a church at some point between 1811 and 1813; after a period of worshipping in their homes, the congregation constructed a small and primitive church building. Late 1849 was the church's watershed moment: Virginia landowner James Twyman freed many of his slaves at his death and provided for them to be given land near Burlington, and thirty-seven of them settled near the church on land that they officially owned, beginning at the end of October. Joining with the existing Baptist congregation, they helped build a replacement church building on Macedonia Ridge, from which the congregation took its name of "Macedonia Missionary Baptist Church". With such a large group of black immigrants, the church began to occupy a prominent place for local black people, both religious and cultural, and as the years passed, numerous groups of members were sent out to found daughter churches; eight such churches, both in Ohio and in present-day West Virginia, remained active into the late twentieth century.

Macedonia Baptist Church is a simple building, constructed without an architectural style. Its plain gable-front plan features three side windows but no openings in the front gable per se; one enters through double doors at the base of a short bell tower, which is itself set into the front gable. Simple weatherboarding covers the walls, which rest on a stone foundation and are topped with a tin roof; the main body of the building has a plain roof with a steep pitch, although the tower's roughly square shape necessitates a pyramidal roof.

In 1978, Macedonia Baptist Church was listed on the National Register of Historic Places, qualifying both because of its historically significant architecture and because of its important place in local history. It is one of four Register-listed locations in and around Burlington, along with the old county jail, the local black cemetery, and the William C. Johnston House and General Store, and one of nineteen countywide. The Ohio Historical Society placed a state historical marker at the church in 2003.
