= Perry Township, Lawrence County, Ohio =

Township in Ohio, US

- Township
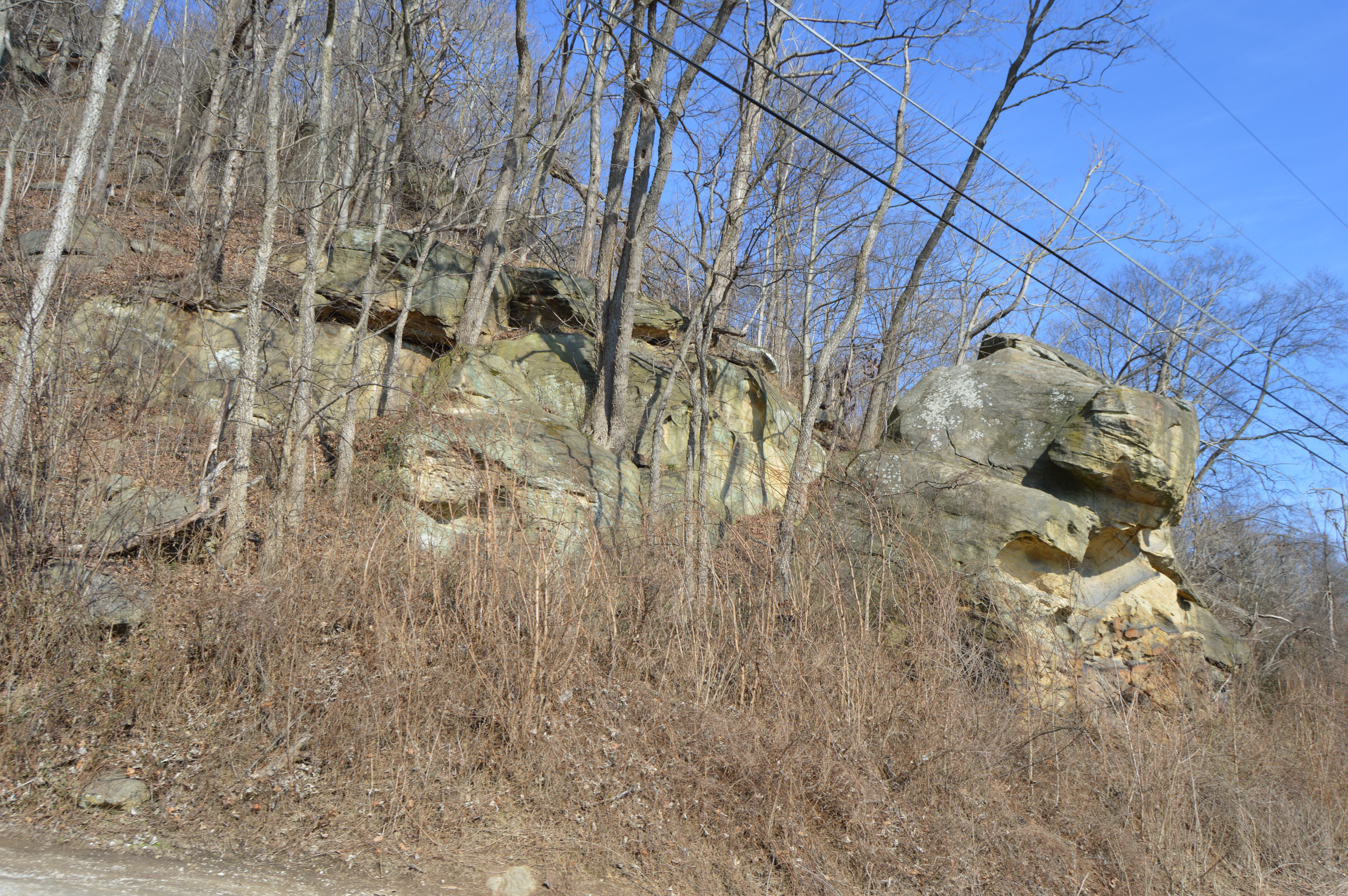
- Outcrops of stone on Lick Creek Road

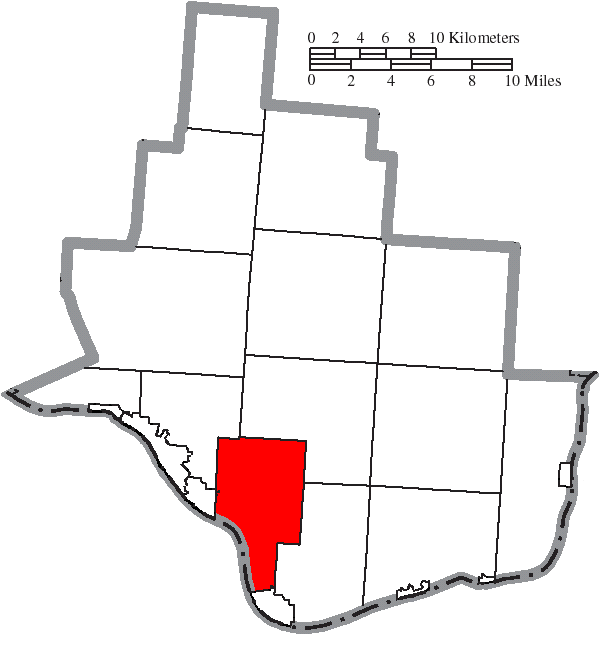
- Location of Perry Township in Lawrence County
- Coordinates: 38°28′37″N 82°35′26″W
- Country: United States
- State: Ohio
- County: Lawrence

Area
  - Total: 25.7 sq mi (66.5 km^{2})
  - Land: 25.5 sq mi (66.0 km^{2})
  - Water: 0.19 sq mi (0.5 km^{2})
- Elevation: 790 ft (240 m)

Population (2020)
  - Total: 6,533
  - Density: 256/sq mi (99.0/km^{2})
- Time zone: UTC-5 (Eastern (EST))
  - Summer (DST): UTC-4 (EDT)
- FIPS code: 39-61910
- GNIS feature ID: 1086445

Perry Township is one of the fourteen townships of Lawrence County, Ohio, United States. As of the 2020 census the population was 6,533.

== Geography ==
Located in the southern part of the county along the Ohio River, it borders the following townships:

- Lawrence Township - north
- Fayette Township - east
- Upper Township - west

Across the Ohio River from Perry Township is the mouth of the Big Sandy River, which forms the border between Boyd County, Kentucky, to the west and Wayne County, West Virginia, to the east.

It is located in the middle of Lawrence County's Ohio River townships.

The farthest southern point of Perry Township is occupied by part of the village of South Point, the second-largest municipality in Lawrence County, and a tiny part of Coal Grove extends into western Perry Township. The unincorporated community of Rock Camp is located in northwestern Perry Township.

== Name and history ==
It is one of twenty-six Perry Townships statewide. It was named in honor of Commodore Oliver H. Perry, who defeated the British on Lake Erie in 1814.

== Government ==
The township is governed by a three-member board of trustees, who are elected in November of odd-numbered years to a four-year term beginning on the following January 1. Two are elected in the year after the presidential election and one is elected in the year before it. There is also an elected township fiscal officer, who serves a four-year term beginning on April 1 of the year after the election, which is held in November of the year before the presidential election. Vacancies in the fiscal officership or on the board of trustees are filled by the remaining trustees.

== Education ==
The educational services of Perry Township are provided by Dawson-Bryant Local School District (K-12), South Point Local School District(K-12), along with the Rock Hill School District (K-12).
