= Ironton, Ohio =

- City
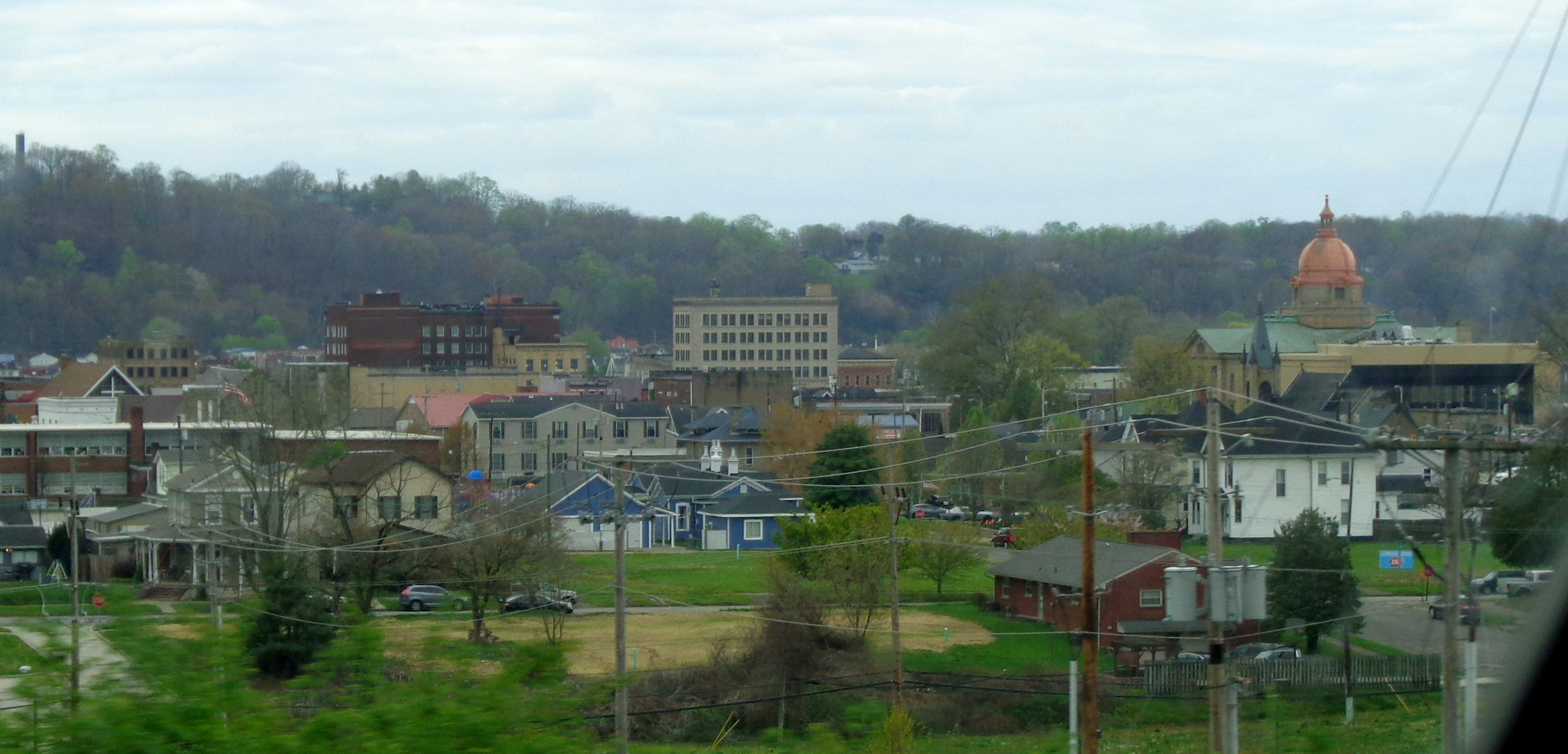
- Downtown Ironton looking southwest from U.S. Route 52
- Interactive map of Ironton, Ohio
- Location within Ohio Location within the United States
- Coordinates: 38°30′56″N 82°39′50″W
- Country: United States
- State: Ohio
- County: Lawrence
- Founded: 1849

Government
  - Mayor: Sam Cramblit

Area
  - City: 4.75 sq mi (12.31 km^{2})
  - Land: 4.47 sq mi (11.58 km^{2})
  - Water: 0.29 sq mi (0.74 km^{2})
- Elevation: 558 ft (170 m)

Population (2020)
  - City: 10,571
  - Estimate (2025): 10,148
  - Density: 2,365.2/sq mi (913.22/km^{2})
  - Metro: 288,648
- Time zone: UTC-5 (EST)
  - Summer (DST): UTC-4 (EDT)
- ZIP code: 45638
- Area code: 740
- FIPS code: 39-37464
- GNIS feature ID: 2395438
- Website: https://irontonohio.org/

Ironton is a city in Lawrence County, Ohio, United States, and its county seat. Its population was 10,571 at the 2020 census. Located in southernmost Ohio along the Ohio River, it is 20 miles (32 km) northwest of Huntington, West Virginia, within the Huntington–Ashland metropolitan area. The city's name is a contraction of "iron town", stemming from its long ties to the iron industry. It also had one of the first professional football teams, the Ironton Tanks.

== History ==
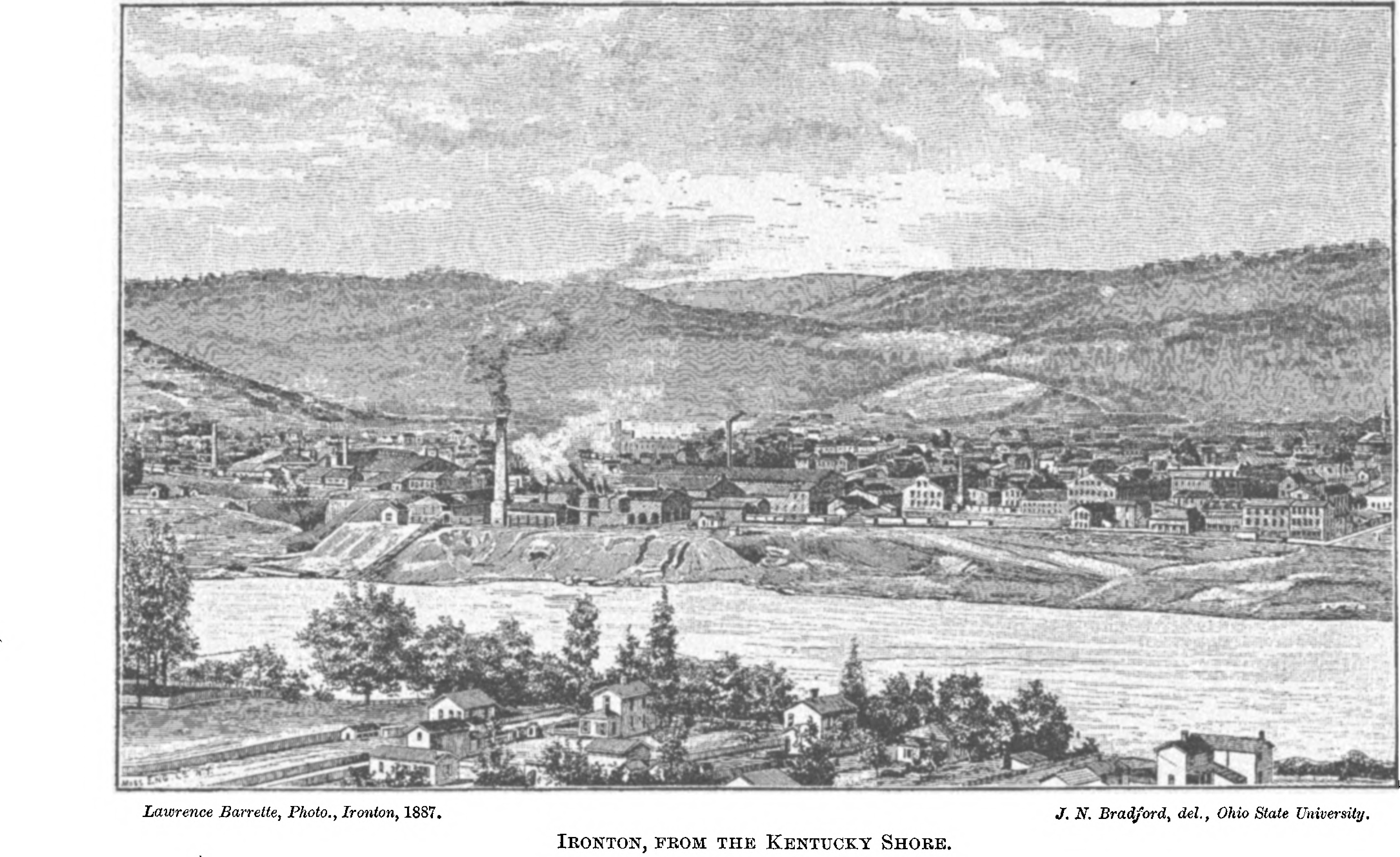
Ironton in 1887

Ironton was founded in 1849 by John Campbell, a prominent pig iron manufacturer in the area. He chose the location of Ironton because of its site along the Ohio River, which would allow for water transport of iron ore to markets downriver.

Between 1850 and 1890, Ironton was one of the foremost producers of iron in the world. England, France, and Russia all purchased iron for warships from here due to the quality. Iron produced here was used for the USS Monitor, the United States' first ironclad ship. More than 90 furnaces were operating at the peak of production in the late 19th century.

The iron industry generated revenues that were invested in new industries, such as soap and nail production. The Detroit, Toledo and Ironton Railroad was constructed through two states, carrying iron to Henry Ford's automaking plants in Michigan. The city had a street railway, the Ironton Petersburg Street Railway, four daily newspapers, and a few foreign-language publications. Ironton was also known for its accommodating attitude toward sin and vice associated with the mine and ironworkers.

=== Underground Railroad and Civil War ===
With its location on the Ohio River, Ironton became a destination on the Underground Railroad for refugee slaves seeking freedom in the North. John Campbell and some other city leaders sheltered slaves in their homes during their journeys.

During the American Civil War, local military regiments were mustered, quartered, and trained at Camp Ironton, a military post located at the county fairgrounds.

=== Changing economics of the iron industry ===
The downfall of Ironton came as the market for iron changed. Also, the nation was making the transition from a demand for iron to steel. After a nationwide economic recession in the late 19th century, Ironton was no longer growing.

The Norfolk and Western Railway built a new railroad station downtown in 1906, and it continued in operation into the mid-20th century. Two major floods (1917, 1937) caused extensive damage to the city and its industries. The second flood came during the Great Depression; together with the shift in the iron industry, it devastated the city. The iron industry declined, affecting other industries, as well. As the iron industries closed, Ironton had little with which to replace them.

An industrial city, Ironton worked to attract other heavy industry to the region. Companies such as Allied Signal and Alpha Portland Cement did build in town. The region has had difficulty creating an alternate economy. By 2004, both Alpha Portland Cement and Allied Signal were gone, and Ironton had shrunk by nearly 30% from its peak population in 1950. (See US Census table below.)

=== Professional football and Thanksgiving Day football tradition ===
Ironton had one of the first professional football teams in the United States, called the Ironton Tanks. The team was organized in 1919 and played through 1930. The football field previously used by the Tanks is now home to the Ironton High School Football team, the Ironton Fighting Tigers.

The Tanks began what is now the National Football League's Thanksgiving Day Game tradition of the Detroit Lions. The Tanks played a game in 1920, the day after Thanksgiving, with the Lombards, a crosstown rival, winning 26–0. In 1922, they played and defeated the Huntington Boosters 12–0 on Thanksgiving Day, Nov 30. The Tanks continued playing on this national holiday each year through 1930, which was the Tanks' final season. Several Tanks players (including Glenn Presnell) continued their football careers by joining the nearby Portsmouth Spartans, which continued the annual tradition until their demise after the 1933 season.

The Spartans' assets were acquired by businessman G.A. Richards and moved to Detroit, where they were renamed the Lions. Asked by Richards about ways to improve ticket sales, the players replied that they always got a good turnout on Thanksgiving Day. He promptly scheduled the first Thanksgiving Day game in Detroit.

== Geography ==
According to the United States Census Bureau, the city has a total area of 4.46 square miles (11.55 km^{2}), of which 0.30 sq mi (0.78 km^{2}) is covered by water.

=== Climate ===
Ironton is located within the northern limits of a humid subtropical climate (Koppen Cfa), which is typical of southern Ohio and northern Kentucky. The region experiences four distinct seasons. Winters are cool to cold with mild periods, and summers are generally hot and humid, with significant precipitation year-round. Ironton is largely transitional in its flora, sharing traditionally northern trees in landscaping, such as the blue spruce along with magnolia and the occasional needle palm from the Upland South.

== Demographics ==
Historical population
Census	Pop.	Note	%±
1860	3,691		—
1870	5,686		54.1%
1880	8,857		55.8%
1890	10,939		23.5%
1900	11,868		8.5%
1910	13,147		10.8%
1920	14,007		6.5%
1930	16,021		14.4%
1940	15,851		−1.1%
1950	16,333		3.0%
1960	15,745		−3.6%
1970	15,030		−4.5%
1980	14,178		−5.7%
1990	12,751		−10.1%
2000	11,211		−12.1%
2010	11,129		−0.7%
2020	10,571		−5.0%
2025 (est.)	10,148		−4.0%

=== 2020 census ===
As of the 2020 census, Ironton had a population of 10,571. The median age was 43.5 years. 21.3% of residents were under the age of 18 and 22.1% of residents were 65 years of age or older. For every 100 females there were 89.6 males, and for every 100 females age 18 and over there were 86.1 males age 18 and over.

99.3% of residents lived in urban areas, while 0.7% lived in rural areas.

There were 4,532 households in Ironton, of which 25.5% had children under the age of 18 living in them. Of all households, 36.5% were married-couple households, 19.6% were households with a male householder and no spouse or partner present, and 37.3% were households with a female householder and no spouse or partner present. About 36.4% of all households were made up of individuals and 18.4% had someone living alone who was 65 years of age or older.

There were 5,120 housing units, of which 11.5% were vacant. The homeowner vacancy rate was 3.3% and the rental vacancy rate was 6.0%.

Racial composition as of the 2020 census
Race	Number	Percent
White	9,584	90.7%
Black or African American	404	3.8%
American Indian and Alaska Native	29	0.3%
Asian	45	0.4%
Native Hawaiian and Other Pacific Islander	1	0.0%
Some other race	75	0.7%
Two or more races	433	4.1%
Hispanic or Latino (of any race)	103	1.0%

=== 2010 census ===
As of the 2010 census, 11,129 people, 4,817 households, and 2,882 families resided in the city. The population density was 2,675.2 inhabitants per square mile (1,032.9/km^{2}). The 5,382 housing units had an average density of 1,293.8 per square mile (499.5/km^{2}). The racial makeup of the city was 92.6% White, 4.7% African American, 0.2% Native American, 0.3% Asian, 0.1% from other races, and 2.1% from two or more races. Hispanics or Latinos of any race were 0.5% of the population.

Of the 4,817 households, 28.1% had children under 18 living with them, 39.0% were married couples living together, 15.3% had a female householder with no husband present, 5.5% had a male householder with no wife present, and 40.2% were not families. About 35.9% of all households were made up of individuals, and 16.2% had someone living alone who was 65 or older. The average household size was 2.23, and the average family size was 2.87.

The median age in the city was 42.1 years. The city's age distribution was 21.1% under 18, 8.6% from 18 to 24, 23.8% from 25 to 44, 27.1% from 45 to 64, and 19.2% were 65 or older. The gender makeup of the city was 47.1% male and 52.9% female.

=== 2000 census ===
As of the 2000 census, 11,211 people, 4,906 households, and 3,022 families lived in the city. The population density was 2,711.3 inhabitants per square mile (1,046.8/km^{2}). The 5,507 housing units had an average density of 1,331.8 per square mile (514.2/km^{2}). The racial makeup of the city was 93.33% White, 5.24% African American, 0.09% Native American, 0.25% Asian, 0.02% Pacific Islander, 0.09% from other races, and 0.99% from two or more races. spanic Hispanics or Latinos of any race were 0.51% of the population.

Of the 4,906 households, 25.9% had children under 18 living with them, 43.6% were married couples living together, 14.3% had a female householder with no husband present, and 38.4% were not families. About 35.3% of all households were made up of individuals, and 18.0% had someone living alone who was 65 or older. The average household size was 2.22, and the average family size was 2.85.

In the city, the age distribution was 21.8% under 18, 7.9% from 18 to 24, 24.6% from 25 to 44, 24.5% from 45 to 64, and 21.2% who were 65 or older. The median age was 42 years. For every 100 females, there were 82.2 males. For every 100 females 18 and over, there were 77.0 males.

The median income for a household in the city was $23,585, and for a family was $35,014. Males had a median income of $31,702 versus $24,190 for females. The per capita income for the city was $15,391. About 17.2% of families and 23.1% of the population were below the poverty line, including 32.4% of those under 18 and 17.0% of those 65 or over.

== Arts and culture ==
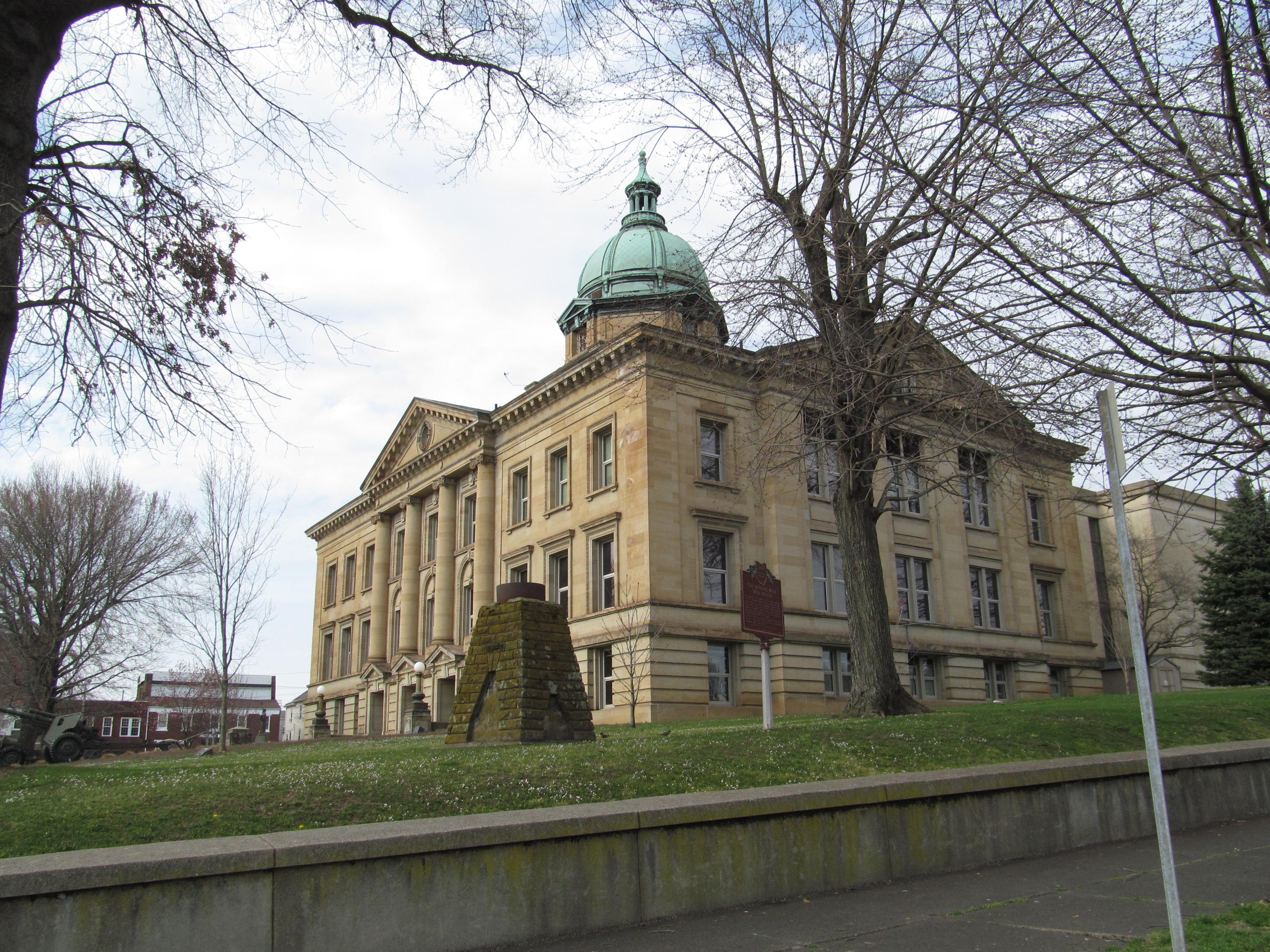
Lawrence County Courthouse

=== Library ===
Ironton has a public library, a branch of Briggs Lawrence County Public Library.

=== Downtown Historic District ===
The Downtown Ironton Historic District, listed on the National Register of Historic Places listings in Lawrence County, Ohio, includes Early Commercial architecture and Modern architecture representing periods from 1850 through 1974. The buildings include businesses, City Hall, financial institutions, meeting halls, United States Post Office buildings, professional service buildings, and railroad industry-related structures.

=== Memorial Day ===
Memorial Day events include Charity Fair, offering carnival games, crafts, inflatable rides, food, and musical acts. The Ironton-Lawrence County Memorial Day Parade, founded in 1868, is the United States' oldest continuously running Memorial Day parade.

== Government ==
The city is managed by a seven-member city council, the current members of which include Chairman Craig Harvey, Chris Perry, Nate Kline, Bob Cleary, Chris Haney, Robbie Brown, and Jacob Hock. Former mayor Katrina Keith was defeated in the November 2019 election by a total of 2,082 votes to 827 votes, but filed suit claiming that the winner of the election, Sam Cramblit, was not qualified to hold office in the city under state law; the suit was dismissed by the Ohio Supreme Court in late November 2019.

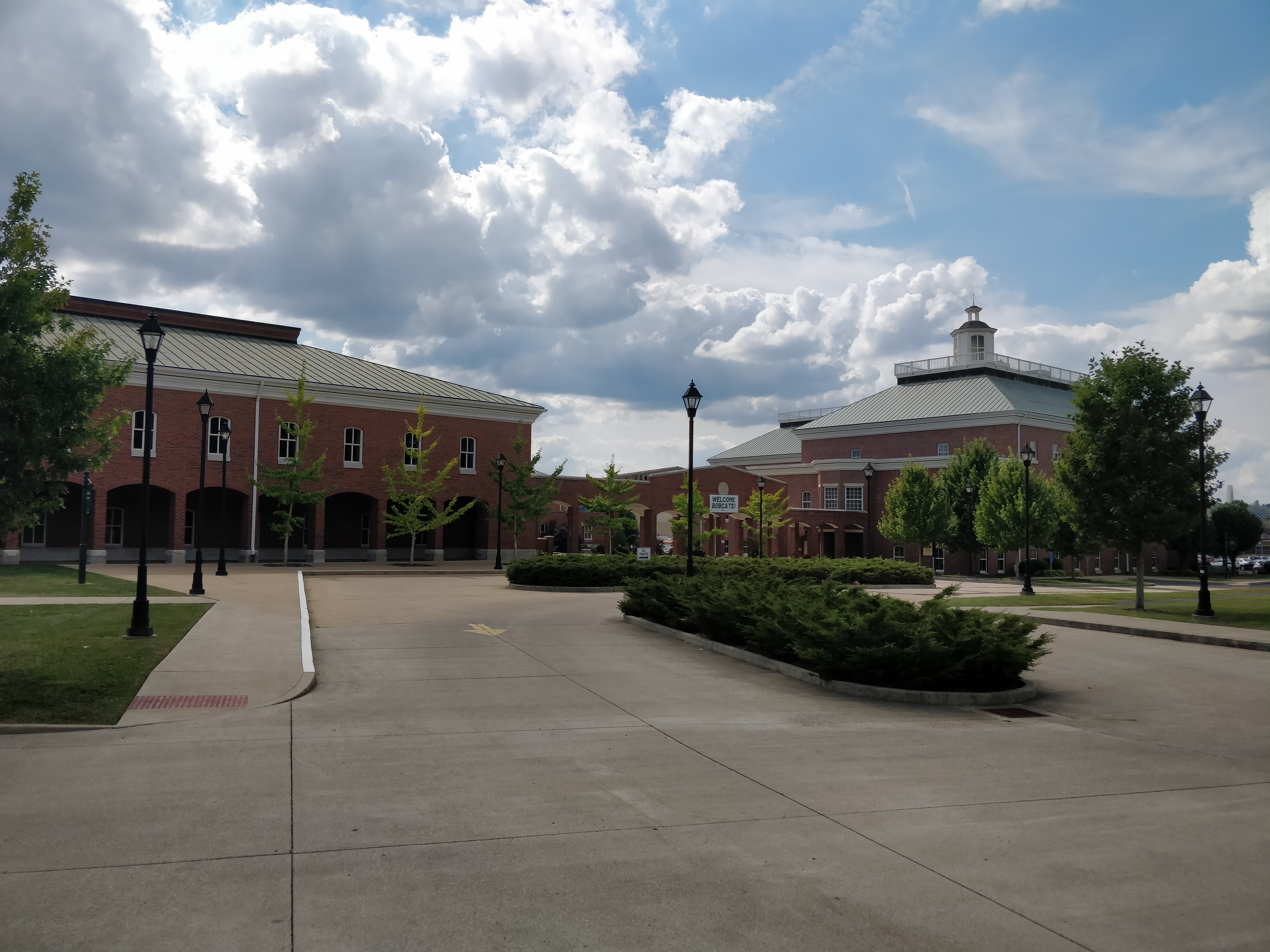
Ohio University Southern Campus

== Education ==
Public education in Ironton is provided by the Ironton City School District. This includes Ironton High School (grades 9-12), Ironton Middle School (grades 6-8), and Ironton Elementary School (kindergarten - grade 5).

Private education includes Saint Joseph Central High School and Saint Lawrence Central Elementary School.

Ohio University Southern Campus, the largest branch of Ohio University, is based in Ironton.

== Healthcare ==
In 2012, St. Mary's Medical Center in Huntington, West Virginia, opened a campus in Ironton that includes an emergency department, imaging service, laboratory services, ambulance service, and a helipad.
