= Rock Camp, Ohio =

Unincorporated community in Ohio, U.S.

Coordinates: 38°31′47″N 82°32′55″W

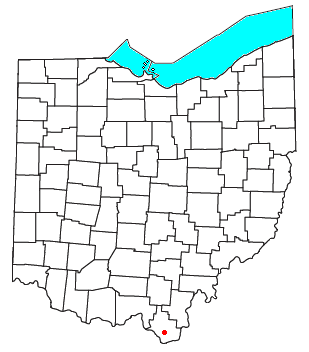
Location of Rock Camp, Ohio

Rock Camp is an unincorporated community in northeastern Perry Township, Lawrence County, Ohio, United States.
