= Washington Township, Lawrence County, Ohio =

Township in Ohio, US

- Township
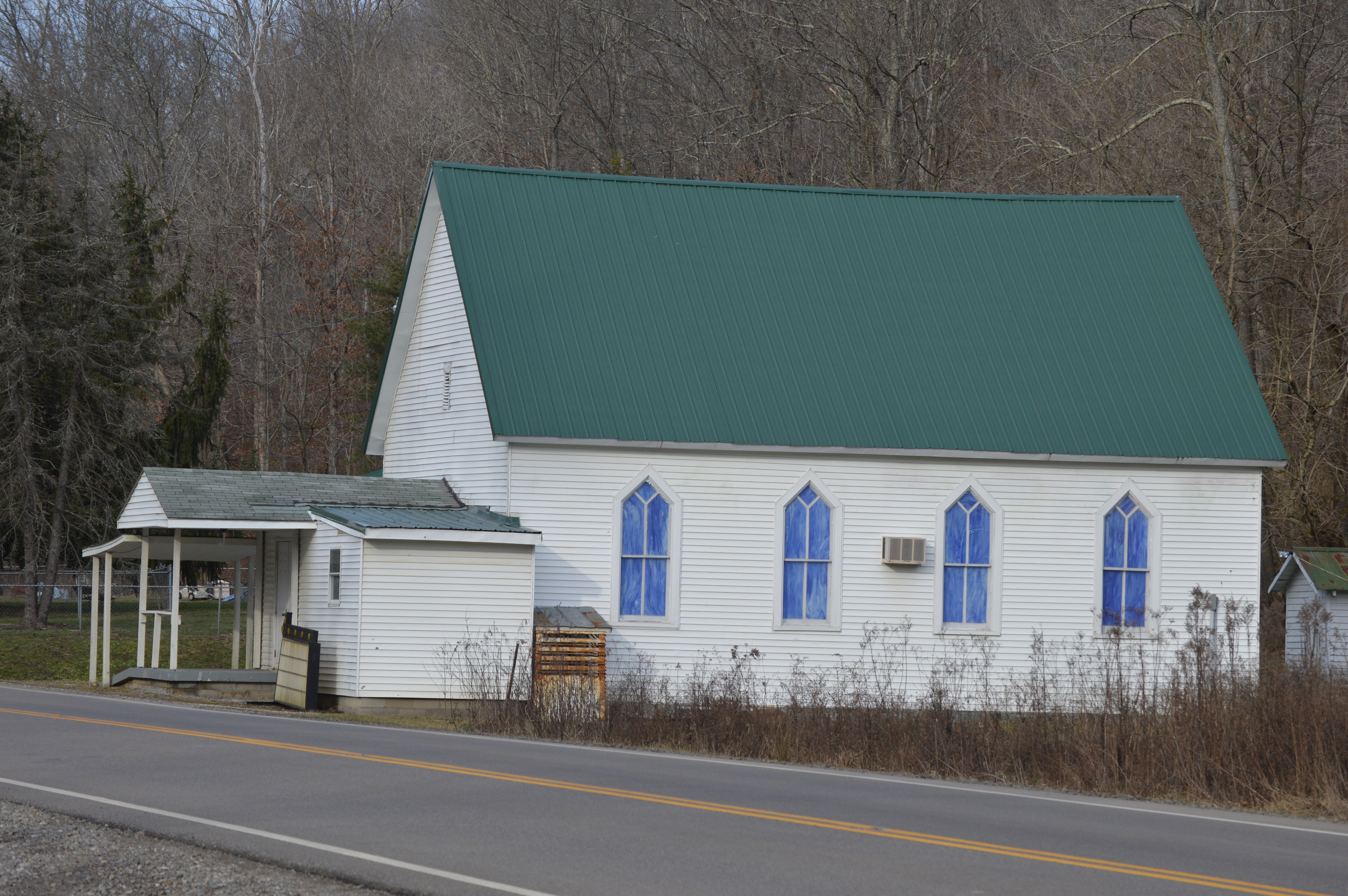
- Mount Olive Community Church on State Route 93

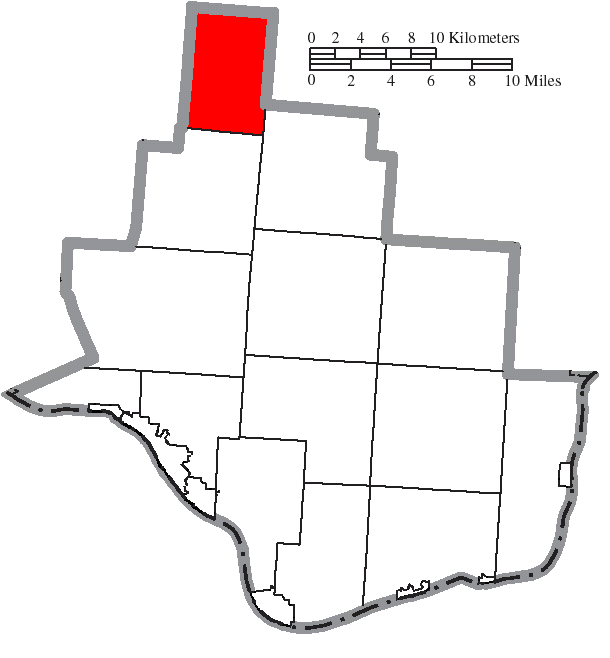
- Location of Washington Township in Lawrence County
- Coordinates: 38°50′3″N 82°37′41″W
- Country: United States
- State: Ohio
- County: Lawrence

Area
  - Total: 24.2 sq mi (62.8 km^{2})
  - Land: 24.2 sq mi (62.7 km^{2})
  - Water: 0.039 sq mi (0.1 km^{2})
- Elevation: 702 ft (214 m)

Population (2020)
  - Total: 174
  - Density: 7.19/sq mi (2.78/km^{2})
- Time zone: UTC-5 (Eastern (EST))
  - Summer (DST): UTC-4 (EDT)
- FIPS code: 39-81396
- GNIS feature ID: 1086450

Washington Township is one of the fourteen townships of Lawrence County, Ohio, United States. As of the 2020 census, the population was 174.

== Geography ==
Located in the far northern part of the county, it borders the following townships:

- Jefferson Township, Jackson County - north
- Greenfield Township, Gallia County - east
- Symmes Township - southeast
- Decatur Township - south
- Bloom Township, Scioto County - west

The unincorporated community of Firebrick is located in Washington Township.

== Name and history ==
It is one of forty-three Washington Townships statewide.

== Government ==
The township is governed by a three-member board of trustees, who are elected in November of odd-numbered years to serve a four-year term commencing on January 1 of the following year. Two are elected in the year following the presidential election and one is elected in the year before it. There is also an elected township fiscal officer, who serves a four-year term beginning on April 1 of the year after the election, which is held in November of the year before the presidential election. The remaining trustees filled the vacancies in the fiscal officership or on the board of trustees.

== Education ==
Washington Township's K-12 education services are primarily provided by the Oak Hill Union Local School District. A smaller portion of the township received services from the Rock Hill Local School District, which offers Pre-K through 12th grade.
