= Ironton Tanks =

Semi-professional American football team 1919-1930

Logo

General information
- Founded: 1919; 107 years ago
- Folded: 1930; 96 years ago
- Stadium: Beechwood Stadium (1919–1926); Tank Stadium (1926–1930)
- Headquartered: Ironton, Ohio, United States
- Colors: Scarlet Red, Gold, White

Personnel
- Head coach: Earle Louis "Greasy" Neale (1930)

Nicknames
- Big Red; The Big Red Machine

Team history
- Ironton Tanks (1919–1930)

League / conference affiliations
- Independent

The Ironton Tanks were a semi-professional football team organized in 1919 in Ironton, Ohio.

Their historical marker gives the story of the Tanks origin: "Semi-professional football began in Ironton in 1893 with a team known as the Irontonians. The Ironton Tanks, founded in 1919, was a combination of two Ironton cross-town rival football clubs known as the Irish Town Rags and the Lombards." Their name reflected both the town's deep roots in the iron industry and the desire of returning soldiers from World War I to run over their opponents.

== Historical significance ==
Based on their outstanding record of 85 wins, 19 losses, 14 ties, an undefeated season in 1922, a state championship in 1926 and dual victories in 1930 over National Football League (NFL) powerhouses the Chicago Bears and New York Giants, the Tanks have a strong claim to being the best team to not play in the NFL. This motto is reinforced on the wall of Tank Stadium, where the story of the stadium opening proclaims "When the Tanks Were Tops" (2nd picture in photo gallery below). Their unmatched achievements in 1930 are recorded in a Professional Football Researchers Association's report on the 1930 season when talking about non-NFL teams: "None, however, matched the Ironton (Ohio) Tanks' 1930 achievements."

Although the Ironton Tanks ceased operations after the 1930 season, they lived on. Over half of the Tanks moved on to other NFL teams; most, including Glenn Presnell stayed in Ironton and played for the Portsmouth Spartans (only 30 miles away) until they moved to Detroit in 1934, becoming the NFL team now known as the Detroit Lions. The combined team strength from the Tank infusion and the addition of rookie Dutch Clark, a future Hall of Famer, turned the Spartans into a power to be reckoned with. In 1932 the Spartans were among the best in the league but lost to the Chicago Bears in the first NFL playoff game, but after the next year in the depths of the depression, the Spartans too folded. Their assets were purchased to pay off debt and the team became the Detroit Lions in 1934. Without presence of the Tanks on the roster the Spartan record would have been less successful and likely not worth being bought and moved to become the Detroit Lions. So the forerunners of today's Lions were both the Tanks and Spartans.

== NFL Thanksgiving Day Game Tradition and transfer to the Detroit Lions ==
As with most football teams of the era, the Tanks regularly played games over Thanksgiving weekend. The Tanks played a game the day after Thanksgiving with the Lombards, a crosstown rival on Friday, Nov 26, 1920, winning 26-0 when many people were off due to the holiday. They began the actual string of Thanksgiving Day Games by defeating the Huntington Boosters 12–0 on Thursday, Nov 30, 1922. The Tanks continued playing on this national holiday each year through 1930, which was the Tanks final season. Several Tank players (including Glenn Presnell) continued their football careers by joining the nearby Portsmouth Spartans. They did not continue the annual tradition through their demise after the 1933 season. The Spartans assets were acquired and moved to Detroit where they were renamed the Lions. Asked by their new owner (G.A. Richards) about ways to improve ticket sales, the former Tanks players (led by Presnell) indicated that in the past (as Tanks) that they always got a good turnout on Thanksgiving Day. This led him to schedule the first Thanksgiving Day Game in Detroit (actually the 10th game of the series). One thing that made the first game in Detroit so notable was arranging NBC to broadcast the game nationally, reaching a larger audience and developing a national clamor for repeats in following years.

=== Local rivalries ===
Perhaps more important to Ironton residents at the time were the local rivalries with other cities in the Ohio area, particularly Portsmouth, where the local sentiment was summed up by this quote “ancient and hereditary foes”. Despite being a small town, only about 1/3 the size of Portsmouth, the Tanks are referred to by Carl Becker refers as the dominant team of the era, "In the 1920s, the "famous" Ironton Tanks were the sovereigns of semi-professional football in the upper Ohio Valley, indeed even in the state of Ohio". Other rivals were the Ashland Armcos, from across the river in Kentucky, Dayton Koors, several teams from Cincinnati, Columbus and Akron, but none appeared to have stirred the fans' passion as did the different Portsmouth teams that appeared between 1920 and 1930.

=== Earle Louis "Greasy" Neale ===
The most colorful figure to be associated with the Ironton Tanks was their legendary coach Earle Louis Neale, known as Greasy Neale. He is the only person to have coached in the Rose Bowl (1922), won the World Series (Reds vs White Sox, 1919) and won an NFL title (Philadelphia Eagles back to back 1948–49). Greasy insisted his Reds won the scandal-plagued 1919 "Black Sox" Series because of better pitching.

=== Glenn Presnell ===
The best player for the Tanks was Glenn Presnell. Besides leading the Tanks to victories over the Giants and Bears, guiding the Portsmouth Spartans to third place in the NFL regular season championship in 1932, he helped the Detroit Lions to their first NFL championship in 1935. Not only did he play both sides of the ball, Glenn Presnell held the NFL longest field goal record for 19 years, with a 54 yarder that beat the Green Bay Packers 3–0. He led the NFL in scoring in 1933 with 64 points from TDs, field goals and points after TDs. He graduated from the University of Nebraska as an All-American in 1928 with a bachelor's degree in Education and was honored with an Alumni award in 2003 at the age of 97. Glenn was inducted into the Nebraska High School Hall of Fame, citing his three Letters as a Cornhusker, leading the nation in total yards as a senior, All-Missouri Valley two times, and twice being NFL All-pro. He was inducted into the Nebraska Football Hall of Fame in 1973 and named 34th out of Nebraska's top 100 athletes. Interesting trivia is that his wife helped choose the famous powder blue uniforms for the Detroit Lions when the team moved from Portsmouth, Ohio. However, Glenn's memory is challenged by the Lions official site Outside this minor controversy, Glenn and the Lions seemed to have gotten along well. He posed with a football from "Your Friends at the Detroit Lions" crowning him the "LionKing". Many feel his NFL career itself deserved entry into the Pro Football Hall of Fame, while others have said he was unfairly discriminated against because of his years with the Tanks. An online petition to support his entry to the Football Hall of Fame, in nearby Canton, Ohio, has also attracted attention, Note: Glen has been referenced in several publications as being named an All-American while at Nebraska. In studying the Nebraska football media guide, no individual records other than participantion and team win–loss is recorded for that time frame. The Nebraska media guide does show All-American award winners, and Glenn is not shown as on that list. No effort has been made to confirm directly with any sports officials at the University of Nebraska if this is correct. Also the Wikipedia reference for All-American awards for Glenn's years at Nebraska does not show him being awarded the honor. Again, the total evidence confirming his status in unclear. As evidence of Glenn's outstanding career, it can be shown that his on the field performance both as a Tank, Spartan and Lion were exemplary and several other teams had shown interest in signing him upon the Tanks demise. Indeed, Glenns contributions and performance as a starting halfback and safety in his years with the Detroit Lions were key in their becoming 1935 World Champions. Glenn Presnell was honored by the Lions in 1995 at halftime against the Packers as a member of the 60th anniversary of the 1935 championship by being driven to the 50 yard line in a Ford Model T.

== Uniforms ==
The Tanks uniform was also noteworthy, a distinctive blend of khaki pants and red jerseys, reminiscent of the 49ers today. They were nicknamed Big Red and the Big Red Machine and appear to be the first team to sport this intimidating moniker.

== Reasons for success ==
- Recruiting: The Tanks found success against teams from much larger markets and the NFL primarily thanks to the leader of the early years Charlton "Shorty" Davies and Bill Brooks, his teammate at Ohio State. The early Tanks typically played without helmets and made fifty dollars a game but sometimes were not paid (F.C. "Dutch" McCarthy, private conversation). However, it was not until local businessman Nick McMahon became the manager of the Tanks that they were able to attract top players by providing coaching and teaching jobs in the surrounding areas. Nick McMahon attracted All American Glenn Presnell from Nebraska to Ironton in 1928. Glenn Presnell taught science at Ironton High School and coached at Russell, KY. Charlton "Shorty" Davies coached at Ironton High School. Other Tanks taught or coached at Hanging Rock, Pedro, Blackfork, South Point, Chesapeake, Coal Grove, Proctorville, Rome and Raceland. In 1930, Nick McMahon recruited Hall of Fame Coach Earle "Greasy" Neal to coach the Tanks.
- Offensive strategy: Although the Tanks operated out of the standard formation of the day, the single wing, they were able to use the pass, in part because of Presnell's threat to run from the tailback position. He credited his superior speed more than quick cuts. The ball was more round than today, which made a passing game even more difficult. Still the Tanks were able to innovate with "looping and angle charges still being used today by teams of the National Football League".

== Preserving the Tank legend ==
The town of Ironton has maintained the legend of these proud footballers by designating the stadium with historical status and creating a fund for its maintenance in addition to a Tribute website with their complete schedule and results. Ironton native Dave Berry wrote a song in tribute to the professional football played in the region.

== Tank Memorial Stadium ==
The Ironton Tanks originally played in Beechwood Stadium but following through on local enthusiasm a stadium fund was created and Tank Stadium was built in 1926. This stadium still stands today and is being used by Ironton High School. It is one of the last covered stadiums in use for high school football today. The stadium was later renamed Tanks Memorial Stadium, the name in use to the present day. In 2009, the field at Tanks Memorial Stadium was given the additional name of Bob Lutz Field in honor of long-time Ironton head coach Bob Lutz. During the summer of 2014, Tank Memorial Stadium's playing surface was upgraded to Field Turf.

== Schedule and results by year ==
=== 1919 ===
Game	Date	Day	Opponent	Result	Record
1	November 4	Tuesday	New Boston Tigers	W 9–0	1–0
2	November 11	Tuesday	Ashland Playhouse	L 0–7	1–1
3	November 18	Tuesday	Ashland Playhouse	T 0–0	1–1–1
4	November 25	Tuesday	Portsmouth N & W	W 12–0	2–1–1

=== 1920 ===
Game	Date	Day	Opponent	Result	Record
1	October 10	Sunday	Morris Harvey	L 0–14	0–1
2	October 24	Sunday	Smoke House	T 6–6	0–1–1
3	November 6	Saturday	Marshall	W 13–0	1–1–1
4	November 8	Monday	New Boston Tigers	W 77–0	2–1–1
5	November 15	Monday	Nitro	W 13–0	3–1–1
6	November 26	Friday	Lombards	W 26–0	4–1–1
7	November 29	Monday	Smoke House	W 14–0	5–1–1

=== 1921 ===
Game	Date	Day	Opponent	Result	Record
1	October 3	Sunday	Jackson Bearcats	W 6–0	1–0
2	October 16	Sunday	Charleston Westside	W 34–0	2–0
3	October 23	Sunday	Ashland Tigers	W 7–0	3–0
4	October 30	Sunday	Smoke House	T 0–0	3–0–1
5	November 13	Sunday	Lombards	W 21–7	4–0–1
6	November 20	Sunday	Smoke House	W 14–0	5–0–1
7	November 27	Sunday	Wellston Eagles	T 0–0	5–0–2
8	December 4	Sunday	Morris Harvey	W 19–14	6–0–2
9	December 11	Sunday	Wellston Eagles	W 7–6	7–0–2

=== 1922 ===
Game	Date	Day	Opponent	Result	Record
1	October 1	Sunday	Columbus Olympians	W 13–6	1–0
2	October 8	Sunday	Athens	W 19–0	2–0
3	October 15	Sunday	Huntington Boosters	W 18–7	3–0
4	October 22	Sunday	Williamson	W 76–0	4–0
5	October 29	Sunday	Jackson Bearcats	W 40–0	5–0
6	November 5	Sunday	Huntington Boosters	T 7–7	5–0–1
7	November 12	Sunday	Lancaster	W 38–0	6–0–1
8	November 26	Sunday	Washington Ct. House	W 45–0	7–0–1
9	November 30	Thursday (Thanksgiving)	Huntington Boosters	W 12–10	8–0–1

=== 1923 ===
Game	Date	Day	Opponent	Result	Record
1	September 30	Sunday	Ironton Eagles	W 46–0	1–0
2	October 7	Sunday	Columbus Seagraves	W 18–0	2–0
3	October 14	Sunday	Columbus Westside	W 7–6	3–0
4	October 21	Sunday	Portsmouth Smoke House	40–0	4–0
5	October 28	Sunday	Huntington Boosters	W 7–0	5–0
6	November 4	Sunday	Logan Wildcats	W 7–0	6–0
7	November 11	Sunday	Huntington Boosters	L 6–12	6–1
8	November 18	Sunday	Cincinnati Saints	W 31–0	7–1
9	November 25	Sunday	Portsmouth Smoke House	W 21–6	8–1
10	November 29	Thursday (Thanksgiving Day)	Cincinnati Harrisons	W 20–0	9–1
11	December 9	Sunday	Huntington Boosters	W 26–0	10–1

=== 1924 ===
Game	Date	Day	Opponent	Result	Record
1	September 21	Sunday	Ironton Panthers	W 38–0	1–0
2	September 28	Sunday	Columbus JungleImps	W 25–6	2–0
3	October 5	Sunday	Murray City Tigers	W 7–0	3–0
4	October 12	Sunday	Louisville Brecks	W 31–0	4–0
5	October 19	Sunday	Cincinnati Potters	W 14–3	5–0
6	October 26	Sunday	Akron Silents	W 19–0	6–0
7	November 2	Sunday	Huntington Boosters	W 6–0	7–0
8	November 9	Sunday	Smoke House	W 44–0	8–0
9	November 16	Sunday	Cincinnati Potters	W 7–3	9–0
10	November 23	Sunday	Covington C.A.C	W 12–0	10–0
11	November 27	Thursday (Thanksgiving)	Huntington Boosters	W 21–0	11–0
12	November 29	Saturday	Smoke House	T 0–0	11–0–1

=== 1925 ===
Game	Date	Day	Opponent	Result	Record
1	September 27	Sunday	Chillicothe	W 29–0	1–0
2	October 4	Sunday	Columbus Bobbs	W 35–0	2–0
3	October 11	Sunday	Cincinnati Potters	W 15–6	3–0
4	October 18	Sunday	Ashland Armcos	W 21–6	4–0
5	October 25	Sunday	Huntington Boosters	W 12–0	5–0
6	November 1	Sunday	Columbus Wagner Pirates	W 19–5	6–0
7	November 8	Sunday	Ashland Armcos	W 9–0	7–0
8	November 15	Sunday	Huntington Boosters	T 0–0	7–0–1
9	November 22	Sunday	Dayton Koors	T 7–7	7–0–2
10	November 26	Thursday (Thanksgiving)	Canton Bulldogs	L 0–12	7–1–2
11	November 29	Sunday	Cincinnati Potters	W 9–0	8–1–2
12	December 14	Monday	Dayton Koors	W 24–6	9–1–2

=== 1926 ===
Game	Date	Day	Opponent	Result	Record
1	September 19	Sunday	Columbus All Stars	W 27–0	1–0
2	September 26	Sunday	Middletown Armcos	W 27–0	2–0
3	October 3	Sunday	Columbus Wagner Pirates	W 39–0	3–0
4	October 10	Sunday	Dayton Koors	W 23–0	4–0
5	October 17	Sunday	Cleveland Indians	W 47–0	5–0
6	October 24	Sunday	Ashland Armcos	W 2–0	6–0
7	October 31	Sunday	Akron Silents	W 27–0	7–0
8	November 7	Sunday	Portsmouth Presidents	W 9–0	8–0
9	November 14	Sunday	Kokomo American Legion	W 15–0	9–0
10	November 21	Sunday	Ashland Armcos	W 7–0	10–0
11	November 25	Thursday (Thanksgiving)	Kansas City Cowboys	T 0–0	10–0–1
12	October 28	Sunday	Cincinnati Potters	L 0–28	10–1–1
13	December 5	Sunday	Portsmouth Presidents	W 33–0	11–1–1

=== 1927 ===
Game	Date	Day	Opponent	Result	Record
1	September 18	Sunday	Columbus Bobbs	W 7–0	1–0
2	September 25	Sunday	Middletown Armcos	L 0–7	1–1
3	October 2	Sunday	Toledo Boosters	W 25–7	2–1
4	October 16	Sunday	Shelby Blues	W 14–0	3–1
5	October 23	Sunday	Ashland Armcos	T 0–0	3–1–1
6	October 30	Sunday	Akron Indians	W 27–0	4–1–1
7	November 6	Sunday	Portsmouth Shoe Steels	W 18–0	5–1–1
8	November 13	Sunday	Ashland Armcos	T 7–7	5–1–2
9	November 20	Sunday	Portsmouth Shoe Steels	L 0–7	5–2–2
10	November 24	Thursday (Thanksgiving)	Middletown Armcos	L 0–8	5–3–2
11	November 27	Sunday	Logan Wildcats	W 14–0	6–3–2

=== 1928 ===
Game	Date	Day	Opponent	Result	Record
1	September 30	Sunday	Columbus Bobbs	W 52–0	1–0
2	October 7	Sunday	Cleveland Panthers	W 47–0	2–0
3	October 14	Sunday	Akron Awnings	T 0–0	2–0–1
4	October 21	Sunday	Portsmouth Spartans	T 0–0	2–0–2
5	October 28	Sunday	Ashland Armcos	L 6–7	2–1–2
6	November 4	Sunday	Cincinnati Guards	W 7–0	3–1–2
7	November 11	Sunday	Portsmouth Spartans	T 0–0	3–1–3
8	November 18	Sunday	Middletown Armcos	W 13–0	4–1–3
9	November 25	Sunday	Ashland Armcos	W 3–0	5–1–3
10	November 29	Thursday (Thanksgiving)	Akron Awnings	W 19–0	6–1–3
11	December 9	Sunday	Portsmouth Spartans	W 14–0	7–1–3

=== 1929 ===
Game	Date	Day	Opponent	Result	Record
1	September 22	Sunday	Columbus Medal Tailers	W 39–0	1–0
2	September 29	Sunday	Chillicothe Eagles	W 6–0	2–0
3	October 6	Sunday	Toledo Boosters	W 78–0	3–0
4	October 13	Sunday	Portsmouth Spartans	W 3–0	4–0
5	October 20	Sunday	Ashland Armcos	L 2–7	4–1
6	October 27	Sunday	Akron Awnings	W 7–5	5–1
7	November 3	Sunday	Portsmouth Spartans	L 0–20	5–2
8	November 10	Sunday	Cincinnati Guards	L 0–5	5–3
9	November 17	Sunday	Ashland Armcos	L 0–7	5–4
10	November 24	Sunday	Portsmouth Spartans	L 0–38	5–5
11	November 28	Thursday (Thanksgiving)	Akron Awnings	L 3–7	5–6

=== 1930 ===
Game	Date	Day	Opponent	Result	Record
1	September 28	Sunday	Portsmouth Spartans (NFL)	L 6–7	0–1
2	October 5	Sunday	Chillicothe Eagles	W 14–0	1–1
3	October 12	Sunday	Akron Awnings	W 3–0	2–1
4	October 15	Wednesday	Portsmouth Spartans (NFL)	W 16–15	3–1
5	October 26	Sunday	Polish-American Athletic Club of Washington	W 70–0	4–1
6	November 2	Sunday	Memphis Tigers	L 0–7	4–2
7	November 11	Tuesday	New York Giants (NFL)	W 13–12	5–2
8	November 16	Sunday	Akron Awnings	W 13–0	6–2
9	November 23	Sunday	Chicago Bears (NFL)	W 26–13	7–2
10	November 27	Thursday (Thanksgiving)	Portsmouth Spartans (NFL)	L 0–12	7–3

== Photo gallery ==
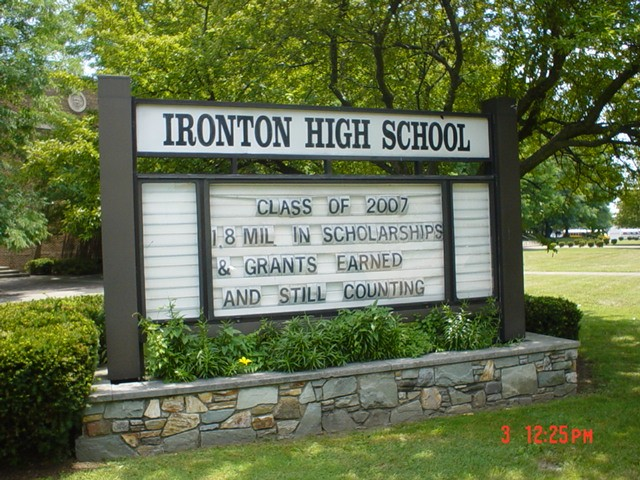
Ironton High School, the site of Tank Stadium

Greatest Wins

Stadium Opening

1922 and 1926 Tanks picture on Stadium Wall

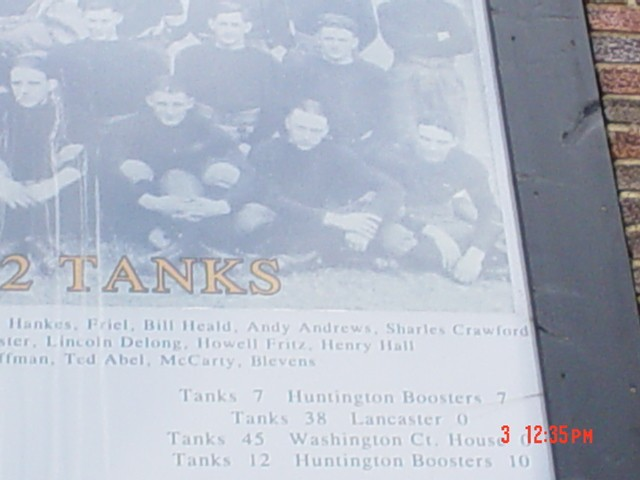
Closeup of 1922 Tanks on Stadium Wall

Newspaper Clipping of 1922 Tanks from Ironton Public Library (Dutch McCarty's surname was changed to McCarthy and is listed this way in some versions)

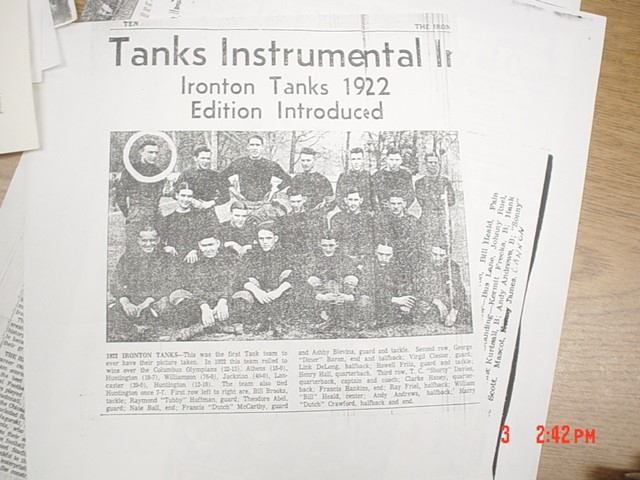
Newspaper Clipping of the 1st Team Picture, 1922 Tanks, from Ironton Public Library (wide view)

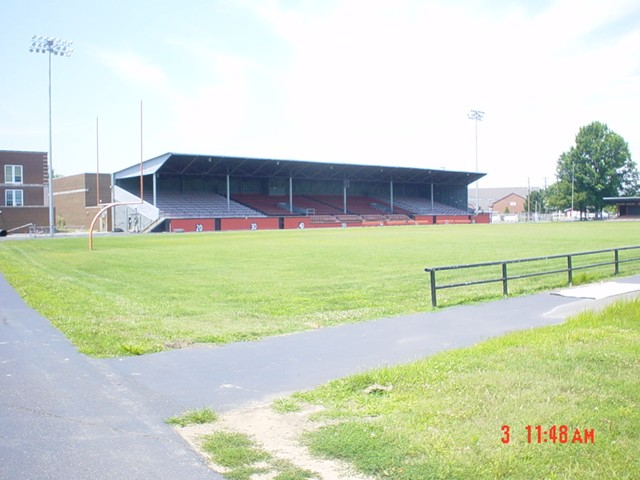
Tank Stadium (wide view)

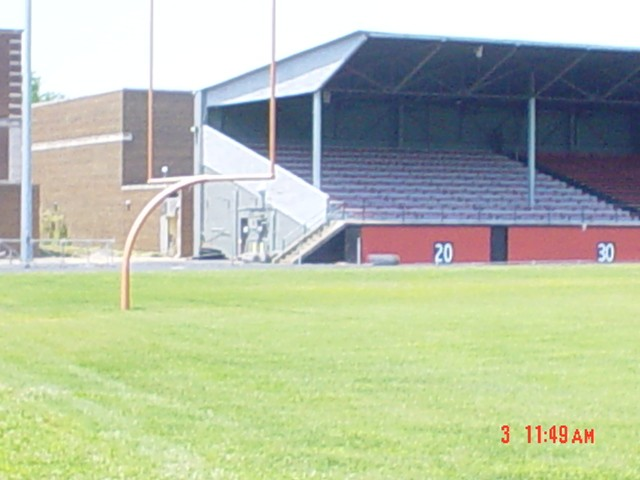
Tank Stadium Bleachers (view from visitors side)

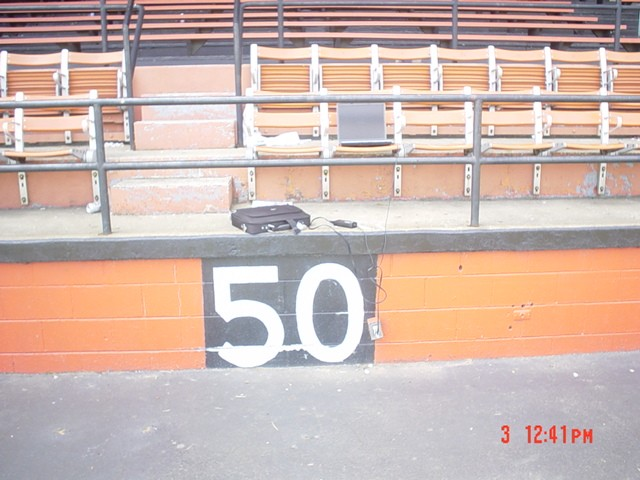
50 Yard Line at Tank Stadium

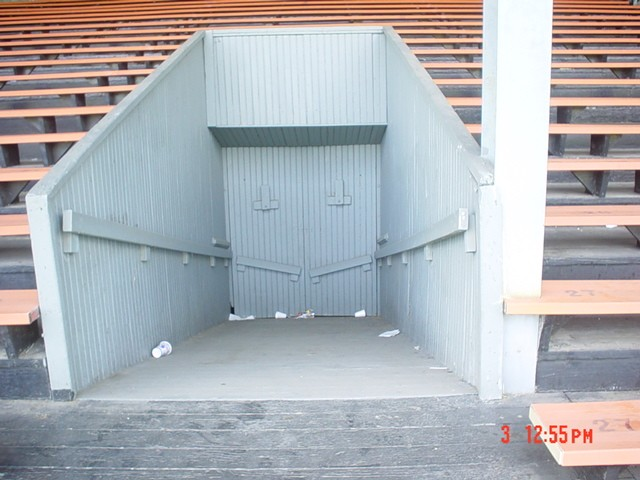
Tunnel from the Locker Room

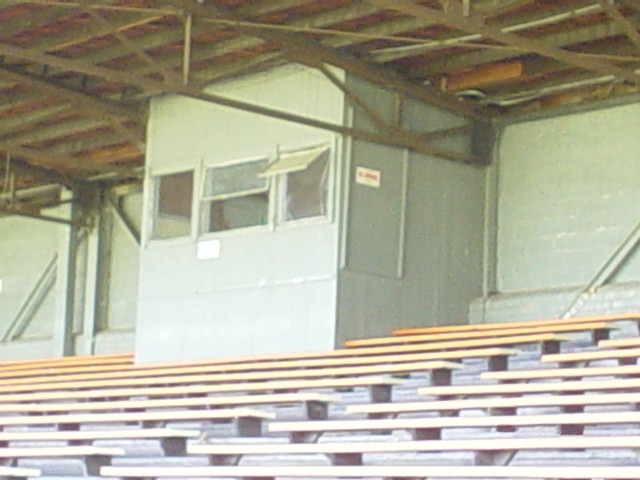
Original Press Box on Covered Side

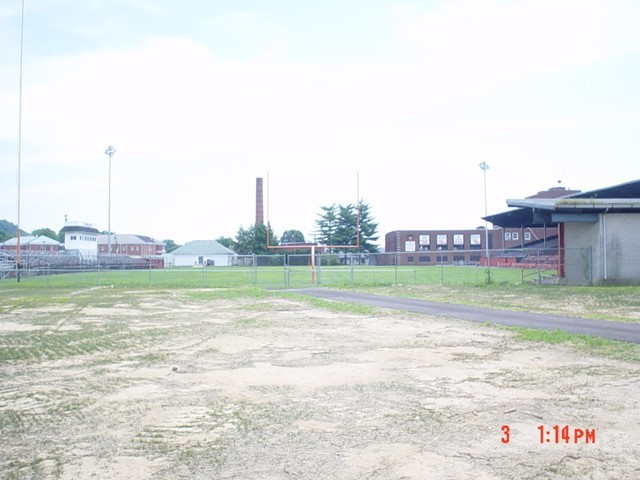
Goal to Goal View of Tank Stadium

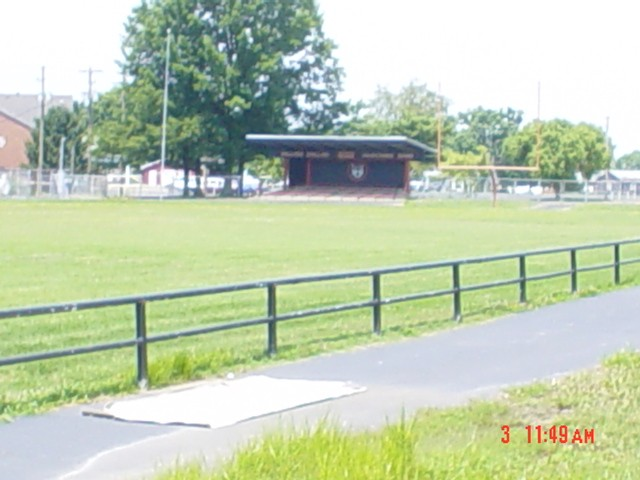
Ralph L Falls Band Shelter at Tank Stadium

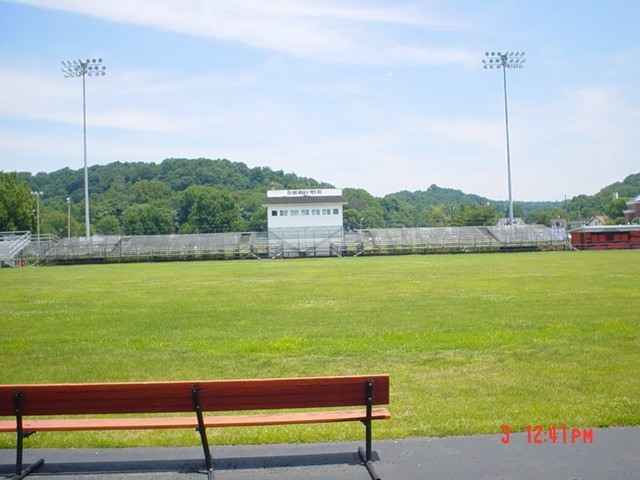
Press Box and Visitor's Bleachers at Tank Stadium (exposed to weather!)

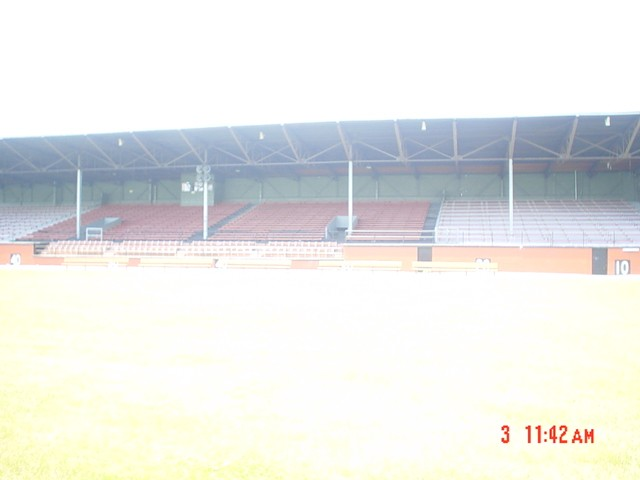
Tank Stadium Bleachers; Home Side

The Tanks Historical Marker (side 1) from the Ohio Historical Society at Ironton High School

The Tanks Historical Marker (side 2) from the Ohio Historical Society at Ironton High School
