= Fairland =

Fairland may refer to:

- Fairland, Illinois, United States
- Fairland, Indiana, United States
- Fairland, Maryland, United States
- Fairland, Oklahoma, United States
- Fairland, Roanoke, Virginia, United States
- Fairland, Gauteng, a suburb of Johannesburg, South Africa
- Fairland (ship), a Sitmar Cruises vessel

== People with the surname ==
- Thomas Fairland (1804–1852), English lithographer, engraver and portrait painter

== Schools ==
- Fairland High School (Proctorville, Ohio)
- Fairland Local School District in Ohio
- Fairlands Middle School in Cheddar, Somerset

== See also ==
- Fairlands, Surrey, England
