= Jerry Fields =

American football player (1938–2019)

- Fields with the Montreal Alouettes

No. 64, 15
- Positions: Linebacker, quarterback

Personal information
- Born: May 24, 1938; Ironton, Ohio, U.S.
- Died: March 30, 2019 (aged 80); South Point, Ohio, U.S.
- Listed height: 6 ft 1 in (1.85 m)
- Listed weight: 222 lb (101 kg)

Career information
- High school: Dawson-Bryant (Coal Grove, Ohio)
- College: Ohio State
- NFL draft: 1961: 13th round, 179th overall pick

Career history
- Dayton Triangles (1960); New York Giants (1961)*; New York Titans (1961–1962); New York Jets (1963)*; Montreal Alouettes (1963–1964)
- * Offseason or practice squad member only

Awards and highlights
- National champion (1957)

Career AFL statistics
- Sacks: 1
- Stats at Pro Football Reference

Jerry Eugene Fields (May 24, 1938 – March 30, 2019) was an American professional football player who was a linebacker for the New York Titans of the American Football League (AFL) and the Montreal Alouettes of the Canadian Football League (CFL). He played college football for the Ohio State Buckeyes as a quarterback.

== Early life ==
Jerry Eugene Fields was born on May 24, 1938, in Ironton, Ohio. He played high school football at Dawson-Bryant High School in Coal Grove, Ohio. He earned all-county honors in 1953 and all-state honors in both 1954 and 1955. Fields helped Dawson-Bryant win their first Ohio Valley Conference title in 1954. He led the school on a 20-game winning streak as starting quarterback. He graduated in 1956.

== College career ==
Fields accepted an athletic scholarship to play college football at Ohio State University. He was moved to center/linebacker at Ohio State due to his defensive ability. He was on the freshman team in 1956. He missed most of the 1957 season due to injury, thus the NCAA did not count his participation that year. Fields was a two-year letterman for the Buckeyes from 1958 to 1959. Fields was also the second-string quarterback and took over as starter for a few games his sophomore year in 1958 after Frank Kremblas suffered some injuries. Fields completed nine of 18 passes (50.0%) for 171 yards, one touchdown, and one interception that year while also rushing for 30 yards and one touchdown. Fields began the 1959 season as the starting quarterback but was later replaced by Tom Matte. Fields returned as starter after Matte suffered an injury. Overall in 1959, Fields completed 20 of 53 passes (37.7%) for 260 yards, one touchdown, and six interceptions while rushing for 156 yards. He was ruled ineligible before the start of the 1960 season after he failed a fine arts class in summer school.

== Professional career ==
Fields played quarterback for the Dayton Triangles of the American Football Conference in 1960. He was selected by the New York Giants in the 13th round, with the 179th overall pick, of the 1961 NFL draft as a linebacker. He was released on August 20, 1961.

Fields signed with the New York Titans of the American Football League on November 15, 1961. He played in five games for the Titans during the 1961 season and returned one kick for 19 yards. He appeared in all 14 games, starting seven, in 1962 and posted one sack. Fields became a free agent after the 1962 season and signed with the newly-renamed New York Jets on June 12, 1963. He was released on September 10, 1963.

Fields was signed by the Montreal Alouettes of the Canadian Football League on October 30, 1963, after linebacker Jim Reynolds suffered torn knee ligaments. Fields then played in the final regular season game for Montreal during the 1963 season. He also played in the team's playoff loss to the Ottawa Rough Riders. Fields played left corner linebacker, fullback, and second-string quarterback during the 1964 season. He played in 13 games overall in 1964, totaling one incomplete pass, 18 rushing attempts for 78 yards, and three receptions for 28 yards and one touchdown. The Alouettes finished the year with a 6–8 record and lost in the Eastern semifinal to the Rough Riders. On July 5, 1965, it was reported that Fields had retired due to a new house and a new job.

== Personal life ==
Fields died on March 30, 2019, at his home in South Point, Ohio.
