= Ironton High School =

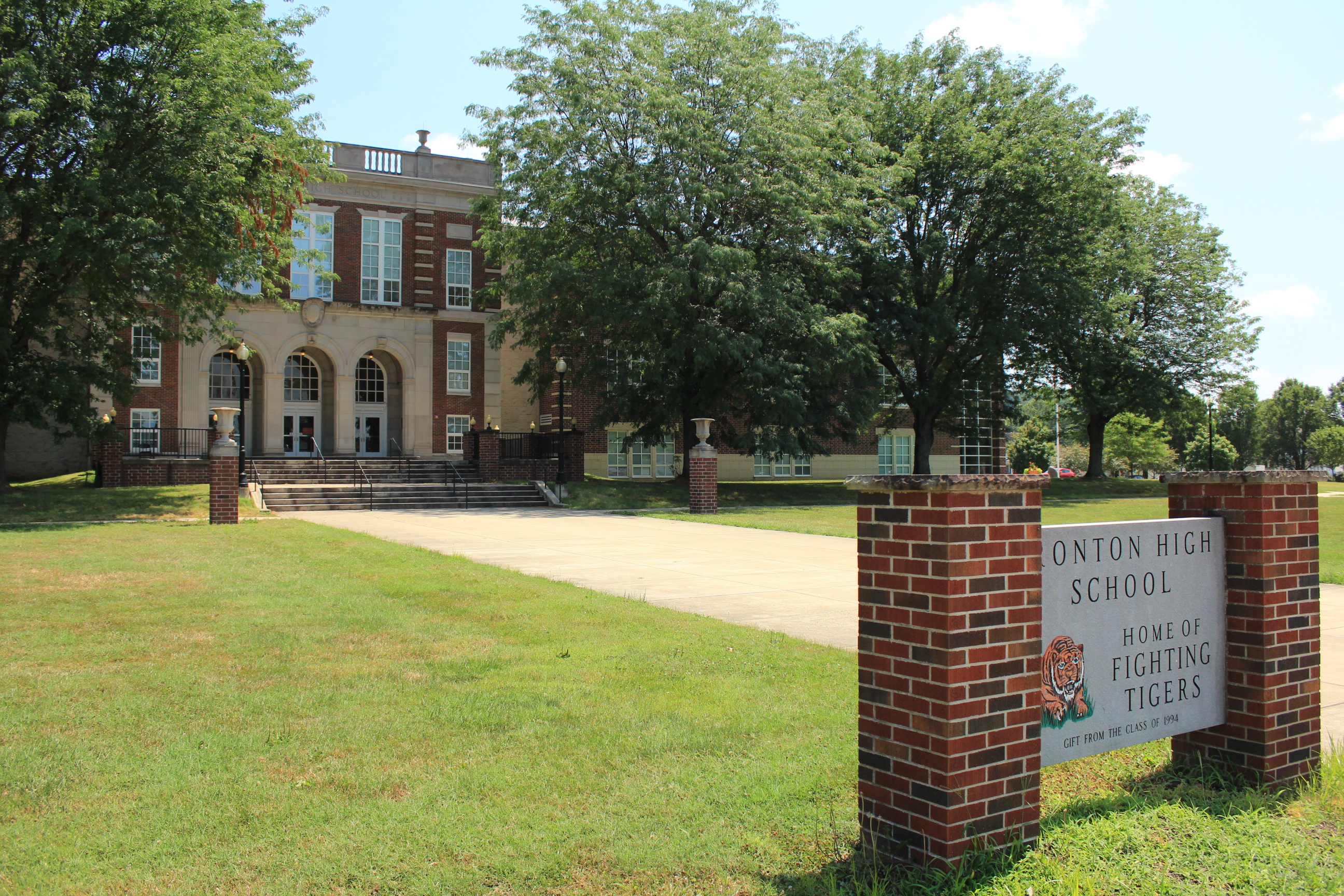

Location
- 1701 South 7th Street; Ironton, Ohio 45638; United States; 38°31′28″N 82°40′11″W

Information
- Type: Public high school
- School district: Ironton City Schools
- Superintendent: Sommer McCorkle
- Principal: Jeff Hairston
- Staff: 21.00 (FTE)
- Grades: 9-12
- Enrollment: 418 (2023–2024)
- Student to teacher ratio: 19.90
- Colors: Orange and black
- Fight song: Men of Ironton
- Athletics conference: Ohio Valley Conference
- Sports: Tennis, Football, Basketball, Softball, Baseball, Bowling, Golf, Cross Country, Track and Field, Volleyball, Wrestling, Cheerleading, Swimming
- Nickname: Fighting Tigers
- Rivals: Portsmouth Trojans, Ashland Tomcats, Wheelersburg Pirates
- Accreditation: Blue Ribbon 2014
- Website: www.tigertown.com

Ironton High School (IHS) is a public high school in Ironton, Ohio, United States. It is the only public high school in the Ironton City School District.

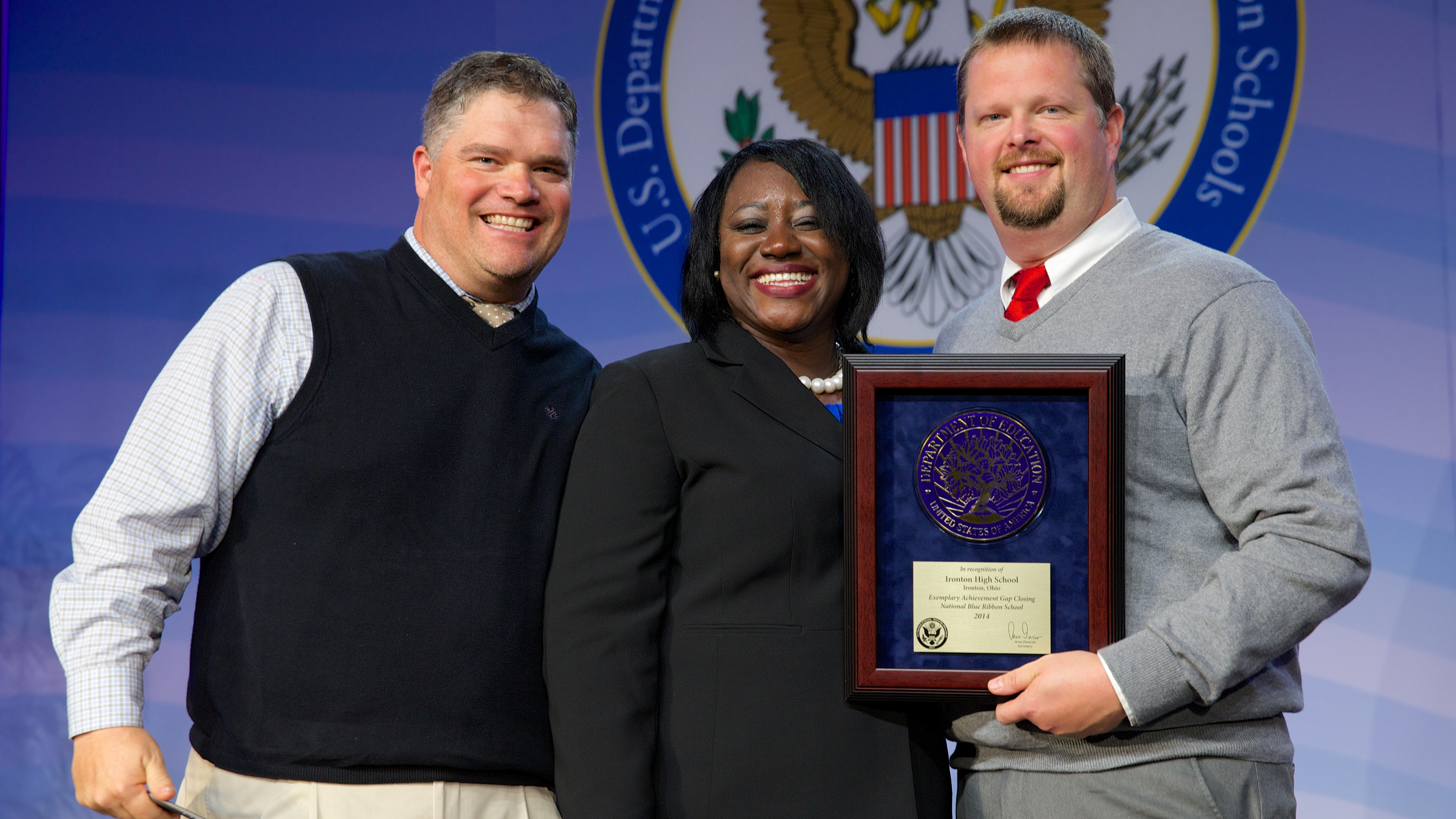
2014 National Blue Ribbon Schools Winner

== Athletics ==
The Ironton Fighting Tigers are a member of the Ohio Valley Conference (excluding football). Currently, the other members of the conference include Chesapeake High School (Panthers), Coal Grove High School (Hornets), Fairland High School (Dragons), South Point High School (Pointers), Rock Hill High School (Redmen), Portsmouth High School (Trojans), Gallia Academy High School (Blue Devils).

=== Ohio High School Athletic Association State Championships ===
- Boys Football – 1979, 1989, 2024
- Boys Baseball – 1972
- Boys Golf – 1995, 1996, 1997

See also Ohio High School Athletic Conferences

=== Football ===
The Ironton Football team was coached by Bob Lutz prior to 2012. Lutz set an Ohio high school football record with 381 career wins and guided the team to State Championship victories in 1979 and 1989. During Trevon Pendleton's first five seasons as head coach, the team reached the State Championship game in 2019, 2020, and 2022, but ultimately fell short. In 2024, the Fighting Tigers brought home a State Championship trophy for the third time in the program's history.

== Notable alumni ==
- Coy Bacon, former NFL player
- Richard Brown, attorney
- Reid Carrico, NFL linebacker for the Cleveland Browns
- George McAfee, former NFL player, member of Pro Football Hall of Fame.
- Clint McElroy, radio personality and podcaster
