= Dawson-Bryant High School =

Public school in Ohio, United States

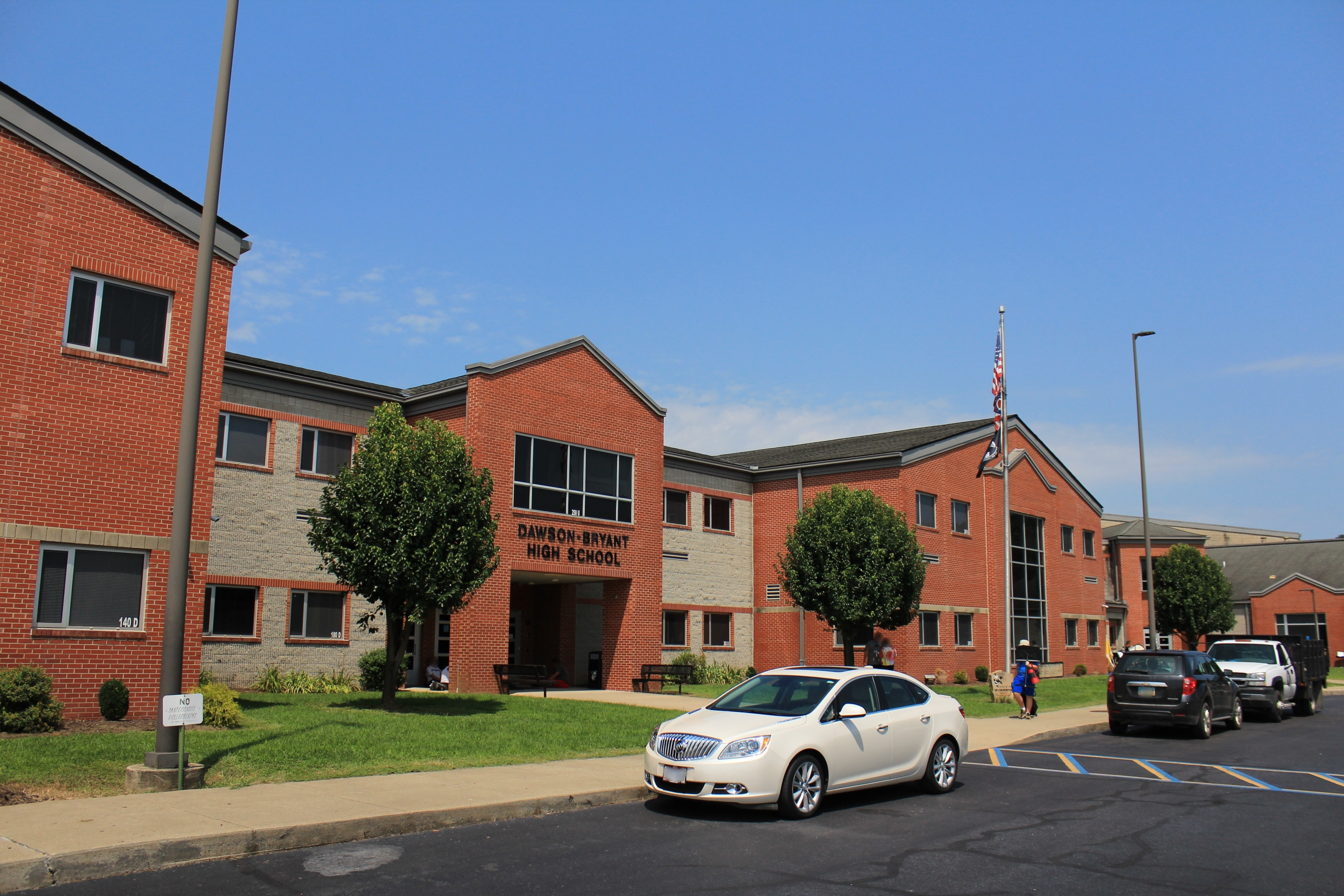

Location
- 1 Hornet Lane; Coal Grove, (Lawrence County), Ohio 45638; United States
- Coordinates: 38°30′11″N 82°38′45″W

Information
- Type: Public, Coeducational high school
- School district: Dawson-Bryant Local School District
- Superintendent: Ellen Adkins
- Principal: Chris Smith
- Teaching staff: 18.00 (FTE)
- Grades: 9-12
- Student to teacher ratio: 17.00
- Campus: Rural
- Colors: Red, Black and White
- Fight song: Coal Grove Victory March
- Athletics conference: Ohio Valley Conference
- Sports: Football, Basketball, Baseball, Softball, Marching Band, Volleyball, Track and Field, Cross Country, Golf, Bowling, Quizbowl, Indoor Percussion
- Mascot: Hornet
- Team name: Hornets
- Rival: Ironton Fighting Tigers Rock Hill Redmen Chesapeake Panthers
- Athletic Director: Shaun Smith
- Director of Federal Programs: Dean Mader
- Director of Special Education: Angela LaFon
- Website: www.db.k12.oh.us/dawson-bryanthighschool_home.aspx

Dawson-Bryant High School is a public high school in Coal Grove, Ohio. It is the only high school in the Dawson-Bryant Local School District.

== Athletics ==
Dawson-Bryant High School athletic teams are known as the Hornets. The school is a founding member of the Ohio Valley Conference. Currently, the other members of the conference include Chesapeake High School (Panthers), Rock Hill Senior High School (Redmen), Fairland High School (Dragons), South Point High School (Pointers), Ironton High School (Fighting Tigers), Portsmouth High School (Trojans), and Gallia Academy High School (Blue Devils)

=== Powerlifting ===
2006, 2007, 2009, and 2010 state champions

=== OMEA Superior Ratings ===
2015, 2016, 2019, and 2022

== Notable alumni ==
- Jerry Fields (1938–2019), football player
- Austen Pleasants (born 1997), NFL player
