= Reid Carrico =

American football player (born 2002)

Profile
- Position: Linebacker

Personal information
- Born: August 16, 2002 (age 24)
- Listed height: 6 ft 2 in (1.88 m)
- Listed weight: 226 lb (103 kg)

Career information
- High school: Ironton (Ironton, Ohio)
- College: Ohio State (2021–2023); West Virginia (2024–2025)
- NFL draft: 2026: undrafted

Career history
- Cleveland Browns (2026)*; Tennessee Titans (2026)*
- * Offseason or practice squad member only
- Stats at Pro Football Reference

Reid Carrico (born August 16, 2002) is an American football linebacker. He played college football for the Ohio State Buckeyes and West Virginia Mountaineers.

== Early life ==
Carrico attended Ironton High School in Ironton, Ohio. In his junior season, he totaled 168 tackles with 18 going for a loss, three sacks, four forced fumbles, and an interception. Coming out of high school, Carrico was rated as a four-star recruit and the 126th overall player in the class of 2021 by 247Sports, where he committed to play college football for the Ohio State Buckeyes over offers from other schools such as Alabama, Clemson, Florida, Florida State, LSU, Michigan, Penn State, and Texas.

== College career ==
=== Ohio State ===
During Carrico's first two seasons in 2021 and 2022, he played 20 defensive snaps, recording four tackles. In 2023, he made one tackle. After the conclusion of the season, Carrico entered the NCAA transfer portal.

=== West Virginia ===
Carrico transferred to play for the West Virginia Mountaineers. In his first season as a Mountaineer in 2024, he racked up 54 tackles. In the 2025 season finale, Carrico notched 11 tackles with one and a half being for a loss, and a sack versus Texas Tech. In 2025 he played in 12 games, with two starts, totaling 69 tackles with eight and a half going for a loss, four and a half sacks, a fumble recovery, and a pass deflection.

== Professional career ==
Pre-draft measurables
Height	Weight	Arm length	Hand span	Wingspan	40-yard dash	10-yard split	20-yard split	20-yard shuttle	Three-cone drill	Vertical jump	Broad jump	Bench press
6 ft 2 1/8 in (1.88 m)	226 lb (103 kg)	30 1/8 in (0.77 m)	9 1/4 in (0.23 m)	6 ft 4 1/4 in (1.94 m)	4.76 s	1.63 s	2.78 s	4.32 s	7.01 s	36.0 in (0.91 m)	9 ft 5 in (2.87 m)	23 reps
All values from Pro Day

=== Cleveland Browns ===
After not being selected in the 2026 NFL draft, Carrico signed with the Cleveland Browns as an undrafted free agent on May 19, 2026. He was waived by the Browns on August 7.

=== Tennessee Titans ===
On August 24, 2026, Carrico was signed by the Tennessee Titans. On August 30, Carrico was waived by the Titans as a part of final roster cuts before the start of the regular season.
