= Fairland High School (Proctorville, Ohio) =

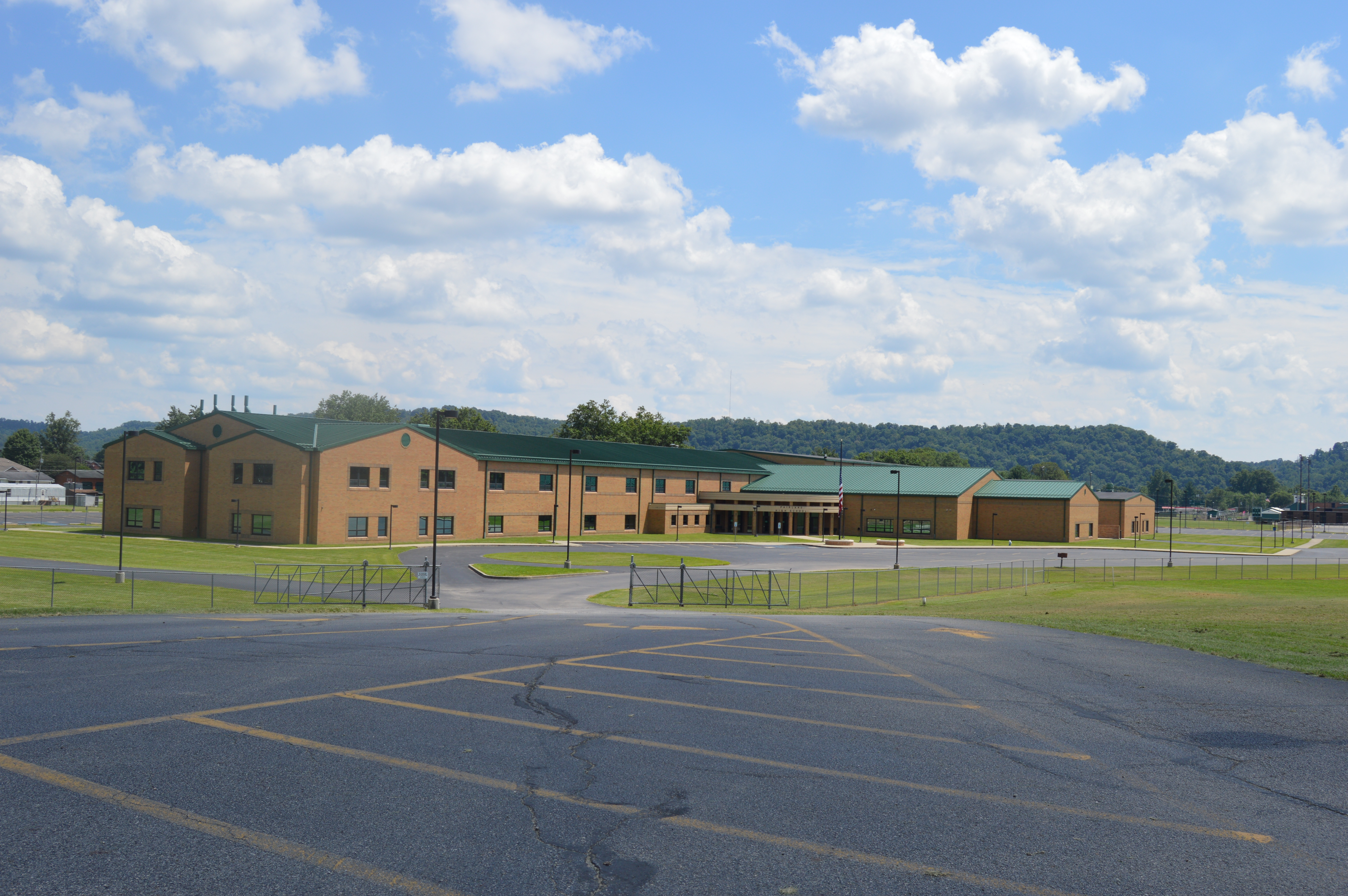
- Overview from the north

Location
- 812 County Road 411; Proctorville, (Lawrence County), Ohio 45669; United States
- 38°26′54″N 82°21′25″W

Information
- Type: Public, Coeducational high school
- Established: 1949
- School district: Fairland Local School District
- Authority: Fairland Local School District
- Superintendent: Roni Hayes
- Administrator: Renee Marshall
- Principal: Tessa Leep
- Teaching staff: 20.37 (FTE)
- Grades: 9-12
- Enrollment: 372 (2023–2024)
- Average class size: Total per class-time period is about 30 students. Total per grade is about 180 students.
- Student to teacher ratio: 18.26
- Campus type: High School
- Colors: Kelly Green, White, and Gold
- Slogan: "Everyday, in every way, excellence is a way of life."
- Fight song: Washington and Lee Swing
- Athletics: Fairland Athletics
- Athletics conference: Ohio Valley Conference
- Sports: Football, Basketball, Baseball, Wrestling, Softball, Volleyball, (Indoor) Track and Field, Cross Country, Golf, Soccer
- Mascot: Dragon
- Rivals: Chesapeake Panthers
- Newspaper: The Dragon's Breath
- Yearbook: The Fairlander
- Communities served: Proctorville, Crown City.
- Affiliation: Fairland Local School District
- Athletic Director: Jeff Gorby
- Band Director: Chris Shew
- Website: https://www.fairland.k12.oh.us/fairlandhighschool_home.aspx

Fairland High School (FHS) is a public high school in Proctorville, Ohio, United States. It is the only high school in the Fairland Local School District.

== History ==
Fairland High School was formed in 1949 as a consolidation of Proctorville High School and Rome Rural High School. From 1949-1956, students attended school at the former Rome Rural HS. In 1956, a new building was opened adjacent to the Lawrence County Fairgrounds, hence the name "Fairland", and would remain the district's high school until 2002. In 2003, the current building opened and the 1956 building was renovated and transformed into Fairland Middle School.

== Athletics ==
Fairland High School is a member of the Ohio Valley Conference (OVC) along with Chesapeake, Coal Grove (Dawson-Bryant), Ironton, Portsmouth, Rock Hill, South Point, Gallia Academy.

The Dragons and Lady Dragons compete in Baseball, Basketball (Boys and Girls), Cross Country (Boys and Girls), Football, Soccer (Boys and Girls), Softball, Indoor and Outdoor Track & Field (Boys and Girls), Tennis (Boys), Swimming (Girls) Volleyball, and Wrestling.

The Dragons Football Team has won the OVC Championship 12 times (1967, 1972, 1973, 1974, 1975, 1984, 1985, 1993, 1997, 2008, 2013, and 2024) and have advanced to the OHSAA playoffs 9 times (1993, 2003, 2013, 2018, 2020, 2021, 2022, 2023, 2024.) Melvin Cunningham guided the Dragons to their first 2 playoff wins in school history during the 2020 season and an appearance in the division 5 region 19 championship game, finishing the season with a record of 8-2 (the season was shortened due to the COVID-19 pandemic). Cunningham in 2021, and current head coach Michael Jackson in 2024 coached Fairland to their best records in school history of 10-2.

The boys and girls basketball teams have enjoyed a long history of success including multiple conference, district, and regional titles. The 1961 Dragons Basketball team is known locally as "The Untouchables". The team finished the regular season with a perfect record going on to win the sectional, district, and regional titles before falling in the state semi-final round.

The 2014, 2015, 2023, 2024, 2025, and 2026 Lady Dragons Basketball teams, all of which were coached by Proctorville village councilman Jon Buchanan, captured district and regional titles before falling in the OHSAA State semifinals.

James Carter, who wore no. 60, sustained a brain injury during a game in 1952, while playing Portsmouth East High School. The injury affected his respiratory system and he died. The Fairland Dragons football team retired no. 60 in 2010.
