= South Point High School (Ohio) =

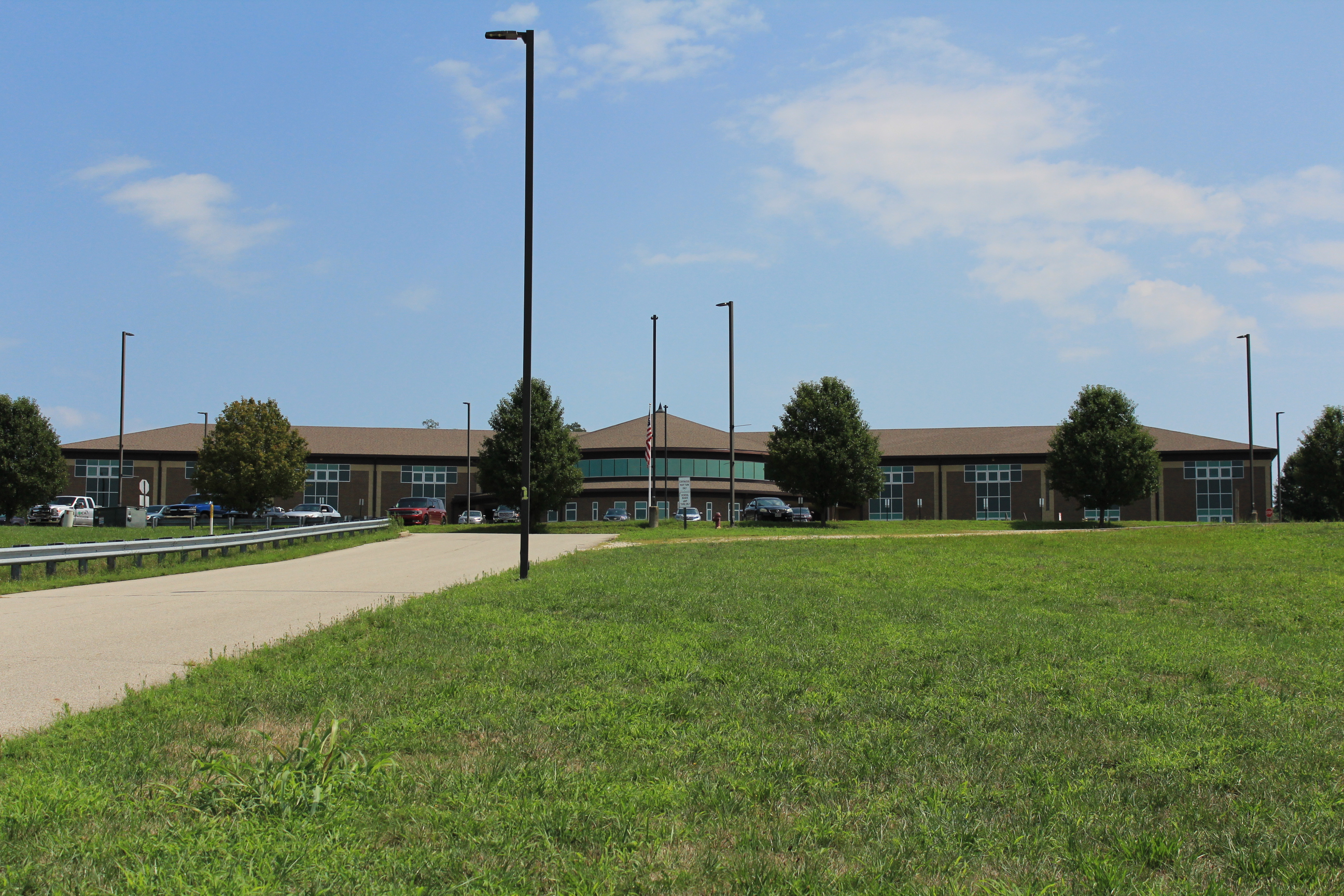

Location
- 983 County Road 60; South Point, (Lawrence County), Ohio 45680; United States
- Coordinates: 38°26′21″N 82°34′43″W

Information
- Type: Public, Coeducational, High School
- School district: South Point Local School District
- Superintendent: Chris Mathes
- Principal: Doug Graham
- Teaching staff: 24.00 (FTE)
- Grades: 9-12
- Student to teacher ratio: 14.29
- Color
- Fight song: Hail to The Pointers
- Athletics conference: Ohio Valley Conference
- Sports: Football, Basketball, Baseball, Volleyball, Softball, Track and Field, Cross County, Soccer, Golf, and Bowling
- Mascot: Pointer Dog (Hunting Dog)
- Nickname: Pointers
- Team name: South Point
- Rival: Chesapeake Panthers, Coal Grove Hornets
- Communities served: South Point, Ohio
- Assistant Superintendent: Brian Kidd
- Website: www.southpoint.k12.oh.us

South Point High School is a public high school in South Point, Ohio. It is the only high school in the South Point Local School District. The school is operated by principal Doug Graham and assistant principal Jeff Sanders. The district's mascot nickname is The Pointers. The Pointer dog is named Ol' Blue and is considered a Kentucky Blue Tick hound dog.

The current school building was completed in 2012 and includes new football, track & field, baseball, and softball athletic facilities.

== Marching Band ==
Dubbed locally as the "Band of Gold", currently under the direction of David Edwards, the South Point High School Marching Band has received a superior rating at the Ohio Music Education Association state marching band finals for the past 11 years. The band performs at local O.M.E.A competitions and recently attended the Bands of America Grand National Championship in Indianapolis, Indiana for the first time in 2012 with their show "Beautifully Broken". The band performed in the BOA Grand National Championship again in the fall of 2014, coming as close as 9/10 of a point to making semifinals. Additionally, the band performs for football games, home basketball games, and a variety of parades as well.

== Athletics ==
South Point High School is a founding member of the Ohio Valley Conference. Currently, the other members of the conference include Chesapeake High School (Panthers), Coal Grove Dawson-Bryant High School (Hornets), Proctorville Fairland High School (Dragons), Rock Hill High School (Redmen), Ironton High School (Fighting Tigers) Portsmouth High School (Trojans) and Gallia Academy High School (Blue Devils).

From 1948 to 1951, the Pointers were members of the Southern Ohio Conference.
