= Austen Pleasants =

American football player (born 1997)

No. 62 – San Francisco 49ers
- Position: Offensive tackle
- Roster status: Injured reserve

Personal information
- Born: August 22, 1997 (age 29); Ironton, Ohio, U.S.
- Listed height: 6 ft 7 in (2.01 m)
- Listed weight: 330 lb (150 kg)

Career information
- High school: Dawson-Bryant (Coal Grove, Ohio)
- College: Ohio (2015–2019)
- NFL draft: 2020: undrafted

Career history
- Jacksonville Jaguars (2020–2021)*; Carolina Panthers (2021–2022); Los Angeles Chargers (2022–2023)*; Chicago Bears (2023)*; Arizona Cardinals (2023)*; Los Angeles Chargers (2023); Arizona Cardinals (2024)*; Chicago Bears (2024)*; San Francisco 49ers (2024–present)
- * Offseason or practice squad member only

Awards and highlights
- Second-team All-MAC (2019)

Career NFL statistics as of 2025
- Games played: 20
- Games started: 1
- Stats at Pro Football Reference

Austen Pleasants (born August 22, 1997) is an American professional football offensive tackle for the San Francisco 49ers of the National Football League (NFL). He played college football for the Ohio Bobcats.

== Early life ==
Pleasants was born on August 22, 1997, in Ironton, Ohio, son of Michael Wilburn and Jennifer Vanderhoof-Pleasants. Has one younger brother, Arik. He attended Dawson-Bryant High School in Coal Grove, Ohio, and was a four year letterman in football, basketball, and Track and Field. He earned multiple honors while playing as an offensive lineman and defensive tackle and was a 2-star recruit as a lineman. He accepted a football scholarship offer from Ohio University over University of Akron and University of Toledo.

== College career ==
Pleasants redshirted his first college year for Ohio but finished his career with 28 games and 20 starts. He earned Second-team All-Mid-American Conference honors in 2019.

== Professional career ==
Pre-draft measurables
Height	Weight	Arm length	Hand span	Wingspan
6 ft 6 1/8 in (1.98 m)	310 lb (141 kg)	33 3/8 in (0.85 m)	10 1/8 in (0.26 m)	6 ft 10 in (2.08 m)
All values from Pro Day

=== Jacksonville Jaguars ===
On April 25, 2020, Pleasants was signed by the Jacksonville Jaguars after going undrafted in the 2020 NFL draft. On September 7, he was re-signed to Jacksonville's practice squad after being waived the day before. On October 18, Pleasants was placed on the practice squad/COVID-19 list. He was activated off the list on October 22. After being waived in September 2021, Pleasants was signed to Jaguars practice squad on October 9, 2021. On October 12, he was released from the practice squad.

=== Carolina Panthers ===
Pleasants was signed to the Carolina Panthers' practice squad on October 12, 2021, the same day he was released from the Jaguars. He was elevated to the active roster on November 27, and played his first career game in the Week 12 10–33 loss against the Miami Dolphins. On January 11, 2022, Pleasants signed a reserve/future contract with the team. On August 22, Pleasants was waived by the Panthers.

=== Los Angeles Chargers ===
On November 9, 2022, Pleasants was signed to the Los Angeles Chargers' practice squad. He signed a reserve/future contract with Los Angeles on January 17, 2023. On August 29, Pleasants was waived by the Chargers and re-signed to the practice squad. He was released on September 12.

=== Chicago Bears ===
On September 20, 2023, Pleasants was signed to the Chicago Bears' practice squad. He was released on October 21.

=== Arizona Cardinals ===
On November 8, 2023, Pleasants was signed to the Arizona Cardinals' practice squad. He was released on November 28.

=== Los Angeles Chargers (second stint) ===
On December 1, 2023, Pleasants was signed to the Los Angeles Chargers' practice squad.

=== Arizona Cardinals (second stint) ===
On January 9, 2024, Pleasants signed a reserve/future contract with the Arizona Cardinals. He was waived on August 26, and later re-signed to the practice squad. He was released on October 15.

=== Chicago Bears (second stint) ===
On October 29, 2024, Pleasants was signed to the Chicago Bears' practice squad. He was released by the Bears on December 3.

=== San Francisco 49ers ===
On December 17, 2024, Pleasants was signed to the San Francisco 49ers' practice squad. On December 21, Pleasants was promoted to the active roster.

On April 17, 2025, Pleasants re-signed with the 49ers.
