= Coal Grove, Ohio =

- Village
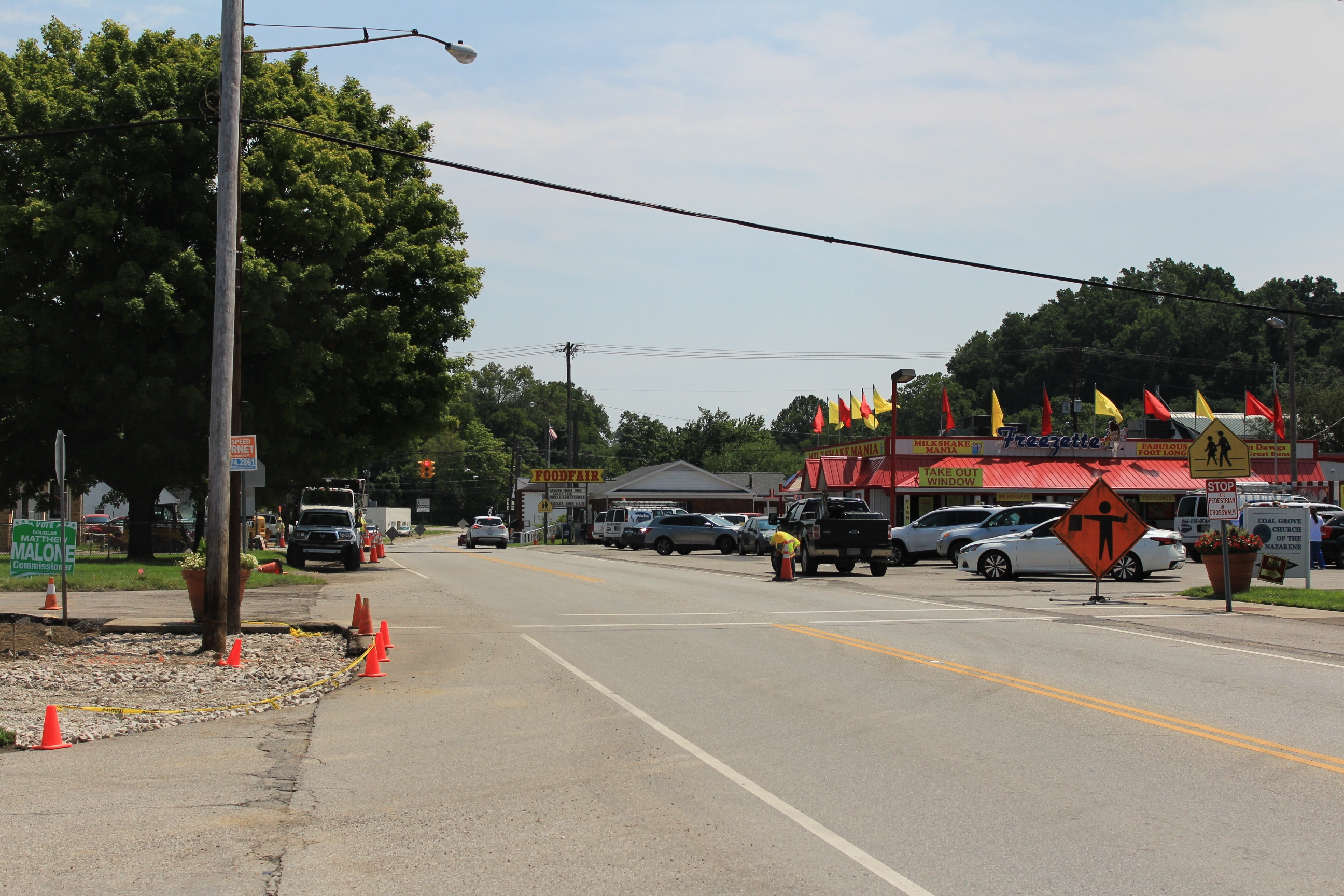
- Marion Pike (SR 243) running through the village

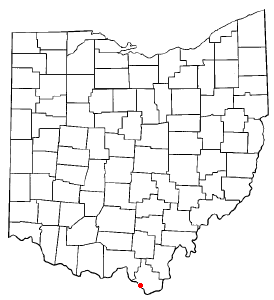
- Location of Coal Grove, Ohio

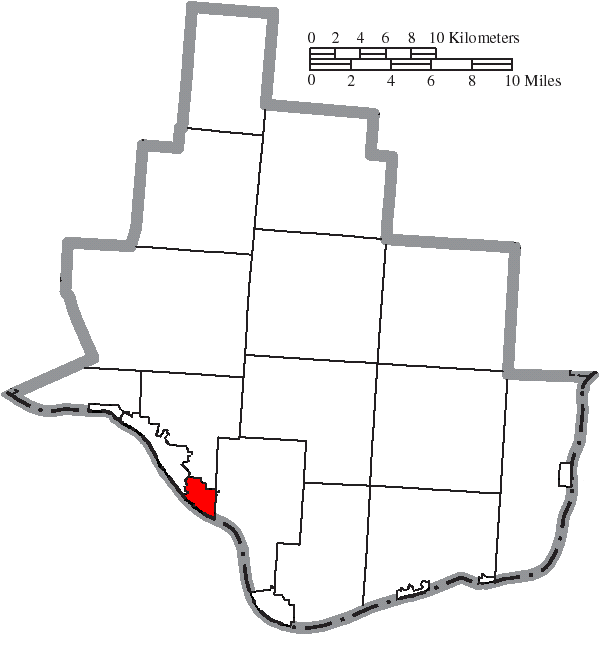
- Location of Coal Grove in Lawrence County
- Coordinates: 38°30′10″N 82°38′38″W
- Country: United States
- State: Ohio
- County: Lawrence
- Townships: Upper, Perry

Area
  - Total: 2.04 sq mi (5.28 km^{2})
  - Land: 1.91 sq mi (4.94 km^{2})
  - Water: 0.14 sq mi (0.35 km^{2})
- Elevation: 600 ft (180 m)

Population (2020)
  - Total: 1,889
  - Estimate (2024): 1,804
  - Density: 990.9/sq mi (382.59/km^{2})
- Time zone: UTC-5 (Eastern (EST))
  - Summer (DST): UTC-4 (EDT)
- ZIP code: 45638
- Area code: 740
- FIPS code: 39-16378
- GNIS feature ID: 2398587

Coal Grove is a village in Lawrence County, Ohio, United States, along the Ohio River. The population was 1,889 at the 2020 census. It borders the city of Ironton and lies across the Ohio River from Ashland, Kentucky. It is linked to Ashland by the Ben Williamson Memorial Bridge and Simeon Willis Memorial Bridge.

Coal Grove is a part of the Huntington-Ashland, WV-KY-OH, Metropolitan Statistical Area (MSA).

== History ==
Coal Grove was once known as "Petersburg" or "Petersburgh." Its name has also been spelled "Coalgrove."

In June 2019 a large amount of sodium permanganate was dumped into a malfunctioned water pipe, turning the water light pink. According to officials, the water was safe to drink, but it was recommended not to wash clothes with it.

== Geography ==
According to the United States Census Bureau, the village has a total area of 2.04 square miles (5.28 km^{2}), of which 1.90 square miles (4.92 km^{2}) is land and 0.14 square miles (0.36 km^{2}) is water.

== Demographics ==
Historical population
Census	Pop.	Note	%±
1890	506		—
1900	1,191		135.4%
1910	1,759		47.7%
1920	1,851		5.2%
1930	2,181		17.8%
1940	2,351		7.8%
1950	2,492		6.0%
1960	2,961		18.8%
1970	2,759		−6.8%
1980	2,602		−5.7%
1990	2,251		−13.5%
2000	2,027		−10.0%
2010	2,069		2.1%
2020	1,889		−8.7%
2024 (est.)	1,804		−4.5%
U.S. Decennial Census

=== 2010 census ===
As of the census of 2010, there were 2,165 people, 833 households, and 593 families living in the village. The population density was 1,139.5 inhabitants per square mile (440.0/km^{2}). There were 891 housing units at an average density of 468.9 per square mile (181.0/km^{2}). The racial makeup of the village was 97.7% White, 0.6% African American, 0.4% Native American, 0.1% from other races, and 1.1% from two or more races. Hispanic or Latino of any race were 0.3% of the population.

There were 833 households, of which 36.6% had children under the age of 18 living with them, 44.8% were married couples living together, 20.3% had a female householder with no husband present, 6.1% had a male householder with no wife present, and 28.8% were non-families. 24.1% of all households were made up of individuals, and 11.3% had someone living alone who was 65 years of age or older. The average household size was 2.55 and the average family size was 2.96.

The median age in the village was 38.5 years. 24.4% of residents were under the age of 18; 10.4% were between the ages of 18 and 24; 25.1% were from 25 to 44; 23.7% were from 45 to 64; and 16.3% were 65 years of age or older. The gender makeup of the village was 47.1% male and 52.9% female.

=== 2000 census ===
As of the census of 2000, there were 2,027 people, 810 households, and 562 families living in the village. The population density was 1,028.1 inhabitants per square mile (397.0/km^{2}). There were 877 housing units at an average density of 444.8 per square mile (171.7/km^{2}). The racial makeup of the village was 98.77% White, 0.10% African American, 0.35% Native American, 0.05% from other races, and 0.74% from two or more races. Hispanic or Latino of any race were 0.69% of the population.

There were 810 households, out of which 30.2% had children under the age of 18 living with them, 51.5% were married couples living together, 13.7% had a female householder with no husband present, and 30.6% were non-families. 27.9% of all households were made up of individuals, and 14.6% had someone living alone who was 65 years of age or older. The average household size was 2.43 and the average family size was 2.90.

In the village, the population was spread out, with 23.6% under the age of 18, 9.4% from 18 to 24, 25.1% from 25 to 44, 24.3% from 45 to 64, and 17.6% who were 65 years of age or older. The median age was 39 years. For every 100 females, there were 89.6 males. For every 100 females age 18 and over, there were 82.1 males.

The median income for a household in the village was $26,101, and the median income for a family was $33,000. Males had a median income of $29,886 versus $21,563 for females. The per capita income for the village was $14,332. About 15.0% of families and 18.6% of the population were below the poverty line, including 29.3% of those under age 18 and 9.2% of those age 65 or over.

== Government ==
The village is managed by a mayor and a village council. As of the 2023 election, the Mayor of Coal Grove is J. Andrew Holmes and the six council members are Mike McKenzie, Diane Wise, Greg Massie, Denise Paulus, Robin Heaberlin, and Nick McKnight. As of 2022, the current Fiscal Officer is Candase Rowe.

The current Chief of Police is Bill Murphy and the Fire Chief is Chad Kelly.

== Education ==
Coal Grove is the home to the Dawson-Bryant Local School District. The district maintains one high school and middle school in the village itself and one elementary school in Deering. The schools are named after two local men, Homer Dawson and Curtis Bryant, who fought in the First World War. Located near Deering is a one-room schoolhouse that used to serve all grades. This building has the distinction of being one of the oldest structures in the county.

== Notable people ==
- Austen Pleasants, NFL player
- Joe Willis, Major League Baseball player

== See also ==
- List of cities and towns along the Ohio River
