= Fairland Local School District =

School district in Ohio

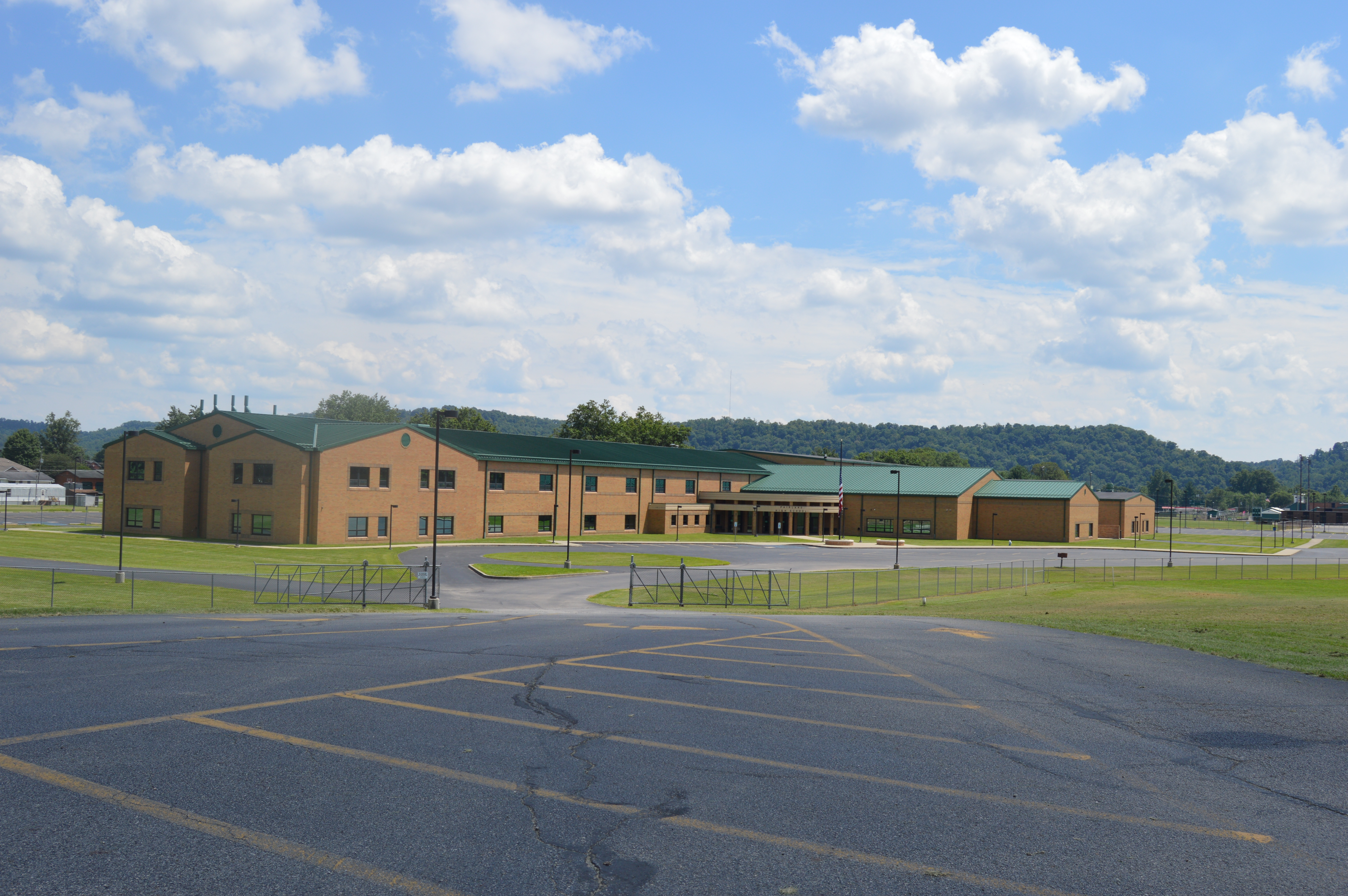
Fairland High School

The Fairland Local School District was formed in 1949 as a consolidation of Proctorville and Rome Rural schools. It serves the village of Proctorville, Rome Township, parts of Union and Windsor Township in Lawrence County, as well as parts of Crown City and Guyan Township in Gallia County, all in Ohio. It consists of four schools; Fairland East Elementary (PreK-2), Fairland West Elementary (3-5), Fairland Middle (6-8), and Fairland High School (9-12). The Fairland Dragon is its mascot.

== School Board ==
The Fairland Local School District elects a 5-member board, with 3 members being up the year after each presidential election, and two being up the year after each midterm election.

Member	Term expires
Mark Hall	2027
Robyn Chapman	2027
Jeff Bennett	2029
Eric Salyers	2029
Martin Appleton	2029

For 2026, the Fairland Local Board of Education officers are: Mark Hall, President; Robyn Chapman, Vice President.

The board meets the second Monday of the month, unless otherwise announced.
