= Bob Lutz (American football) =

American football coach

Robert Lutz is the former head football coach of Ironton High School and Saint Joseph Central High School, both in Ironton, Ohio. In 2009, Lutz passed former Hamilton Catholic High School and Father Stephen T. Badin High School head coach Terry Malone for the record of most wins in Ohio high school football history with his 361st career victory. The win also moved Lutz into a tie with three others for the 17th-highest win total in national history.

Lutz began his head coaching career in 1969 at Saint Joseph Central High School. In three seasons at the school, he led the Flyers to a 20–8–1 record. During his tenure, he led Ironton to the third-most playoff appearances in state history at 28, winning state titles in 1979 and 1989, leading six teams to become state runners-up in 1973, 1982, 1988, 1992, 1993, and 1999, and leading ten teams to become state semifinalists.

Lutz was inducted into the National High School Federation Hall of Fame. In 2003, he was inducted into the Ohio High School Football Coaches Association Hall of Fame.

On January 17, 2012, Lutz announced his retirement following 39 years as head football coach of Ironton and 42 years of coaching overall. Lutz ended his career with an overall record of 381–91–5.

In August, 2025, Lutz was inducted into the Ohio Sports Hall of Fame.
