= Chesapeake High School (Ohio) =

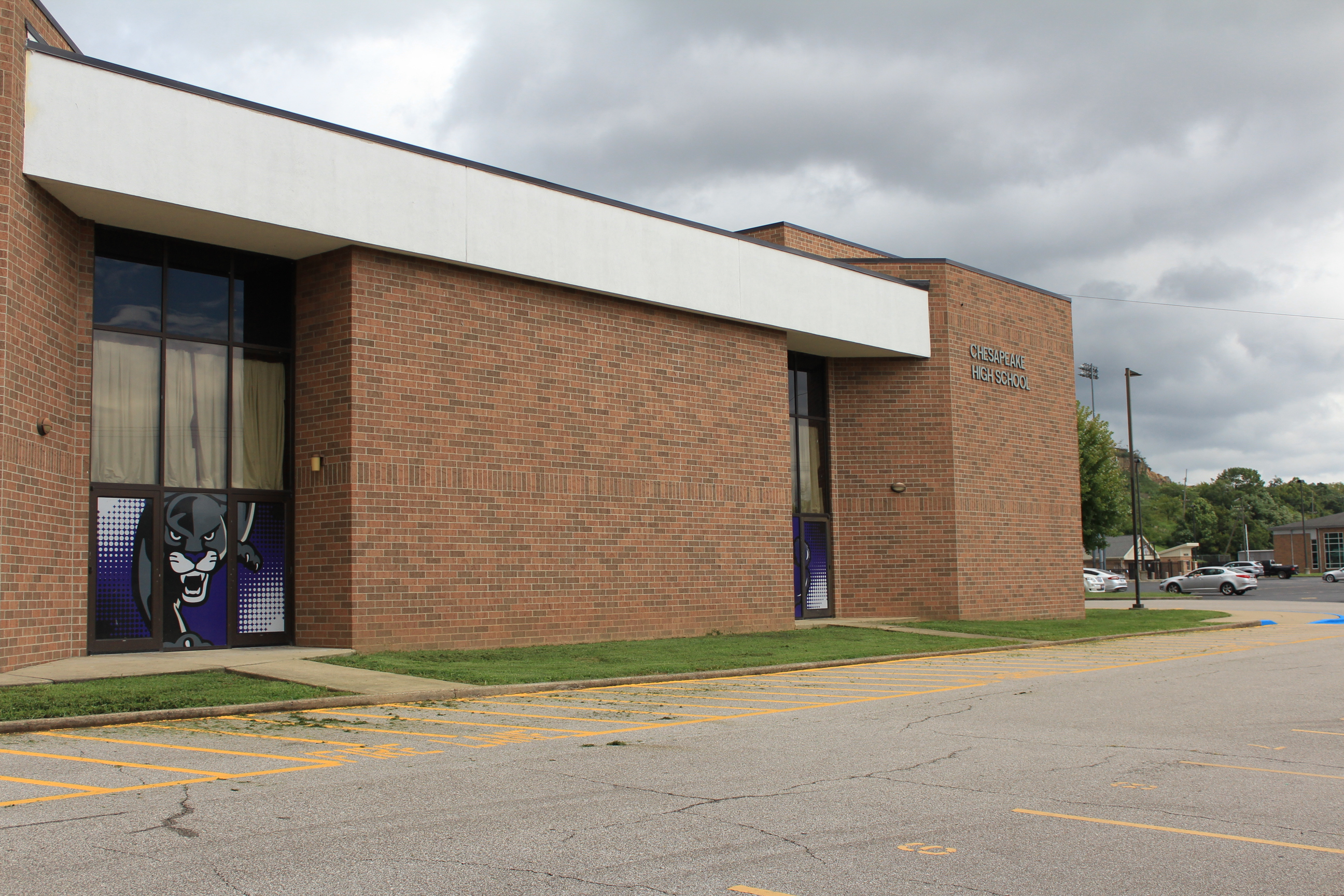

Location
- 10181 County Road 1 Chesapeake, Ohio 45619; United States
- Coordinates: 38°25′22″N 82°29′10″W

Information
- Type: Public high school
- Established: 1924
- School district: Chesapeake Union Exempted Village Schools
- NCES School ID: 390452902163
- Principal: Greg Sullivan
- Teaching staff: 21.33 (on an FTE basis)
- Grades: 9-12
- Enrollment: 348 (2023-2024)
- Colors: Purple and white
- Fight song: CHS Fight Song
- Athletics conference: Ohio Valley Conference
- Mascot: Panther
- Nickname: The Peake
- Team name: Chesapeake Panthers
- Rival: Fairland Dragons
- Website: www.peake.k12.oh.us

Chesapeake High School (CHS), commonly referred to by locals as The Peake, is a public high school in Chesapeake, Ohio, United States.
