= Eastern Local School District =

Public school district based in Reedsville, Ohio

The Eastern Local School District is a public school district based in the community of Reedsville, Ohio, United States.

The school district includes all of Orange and Olive townships as well as most of Chester Township, the northern portion of Lebanon Township, and a very small portion of far eastern Bedford Township.

Eastern Local Schools serve several unincorporated communities in northeastern Meigs County, including Reedsville, Chester, Long Bottom, and Tuppers Plains.

== Schools ==
- Eastern High School (Grades 9-12)
- Eastern Elementary School (Grades K-8)

== See also ==
- List of school districts in Ohio
