= Minersville, Ohio =

- Unincorporated community
- Location within Ohio Location within the United States
- Coordinates: 39°1′21″N 81°59′37″W
- Country: United States
- State: Ohio
- County: Meigs
- Township: Sutton
- Elevation: 574 ft (175 m)
- Time zone: UTC-5 (Eastern (EST))
  - Summer (DST): UTC-4 (EDT)
- ZIP Code: 45771 (Racine)
- GNIS feature ID: 1048980

Minersville is an unincorporated community in Sutton Township, Meigs County, in the U.S. state of Ohio.
