= Nelson Story =

American cattleman (1838–1926)

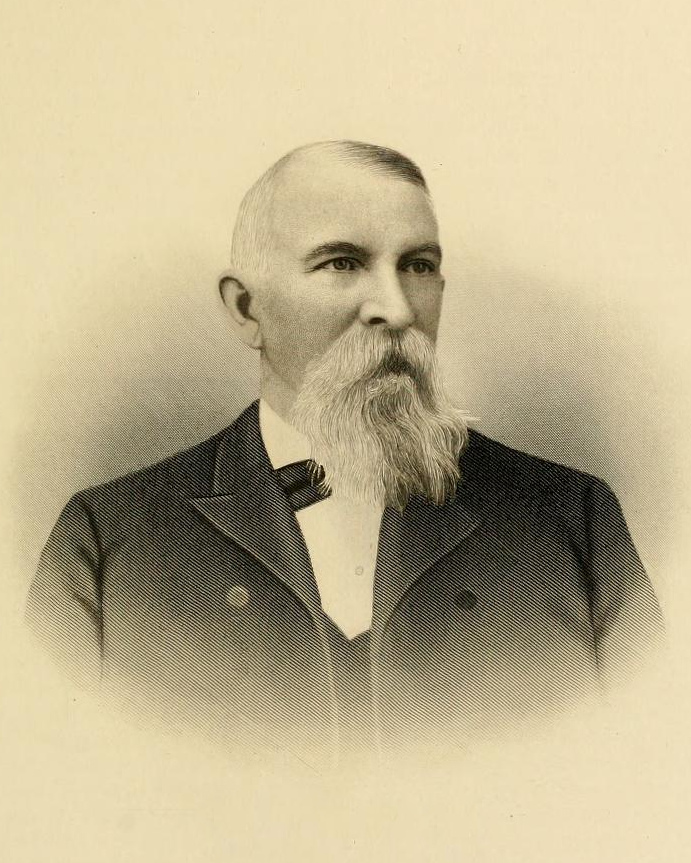
- Born: April 4, 1838; Burlingham, Ohio, US
- Died: March 10, 1926 (aged 87); Los Angeles, California, US
- Resting place: Sunset Hills Cemetery, Bozeman, Montana; 45°40′31.93″N 111°01′35.38″W
- Occupations: Cattleman, rancher, businessman, banker, real estate developer
- Spouse: Ellen Trent Story
- Children: Nelson Jr., T. Byron, Walter P.

Nelson Story Sr. (April 4, 1838 – March 10, 1926) was a pioneer Montana entrepreneur, cattle rancher, miner and vigilante, who was a notable resident of Bozeman, Montana. He participated in the 1866 cattle drive from Texas with approximately 1000 head of Texas Longhorns to Montana along the Bozeman Trail—the first major cattle drive from Texas into Montana. His business ventures in Bozeman were so successful that he became the town's first millionaire. In 1893, he played a prominent role in the establishment of the Agricultural College of the State of Montana by donating land and facilities. He built the first Story Mansion on Main Street in Bozeman in 1880 and later built today's Story Mansion at the corner of Willson and College for his son, T. Byron Story in 1910. In his later years, he became a prominent real estate developer in Los Angeles, California.

== Early life ==
Nelson Story Sr. was born in Burlingham, Meigs County, Ohio in 1838. Nelson was the youngest son of Ira and Hannah Story previously from New Hampshire.

By the age of 18, Story was an orphan, taught school, and had been a student at Ohio University for two years. He made his way west to Fort Leavenworth, Kansas Territory to hire on as a bullwhacker with a freighting outfit. By 1862 he was a successful freight driver operating out of Denver, Colorado. During a trip to Missouri, he met Ellen Trent and married her in Kansas 1862. In 1863, Story left Colorado with pack mules and ox teams and headed for Montana territory. Nelson and Ellen arrived in Virginia City, Montana in June 1863 shortly after the major gold strike at Alder Gulch, Montana.

== Montana gold fields ==
Story learned of a gold field that he felt had not been fully worked near Alder Gulch and began working it. Within a few months Story made $30,000 in gold; he exchanged it for $20,000 in cash and traveled to Fort Worth, Texas. He used this stake to finance the first cattle drive from Texas to Montana. Later, as a merchant operating in the Bannack and Virginia City, Montana, Story participated in the vigilante committees that ultimately hanged 21 criminals, including Henry Plummer.

== 1866 Cattle Drive ==
In 1866, Nelson Story traveled to Texas and spent $10,000 for 1000 (some accounts indicate possibly as many as 3000) head of Longhorn cattle. 1866 was the first year after the end of the American Civil War, and the economy of Texas, as in the rest of the former Confederacy, was devastated. However, there were significant numbers of cattle roaming Texas that could be had for very little money. Also, there was great demand for beef in the northern states along with money to pay for it. So, many returning Confederate soldiers begged or borrowed a stake to get a herd together. Many others signed on as trail drive cowboys. Give or take, about 260,000 cattle were driven north from Texas that summer toward the nearest rail shipping point at Sedalia, Missouri, in hopes of selling them there for a quick profit. To reach Sedalia, the cattle first had to be driven through the territory which was to become Oklahoma, but which at the time was the Indian Territory. This was the domain of the remnants of the Five Civilized Nations who had survived the Trail of Tears. While the tribes previously had tolerated the passage of a few herds, an exodus of this magnitude threatened their ability to support their own grazing cattle. Rather than blocking the herds entirely, they decided to charge 10 cents a head for passage. Story paid the fee.

During the Civil War, bands of Union Kansans known as Jayhawkers had raided east into Confederate Missouri. At the war's close, they remained as a force in Kansas. The crossing point for the Texas herds into Kansas/Missouri was at the town of Baxter Springs in the southeast corner of Kansas. Here the Jayhawkers stopped cattle drives cold, stealing some herds and generally forcing the rest to stay in the Indian Territory. This was the situation that Story found when he arrived at Baxter Springs. As he approached the town, armed men demanded two dollars per head for the longhorns to continue. Story refused to pay, and instead routed his cattle through Indian Territory on a circuitous route toward Fort Leavenworth.

Nelson Story decided to try for Montana and its lucrative market of gold miners in Virginia City, Montana, and became part of the first ever cattle drive on the Bozeman Trail. He pointed his herd north for the long drive. With a large measure of courage and a large measure of luck he brought his cattle over the Bozeman Trail into Montana. At Fort Phil Kearny, between present day Buffalo and Sheridan, Wyoming, the U.S. Army ordered Story and his drovers to stop because of aggression by Sioux warriors led by Red Cloud. Story ignored the order, evaded the Army, and continued the drive into Montana, encountering and fighting Sioux warriors along the way. Only one drover was killed by Indians. The feat would not be duplicated for another 4 years. Story and the herd arrived in what is now Livingston, Montana, in December 1866 and established winter quarters for his men and cattle. Story established a thriving cattle herd, and for at least two years he shrewdly bought and sold cattle to hungry miners for up to ten times the Texas price. In 1870, when placer mining in Montana was starting to decline, Story and his ranch in the Paradise Valley had become the leading cattleman in the northern plains. Some credit Story with naming the now famous Paradise Valley for its grand scenery and abundant wildlife. This 1866 cattle drive inspired Larry McMurtry's Pulitzer Prize-winning novel Lonesome Dove.

== Bozeman, Montana ==
Story settled his family in Bozeman where he used his business sense and cattle fortune to engage in banking, mercantile, and grain businesses. In 1882, along with Lester S. Willson, J.E. Martin, Broox Martin, and Edwin Lewis, Story helped capitalize one of the first banks in the county, the Gallatin Valley National Bank. The bank failed during the Panic of 1893 and never reopened. In 1882, Story opened the Story Flour Mill at the mouth of Bridger Creek. This mill produced up to 100 bushels a day and was a major source of flour for the U.S. Army at Fort Ellis and for the Crow Indian Reservation in southeastern Montana. His business activities made him Bozeman's first millionaire. Nelson Story was a charter member of the Society of Montana Pioneers and society Vice President for Gallatin County in 1886.

The reader is also referred to https://www.historynet.com/bozeman-agency-crow-indians/?r regarding Story's business practices in Bozeman with the Crow Indians.

== Los Angeles, California ==
Story and his wife Ellen had a son, Walter Perry Story, who was born in Bozeman, Montana, on December 18, 1882. He was the last born of their children. Walter began his education but later attended Shattuck Military Academy at Faribault, Minnesota. He left there in 1902 and graduated from Eastman Business College at Poughkeepsie, New York in 1903. He returned to Bozeman to work with his father until 1905, when he went back to Los Angeles. There he worked in real estate and founded the first motor transit line in the western United States. He then helped his father develop more business in Los Angeles, including building the Walter P. Story Building, which had twelve stories and was completed on April 1, 1910. The elder Story then retired and move back to Bozeman but died in Los Angeles on March 10, 1926. Walter began his military service by enlisting as a private, later serving in World War I. He was out of the military until 1920 when he was commissioned as a captain of infantry in the California National Guard. He became a brigadier general in July 1926. He wasn't promoted to major general for another 11 years. In 1928 he founded Camp Merriam, which is now known as Camp San Luis Obispo. He entered federal military service in March 1941 and took command of the 40th Infantry Division. He was relieved of command in September 1941, and retired from active list in July 1942.

== Legacy ==
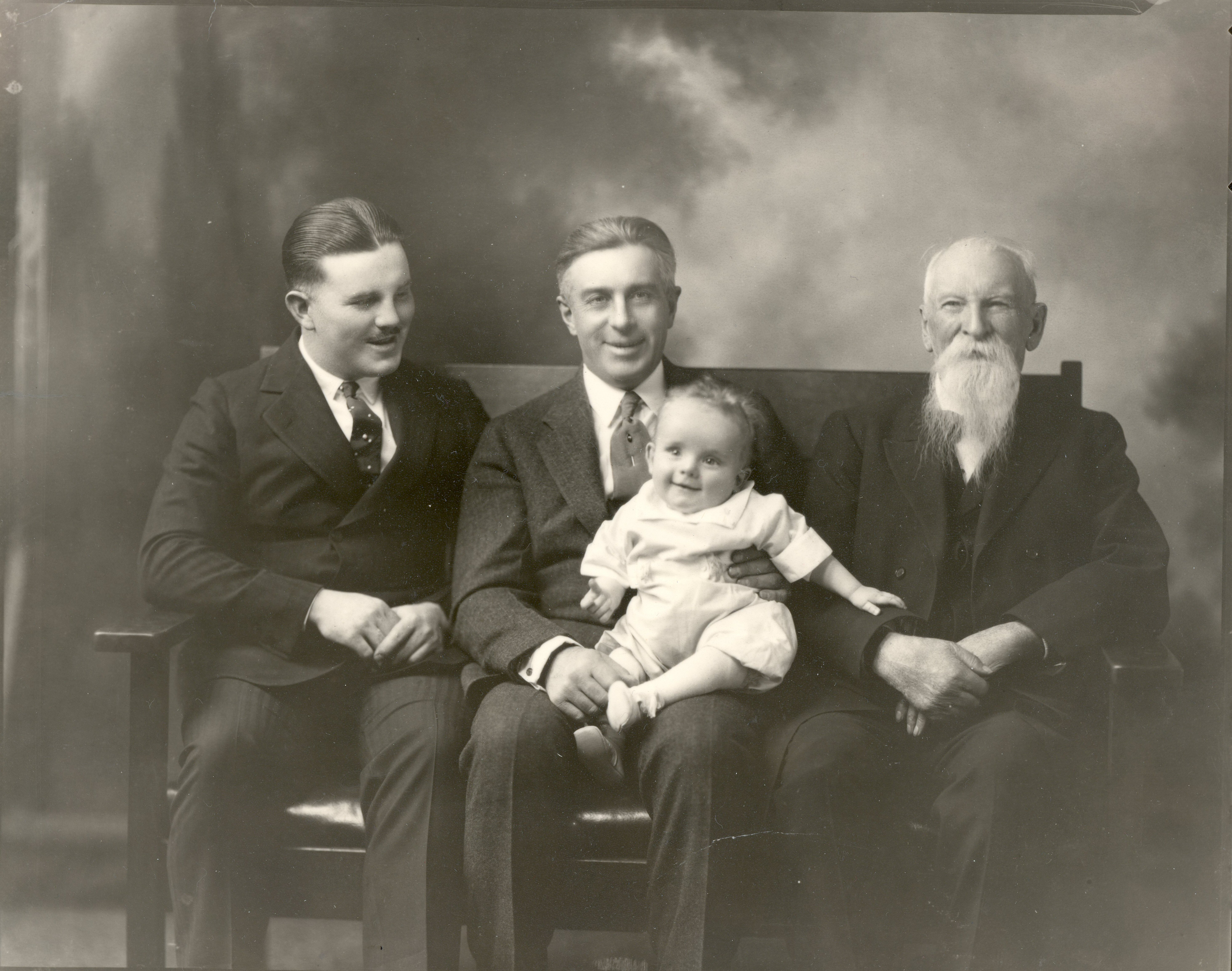
Three generations of Storys—Nelson Sr., Walter and T. Byron, and Malcolm Story

Nelson and Ellen Story had seven children, four of whom survived to adulthood. Nelson Jr. (1874–1932) became an alternate delegate to Republican National Convention from Montana in 1904, the mayor of Bozeman (1905–07), and the Lieutenant Governor of Montana (1921–25). Thomas Byron Story (1876–1954) became a prominent Bozeman merchant and lived in the new Story Mansion on College St. and Willson Ave. Walter P. Story (1882–1957) became a prominent Los Angeles businessman and decorated major general in the California National Guard. The Walter P. Story Building (1909) at 6th and Broadway in Los Angeles, California, was built by Nelson Story as a gift to Walter. It was one of the first skyscrapers in Los Angeles and still stands today as The New Story Building. Nelson Story's great-great grandson, Nelson Story, still operates the Story Ranch and Cattle Company in Paradise Valley, Montana. Story donated 160 acres (65 ha) of land in 1893 for an agricultural college that became Montana State University. In 1876 he was accused, but not indicted, of defrauding the Crow Indians—and later claimed he had bribed the jury. He was called a "cattle king", "captain of industry", and a "robber baron".

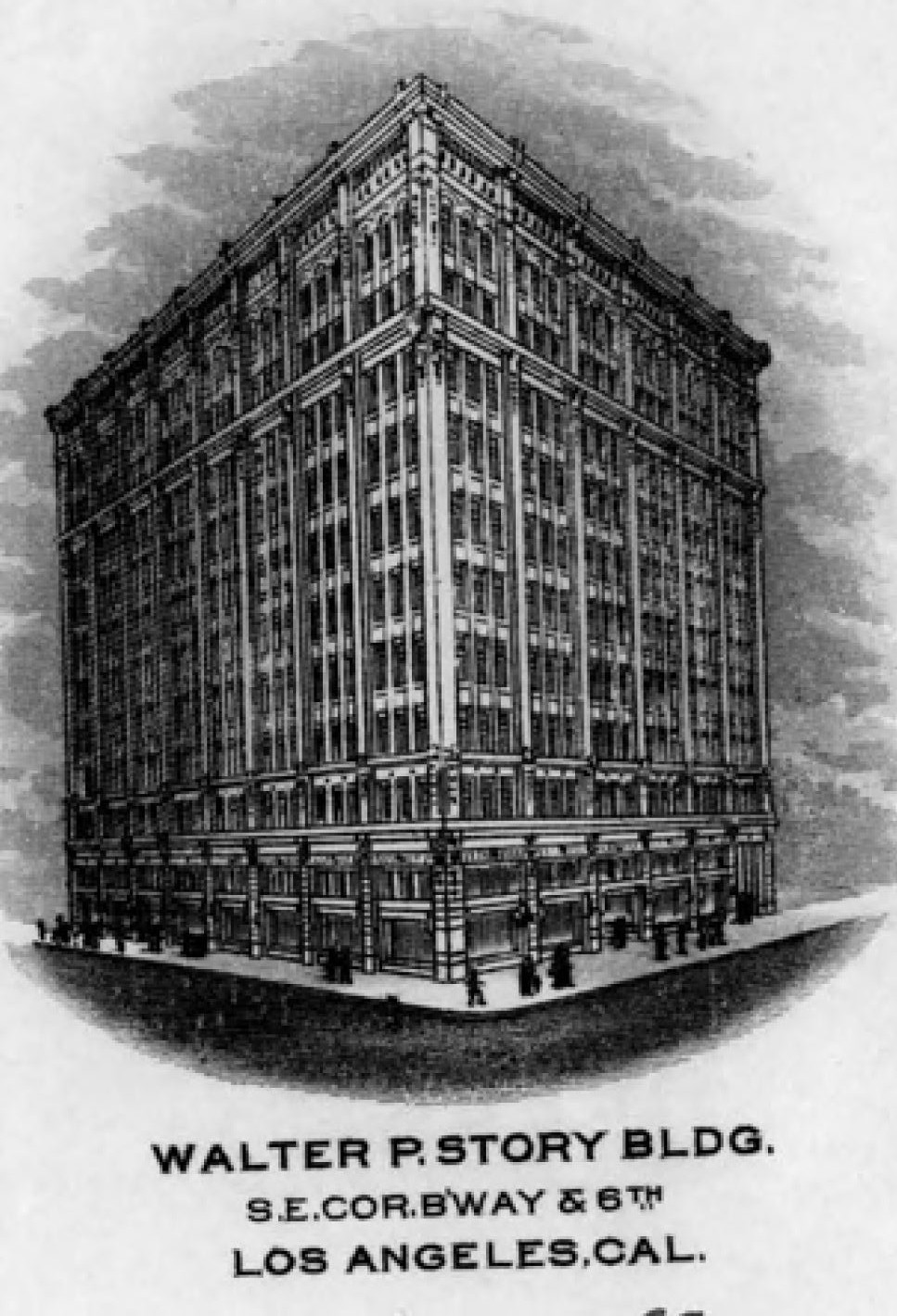
Walter P. Story Building, Los Angeles, California, 1911

In 1919, Nelson Jr. and T. Byron Story funded the construction of the Ellen Theater on Main Street Bozeman to honor their mother Ellen. The theater was designed by architect Fred F. Willson, son of Bozeman pioneer Lester S. Willson and still operates as a theater today.

In 1959, Nelson Story was inducted into the Hall of Great Westerners of the National Cowboy & Western Heritage Museum.

In 2008, Story was inducted into the Montana Cowboy Hall of Fame as a founding, Legacy member. Nelson and Ellen Story are buried in Sunset Hills Cemetery, Bozeman, Montana along with several of their children.

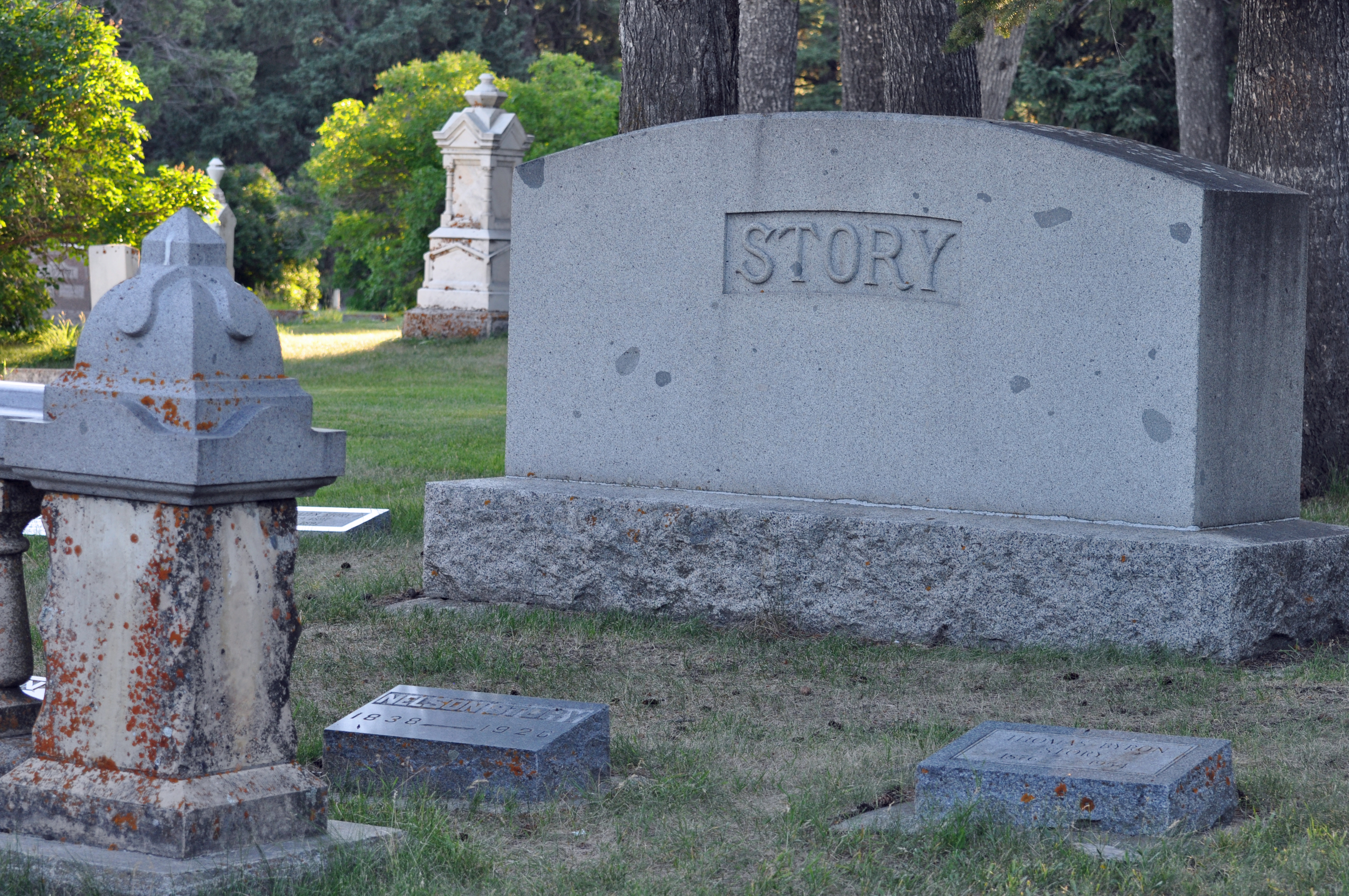
Story gravesite, Sunset Hills Cemetery, Bozeman

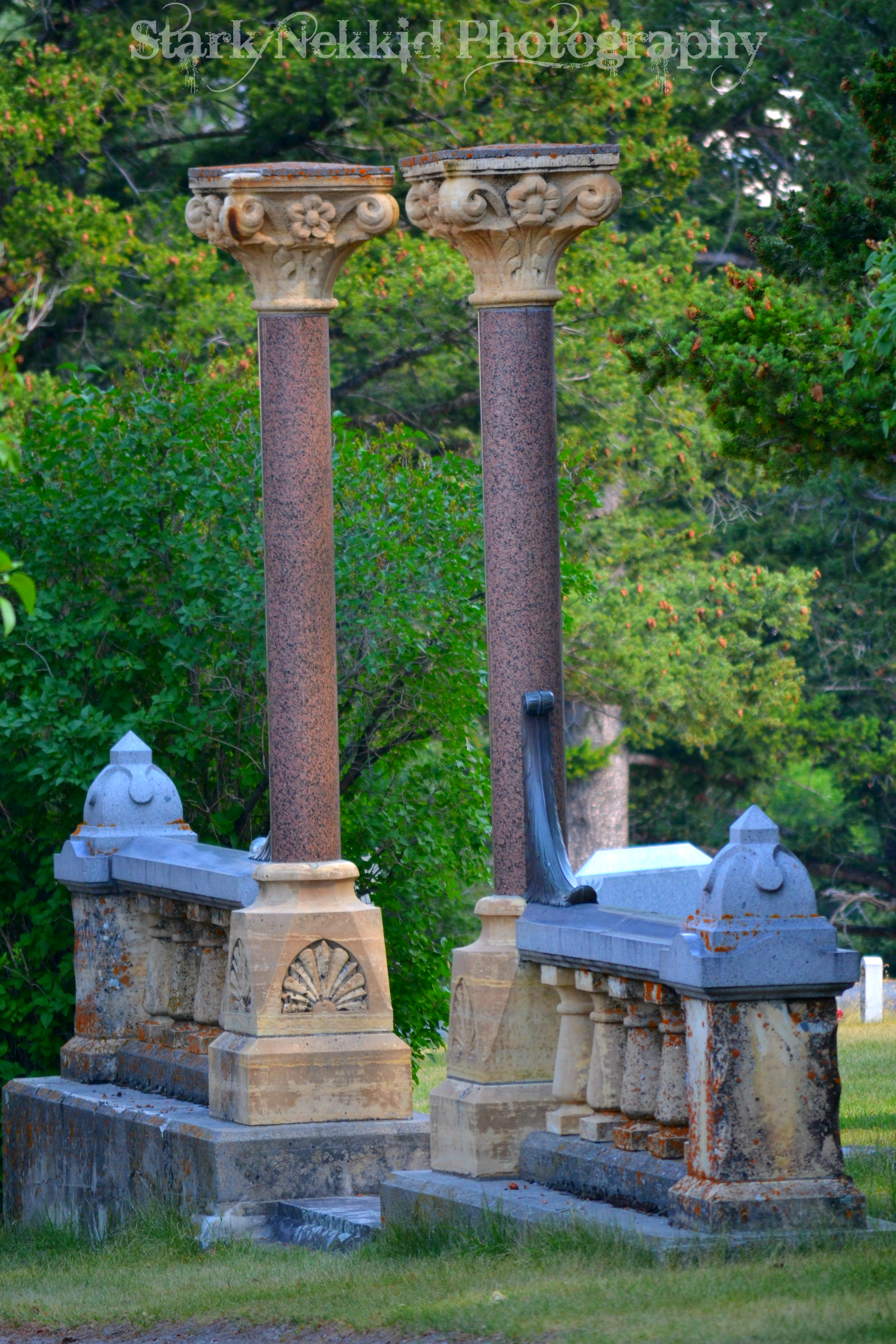
Entrance of family plot.

This photo is the marker to his family plot. These were once the marble front porch columns to his original house in Bozeman when it was built on Main Street. Strangers often wandered into the house because they thought it was the courthouse.

The 1960 novel Beyond the Bitterroots has Story questioned by local authorities about the alibi of a murder suspect.

The 2021 Michael Punke novel Ridgeline devotes several chapters to Story driving his first cattle herd through Cheyenne land to Bozeman.
