= Silver Run =

Silver Run may refer to:

- Silver Run (Delaware Bay tributary), in Delaware
- Silver Run, Carroll County, Maryland, an unincorporated community
- Silver Run, Wicomico County, Maryland, an unincorporated community
- Silver Run, Mississippi, an unincorporated community
- Silver Run, Ohio, an unincorporated community
- Silver Run (North Fork Hughes River), a stream in West Virginia
