= Apple Grove, Ohio =

- Unincorporated community
- Location within Ohio Location within the United States
- Coordinates: 38°53′12″N 81°52′03″W
- Country: United States
- State: Ohio
- County: Meigs
- Township: Letart
- Elevation: 600 ft (180 m)
- Time zone: UTC-5 (Eastern (EST))
  - Summer (DST): UTC-4 (EDT)
- ZIP Code: 45771 (Racine)
- Area code: 740
- GNIS feature ID: 1060825

Apple Grove is an unincorporated community in Meigs County, Ohio, United States. Apple Grove lies just across the Ohio River from Millwood, West Virginia.

== History ==
A post office called Apple Grove was established in 1850, and remained in operation until 1938. The community was named for an apple orchard near the original town site.

== Notable person ==
- Warren Miller, West Virginia congressman
