= Portland, Ohio =

Unincorporated community in Ohio, U.S.

Coordinates: 39°00′12″N 81°46′16″W

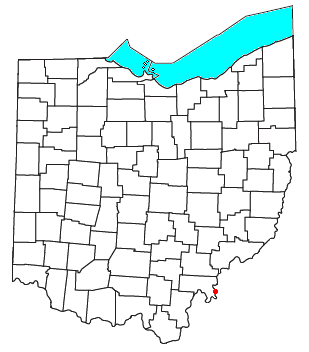
Location of Portland, Ohio

Portland is an unincorporated community in eastern Lebanon Township, Meigs County, Ohio, United States. It has a post office with the ZIP code 45770.

It lies on the Ohio River, located between Long Bottom and Racine.

== Education ==
Public education in the community of Portland is provided by the Southern Local School District. Campuses serving the community include Southern Elementary School (Grades K–8) and Southern High School (Grades 9–12).

== History ==
The area around this village was the scene of the only Civil War battle on Ohio soil. The conflict is known as the Battle of Buffington Island, and featured two future U.S. Presidents, Rutherford B. Hayes and William McKinley, both in the 23rd Ohio Volunteer Infantry.

== Climate ==
The climate in this area is characterized by relatively high temperatures and evenly distributed precipitation throughout the year. According to the Köppen Climate Classification system, Portland has a Humid subtropical climate, abbreviated "Cfa" on climate maps.
