= Mound Cemetery Mound (Chester, Ohio) =

Archaeological site in Ohio, United States

- U.S. National Register of Historic Places
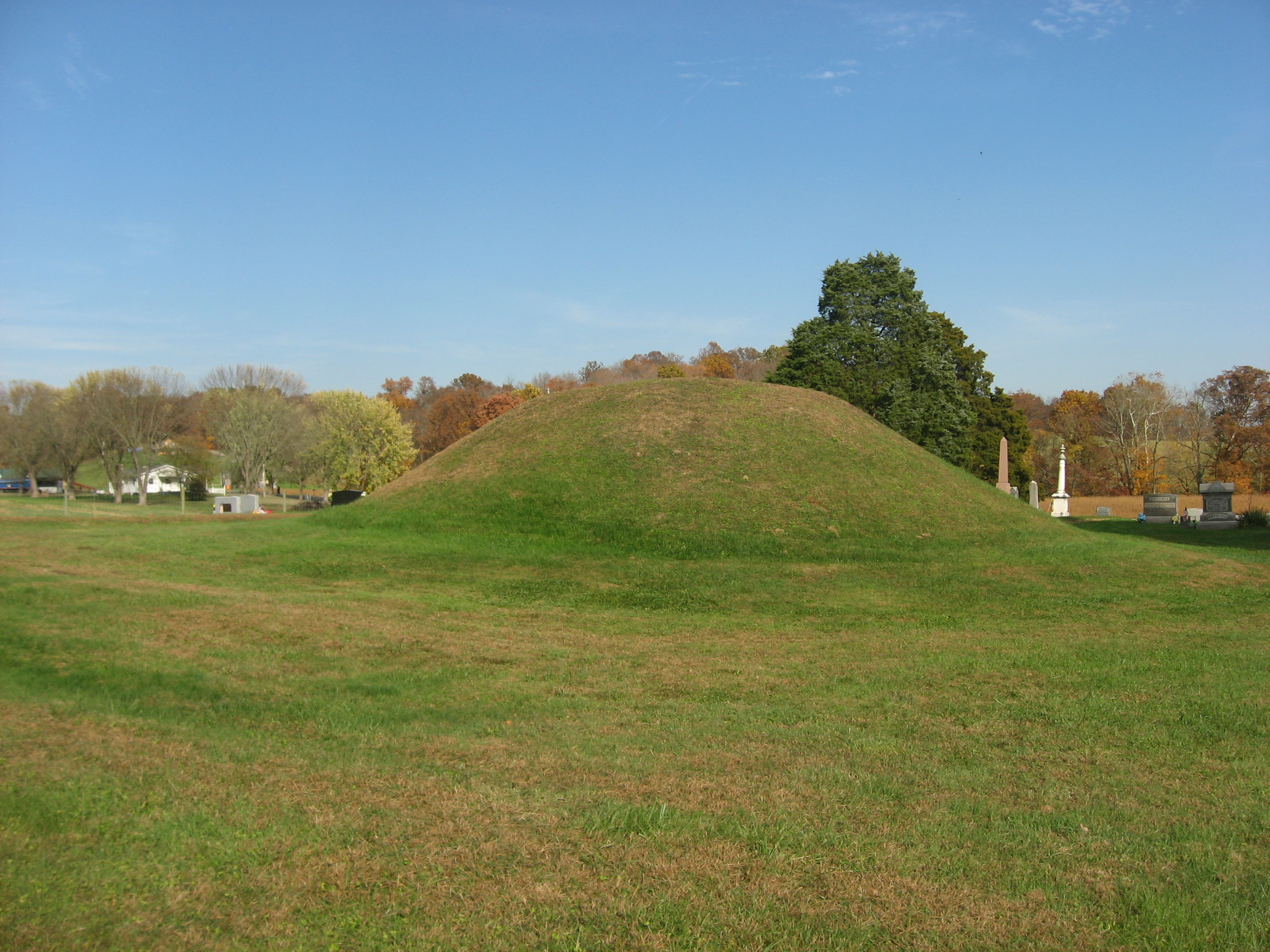
- Comprehensive view from the southwest

- Location within Ohio Location within the United States
- Location: Sumner Road, Chester Township
- Nearest city: Chester, Ohio, United States
- Coordinates: 39°6′48″N 81°55′24″W
- Area: 5 acres (2.0 ha)
- NRHP reference No.: 74001575
- Added to NRHP: May 2, 1974

The Mound Cemetery Mound is a Native American mound in central Meigs County, Ohio, United States. Located in the eponymous Mound Cemetery, the mound lies north of the community of Chester in Chester Township. Because the mound has never been excavated and the cemetery has cared for it, it remains in fine condition. Its location near the Middle Branch of the Shade River, and the existence of numerous similar mounds nearby at one time, suggests that it was built by the Adena people, who were active 800 BCE to 100 CE. They were Early Woodland peoples. The mound is likely to contain remnants of a wooden structure that served as the burial place for a prominent member of Adena society.

Many burial mounds still existed in present-day Meigs County when the area was first settled by European Americans. But many were destroyed by settlers who hoped to find treasures within. Some of these mounds yielded artifacts such as stone tools, pottery, and skeletons when opened. Other mounds were gradually destroyed by repeated plowing of farmers cultivating their fields for many years. The remains of what may have once been another mound and related earthworks can be found in the near vicinity of Mound Cemetery.

Another Adena mound, known as the Reeves Mound, is located in northern Meigs County north of the unincorporated community of Alfred. Unlike the mound remnants near the cemetery, the Mound Cemetery Mound and the Reeves Mound are recognized as significant archeological sites and both are listed on the National Register of Historic Places; both were added to the Register in 1974.
