= Southern Local School District (Meigs County) =

School district in Ohio, United States

Address
- 106 North Broadway Street Racine, Ohio, 45771; United States

District information
- Type: Public
- Grades: PK–12
- Schools: 2
- NCES District ID: 3904853

Students and staff
- Students: 680 (2024–2025)
- Teachers: 45.20 (on an FTE basis) (2024–2025)
- Staff: 157.50 (on an FTE basis) (2024–2025)
- Student–teacher ratio: 15.04 (2024–2025)

Other information
- Website: www.southernlocalmeigs.org

The Southern Local School District is a public school district based in Racine, Ohio, United States.

The school district includes all of Letart and Sutton townships as well as the central and southern portions of Lebanon Township.

Two incorporated villages, Racine and Syracuse, are served by Southern Local Schools. A notable unincorporated community in the district is Portland.

== Schools ==
- Southern High School (Grades 7–12)
- Southern Elementary School (Grades K-6)

== See also ==
- List of school districts in Ohio
