= Syracuse, Ohio =

- Village
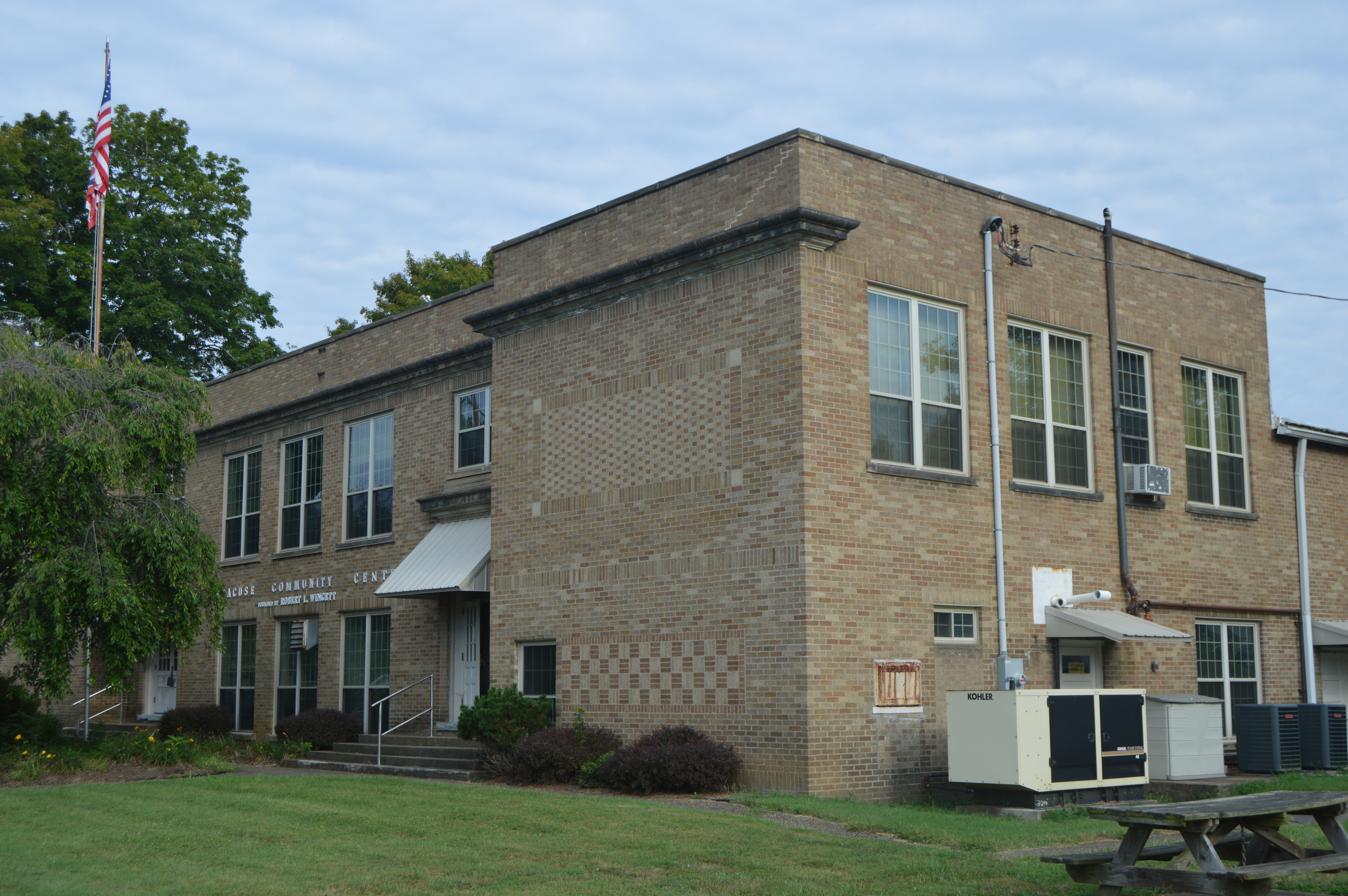
- Community center and former school

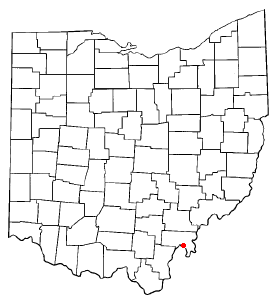
- Location of Syracuse, Ohio

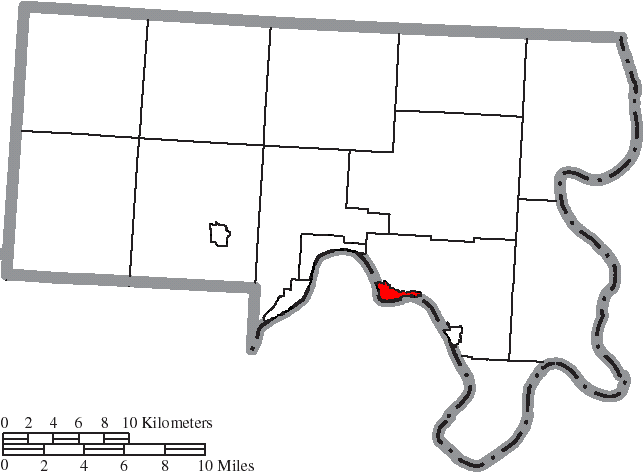
- Location of Syracuse in Meigs County
- Coordinates: 38°00′02″N 81°58′24″W
- Country: United States
- State: Ohio
- County: Meigs
- Township: Sutton

Area
  - Total: 0.90 sq mi (2.34 km^{2})
  - Land: 0.88 sq mi (2.28 km^{2})
  - Water: 0.023 sq mi (0.06 km^{2})
- Elevation: 640 ft (200 m)

Population (2020)
  - Total: 781
  - Density: 887.5/sq mi (342.66/km^{2})
- Time zone: UTC-5 (Eastern (EST))
  - Summer (DST): UTC-4 (EDT)
- ZIP code: 45779
- Area code: 740
- FIPS code: 39-76050
- GNIS feature ID: 2399945
- Website: https://www.syracuseohio.com/

Syracuse is a village in Meigs County, Ohio, United States, along the Ohio River. The population was 781 at the 2020 census.

== Geography ==
According to the United States Census Bureau, the village has a total area of 0.96 square miles (2.49 km^{2}), of which 0.93 square miles (2.41 km^{2}) is land and 0.03 square miles (0.08 km^{2}) is water.

== Demographics ==
Historical population
Census	Pop.	Note	%±
1860	720		—
1870	1,273		76.8%
1880	1,545		21.4%
1930	678		—
1940	676		−0.3%
1950	700		3.6%
1960	731		4.4%
1970	684		−6.4%
1980	946		38.3%
1990	827		−12.6%
2000	879		6.3%
2010	826		−6.0%
2020	781		−5.4%
U.S. Decennial Census

=== 2010 census ===
As of the census of 2010, there were 826 people, 360 households, and 248 families living in the village. The population density was 888.2 inhabitants per square mile (342.9/km^{2}). There were 418 housing units at an average density of 449.5 per square mile (173.6/km^{2}). The racial makeup of the village was 97.2% White, 0.8% African American, 0.4% Native American, 0.1% Asian, and 1.5% from two or more races. Hispanic or Latino of any race were 0.1% of the population.

There were 360 households, of which 29.4% had children under the age of 18 living with them, 49.2% were married couples living together, 13.9% had a female householder with no husband present, 5.8% had a male householder with no wife present, and 31.1% were non-families. 28.3% of all households were made up of individuals, and 14.7% had someone living alone who was 65 years of age or older. The average household size was 2.29 and the average family size was 2.75.

The median age in the village was 45.8 years. 20.3% of residents were under the age of 18; 7.1% were between the ages of 18 and 24; 21.4% were from 25 to 44; 29.3% were from 45 to 64; and 21.8% were 65 years of age or older. The gender makeup of the village was 47.6% male and 52.4% female.

=== 2000 census ===
As of the census of 2000, there were 879 people, 382 households, and 258 families living in the village. The population density was 952.8 inhabitants per square mile (367.9/km^{2}). There were 423 housing units at an average density of 458.5 per square mile (177.0/km^{2}). The racial makeup of the village was 97.84% White, 0.91% African American, 0.23% Native American, and 1.02% from two or more races. Hispanic or Latino of any race were 0.11% of the population.

There were 382 households, out of which 23.6% had children under the age of 18 living with them, 56.0% were married couples living together, 9.2% had a female householder with no husband present, and 32.2% were non-families. 28.8% of all households were made up of individuals, and 17.8% had someone living alone who was 65 years of age or older. The average household size was 2.30 and the average family size was 2.82.

In the village, the population was spread out, with 19.8% under the age of 18, 7.6% from 18 to 24, 24.6% from 25 to 44, 27.9% from 45 to 64, and 20.1% who were 65 years of age or older. The median age was 44 years. For every 100 females, there were 92.8 males. For every 100 females age 18 and over, there were 88.0 males.

The median income for a household in the village was $29,423, and the median income for a family was $37,813. Males had a median income of $41,389 versus $18,750 for females. The per capita income for the village was $19,279. About 11.8% of families and 15.5% of the population were below the poverty line, including 28.4% of those under age 18 and 8.0% of those age 65 or over.

== Education ==
Public education in the village of Syracuse is provided by the Southern Local School District. Campuses serving the village include Southern Elementary School (Grades K-8) and Southern High School (Grades 9-12).

== Notable person ==
- Rollie Hemsley, baseball player

== See also ==
- List of cities and towns along the Ohio River
