= Tuppers Plains, Ohio =

- Census-designated place
- Location within Ohio Location within the United States
- Country: United States
- State: Ohio
- County: Meigs
- Townships: Orange, Olive

Area
  - Total: 1.82 sq mi (4.7 km^{2})
  - Land: 1.82 sq mi (4.7 km^{2})
  - Water: 0.0 sq mi (0 km^{2})
- Elevation: 771 ft (235 m)

Population (2020)
  - Total: 438
  - Density: 241.2/sq mi (93.1/km^{2})
- Time zone: UTC-5 (Eastern (EST))
  - Summer (DST): UTC-4 (EDT)
- ZIP Codes: 45783; Tuppers Plains; 45772 (Reedsville)
- FIPS code: 39-77812
- GNIS feature ID: 2628980

Tuppers Plains is an unincorporated community and census-designated place (CDP) on the boundary of Olive and Orange townships in Meigs County, Ohio, United States. As of the 2020 census, Tuppers Plains had a population of 438.

== Geography ==
The community is in northeastern Meigs County, with slightly more of its area in Orange Township to the west, compared to the eastern portion within Olive Township. The main road through the center of the community, Ohio State Route 7, leads northeast 5 miles (8 km) to Coolville and southwest 16 miles (26 km) to Pomeroy, the Meigs county seat. Ohio State Route 681 crosses SR 7 in the center of Tuppers Plains, leading southeast 7 miles (11 km) to Reedsville on the Ohio River and west 11 miles (18 km) to U.S. Route 33 at Darwin.

According to the U.S. Census Bureau, the Tuppers Plains CDP has an area of 1.82 square miles (4.71 km^{2}), all land. The community sits on a ridge which drains east toward East Fourmile Creek, a tributary of the Hocking River just above its confluence with the Ohio River; and west toward Meigs Creek, a tributary of the East Branch of the Shade River, another tributary of the Ohio.

== Education ==
Public education in the community of Tuppers Plains is provided by the Eastern Local School District. Campuses serving the community include the Eastern Elementary School (Grades K-8) and Eastern High School of Reedsville (Grades 9–12).

== Notable people ==
- George Willis Ritchey, telescope maker and astronomer
