= Long Bottom, Ohio =

Unincorporated community in Ohio, U.S.

Coordinates: 39°05′10″N 81°48′13″W

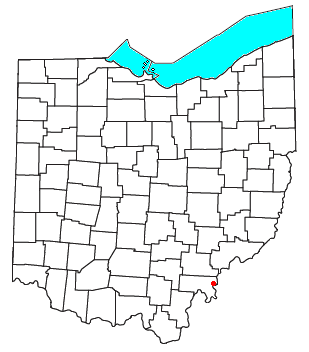
Location of Long Bottom, Ohio

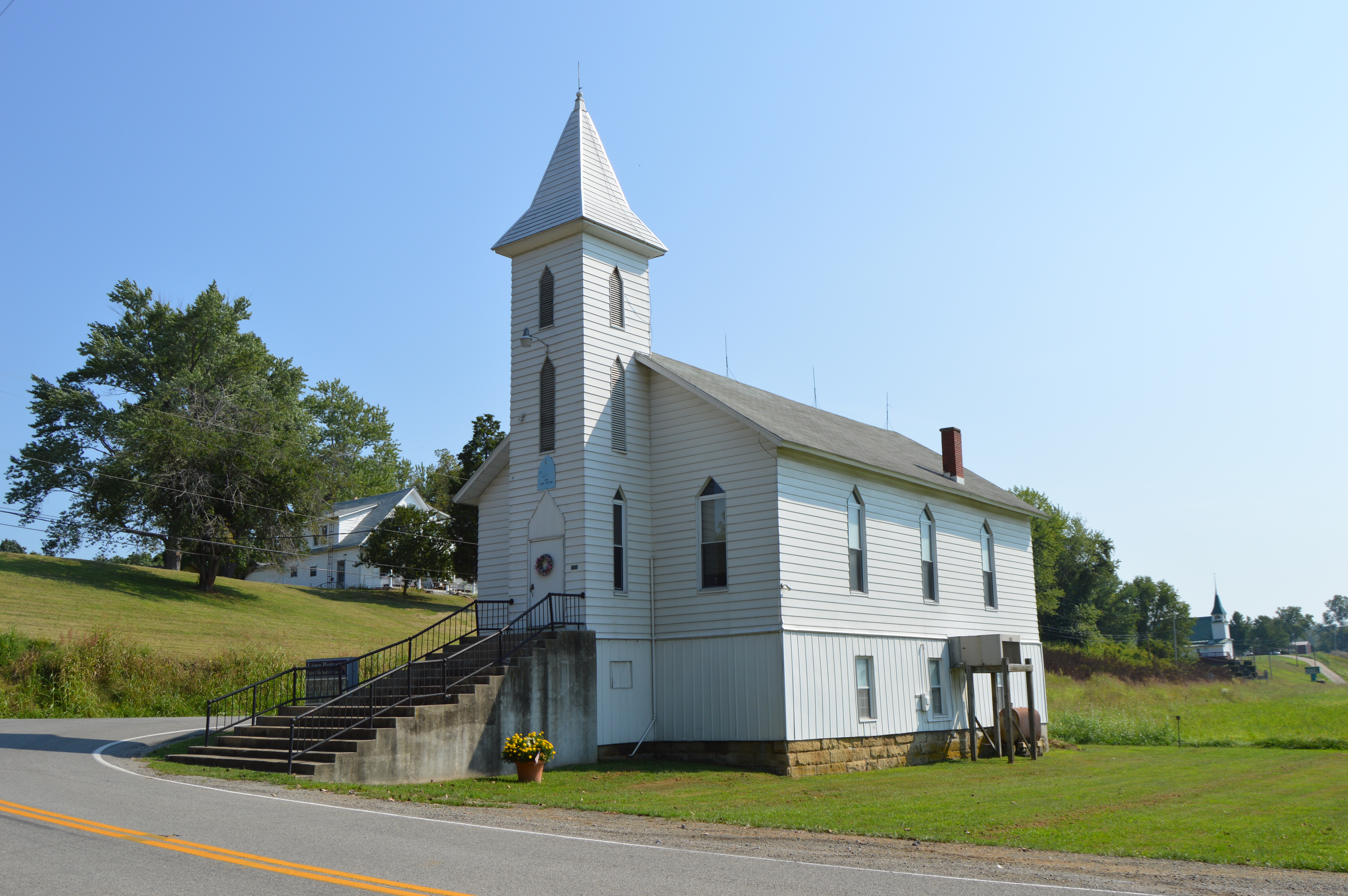
Long Bottom United Methodist Church

Long Bottom is an unincorporated community in southern Olive Township, Meigs County, Ohio, United States. It has a post office with the ZIP code 45743.

It lies on the Ohio River, located between Reedsville and Portland.

The community was named for a river bottom near the original town site.

== Education ==
Public education in the community of Long Bottom is provided by the Eastern Local School District. Campuses serving the community include Eastern Elementary School (Grades K–8) and Eastern High School (Grades 9–12).
