= Warren Miller (West Virginia politician) =

American judge

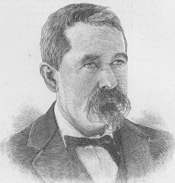

Member of the U.S. House of Representatives from West Virginia's 4th district
- In office March 4, 1895 – March 3, 1899
- Preceded by: James Capehart
- Succeeded by: Romeo H. Freer

Judge for the 5th Circuit
- In office 1902–1903

Judge West Virginia Court of Appeals
- In office 1903–1904

Member of the West Virginia Senate
- In office 1914–1918

Personal details
- Born: April 2, 1847 Apple Grove, Ohio, US
- Died: December 29, 1920 (aged 73) Ripley, West Virginia, US
- Party: Republican Party
- Education: Ohio University
- Occupation: Attorney

Warren Miller (April 2, 1847 – December 29, 1920) was a lawyer and Republican politician from West Virginia who served as a United States representative in the 54th and 55th United States Congresses, as well as both houses of the West Virginia legislature Senate and on the West Virginia Supreme Court of Appeals.

== Early and family life ==
Miller was born at Apple Grove in Meigs County, Ohio. Around 1850, his family moved to Millwood, Virginia in Jackson County, in what later became West Virginia, and he received a private education suitable for his class, since Virginia had no public schools at the time. He graduated from the Ohio University at Athens.

== Career ==
Miller taught school and studied law. He was admitted to the bar and commenced practice in Ripley, West Virginia the county seat, in 1871. He also served as mayor of Ripley in 1871. He became prosecuting attorney for Jackson County and nearby Wirt and Roane counties in 1878 and served until 1890. He was chosen to be a delegate to the 1884 Republican National Convention. He was a member of the West Virginia House of Delegates in 1890 and 1891.

in 1892, his bid to become a judge of the State Supreme Court failed. However, three years later Miller won election to the Fifty-fourth and Fifty-fifth Congresses (March 4, 1895 – March 3, 1899), he was not a candidate for renomination in 1898. He returned to the practice of law and also farmed.

Judge Miller was appointed to the Fifth Judicial Circuit Court of West Virginia, then elected to the court in 1902 and 1903 and 1904 served on the West Virginia Supreme Court of Appeals. He won election to the West Virginia Senate and served from 1914 to 1918.

== Death and legacy ==
Judge Miller died in Ripley, and was buried in Cottageville Cemetery in Cottageville, West Virginia, both in Jackson County.

== See also ==
- West Virginia's congressional delegations

U.S. House of Representatives
Preceded by James Capehart	Member of the U.S. House of Representatives from West Virginia's 4th congressional district March 4, 1895 – March 4, 1899	Succeeded by Romeo H. Freer
Legal offices
Preceded by New seat	Justice for the Supreme Court of Appeals of West Virginia; Jan. 17, 1903 – Dec. 31, 1904	Succeeded by Joseph M. Sanders
