= Salem Center =

Salem Center may refer to:

- Salem Center, Indiana, an unincorporated community
- Salem Center, Ohio, an unincorporated community
- Salem Center (Oregon), a shopping mall in Salem, Oregon
- Salem Center, New York, a hamlet within North Salem
- A fictional location in the X-Men universe
