= Reeves Mound =

Reeves Mound may refer to:

- Reeves Mound (Alfred, Ohio), listed on the NRHP in Ohio
- Reeves Mound (Stringtown, Kentucky), listed on the NRHP in Kentucky
