= Carletonville, Ohio =

Unincorporated community in Ohio, U.S.

Coordinates: 39°00′38″N 81°59′06″W

Carletonville is an unincorporated community in Meigs County, in the U.S. state of Ohio.

== History ==
The community derives its name from Isaac Carleton, who started a school there in the 1860s.
