= Mountaineer Power Plant =

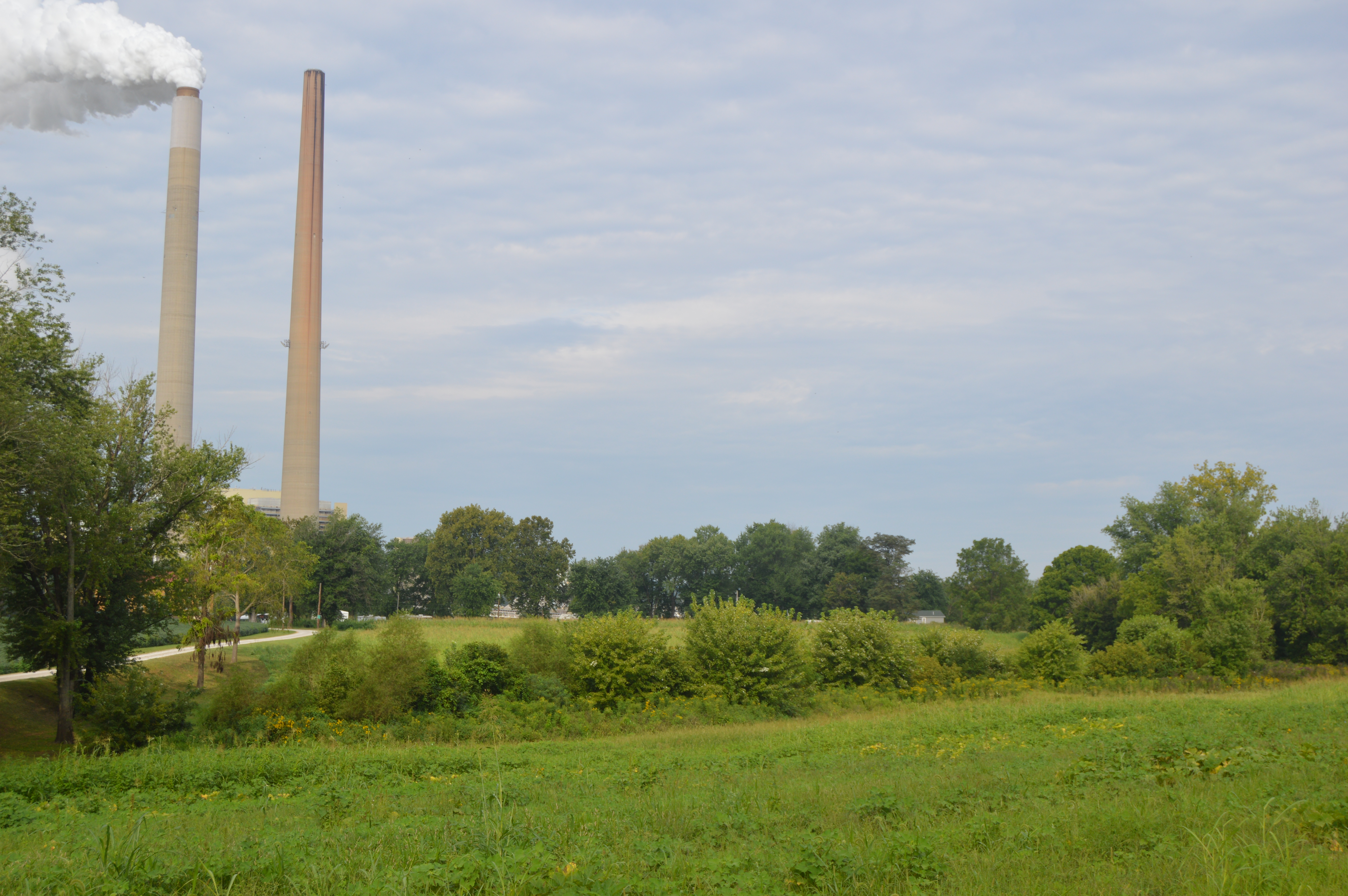
- Chimneys, seen from Sutton Township, Meigs County, Ohio
- Country: United States
- Location: Mason County, near New Haven, West Virginia
- Coordinates: 38°58′42″N 81°56′08″W
- Status: Operational
- Commission date: September 1980
- Owner: American Electric Power

Thermal power station
- Primary fuel: Bituminous coal
- Turbine technology: Steam turbine
- Cooling source: Closed cycle, make-up water from Ohio River

Power generation
- Units operational: 1
- Nameplate capacity: 1300 MW

The Mountaineer Power Plant is a major coal-fired power plant outside New Haven, West Virginia, USA. Owned by American Electric Power (AEP), it has one of the tallest chimneys in the world at 336 metres (1,102 ft). This chimney was built as part of the plant in 1980 and is not in use now. It has been replaced by a slightly shorter and wider chimney for the electrostatic precipitator and scrubber units.

The AEP Mountaineer Plant is what is known as a 1300 megawatt plant. The actual total capacity of the plant's two turbines is around 1480 MW, and the plant averages around 1420 MW. 1300 MW is the net power that actually leaves the plant, whereas the difference between the turbine output and the 1300 MW is required to run the plant itself. It is a "closed-loop" plant in that it recycles the cooling water used, however it requires approximately 20,000 US gallons (76 m^{3}) per hour of "make up" water to be drawn from the Ohio River to replace the water that is lost in water vapor through the cooling tower and the precipitator/scrubber chimney.

The plant burns an average of 9,000 tons (8,200 metric tons) of coal per day, and some of that coal now comes via barge on the Ohio River to an elaborate coal unloading and storage facility. The other portion of coal comes from Big River Mining. An underground coal mine (The Mine Closed in 2010) right across the street from the plant. It is mined, cleaned, processed, and shipped by a belt line across the street to the power plant. This single boiler, dual turbine plant produces enough energy to power a city approximately the size of Columbus, Ohio. The plant is connected to the grid by 765 kilovolt transmission lines (the highest rated voltage used in the United States).

The location of the plant is routinely given as New Haven, West Virginia, yet sits just outside the town limits. The plant actually sits on land that was originally known as Graham Station. The next-door Phillip Sporn AEP plant and the Mountaineer Plant seem to cover most of the land of the former Graham Station, thus Graham Station is seldom used as a locale.

== Clean coal project ==
There were plans to outfit the plant with technology that uses chilled ammonia to trap carbon dioxide. The greenhouse gas would then be turned into a liquid and injected into the ground. It would have been the first such project that will both capture and store carbon from an existing power plant. A successful pilot project was built using the new technology which removed 100,000 to 300,000 metric tons of carbon dioxide of the 8.5 million tons emitted annually by the Mountaineer plant. According to The New York Times, AEP and the maker of the technology, Alstom, spent $100 million on the initiative. However, the political climate had changed by July, 2011 and the project was abandoned due to diminishing federal and state support for clean coal technology.

== See also ==
- List of power stations
