= George Willis Ritchey =

American optician, telescope maker and astronomer

- Ritchey at the Fourth Conference International Union for Cooperation in Solar Research at Mount Wilson Observatory, 1910
- Born: 31 December 1864; Tuppers Plains, Ohio
- Died: 4 November 1945 (aged 80)
- Awards: Prix Jules Janssen
- Scientific career
- Fields: Optician astronomy

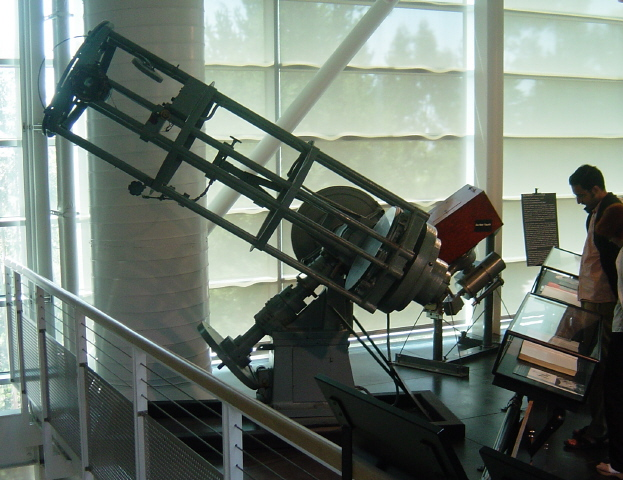
Ritchey 24" reflecting Telescope

George Willis Ritchey (December 31, 1864 – November 4, 1945) was an American optician and telescope maker and astronomer born at Tuppers Plains, Ohio.

Ritchey was educated as a furniture maker. He coinvented the Ritchey–Chrétien (R–C) reflecting telescope along with Henri Chrétien. The R-C prescription remains the predominant optical design for telescopes and has since been used for the majority of major ground-based and space-based telescopes.

He worked closely with George Ellery Hale, first at Yerkes Observatory and later at Mt. Wilson Observatory. He played a major role in designing the mountings and making the mirrors of the Mt. Wilson 60-inch (1.5 m) and 100-inch (2.5 m) telescopes. Hale and Ritchey had a falling-out in 1919, and Ritchey eventually went to Paris where he promoted the construction of very large telescopes. He returned to America in 1930 and obtained a contract to build a Ritchey-Chrétien telescope for the U.S. Naval Observatory. This last telescope produced by Ritchey remains in operation at the U.S. Naval Observatory Flagstaff Station in Flagstaff, Arizona.

In 1924, he received the Prix Jules Janssen, the highest award of the Société astronomique de France, the French astronomical society. Craters on Mars and the Moon were named in his honor.

A very readable biography of Ritchey and Hale is in Don Osterbrock's book "Pauper and Prince - Ritchey, Hale and the Big American Telescopes" (The university of Arizona Press, 1993) where the idiosyncratic personalities of both Ritchey and Hale are exposed.

== See also ==
- List of astronomical instrument makers
