= Success, Ohio =

Unincorporated community in Ohio, U.S.

Coordinates: 39°08′06″N 81°49′56″W

Success is an unincorporated community in Meigs County, in the U.S. state of Ohio.

== History ==
A post office called Success was established in 1892, and remained in operation until 1907.
