= Spiller, Ohio =

Unincorporated community in Ohio, U.S.

Coordinates: 38°59′37″N 81°50′23″W

Spiller is an unincorporated community in Meigs County, in the U.S. state of Ohio.

== History ==
A post office called "Spiller", was established in 1893, and remained in operation until 1918. Spiller had its own schoolhouse until 1951.
