= Reeves Mound (Alfred, Ohio) =

Archaeological site in Ohio, United States

- U.S. National Register of Historic Places
- Nearest city: Alfred, Ohio
- Area: 2 acres (0.81 ha)
- NRHP reference No.: 74001574
- Added to NRHP: July 15, 1974

The Reeves Mound is a Native American mound in the southeastern part of the U.S. state of Ohio. Located north of the unincorporated community of Alfred, the mound is part of an archaeological site that appears to have been built by peoples of the Adena culture.

Located in a farm field, the Reeves Mound is an oval 3.3 feet (1.0 m) high; it measures approximately 42 feet (13 m) from east to west and approximately 45 feet (14 m) from north to south. The fields around the mound have yielded stone chips and projectile points that are characteristic of the Adena culture. Among these points is one of the distinctive form known as a "bird point".

It appears that the Adena used the mound and its surrounding area for hundreds of years; some of the points are typical of the early years of the Adena culture, which dates from circa 1000 BC, while others appear to date from the culture's late period, circa 400 AD.

In recognition of its archaeological value, the Reeves Mound was listed on the National Register of Historic Places in 1974. The Mound Cemetery Mound near Chester to the south, also in Meigs County, is also listed on the NRHP.
