= Kingsbury, Ohio =

Unincorporated community in Ohio, U.S.

Coordinates: 39°06′41″N 82°00′21″W

Kingsbury is an unincorporated community in Meigs County, in the U.S. state of Ohio.

== History ==
A post office called Kingsbury was established in 1866, and remained in operation until 1911. The community was named for one Mr. Kingsbury, a pioneer settler.
