= Welsh, Ohio =

Unincorporated community in Ohio, U.S.

Coordinates: 39°09′02″N 82°10′23″W

Welsh is an unincorporated community in Meigs County, in the U.S. state of Ohio.

Welsh is located along State Route 143, near the Welsh Farm, and is named after the Welsh family that settled in the area. Rev. TA Welsh moved to Meigs County in the mid-1840s. He came to serve as pastor of the Alexander Presbyterian Church, and later was an integral part of establishing the Harrisonville Presbyterian Church, where some of his descendants still attend. During his life, Welsh served in the Ohio State House of Representatives and Ohio State Senate. His home also served as a stop on the Underground Railroad.

== History ==
A post office called Welsh was established in 1898, and remained in operation until 1907. A share of the early settlers of Meigs County were of Welsh extraction.
