= Letart Falls, Ohio =

Unincorporated community in Ohio, U.S.

Coordinates: 38°53′34″N 81°55′26″W

Letart Falls is an unincorporated community in Meigs County, in the U.S. state of Ohio.

== History ==
A post office called Letart Falls was established in 1826, and remained in operation until 1959. There were formerly falls on the Ohio River at this point.
