= Burlingham, Ohio =

Unincorporated community in Ohio, U.S.

Burlingham
- Nickname: Bungtown
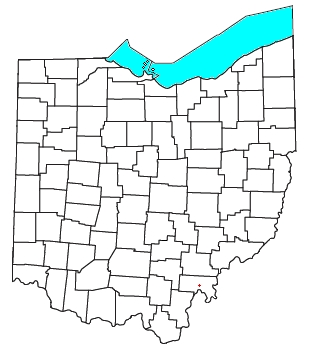
- Location of Burlingham, Ohio indicated on Ohio map.
- Coordinates: 39°10′01″N 82°01′16″W
- Country: United States
- State: Ohio
- County: Meigs
- Named for: Area's first posmaster
- Elevation: 669 ft (204 m)
- Time zone: UTC-5 (Eastern (EST))
  - Summer (DST): UTC-4 (EDT)
- ZIP code: 45776
- Area code: 740

Burlingham is an unincorporated community in northern Bedford Township, Meigs County, Ohio, United States named for the area's first postmaster. Burlingham allegedly received the nickname of "Bungtown" in the late 1800s when the local women became upset with their husbands for spending too much time at the local saloon and knocked all of the bungs out of the whiskey barrels. The escaping liquor was then used to burn down the saloon.

Burlingham's nickname lends its name to the Bungtown Salsa Company, which is located in nearby Shade, Ohio. The structure fire also gets recognition in the company's Fatalii Saloon Burner hot sauce.

Fifth anniversary limited edition bottle of Bungtown Fatali Saloon Burner hot sauce
