= Chester, Ohio =

Unincorporated community in Ohio, U.S.

Coordinates: 39°05′15″N 81°55′21″W

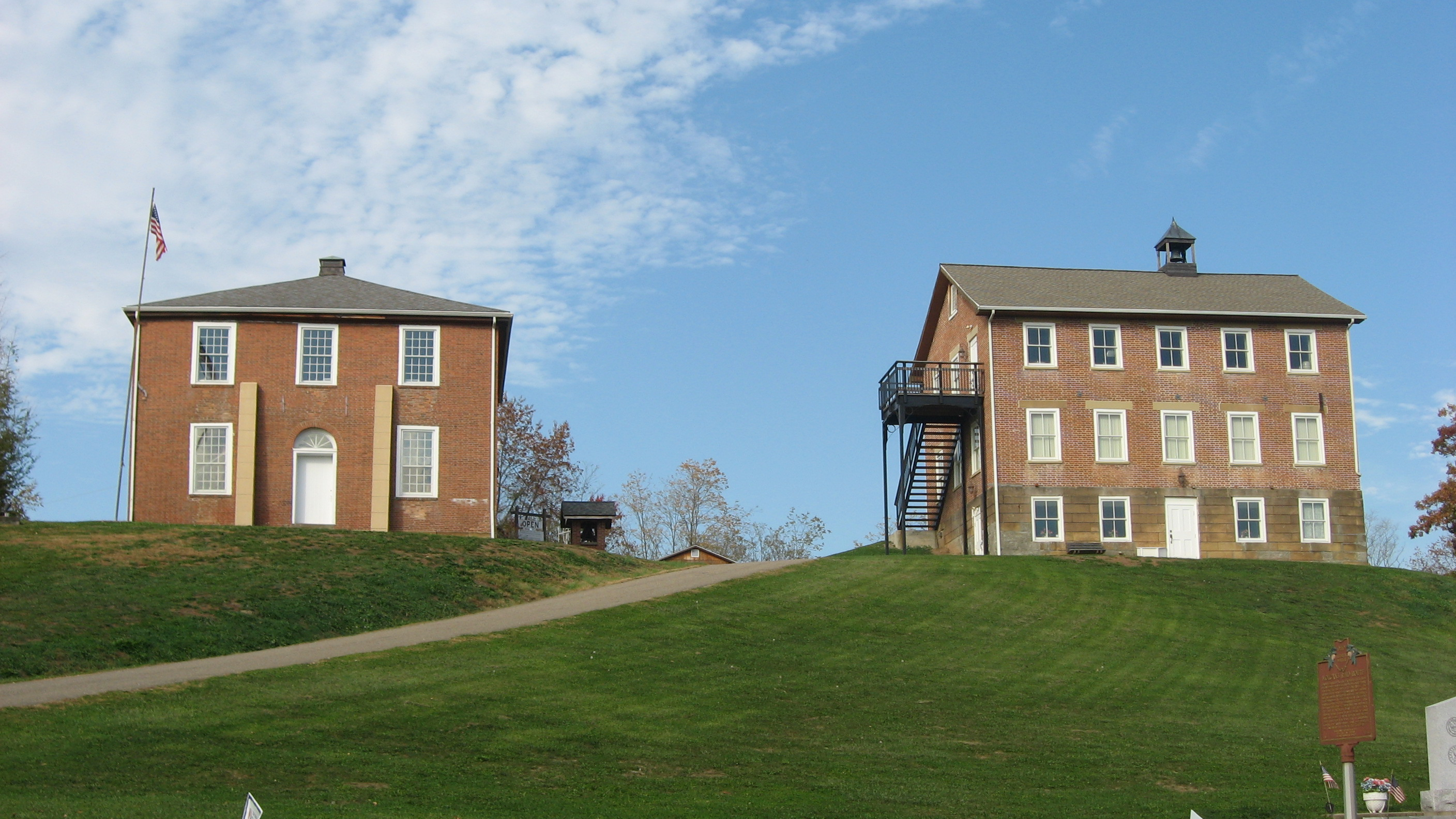
The Old Meigs County Courthouse and Chester Academy

Chester is an unincorporated community in central Chester Township, Meigs County, Ohio, United States. It lies along the Shade River at the intersection of State Routes 7 and 248. It has a post office with the ZIP code 45720.

== History ==
Chester was platted in about 1822 as the original seat of Meigs County. The county seat was removed to Pomeroy in 1841. The Old Meigs County Courthouse still stands in Chester and is listed on the National Register of Historic Places. A post office has been in operation at Chester since 1823.

== Education ==
Public education in the community of Chester is provided by the Eastern Local School District. Campuses serving the community include Eastern Elementary School (Grades K–8) and Eastern High School (Grades 9–12).

== Notable people ==
Noted American author Ambrose Bierce was born just downstream of Chester in the Shade River valley.
