= Olive Township, Meigs County, Ohio =

Township in Ohio, US

- Township
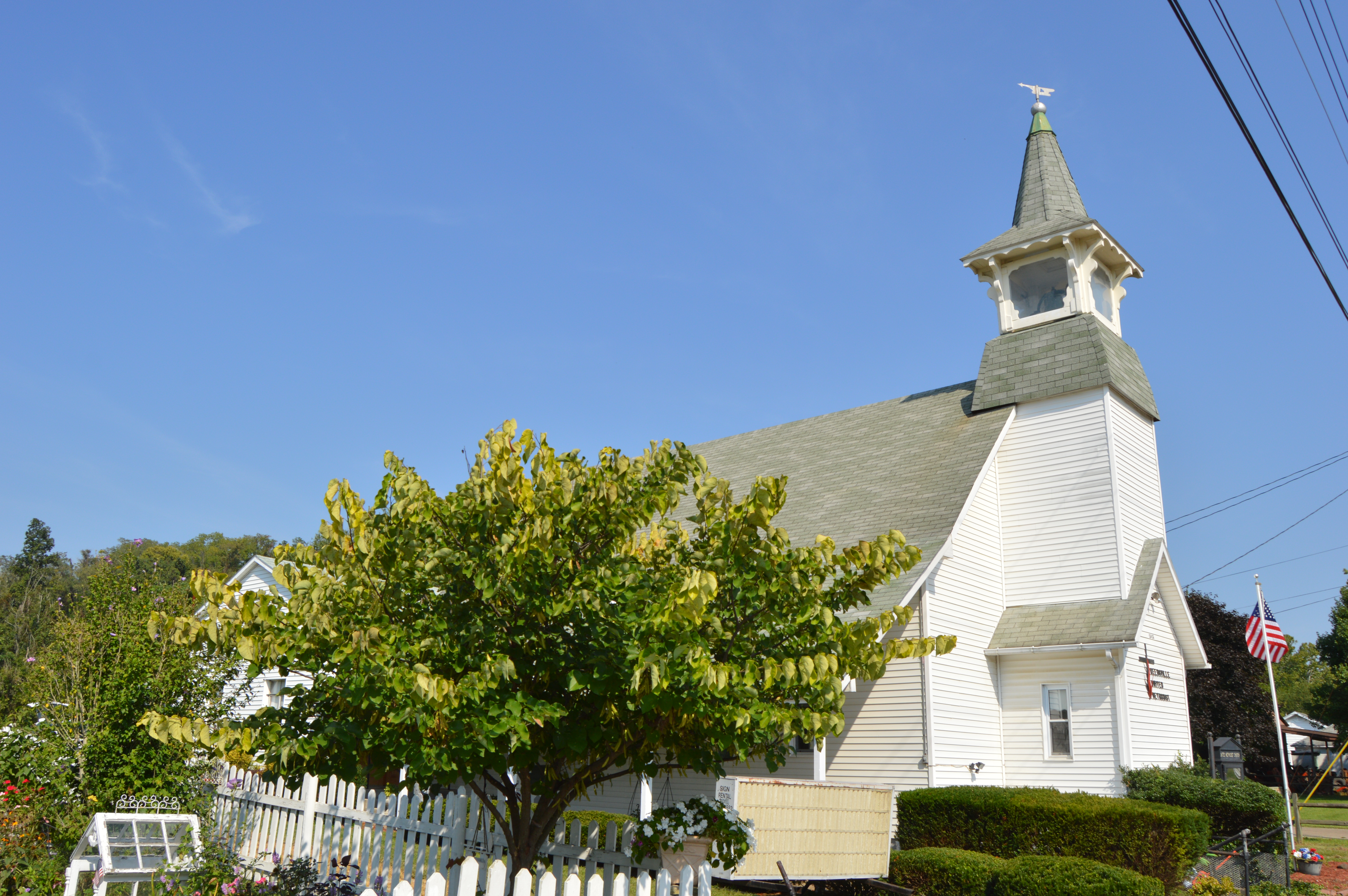
- Reedsville Methodist Church

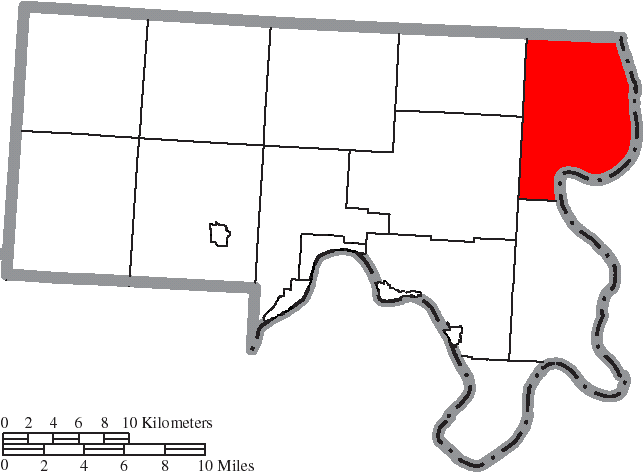
- Location of Olive Township in Meigs County
- Coordinates: 39°7′14″N 81°48′11″W
- Country: United States
- State: Ohio
- County: Meigs

Area
  - Total: 39.6 sq mi (102.5 km^{2})
  - Land: 38.9 sq mi (100.7 km^{2})
  - Water: 0.69 sq mi (1.8 km^{2})
- Elevation: 833 ft (254 m)

Population (2020)
  - Total: 1,651
  - Density: 42.46/sq mi (16.40/km^{2})
- Time zone: UTC-5 (Eastern (EST))
  - Summer (DST): UTC-4 (EDT)
- FIPS code: 39-58282
- GNIS feature ID: 1086613

Olive Township is one of the twelve townships of Meigs County, Ohio, United States. The 2020 census found 1,651 people in the township.

== Geography ==
Located in the northeastern corner of the county, it borders the following townships:

- Troy Township, Athens County - north
- Lebanon Township - south
- Chester Township - southwest
- Orange Township - west
- Carthage Township, Athens County - northwest corner

West Virginia lies across the Ohio River to the east: Wood County to the northeast, and Jackson County to the southeast.

It is the farthest upstream of Meigs County's Ohio River townships.

No municipalities are located in Olive Township, but three unincorporated communities lie there:

- Long Bottom, in the far south
- Reedsville, along the eastern shoreline
- Tuppers Plains, in the far northwest

== Name and history ==
Statewide, the only other Olive Township is located in Noble County.

== Government ==
The township is governed by a three-member board of trustees, who are elected in November of odd-numbered years to a four-year term beginning on the following January 1. Two are elected in the year after the presidential election and one is elected in the year before it. There is also an elected township fiscal officer, who serves a four-year term beginning on April 1 of the year after the election, which is held in November of the year before the presidential election. Vacancies in the fiscal officership or on the board of trustees are filled by the remaining trustees.
