= Southern High School (Racine, Ohio) =

Location
- 920 Elm Street; Racine, Ohio 45771; United States; 38°58′14″N 81°54′30″W

Information
- Type: Public high school
- School district: Southern Local School District
- Superintendent: Tony Deem
- Principal: Daniel Otto
- Grades: 9-12
- Colors: Purple & Gold
- Athletics conference: Tri-Valley Conference
- Team name: Tornadoes
- Athletic Director: Alan Crisp
- Website: 7-12.southernlocalmeigs.org/o/712

Southern High School is a public high school in Racine, (Meigs County), Ohio, United States. It is the only high school in the Southern Local School District. Their mascot is the Tornado, and their official school colors are Purple and Gold.

== Athletics ==
The Tornadoes belong to the Ohio High School Athletic Association (OHSAA) and the Tri-Valley Conference, a 13-member athletic conference located in southeastern Ohio. The conference is divided into two divisions based on school size. The Ohio Division features the larger schools (7) and the Hocking Division features the smaller schools (6), including Southern.

Rival: Reedsville Eastern Eagles

Football (7-12), Basketball (7-12), Baseball/Softball (9-12), Volleyball (7-12), Golf, Track, and Cross Country.

== See also ==
- Ohio High School Athletic Conferences
