= Orange Township, Meigs County, Ohio =

Township in Ohio, US

- Township
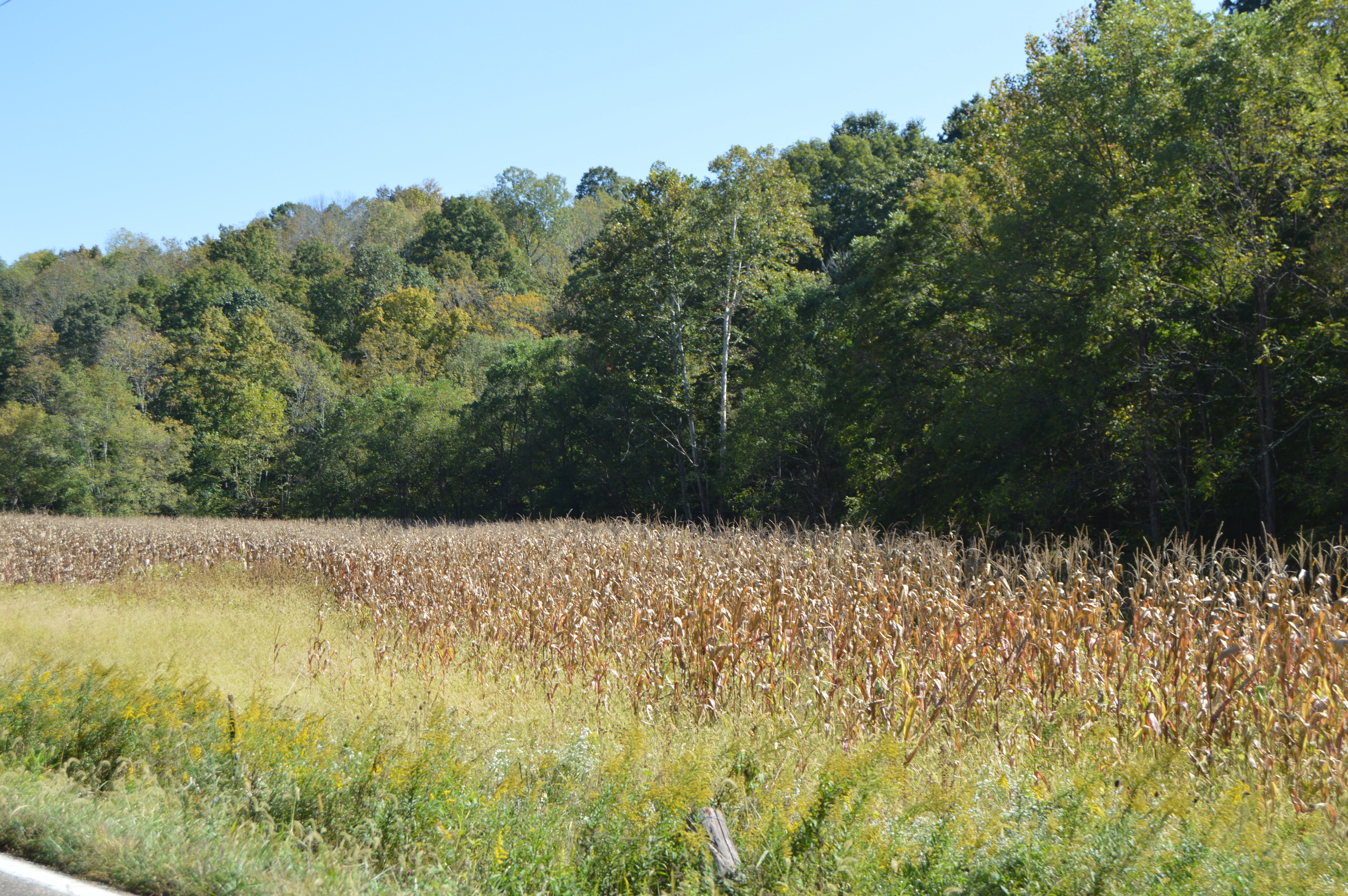
- Fields on State Route 681 west of Alfred

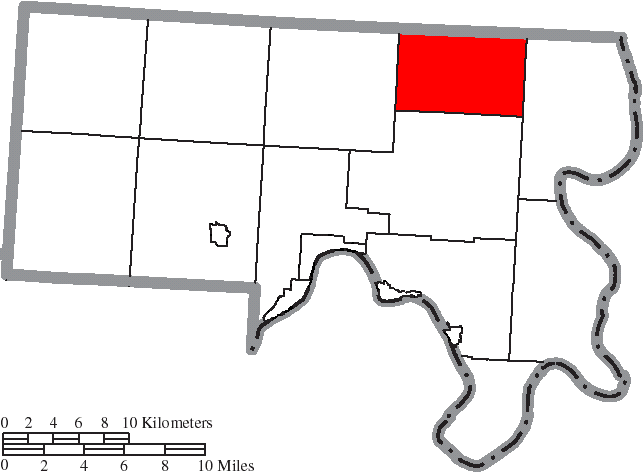
- Location of Orange Township in Meigs County
- Coordinates: 39°9′56″N 81°54′3″W
- Country: United States
- State: Ohio
- County: Meigs

Area
  - Total: 25.8 sq mi (66.8 km^{2})
  - Land: 25.8 sq mi (66.7 km^{2})
  - Water: 0.039 sq mi (0.1 km^{2})
- Elevation: 745 ft (227 m)

Population (2020)
  - Total: 1,085
  - Density: 42.1/sq mi (16.3/km^{2})
- Time zone: UTC-5 (Eastern (EST))
  - Summer (DST): UTC-4 (EDT)
- FIPS code: 39-58646
- GNIS feature ID: 1086614

Orange Township is one of the twelve townships of Meigs County, Ohio, United States. The 2020 census found 1,085 people in the township.

== Geography ==
Located in the northern part of the county, it borders the following townships:

- Carthage Township, Athens County - north
- Troy Township, Athens County - northeast corner
- Olive Township - east
- Chester Township - south
- Bedford Township - west
- Lodi Township, Athens County - northwest corner

No municipalities are located in Orange Township, although the census-designated place of Tuppers Plains lies along the border with Olive Township in the far northeast.

== Name and history ==
It is one of six Orange Townships statewide.

== Government ==
The township is governed by a three-member board of trustees, who are elected in November of odd-numbered years to a four-year term beginning on the following January 1. Two are elected in the year after the presidential election and one is elected in the year before it. There is also an elected township fiscal officer, who serves a four-year term beginning on April 1 of the year after the election, which is held in November of the year before the presidential election. Vacancies in the fiscal officership or on the board of trustees are filled by the remaining trustees.
