= Chester Township, Meigs County, Ohio =

Township in Ohio, US

- Township
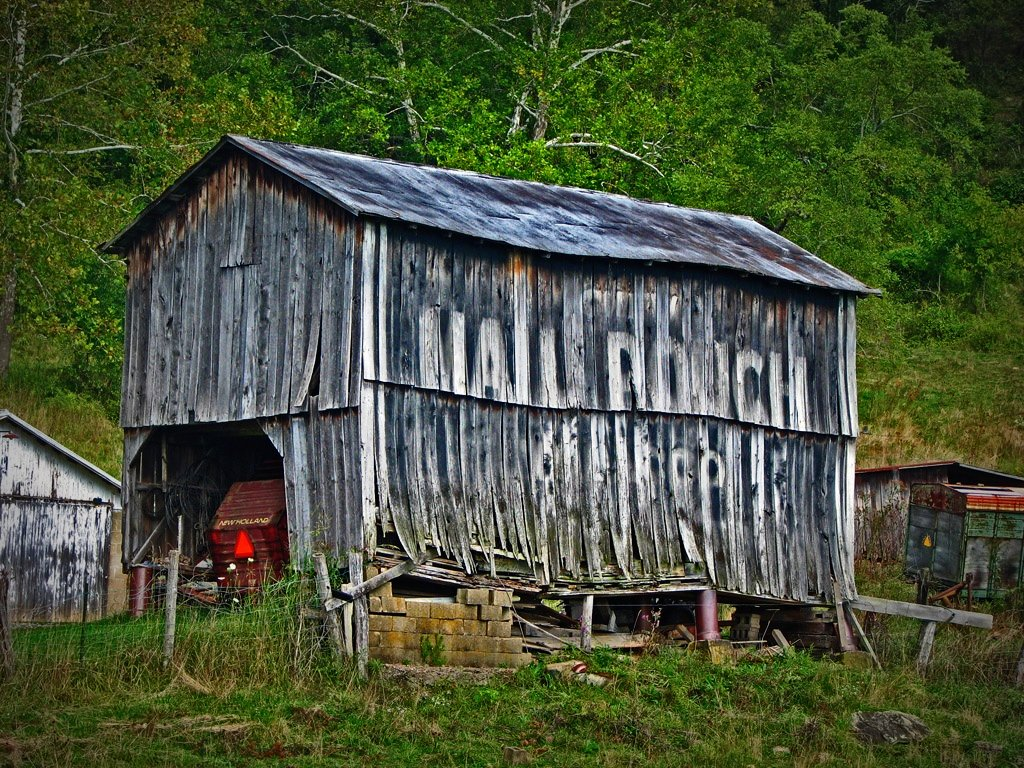
- Barn in the township

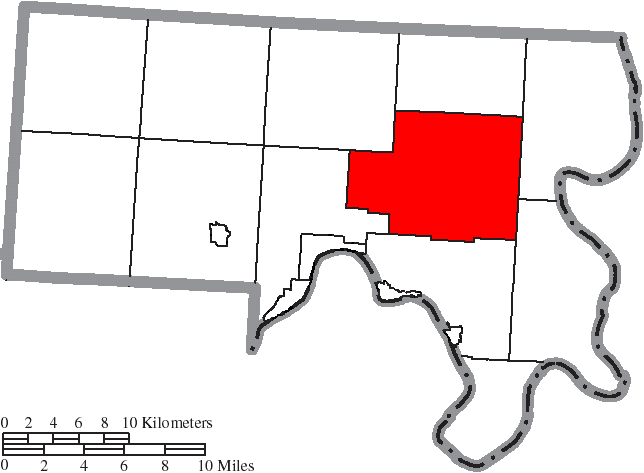
- Location of Chester Township in Meigs County
- Coordinates: 39°4′36″N 81°55′30″W
- Country: United States
- State: Ohio
- County: Meigs

Area
  - Total: 45.5 sq mi (117.9 km^{2})
  - Land: 45.5 sq mi (117.9 km^{2})
  - Water: 0 sq mi (0.0 km^{2})
- Elevation: 617 ft (188 m)

Population (2020)
  - Total: 2,497
  - Density: 54.85/sq mi (21.18/km^{2})
- Time zone: UTC-5 (Eastern (EST))
  - Summer (DST): UTC-4 (EDT)
- ZIP code: 45720
- Area code: 740
- FIPS code: 39-14016
- GNIS feature ID: 1086609
- Website: https://chestertownshipmeigs.com/

Chester Township is one of the twelve townships of Meigs County, Ohio, United States. The 2020 census found 2,497 people in the township.

== Geography ==
Located in the eastern part of the county, it borders the following townships:

- Orange Township - north
- Olive Township - northeast
- Lebanon Township - southeast
- Sutton Township - south
- Salisbury Township - west
- Bedford Township - northwest

It is the only county township without a border on another county.

No municipalities are located in Chester Township, although the unincorporated community of Chester is located in the township's center.

== Name and history ==
It is one of five Chester Townships statewide.

The Mound Cemetery Mound, an archaeological site, is located north of Chester; it is listed on the National Register of Historic Places.

== Government ==
The township is governed by a three-member board of trustees, who are elected in November of odd-numbered years to a four-year term beginning on the following January 1. Two are elected in the year after the presidential election and one is elected in the year before it. There is also an elected township fiscal officer, who serves a four-year term beginning on April 1 of the year after the election, which is held in November of the year before the presidential election. Vacancies in the fiscal officership or on the board of trustees are filled by the remaining trustees.
