= Salem Center, Ohio =

Unincorporated community in Ohio, U.S.

Coordinates: 39°03′10″N 82°16′26″W

Salem Center is an unincorporated community in Meigs County, in the U.S. state of Ohio.

== History ==
A post office called Salem Centre was established in 1856. Salem Center once had its own schoolhouse.
