= Silver Run, Ohio =

Unincorporated community in Ohio, U.S.

Coordinates: 38°58′35″N 82°05′28″W

Silver Run is an unincorporated community in Meigs County, in the U.S. state of Ohio.

== History ==
A post office called Silver Run was established in 1850. Silver Run is also the name of a nearby stream.
