= Reedsville, Ohio =

Unincorporated community in Ohio, U.S.

Coordinates: 39°07′17″N 81°44′51″W

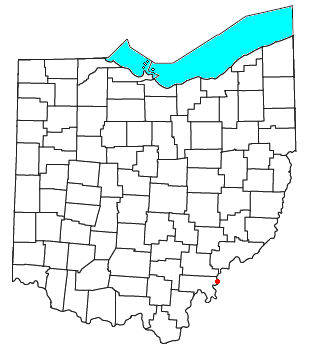
Location of Reedsville, Ohio

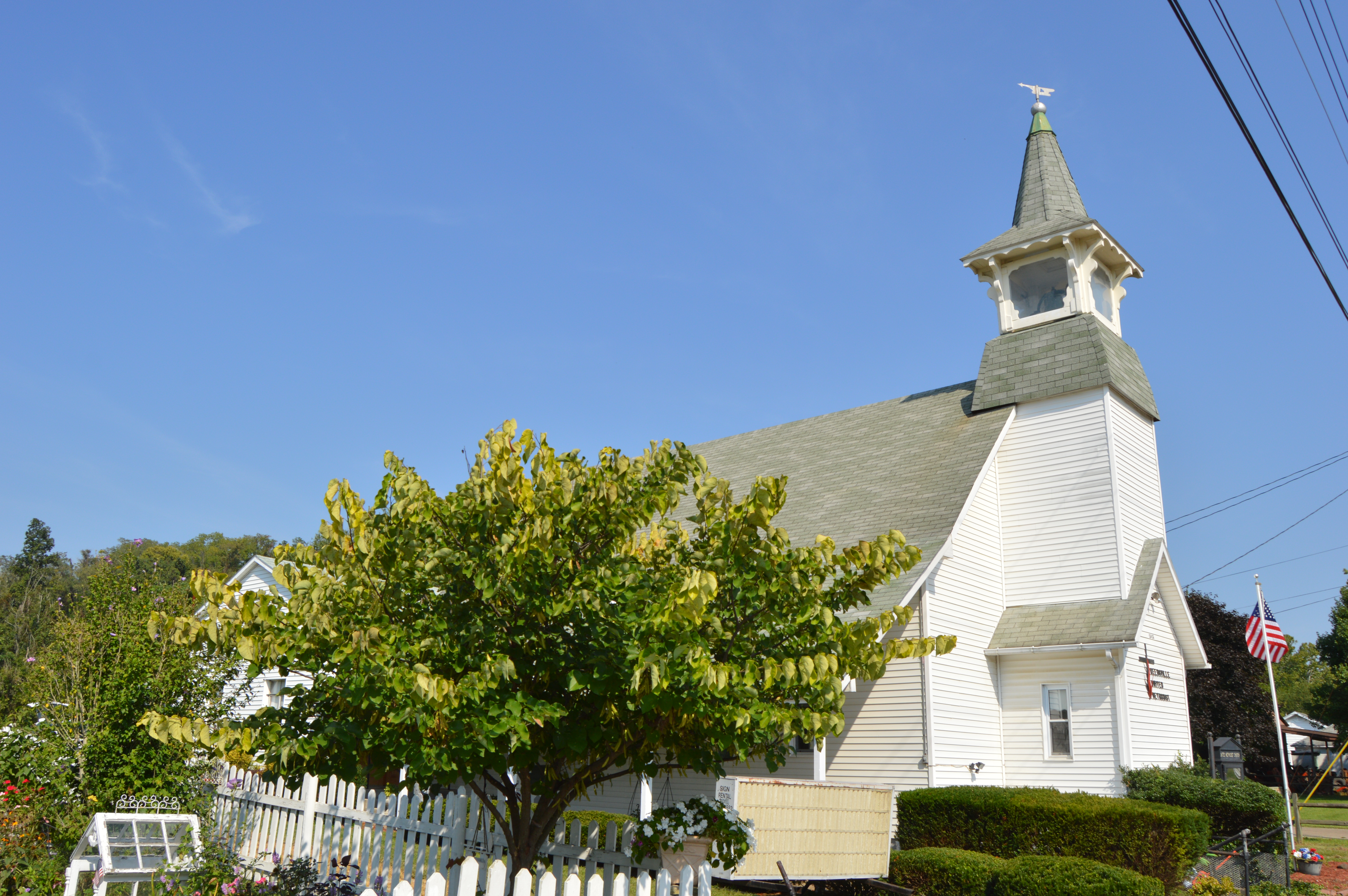
Reedsville United Methodist Church

Reedsville is an unincorporated community in eastern Olive Township, Meigs County, Ohio, United States. It has a post office with the ZIP code 45772.

It lies along the Ohio River, between Hockingport and Long Bottom.

== Education ==
Public education in the community of Reedsville is provided by the Eastern Local School District. Campuses serving the community include Eastern Elementary School (Grades K-8) and Eastern High School (Grades 9-12).

Reedsville has a public library, a branch of the Meigs County District Public Library.

== Notable people ==
- Herma Briffault (1898-1981), ghostwriter and translator
