= Silver Run (North Fork Hughes River tributary) =

River in the United States of America

Coordinates: 39°11′58″N 81°10′04″W

Silver Run is a stream in the U.S. state of West Virginia. It is a tributary of the North Fork Hughes River.

According to tradition, a silver object found during railroad construction accounts for the name.

== See also ==
- List of rivers of West Virginia
