= Eastern High School (Reedsville, Ohio) =

Location
- 38900 SR 7 Reedsville, Ohio 45772; United States; 39.121454°N 81.883446°W

Information
- Type: (Ohio) public, rural, high school
- School district: Eastern Local School District
- Superintendent: Nick Dettwiller
- NCES School ID: 390485103279
- Principal: Garret Hall
- Teaching staff: 21.00 (FTE)
- Grades: 9-12
- Enrollment: 328 (2023-2024)
- Student to teacher ratio: 15.62
- Colors: Green and white
- Athletics: baseball, boys' and girls' basketball, wrestling, boys' and girls' cross country, football, boys' and girls' golf, fast pitch softball, boys' and girls' track and field, and girls' volleyball
- Athletics conference: Tri-Valley Conference-Hocking Division
- Mascot: Eagles
- Website: District Website

Eastern High School (EHS) is a public high school in Reedsville, Ohio, United States. It is the only high school in the Eastern Local School District. Their nickname is the Eagles.

== Athletics ==
The Eagles belong to the Ohio High School Athletic Association (OHSAA) and the Tri-Valley Conference|, a 16-member athletic conference located in southeastern Ohio. The conference is divided into two divisions based on school size. The Ohio Division features the larger schools and the Hocking Division features the smaller schools, including Eastern.

== History ==
Eastern High School was formed through the consolidation of Olive-Orange High School in Tuppers Plains, Chester High School, and Riverview High School in Reedsville in 1958. Both the old high schools served as K-8th buildings in their respective communities until the construction of the new Eastern Elementary and Middle School was completed next door to the high school in 1999. The old Riverview School and its surrounding property were purchased by Shelly and Sands, Inc shortly thereafter and was demolished, much to the disapproval of community members in the Reedsville-Long Bottom area. The old Chester school serves as a community center. The Olive-Orange building is still operational in Tuppers Plains, housing both a preschool and the administrative offices of Eastern Local School District.

=== Ohio High School Athletic Association State Championships ===
- (State Champions) Girls' Basketball- 2014

== See also ==
- Ohio high school athletic conferences
