= Sutton Township, Meigs County, Ohio =

Township in Ohio, US

- Township
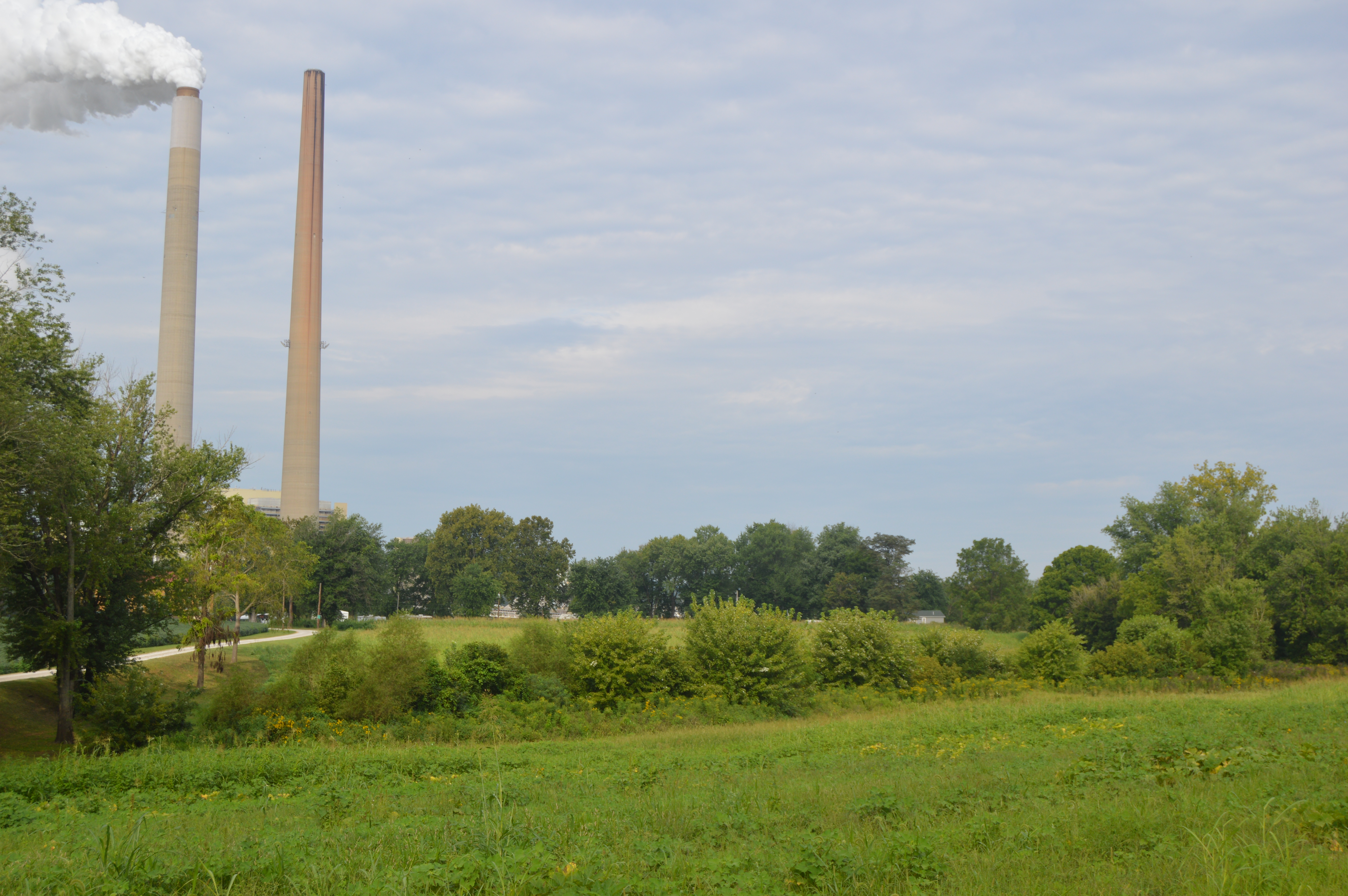
- Fields, with the Mountaineer Power Plant in the background

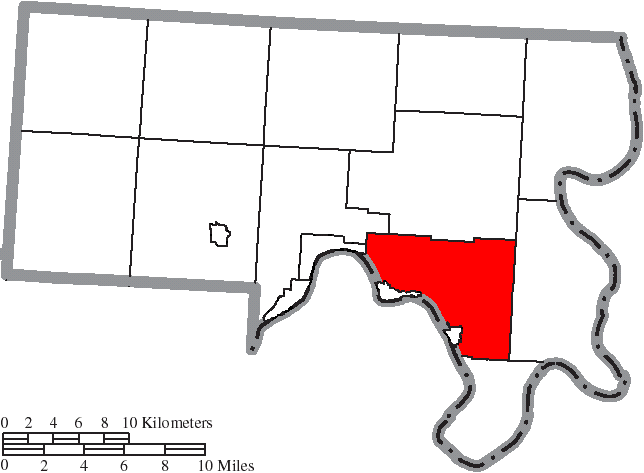
- Location of Sutton Township in Meigs County
- Coordinates: 38°59′47″N 81°55′50″W
- Country: United States
- State: Ohio
- County: Meigs

Area
  - Total: 31.5 sq mi (81.7 km^{2})
  - Land: 31.1 sq mi (80.6 km^{2})
  - Water: 0.42 sq mi (1.1 km^{2})
- Elevation: 574 ft (175 m)

Population (2020)
  - Total: 3,077
  - Density: 98.9/sq mi (38.2/km^{2})
- Time zone: UTC-5 (Eastern (EST))
  - Summer (DST): UTC-4 (EDT)
- FIPS code: 39-75847
- GNIS feature ID: 1086619

Sutton Township is one of the twelve townships of Meigs County, Ohio, United States. The 2020 census found 3,077 people in the township.

== Geography ==
Located in the southeastern part of the county along the Ohio River, it borders the following townships:

- Chester Township - north
- Lebanon Township - east
- Letart Township - southeast
- Salisbury Township - northwest

Mason County, West Virginia lies across the Ohio River to the southeast.

It is the second-farthest downstream of Meigs County's Ohio River townships.

Two villages are located along Sutton Township's shoreline: Racine, in the south, and Syracuse, in the southwest.

== Name and history ==
It is the only Sutton Township statewide.

== Government ==
The township is governed by a three-member board of trustees, who are elected in November of odd-numbered years to a four-year term beginning on the following January 1. Two are elected in the year after the presidential election and one is elected in the year before it. There is also an elected township fiscal officer, who serves a four-year term beginning on April 1 of the year after the election, which is held in November of the year before the presidential election. Vacancies in the fiscal officership or on the board of trustees are filled by the remaining trustees.
