= Meigs County, Ohio =

County in Ohio, United States

- County
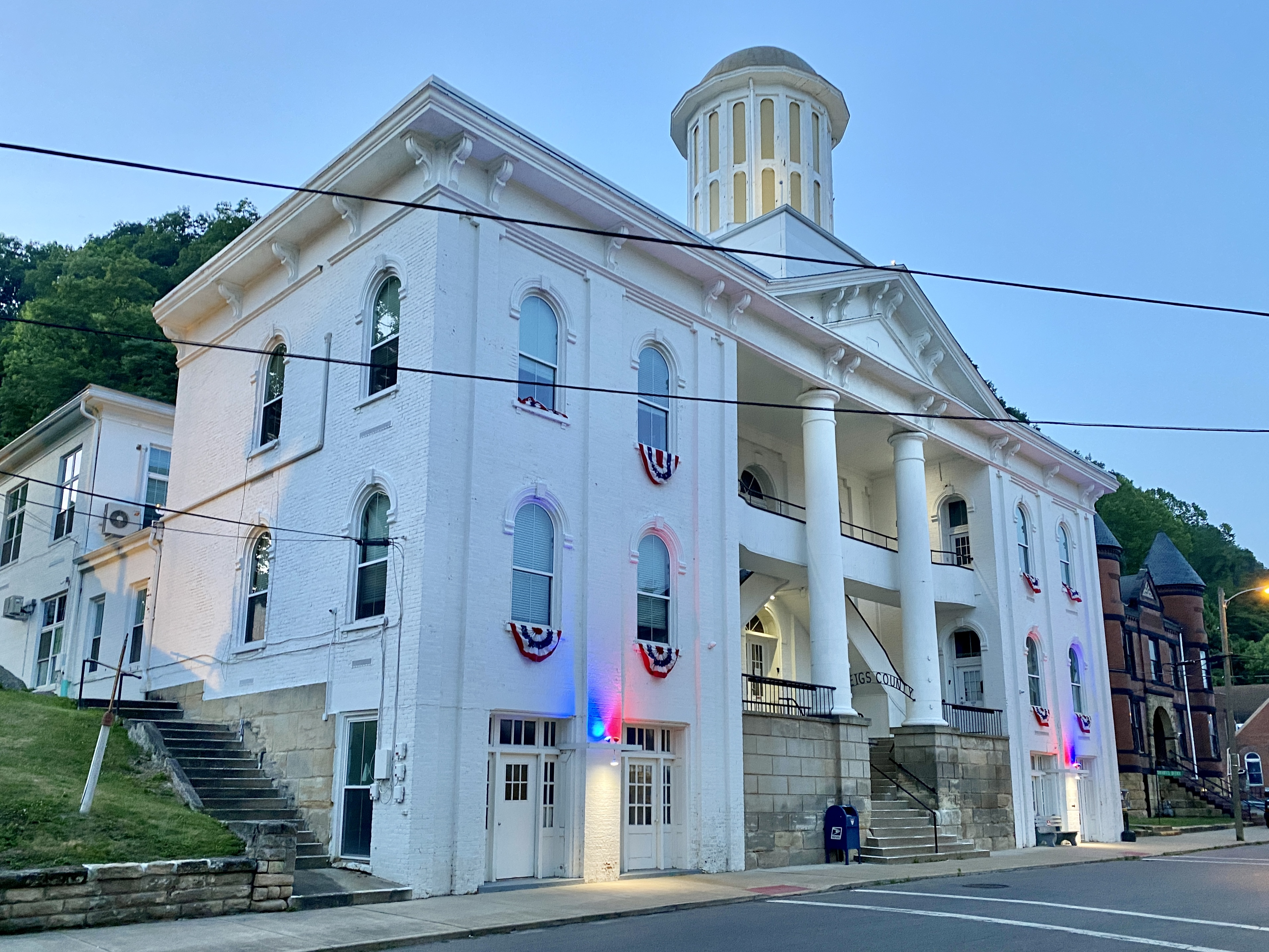
- County courthouse in Pomeroy

- Flag Seal

- Location within the U.S. state of Ohio
- Coordinates: 39°05′N 82°01′W
- Country: United States
- State: Ohio
- Founded: April 1, 1819
- Named for: Return J. Meigs Jr.
- Seat: Pomeroy
- Largest village: Middleport

Area
  - Total: 433 sq mi (1,120 km^{2})
  - Land: 430 sq mi (1,100 km^{2})
  - Water: 2.9 sq mi (7.5 km^{2}) 0.7%

Population (2020)
  - Total: 22,210
  - Estimate (2025): 21,587 ▼
  - Density: 51/sq mi (20/km^{2})
- Time zone: UTC−5 (Eastern)
  - Summer (DST): UTC−4 (EDT)
- Congressional district: 2nd
- Website: www.meigscountyohio.com

Meigs County (/ˈmɛɡz/ MEGZ) is a county located in the U.S. state of Ohio. As of the 2020 census, the population was 22,210. Its county seat is Pomeroy. Meigs County, Ohio was officially established on April 1, 1819 (after authorization by the state government on January 21, 1819) from parts of Gallia and Athens counties. The county is named for Return J. Meigs Jr., the fourth governor of Ohio.

== Geography ==
According to the U.S. Census Bureau, the county has a total area of 433 square miles (1,120 km^{2}), of which 430 square miles (1,100 km^{2}) is land and 2.9 square miles (7.5 km^{2}) (0.7%) is water. The Ohio River forms the eastern and southern boundaries of the county, the other side of which is located in West Virginia.

Meigs County lies in the Appalachian Plateau physiographic region of the Appalachian Mountains. The landscape ranges from gently rolling to rugged, typical of a dissected plateau. Elevations range from 1,020 feet (310 m) above sea level (asl) in the southwest to about 535 feet (163 m) asl in the far south central part of the county along the Ohio River. The majority of Meigs County is drained by two subwatersheds of the Ohio River, Shade River and Leading Creek. Another stream of note is Raccoon Creek, which flows through a small area of the northwestern corner of the county.

Coal mining, both strip and underground, has been an important industry in Meigs County since the late 19th century, although mining of all types largely ceased by the 1990s. The effects of mining are still readily seen on the landscape today. Features such as high walls, spoil piles, and irregular topography are still prevalent.

Historically, many tributaries in the Leading Creek basin have been plagued by acid mine drainage, sedimentation, and nutrient enrichment/pathogens via runoff from sewage treatment systems and agricultural practices. In 1993, an emergency dewatering event at the Meigs #31 Mine (owned by Southern Ohio Coal Company) released millions of gallons of partially treated and untreated mine water into the Leading Creek Watershed. This unregulated discharge eliminated all life from Parker Run and the lower 16 miles of Leading Creek. In response to this environmental disaster, the United States Fish and Wildlife Service established a restoration plan for the watershed.

In 2009, Gatling, Ohio LLC invested $75 million to open the Yellowbush coal mine and coal prep plant near Racine, Ohio. It was deemed capable of employing 120 to 150 miners and had an estimated production capacity of 3.5 million marketable tons of coal per year. In 2015, the Yellowbush mine closed after years of slow development and lower production levels than expected.

=== Climate ===
Meigs County's climate is considered humid continental, with warm to hot, humid summers and cool to cold, wet winters. Precipitation averages 41" annually, spread evenly throughout the year. High July temperatures average in the upper 80s F, while lows average in the low to mid 60s F. Temperatures above 90* F in the summer are common. January highs average about 40* F, with lows in the lower 20s. Temperatures around or even below 0* F occur during most winters. Snowfall averages 20–25", falling between late November and the first week of April.

The Ohio River creates a microclimate in its valley where temperatures tend to be moderated by the river, hence resulting in longer growing seasons compared to the rest of the county. Other microclimates, known as frost hollows or frost pockets, exist throughout the county in small isolated valleys. Nocturnal temperatures are often several degrees colder than the surrounding terrain.

=== Adjacent counties ===
- Athens County (north)
- Wood County, West Virginia (northeast)
- Jackson County, West Virginia (east)
- Mason County, West Virginia (southeast)
- Gallia County (southwest)
- Vinton County (west)

=== State protected areas ===
- Forked Run State Park
- Shade River State Forest

== Demographics ==
Historical population
Census	Pop.	Note	%±
1820	4,480		—
1830	6,158		37.5%
1840	11,452		86.0%
1850	17,971		56.9%
1860	26,534		47.6%
1870	31,465		18.6%
1880	32,325		2.7%
1890	29,813		−7.8%
1900	28,620		−4.0%
1910	25,594		−10.6%
1920	26,189		2.3%
1930	23,961		−8.5%
1940	24,104		0.6%
1950	23,227		−3.6%
1960	22,159		−4.6%
1970	19,799		−10.7%
1980	23,641		19.4%
1990	22,987		−2.8%
2000	23,072		0.4%
2010	23,770		3.0%
2020	22,210		−6.6%
2025 (est.)	21,587	▼	−2.8%
U.S. Decennial Census; 1790–1960 1900–1990; 1990–2000 2020

=== 2020 census ===
As of the 2020 census, the county had a population of 22,210. The median age was 44.6 years. 21.2% of residents were under the age of 18 and 21.3% of residents were 65 years of age or older. For every 100 females there were 99.3 males, and for every 100 females age 18 and over there were 97.3 males age 18 and over.

The racial makeup of the county was 95.7% White, 0.7% Black or African American, 0.2% American Indian and Alaska Native, 0.1% Asian, <0.1% Native Hawaiian and Pacific Islander, 0.4% from some other race, and 2.9% from two or more races. Hispanic or Latino residents of any race comprised 0.8% of the population.

12.0% of residents lived in urban areas, while 88.0% lived in rural areas.

There were 9,204 households in the county, of which 28.0% had children under the age of 18 living in them. Of all households, 48.1% were married-couple households, 19.9% were households with a male householder and no spouse or partner present, and 24.4% were households with a female householder and no spouse or partner present. About 28.8% of all households were made up of individuals and 13.7% had someone living alone who was 65 years of age or older.

There were 10,649 housing units, of which 13.6% were vacant. Among occupied housing units, 77.4% were owner-occupied and 22.6% were renter-occupied. The homeowner vacancy rate was 1.7% and the rental vacancy rate was 7.8%.

=== Racial and ethnic composition ===
Meigs County, Ohio – Racial and ethnic composition Note: the US Census treats Hispanic/Latino as an ethnic category. This table excludes Latinos from the racial categories and assigns them to a separate category. Hispanics/Latinos may be of any race.
Race / ethnicity (NH = Non-Hispanic)	Pop 1980	Pop 1990	Pop 2000	Pop 2010	Pop 2020	% 1980	% 1990	% 2000	% 2010	% 2020
White alone (NH)	23,230	22,690	22,461	23,087	21,180	98.26%	98.71%	97.35%	97.13%	95.36%
Black or African American alone (NH)	206	177	159	202	148	0.87%	0.77%	0.69%	0.85%	0.67%
Native American or Alaska Native alone (NH)	27	41	58	50	49	0.11%	0.18%	0.25%	0.21%	0.22%
Asian alone (NH)	30	19	24	51	22	0.13%	0.08%	0.10%	0.21%	0.10%
Native Hawaiian or Pacific Islander alone (NH)	x	x	0	1	0	x	x	0.00%	0.00%	0.00%
Other race alone (NH)	10	1	15	10	43	0.04%	0.00%	0.07%	0.04%	0.19%
Mixed race or Multiracial (NH)	x	x	217	254	596	x	x	0.94%	1.07%	2.68%
Hispanic or Latino (any race)	138	59	138	115	172	0.58%	0.26%	0.60%	0.48%	0.77%
Total	23,641	22,987	23,072	23,770	22,210	100.00%	100.00%	100.00%	100.00%	100.00%

=== 2010 census ===
As of the 2010 United States census, there were 23,770 people, 9,557 households, and 6,698 families living in the county. The population density was 55.3 inhabitants per square mile (21.4/km^{2}). There were 11,191 housing units at an average density of 26.0 units per square mile (10.0 units/km^{2}). The racial makeup of the county was 97.4% white, 0.9% black or African American, 0.2% Asian, 0.2% American Indian, 0.1% from other races, and 1.2% from two or more races. Those of Hispanic or Latino origin made up 0.5% of the population. In terms of ancestry, 25.1% were German, 14.3% were Irish, 13.9% were American, and 9.6% were English.

Of the 9,557 households, 31.4% had children under the age of 18 living with them, 52.6% were married couples living together, 11.5% had a female householder with no husband present, 29.9% were non-families, and 25.3% of all households were made up of individuals. The average household size was 2.46 and the average family size was 2.91. The median age was 41.2 years.

The median income for a household in the county was $33,407 and the median income for a family was $42,653. Males had a median income of $41,850 versus $27,271 for females. The per capita income for the county was $18,003. About 16.7% of families and 20.8% of the population were below the poverty line, including 31.9% of those under age 18 and 12.3% of those age 65 or over.

=== 2000 census ===
As of the census of 2000, there were 23,072 people, 9,234 households, and 6,574 families living in the county. The population density was 54 people per square mile (21 people/km^{2}). There were 10,782 housing units at an average density of 25 units per square mile (9.7/km^{2}). The racial makeup of the county was 97.73% White, 0.69% Black or African American, 0.27% Native American, 0.10% Asian, 0.25% from other races, and 0.96% from two or more races. 0.60% of the population were Hispanic or Latino of any race.

There were 9,234 households, out of which 31.20% had children under the age of 18 living with them, 56.90% were married couples living together, 10.00% had a female householder with no husband present, and 28.80% were non-families. 25.00% of all households were made up of individuals, and 11.70% had someone living alone who was 65 years of age or older. The average household size was 2.47 and the average family size was 2.94.

In the county, the population was spread out, with 23.90% under the age of 18, 8.40% from 18 to 24, 27.70% from 25 to 44, 25.20% from 45 to 64, and 14.80% who were 65 years of age or older. The median age was 39 years. For every 100 females there were 94.70 males. For every 100 females age 18 and over, there were 92.80 males.

The median income for a household in the county was $27,287, and the median income for a family was $33,071. Males had a median income of $30,821 versus $19,621 for females. The per capita income for the county was $13,848. About 14.30% of families and 19.80% of the population were below the poverty line, including 26.30% of those under age 18 and 14.50% of those age 65 or over.

== Politics ==
Owing to its history as a settlement of the Yankee Ohio Company of Associates, Meigs County was reliably Republican for the first century following that party's formation. Meigs County voted Republican in every Presidential election between 1856 and 1960. It was won four times by Democrats between 1964 and 1996 (although Bill Clinton who carried Meigs twice did so only with pluralities) but has become powerfully Republican again since 2000. Barack Obama reached 39% in this county despite his statewide victories in 2008 or 2012, but Donald Trump reached a record 72.8% in the county in 2016 owing to his strength in rural counties nationwide.

United States presidential election results for Meigs County, Ohio
Year	Republican		Democratic		Third party(ies)	
Year	No.	%	No.	%	No.	%
1856	1,998	50.65%	1,603	40.63%	344	8.72%
1860	2,689	58.30%	1,699	36.84%	224	4.86%
1864	3,522	70.68%	1,461	29.32%	0	0.00%
1868	3,548	63.64%	2,027	36.36%	0	0.00%
1872	3,501	65.81%	1,812	34.06%	7	0.13%
1876	3,962	58.68%	2,773	41.07%	17	0.25%
1880	4,103	59.51%	2,749	39.87%	43	0.62%
1884	4,177	60.39%	2,630	38.02%	110	1.59%
1888	3,989	60.41%	2,413	36.54%	201	3.04%
1892	3,959	59.37%	2,415	36.22%	294	4.41%
1896	4,696	64.27%	2,536	34.71%	75	1.03%
1900	4,545	65.59%	2,237	32.28%	147	2.12%
1904	4,304	68.45%	1,708	27.16%	276	4.39%
1908	4,108	62.05%	2,225	33.61%	288	4.35%
1912	2,129	36.39%	1,738	29.71%	1,983	33.90%
1916	3,184	52.79%	2,628	43.57%	219	3.63%
1920	6,541	63.36%	3,606	34.93%	177	1.71%
1924	4,864	57.28%	1,944	22.89%	1,684	19.83%
1928	6,580	70.65%	2,661	28.57%	73	0.78%
1932	5,964	53.04%	5,105	45.40%	175	1.56%
1936	6,464	51.51%	6,085	48.49%	0	0.00%
1940	7,239	59.23%	4,983	40.77%	0	0.00%
1944	6,401	65.32%	3,399	34.68%	0	0.00%
1948	5,564	60.52%	3,595	39.11%	34	0.37%
1952	6,700	66.76%	3,336	33.24%	0	0.00%
1956	6,593	70.32%	2,783	29.68%	0	0.00%
1960	6,976	66.77%	3,472	33.23%	0	0.00%
1964	3,973	43.63%	5,133	56.37%	0	0.00%
1968	4,759	56.29%	2,921	34.55%	775	9.17%
1972	5,961	70.69%	2,335	27.69%	137	1.62%
1976	4,942	47.76%	5,262	50.85%	144	1.39%
1980	4,911	53.56%	3,827	41.73%	432	4.71%
1984	6,307	63.52%	3,549	35.74%	73	0.74%
1988	5,486	59.14%	3,699	39.88%	91	0.98%
1992	3,916	38.07%	4,226	41.08%	2,144	20.84%
1996	3,622	38.27%	4,275	45.17%	1,568	16.57%
2000	5,750	58.70%	3,674	37.51%	371	3.79%
2004	6,272	58.23%	4,438	41.20%	61	0.57%
2008	6,015	57.80%	4,094	39.34%	298	2.86%
2012	5,895	57.69%	4,027	39.41%	296	2.90%
2016	7,309	72.79%	2,260	22.51%	472	4.70%
2020	8,316	75.83%	2,492	22.72%	159	1.45%
2024	8,127	77.98%	2,202	21.13%	93	0.89%

United States Senate election results for Meigs County, Ohio1
Year	Republican		Democratic		Third party(ies)	
Year	No.	%	No.	%	No.	%
2024	7,385	72.30%	2,456	24.04%	374	3.66%

== Education ==
- Meigs Local School District
- Eastern Local School District
- Southern Local School District

== Communities ==
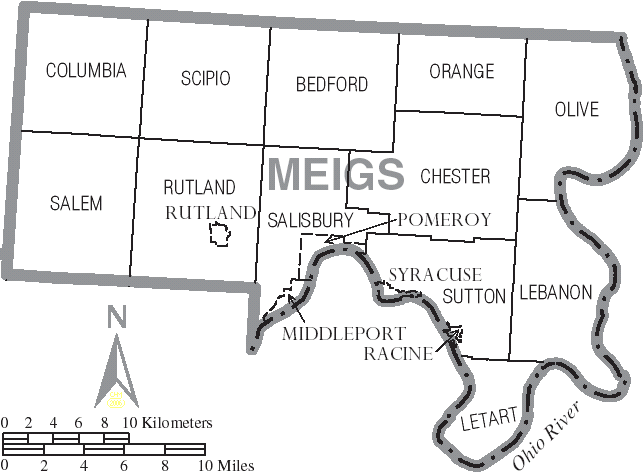
Map of Meigs County, Ohio with municipal and township labels

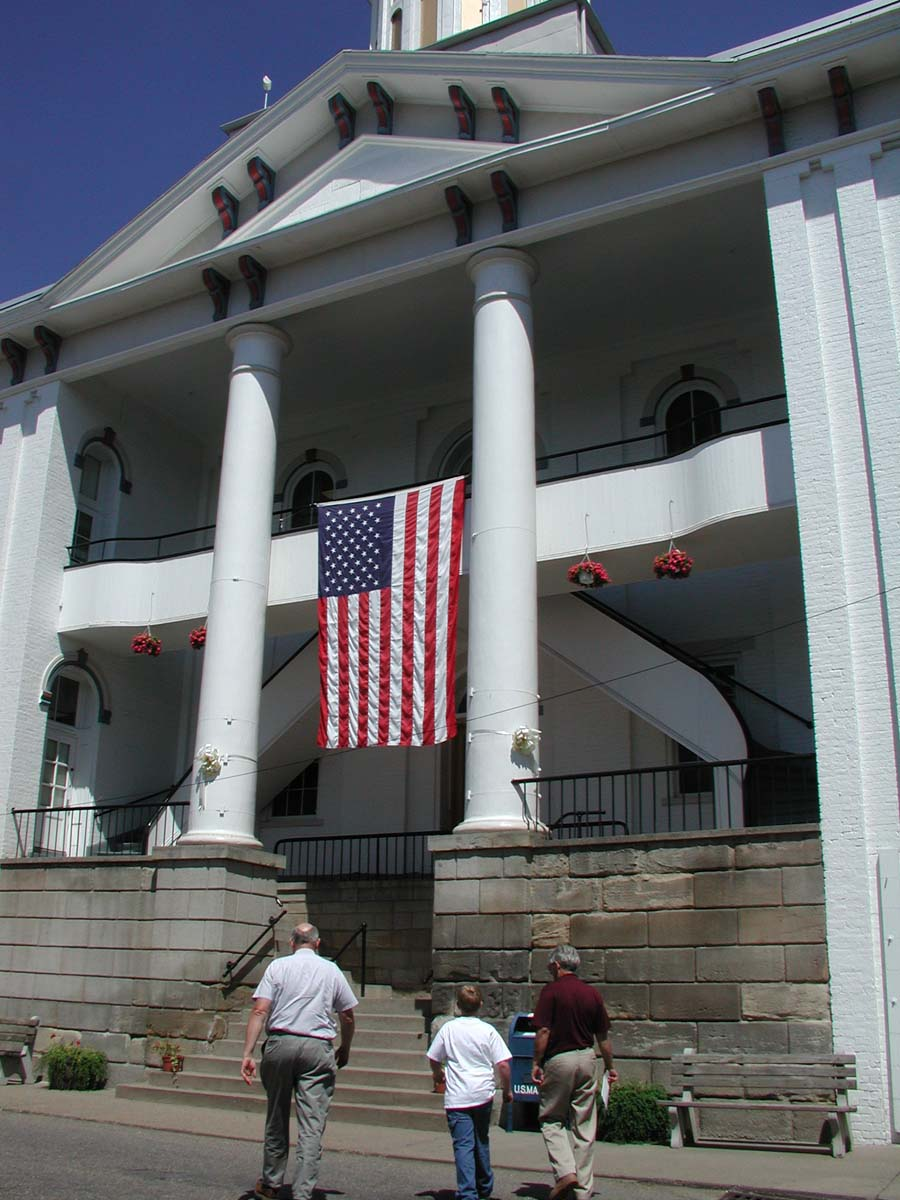
Meigs County Courthouse

=== Villages ===
- Middleport
- Pomeroy (county seat)
- Racine
- Rutland
- Syracuse

=== Townships ===
- Bedford
- Chester
- Columbia
- Lebanon
- Letart
- Olive
- Orange
- Rutland
- Salem
- Salisbury
- Scipio
- Sutton

=== Census-designated place ===
- Tuppers Plains

=== Unincorporated communities ===
- Alfred
- Antiquity
- Apple Grove
- Carletonville
- Carpenter
- Chester
- Darwin
- Harrisonville
- Kingsbury
- Langsville
- Letart Falls
- Long Bottom
- Meigs
- Minersville
- Portland
- Reedsville
- Salem Center
- Silver Run
- Spiller
- Success
- Welsh

== Notable natives and residents ==
- Nelson Story Sr. was born in Burlingham, Meigs County, Ohio in 1838.
- Mike Bartrum, an NFL long snapper/tight end
- Ambrose Bierce, a journalist and short story writer, best known for "An Occurrence at Owl Creek Bridge".
- James Edwin Campbell, a poet, writer and educator
- David L. "Dave" Diles, a former American sports broadcaster and journalist
- Norman "Kid" Elberfeld, a Major League Baseball shortstop and manager
- William P. Halliday, steamboat captain, businessman, and railroad executive.
- Ralston B. (Rollie) Hemsley, Major League Baseball catcher
- Samuel Dana Horton, a bimetallism writer
- Reverend Fr. John Joseph Jessing, founder of the Pontifical College Josephinum in Columbus, Ohio
- Benny Kauff, Major League Baseball player
- Cy Morgan, a Major League Baseball pitcher

== See also ==
- National Register of Historic Places listings in Meigs County, Ohio
