= Letart Township, Meigs County, Ohio =

Township in Ohio, US

- Township
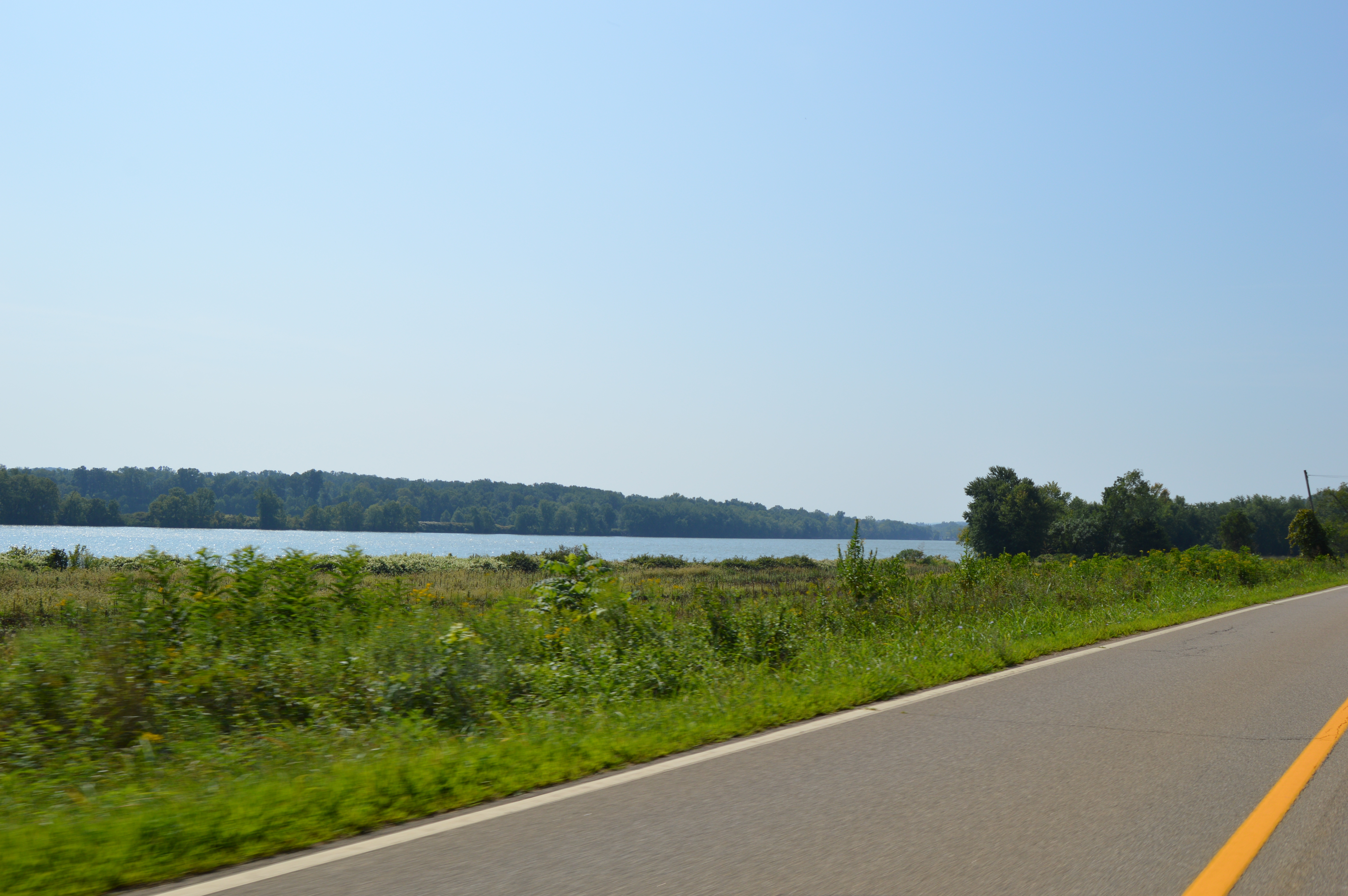
- Along the River north of Apple Grove

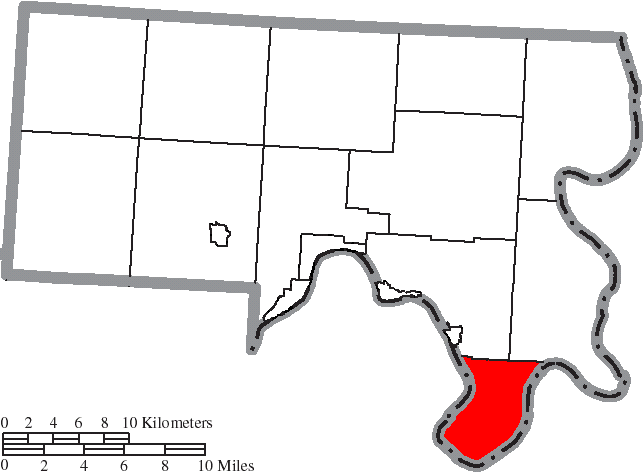
- Location of Letart Township in Meigs County
- Coordinates: 38°54′47″N 81°52′25″W
- Country: United States
- State: Ohio
- County: Meigs

Area
  - Total: 17.5 sq mi (45.2 km^{2})
  - Land: 16.6 sq mi (43.0 km^{2})
  - Water: 0.85 sq mi (2.2 km^{2})
- Elevation: 804 ft (245 m)

Population (2020)
  - Total: 733
  - Density: 44.2/sq mi (17.0/km^{2})
- Time zone: UTC-5 (Eastern (EST))
  - Summer (DST): UTC-4 (EDT)
- FIPS code: 39-42868
- GNIS feature ID: 1086612

Letart Township is one of the twelve townships of Meigs County, Ohio, United States. The 2020 census found 733 people in the township.

== Geography ==
Located in the southeastern part of the county along the Ohio River, it borders the following townships:

- Sutton Township - northwest
- Lebanon Township - northeast

Letart Township is composed of a peninsula jutting southward into the Ohio River. West Virginia lies across the river: Jackson County to the east, and Mason County to the west.

It is located in the middle of Meigs County's Ohio River townships.

No municipalities are located in Letart Township.

== Name and history ==
The township name comes from Letart Falls on the Ohio River, named for a Frenchman James Le Tort who reportedly drowned in the falls. It is the only Letart Township statewide. David Sayre (1736-1826) and his family were said to have been the first settlers in what is now Letart Township, arriving in 1803 from New Jersey by way of western Virginia.

== Government ==
The township is governed by a three-member board of trustees, who are elected in November of odd-numbered years to a four-year term beginning on the following January 1. Two are elected in the year after the presidential election and one is elected in the year before it. There is also an elected township fiscal officer, who serves a four-year term beginning on April 1 of the year after the election, which is held in November of the year before the presidential election. Vacancies in the fiscal officership or on the board of trustees are filled by the remaining trustees.
