= Lebanon Township, Meigs County, Ohio =

Township in Ohio, US

- Township
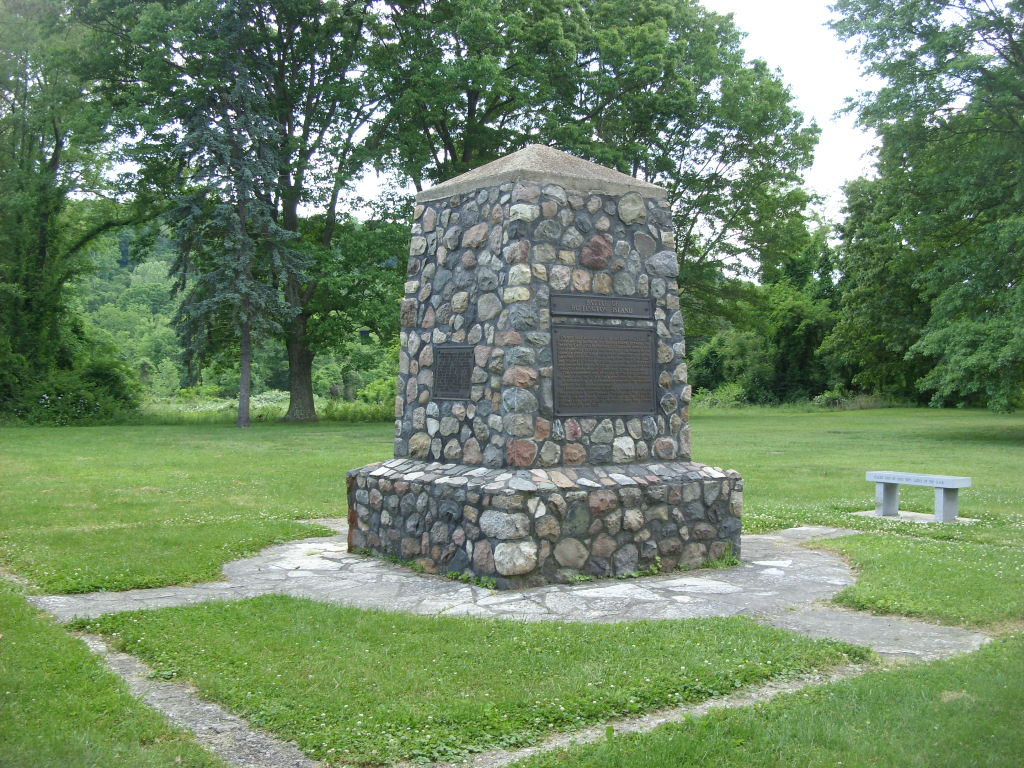
- Marker at the site of the Battle of Buffington Island

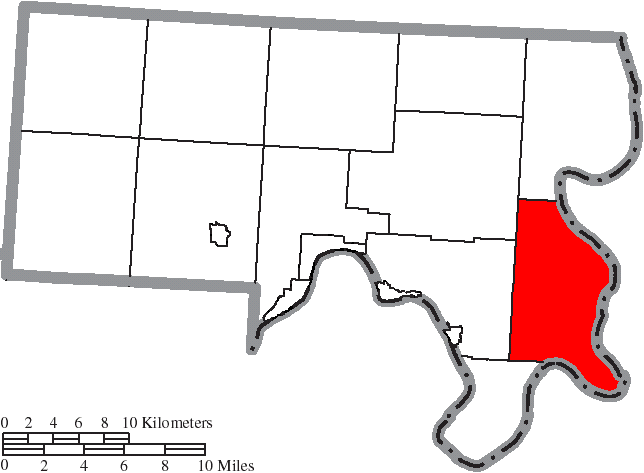
- Location of Lebanon Township in Meigs County
- Coordinates: 39°0′35″N 81°48′27″W
- Country: United States
- State: Ohio
- County: Meigs

Area
  - Total: 36.5 sq mi (94.5 km^{2})
  - Land: 35.8 sq mi (92.6 km^{2})
  - Water: 0.69 sq mi (1.8 km^{2})
- Elevation: 814 ft (248 m)

Population (2020)
  - Total: 897
  - Density: 25.1/sq mi (9.69/km^{2})
- Time zone: UTC-5 (Eastern (EST))
  - Summer (DST): UTC-4 (EDT)
- FIPS code: 39-42336
- GNIS feature ID: 1086611

Lebanon Township is one of the twelve townships of Meigs County, Ohio, United States. The 2020 census found 897 people in the township.

== Geography ==
Located in the eastern part of the county along the Ohio River, it borders the following townships:

- Olive Township - north
- Letart Township - southwest
- Sutton Township - west
- Chester Township - northwest

Jackson County, West Virginia lies across the Ohio River to the east.

It is the second-farthest upstream of Meigs County's Ohio River townships.

No municipalities are located in Lebanon Township, although the unincorporated community of Portland is located on the township's eastern shoreline.

== Name and history ==
It is the only Lebanon Township statewide.

== Government ==
The township is governed by a three-member board of trustees, who are elected in November of odd-numbered years to a four-year term beginning on the following January 1. Two are elected in the year after the presidential election and one is elected in the year before it. There is also an elected township fiscal officer, who serves a four-year term beginning on April 1 of the year after the election, which is held in November of the year before the presidential election. Vacancies in the fiscal officership or on the board of trustees are filled by the remaining trustees.
