= Racine, Ohio =

- Village
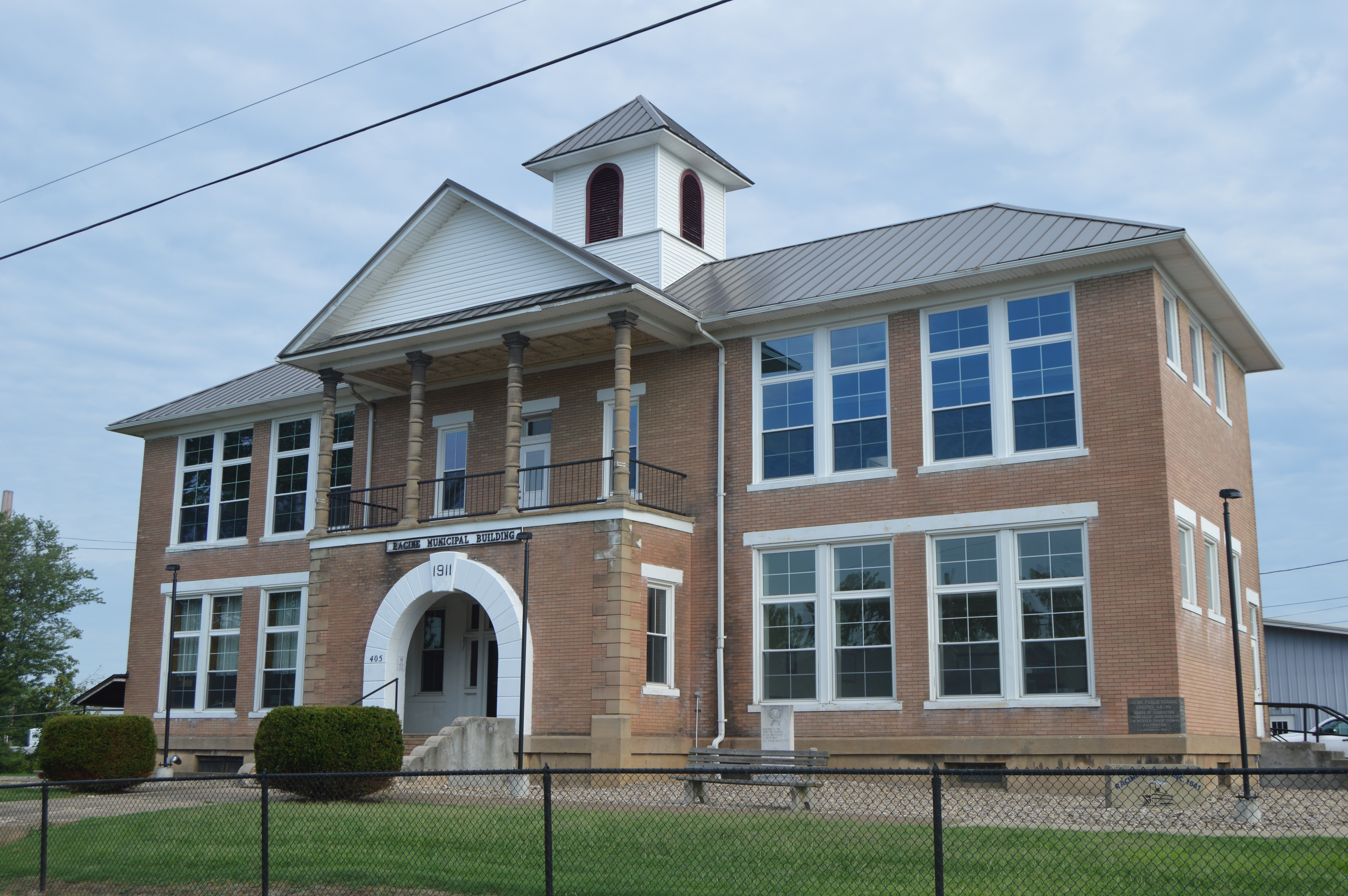
- Village hall, formerly a school

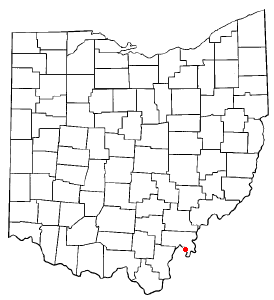
- Location of Racine, Ohio

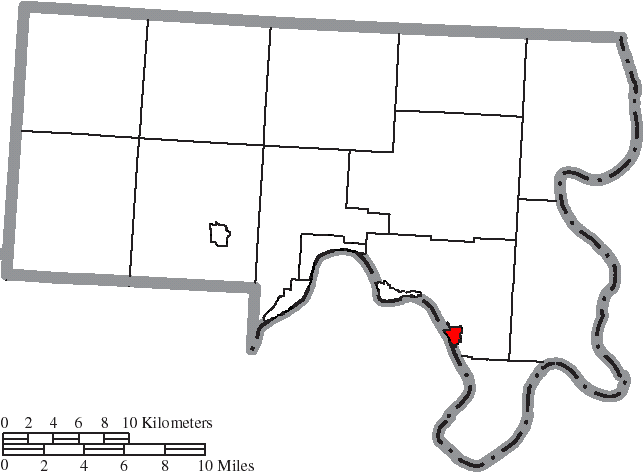
- Location of Racine in Meigs County
- Coordinates: 38°58′06″N 81°54′38″W
- Country: United States
- State: Ohio
- County: Meigs
- Township: Sutton

Area
  - Total: 0.56 sq mi (1.45 km^{2})
  - Land: 0.56 sq mi (1.45 km^{2})
  - Water: 0 sq mi (0.00 km^{2})
- Elevation: 604 ft (184 m)

Population (2020)
  - Total: 683
  - Density: 1,216.6/sq mi (469.72/km^{2})
- Time zone: UTC-5 (Eastern (EST))
  - Summer (DST): UTC-4 (EDT)
- ZIP code: 45771
- Area code: 740
- FIPS code: 39-65256
- GNIS feature ID: 2399034
- Website: https://www.racineohio.com/

Racine is a village in Meigs County, Ohio, United States, along the Ohio River. The population was 683 at the 2020 census.

== Geography ==
According to the United States Census Bureau, the village has a total area of 0.44 square miles (1.14 km^{2}), all land.

== Demographics ==
Historical population
| Census | Pop. | Note | %± |
|---|---|---|---|
| 1870 | 560 | | — |
| 1880 | 453 | | −19.1% |
| 1900 | 327 | | — |
| 1910 | 540 | | 65.1% |
| 1920 | 472 | | −12.6% |
| 1930 | 513 | | 8.7% |
| 1940 | 490 | | −4.5% |
| 1950 | 536 | | 9.4% |
| 1960 | 499 | | −6.9% |
| 1970 | 583 | | 16.8% |
| 1980 | 908 | | 55.7% |
| 1990 | 729 | | −19.7% |
| 2000 | 746 | | 2.3% |
| 2010 | 675 | | −9.5% |
| 2020 | 683 | | 1.2% |
U.S. Decennial Census

=== 2010 census ===
As of the census of 2010, there were 675 people, 288 households, and 191 families living in the village. The population density was 1,534.1 inhabitants per square mile (592.3/km^{2}). There were 333 housing units at an average density of 756.8 per square mile (292.2/km^{2}). The racial makeup of the village was 98.1% White, 0.3% African American, 0.1% from other races, and 1.5% from two or more races. Hispanic or Latino of any race were 0.3% of the population.

There were 288 households, of which 30.9% had children under the age of 18 living with them, 43.1% were married couples living together, 16.3% had a female householder with no husband present, 6.9% had a male householder with no wife present, and 33.7% were non-families. 29.5% of all households were made up of individuals, and 14.9% had someone living alone who was 65 years of age or older. The average household size was 2.34 and the average family size was 2.83.

The median age in the village was 40.1 years. 21.6% of residents were under the age of 18; 8.9% were between the ages of 18 and 24; 24.8% were from 25 to 44; 26.2% were from 45 to 64; and 18.7% were 65 years of age or older. The gender makeup of the village was 46.7% male and 53.3% female.

=== 2000 census ===
As of the census of 2000, there were 746 people, 302 households, and 211 families living in the village. The population density was 1,792.9 inhabitants per square mile (692.2/km^{2}). There were 324 housing units at an average density of 778.7 per square mile (300.7/km^{2}). The racial makeup of the village was 99.46% White, 0.13% African American, 0.13% Native American, 0.13% Asian, and 0.13% from two or more races. Hispanic or Latino of any race were 0.13% of the population.

There were 302 households, out of which 28.1% had children under the age of 18 living with them, 57.6% were married couples living together, 11.6% had a female householder with no husband present, and 30.1% were non-families. 27.2% of all households were made up of individuals, and 11.9% had someone living alone who was 65 years of age or older. The average household size was 2.47 and the average family size was 3.01.

In the village, the population was spread out, with 24.5% under the age of 18, 9.4% from 18 to 24, 25.3% from 25 to 44, 24.0% from 45 to 64, and 16.8% who were 65 years of age or older. The median age was 38 years. For every 100 females, there were 87.4 males. For every 100 females age 18 and over, there were 85.2 males.

The median income for a household in the village was $22,450, and the median income for a family was $30,000. Males had a median income of $26,071 versus $18,125 for females. The per capita income for the village was $13,644. About 23.2% of families and 26.4% of the population were below the poverty line, including 35.9% of those under age 18 and 12.6% of those age 65 or over.

== Education ==
Public education in the village of Racine is provided by the Southern Local School District. Campuses serving the village include Southern Elementary School (Grades K-8) and Southern High School (Grades 9-12).

Racine has a public library, a branch of the Meigs County District Public Library.

== See also ==
- List of cities and towns along the Ohio River
