= Ohio State Route 124 =

State highway in southern Ohio, US

State Route 124

Route information
- Maintained by ODOT
- Length: 165.51 mi (266.36 km)
- Existed: 1926–present

Major junctions
- West end: SR 134 near Martinsville
- SR 73 / US 62 / US 50 in Hillsboro; SR 32 from Piketon to Wellston; US 23 in Piketon; US 35 in Jackson; US 33 / SR 833 / SR 7 in Pomeroy; SR 144 in Hockingport
- East end: US 50 / SR 7 / SR 32 near Torch

Location
- Country: United States
- State: Ohio
- Counties: Clinton, Highland, Pike, Jackson, Vinton, Meigs, Athens

Highway system
- Ohio State Highway System; Interstate; US; State; Scenic
← SR 123	→ SR 125
← US 24	→ US 25

State Route 124 (SR 124) is an east–west state highway in the southern portion of the U.S. state of Ohio. Its western terminus is at State Route 134 nearly 4 miles (6.4 km) southeast of Martinsville, and its eastern terminus is near the unincorporated village of Torch at the concurrency of U.S. Route 50, State Route 7, and State Route 32 in extreme southeastern Athens County. The road passes through numerous villages along its route, many of them economically depressed. State Route 124 has the longest concurrency of state routes in Ohio, running concurrent with State Route 32 for 35½ miles. The road was recently rerouted in 2003 following the extension of U.S. Route 33 to the Ravenswood Bridge.

== History ==
- 1926 – Original route certified; originally routed from Hillsboro to 3 miles (4.8 km) south of Portland along the former State Route 24 alignment.
- 1934 – Extended to Portland.
- 1935 – Extended to 1-mile (1.6 km) east of Coolville along a previously unnumbered road from Portland to Long Bottom, a former alignment of State Route 248 from Long Bottom to Reedsville, a previously unnumbered road from Reedsville to Hockingport, and along the current State Route 144 from Hockingport to 1-mile (1.6 km) east of Coolville.
- 1936 – Rerouted to its current eastern terminus along a previously unnumbered road (this alignment was State Route 144 before 1926); Hockingport to 1-mile (1.6 km) east of Coolville certified as State Route 144.
- 1938 – Extended to its current western terminus along a previously unnumbered road; rerouted from Great Bend to 3 miles (4.8 km) south of Portland along the current State Route 338; former alignment from Great Bend to 3 miles (4.8 km) south of Portland certified as State Route 338.
- 1941 – State Route 124 and State Route 338 alignments from Great Bend to 3 miles (4.8 km) south of Portland reverted to previous and current routings.
- 1934 – Extended to Portland.
- 1969 – Joined with State Route 7 along Pomeroy bypass.
- 1974 – 4 miles (6.4 km) west of Jasper to Jasper upgraded to divided highway.
- 1984 – Joined by State Route 32 from 4 miles (6.4 km) west of Jasper to Roads.
- unknown – Givens to Roads upgraded to divided highway.
- 1997 – Jasper to Givens upgraded to divided highway.
- 2003 – Routed along the former U.S. Route 33 alignment from 2 miles (3.2 km) north of Pomeroy to 1-mile (1.6 km) east of Pomeroy; routed along a former alignment of State Route 338 from Racine to Great Bend; former State Route 124 alignment from Racine to Great Bend decertified.
- 2004 - Routed along State Route 327 alignment from 3 miles (4.8 km) south of Wellston at interchange with State Route 32 to intersection at Roads.
- 2009 - Routed along Athens County Road 62 (Youba Ridge Rd.) from Hockingport to a new eastern terminus near Torch. The former section from Hockingport to Little Hocking had been permanently closed in 2005 due to a landslide.

=== Before 1926 ===
- 1924 – Original route established; originally routed from Sharonville to Franklin.
- 1926 – Entire route became a portion of the former U.S. Route 25.

== Major junctions ==
County	Location	mi	km	Destinations	Notes
Clinton	Clark Township	0.00	0.00	SR 134	
Highland	Hillsboro	10.38	16.70	US 50 west (West Main Street)	Western end of US 50 concurrency
Highland	Hillsboro	10.74	17.28	SR 73 north (Elm Street)	Western end of SR 73 concurrency
Highland	Hillsboro	10.87	17.49	US 68 / SR 73 south / SR 138 (High Street)	Eastern end of SR 73 concurrency
Highland	Hillsboro	11.30	18.19	US 50 east (Chillicothe Avenue)	Eastern end of US 50 concurrency
Highland	Marshall Township	18.76	30.19	SR 506 east / Main Street	Western terminus of SR 506
Highland	Brush Creek Township	26.86	43.23	SR 41 north – Bainbridge, Fort Hill State Memorial	Western end of SR 41 concurrency
Highland	Sinking Spring	27.85	44.82	SR 41 south / Water Street – Serpent Mound	Eastern end of SR 41 concurrency
Pike	Sunfish–Pebble township line	43.01	69.22	SR 772 north – Lake White State Park	Western end of SR 772 concurrency
Pike	Newton Township	45.25	72.82	SR 32 west / SR 772 south (James A. Rhodes Appalachian Highway) – Cincinnati	Eastern end of SR 772 concurrency; western end of SR 32 concurrency
Pike	Newton Township	48.95	78.78	SR 104 – Portsmouth, Waverly	
Pike	Seal Township	50.38– 50.51	81.08– 81.29	US 23 – Portsmouth, Chillicothe	Interchange
Pike	Seal Township	53.80	86.58	SR 220 west / CR 18 (Schuster Road) – Waverly	Eastern terminus of SR 220
Pike	Marion Township	61.10	98.33	SR 335 – Beaver, Stockdale	
Jackson	Scioto Township	69.11	111.22	SR 776 – Jackson	
Jackson	Franklin Township	72.07	115.99	SR 139 – Minford, Jackson	
Jackson	Lick Township	74.34– 74.64	119.64– 120.12	SR 93 (Main Street) – Jackson, Oak Hill	Interchange
Jackson	Lick Township	75.18– 75.66	120.99– 121.76	US 35 – Gallipolis, Chillicothe	Interchange
Jackson	Milton Township	80.59– 80.74	129.70– 129.94	SR 32 east (James A. Rhodes Appalachian Highway) / SR 327 north – Athens, Wellston	Interchange; eastern end of SR 32 concurrency; western end of SR 327 concurrency
Jackson	Milton Township	81.20	130.68	SR 327 south / CR 78 (Fairgreens Road)	Eastern end of SR 327 concurrency
Vinton	Wilkesville	93.36	150.25	SR 160 north (Main Street) – Hamden	Western end of SR 160 concurrency
Vinton	Wilkesville	96.63	155.51	SR 160 south (Mill Street) – Vinton, Gallipolis	Eastern end of SR 160 concurrency
Meigs	Salem Township	101.56	163.44	SR 325 south – Vinton	Northern terminus of SR 325
Meigs	Salisbury Township	110.73	178.20	SR 7 south – Gallipolis	Western end of SR 7 concurrency
Meigs	Salisbury Township	111.76	179.86	SR 143 north – Harrisonville	Southern terminus of SR 143
Meigs	Salisbury Township	114.05– 114.72	183.55– 184.62	US 33 / SR 7 north / SR 833 begins – Athens, Columbus, Ravenswood, W.Va.	Interchange; eastern end of SR 7 concurrency; western end of SR 833 concurrency
Meigs	Pomeroy	116.25	187.09	SR 733 east (Chester Road)	Western terminus of SR 733
Meigs	Pomeroy	116.49	187.47	SR 833 south (Main Street)	Eastern end of SR 833 concurrency
Meigs	Lebanon Township	139.86	225.08	US 33 – Pomeroy, Ravenswood, W.Va. to I-77	
Meigs	Olive Township	151.51	243.83	SR 248 west – Chester	Eastern terminus of SR 248
Meigs	Olive Township	156.39	251.69	SR 681 west	Eastern terminus of SR 681
Athens	Troy Township	161.61	260.09	SR 144 north – Coolville	Southern terminus of SR 144
Athens	Troy Township	165.51	266.36	US 50 / SR 7 / SR 32 (James A. Rhodes Appalachian Highway)	
1.000 mi = 1.609 km; 1.000 km = 0.621 mi: Concurrency terminus
