= Ohio State Route 833 =

State highway in Meigs County, Ohio, US

State Route 833

Route information
- Maintained by ODOT
- Length: 5.10 mi (8.21 km)
- Existed: 2003–present

Major junctions
- West end: WV 62 in Pomeroy
- SR 124 in Pomeroy; SR 733 in Pomeroy
- East end: US 33 / SR 7 / SR 124 near Pomeroy

Location
- Country: United States
- State: Ohio
- Counties: Meigs

Highway system
- Ohio State Highway System; Interstate; US; State; Scenic
← SR 824	→ SR 835

State Route 833 (SR 833) is a 5.10-mile-long (8.21 km) east–west state highway in the southern portion of the U.S. state of Ohio. Its western terminus is at the West Virginia state line in Pomeroy, where it provides a connection to West Virginia Route 62 (WV 62) via the Pomeroy-Mason Bridge across the Ohio River. Its eastern terminus is at an interchange with U.S. Route 33, SR 7, and SR 124 approximately 2 miles (3.2 km) north of Pomeroy.

Established in 2003, SR 833 follows the former alignment of US 33, which was given a new, more direct route into West Virginia through Ravenswood, West Virginia and on Interstate 77 (I-77) in West Virginia. The West Virginia portion of decertified U.S. Route 33 was replaced by extending WV 62 to Ripley, West Virginia.

== Route description ==
SR 833 exists entirely within the southern part of Meigs County. This state highway is not included within the National Highway System (NHS). The NHS is a network of routes identified as being most important for the nation's economy, mobility and defense.

== History ==
When US 33 was re-routed through Meigs County in 2003 along SR 7, then easterly onto a new alignment onto the Ravenswood Bridge across the Ohio River into Ravenswood, West Virginia and a more direct connection with I-77, the former routing of US 33, running from the connection with WV 62 at the Pomeroy-Mason Bridge, through Pomeroy, and concurrently with SR 124 to the US 33/SR 7 interchange north of Pomeroy was given the designation of SR 833.

== Major intersections ==
The entire route is in Meigs County.

Location	mi	km	Destinations	Notes
Pomeroy	0.00	0.00	To WV 62	West Virginia state line on Pomeroy-Mason Bridge
Pomeroy	2.84	4.57	SR 124 east – Syracuse, Racine	Southern end of SR 124 concurrency
Pomeroy	3.08	4.96	SR 733 west (Chester Road)	Western terminus of SR 733
Salisbury Township	5.10	8.21	US 33 / SR 7 / SR 124 west – Athens, Gallipolis, Ravenswood	Interchange; northern end of SR 124 concurrency
1.000 mi = 1.609 km; 1.000 km = 0.621 mi: Concurrency terminus
