= Meigs County Courthouse =

Meigs County Courthouse may refer to:

- Meigs County Courthouse (Ohio) in Pomeroy, Ohio
- Meigs County Courthouse (Tennessee) in Decatur, Tennessee
- Old Meigs County Courthouse in Chester, Ohio
