= Ohio State Route 733 =

State highway in Meigs County, Ohio, US

State Route 733
- Chester Road

Route information
- Maintained by ODOT
- Length: 2.24 mi (3.60 km)
- Existed: 2013–present

Major junctions
- West end: SR 124 / SR 833 in Pomeroy
- East end: US 33 / SR 7 in Salisbury Township

Location
- Country: United States
- State: Ohio
- Counties: Meigs

Highway system
- Ohio State Highway System; Interstate; US; State; Scenic
← SR 732	→ SR 734

State Route 733 (SR 733) is a state highway in south-central Meigs County, Ohio. At a length of 2.24 miles (3.60 km) long, the route acts as a connector from State Routes 124 and 833 in the north-easternmost extents of Pomeroy to an interchange with US 33 and SR 7 near the unincorporated community of Five Points within Salisbury Township. The road itself is the former routing of SR 7 before it was moved onto an expressway; following 15 years of county maintenance and control as Meigs County Road 7A, this segment of road assumed state jurisdiction again in late 2013.

== Route description ==
The route begins at an intersection with State Routes 124 and 833, which is also known as Nye Avenue, in the village of Pomeroy, about a quarter-mile (0.4 km) north of the Ohio River. SR 733 heads northeast in a small valley formed by a stream through mostly forested areas with a few houses dotting the road way. The route only stays in Pomeroy for a short time; it enters Salisbury Township shortly after starting, clips the northwestern part of Sutton Township, and re-enters Salisbury Township and remains there for the remainder. The end of the route is at a grade-separated diamond interchange with US 33 and SR 7. SR 733 ends at the first ramp to eastbound US 33 since SR 7 forms a concurrency with US 33 west of this point. US 33 continues on an expressway east towards Ravenswood, West Virginia while SR 7 travels northeast as a surface road towards Belpre.

== History ==
The roadway that now houses SR 733 is the original route of SR 7 out of Pomeroy. SR 7 would remain on this route until April 6, 1998, when it was moved onto the new Pomeroy-Middleport Bypass expressway north of the village. On that date, the portion of Chester Road from then-US 33 / SR 124 (now SR 124 and SR 833) and the new interchange became Meigs County Road 7A. Later as traffic increased along the route, the Meigs County Commissioners and Engineer requested that the Ohio Department of Transportation (ODOT) assume maintenance along the route again. Following a two-week public comment period, the route became a part of the state highway system again after 15 years of county maintenance. The number 733 was specifically chosen for the new route due to the presence of Routes 7 and 33.

The addition of SR 733 into the state highway system came at the same time another state highway in northern Meigs County, SR 692 was transferred to county jurisdiction due to declining traffic. It also came about the same time a proposed section of SR 124 from its western intersection with SR 7 to the Pomeroy–Mason Bridge was officially eliminated from state logs and maps.

== Major junctions ==
The entire route is in Meigs County.

Location	mi	km	Destinations	Notes
Pomeroy	0.00	0.00	SR 124 / SR 833 (Nye Avenue) – Athens, Gallipolis	
Salisbury Township	2.24	3.60	US 33 / SR 7 – Belpre, Ravenswood	
1.000 mi = 1.609 km; 1.000 km = 0.621 mi
