= Starcher =

Starcher is a surname. It may refer to:

- Buddy Starcher (1906–2001), American country music singer
- Larry Starcher (1942-2022), American judge, served on the Supreme Court of Appeals of West Virginia
- Virginia Starcher (1930–2012), American politician, served on the West Virginia House of Delegates from 1986–1990
