= U.S. Route 33 in Ohio =

Section of US Numbered Highway in Ohio, US

U.S. Route 33
- Route of US 33 highlighted in red

Route information
- Maintained by ODOT
- Length: 236.80 mi (381.09 km)
- Existed: 1926–present

Major junctions
- West end: US 33 west of Willshire
- US 127 near Rockford; I-75 in Wapakoneta; US 36 in Marysville; US 42 near Dublin; US 23 in Columbus; US 40 in Columbus; I-70 / I-71 in Columbus; US 22 near Lancaster; US 50 in Athens
- East end: US 33 at Ravenswood Bridge into Ravenswood, WV

Location
- Country: United States
- State: Ohio
- Counties: Van Wert, Mercer, Auglaize, Logan, Union, Franklin, Fairfield, Hocking, Athens, Meigs

Highway system
- United States Numbered Highway System; List; Special; Divided; Ohio State Highway System; Interstate; US; State; Scenic
← SR 32	→ SR 33

U.S. Route 33 (US 33) is a United States Numbered Highway running from near Elkhart, Indiana, to Richmond, Virginia. Within the state of Ohio, it is a predominantly southeast–northwest highway running from west of Willshire before crossing over into West Virginia via the Ravenswood Bridge over the Ohio River. The route runs through largely rural territory throughout most of the state's west-central, central, and southeastern regions, although it also passes through large portions of downtown Columbus.

== Route description ==
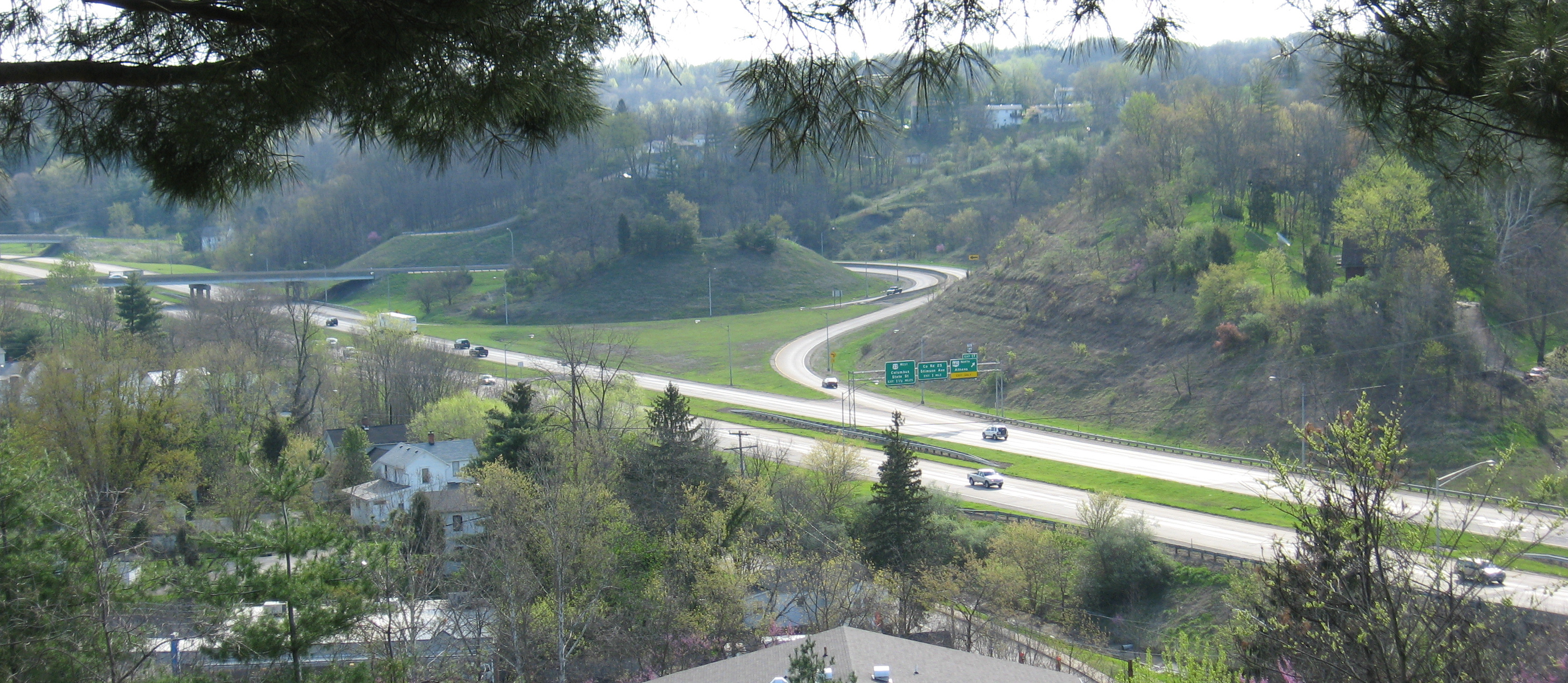
US 33 during its brief concurrency with US 50 and SR 32 in Athens

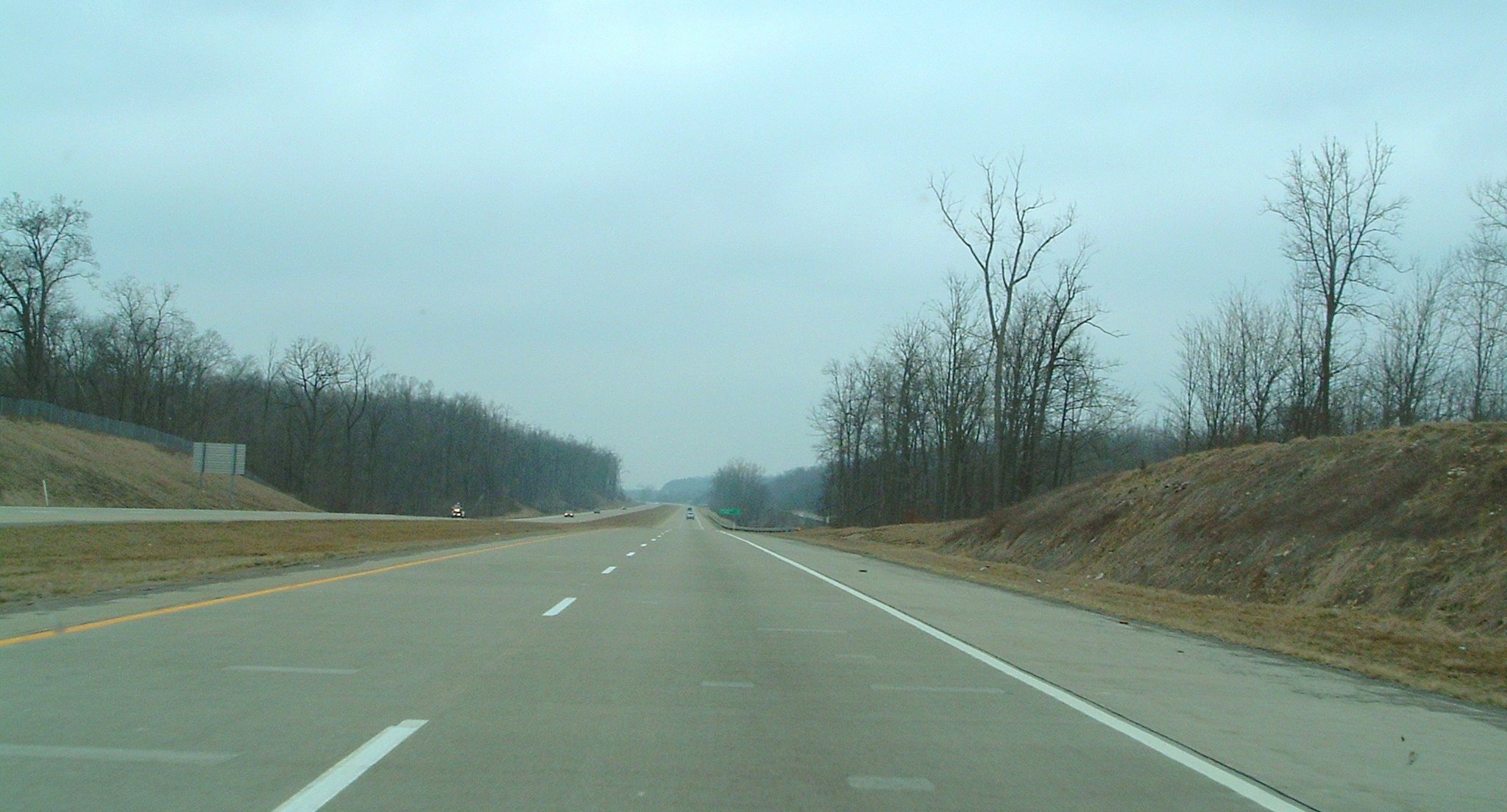
US 33 east of Bellefontaine passing through the Marmon Valley

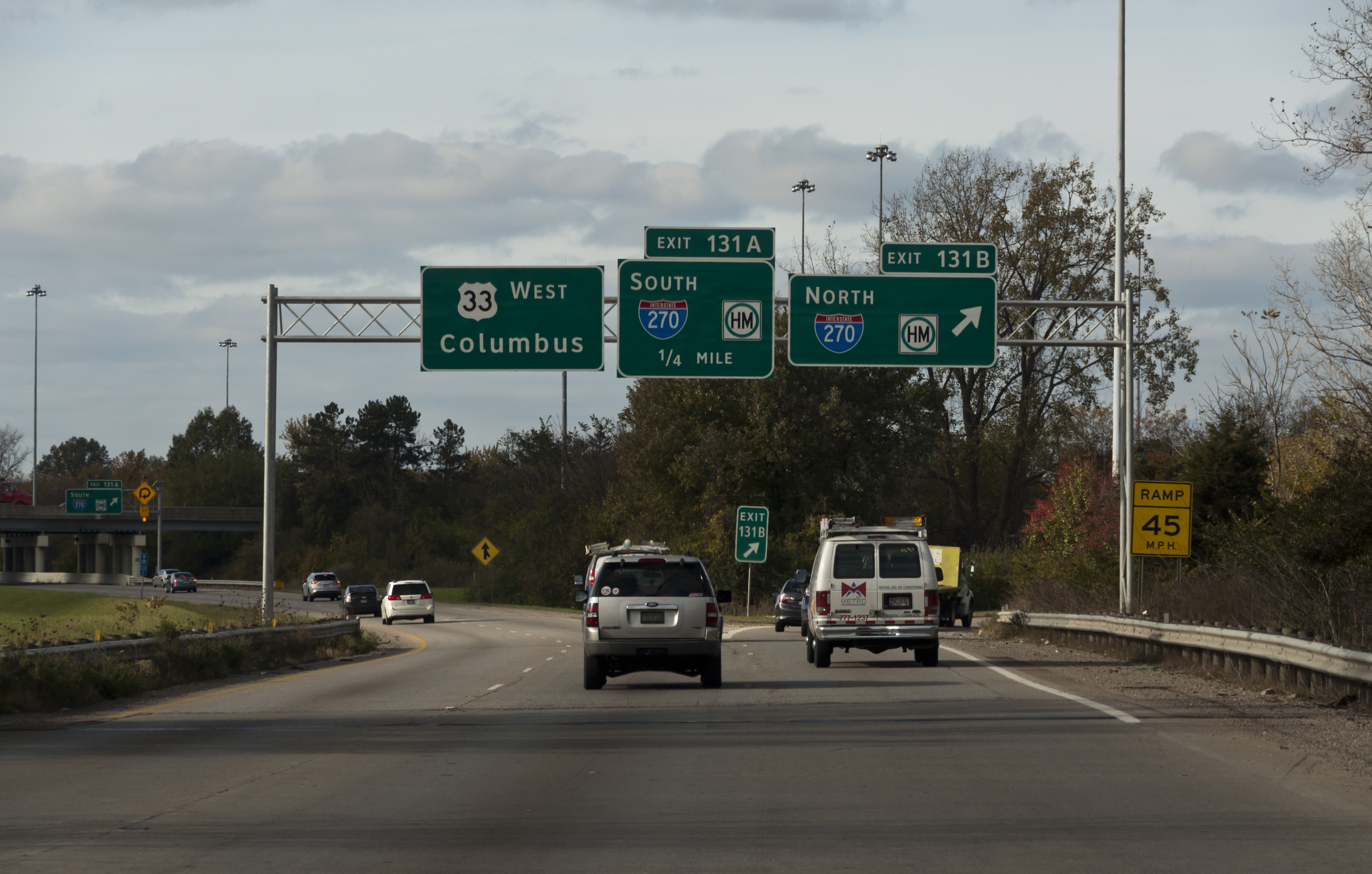
US 33 and I-270 Interchange

US 33 enters Ohio from Indiana, to the west, near Willshire in Van Wert County as a two-lane highway, continuing southeast through Mercer County, crossing US 127, then entering Auglaize County, joining limited-access Ohio Route 29 (SR 29) briefly near St. Marys, continuing east as a four-lane parkway, then a controlled-access highway near Wapakoneta, where it intersects Interstate 75 (I-75).

East of I-75, the road once again becomes two-lane as it continues to Lakeview and Russells Point south of Indian Lake. At the terminus of SR 117 near Huntsville, US 33 becomes a limited-access, multi-lane highway before reaching US 68 at Bellefontaine where it resumes as a controlled-access freeway, passing Campbell Hill, the highest point in Ohio, and continuing around Marysville. Entering Franklin County, the road runs concurrently with SR 161, then intersects I-270 in Dublin.

After I-270, the route loses its controlled-access status and passes through the Dublin Historic District and crosses the Scioto River. The overlap with SR 161 then ends, and US 33 heads south on Riverside Drive towards downtown Columbus, following the Scioto River along the western border of Upper Arlington, where it passes Griggs Reservoir, one of the main sources of water for Columbus. The road changes names two times in this area, first to Dublin Road at the intersection with Trabue Road, and then to Spring/Long Streets at SR 315. The route continues south on 3rd/4th Streets and then east on Livingston Avenue, heading towards the Columbus neighborhood of Driving Park.

In Bexley, US 33 veers southeast onto College Avenue, then intersects I-70. After Petzinger Road, the route becomes a controlled-access highway, subsequently intersecting SR 104, I-270 (for the second time), and SR 317 (Hamilton Road). Following the Ebright Road near Blacklick Estates, the highway continues to the southeast as a non-limited-access expressway.

Beginning at Carroll, US 33 bypasses Lancaster as a limited-access freeway completed in 2005. Continuing southeast, the highway enters Ohio's scenic Hocking Hills region near Sugar Grove as an expressway. East of Logan, the highway again becomes limited-access for approximately 13 miles (21 km). As the route approaches Nelsonville, traffic continues on the limited access four-lane bypass that opened October 1, 2013. Further southeast towards Athens, the expressway design resumes, followed by a brief limited-access section around Athens, where it joins the concurrent US 50/SR 32 for about three miles (4.8 km). South of Athens, US 33 continues as a limited-access highway, bypassing Pomeroy, intersecting SR 124 and SR 7, and continuing to the Ohio River in Meigs County, crossing the Ohio on the two-lane cantilever Ravenswood Bridge, and entering West Virginia in Ravenswood.

In total, US 33 traverses 236.8 miles (381.1 km) across the Buckeye State.

== History ==
The Ravenswood Bridge was built in 1981 and originally carried the designation SR 824 until 2003, when US 33 was rerouted on a new bypass out of Pomeroy and connecting to the bridge, supplanting SR 824 in the process.

In 2013, an expressway bypass was completed around Nelsonville. This was done to reduce traffic congestion in the area, as the original routing through Nelsonville was only two lanes wide.

As of 2021, the route had an average of 19,846 vehicles per day.

== Future ==
From mid-2025 to mid-2028, the existing intersection at Pickerington Road in Violet Township, Fairfield County, will be converted to an interchange by the Ohio Department of Transportation (ODOT) at an estimated cost of $51,270,000.

From mid-2025 to 2028, ODOT plans to widen 25 miles (40 km) of US 33 in Athens and Meigs counties from two lanes to four-lane divided highway; these are the final two-lane sections of US 33 between Columbus and the Ohio River, which exist in two non-contiguous segments. The first is 10.78 miles (17.35 km) from south of Athens through Alexander and Lodi townships in Athens County to Darwin in Bedford Township, Meigs County. In this segment, intersections will be converted to interchanges at Pleasant Hill Road, Pleasanton Road and Rainbow Lake Road, the existing grade separation/two-quadrant interchange at SR 681 will be improved, and seven bridges will be built. The second is 14.19 miles (22.84 km) in Meigs County from US 33's interchange with SR 7/SR 733 at the Chester–Salisbury township line near the community of Five Points, southeast to the Ohio River and the Ravenswood Bridge. In this segment, left-turn lanes will be added to at-grade intersections throughout, and three bridges will be built. In both of the segments, the roadway will be resurfaced; the estimated cost for both segments is $274 million.

== Major intersections ==
County	Location	mi	km	Exit	Destinations	Notes
Van Wert	Willshire Township	0.00	0.00		US 33 north – Decatur, Fort Wayne	Indiana state line
Van Wert	Willshire	0.53	0.85		SR 81 west to SR 124	Western end of SR 81 concurrency
Van Wert	Willshire	0.75	1.21		SR 81 east / SR 49 north (Walcott Street)	Eastern end of SR 81 concurrency; western end of SR 49 concurrency
Van Wert	Willshire	0.94	1.51		SR 49 south	Eastern end of SR 49 concurrency
Mercer	Rockford	9.29	14.95		SR 118 north to SR 117	Western end of SR 118 concurrency
Mercer	Rockford	9.81	15.79		SR 118 south	Eastern end of SR 118 concurrency
Mercer	Dublin Township	13.64	21.95		SR 707 west	Western end of SR 707 concurrency
Mercer	Dublin Township	14.16	22.79		US 127 / SR 707 east – Van Wert, Celina	Eastern end of SR 707 concurrency
Mercer	Neptune	19.91	32.04		SR 197 – Buckland, Celina	
Auglaize	St. Marys	25.00	40.23	25	SR 29 – St. Marys, Celina	Western end of expressway
Auglaize	St. Marys	27.25	43.85	27	SR 66 – Spencerville, St. Marys	
Auglaize	Moulton Township	31.60	50.86	31	County Road 91 — Moulton	
Auglaize	Wapakoneta	35.15	56.57	35	County Road 33A — Wapakoneta	
Auglaize	Wapakoneta	36.97	59.50	36	Hardin Pike — Wapakoneta	
Auglaize	Wapakoneta	37.23	59.92	37	SR 67 / SR 198 / SR 501 / County Road 25A – Wapakoneta	Western terminus of SR 67; southern terminus of SR 198 and SR 501; former US 25
Auglaize	Wapakoneta	38.51	61.98	38	I-75 – Toledo, Dayton	Exit 110 on I-75
Auglaize	Wapakoneta	39.10	62.93		Wapak Fisher Road – Fryburg	Eastern end of expressway
Auglaize	Union Township	43.02	69.23		SR 65 north – Uniopolis, Lima	Western end of SR 65 concurrency
Auglaize	Union Township	45.07	72.53		SR 65 south – Jackson Center	Eastern end of SR 65 concurrency
Auglaize	New Hampshire	49.95	80.39		SR 196 north (Main Street) / SR 385 east (Market Street)	Southern terminus of SR 196; western terminus of SR 385
Logan	Stokes Township	52.89	85.12		SR 366 east	Western terminus of SR 366
Logan	Lakeview	55.22	88.87		SR 235 – Ada, Fairborn, Indian Lake	
Logan	Russells Point	56.58	91.06		SR 720 west	Eastern terminus of SR 720
Logan	Russells Point	57.20	92.05		SR 708 – Orchard Island	
Logan	Washington Township	61.29	98.64		SR 274 – Huntsville, Jackson Center	
Logan	Washington Township	62.48	100.55	62	SR 117 – Huntsville, Lima	Eastern terminus of SR 117
Logan	Harrison Township	64.15	103.24	Western end of freeway		
Logan	Bellefontaine	67.18	108.12	67	US 68 – Bellefontaine, Kenton	
Logan	Bellefontaine	68.72	110.59	68	SR 540 – Bellefontaine	
Logan	Jefferson Township	71.39	114.89	71	County Road 10 — Zanesfield, Bellefontaine	
Logan	Jefferson Township	73.48	118.25	73	SR 292 – East Liberty, Valley Hi	
Logan	Perry Township	77.47	124.68	77	SR 347 – East Liberty	
Union	Allen Township	81.81	131.66	81	SR 287 / SR 739 (Honda Parkway)	Western access to Marysville Auto Plant; southern terminus of SR 739 and eastern terminus of SR 287
Union	Allen Township	83.86	134.96	83	Honda Parkway	East access to Marysville Auto Plant
Union	Paris Township	89.01	143.25	89A	SR 245 / Northwest Parkway – Marysville	Westbound exit and eastbound entrance via Exit 89
Union	Paris Township	89.51	144.05	89B	US 36 west / SR 4 south – Urbana, Springfield	Western end of US 36 and SR 4 concurrencies
Union	Marysville	91.51	147.27	91	SR 31 – Kenton	
Union	Marysville	91.84	147.80	92	SR 4 north – Marion	Eastern end of SR 4 concurrency
Union	Marysville	93.35	150.23	93	US 36 east – Delaware	Eastern end of US 36 concurrency
Union	Marysville	96.00	154.50	96	Scottslawn Road	
Union	Jerome Township	101.53	163.40	101	US 42 – Delaware, Plain City	
Union	Dublin	106.05	170.67	106	SR 161 west (Post Road) – Plain City	Western end of SR 161 concurrency
Franklin	Dublin	107.58	173.13	107	Avery-Muirfield Drive — Dublin	
Franklin	Dublin	108.84	175.16	108	I-270 – Grove City	Exit 17 on I-270; eastern end of freeway
Franklin	Dublin	109.98	177.00		SR 745 north (High Street)	
Franklin	Dublin	110.19	177.33		SR 161 east (Dublin Granville Road) / SR 257 north (Riverside Drive)	Southern terminus of SR 257; eastern end of SR 161 concurrency; roundabout
Franklin	Columbus	119.27	191.95		I-670 east to SR 315	I-670 exit 1A
Franklin	Columbus	121.47	195.49		I-670 west – Dayton	I-670 exit 2A
Franklin	Columbus	121.66	195.79		SR 315 south to I-71	SR 315 exit 1C
Franklin	Columbus	122.92	197.82		US 23 north (4th Street) to I-71 north / I-670	Western end of US 23 overlap
Franklin	Columbus	122.92	197.82		SR 3 north (Long Street)	Western end of SR 3 overlap
Franklin	Columbus	123.11	198.13		US 40 / SR 16 / US 62 north (Broad Street)	Western end of US 62 overlap
Franklin	Columbus	123.44	198.66		US 62 south / SR 3 south (Rich Street) to SR 315	Eastern end of US 62 / SR 3 overlap
Franklin	Columbus	123.72	199.11		US 23 south (Fulton Street)	Eastern end of US 23 overlap
Franklin	Columbus	123.74	199.14		I-70 / I-71 south – Wheeling	No access to northbound I-71; exit 100B on I-70
Franklin	Columbus	126.61	203.76		I-70 – Downtown, Wheeling	I-70 exit 103B
Franklin	Columbus	128.19	206.30	128A	I-70 west – Downtown	Westbound exit and eastbound entrance; exit 105A on I-70
Franklin	Columbus	129.04	207.67	128C	To I-70 east / James Road – Wheeling	Westbound exit and eastbound entrance
Franklin	Columbus	129.14– 129.54	207.83– 208.47	128B	Winchester Pike	Eastbound exit and westbound entrance; western end of freeway
Franklin	Columbus	129.25	208.01	129	SR 104 (Refugee Road)	Northern terminus of SR 104; signed as exits 129A (west) and 129B (east) westbound
Franklin	Columbus	131.03	210.87	131	I-270	Exit 46 on I-270; signed as exits 131A (south) and 131B (north)
Franklin	Columbus	132.23	212.80	132	SR 317 (Hamilton Road)	
Franklin	Canal Winchester	135.91	218.73	135	SR 674 – Canal Winchester	Northern terminus of SR 674; eastern end of freeway
Fairfield	Violet Township	138.60	223.06	139	Hill Road / Diley Road	
Fairfield	Violet Township	140.70	226.43	141	Pickerington Road	New interchange to begin construction in 2025
Fairfield	Carroll	143.35– 144.62	230.70– 232.74	143	High Street / Winchester Road – Carroll	Opened 2017
Fairfield	Greenfield Township	145.18	233.64	145	Lancaster Business Route	Eastbound exit and westbound entrance
Fairfield	Greenfield Township	146.27	235.40	146	CR 31 — Lithopolis, Coonpath Road	Westbound exit and eastbound entrance
Fairfield	Hocking Township	150.28	241.85	150	SR 188 – Lancaster, Circleville	
Fairfield	Hocking Township	152.55	245.51	153	US 22 – Lancaster, Circleville	
Fairfield	Berne Township	158.16– 158.41	254.53– 254.94	158	Lancaster Business Route, Tarklin Road	Lancaster Business Route signed westbound only
Hocking	Good Hope Township	162.01	260.73		SR 374 south – Cantwell Cliffs	Northern terminus of SR 374
Hocking	Falls Township	166.97	268.71	166	SR 180 / CR 33A – Laurelville	
Hocking	Logan	170.29	274.06	170	SR 664 – Logan, Bremen	
Hocking	Logan	172.23	277.18	172	SR 93 – Logan, McArthur	
Hocking	Logan	174.17	280.30	174	SR 328 south – Logan	Northern terminus of SR 328
Hocking	Green Township	177.22	285.21	177	SR 595 north – New Straitsville	Southern terminus of SR 595
Athens	No major junctions					
Hocking	Ward Township	182.07	293.01	182	Nelsonville Business Route	To SR 278
Athens	Nelsonville	185.79	299.00	185	SR 78 east (Happy Hollow Road) to SR 691 south / Nelsonville Business Route	Western terminus of SR 78
Athens	Dover Township	191.88	308.80	191	SR 682 – The Plains	
Athens	Athens	194.08	312.34	194	SR 13 north / SR 550 east – Chauncey, Amesville	Southern terminus of SR 13; western terminus of SR 550
Athens	Athens	196.36	316.01	196	State Street — Athens	
Athens	Athens Township	196.85	316.80	197A	US 50 east / SR 32 east – Belpre, Parkersburg	Western end of US 50 and SR 32 concurrencies
Athens	Athens Township	197.29	317.51	197B	Stimson Avenue, Rock Riffle Road	Westbound entrance at US 50 exit
Athens	Athens	198.32	319.17	198	SR 682 north to SR 56 – Athens	Southern terminus of SR 682
Athens	Athens	199.08– 199.12	320.39– 320.45	199	US 50 west / SR 32 west (Richland Avenue) – Chillicothe, Cincinnati	Eastern end of US 50 and SR 32 concurrencies; separate exits eastbound for US 50/SR 32 and Richland Avenue
Athens	Alexander Township	201.38	324.09	Eastern end of freeway		
Athens	Alexander Township	201.63	324.49	—	Pleasant Hill Road	Future interchange; current at-grade intersection
Athens	Lodi Township	204.24	328.69	—	Pleasanton Road	Future interchange; current at-grade intersection
Athens	Lodi Township	207.27	333.57	—	Rainbow Lake Road	Future interchange; current at-grade intersection
Meigs	Bedford Township	211.30	340.05		SR 681 – Tuppers Plains, Albany	Future interchange; current grade separation/two-quadrant interchange
Meigs	Salisbury Township	218.77– 218.79	352.08– 352.11	—	SR 124 / SR 833 west / SR 7 – Gallipolis, Pomeroy	Interchange; US 33 and SR 124 exchange carriageways; eastern terminus of SR 833; western end of SR 7 concurrency
Meigs	Salisbury Township	219.09	352.59		County Road 20, County Road 25	Grade separation/two-quadrant interchange
Meigs	Chester–Salisbury township line	221.21	356.00	—	SR 733 west / SR 7 east / County Road 7A – Belpre, Pomeroy	Interchange; eastern end of SR 7 concurrency; eastern terminus of SR 733; eastern end of expressway
Meigs	Sutton Township	226.99	365.30		County Road 28	Grade separation/one-quadrant interchange
Meigs	Lebanon Township	233.89	376.41		SR 124 – Portland, Apple Grove	
Ohio River		236.80	381.09	Ravenswood Bridge; Ohio–West Virginia state line		
Ohio River		236.80	381.09		US 33 east – Charleston	Continuation into West Virginia
1.000 mi = 1.609 km; 1.000 km = 0.621 mi: Concurrency terminus; Incomplete access; Unopened

== See also ==
U.S. Route 33
Previous state: Indiana	Ohio	Next state: West Virginia
