= Pomeroy–Mason Bridge =

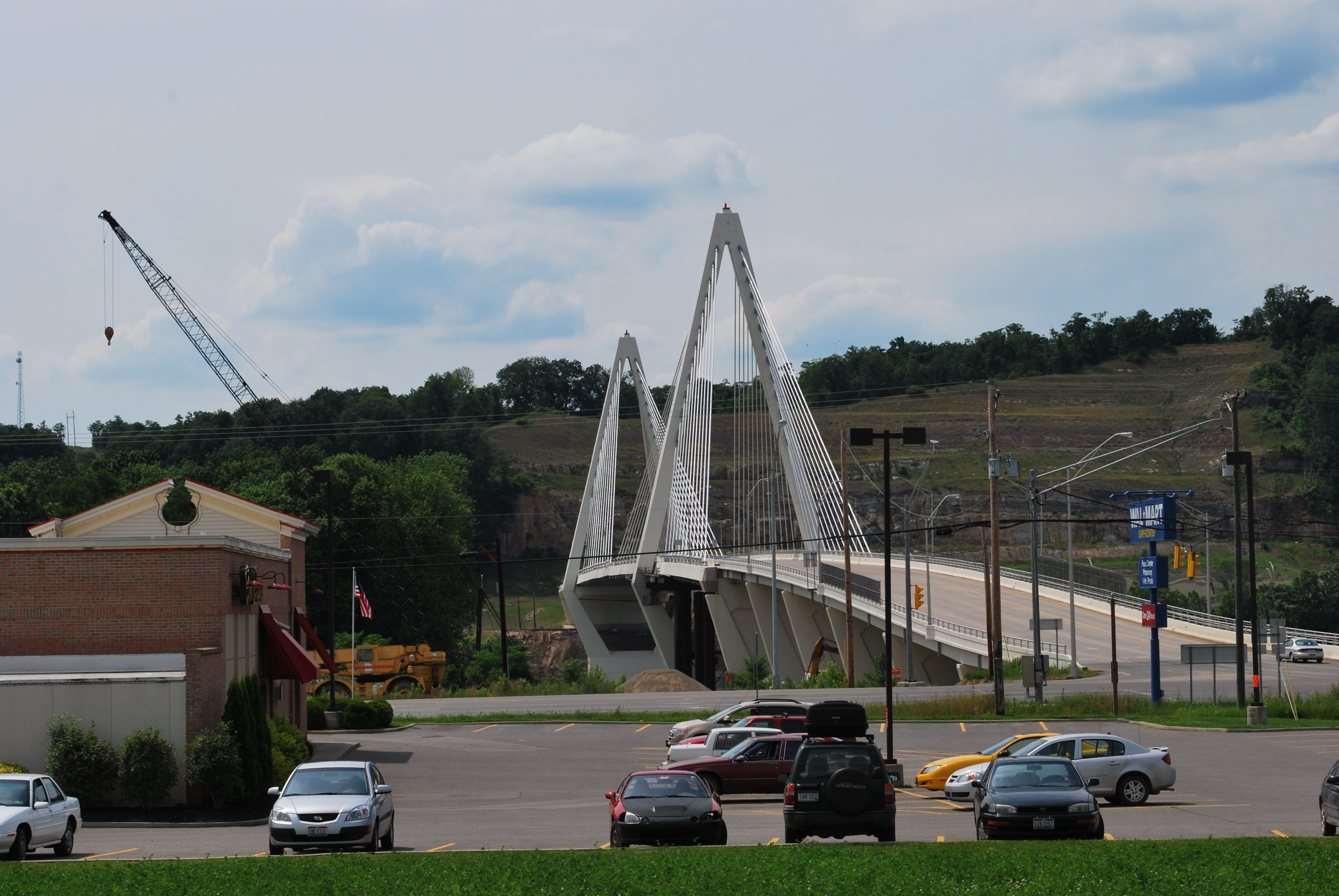
- View of bridge from West Virginia side
- Coordinates: 39°00′48″N 82°02′29″W
- Carries: 4 lanes of WV 62 Spur/ SR 833 & 1 sidewalk
- Crosses: Ohio River
- Locale: Pomeroy, Ohio/Mason, West Virginia
- Official name: Bridge of Honor
- Maintained by: West Virginia Department of Transportation

Characteristics
- Design: Cable Stayed
- Material: Concrete
- Total length: 1,852 ft (564 m)
- Width: 77 ft (23 m)
- Height: 248 ft (76 m)
- Longest span: 675 ft (206 m)
- No. of spans: 10
- Piers in water: 2
- Clearance below: 74 ft (23 m)

History
- Designer: URS Corp
- Construction start: 2003
- Construction end: 2008
- Opened: December 30, 2008

Location
- Interactive map of Pomeroy–Mason Bridge

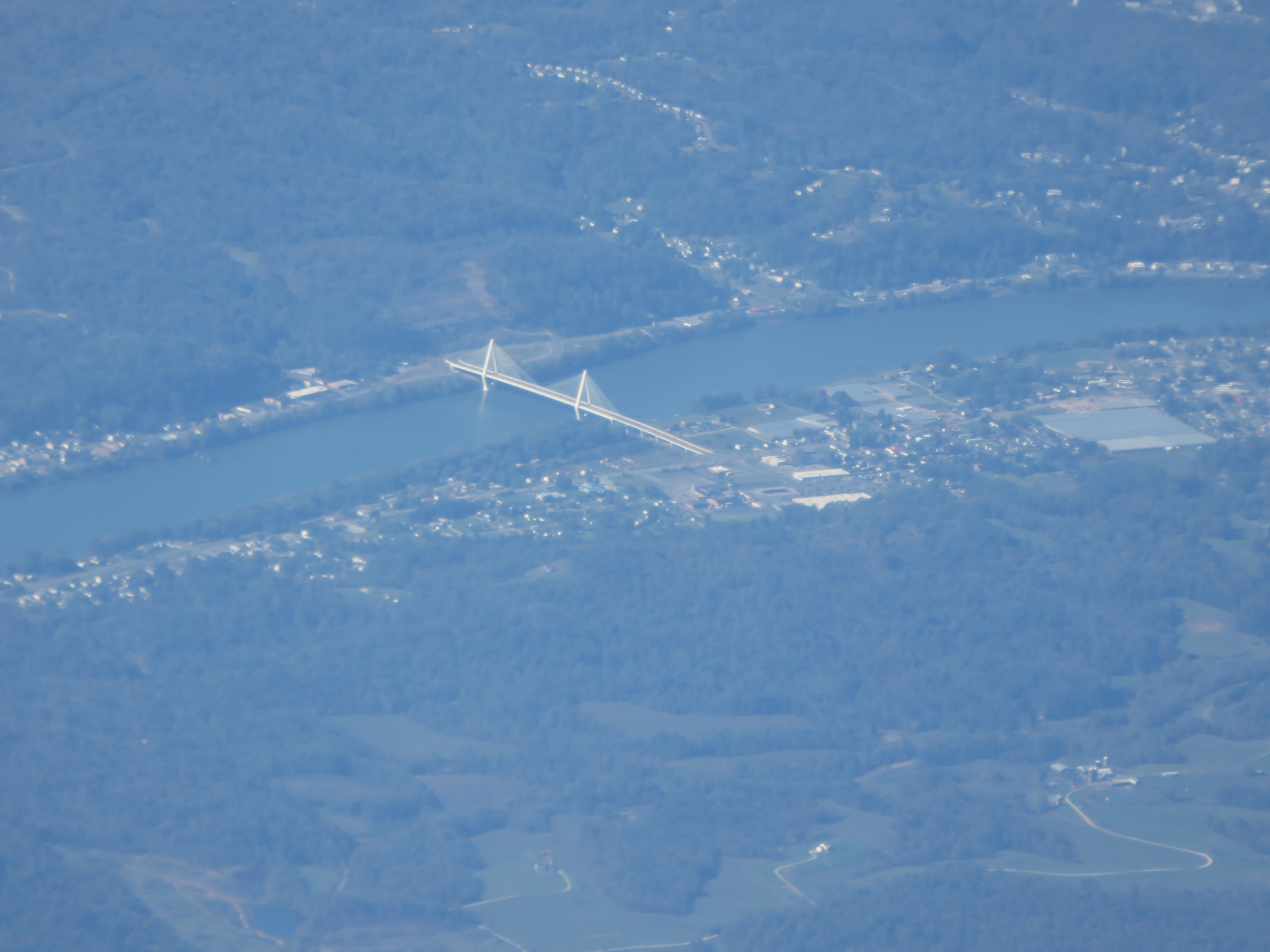
Aerial view of the bridge and surroundings

The Bridge of Honor, commonly known as the Pomeroy–Mason Bridge is a cable-stayed bridge over the Ohio River between the American cities of Pomeroy, Ohio and Mason, West Virginia. With construction being carried out by the C.J. Mahan Construction Company and overseen by the Ohio Department of Transportation, it was completed on December 30, 2008. Ownership of the bridge was transferred to the West Virginia Division of Highways upon completion. The crossing carries Ohio State Route 833 and West Virginia Route Spur 62.

== Construction issues ==
The bridge was originally scheduled to open in 2006. However, numerous unforeseen issues delayed the construction. Although work began in 2003, river flooding, poor soil stability, a rock slide, and potentially problematic formwork all caused setbacks in the building process. The final cost of the bridge was approximately US$65 million.

At night, the bridge is illuminated by purple lights shining on the cables and towers.

== Former bridge ==
Constructed in 1928, the two-lane Cantilever bridge span once carried U.S. Highway 33. In 2003, it was renumbered to State Route 833 when US 33 was relocated along a new super-two highway to the Ravenswood Bridge. The original two-lane span's center span was demolished on at 8:49 a.m. EDT on April 21, 2009, with several hundred spectators viewing from the Pomeroy levee. The demolition was also broadcast live via an Internet feed on WSAZ from Huntington, West Virginia. An eight-year-old boy was selected to press the detonation button. River traffic was halted for twenty-four hours to allow for clean-up. The remainder of the bridge was removed by June 2009. The cost to remove the center span was approximately $1 million US.

== See also ==
- List of crossings of the Ohio River
