= U.S. Route 33 =

US Numbered Highway in between Indiana and Virginia, US

U.S. Route 33
- US 33 highlighted in red

Route information
- Length: 709 mi (1,141 km)
- Existed: January 1, 1938–present

Major junctions
- North end: US 20 at Elkhart, IN
- US 6 at Ligonier, IN; I-69 / I-469 / US 24 / US 30 at Fort Wayne, IN; US 27 at Decatur, IN; I-75 at Wapakoneta, OH; I-270 at Dublin, Ohio; I-70 / I-270 at Columbus, OH; US 50 at Athens, OH; I-77 at Ripley, WV; I-79 at Weston, WV; I-64 at Dumbarton, VA; I-81 at Harrisonburg, VA
- East end: US 250 at Richmond, VA

Location
- Country: United States
- States: Virginia, West Virginia, Ohio, Indiana

Highway system
- United States Numbered Highway System; List; Special; Divided
← US 32	→ US 34

U.S. Route 33 (US 33) is a United States Numbered Highway that runs northwest–southeast for 709 miles (1,141 km) from northern Indiana to Richmond, Virginia, passing through Ohio and West Virginia en route. Although most odd-numbered U.S. routes are north–south, US 33 is labeled east–west throughout its route, except in Indiana where it is labeled north–south. It roughly follows a historic trail used by Native Americans from the Chesapeake Bay to Lake Michigan.

As of 2018, the highway's northern terminus is at US 20 in southeastern Elkhart, Indiana, although it once extended to St. Joseph, Michigan, and even to Lake Michigan Beach, Michigan. Until 1998, the route extended northward through South Bend, Indiana, to Niles. Its current eastern (or southern) terminus is Richmond, Virginia. State Route 33 (SR 33) then continues eastward through West Point to Stingray Point, on the Middle Peninsula and the Chesapeake Bay near Deltaville, Virginia.

Part of US 33 was created in conjunction with the Blue and Gray Trail in 1938 in order to promote a direct and scenic route between the Great Lakes and Virginia's historic Tidewater region.

== Route description ==
Lengths
	mi	km
IN	106	171
OH	237	381
WV	248	399
VA	139	224
Total	730	1,170

=== Indiana ===
From its terminus at US 20 on the southeast side of Elkhart, US 33 is a winding road that cuts diagonally from northwest to southeast through Northeast Indiana and serves as Main Street or a portion of Main Street in several cities and towns, including Elkhart, Dunlap, and Churubusco. The road is the main overland link between the Fort Wayne and South Bend metropolitan statistical areas.

On the west side of Fort Wayne, US 33 joins US 30 near Interstate 69 (I-69), then follows the Interstate south, intersecting with State Road 14 (SR 14) and US 24 before turning east to follow the I-469 bypass around the southwest side of Fort Wayne. At the intersection with SR 1 south of the Fort Wayne International Airport, I-469/US 33 turns to the northeast until it intersects US 27 at the Fort Wayne suburb of Hessen Cassel, where US 33 splits off to the southeast to follow US 27 as a combined highway toward Decatur.

At Decatur, US 33/US 27 becomes a north–south road before it intersects with US 224 and continues as such until US 33 splits from US 27 south of Decatur and heads east toward the Ohio state line, intersecting SR 101 at Pleasant Mills along the way.

=== Ohio ===
In Ohio, the highway runs at a generally southeast–northwest angle from the west-central to the southeastern part of the state, passing through mostly rural territory except for a significant portion running through downtown Columbus. Most of the route in the state, particularly east of Columbus, is expressway. The highway crosses over the Ravenswood Bridge into West Virginia.

=== West Virginia ===
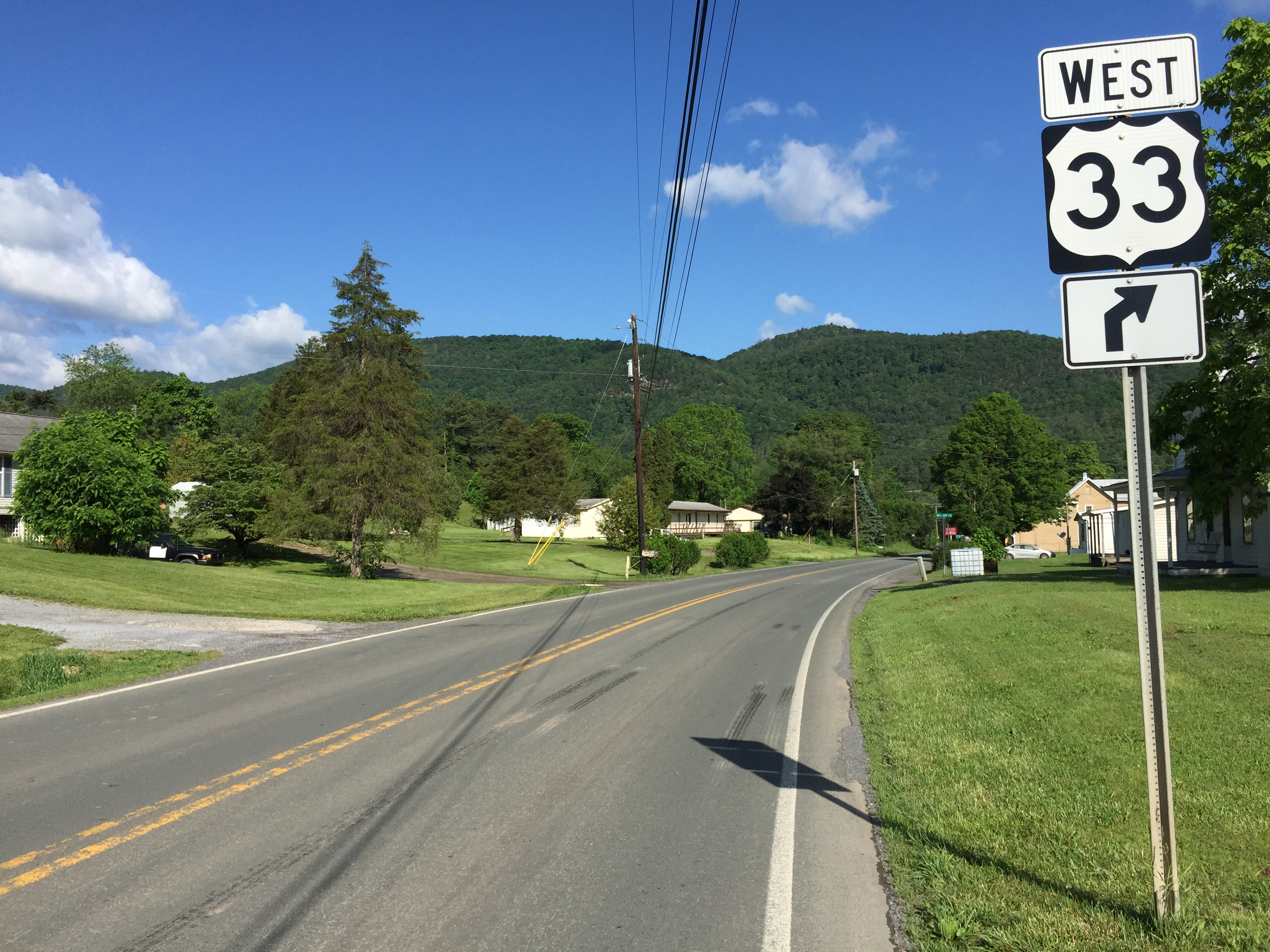
View west along US 33 in Pendleton County, West Virginia

US 33 extends 248 miles (399 km) in West Virginia, from the Ohio River at Ravenswood to the Virginia state line atop Shenandoah Mountain west of Harrisonburg, Virginia.

Shortly after entering West Virginia and crossing the Ohio River, US 33 turns south, joining I-77 to Ripley. The route then turns east from I-77, joining US 119 at Spencer, then passing through extremely rural areas of Roane, Calhoun, Gilmer, and Lewis counties.

US 33 intersects I-79 at Weston. From I-79 east, US 33 is a four-lane highway, part of Corridor H of the Appalachian Development Highway System. The four-lane segment continues on through rural areas of Upshur, and Randolph counties, to just a couple miles past Elkins.

At Harding, US 250 joins US 33 for several miles after Elkins, where US 33 joins West Virginia Route 55 (WV 55) and returns to a two-lane road, except for a seven-mile (11 km) section of four-lane across Kelly Mountain between Canfield and Bowden. Passing through the Monongahela National Forest, US 33 crosses the Eastern Continental Divide between Harman and Onego at about 3,240 feet (990 m) in elevation, entering Pendleton County, then descends the Allegheny Front along Seneca Creek, skirting the north end of Spruce Mountain, at 4,861 feet (1,482 m) the highest point of the Allegheny Mountains.

US 33 then joins WV 28 at Seneca Rocks and continues south in the Potomac River headwaters through scenic forest and farmland landscapes. Turning eastward from WV 28 at Judy Gap, US 33 crosses North Fork Mountain at about 3,600 feet (1,100 m), with a turnout on the western slope offering a scenic view of the Germany Valley below and the more distant Allegheny Front from Spruce Knob to Dolly Sods. US 220 joins US 33 for about half a mile in Franklin. After Franklin, US 33 continues eastward through rural areas, then climbs steeply to cross Shenandoah Mountain at Dry River Gap at about 3,450 feet (1,050 m) into Rockingham County, Virginia.

=== Virginia ===
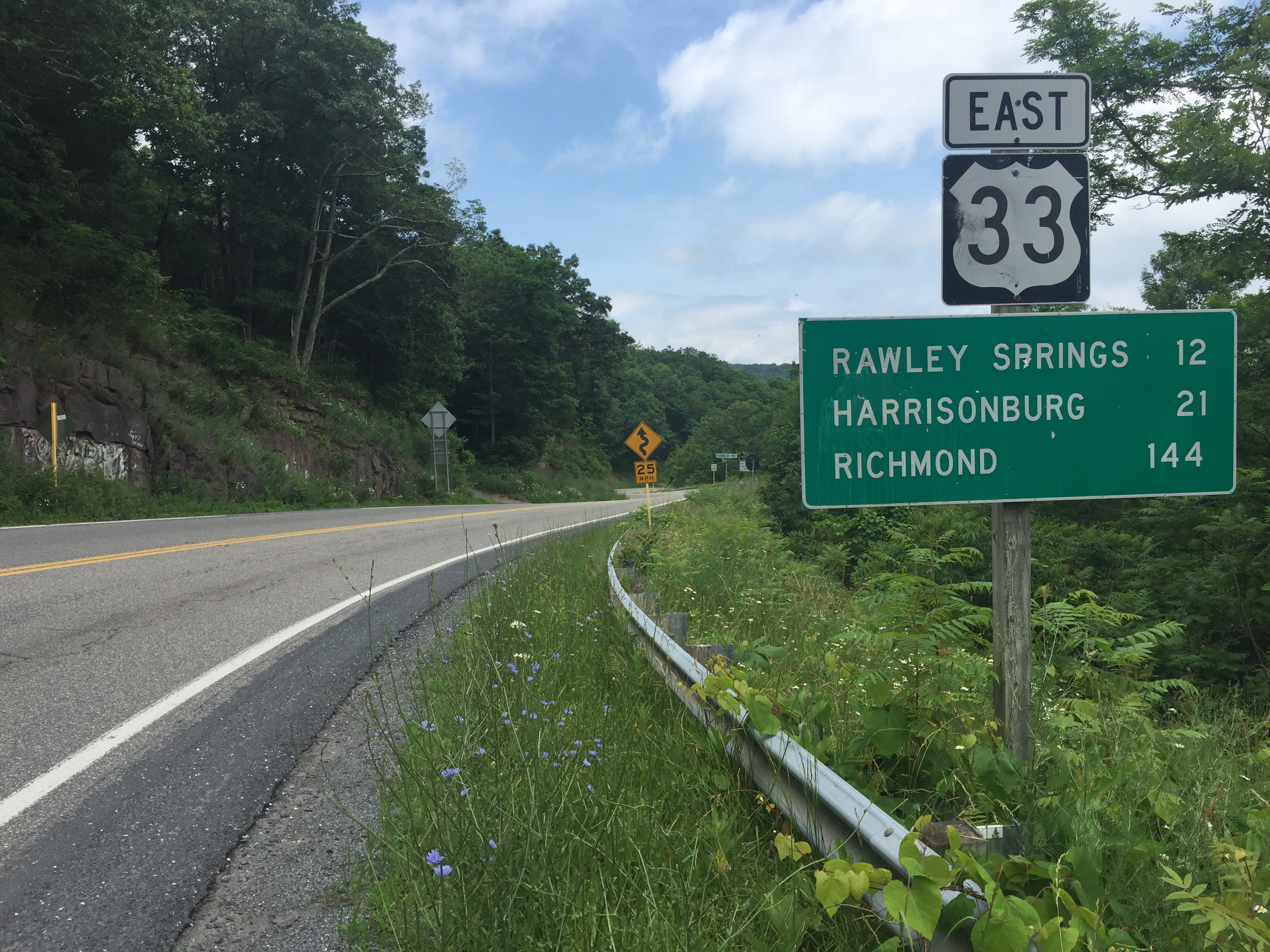
View east along US 33 just after entering Virginia from West Virginia in Rockingham County

US 33 extends 139 miles (224 km) in Virginia from the West Virginia state line west of Harrisonburg across the Shenandoah Valley, Blue Ridge Mountains, and Atlantic Piedmont to Richmond. It enters Virginia from West Virginia on Shenandoah Mountain. After going down the mountain, it passes through the unincorporated community of Rawley Springs. After traveling nine miles (14 km) from Rawley Springs, reaches the independent city of Harrisonburg and intersects major routes State Route 42 (SR 42), US 11, and I-81 before leaving the city. The four-lane highway passes around the southernmost end of Massanutten Mountain, towards Elkton. There, it intersects US 340. After leaving Elkton, the highway heads towards the Blue Ridge Mountains, once it gets to the mountains, it reduces to two lanes and becomes three lanes a few times. At Swift Run Gap it intersects Skyline Drive and enters Greene County. After going down the mountains, it goes back to four lanes and heads south of Stanardsville. After that, the route heads southeast towards US 29 in Ruckersville. After that, it heads south east and enters Orange County. It heads east north of the Albemarle County line and intersects SR 20 on a concurrency. After that, it goes through a small part of the Southwest Mountains towards Gordonsville. It goes on a roundabout with US 15 and SR 231. US 33 heads east with US 15 and into Louisa County. Shortly after, US 33 splits from US 15 and heads southeast towards Louisa. In Trevilians, it intersects SR 22.The route then goes east toward Montpelier. In Montpelier, the route goes southeast towards Interstate 295. After I-295, US 33 goes a few miles to an interchange with I-64. Just after, the route meets US 250. The two routes head southeast into Downtown Richmond. Both meet their eastern terminus there. From Richmond, "Route 33" continues east as SR 33 across the Atlantic coastal plain through the Tidewater region of the Middle Peninsula to reach the Chesapeake Bay at Stingray Point just east of Deltaville.

== History ==
The US 33 designation was established January 1, 1938; it and the Blue and Gray Trail were dedicated on May 2 of that year in multiple ceremonies. At the time, US 33 extended into the state of Michigan near Niles up to a terminus in St. Joseph, following US 31.

In November 1960, US 33 was extended to a junction with I-196/US 31 near Lake Michigan Beach, north of St. Joseph. In 1986, the highway was truncated south of Niles to the junction with US 12. In April 1998, it was truncated again to Elkhart, Indiana. Before its second truncation, it passed through Mishawaka and South Bend. Former segments of US 33 are now known as M-63, M-139, M-51, and State Road 933.

Various segments of US 33 have been improved to limited-access freeways. These include Ohio segments from St. Marys to Wapakoneta; Huntsville (near Bellefontaine) to Dublin (a northwestern suburb of Columbus); and bypasses around Lancaster, Nelsonville, Athens, and Pomeroy.

In West Virginia, US 33 from Interstate 79 near Weston east nearly to Elkins is four-lane, built as part of Corridor H of the Appalachian Development Highway System. The route's steep grade up Shenandoah Mountain in easternmost West Virginia has been widened, with some sharp curves improved.

== Major intersections ==
Indiana
US 20 in Elkhart
US 6 in Ligonier. The highways travel concurrently to northeast of Syracuse.
I-69 / US 30 in Fort Wayne. US 30/US 33 travels concurrently through the city.
I-69 east of Roanoke. The highways travel concurrently to Fort Wayne.
I-469 / US 24 / US 27 south-southeast of Fort Wayne. I-469/US 33 travels concurrently to east of Roanoke. US 24/US 33 travels concurrently around the southwestern side of Fort Wayne.
US 224 in Decatur. The highways travel concurrently through the city.
US 27 in Decatur. The highways travel concurrently to south-southeast of Fort Wayne.
Ohio
US 127 southeast of Rockford
I-75 in Wapakoneta
US 68 in Bellefontaine
US 36 in Marysville. The highways travel concurrently to west of Marysville.
US 42 northeast of New California
I-270 in Dublin
I-670 in Columbus
US 40 / US 62 in Columbus
US 62 in Columbus. The highways travel concurrently through the city.
US 23 in Columbus. The highways travel concurrently through the city.
I-70 in Columbus
I-270 in Columbus
US 22 southwest of Lancaster
US 50 in Athens. The highways travel concurrently to east of Athens.
West Virginia
I-77 in Ripley. The highways travel concurrently to Silverton.
US 19 in Weston. The highways travel concurrently through the city.
I-79 southeast of Weston
US 119 in Buckhannon. The highways travel concurrently to Spencer.
US 219 / US 250 in Elkins. US 33/US 219 travels concurrently to north of Elkins. US 33/US 250 travel concurrently to north of Norton.
US 220 in Franklin. The highways travel concurrently to north of Franklin.

Virginia
US 11 in Harrisonburg. The highways travel concurrently around the Rockingham County Courthouse.
I-81 in Harrisonburg
US 340 in Elkton
US 29 in Ruckersville
US 15 south of Gordonsville. The highways travel concurrently to Gordonsville.
US 522 in Cuckoo. The highways travel concurrently to north-northwest of Cuckoo.
I-295 northwest of Glen Allen
I-64 in Dumbarton
US 250 in Richmond. The highways travel concurrently through the city.
SR 33 in Richmond
