= 270 (disambiguation) =

270 may refer to:

- The year 270
- The year 270 BC
- 270 (number)
- .270 Winchester, a rifle cartridge, or more generally cartridges in the .270 caliber
- 270 Anahita, a main-belt asteroid
- Interstate 270
