= I-270 =

I-270 may refer to:

- Interstate 270 (disambiguation), one of several highways
- Mikoyan-Gurevich I-270, a cancelled Soviet interceptor aircraft
