= Charles Lanham =

Charles Lanham may refer to:

- Charles C. Lanham (1928–2015), American businessman and politician
- Charles T. Lanham (1902–1978), author, poet and soldier
