= Ohio State Route 248 =

State highway in Meigs County, Ohio, US

State Route 248

Route information
- Maintained by ODOT
- Length: 9.15 mi (14.73 km)
- Existed: 1925–present

Major junctions
- West end: SR 7 / CR 25 in Chester
- East end: SR 124 in Long Bottom

Location
- Country: United States
- State: Ohio
- Counties: Meigs

Highway system
- Ohio State Highway System; Interstate; US; State; Scenic
← SR 247	→ SR 249

State Route 248 (SR 248, OH 248) is an east–west state highway in southern Ohio, a U.S. state. State Route 248 extends from its western terminus at State Route 7 in the unincorporated community of Chester to its eastern terminus at a Y-intersection with State Route 124 in Long Bottom.

== Route description ==
All of State Route 248 lies within the eastern portion of Meigs County. State Route 248 is not included as a part of the National Highway System, a system of highways deemed most vital for the economy, mobility and defense of the nation.

== History ==
When it debuted in 1925, State Route 248 was a spur route off of State Route 7 that served the community of Reedsville. This original routing consisted of the entirety of the current State Route 248, along with the portion of the current State Route 124 running from the State Route 248 junction northeast to Reedsville. In 1934, State Route 124 was extended north from Portland. In the process, took over what was the portion of State Route 248 from their current junction northeast to Reedsville, and then points north. Consequently, State Route 248 became a connector route, and took on the form that it has today.

== Major intersections ==
The entire route is in Meigs County.

Location	mi	km	Destinations	Notes
Chester Township	0.00	0.00	SR 7 / CR 25 (Pomeroy Pike) – Pomeroy, Marietta	
Olive Township	9.15	14.73	SR 124 – Reedsville, Hockingport, Racine, Ravenswood	
1.000 mi = 1.609 km; 1.000 km = 0.621 mi
