= Ripley High School (West Virginia) =

Public school in Ripley, West Virginia, US

Location
- 2 School Street; Ripley, Jackson County, WV 25271; United States; 38°48′43″N 81°42′4″W

Information
- Type: Public
- Motto: "Truth, Honor, Loyalty"
- Established: 1913
- School district: Jackson County Schools
- Principal: Jeffrey Banton
- Teaching staff: 53.15 (FTE)
- Grades: 9-12
- Enrollment: 788 (2023-2024)
- Student to teacher ratio: 14.83
- Colors: Blue and white
- Mascot: Vikings
- Website: rhs.jack.k12.wv.us/o/rihs

Ripley High School is a public school in Ripley, West Virginia, serving the town of Ripley and the immediate surrounding areas in Jackson County, West Virginia. The school receives feeder students from Ripley Middle School.

== History ==
In the summer of 1913, Ripley High School was established, and in the following school year, 23 students were enrolled. In order to uphold its legal right to exist as an educational institution, it had to combine with the grade school in the following year due to an extremely low number of students. In 1917, better efforts were made to build the school, and additional rooms were made accordingly. In 1918, however, during the Spanish flu pandemic, health authorities closed the school until January 1, 1919. Later in 1919, voters approved funds for the construction of a new building, which was completed in 1922. Classes were held in the 1922 building until the present building was constructed in 1950, and it has steadily increased since then with additional buildings. The Main Building of the school received a multimillion-dollar renovation in 2002 and, in 2008, construction began on a chemistry lab addition, which was finished in 2009. The football field, known as Memorial Stadium, received new astroturf in 2004 and this was replaced in 2018.

== Notable alumni ==
- Charles C. Lanham, West Virginia State Senator and businessman
- Bill Karr, American football player

== Notable faculty ==
- Virginia Starcher, member of the West Virginia House of Delegates
