= Old Meigs County Courthouse =

- Old Meigs County Courthouse And Chester Academy
- U.S. National Register of Historic Places
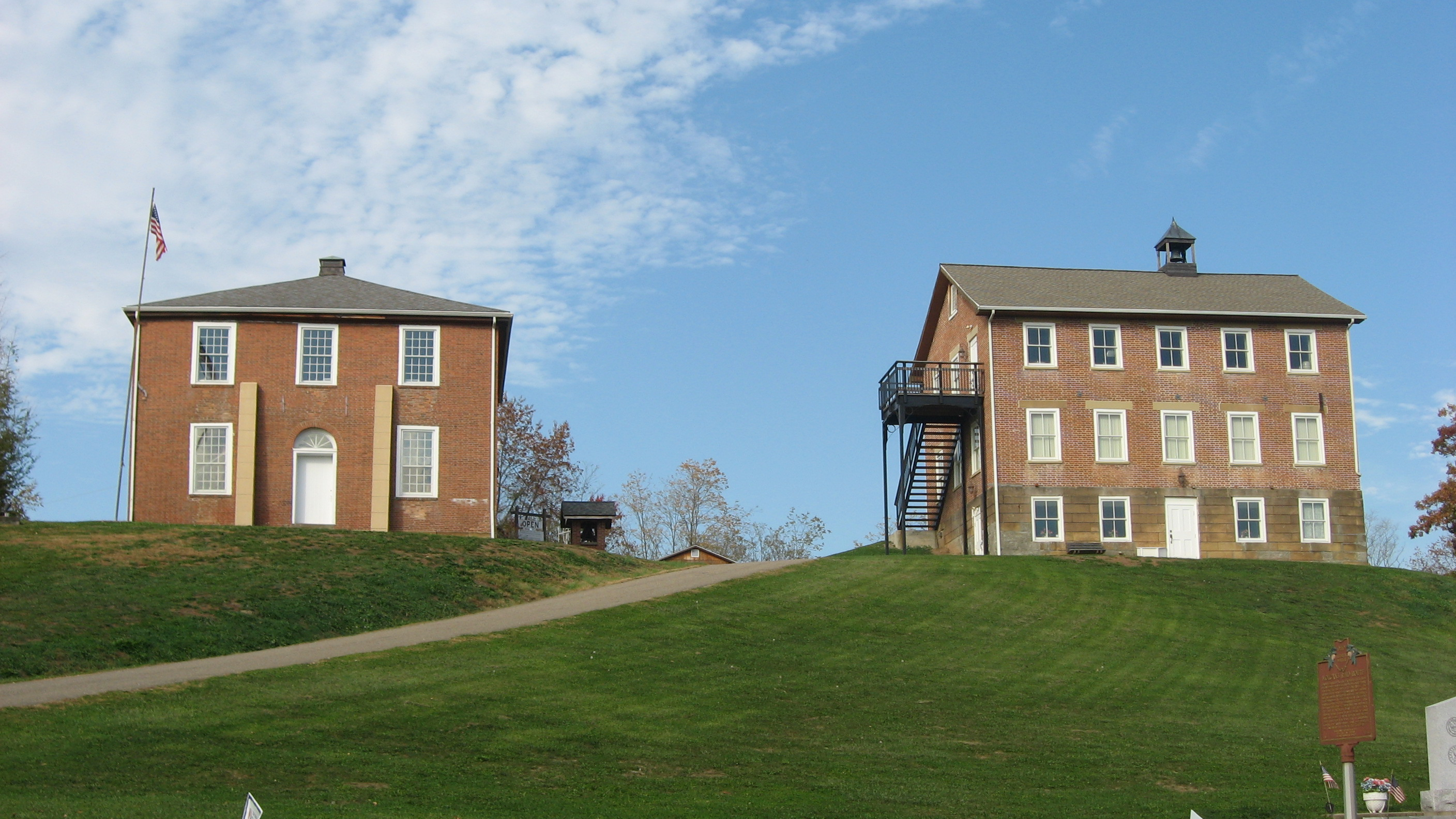
- Overview from the south

- Location within Ohio Location within the United States
- Interactive map of Old Meigs County Courthouse And Chester Academy
- Location: State Route 248, Chester, Ohio
- Coordinates: 39°5′18″N 81°55′19″W
- Area: 4 acres (1.6 ha)
- Built: 1823
- Architectural style: Federal
- NRHP reference No.: 75001488
- Added to NRHP: June 30, 1975

The Old Meigs County Courthouse is a historic former government building in the small community of Chester, Ohio, United States. Erected in the early nineteenth century, the courthouse served multiple purposes for the surrounding community in its early years, but it operated as a courthouse for less than twenty years before being abandoned in favor of another courthouse in another community. Following a restoration in the 1950s, it was designated a historic site in the 1970s along with an adjacent school; the two buildings are operated together as a museum. It is Ohio's oldest extant building constructed as a courthouse.

== Community history ==
In 1819, the Ohio General Assembly created Meigs County from part of Gallia County. The courts initially met in a building in Salisbury Township, but after fire destroyed their first meeting place in 1821, the county commissioners readily accepted a Chester Township resident's offer to meet in his house. Before long, the homeowner decided to plat a town, which was to be named "Chester"; Chester was named the county seat in 1822, and a courthouse and jail were built. Throughout the rest of the 1820s, Chester flourished; both professionals and farmers settled there, and the Shade River was busy with cargo travelling between Chester and New Orleans. However, the 1830s saw the development of steamboats stopping at Pomeroy to load the area's rich coal mines, and Chester's two hundred residents suffered greatly from a plague of cholera in 1834. Ultimately, the county government moved to the current courthouse in Pomeroy in 1841; the old courthouse was abandoned, and Chester languished.

== Construction ==
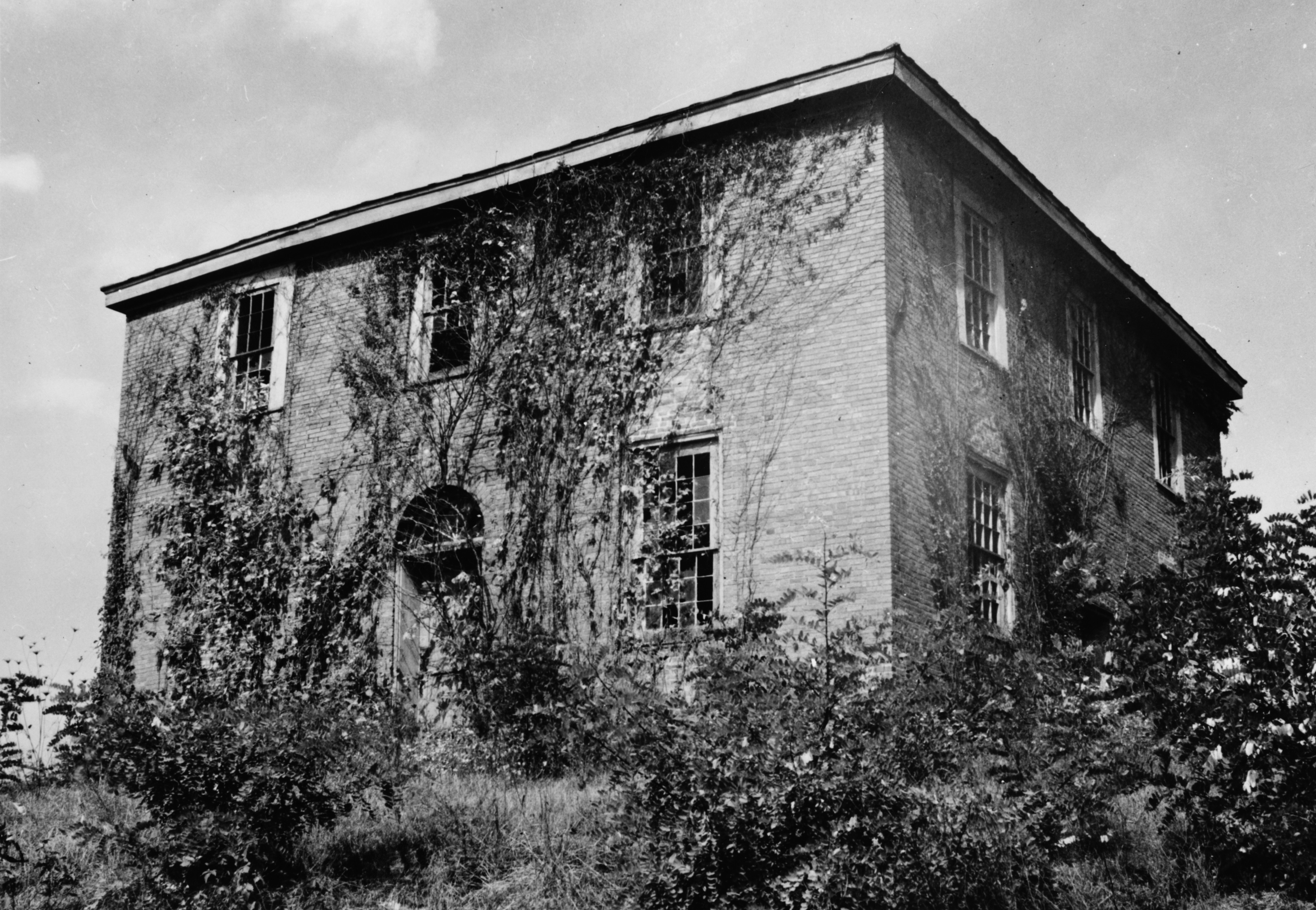
The courthouse in 1951

Meeting at the home of the hospitable Chester Township resident in late September 1822, the county commissioners voted to build a log jail and jailer's house and to begin planning for a permanent courthouse. Two weeks later, they voted in favor of constructing a two-story brick building measuring 36 by 38 feet (11 m × 12 m) and 16 feet (4.9 m) tall with seven windows. Late in the month, they ordered that the height be increased to 18 feet (5.5 m), and yet another meeting resulted in a decision to place a cupola on top of the courthouse. By December of the following year, the building was complete; fourteen men were paid a total of $1,255.20 for construction.

The completed courthouse is a brick building in the Federal style with a stone foundation; by the 1970s, its original roof had been replaced with metal. Its bricks were manufactured locally in the then-typical size of 4 by 8 inches (10 cm × 20 cm).

== School ==
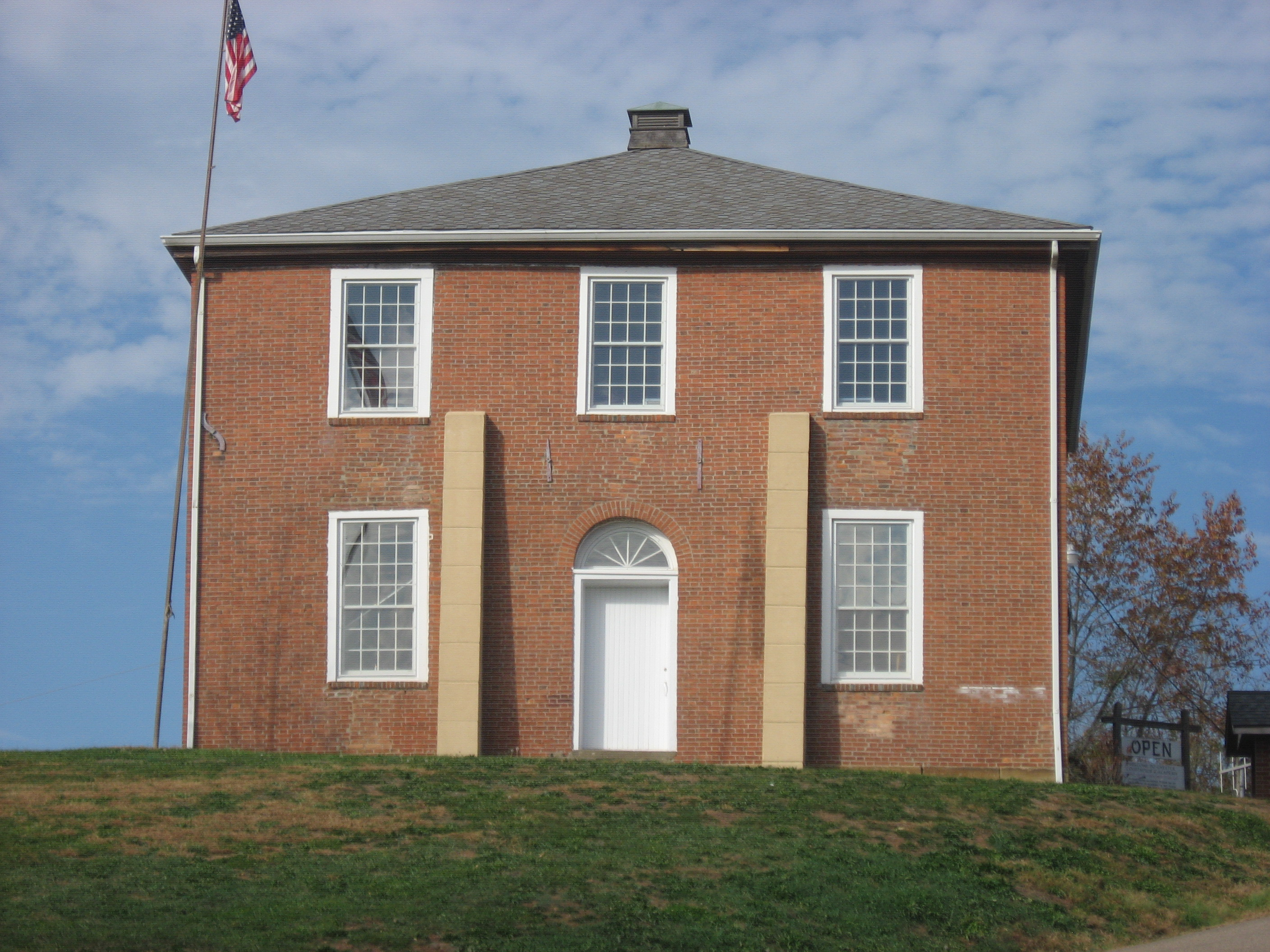
The courthouse in 2012

Chester's first school was established in 1830, largely under the influence of a Scottish scholar, Samuel Halliday, who settled in Chester Township and embarked on teaching the local children. The present three-story building was erected in 1839 with the goal of serving students from all over Meigs County. In its early years, the brick school building was used for all sorts of community events: the township trustees rented it as a voting place, social groups such as debate societies and singing schools held their meetings in it, and the complete absence of church buildings in the township prompted all of the township's churches to worship in it. The building remained in use for scholastic purposes until the Civil War, after which the school closed and its building was converted into storage for the adjacent courthouse.

== Later history ==
The courthouse in Chester remained in use as the county courthouse until Pomeroy was made the county seat; it later was converted into a meeting place for a local Grange hall. By 1951, it sat empty and unused, but two years later the Meigs County Pioneer and Historical Society undertook a project to restore the building. In 1975, the courthouse and school were listed together on the National Register of Historic Places, qualifying both because of their architecture and the place that they had played in Ohio's history. The two buildings are presently operated as a museum by the Chester-Shade Historical Association. The courthouse is Ohio's oldest extant building that was constructed as a courthouse, and one of two surviving first-generation Federal courthouses in the state, along with the Old Perry County Courthouse in Somerset.
