= Virginia Starcher =

American politician

Member of the West Virginia House of Delegates from the 11th district
- In office 1987–1991
- Preceded by: Bill Carmichael

Personal details
- Born: Virginia Rae Jolliffe; February 23, 1930 Wheeling, West Virginia
- Died: December 19, 2012 (aged 82) Hubbard Hospice House, Charleston, West Virginia
- Party: Democrat
- Spouse: Harold Starcher
- Children: Mark and Ann
- Parent(s): Roy and Ella Jolliffe
- Education: West Virginia University

Virginia Rae "Ginny" Starcher (February 23, 1930 – December 19, 2012) was an American politician and schoolteacher from West Virginia, who represented Jackson County and part of Mason County from 1987–1991.

== Early life, education and teaching career ==
She was born in Wheeling, West Virginia to Roy and Ella Jolliffe (née Lowe). She attended schools in Cameron, West Virginia before graduating from West Virginia University. She taught at her alma mater, and two secondary schools, Ripley High School in Ripley, West Virginia and Schenectady High School in New York.

== Political career ==
Starcher's early work with the federal government included stints at the Central Intelligence Agency and Library of Congress. She later served as Jackson County commissioner. A Democrat, Starcher ran for her first state-level election in 1984, but lost to Bill Carmichael. She won the 1986 election, becoming the first woman elected to the West Virginia House of Delegates from her district. Starcher won reelection in 1988, and retired at the conclusion of her second term.

== Death ==
In October 2012, she and her husband Harold Starcher ate at a Bob Evans restaurant in Ripley, where both allegedly suffered food poisoning. Both spent their final months in hospitals and hospice care. Virginia Starcher died at the Hubbard Hospice House in Charleston, West Virginia on December 19, 2012, and Harold died on May 6, 2013. Their children, Mark and Ann, filed a lawsuit against Bob Evans and asking for $250,000 in damages.
