= Meigs County Courthouse (Ohio) =

Local government building in the United States

- U.S. Historic district – Contributing property
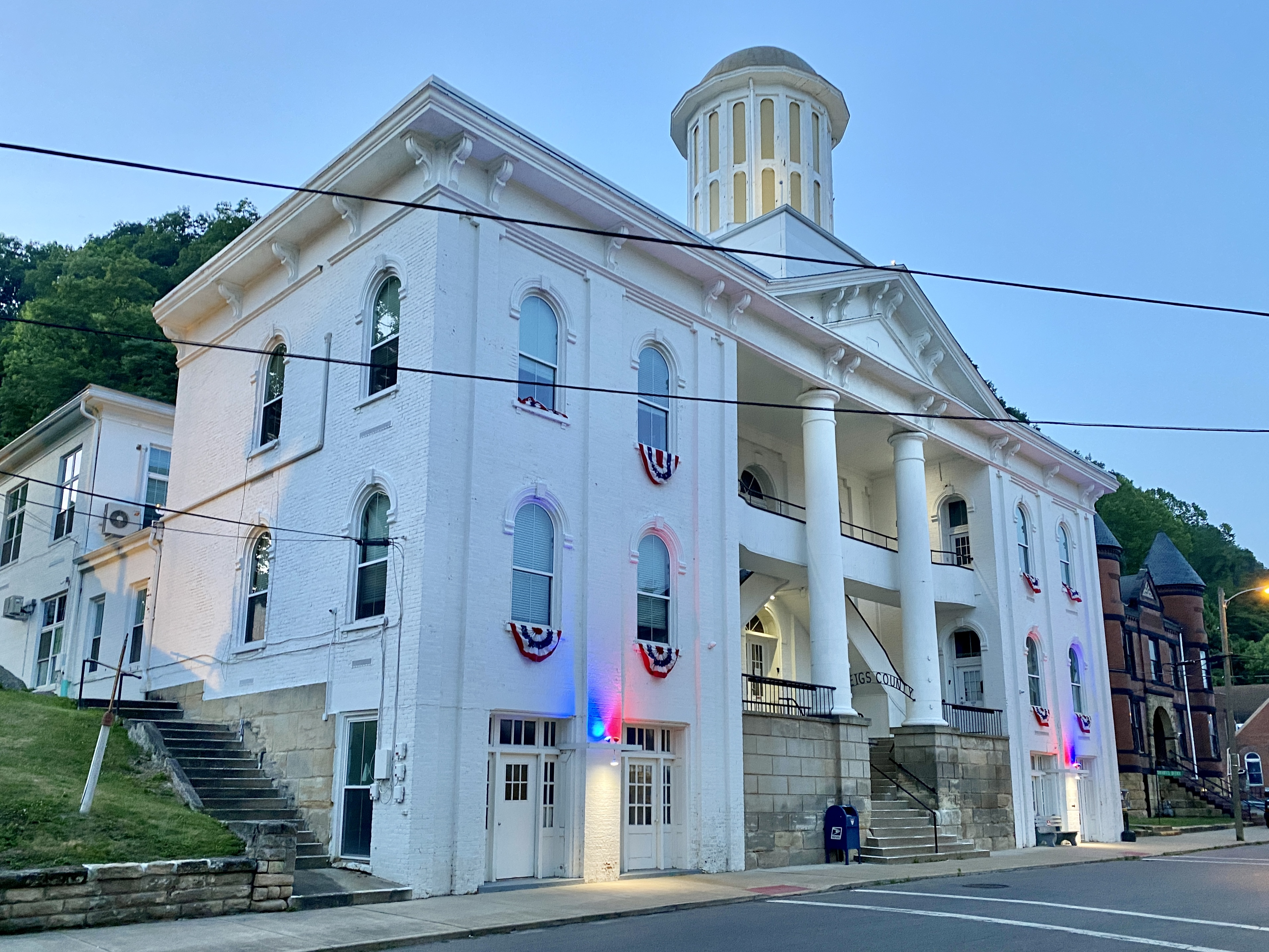
- Front and western side

- Location within Ohio Location within the United States
- Interactive map showing the location of Meigs County Courthouse
- Location: 2nd and Court Sts., Pomeroy, Ohio
- Coordinates: 39°1′40″N 82°2′2″W
- Built: 1848
- Architectural style: Greek Revival
- Part of: Pomeroy Historic District (ID78003551)
- Added to NRHP: November 14, 1978

The Meigs County Courthouse is a local government building in Pomeroy, Ohio, United States. Built in the 1840s in this Ohio River village, it serves as the seat of government for Meigs County, and it is one of Ohio's oldest courthouses still used for its original purpose.

== Historic context ==
In 1819, Meigs County was separated from Gallia County, and a courthouse and jail were soon built in the community of Chester. This building, known as the Old Meigs County Courthouse, remains in existence; it is the oldest standing courthouse in Ohio. Within twenty years, Chester was in decline and the new riverside village of Pomeroy was growing in prominence; the resulting change of county seat status from Chester to Pomeroy, accomplished in 1841, was later deemed the "one great event" in the county's history. In 1845, the Meigs County Commissioners arranged for the construction of a new courthouse in Pomeroy, contracting with S.S. Bergin to be the architect; construction was overseen by County Commissioner John C. Hysell, and the building was completed in 1848. Fifteen years later, the courthouse was used as a temporary jail for more than two hundred of Morgan's Raiders who had been captured in the Battle of Buffington Island in Meigs County.

== Architecture ==
Meigs County paid $5,215 to build the courthouse — $15 to buy the blueprints for the Scioto County Courthouse, and $5,200 for construction of a building virtually identical to the one in Scioto County. The three-story courthouse is a Greek Revival structure featuring elements such as a pedimented entrance with Doric columns, decorative pilasters, a bracketed cornice, and a circular central tower with a dome and windowed cupola. It is primarily built of brick, although carven stone trim frames the arched windows. Because downtown Pomeroy lies on a narrow strip of land between the Ohio River and steep cliffs, the courthouse was built against the cliffs. By 1877, insufficient interior space forced the construction of wings along the hillside to house additional offices, along with spiral staircases, the columns, and the Italianate-influenced cornice on the tower. In order to permit fuller use of the existing portions of the building, workers excavated the street to the same level as the basement. Existing hilly land around the wings permitted the construction of at-grade entrances to all three floors of the courthouse.

== Recent history ==
Due in part to Pomeroy's economic stagnation in the twentieth century, new construction in the downtown has been virtually nonexistent for several decades; consequently, the business district is almost identical to its nineteenth-century appearance. One of the more recent construction projects around the courthouse involved the placement of a Civil War memorial statue on the courthouse lawn in 1870; it bears more than five hundred names of the county's war dead. Most of the other downtown buildings are Italianate structures from the second half of the century, making the courthouse's earlier architecture stand out from its surroundings; observers across the Ohio River in Mason, West Virginia can easily see the courthouse as it sits at the northern end of Court Street. Because of its unusually good degree of preservation, much of the downtown was declared a historic district and listed on the National Register of Historic Places in 1978. Known as the Pomeroy Historic District, this portion of the downtown centers on the courthouse.

The Meigs County Courthouse remains in use by governmental bodies, such as the common pleas court and lesser courts. It is one of the state's oldest courthouses still used as a courthouse.
