= Charles C. Lanham =

American politician

Member of the West Virginia Senate from the 4th district
- In office 2004–2006
- Preceded by: Lisa Smith
- Succeeded by: Mike Hall

Personal details
- Born: September 12, 1928 Ripley, West Virginia, U.S.
- Died: December 15, 2015 (aged 87) Point Pleasant, West Virginia, U.S.
- Party: Republican
- Committees: Banking and Insurance, Economic Development, Government Organization, the Judiciary and Labor and Pensions

Charles C. Lanham (September 12, 1928 – December 15, 2015) was an American businessman and politician.

Born in Ripley, West Virginia, Lanham graduated from Ripley High School in 1946. He then served in the United States Army. In 1952, Lanham graduated from Marshall University. Lanham worked in the bank business in Ripley, West Virginia and then in Point Pleasant, West Virginia. Lanham, a Republican, was appointed to the West Virginia Senate's 4th district in 2004 by then-Governor Bob Wise to fill the vacancy left by Lisa Smith, who stepped down for health reasons. He declined to run in 2006 when his term expired. While in office, Lanham served on several committees, including Banking and Insurance, Economic Development, Government Organization, the Judiciary and Labor and Pensions. He died at Point Pleasant, West Virginia.
