= Ravenswood Bridge =

American bridge crossing the Ohio River

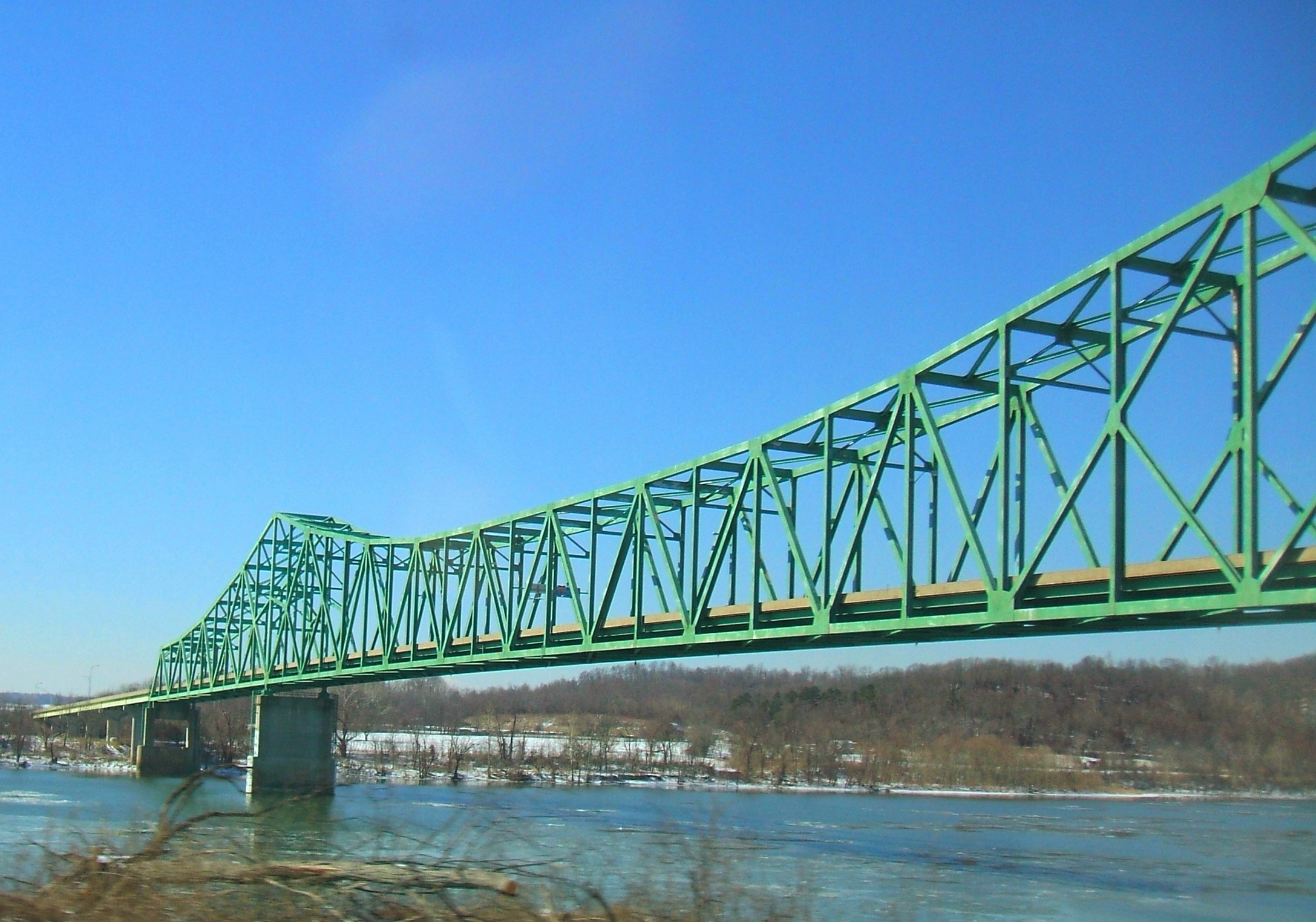
- View of the bridge from Ravenswood
- Coordinates: 38°56′N 81°46′W
- Carries: US 33
- Crosses: Ohio River
- Official name: William S. Ritchie, Jr. Bridge
- Maintained by: West Virginia Department of Transportation

Characteristics
- Design: Cantilever bridge
- Total length: 2,710 feet (830 m)
- Longest span: 900 feet (270 m)

History
- Opened: 1981

Location
- Interactive map of Ravenswood Bridge

State Route 824
- Location: Meigs County
- Existed: 1981–2003

- Location: Ravenswood
- Existed: 1981–2003

The William S. Ritchie Jr. Bridge, more commonly known as the Ravenswood Bridge, is a two-lane cantilever bridge in the United States, connecting Ravenswood, West Virginia and rural Meigs County, Ohio, across the Ohio River. It has a total length of 2,710 ft (830 m) with a main span of 900 ft (270 m). The bridge was completed in 1981.

The bridge replaced a ferry that had crossed the river between Ravenswood at Water Street and rural Lebanon Township since at least 1908. When the bridge opened in 1981, on the Ohio side of the river, the bridge and its approach route carried the 0.57-mile-long (0.92 km) Ohio State Route 824 (SR 824). The crossing originally led to a winding two-lane SR 338. On the West Virginia side, the bridge carried West Virginia Route 338. In 2003, the SR 824 and WV 338 designations were removed when the US 33 relocation in Meigs County was completed and the US 33 designation was moved onto the bridge.

Additionally, the Ohio Department of Transportation (ODOT) is currently holding a feasibility study on the bridge, where they plan to replace the bridge with a four lane one. According to the ODOT website, this bridge is included in ODOT's series of projects on the U.S. 33 corridor between Columbus and the Ohio River to improve safety and efficiency. There are three possible alternatives, two of which involve removing the existing bridge, and building a new four lane one beside it, and one involves building a new two lane bridge, and leaving the existing bridge. The project files can be found here.

Browse numbered routes
← SR 823	OH	→ SR 833
← WV 331	WV	→ US 340

== See also ==
- List of crossings of the Ohio River
