= Jackson County Schools (West Virginia) =

School district in West Virginia, United States

Location
- Jackson County, West Virginia

District information
- Type: Public
- Superintendent: William Hosaflook
- NCES District ID: 5400540

Other information
- Website: www.boe.jack.k12.wv.us

Jackson County Schools is the operating school district within Jackson County, West Virginia.

== Schools ==
The following schools are in Jackson County Schools:

=== High Schools ===
- Ravenswood High School
- Ripley High School
- Roane-Jackson Technical Center

=== Middle Schools ===
- Ravenswood Middle School
- Ripley Middle School

=== Elementary Schools ===
- Cottageville Elementary School
- Evans Elementary School
- Fairplain Elementary School
- Gilmore Elementary School
- Henry J Kaiser Elementary School
- Kenna Elementary School
- Ravenswood Grade School
- Ripley Elementary School
