= Ripley, West Virginia =

City in West Virginia, US

- City
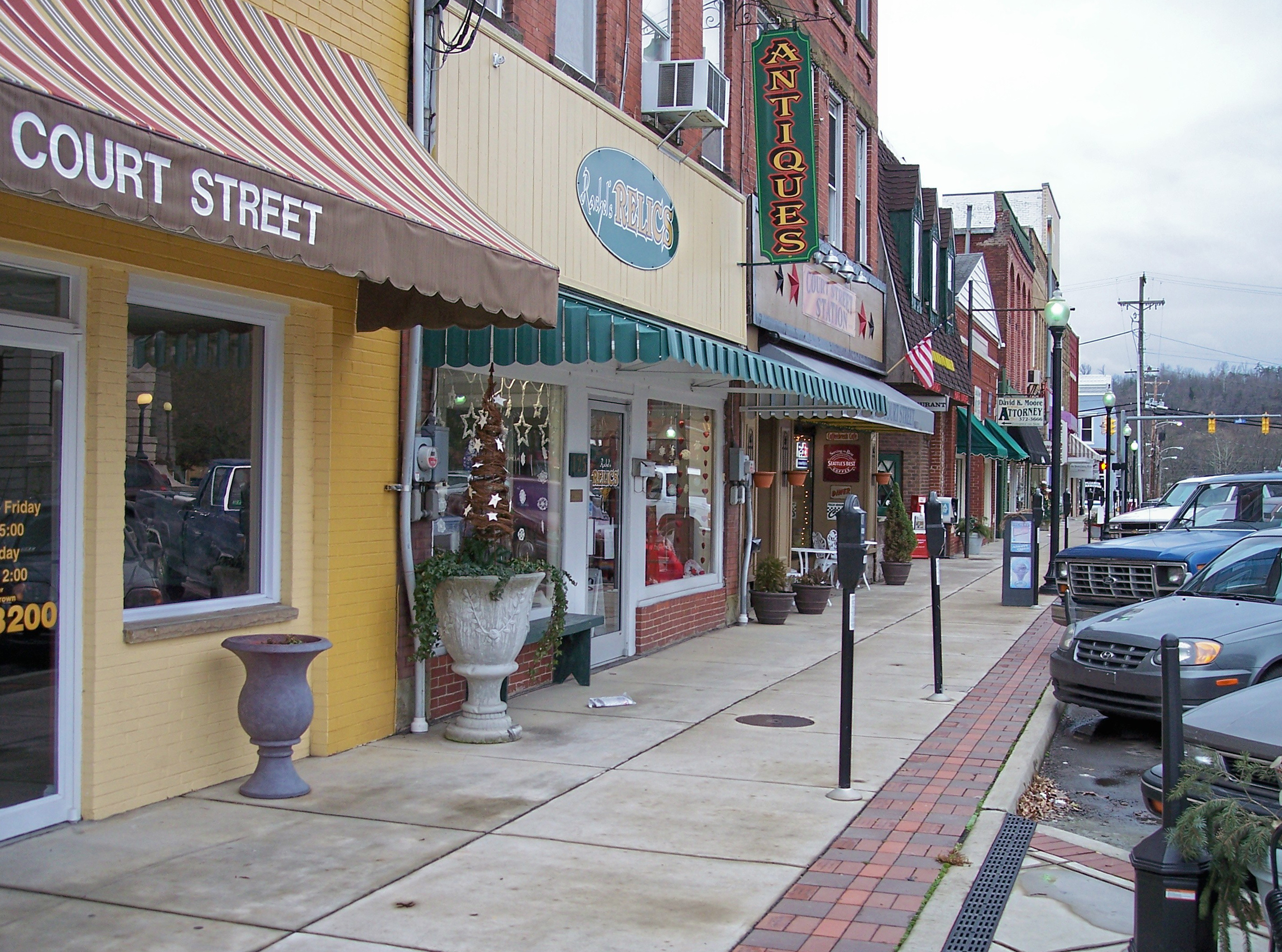
- North Court Street in downtown Ripley in 2007

- Flag
- Interactive map of Ripley, West Virginia
- Location within West Virginia Location within the United States
- Coordinates: 38°49′16″N 81°42′51″W
- Country: United States
- State: West Virginia
- County: Jackson

Government
  - Type: City Council/Mayor
  - Mayor: Carolyn L. Rader

Area
  - Total: 3.29 sq mi (8.51 km^{2})
  - Land: 3.18 sq mi (8.23 km^{2})
  - Water: 0.11 sq mi (0.28 km^{2})
- Elevation: 614 ft (187 m)

Population (2020)
  - Total: 3,079
  - Estimate (2021): 3,064
  - Density: 994.5/sq mi (383.96/km^{2})
- Time zone: UTC-5 (Eastern (EST))
  - Summer (DST): UTC-4 (EDT)
- ZIP code: 25271
- Area code: 304
- FIPS code: 54-68596
- GNIS feature ID: 1545757
- Website: Official website

Ripley is a city in and the county seat of Jackson County, West Virginia, United States. The population was 3,074 at the 2020 census.

== History ==
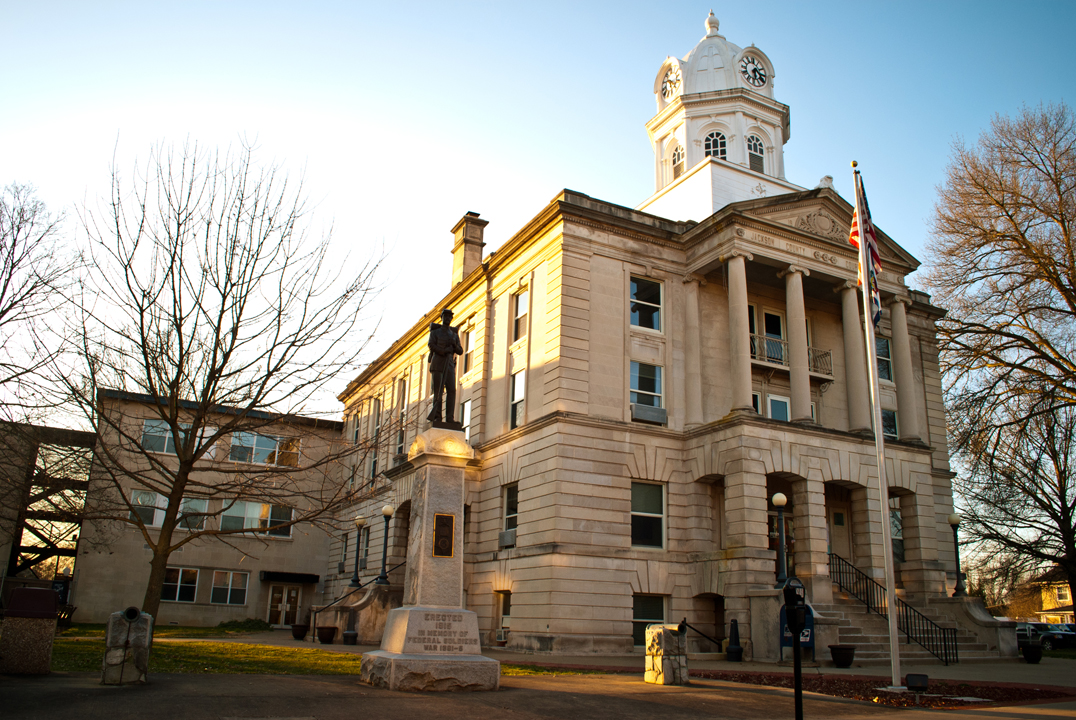
Jackson County Courthouse in 2012

Ripley was originally owned and settled by William, John, and Lewis Rodgers. They received a grant of 400 acres (1.6 km^{2}) in 1768 where "Sycamore Creek joins Big Mill Creek" (the current site of Ripley). The land was later sold to Jacob (and Ann) Starcher, most probably in 1803. Jacob Starcher erected a grist mill in 1824 and laid out the town in 1830, naming it in honor of Harry Ripley, a young minister who was to be married, but drowned in Big Mill Creek, about one and a half miles north of the town, shortly before the ceremony took place.

When Jackson County was formed in 1831, the residents of the county could not decide where to locate the county seat. The people who lived along the Ohio River near the Ravenswood settlement favored that location. The people who lived farther inland objected. The Virginia General Assembly appointed an independent commission to make the final decision which selected Ripley. In 1832, the Starchers donated 8 acres (32,000 m^{2}) of land to the county, 2 acres (8,100 m^{2}) for the location of the county courthouse and jail, and six for the general use of the new county (a public school and a cemetery were later located on the land). The town was chartered by the Virginia General Assembly in 1832.

The post office was established in 1832 with the name Jackson Court House. The name was shortened in 1893 to Jackson. In 1897, the name became Ripley.

During the American Civil War, Ripley remained under the control of the Union except for a brief incursion by the Confederate General Albert G. Jenkins in September 1862.

The last public hanging in West Virginia took place in Ripley in 1897, when John Morgan was hanged for murder. The spectacle prompted the West Virginia Legislature to ban public executions soon after.

== Geography ==
Ripley is located at 38°49′16″N 81°42′51″W (38.821078, -81.714264), along Mill Creek.

According to the United States Census Bureau, the city has a total area of 3.28 square miles (8.50 km^{2}), of which 3.17 square miles (8.21 km^{2}) is land and 0.11 square miles (0.28 km^{2}) is water.

=== Climate ===
Climate data for Ripley, West Virginia (1991–2020 normals, extremes 1941–present)
Month	Jan	Feb	Mar	Apr	May	Jun	Jul	Aug	Sep	Oct	Nov	Dec	Year
Record high °F (°C)	80 (27)	81 (27)	89 (32)	95 (35)	97 (36)	102 (39)	107 (42)	103 (39)	102 (39)	95 (35)	86 (30)	82 (28)	107 (42)
Mean maximum °F (°C)	66.9 (19.4)	70.0 (21.1)	77.8 (25.4)	85.4 (29.7)	88.8 (31.6)	91.6 (33.1)	94.0 (34.4)	92.9 (33.8)	91.0 (32.8)	83.9 (28.8)	76.7 (24.8)	67.8 (19.9)	94.9 (34.9)
Mean daily maximum °F (°C)	43.7 (6.5)	47.8 (8.8)	57.1 (13.9)	69.8 (21.0)	77.8 (25.4)	84.7 (29.3)	88.3 (31.3)	87.2 (30.7)	81.6 (27.6)	70.2 (21.2)	58.1 (14.5)	47.8 (8.8)	67.8 (19.9)
Daily mean °F (°C)	32.8 (0.4)	35.8 (2.1)	43.7 (6.5)	54.7 (12.6)	63.9 (17.7)	71.7 (22.1)	75.8 (24.3)	74.3 (23.5)	68.1 (20.1)	56.1 (13.4)	45.1 (7.3)	37.2 (2.9)	54.9 (12.7)
Mean daily minimum °F (°C)	21.8 (−5.7)	23.8 (−4.6)	30.3 (−0.9)	39.6 (4.2)	50.0 (10.0)	58.7 (14.8)	63.3 (17.4)	61.5 (16.4)	54.5 (12.5)	42.0 (5.6)	32.1 (0.1)	26.5 (−3.1)	42.0 (5.6)
Mean minimum °F (°C)	2.9 (−16.2)	6.7 (−14.1)	15.1 (−9.4)	26.0 (−3.3)	35.4 (1.9)	47.4 (8.6)	54.7 (12.6)	52.6 (11.4)	42.7 (5.9)	29.5 (−1.4)	18.9 (−7.3)	11.8 (−11.2)	−0.7 (−18.2)
Record low °F (°C)	−28 (−33)	−17 (−27)	−11 (−24)	11 (−12)	23 (−5)	35 (2)	39 (4)	35 (2)	27 (−3)	14 (−10)	0 (−18)	−17 (−27)	−28 (−33)
Average precipitation inches (mm)	3.14 (80)	3.26 (83)	4.23 (107)	3.77 (96)	4.44 (113)	4.95 (126)	4.88 (124)	3.85 (98)	3.75 (95)	3.12 (79)	2.99 (76)	3.66 (93)	46.04 (1,169)
Average snowfall inches (cm)	6.3 (16)	1.4 (3.6)	1.4 (3.6)	0.0 (0.0)	0.0 (0.0)	0.0 (0.0)	0.0 (0.0)	0.0 (0.0)	0.0 (0.0)	0.0 (0.0)	0.2 (0.51)	2.3 (5.8)	11.6 (29)
Average precipitation days (≥ 0.01 in)	12.9	11.7	13.4	13.0	13.3	12.0	11.3	10.2	8.7	9.3	10.3	13.3	139.4
Average snowy days (≥ 0.1 in)	2.7	1.7	0.7	0.0	0.0	0.0	0.0	0.0	0.0	0.0	0.1	1.6	6.8
Source: NOAA

== Demographics ==
Historical population
Census	Pop.	Note	%±
1870	226		—
1880	425		88.1%
1890	417		−1.9%
1900	579		38.8%
1910	591		2.1%
1920	580		−1.9%
1930	669		15.3%
1940	759		13.5%
1950	1,813		138.9%
1960	2,756		52.0%
1970	3,244		17.7%
1980	3,464		6.8%
1990	3,023		−12.7%
2000	3,263		7.9%
2010	3,252		−0.3%
2020	3,079		−5.3%
2021 (est.)	3,064		−0.5%
U.S. Decennial Census

=== 2020 census ===
As of the 2020 census, Ripley had a population of 3,079. The median age was 44.7 years. 19.6% of residents were under the age of 18 and 24.1% of residents were 65 years of age or older. For every 100 females there were 85.5 males, and for every 100 females age 18 and over there were 82.3 males age 18 and over.

0.0% of residents lived in urban areas, while 100.0% lived in rural areas.

There were 1,384 households in Ripley, of which 24.9% had children under the age of 18 living in them. Of all households, 37.6% were married-couple households, 18.9% were households with a male householder and no spouse or partner present, and 36.3% were households with a female householder and no spouse or partner present. About 38.5% of all households were made up of individuals and 18.7% had someone living alone who was 65 years of age or older.

There were 1,562 housing units, of which 11.4% were vacant. The homeowner vacancy rate was 3.0% and the rental vacancy rate was 10.7%.

Racial composition as of the 2020 census
Race	Number	Percent
White	2,943	95.6%
Black or African American	10	0.3%
American Indian and Alaska Native	4	0.1%
Asian	22	0.7%
Native Hawaiian and Other Pacific Islander	0	0.0%
Some other race	22	0.7%
Two or more races	78	2.5%
Hispanic or Latino (of any race)	24	0.8%

=== 2010 census ===
At the 2010 census, there were 3,252 people, 1,476 households and 854 families living in the city. The population density was 1,025.9 per square mile (396.1/km^{2}). There were 1,614 housing units at an average density of 509.1 per square mile (196.6/km^{2}). The racial makeup of the city was 98.2% White, 0.2% African American, 0.4% Asian, 0.3% from other races, and 0.9% from two or more races. Hispanic or Latino of any race were 0.5% of the population.

There were 1,476 households, of which 24.7% had children under the age of 18 living with them, 42.8% were married couples living together, 11.8% had a female householder with no husband present, 3.3% had a male householder with no wife present, and 42.1% were non-families. 39.2% of all households were made up of individuals, and 19.2% had someone living alone who was 65 years of age or older. The average household size was 2.12 and the average family size was 2.81.

The median age was 46.1 years. 19.7% of residents were under the age of 18; 7.4% were between the ages of 18 and 24; 21.7% were from 25 to 44; 26.2% were from 45 to 64; and 25% were 65 years of age or older. The gender makeup of the city was 44.6% male and 55.4% female.

=== 2000 census ===
At the 2000 census, there were 3,263 people, 1,423 households and 893 families living in the city. The population density was 1,056.3 per square mile (407.7/km^{2}). There were 1,543 housing units at an average density of 499.5 per square mile (192.8/km^{2}). The racial makeup of the city was 98.22% White, 0.06% African American, 0.06% Native American, 0.21% Asian, 0.37% from other races, and 1.07% from two or more races. Hispanic or Latino of any race were 0.64% of the population.

There were 1,423 households, of which 23.9% had children under the age of 18 living with them, 49.5% were married couples living together, 11.1% had a female householder with no husband present, and 37.2% were non-families. 34.4% of all households were made up of individuals, and 18.3% had someone living alone who was 65 years of age or older. The average household size was 2.17 and the average family size was 2.78.

19.2% of the population were under the age of 18, 8.3% from 18 to 24, 22.6% from 25 to 44, 24.0% from 45 to 64, and 25.8% who were 65 years of age or older. The median age was 45 years. For every 100 females, there were 79.8 males. For every 100 females age 18 and over, there were 73.4 males.

The median household income was $25,861 and the median income for a family was $37,027. Males had a median income of $29,531 and females $20,881. The per capita income was $15,451. About 12.1% of families and 16.4% of the population were below the poverty line, including 21.5% of those under age 18 and 9.9% of those age 65 or over.

== Culture ==
Ripley claims to host the "Biggest Small Town Fourth of July Celebration" in the United States. On 4 July 2002, then President George W. Bush gave a public speech at the town's courthouse.

== Education ==
Ripley is served by the Jackson County Schools. Schools located in Ripley are:

- Ripley High School (grades 9 through 12)
- Ripley Middle School (grades 6 through 8)
- Ripley Elementary School (grades PreK through 5)
- Fairplain Elementary School (grades PreK through 5)
- Jackson County Center of West Virginia University at Parkersburg
- Ripley Christian Academy (grades K through 12)

== Media ==
=== Radio ===
- WVRP (90.7 FM)-- Public Radio
- WCEF (98.3 FM)-- Country

== Notable people ==
- Dee Caperton Kessel, First Lady of West Virginia, member of the West Virginia House of Delegates from the 23rd district and Miss West Virginia 1964
- Kane Davis, Major League Baseball pitcher
- Bill Karr, led the NFL twice in receiving touchdowns and was selected to the 1935 All-Pro Team.
- Charles C. Lanham, member of the West Virginia Senate from the 4th district
- Warren Miller, U.S. Representative from West Virginia’s 4th district
