= Interstate 270 =

Interstate 270 is the designation for four Interstate Highways in the United States, all of which are related to Interstate 70:

- Interstate 270 (Colorado), a northeastern bypass of downtown Denver
- Interstate 270 (Missouri–Illinois), a partial beltway around St. Louis
- Interstate 270 (Maryland), a connector to the Washington, D.C. metropolitan area
- Interstate 270 (Ohio), a beltway around Columbus, Ohio
