= Ravenswood, West Virginia =

City in West Virginia, US

- City
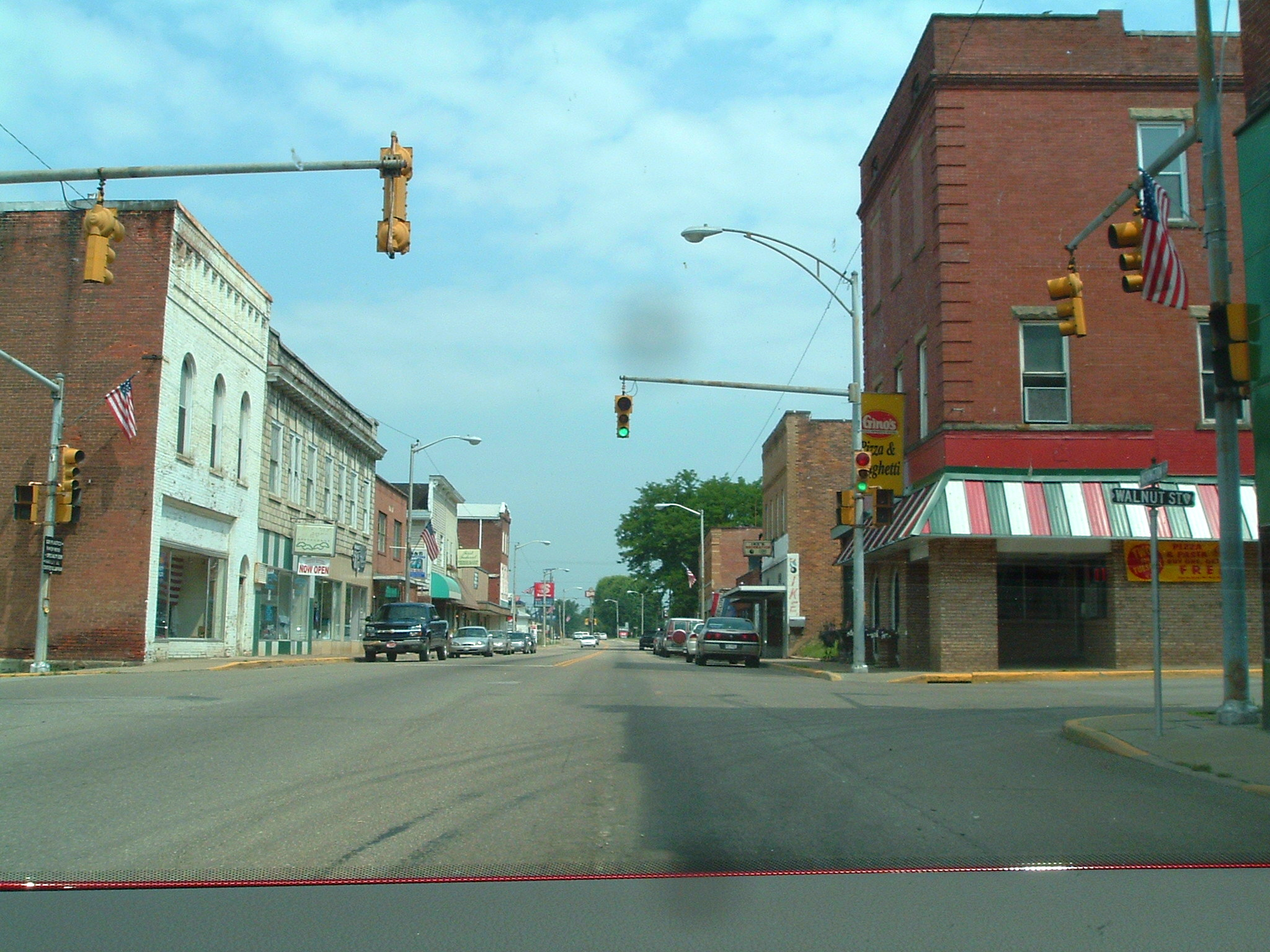
- Intersection of Washington and Walnut Streets

- Seal

- Location of Ravenswood in Jackson County, West Virginia.
- Coordinates: 38°57′11″N 81°45′41″W
- Country: United States
- State: West Virginia
- County: Jackson

Government
  - Mayor: Joshua Miller

Area
  - Total: 1.89 sq mi (4.89 km^{2})
  - Land: 1.82 sq mi (4.71 km^{2})
  - Water: 0.069 sq mi (0.18 km^{2})
- Elevation: 607 ft (185 m)

Population (2020)
  - Total: 3,865
  - Estimate (2021): 3,847
  - Density: 2,000/sq mi (774/km^{2})
- Time zone: UTC-5 (Eastern (EST))
  - Summer (DST): UTC-4 (EDT)
- ZIP code: 26164
- Area code: 304
- FIPS code: 54-67108
- GNIS feature ID: 1555445
- Website: cityofravenswood.com, www.facebook.com/cityofravenswood

Ravenswood is a city in Jackson County, West Virginia, United States, along the Ohio River. The population was 3,865 at the 2020 census.

== Etymology ==
Two differing stories tell of the naming of Ravenswood. One story tells that the town was originally named Ravensworth, after the English relatives of a founding family. But somewhere between the Ohio River wilderness and the mapmaker in Richmond, the name was changed to Ravenswood. The second story says that Henrietta Fitzhugh, wife of one of the town founders, Henry Fitzhugh, named the town after the hero in Walter Scott's novel The Bride of Lammermoor (1819).

== History ==
Ravenswood is sited on land once owned by George Washington. Washington acquired the 2,448-acre (10 km^{2}) parcel in 1770, and designated Colonel William Crawford to survey the lands in 1771. A permanent settlement was first established in 1810, and the town streets and lots were laid out in their current pattern by descendants of Washington in 1835. The first town election was held in the home of Bartholomew Fleming in 1840. Ravenswood was incorporated in 1852.

During the American Civil War, the 1863 Battle of Buffington Island took place one mile (1.6 km) north of Ravenswood. In 1886, the Ohio River Rail Road reached Ravenswood.

=== Legend of the Devil’s Baby ===
In the local cemetery is a gravestone marking the grave of George Elwood Sharp, a two-year-old toddler who died 1917. The ceramic photo plate on the stone was said to be "of a demonical baby, complete with hollow eyes, fangs, and horns. What’s more, the claim is that at night the ceramic picture plate on this tombstone emits an eerie, iridescent glow. Not only that, but if you listen carefully, you may be able to hear the child’s disembodied cry drifting through the air across the cemetery lawn."

According to researcher Daniel Reed, the three claims made by the legend can easily be explained: the demonical baby depicted in the image plate is simply the result of years of deterioration; the eerie glow is nothing more than a reflection of the setting sun (or reflection from a security light); and the disembodied cry is likely sounds coming from the nearby residential area (along with psychological priming and confirmation bias of ghost hunters)."

== Industry ==
In 1931, the Ravenswood Glass Novelty Company ("The Marble Factory") opened. When Kaiser Aluminum planned a new facility with 12,000 workers, Bill Finley was hired to plan a "company town" of 25,000. He went on to become a planner with the National Capital Planning Commission, and develop the community of Columbia, Maryland, for the Rouse Company. Henry J. Kaiser opened what was then the world's largest aluminum refinery six miles south of Ravenswood in 1957. The Kaiser facility is now owned by Constellium and Century Aluminum. John F. Kennedy visited Ravenswood during the 1960 Democratic Party presidential primaries. The Ravenswood exit of Interstate 77 opened in 1964.

In February 2010, USA Today referred to Ravenswood as "teetering on a ghost town". Mayor Lucy Harbert responded by bringing in sponsorships from several Silicon Valley–based companies like ScanCafe.com and StartUps.com. On March 26, 2010, Mike Ruben, a reporter with the State Journal newspaper, announced that Ravenswood was "transforming" the town into "Aluminum City, U.S.A." to help attract local tourism revenue: "L.A. Promoter Plans to Market 'Aluminum City'." None of these developments came to fruition.

== Geography ==
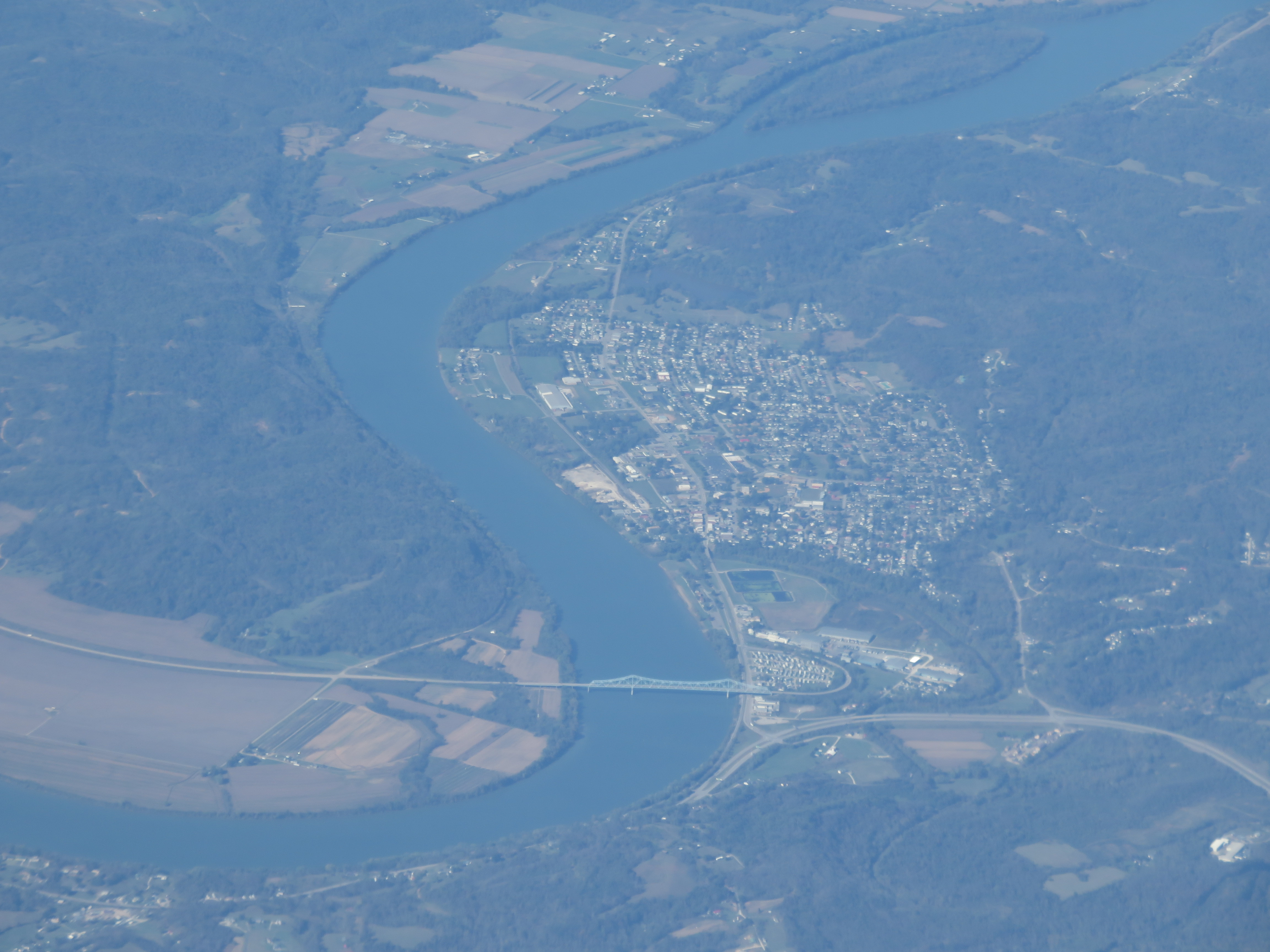
Aerial view of the city

Ravenswood is located at 38°57′11″N 81°45′41″W (38.952922, -81.761357), along the Ohio River at the mouth of Sandy Creek.

According to the United States Census Bureau, the city has a total area of 1.90 square miles (4.92 km^{2}), of which 1.83 square miles (4.74 km^{2}) is land and 0.07 square miles (0.18 km^{2}) is water.

=== Climate ===
The climate in this area is characterized by relatively high temperatures and evenly distributed precipitation throughout the year. According to the Köppen Climate Classification system, Ravenswood has a Humid subtropical climate, abbreviated "Cfa" on climate maps.

Climate data for Ravenswood, West Virginia
Month	Jan	Feb	Mar	Apr	May	Jun	Jul	Aug	Sep	Oct	Nov	Dec	Year
Mean daily maximum °C (°F)	7 (44)	8 (47)	13 (56)	20 (68)	25 (77)	29 (84)	31 (87)	30 (86)	27 (81)	22 (71)	14 (57)	9 (48)	19 (67)
Mean daily minimum °C (°F)	−4 (24)	−4 (25)	0 (32)	5 (41)	10 (50)	14 (58)	17 (62)	16 (61)	13 (55)	6 (43)	1 (34)	−3 (27)	6 (43)
Average precipitation mm (inches)	84 (3.3)	71 (2.8)	94 (3.7)	81 (3.2)	91 (3.6)	94 (3.7)	110 (4.4)	91 (3.6)	69 (2.7)	64 (2.5)	69 (2.7)	76 (3)	1,000 (39.3)
Source: Weatherbase

== Demographics ==
Historical population
Census	Pop.	Note	%±
1870	362		—
1880	681		88.1%
1890	817		20.0%
1900	1,074		31.5%
1910	1,081		0.7%
1920	1,284		18.8%
1930	1,189		−7.4%
1940	1,061		−10.8%
1950	1,175		10.7%
1960	3,410		190.2%
1970	4,240		24.3%
1980	4,126		−2.7%
1990	4,189		1.5%
2000	4,031		−3.8%
2010	3,876		−3.8%
2020	3,865		−0.3%
2021 (est.)	3,847		−0.5%
U.S. Decennial Census

=== 2020 census ===
As of the 2020 census, Ravenswood had a population of 3,865. The median age was 44.2 years. 21.4% of residents were under the age of 18 and 23.5% of residents were 65 years of age or older. For every 100 females there were 87.5 males, and for every 100 females age 18 and over there were 83.5 males age 18 and over.

0.0% of residents lived in urban areas, while 100.0% lived in rural areas.

There were 1,668 households in Ravenswood, of which 27.5% had children under the age of 18 living in them. Of all households, 40.5% were married-couple households, 16.7% were households with a male householder and no spouse or partner present, and 35.1% were households with a female householder and no spouse or partner present. About 34.5% of all households were made up of individuals and 18.1% had someone living alone who was 65 years of age or older.

There were 1,815 housing units, of which 8.1% were vacant. The homeowner vacancy rate was 1.9% and the rental vacancy rate was 6.7%.

Racial composition as of the 2020 census
Race	Number	Percent
White	3,582	92.7%
Black or African American	28	0.7%
American Indian and Alaska Native	10	0.3%
Asian	19	0.5%
Native Hawaiian and Other Pacific Islander	1	0.0%
Some other race	41	1.1%
Two or more races	184	4.8%
Hispanic or Latino (of any race)	72	1.9%

=== 2010 census ===
As of the census of 2010, there were 3,876 people, 1,657 households, and 1,061 families living in the city. The population density was 2,118.0 inhabitants per square mile (817.8/km^{2}). There were 1,807 housing units at an average density of 987.4 units per square mile (381.2 units/km^{2}). The racial makeup of the city was 97.4% White, 0.2% African American, 0.1% Native American, 0.7% Asian, 0.2% from other races, and 1.3% from two or more races. Hispanic or Latino of any race were 1.0% of the population.

There were 1,657 households, of which 29.3% had children under the age of 18 living with them, 45.7% were married couples living together, 14.3% had a female householder with no husband present, 4.0% had a male householder with no wife present, and 36.0% were non-families. 32.0% of all households were made up of individuals, and 17.8% had someone living alone who was 65 years of age or older. The average household size was 2.30 and the average family size was 2.90.

The median age in the city was 42.4 years. 23% of residents were under the age of 18; 8.4% were between the ages of 18 and 24; 21.4% were from 25 to 44; 23.9% were from 45 to 64; and 23.1% were 65 years of age or older. The gender makeup of the city was 46.6% male and 53.4% female.

=== 2000 census ===
As of the census of 2000, there were 4,031 people, 1,692 households, and 1,135 families living in the city. The population density was 2,190.1 people per square mile (845.6 people/km^{2}). There were 1,832 housing units at an average density of 995.4 units per square mile (384.3 units/km^{2}). The racial makeup of the city was 98.04% White, 0.25% African American, 0.05% Native American, 0.74% Asian, 0.15% from other races, and 0.77% from two or more races. Hispanic or Latino of any race were 0.60% of the population.

There were 1,692 households, out of which 29.3% had children under the age of 18 living with them, 52.5% were married couples living together, 12.4% had a female householder with no husband present, and 32.9% were non-families. 30.4% of all households were made up of individuals, and 15.1% had someone living alone who was 65 years of age or older. The average household size was 2.29 and the average family size was 2.83.

In the city, the population was spread out, with 23.6% under the age of 18, 6.6% from 18 to 24, 23.5% from 25 to 44, 22.7% from 45 to 64, and 23.5% who were 65 years of age or older. The median age was 42 years. For every 100 females, there were 84.2 males. For every 100 females age 18 and over, there were 77.1 males.

The median income for a household in the city was $30,308, and the median income for a family was $37,416. Males had a median income of $34,417 versus $21,134 for females. The per capita income for the city was $15,696. About 15.4% of families and 17.6% of the population were below the poverty line, including 26.4% of those under age 18 and 9.7% of those age 65 or over.

== Education ==
Primary and secondary public education is provided by Jackson County Schools. Ravenswood public schools include Henry J. Kaiser Elementary School (Grades K-2), Ravenswood Grade School (Grades 3–5), Ravenswood Middle School (Grades 6–8), and Ravenswood High School (9–12). Ravenswood Grade School is located about 1 1/2 miles outside of the town limits. The other schools are located within the town boundaries. The official mascot of Ravenswood High School is the Red Devil. Lower-level schools are referred to as Demons. Private school education is provided by the Heritage Christian Academy (Grades K-12).

== See also ==
- List of cities and towns along the Ohio River
