= Tornado outbreak of April 21–24, 1968 =

Weather event in the United States

Meteorological history
- Date: April 21–24, 1968

Tornado outbreak
- Tornadoes: 26 confirmed
- Max. rating: F5 tornado
- Duration: 3 days and 12 hours
- Highest gusts: 59 kn (68 mph; 109 km/h) on April 23

Overall effects
- Casualties: 14 fatalities, 525 injuries
- Damage: $47.433 million (1968 USD) (Note: All losses are in 1968 USD unless otherwise noted.) $439 million (2025 USD)
- Areas affected: Midwestern and Southern United States
- Part of the tornado outbreaks of 1968

On April 21–24, 1968, a deadly tornado outbreak struck portions of the Midwestern United States, primarily along the Ohio River Valley. The worst tornado was an F5 that struck portions of Southeastern Ohio from Wheelersburg to Gallipolis, just north of the Ohio–Kentucky state line, killing seven people and injuring at least 93. Another long-tracked violent tornado killed six people, injured 364 others, and produced possible F5 damage as it tracked along the Ohio River. At least one other violent tornado caused an additional fatality and 33 injuries in Ohio. In the end, at least 26 tornadoes touched down, leaving 14 dead, including five in Kentucky and nine in Ohio. (Note: An outbreak is generally defined as a group of at least six tornadoes (the number sometimes varies slightly according to local climatology) with no more than a six-hour gap between individual tornadoes. An outbreak sequence, prior to (after) the start of modern records in 1950, is defined as a period of no more than two (one) consecutive days without at least one significant (F2 or stronger) tornado.) (Note: The Fujita scale was devised under the aegis of scientist T. Theodore Fujita in the early 1970s. Prior to the advent of the scale in 1971, tornadoes in the United States were officially unrated. While the Fujita scale has been superseded by the Enhanced Fujita scale in the U.S. since February 1, 2007, Canada utilized the old scale until April 1, 2013; nations elsewhere, like the United Kingdom, apply other classifications such as the TORRO scale.) (Note: Historically, the number of tornadoes globally and in the United States was and is likely underrepresented: research by Grazulis on annual tornado activity suggests that, as of 2001, only 53% of yearly U.S. tornadoes were officially recorded. Documentation of tornadoes outside the United States was historically less exhaustive, owing to the lack of monitors in many nations and, in some cases, to internal political controls on public information. Most countries only recorded tornadoes that produced severe damage or loss of life. Significant low biases in U.S. tornado counts likely occurred through the early 1990s, when advanced NEXRAD was first installed and the National Weather Service began comprehensively verifying tornado occurrences.)

== Outbreak statistics ==
Impacts by region
Region	Locale	Deaths	Injuries	Damages	Source
United States	Kansas	0	0	$250,000	
United States	Kentucky	5	378	$28,025,000	
United States	Louisiana	0	0	$2,500	
United States	Michigan	0	13	$5,275,000	
United States	North Carolina	0	0	$25,000	
United States	Ohio	9	131	$13,275,000	
United States	Oklahoma	0	2	$300,250	
United States	Tennessee	0	1	$250,000	
United States	Texas	0	0	$30,000	
Total		14	525	$47,433,000	

== Confirmed tornadoes ==
Confirmed tornadoes by Fujita rating
FU	F0	F1	F2	F3	F4	F5	Total
0	3	10	8	2	2	1	26

=== April 21 event ===
Confirmed tornadoes – Sunday, April 21, 1968 (Note: All dates are based on the local time zone where the tornado touched down; however, all times are in Coordinated Universal Time and dates are split at midnight CST/CDT for consistency.) (Note: Prior to 1994, only the average widths of tornado paths were officially listed.)
F#	Location	County / Parish	State	Start coord.	Time (UTC)	Path length	Max. width	Summary
F1	NE of Cedar Valley	Logan	OK	35.88°N 97.53°W	10:00–?	0.2 miles (0.32 km)	100 yards (91 m)	Tornado partially unroofed a home and tore its porch loose. Walls were damaged as well. The home itself shifted somewhat on its foundation. Tornado also wrenched a tree from the soil and felled it. Fencing and barbed wire were torn apart as well. A 2-by-4-inch (51 by 102 mm) board lodged itself into the ground and could not be removed. Losses totaled $25,000.
F2	SW of Medicine Lodge to E of Nashville	Barber, Kingman	KS	37.40°N 98.40°W	21:00–22:10	30.1 miles (48.4 km)	33 yards (30 m)	Damage was intermittent along the path. A trailer, post office, farmhouse, and barns were destroyed or damaged. Losses totaled $250,000. NCEI lists the path as starting south-southeast of Nashville and ending east-southeast of Varner, or west-northwest of Waterloo.
F1	NW of Roxana	Kingfisher	OK	36.15°N 97.72°W	23:20–23:45	0.1 miles (0.16 km)	33 yards (30 m)	Tornado west of Marshall tore a tin roof off a barn and damaged trees. Losses totaled $250.
F2	SW of Shawnee	Angelina	TX	31.20°N 94.52°W	02:00–?	1 mile (1.6 km)	17 yards (16 m)	Tornado blew a CBS-type home off its foundation, damaged a barn, and tore roofing shingles off several houses. Tornado also smashed windows and tore screens loose. 3/4-inch-diameter (1.9 cm) hail attended the parent storm. Losses totaled $2,500. Grazulis did not list the tornado as an F2 or stronger.

=== April 22 event ===
Confirmed tornadoes – Monday, April 22, 1968
F#	Location	County / Parish	State	Start coord.	Time (UTC)	Path length	Max. width	Summary
F0	SW of Aspermont	Stonewall	TX	33.08°N 100.28°W	07:00–07:30	0.1 miles (0.16 km)	33 yards (30 m)	Tornado touched down over open farmland. Losses were unknown.
F1	SW of Ponder	Denton	TX	33.17°N 97.30°W	12:40–?	1.5 miles (2.4 km)	20 yards (18 m)	Tornado damaged three barns, sheared off a large pecan tree, and downed utility poles and fences. A house shifted on its foundation and sustained broken windows as well. Losses totaled $2,500.
F1	NNW of Rhea Mills	Collin	TX	33.28°N 96.73°W	13:50–?	0.5 miles (0.80 km)	17 yards (16 m)	Tornado southeast of Celina struck at a point 9 mi (14 km) northwest of McKinney and reportedly affected two communities, Chambersville and "Rollins". Tornado ripped off a porch and part of a roof from a farmhouse. A few nearby barns were also unroofed. High tension power lines were downed as well. Losses totaled $25,000.
F1	Southwestern Fort Worth	Tarrant	TX	32.67°N 97.42°W	17:08–17:15	0.3 miles (0.48 km)	20 yards (18 m)	Tornado reported east of Benbrook. Losses were unknown.
F0	SE of Hobart	Kiowa	OK	35.02°N 99.08°W	20:00–20:27	0.1 miles (0.16 km)	33 yards (30 m)	Tornado reported. Losses were unknown.
F2	Southern Midwest City	Oklahoma	OK	35.43°N 97.40°W	21:50–?	0.1 miles (0.16 km)	17 yards (16 m)	Tornado destroyed two hangars at Tinker Air Force Base. Tornado then struck a nearby automobile dealership, unroofing the showroom and showering parked cars with debris. Windows, signage, a car wash, and a used-car lot also incurred damage. A 2-by-12-inch (5.1 by 30.5 cm) rafter traveled 800 ft (270 yd) and pierced a windshield. One person was injured and losses totaled $250,000.
F1	Northwestern Wilburton	Latimer	OK	34.92°N 95.35°W	23:40–?	3.3 miles (5.3 km)	67 yards (61 m)	Tornado damaged or destroyed 11 homes, a barn, and three mobile homes. Power lines and trees were downed as well. One person was injured and losses totaled $25,000. Grazulis classified the tornado as an F2.

=== April 23 event ===
Confirmed tornadoes – Tuesday, April 23, 1968
F#	Location	County / Parish	State	Start coord.	Time (UTC)	Path length	Max. width	Summary
F1	Frontier to NNE of Pittsford	Hillsdale	MI	41.78°N 84.60°W	17:50–?	9.3 miles (15.0 km)	200 yards (180 m)	Tornado damaged 54 cottages and homes. One person was injured and losses totaled $250,000.
F4	SW of Falmouth, KY to WNW of Mule Town, OH	Pendleton (KY), Bracken (KY), Mason (KY), Brown (OH), Adams (OH), Scioto (OH)	KY, OH	38.67°N 84.37°W	18:41–?	78.7 miles (126.7 km)	550 yards (500 m)	6 deaths – See section on this tornado – May have been a family of two or three tornadoes and reached F5 intensity at one or more locations. 364 people were injured.
F3	Big Rapids to E of Marion	Mecosta, Osceola	MI	43.70°N 85.48°W	18:53–?	60.9 miles (98.0 km)	100 yards (91 m)	Tornado family struck the town of Big Rapids. A total of 25 homes and businesses were damaged, causing $500,000 in damage. One home lost its roof and two walls, and several cottages were leveled. Four homes were torn apart east of Paris as well, and extensive damage occurred just east of Marion. 11 people were injured and losses totaled $5 million. Grazulis classified the tornado as an F2.
F4	W of Glen Este to E of Westboro	Clermont, Brown, Clinton	OH	39.10°N 84.27°W	18:56–?	24.1 miles (38.8 km)	300 yards (270 m)	1 death – Large tornado, proceeding at 45 to 50 mph (72 to 80 km/h), passed through or near Glen Este, Willowville, Perintown, and Newtonsville. It destroyed 35 homes, 50 barns, and one house trailer. The tornado attained a peak width of 1,000 yd (0.57 mi; 0.91 km) near Newtonsville. 33 people were injured and losses totaled $7.5 million.
F1	SE of Fayette	Fulton	OH	41.70°N 84.30°W	19:15–?	0.1 miles (0.16 km)	100 yards (91 m)	Trees, power lines, and roofing were damaged. Losses totaled $25,000.
F0	Western Livonia	Wayne	MI	42.37°N 83.42°W	19:30–?	0.1 miles (0.16 km)	20 yards (18 m)	One person was injured and losses totaled $25,000.
F2	ENE of Chatham to Dover	Bracken, Mason	KY	38.72°N 84.00°W	19:30–?	≥0.1 miles (0.16 km)	33 yards (30 m)	Secondary tornado struck the same counties already hit by the previous F4. Barns were destroyed in Bracken County. Losses totaled $30. Grazulis did not list the tornado as an F2 or stronger.
F1	N of Fursville to NE of Alexandria	Licking	OH	40.02°N 82.72°W	20:30–?	8.2 miles (13.2 km)	200 yards (180 m)	Tornado formed northwest of Columbia Center, south of Jersey, and bypassed Pataskala. Barns and other outbuildings were extensively damaged or destroyed. A school was partly unroofed and other structures incurred damage to their roofs as well. Losses totaled $250,000.
F2	SE of Harrison Furnace to NNW of Pinkerman	Scioto	OH	38.82°N 82.87°W	20:30–?	4.9 miles (7.9 km)	100 yards (91 m)	Tornado passed south of Minford and struck the Greater Portsmouth Regional Airport, which was known as Scioto County Airport at the time. 12 aircraft were destroyed or damaged at the airport. One man was severely injured when a CBS-type barn collapsed. Several outbuildings and homes were damaged or destroyed as well. Losses totaled $250,000.
F1	Southern Smithville	DeKalb	TN	35.95°N 85.82°W	20:58–?	0.1 miles (0.16 km)	3 yards (2.7 m)	Tornado struck the Miller Heights subdivision in Smithville, unroofing and tearing apart a home. Numerous other structures and three trailers were destroyed or damaged as well. One person was injured and losses totaled $250,000. Grazulis classified the tornado as an F2.
F5	SSE of South Shore to Wheelersburg to Gallipolis	Greenup, Scioto, Lawrence, Gallia	KY, OH	38.70°N 82.80°W	21:05–?	43 miles (69 km)	400 yards (370 m)	7 deaths – See section on this tornado – Rating disputed. 93 people were injured.
F2	NNE of Lyons Point	Acadia	LA	30.13°N 92.35°W	22:00–?	1 mile (1.6 km)	67 yards (61 m)	Tornado occurred south of Crowley. One barn was destroyed, a second barn was damaged, and a house trailer was overturned. Losses totaled $2,500. Grazulis did not list the tornado as an F2 or stronger. NCEI lists the touchdown as southwest of Ebenezer.
F2	Southern Nicholasville to WNW of Union Mills	Jessamine	KY	37.87°N 84.58°W	22:34–?	3.3 miles (5.3 km)	60 yards (55 m)	Several homes sustained roof damage and one lost its roof entirely. Another home shifted off its foundation. A barn was obliterated and scattered over 60 to 70 acres (24 to 28 ha). Three people were injured and losses totaled $250,000. Grazulis listed six injuries.

=== April 24 event ===
Confirmed tornadoes – Wednesday, April 24, 1968
F#	Location	County / Parish	State	Start coord.	Time (UTC)	Path length	Max. width	Summary
F2	SSW of Bayview	Beaufort	NC	35.42°N 76.8°W	22:00–?	2 miles (3.2 km)	200 yards (180 m)	Intermittent, localized damage affected three separate points. Various outbuildings, barns, and a dwelling were destroyed or damaged. Tornado also twisted apart 2-foot-diameter (61 cm; 0.61 m) trees. Losses totaled $25,000. Grazulis did not list the tornado as an F2 or stronger.

=== Falmouth, Kentucky/Otway, Ohio ===
Falmouth, Kentucky/Otway, Ohio
Meteorological history
- Formed: c. 3:40 p.m. April 23, 1968
- Dissipated: c. 5:40 p.m. April 23,1968
- Duration: 2 hours

F4 tornado
- on the Fujita scale
- Highest winds: 207–260 mph (333–418 km/h)

Overall effects
- Fatalities: 6
- Injuries: 364
- Damage: $27,775,250

This destructive, long-tracked, intense tornado began 1 1/2 to 2 mi (2.4 to 3.2 km) southwest of Falmouth, Kentucky, and tracked generally eastward or east-northeastward into town at approximately 3:45 p.m. EDT (19:45 UTC). The tornado passed just southeast of the business district, its parent supercell attended by grapefruit-sized hailstones. The tornado damaged 380 homes in Falmouth and 40% of the town itself. 280 homes in Falmouth were described as having been either destroyed or sustained major damage. Four fatalities and 350 injuries occurred in Pendleton County, Kentucky, primarily in and near Falmouth. Crossing into Bracken County, the tornado caused additional damage in or near the communities of Berlin, Bladeston, and Chatham. Across Bracken County about 70 homes were destroyed or damaged and 175 barns were destroyed. One fatality was reported outside Augusta, and eight other people were injured in Bracken County. Entering Mason County, the tornado devastated Dover at 4:15 p.m. EDT (20:15 UTC), severely damaging 115 of 127 houses there. Six trailers and churches were destroyed and three businesses were damaged as well. Eyewitnesses in Dover reported two or three funnel clouds during the passage of the primary tornado. Two injuries occurred in Mason County. In Kentucky the tornado left 500 to 700 people homeless. The tornado is said to have grown to 1 mile wide and was considered the strongest tornado in Kentucky until April 3, 1974

The tornado then crossed into Brown County, Ohio, south of Levanna and struck Ripley, where 30 homes were damaged, 40 barns were destroyed, and a tobacco warehouse and a shoe plant were badly damaged. Local reports suggested two separate tornado tracks in the area, one north of Ripley and another through town. One fatality occurred about 3 mi (4.8 km) north of Ripley. The main tornado, moving east-northeastward at about 50 mph (80 km/h), then continued through Brown County, destroying 17 barns near Decatur, before moving through Adams County, where 25 homes and barns were damaged or destroyed and four trailer homes were destroyed. Final reports of damage occurred near Otway and Lucasville in Scioto County. Four people were injured in Brown County. The tornado occasionally lifted as it dipped into valleys but mostly remained on the ground, though it may have been a tornado family. It produced high-end F4 damage and may have been an F5 like the Wheelersburg–Gallipolis event, but is officially rated F4. In all, the tornado injured 364 people and caused $27,775,250 in losses.

=== South Shore, Kentucky/Wheelersburg–Gallipolis, Ohio ===
South Shore, Kentucky/Wheelersburg–Gallipolis, Ohio
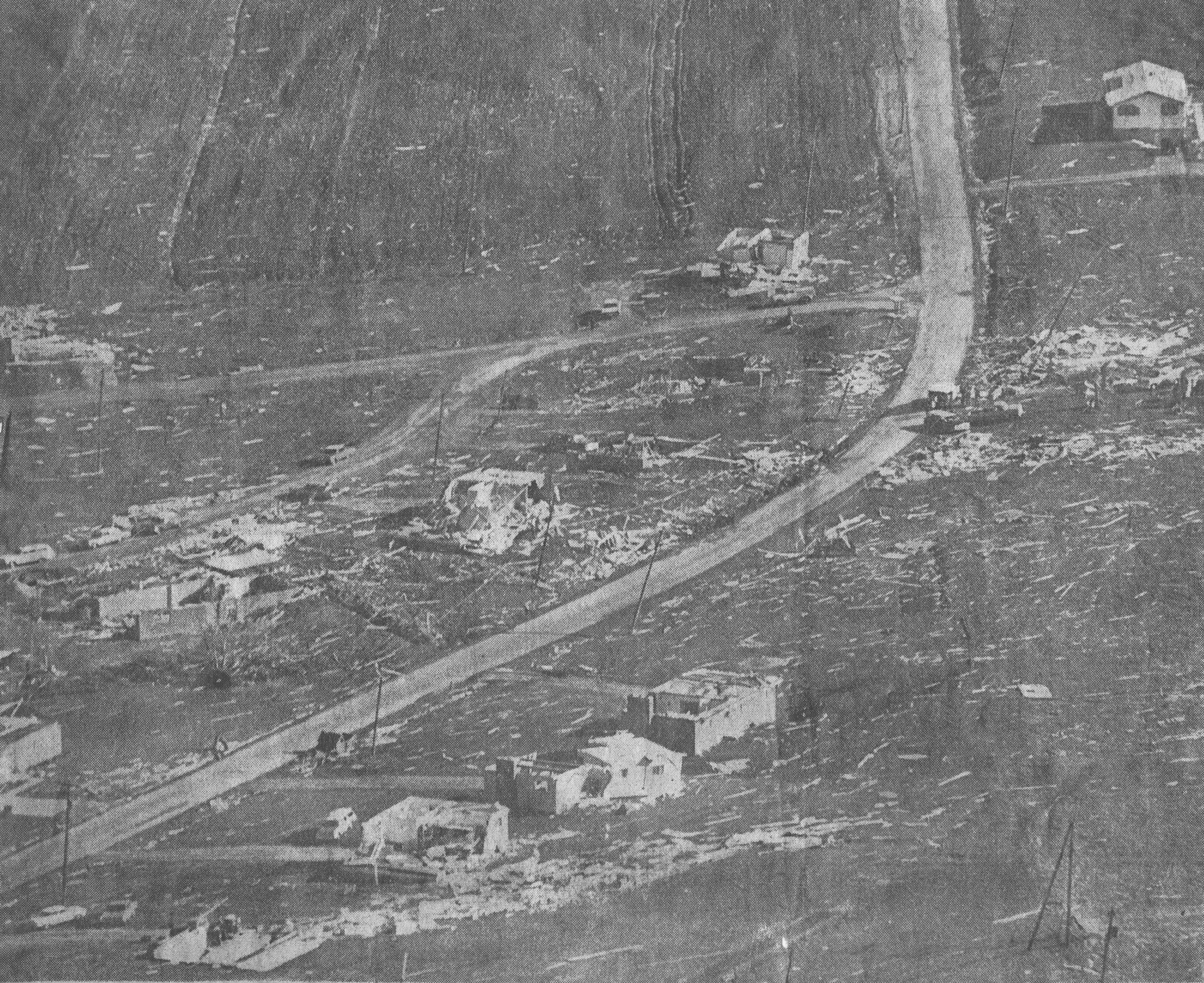
- F5 damage in Wheelersburg.

Meteorological history
- Formed: c. 5:00 p.m. April 23, 1968
- Dissipated: c. 6:30 p.m. April 23, 1968
- Duration: 1 hour, 30 minutes

F5 tornado
- on the Fujita scale
- Highest winds: >261 mph (420 km/h)

Overall effects
- Fatalities: 7
- Injuries: 93
- Damage: $2,750,030
- Areas affected: South Shore, KY to Wheelersburg and Gallipolis, Ohio

At around 5:00 p.m. EDT (21:00 UTC), the deadliest tornado of the outbreak touched down in the South Shore, Kentucky area where it caused F3 level damage to multiple homes and trees. The tornado crossed the Ohio River into Ohio; while doing so, the tornado struck a freight train stationed beside the river, toppling 10 empty coal-hoppers, one of which it lifted 100 ft (30 m; 33 yd). The tornado then affected a combined trucking terminal and garage, a transfer company, a farm supplier, and seven homes at the foot of a hillside. One of the homes was swept from its foundation. Cars were tossed from US 52 as well. The tornado missed downtown Wheelersburg, but peripheral winds downed tree limbs in town, and a number of homes incurred damage as well. Outside Wheelersburg proper, the tornado intensified as it struck the Dogwood Ridge subdivision, causing F5 damage there. Of the 550 homes reportedly destroyed or damaged around Wheelersburg, most were located in the Dogwood Ridge area, approximately 4 mi (6.4 km) east-northeast of town. All known fatalities and 75 injuries occurred in this area. A greenhouse was destroyed and a furniture company had its roof torn off. A large metal power line truss tower was ripped off at the base and thrown by the tornado. Wheelersburg Cemetery was damaged as well. The tornadoes width is said to have been at most 1.1 miles wide and was the strongest tornado in Ohio until April 3, 1974.

Meteorological reports suggested that the tornado weakened after passing Dogwood Ridge and only traveled 4 to 5 mi (6.4 to 8.0 km) in Ohio before dissipating. However, official records indicate that the storm moved east into Lawrence and Gallia counties and affected areas near and around the communities of Lyra, Buckhorn, Cadmus, Centenary, and Gallipolis, where the tornado dissipated 34 mi (55 km) after its initial touchdown. One injury occurred in Lawrence County and 17 more in Gallia County. The tornado caused damage in the Gallipolis area before dissipating, where six house trailers, eight homes, and four farm buildings were destroyed. 15 buildings were damaged at the Gallipolis State Institute. In all, the tornado killed seven people, injured 93 others, and caused at least $2,750,030 in damage (1968 USD), approximately $2 million of which occurred in Scioto County alone. Approximately 69 homes and 28 other buildings were destroyed and another 476 structures were damaged. Then-Governor of Ohio Jim Rhodes called in the National Guard to assist the rescue and cleanup efforts. The F5 rating is disputed due to the fact that the homes that were swept away were not properly anchored to their foundations. Some National Weather Service records show that the tornado began with F3-level damage in Greenup County, Kentucky, making its track 43 mi (69 km) in length. This was the first official F5 tornado in Ohio since tornado records began in 1950. Other F5 tornadoes in Ohio took place in Cincinnati and Xenia (near Dayton) on April 3, 1974, and in Niles near Youngstown and Warren on May 31, 1985.

== Non-tornadic effects ==
Hail of up to 5 in (13 cm) in diameter piled 1 ft (0.30 m) high near Baxter, Harlan County, Kentucky, on April 23. Severe thunderstorm winds gusted to 59 kn (68 mph; 109 km/h) in Wayne County, Michigan, on April 23.

== See also ==
- List of tornadoes and tornado outbreaks
  - List of North American tornadoes and tornado outbreaks

== Sources ==
- Brooks, Harold E. (April 2004). "On the Relationship of Tornado Path Length and Width to Intensity". Weather and Forecasting. 19 (2): 310–19. Bibcode:2004WtFor..19..310B. doi:10.1175/1520-0434(2004)019<0310:OTROTP>2.0.CO;2.
- Cook, A. R.; Schaefer, J. T. (August 2008). "The Relation of El Niño–Southern Oscillation (ENSO) to Winter Tornado Outbreaks". Monthly Weather Review. 136 (8): 3135. Bibcode:2008MWRv..136.3121C. doi:10.1175/2007MWR2171.1.
- Grazulis, Thomas P. (July 1993). Significant Tornadoes 1680–1991: A Chronology and Analysis of Events. St. Johnsbury, Vermont: The Tornado Project of Environmental Films. ISBN 1-879362-03-1.
- Grazulis, Thomas P. (2001a). The Tornado: Nature's Ultimate Windstorm. Norman, Oklahoma: University of Oklahoma Press. ISBN 978-0-8061-3538-0.
- Grazulis, Thomas P. (2001b). F5-F6 Tornadoes. St. Johnsbury, Vermont: The Tornado Project of Environmental Films.
- National Weather Service (April 1968). "Storm Data and Unusual Weather Phenomena". Storm Data. 10 (4). Asheville, North Carolina: National Climatic Data Center.
- National Weather Service (April 1968). Storm Data Publication (Report). National Centers for Environmental Information – via Storm Events Database.
- Neal, Lott; Sam McCown; Tom Ross (August 2000) [1999]. 1998-1999 Tornadoes and a Long-Term U.S. Tornado Climatology (PDF) (Technical report). National Climatic Data Center Technical Report. Asheville, North Carolina: National Climatic Data Center. 99-02.
