= Ohio State Route 371 =

State highway in Scioto County, Ohio, US

State Route 371
- SR 371 highlighted in red

Route information
- Maintained by ODOT
- Length: 0.40 mi (640 m)
- Existed: 1934–present

Major junctions
- South end: Shawnee State Forest near Otway
- North end: SR 73 near Otway

Location
- Country: United States
- State: Ohio
- Counties: Scioto

Highway system
- Ohio State Highway System; Interstate; US; State; Scenic
← SR 370	→ SR 372

State Route 371 (SR 371) is very short north–south state highway in the south central portion of Ohio. Its southern terminus is at a ranger station in Shawnee State Forest, and its northern terminus is at SR 73 approximately six miles (9.7 km) southeast of Otway.

Created in the mid-1930s, this two-lane spur highway, whose entire length is just 0.40 miles (0.64 km), provides access to Shawnee State Park from SR 73.

== Route description ==
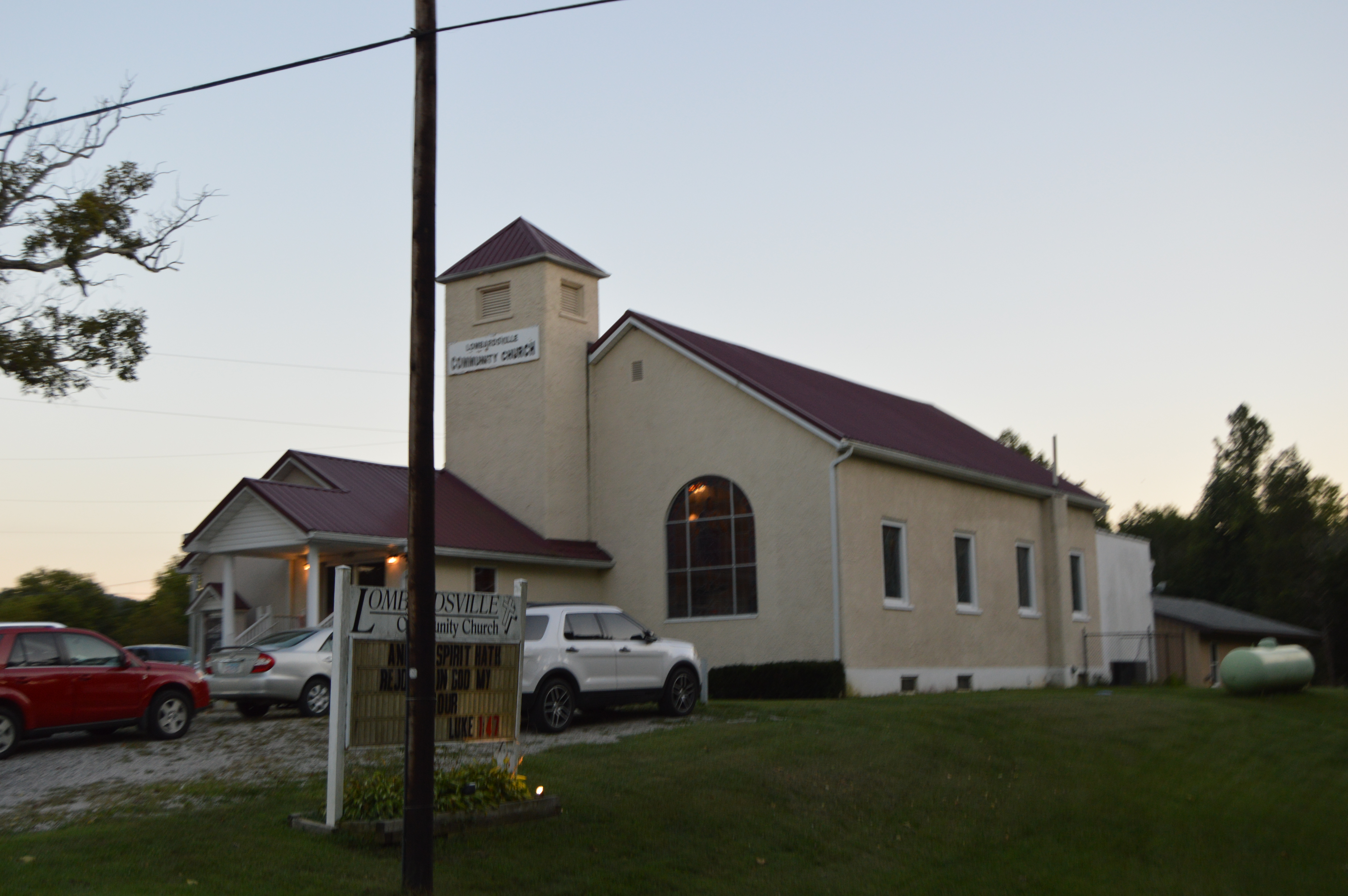
Church at SR 73 / SR 371 in Lombardsville

All of SR 371 is situated within Scioto County's Union Township. It is not included as a part of the National Highway System.

Starting from a ranger station at the entrance to Shawnee State Forest, SR 371 starts out heading northerly, then bending to the northeast, bounded by woods on the west side and fields on the east side, with a couple of residences and one church lining the route. After just 0.40 miles (0.64 km), SR 371 comes to an end as it meets SR 73.

== History ==
This short spur route was first designated in 1934 along its current path, and has not undergone any major changes since its inception.

== Major intersections ==
The entire route is in Union Township, Scioto County.

mi	km	Destinations	Notes
0.00	0.00	Shawnee State Forest	Ranger station
0.40	0.64	SR 73	
1.000 mi = 1.609 km; 1.000 km = 0.621 mi
