= Ohio State Route 73 =

State highway in southern Ohio, US

State Route 73

Route information
- Maintained by ODOT
- Length: 134.80 mi (216.94 km)
- Existed: 1924–present

Major junctions
- West end: US 27 in Oxford
- US 127 in Collinsville; I-75 in Franklin; US 42 in Waynesville; I-71 near Wilmington; US 68 in Wilmington; US 22 / SR 3 in Wilmington; US 50 / US 62 / SR 124 / SR 138 in Hillsboro; US 52 near Portsmouth
- East end: US 23 / SR 104 in Portsmouth

Location
- Country: United States
- State: Ohio
- Counties: Butler, Warren, Clinton, Highland, Adams, Scioto

Highway system
- Ohio State Highway System; Interstate; US; State; Scenic
← I-73	→ I-74

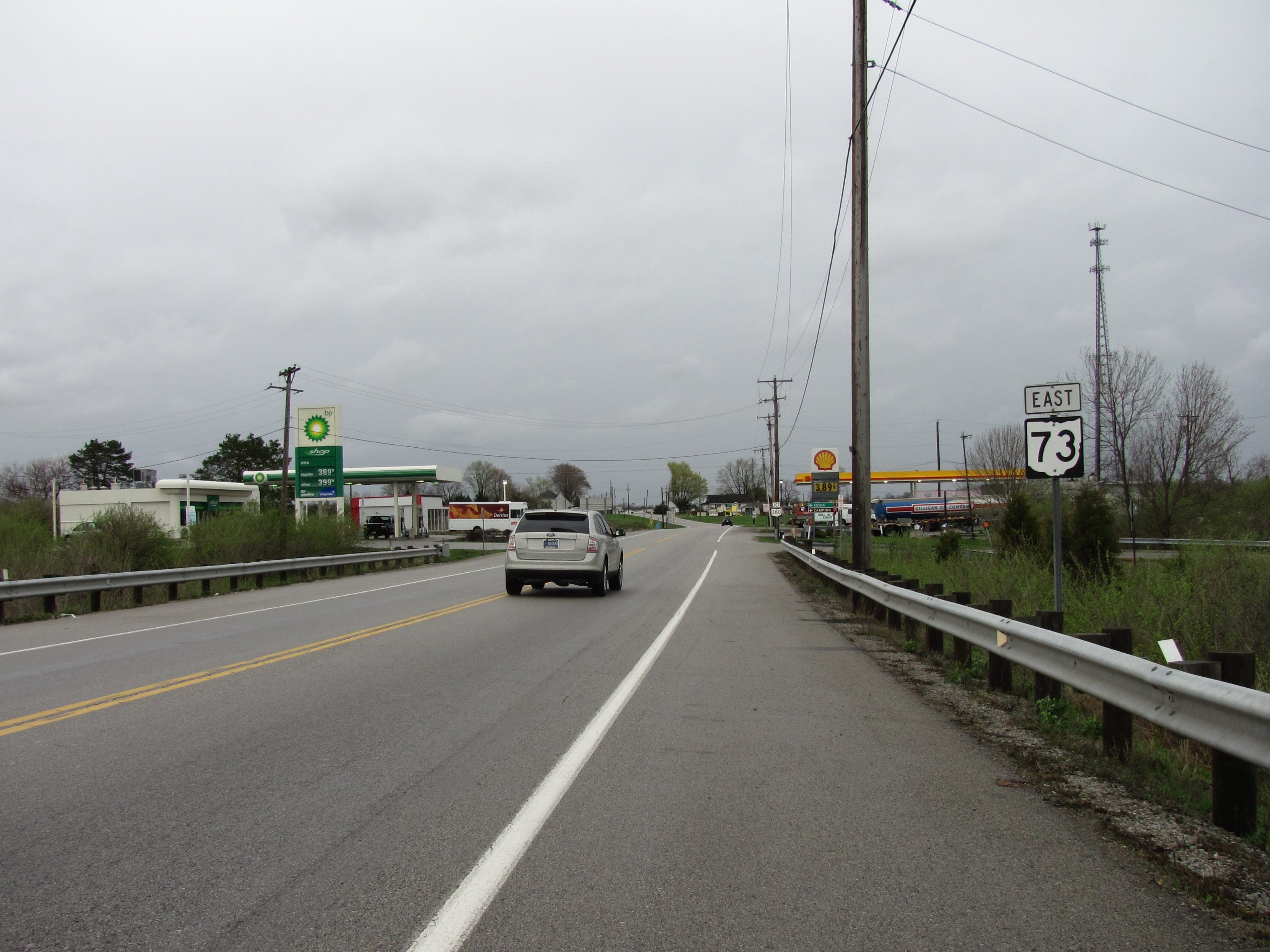
Eastbound in Wilmington, Ohio

State Route 73 (SR 73) is an east–west state highway in the southern portion of the U.S. state of Ohio. Its western terminus is on U.S. Route 27 in Oxford at the intersection of SR 732. SR 73's eastern terminus is in Portsmouth at US 23; this is also the southern terminus of SR 104, and the two state routes run concurrently for over 6 miles (9.7 km) from this point north. Once SR 73 enters Scioto County, it is designated as the Scenic Scioto Heritage Trail by the Ohio Department of Transportation.

In combination with SR 32, SR 73's easternmost 31 miles (50 km) are part of the quickest route between Cincinnati and Portsmouth.

== Route description ==
The portion of SR 73 between Interstate 75 and SR 741 in Springboro is designated as the "Officer Bill Johnson Memorial Highway", in honor of William L. "Bill" Johnson, a 48-year-old, eight-year veteran of the Springboro Police Department who was struck and killed by a vehicle around 12:30 a.m. on June 27, 1983, while outside his cruiser on SR 73, investigating two people walking in the roadway.

== Points of interest ==
- Great Miami River - Middletown, Franklin
- Excello Locks - Historic Remains of a lock on the Miami-Erie Canal near the intersection of 73 and S. Main St. in Middletown, Ohio. Much of the route between Trenton and Franklin follows the original path of the Miami and Erie Canal.
- Middletown Historical Society Canal Museum
- Springboro Historic District - Springboro at SR 741.
- La Comedia Dinner Theatre - Springboro
- Little Miami River - Waynesville
- Little Miami Bike Trail - Corwin
- Caesar Creek Lake - Warren County
- Caesar Creek State Park - Warren, Clinton County
- Serpent Mound
- Brush Creek State Forest
- Shawnee State Forest
- Scioto River
- Ohio River

== History ==
- 1924 – Original route established; originally routed from Franklin to 1-mile (1.6 km) west of Portsmouth (dually certified with State Route 104 from 1-mile (1.6 km) north of Coles Park to 1-mile (1.6 km) west of Portsmouth before 1926).
- 1926 – Extended to 2 miles (3.2 km) east of Middletown along the previous State Route 6; State Route 104 certification removed.
- March 9, 1932 – Extended to the U.S. Route 127 about 1-mile (1.6 km) northwest of Seven Mile.
- 1936 – Extended to Oxford.
- 1952 – Dually certified with State Route 104 from 1-mile (1.6 km) north of Coles Park to 1-mile (1.6 km) west of Portsmouth.
- 1957 – From Excello to Franklin upgraded to 4 lanes.
- 1962 – From 1-mile (1.6 km) north of West Portsmouth to 1-mile (1.6 km) west of Portsmouth upgraded to 4 lanes.
- 1966 – From Franklin to Interstate 75 upgraded to 4 lanes.
- 1972 – Extended to Portsmouth (dually certified with State Route 104) along the former alignment of U.S. Route 23.
- 1979 – From Interstate 75 to Springboro upgraded to divided highway.
- 1980 – From Trenton to Excello upgraded to divided highway.
- 2011 – Realigned around Wilmington along a new bypass.

== Major junctions ==
County	Location	mi	km	Destinations	Notes
Butler	Oxford	0.00	0.00	US 27 north (West High Street) / SR 732 (Main Street)	Western end of US 27 concurrency
Butler	Oxford	0.81	1.30	US 27 south (South Patterson Avenue)	Eastern end of US 27 concurrency
Butler	Milford Township	4.38	7.05	SR 177 – Hamilton, Richmond, Ind.	
Butler	Milford Township	7.32	11.78	US 127 north / Huston Road – Eaton	Western end of US 127 concurrency
Butler	Wayne Township	9.89	15.92	US 127 south – Hamilton	Eastern end of US 127 concurrency
Butler	Wayne Township	10.72	17.25	SR 503 – West Elkton, Seven Mile	
Butler	Lemon Township	18.23– 18.87	29.34– 30.37	SR 4 south / Oxford State Road – Hamilton	Western end of SR 4 concurrency
Butler	Middletown	20.99	33.78	SR 122 (Second Avenue)	Western end of SR 122 eastbound concurrency (northbound SR 4 / eastbound SR 73 only)
Butler	Middletown	21.05	33.88	SR 122 east (First Avenue)	Eastern end of SR 122 eastbound concurrency (northbound SR 4 / eastbound SR 73 only)
Butler	Middletown	21.44	34.50	SR 122 west (Reinartz Boulevard)	
Butler	Middletown	22.55	36.29	SR 4 north (Germantown Road) / Nelbar Street	Eastern end of SR 4 concurrency
Warren	Franklin	27.41	44.11	SR 123 south (Sixth Street)	Western end of SR 123 concurrency
Warren	Franklin	27.76	44.68	SR 123 north (Main Street / River Street) / Park Avenue	Eastern end of SR 123 concurrency
Warren	Franklin–Springboro city line	29.48– 29.69	47.44– 47.78	I-75 – Cincinnati, Dayton	Exit 38 (I-75)
Warren	Springboro	31.57	50.81	SR 741 (Main Street)	
Warren	Clearcreek Township	35.31	56.83	SR 48 – Centerville, Lebanon	
Warren	Waynesville	39.98	64.34	US 42 – Xenia, Lebanon	
Clinton	Chester Township	48.67– 48.91	78.33– 78.71	I-71 – Cincinnati, Columbus	Exit 45 (I-71)
Clinton	Chester Township	49.08	78.99	SR 380 – Xenia	
Clinton	Western end of freeway				
Clinton	Union Township	54.56– 55.20	87.81– 88.84	US 68 – Xenia, Wilmington	
Clinton	Wilmington	58.17– 58.86	93.62– 94.73	US 22 / SR 3 – Wilmington, Washington Court House	
Clinton	Eastern end of freeway				
Clinton	Green Township	66.46	106.96	SR 350 west – Clarksville, Cowan Lake State Park	Western end of SR 350 concurrency
Clinton	Green Township	66.70	107.34	SR 729 north / Thornburg Road – Sabina	Southern terminus of SR 729
Clinton	New Vienna	68.80	110.72	SR 28 (West Street) / SR 350 ends – Greenfield, Blanchester	Eastern end of SR 350 concurrency
Highland	Hillsboro	78.58	126.46	US 50 west / SR 124 west (West Main Street) / South West Street	Western end of US 50 / SR 124 concurrency
Highland	Hillsboro	78.71	126.67	US 50 east / SR 124 east (East Main Street) / US 62 east / SR 138 north (North High Street)	Eastern end of US 50 / SR 124 concurrency; western end of US 62 / SR 138 concurrencies
Highland	Hillsboro	78.90	126.98	SR 138 south (South Street)	Eastern end of SR 138 concurrency
Highland	Hillsboro	79.08	127.27	US 62 west (South High Street)	Eastern end of US 62 concurrency
Highland	Hillsboro	79.22	127.49	SR 247 south (South East Street)	Northern terminus of SR 247
Highland	Jackson Township	89.92	144.71	SR 785 west	Eastern terminus of SR 785
Highland–Adams county line	Jackson–Bratton township line	92.64	149.09	SR 770 south / Davis Road – [[, Ohio|]]	Northern terminus of SR 770
Adams	Franklin Township	100.28	161.39	SR 41 north – Sinking Spring	Western end of SR 41 concurrency
Adams	Franklin Township	100.54	161.80	SR 41 south – Peebles	Eastern end of SR 41 concurrency
Adams	Franklin Township	103.00– 103.02	165.76– 165.79	SR 32 (James A. Rhodes Appalachian Highway) – Jackson, Cincinnati	
Scioto	Rarden	109.80	176.71	SR 772 north (Depot Street)	Southern terminus of SR 772
Scioto	Otway	115.13	185.28	SR 348 east (Walnut Street)	Western end of SR 348 concurrency
Scioto	Otway	115.28	185.53	SR 348 west	Eastern end of SR 348 concurrency
Scioto	Union Township	121.13	194.94	SR 371 south – Shawnee State Park	Northern terminus of SR 371
Scioto	Rush Township	128.43	206.69	SR 104 north	Western end of SR 104 concurrency
Scioto	Washington Township	132.45	213.16	SR 239 south to US 52	Northern terminus of SR 239
Scioto	Washington Township	132.98– 133.71	214.01– 215.19	US 52 / US 23 Truck south / SR 852 south – Cincinnati, Kentucky, Ironton	Interchange; northern terminus of SR 852; no access from SR 73 westbound to US 52 eastbound
Scioto	Portsmouth	134.69	216.76	US 23 / Washington Street	Western end of US 23 southbound concurrency
Scioto	Portsmouth	134.80	216.94	US 23 (Chillicothe Street / U.S. Grant Bridge) / SR 104 ends / 2nd Street	Eastern end of US 23 southbound / SR 104 concurrencies
1.000 mi = 1.609 km; 1.000 km = 0.621 mi: Concurrency terminus; Incomplete access
