= Nile Township, Scioto County, Ohio =

Township in Ohio, US

Nile Township
- Township
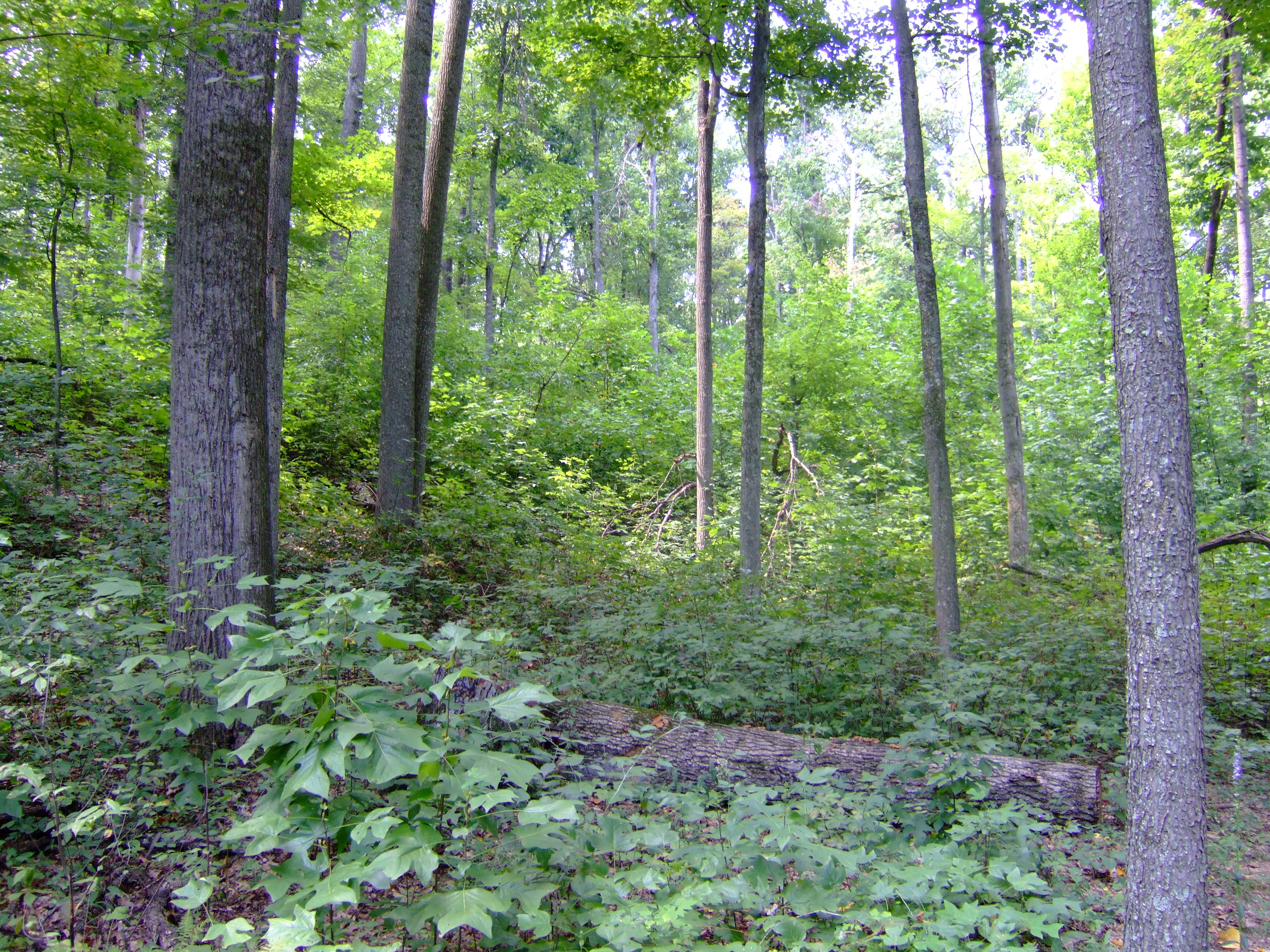
- Woods at Shawnee State Park

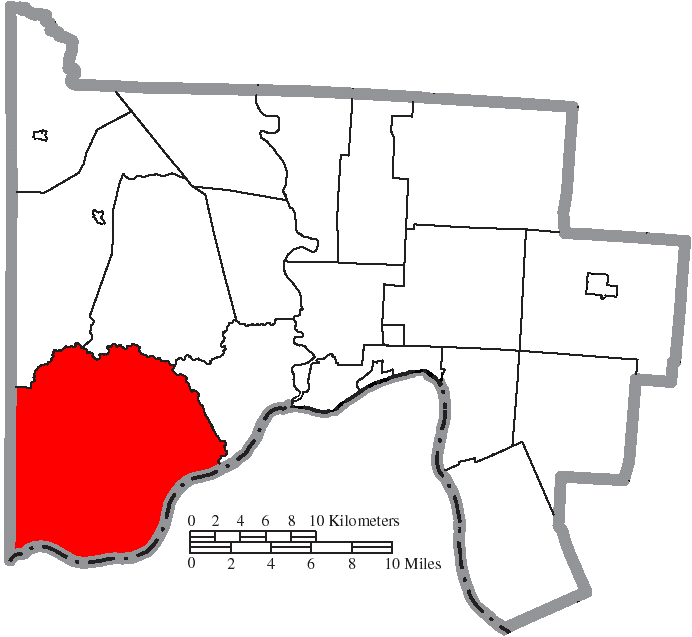
- Location of Nile Township in Scioto County
- Coordinates: 38°41′24″N 83°10′36″W
- Country: United States
- State: Ohio
- County: Scioto
- Established: Volunteer Fire and EMS services (please add any info on this subject)

Area
  - Total: 86.6 sq mi (224.3 km^{2})
  - Land: 85.9 sq mi (222.6 km^{2})
  - Water: 0.66 sq mi (1.7 km^{2})
- Elevation: 883 ft (269 m)

Population (2020)
  - Total: 2,350
  - Density: 27/sq mi (10.6/km^{2})
- Time zone: UTC-5 (Eastern (EST))
  - Summer (DST): UTC-4 (EDT)
- FIPS code: 39-55902
- GNIS feature ID: 1086931

Nile Township is one of the sixteen townships of Scioto County, Ohio, United States. The 2020 census found 2,350 people in the township.

== Geography ==
Located in the southwestern corner of the county along the Ohio River, it borders the following townships:

- Brush Creek Township - north
- Union Township - northeast
- Washington Township - east
- Green Township, Adams County - west
- Jefferson Township, Adams County - northwest

Lewis County, Kentucky lies across the Ohio River to the south.

No municipalities are located in Nile Township, although the census-designated place of Friendship lies in the township's boundaries.

Shawnee State Forest covers much of Nile Township as well as neighboring Washington Township.

It has the greatest area of any township in the county.

== Name and history ==
Nile Township was organized August 9, 1803. The township takes its name from the Nile river in Egypt. It is the only Nile Township statewide.

== Government ==
The township is governed by a three-member board of trustees, who are elected in November of odd-numbered years to a four-year term beginning on the following January 1. Two are elected in the year after the presidential election and one is elected in the year before it. There is also an elected township fiscal officer, who serves a four-year term beginning on April 1 of the year after the election, which is held in November of the year before the presidential election. Vacancies in the fiscal officership or on the board of trustees are filled by the remaining trustees.

== Education ==
Township residents are served by the Washington-Nile Local School District.
