= Otway Covered Bridge =

- U.S. National Register of Historic Places
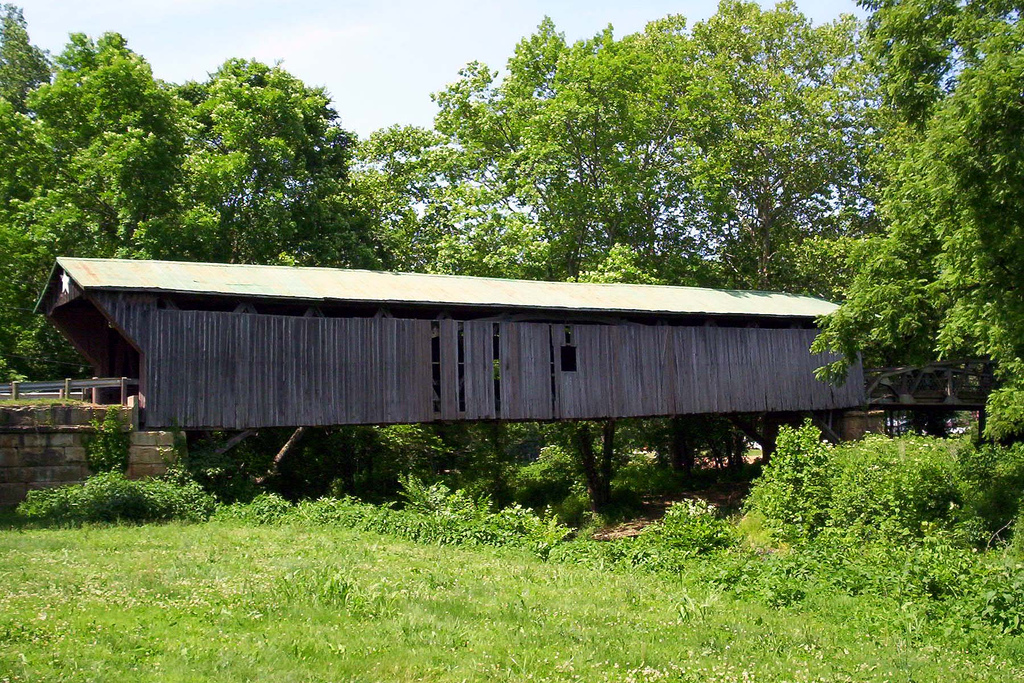
- Bridge in 2006
- Location: North of OH 348, Otway, Ohio
- Coordinates: 38°51′46″N 83°11′24″W
- Area: 3.9 acres (1.6 ha)
- Built: 1874
- Architects: Smith Bridge Co.; Multiple
- NRHP reference No.: 74002280
- Added to NRHP: May 3, 1974

The Otway Covered Bridge, in Scioto County, Ohio north of Ohio State Route 348 in Otway, was built in 1874 by the Smith Bridge Co. of Toledo, Ohio. It was listed on the National Register of Historic Places in 1974.

It is a 127 feet (39 m) Smith type timber truss covered bridge crossing Scioto Brush Creek in Brush Creek Township, Scioto County, Ohio.

The Otway Historical Society took ownership after the bridge was bypassed and closed to traffic in 1961; volunteers of the society performed maintenance subsequently but the bridge deteriorated. In March 2012, a tornado damaged the roof of the bridge, and in August 2012, a federal grant was awarded for its repair and preservation, which was concluded in August 2014 with a ribbon-cutting ceremony. A major rehabilitation involving the Scioto County Engineer, Otway Historical Society, Jones-Stuckey, Ltd, J.A. Barker Engineering and The Righter Company garnered a "Preservation Merit Award" from the Ohio State Historic Preservation Office in 2015.

It is mentioned in the Ohio Historic Places Dictionary.
