= Brush Creek Township, Scioto County, Ohio =

Township in Ohio, US

- Township
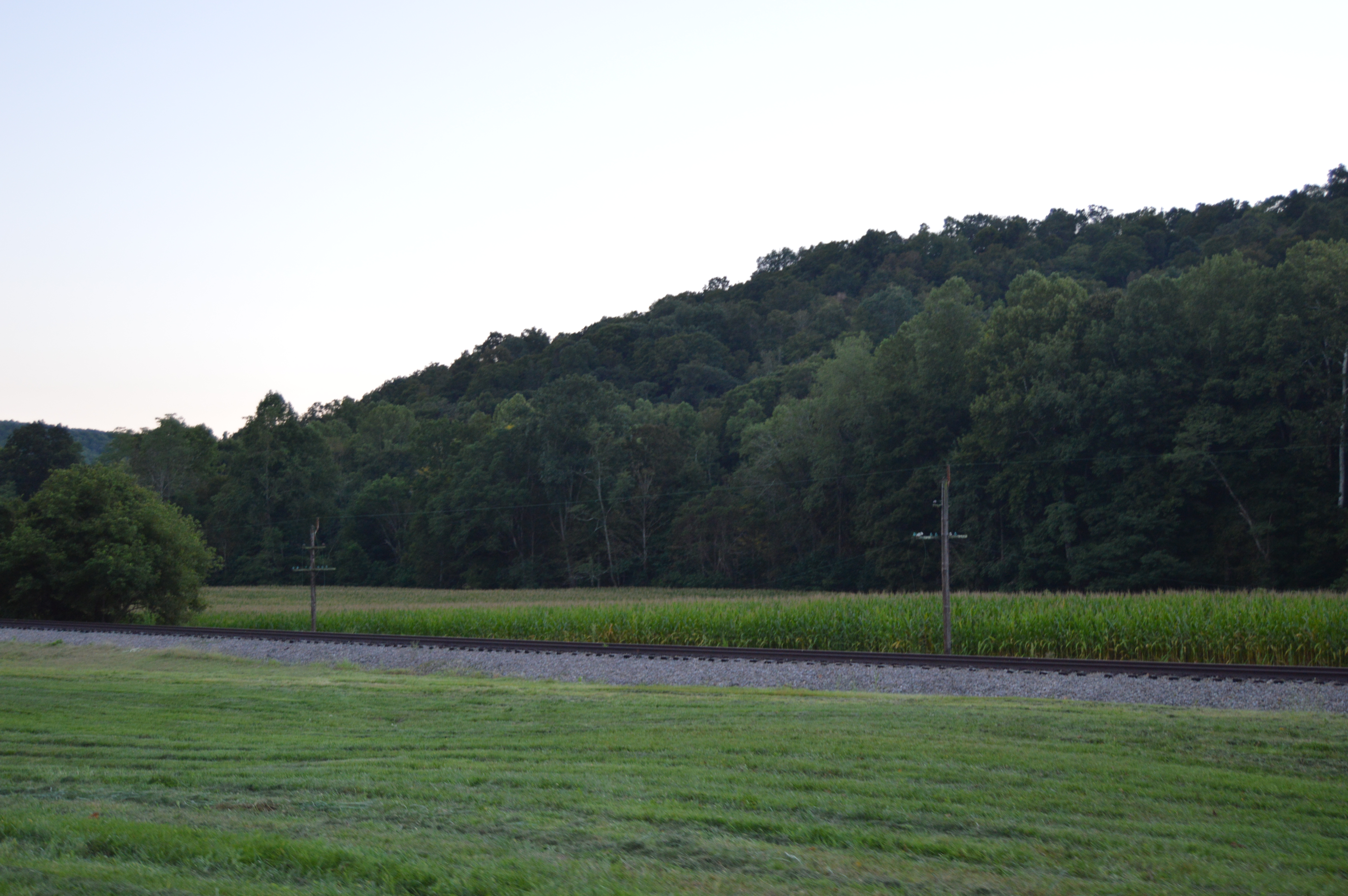
- State Route 73 south of Otway

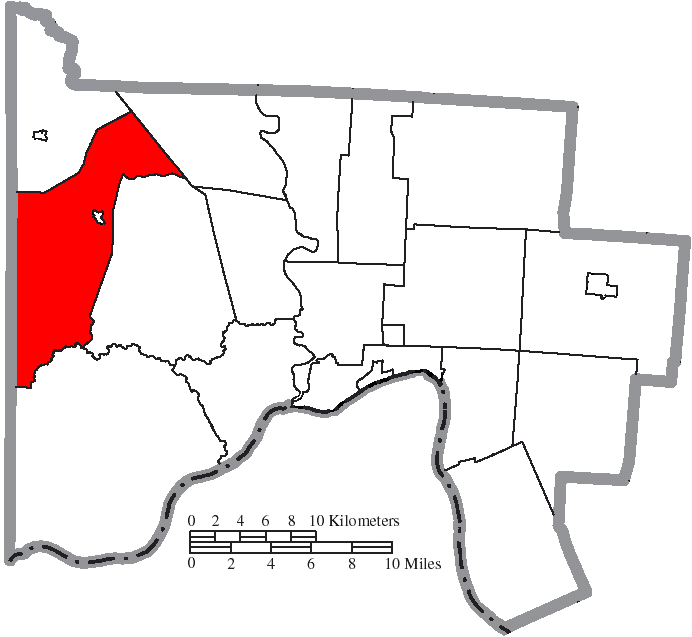
- Location of Brush Creek Township in Scioto County
- Coordinates: 38°50′24″N 83°13′22″W
- Country: United States
- State: Ohio
- County: Scioto

Area
  - Total: 50.5 sq mi (130.9 km^{2})
  - Land: 50.5 sq mi (130.9 km^{2})
  - Water: 0 sq mi (0.0 km^{2})
- Elevation: 735 ft (224 m)

Population (2020)
  - Total: 1,114
  - Density: 22.04/sq mi (8.510/km^{2})
- Time zone: UTC-5 (Eastern (EST))
  - Summer (DST): UTC-4 (EDT)
- FIPS code: 39-09764
- GNIS feature ID: 1086923

Brush Creek Township is one of the sixteen townships of Scioto County, Ohio, United States. The 2020 census counted 1,114 people in the township.

== Geography ==
Located in the western part of the county, it borders the following townships:

- Rarden Township - north
- Morgan Township - northeast
- Union Township - east
- Nile Township - south
- Jefferson Township, Adams County - west
- Meigs Township, Adams County - northwest

The village of Otway lies in the township's northeast.

== Name and history ==
Statewide, other Brush Creek Townships are located in Adams, Highland, Jefferson, and Muskingum counties.

Brush Creek Township was organized in 1820. Its earliest inhabitants date to before 1800.

== Government ==
The township is governed by a three-member board of trustees, who are elected in November of odd-numbered years to a four-year term beginning on the following January 1. Two are elected in the year after the presidential election and one is elected in the year before it. There is also an elected township fiscal officer, who serves a four-year term beginning on April 1 of the year after the election, which is held in November of the year before the presidential election. Vacancies in the fiscal officership or on the board of trustees are filled by the remaining trustees.
