= Pond Run =

Pond Run may refer to:

- Pond Run, New Jersey
- Pond Run, Ohio
