= Shawnee State Park =

Shawnee State Park can refer to either of two state parks in the United States:

- Shawnee State Park (Ohio)
- Shawnee State Park (Pennsylvania)
