= Harrison Mills, Ohio =

Unincorporated community in Ohio, U.S.

Coordinates: 38°49′55″N 82°48′29″W

Harrison Mills is an unincorporated community in Scioto County, in the U.S. state of Ohio.

== History ==
A post office called Harrison Mills was established in 1862, and remained in operation until 1903. Besides the post office, Harrison Mills had a United Brethren church, established in 1902.
