= Bloom Junction, Ohio =

Unincorporated community in Ohio, U.S.

Coordinates: 38°48′21″N 82°41′34″W

Bloom Junction is an unincorporated community in Scioto County, in the U.S. state of Ohio.

== History ==
A variant name was Bloom Switch. A post office called Bloom Switch was established in 1870, and remained in operation until 1918. Besides the post office, the community had the Bloom Baptist Church.
