= Hales Creek, Ohio =

Unincorporated community in Ohio, U.S.

Coordinates: 38°48′40″N 82°40′32″W

Hales Creek is an unincorporated community in Scioto County, in the U.S. state of Ohio.

== History ==
A post office called Hales Creek was established in 1858, and remained in operation until 1918. The community takes its name from nearby Hales Creek. Besides the post office, Hales Creek had a station on the railroad.
