= Slocum, Ohio =

Unincorporated community in Ohio, U.S.

Coordinates: 38°45′59″N 82°50′33″W

Slocum is an unincorporated community in Scioto County, in the U.S. state of Ohio.

== History ==
Variant names were Slocums, Slocums Station, Wait, and Watt. A post office called Slocums Station was established in 1866 and closed in 1869. The post office reopened under the name Waits in 1875, the name was changed to Wait in 1894, and the post office was discontinued in 1906. Members of the Slocum family were among the early settlers at Slocums Station.
