= Wallace Mills, Ohio =

Unincorporated community in Ohio, U.S.

Coordinates: 38°51′30″N 82°47′50″W

Wallace Mills is an unincorporated community in Scioto County, in the U.S. state of Ohio.

== History ==
The community's namesake Wallace Mills was a watermill built in 1844. A post office called Wallace Mills was established in 1879, and remained in operation until 1904.
