= Dry Run, Scioto County, Ohio =

Unincorporated community in Ohio, U.S.

Coordinates: 38°46′38″N 83°01′44″W

Dry Run is an unincorporated community in Scioto County, in the U.S. state of Ohio.

== History ==
A post office called Dry Run was established in 1888, and remained in operation until 1908. The community takes its name from nearby Dry Run creek. Besides the post office, Dry Run had a schoolhouse.
