= Sedan, Ohio =

Unincorporated community in Ohio, U.S.

Coordinates: 38°56′51″N 83°07′06″W

Sedan is an unincorporated community in Scioto County, in the U.S. state of Ohio.

== History ==
A post office called Sedan was established in 1871, and remained in operation until 1918. Besides the post office, Sedan had at least two early churches.
