= McGaw, Ohio =

Unincorporated community in Ohio, U.S.

Coordinates: 38°38′16″N 83°13′29″W

McGaw is an unincorporated community in Scioto County, in the U.S. state of Ohio.

== History ==
A post office called McGaw was established in 1893, and remained in operation until 1919. Besides the post office, McGaw had a church and country store.
