= Bear Creek, Ohio =

Unincorporated community in Ohio, U.S.

Coordinates: 38°55′52″N 83°03′57″W

Bear Creek is an unincorporated community in Scioto County, in the U.S. state of Ohio.

== History ==
A post office called Bear Creek was established in 1871, the name was changed to Bearcreek in 1895, and the post office closed in 1904. The community takes its name from nearby Bear Creek.
