= Henley, Ohio =

Unincorporated community in Ohio, U.S.

Coordinates: 38°50′41″N 83°09′22″W

Henley is an unincorporated community in Scioto County, in the U.S. state of Ohio.

== History ==
Henley had its start as a railway shipping point for the local lumber industry. The community was named after Reverend R. B. Henley, a railroad promoter. A post office was established at Henley in 1882, and remained in operation until 1936.
