= Washington Township, Scioto County, Ohio =

Township in Ohio, US

- Township
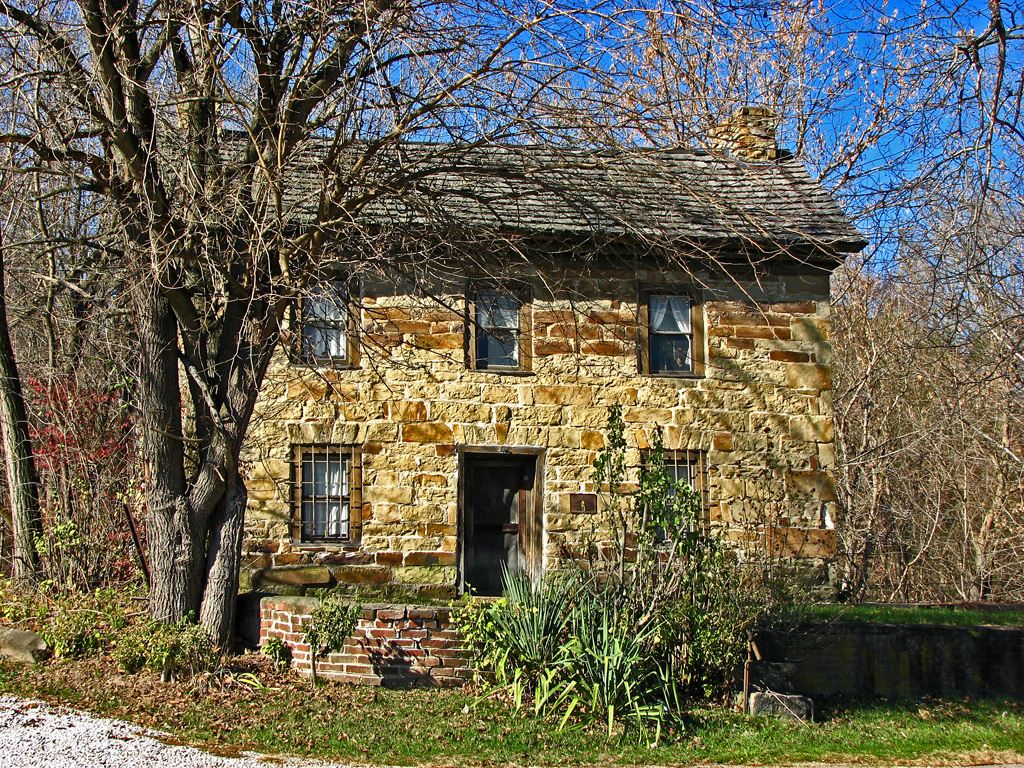
- The Philip Moore Stone House, built 1797

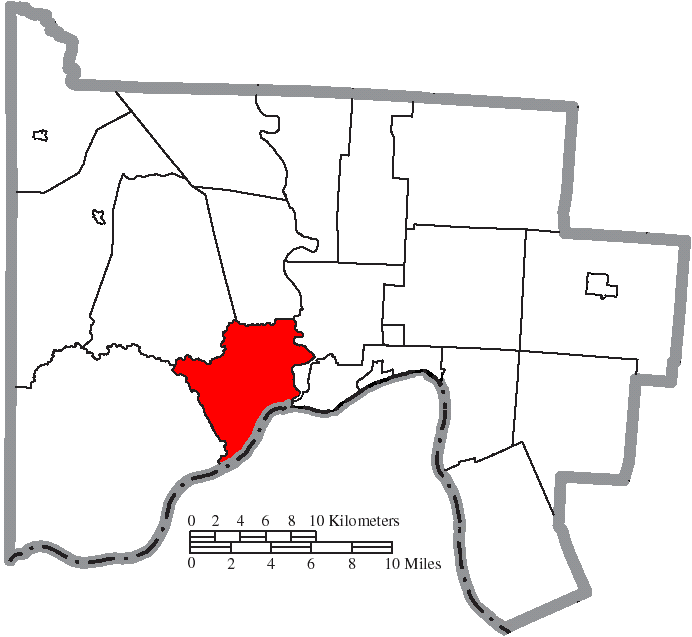
- Location of Washington Township in Scioto County
- Coordinates: 38°45′11″N 83°2′10″W
- Country: United States
- State: Ohio
- County: Scioto

Area
  - Total: 25.4 sq mi (65.8 km^{2})
  - Land: 24.9 sq mi (64.6 km^{2})
  - Water: 0.50 sq mi (1.3 km^{2})
- Elevation: 719 ft (219 m)

Population (2020)
  - Total: 5,214
  - Density: 209/sq mi (80.7/km^{2})
- Time zone: UTC-5 (Eastern (EST))
  - Summer (DST): UTC-4 (EDT)
- FIPS code: 39-81606
- GNIS feature ID: 1086939

Washington Township is one of the sixteen townships of Scioto County, Ohio, United States. The 2020 census counted 5,214 people in the township.

== Geography ==
Located in the southern part of the county along the Ohio River, it borders the following townships:

- Rush Township - north
- Clay Township - northeast
- Nile Township - southwest
- Union Township - northwest

Across the Ohio River lies Kentucky to the south: Greenup County to the southeast, and Lewis County to the southwest.

No municipalities are located in Washington Township, although the census-designated place of West Portsmouth lies in the northern part of the township.

Shawnee State Forest covers much of Washington Township as well as neighboring Nile Township.

== Name and history ==
Named after George Washington, it is one of forty-three Washington Townships statewide.

Washington Township was organized in 1814.

== Government ==
The township is governed by a three-member board of trustees, who are elected in November of odd-numbered years to a four-year term beginning on the following January 1. Two are elected in the year after the presidential election and one is elected in the year before it. There is also an elected township fiscal officer, who serves a four-year term beginning on April 1 of the year after the election, which is held in November of the year before the presidential election. Vacancies in the fiscal officership or on the board of trustees are filled by the remaining trustees.

== Education ==
Citizens of the township are served by the Washington-Nile Local School District.
