= Philip Moore Stone House =

Historic house in Ohio, United States

- U.S. National Register of Historic Places
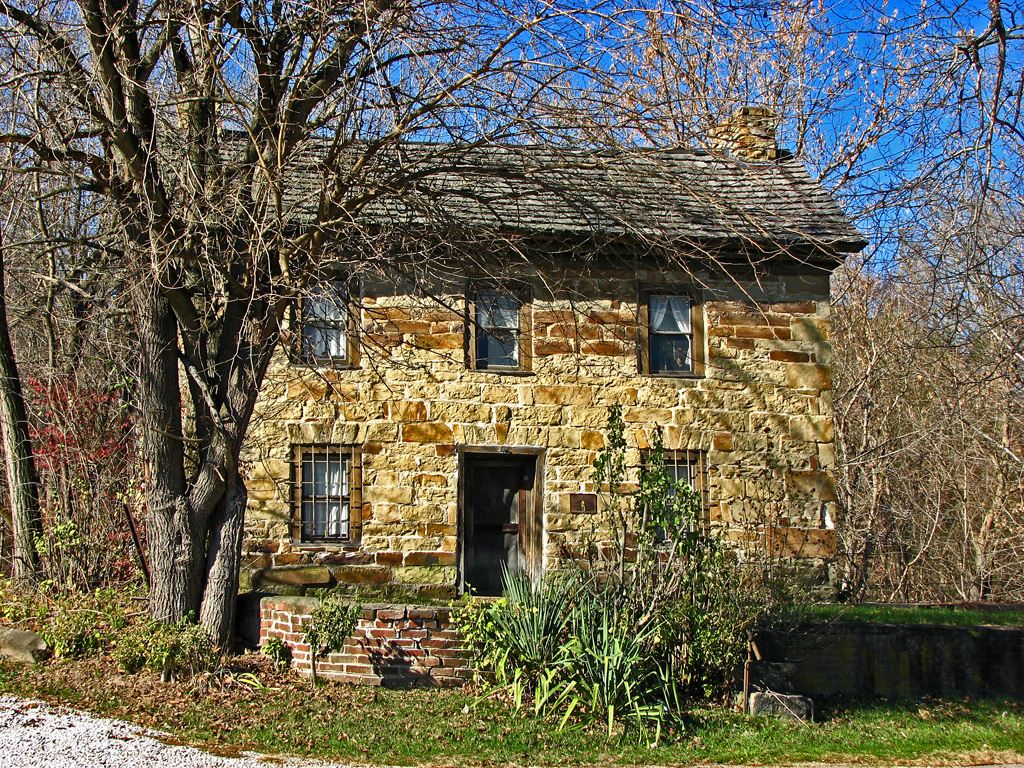
- Front of the house

- Location within Ohio Location within the United States
- Nearest city: West Portsmouth, Ohio
- Coordinates: 38°44′36″N 83°2′2″W
- Area: less than one acre
- Built: 1797
- NRHP reference No.: 75001531
- Added to NRHP: October 21, 1975

The Philip Moore Stone House is located on Ohio State Route 239 in Washington Township, Scioto County, Ohio. The property was placed on the National Register on 1975-10-21.

The house is now available for rental and is open to the public on select days.
