= Rushtown, Ohio =

Unincorporated community in Ohio, US

Coordinates: 38°49′58″N 83°01′12″W

Rushtown is an unincorporated community in Scioto County, in the U.S. state of Ohio.

== History ==
A post office called Rushtown was established in 1878, and remained in operation until 1959. Besides the post office, Rushtown had a station on the Norfolk and Western Railroad. The confluence of Scioto Brush Creek into the Scioto River at Rushtown has produced a rocky zone within the river known as the Rushtown Riffles, which is popular with local kayakers.
