= Union Township, Scioto County, Ohio =

Township in Ohio, US

- Township
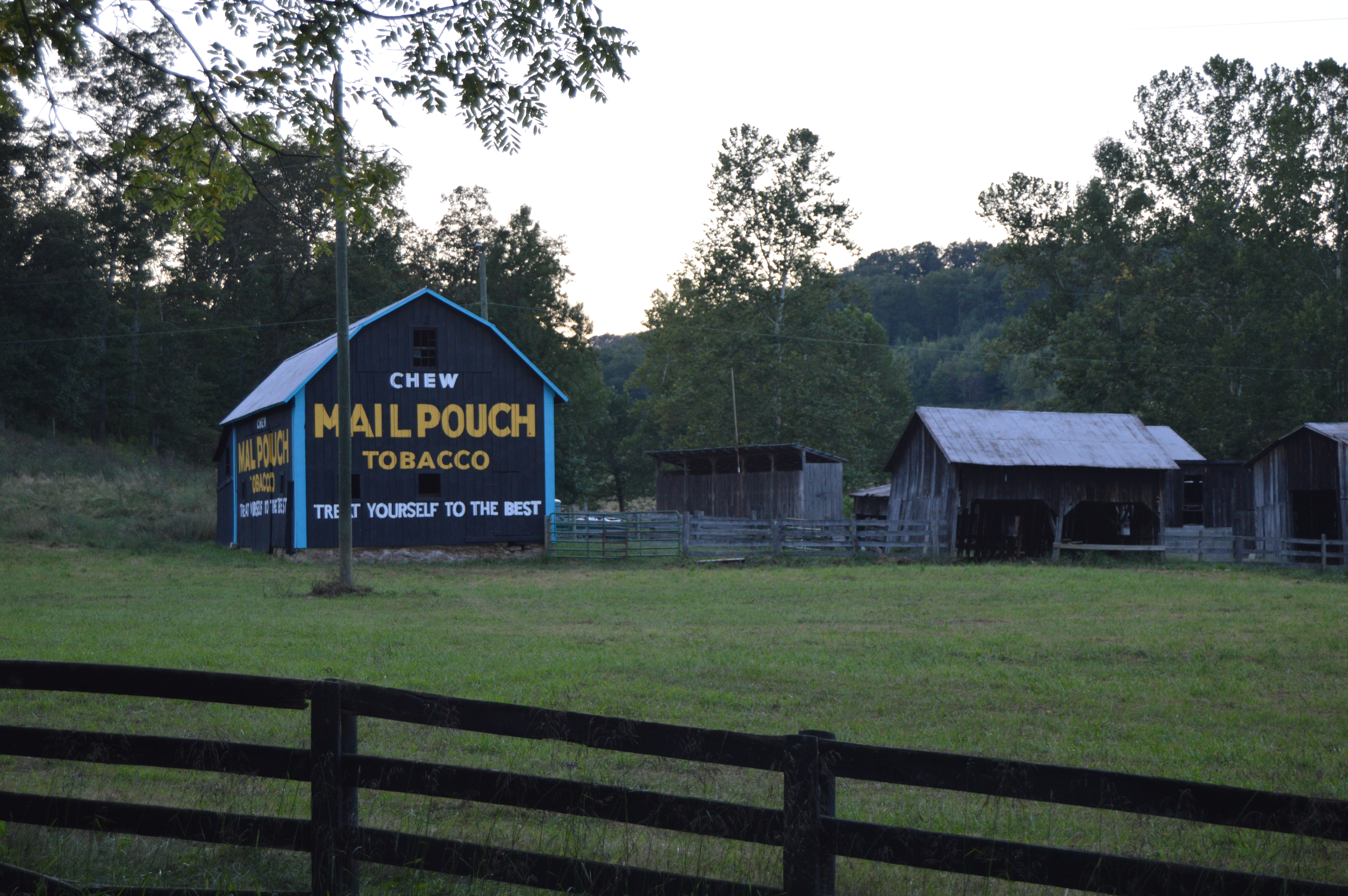
- Mail Pouch Tobacco Barn on State Route 73

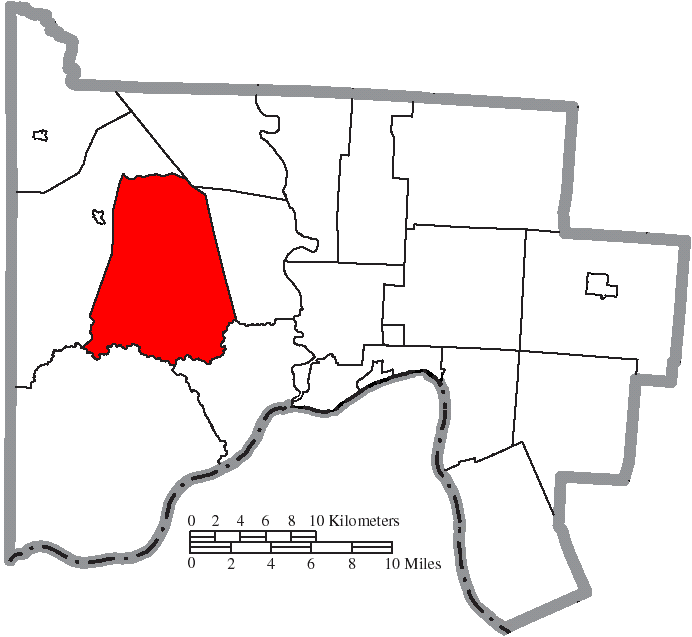
- Location of Union Township in Scioto County
- Coordinates: 38°50′3″N 83°7′44″W
- Country: United States
- State: Ohio
- County: Scioto

Area
  - Total: 50.1 sq mi (129.8 km^{2})
  - Land: 50.1 sq mi (129.8 km^{2})
  - Water: 0 sq mi (0.0 km^{2})
- Elevation: 764 ft (233 m)

Population (2020)
  - Total: 2,057
  - Density: 41.04/sq mi (15.85/km^{2})
- Time zone: UTC-5 (Eastern (EST))
  - Summer (DST): UTC-4 (EDT)
- FIPS code: 39-78554
- GNIS feature ID: 1086936

Union Township is one of the sixteen townships of Scioto County, Ohio, United States. The 2020 census counted 2,057 people in the township.

== Geography ==
Located in the western part of the county, it borders the following townships:

- Morgan Township - north
- Rush Township - northeast
- Washington Township - southeast
- Nile Township - south
- Brush Creek Township - west

No municipalities are located in Union Township.

== Name and history ==
It is one of twenty-seven Union Townships statewide.

Union Township was organized on August 9, 1803. It was named for the federal union.

In 1833, Union Township contained one forge and finery for making iron, three gristmills and four saw mills, one store, and one tannery.

== Government ==
The township is governed by a three-member board of trustees, who are elected in November of odd-numbered years to a four-year term beginning on the following January 1. Two are elected in the year after the presidential election and one is elected in the year before it. There is also an elected township fiscal officer, who serves a four-year term beginning on April 1 of the year after the election, which is held in November of the year before the presidential election. Vacancies in the fiscal officership or on the board of trustees are filled by the remaining trustees.
