= Pond Run, Ohio =

Unincorporated community in Ohio, U.S.

Coordinates: 38°39′49″N 83°07′36″W

Pond Run is an unincorporated community in Scioto County, in the U.S. state of Ohio.

== History ==
A post office called Pond Run was established in 1861, the name was changed to Pondrun in 1893, and the post office closed in 1913. The community takes its name from nearby Pond Run creek. Besides the post office, Pond Run had a schoolhouse.
