= Pinkerman, Ohio =

Unincorporated community in Ohio, U.S.

Coordinates: 38°50′18″N 82°46′11″W

Pinkerman is an unincorporated community in Scioto County, in the U.S. state of Ohio.

== History ==
A post office called Pinkerman was established in 1884, and remained in operation until 1904. Besides the post office, Pinkerman had a United Brethren church.
