= Lyra, Ohio =

Unincorporated community in Ohio, U.S.

Coordinates: 38°44′18″N 82°44′16″W

Lyra is an unincorporated community in Scioto County, in the U.S. state of Ohio.

== History ==
A post office called Lyra was in operation from 1850 until 1937. Besides the post office, Lyra had a church.
