= Mule Town, Ohio =

- Village
- Nickname: M-Town
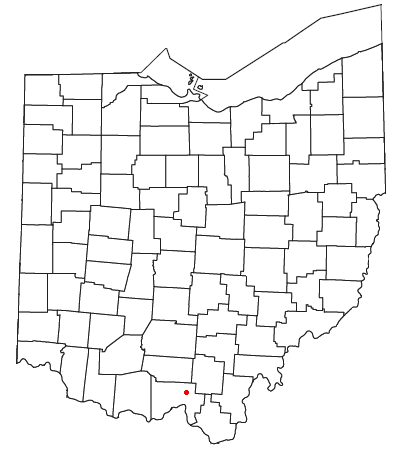
- Location of Mule Town, Ohio
- Coordinates: 38°52′00″N 82°51′48″W
- Country: United States
- State: Ohio
- County: Scioto

Government
  - Type: Part of a civil township
- Elevation: 653 ft (199 m)
- Time zone: UTC-5 (Eastern (EST))
  - Summer (DST): UTC-4 (EDT)
- ZIP codes: 45653
- Area code: 740
- GNIS feature ID: 1077273

Mule Town or Purdy Corners is an unincorporated community in southwestern Madison Township, Scioto County, Ohio, United States. Located at the intersection of State Route 335, Lucasville-Minford Road and Bennett Road, it lies just north of the unincorporated community of Minford, 7 miles (11½ km) east of the census-designated place of Lucasville, and 14 miles (23 km) northeast of the city of Portsmouth, the county seat of Scioto County. Sweet Run, a tributary of the Rocky Fork of the Little Scioto River, flows past the community.
