= Lombardsville, Ohio =

Unincorporated community in Ohio, U.S.

Coordinates: 38°49′15″N 83°07′59″W

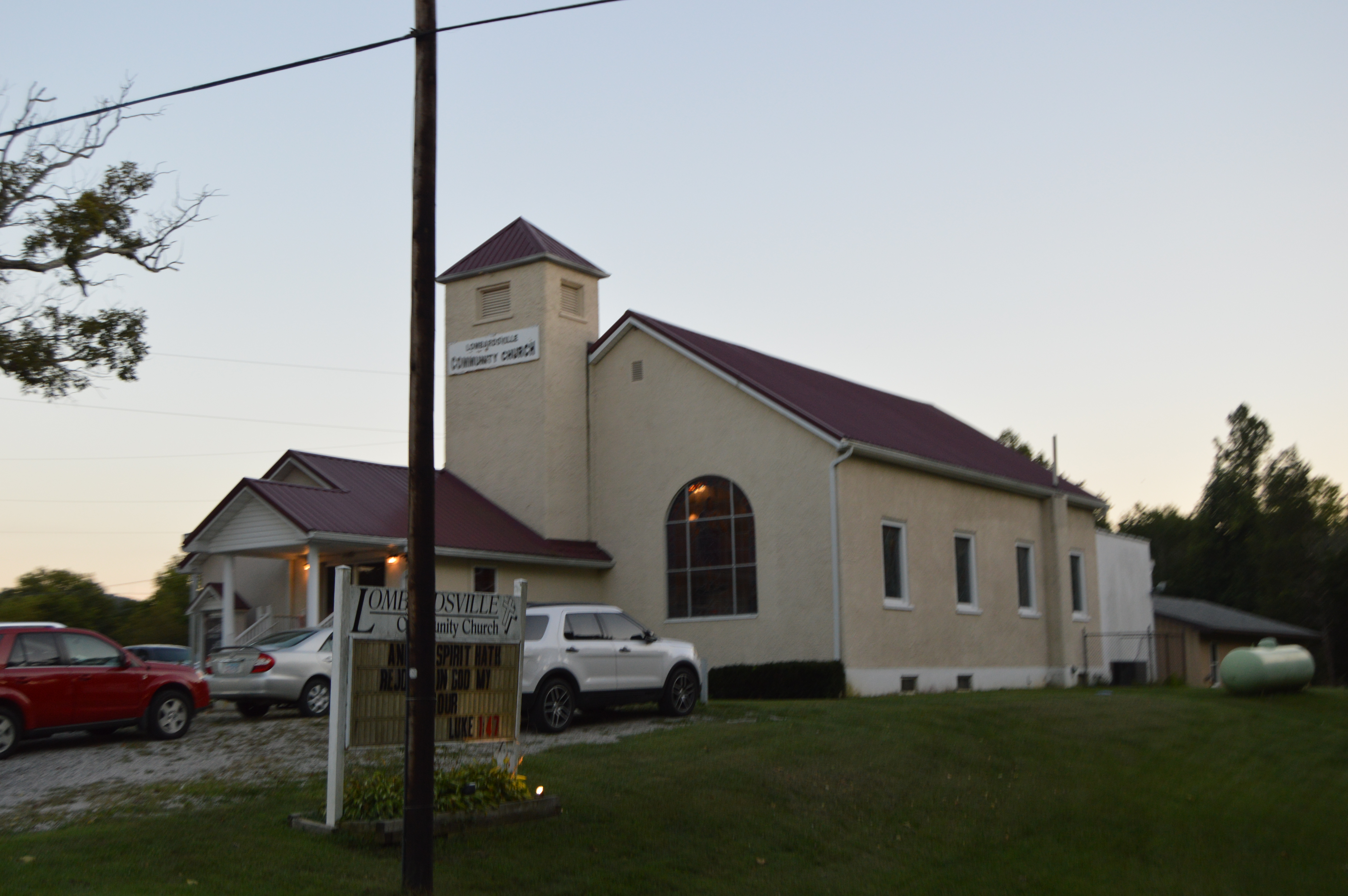
Lombardsville Community Church

Lombardsville is an unincorporated community in Scioto County, in the U.S. state of Ohio.

== History ==
A post office called Lombardville was established in 1868, and remained in operation until 1903. The community was named for Francis Lombard, a first settler.
