= Shawnee State Forest =

Protected forest in Ohio, United States

- IUCN category VI (protected area with sustainable use of natural resources)
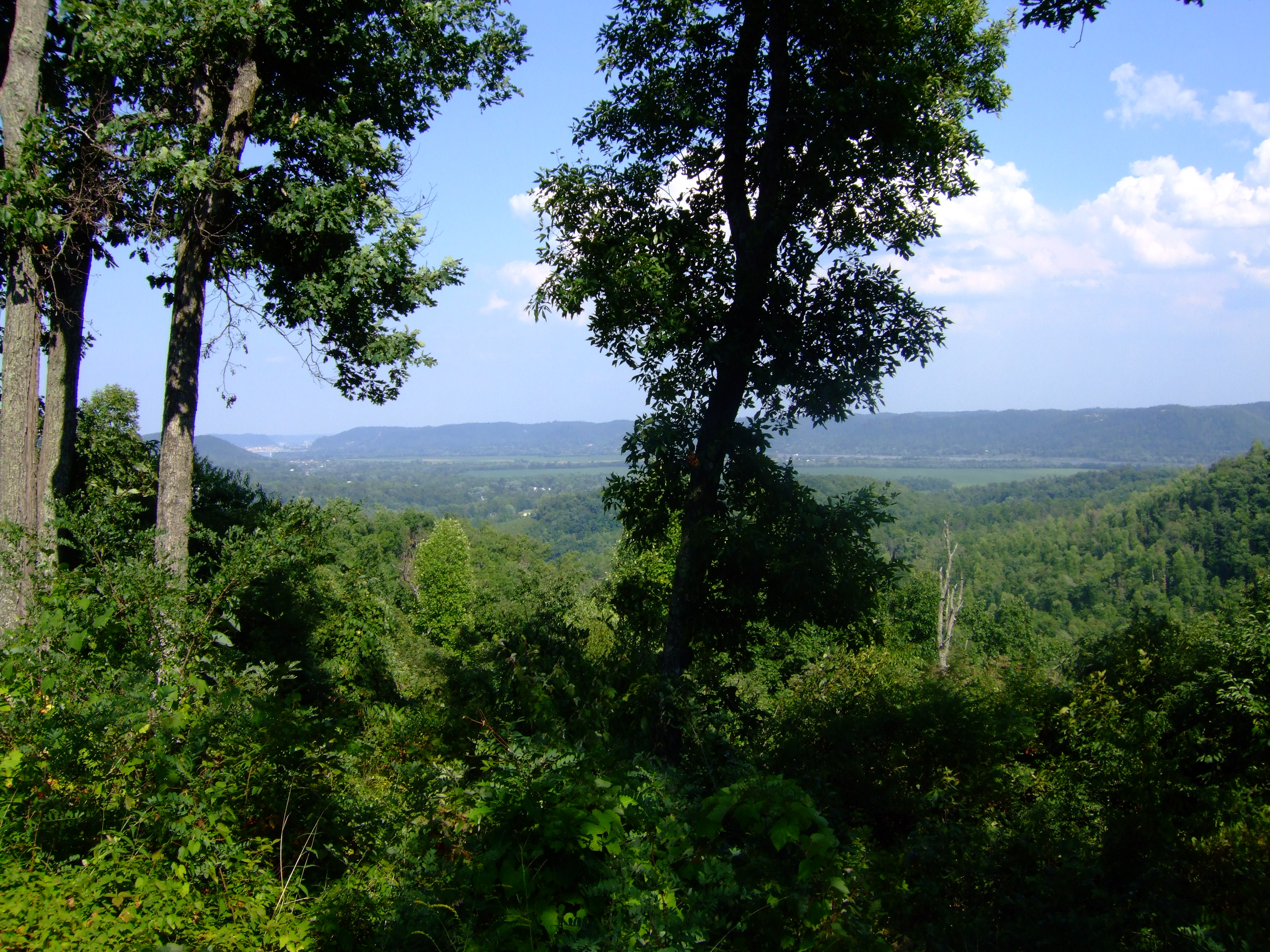
- View from Picnic Point in Shawnee State Forest
- Interactive map of Shawnee State Forest
- Location: Scioto, Ohio, United States
- Coordinates: 38°41′35.6″N 83°7′44.1″W
- Area: 63,747 acres (257.97 km^{2})
- Website: Shawnee State Forest

Shawnee State Forest, also known as "Ohio's Little Smokies", is a state forest in the U.S. state of Ohio. It is located in western Scioto County and eastern Adams County and encompasses 63,747 acres (25,797 ha) of woodland. It is the largest state forest in Ohio. As with many government owned forests, some parts of Shawnee are actively managed through logging and other activities. However, approximately 8,000 acres (3,200 ha) of the forest is designated as wilderness, with no roads or logging allowed. The Forest surrounds Shawnee State Park and contains inholdings as well.

== History ==
Shawnee State Forest was established in 1922 with the purchase of 5,000 acres of land that was previously cut over for timber. Before its establishment, during the mid-1800s to the early 1900s, building stone was quarried in the area. The stone was moved by railroad to the Ohio River, where it was loaded on barges. Most of the stone was used for the construction of buildings in Cincinnati. In the 1930s, seven Civilian Conservation Corps camps were located throughout the state forest. During this time, most of the roads were constructed, and five small lakes were built to serve as water supplies to the camps. The CCC Camps included four segregated African American camps—Camp Adams on Churn Creek; Camp Roosevelt and Camp Gordon on Turkey Creek; and Shawnee No. 2, which was located in the headwaters of Pond Creek, at the intersection of State Forest Road 1 and State Forest Road 4.
