= Shawnee State Park (Ohio) =

State park in Scioto County, Ohio, USA

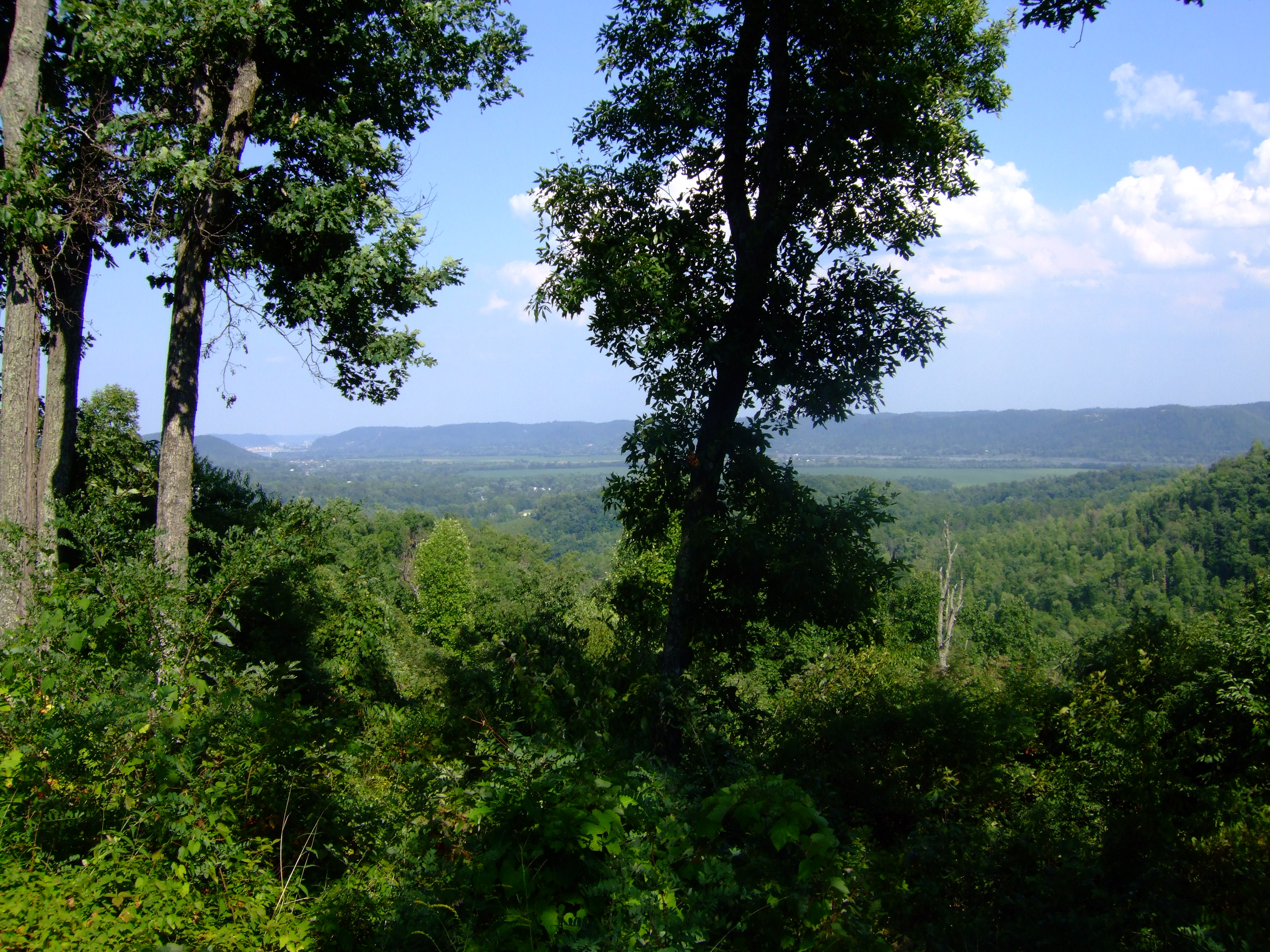
- View from Picnic Point

- Location within Ohio Location within the United States
- Location: Scioto County, Ohio, United States
- Nearest city: Portsmouth, Ohio
- Coordinates: 38°44′05″N 83°11′54″W
- Area: 1,095 acres (443 ha)
- Elevation: 892 feet (272 m)
- Established: 1922
- Administrator: Ohio Department of Natural Resources
- Designation: Ohio state park
- Website: Shawnee State Park

Shawnee State Park is a 1,095-acre (443 ha) public recreation area surrounded by the 63,000-acre (25,000 ha) Shawnee State Forest in Scioto County, Ohio, United States. The park is in the foothills of the Appalachian Mountains near the Ohio River in Southern Ohio on State Route 125, just north of Friendship.

== History ==
The area was once a hunting ground for the Shawnee people. The park was first opened in 1922 as Theodore Roosevelt State Game Preserve. The game preserve saw further development and improvements by the Civilian Conservation Corps in the 1930s. The area became a state park and forest following creation of the Ohio Department of Natural Resources and the Division of Parks and Recreation in 1949. The lodge opened January 14th, 1973.

== Activities and amenities ==
The park's recreational activities include golf, fishing, swimming, hiking, and boating on Roosevelt Lake and Turkey Creek Lake. The state park marina on the Ohio River is located on US 52 just west of Friendship. The park's golf course was closed in 2019.

== Gallery ==
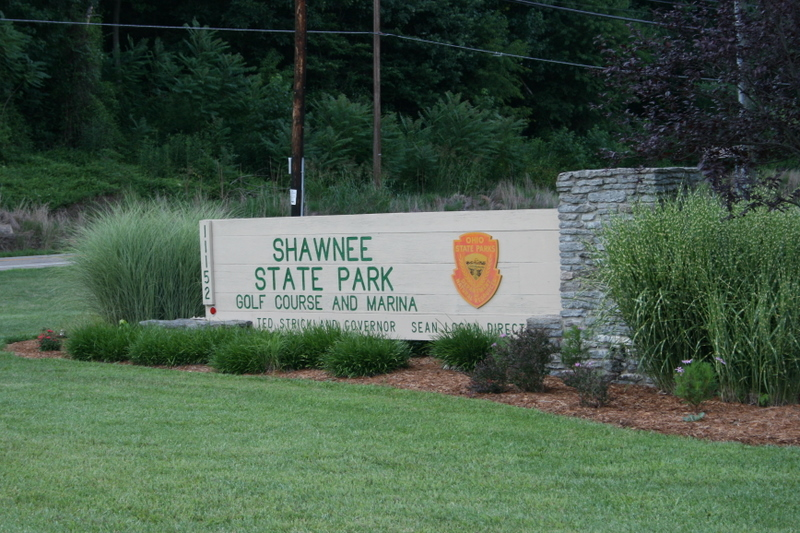
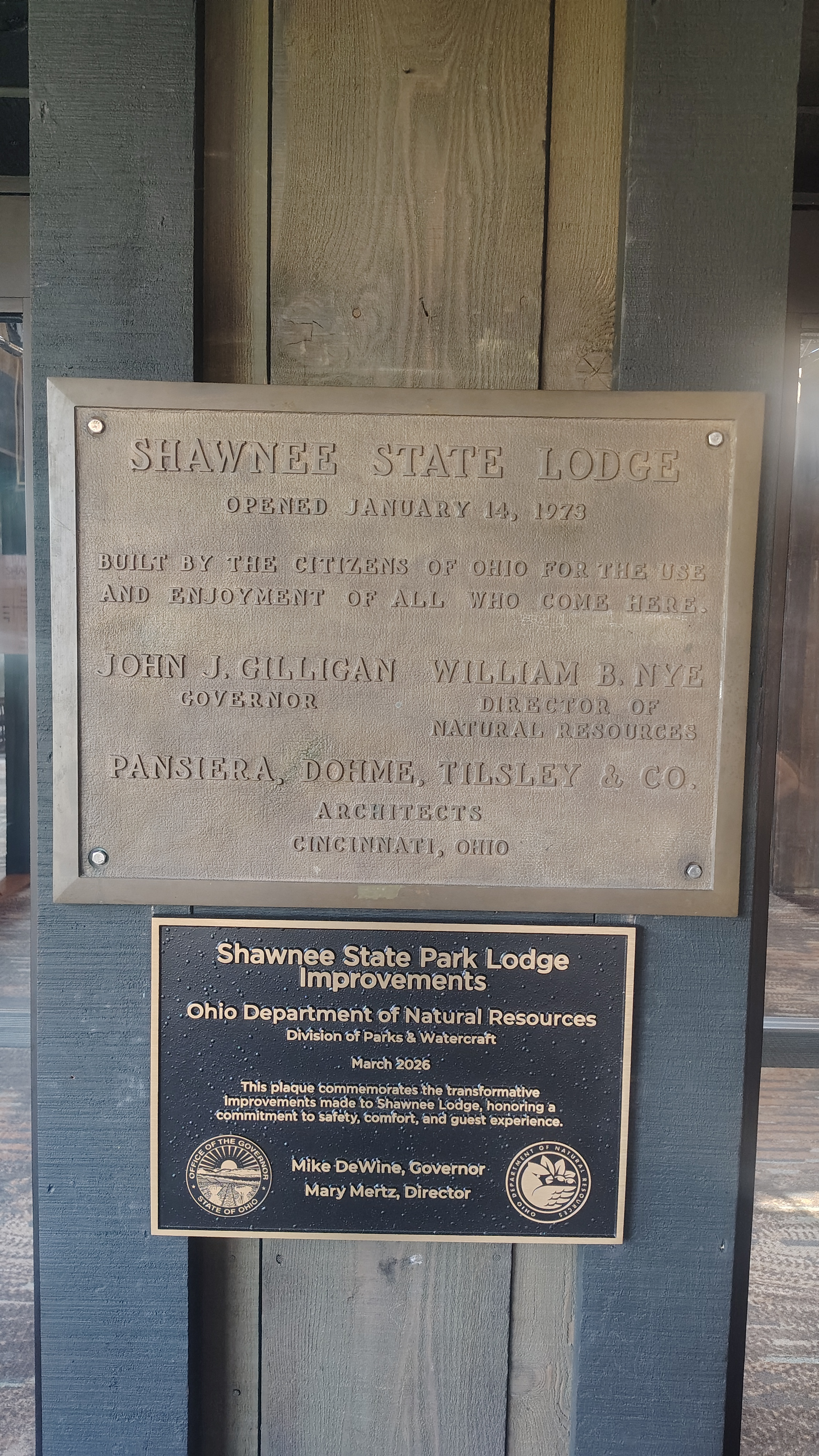
Plaque on the main entrance of the Shawnee State Park Lodge.
Marina Entrance Sign (with U.S. 52 in the background)

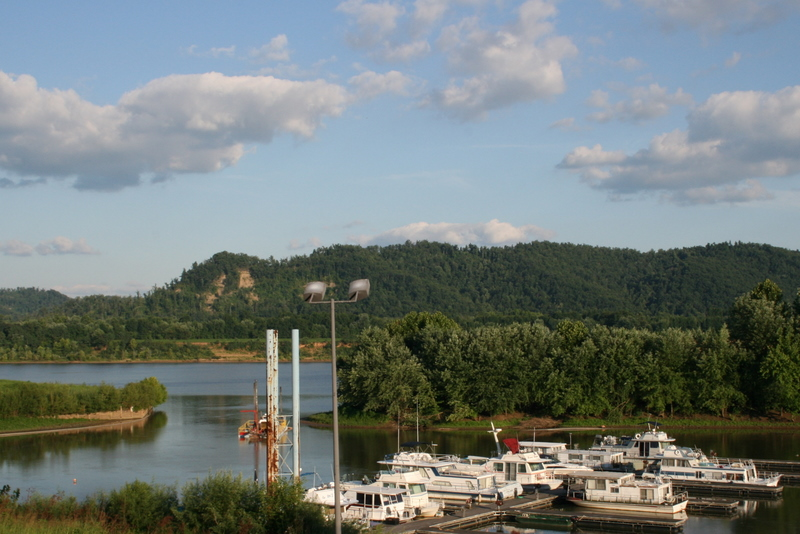
A view of the marina and the Ohio River from the park's parking lot

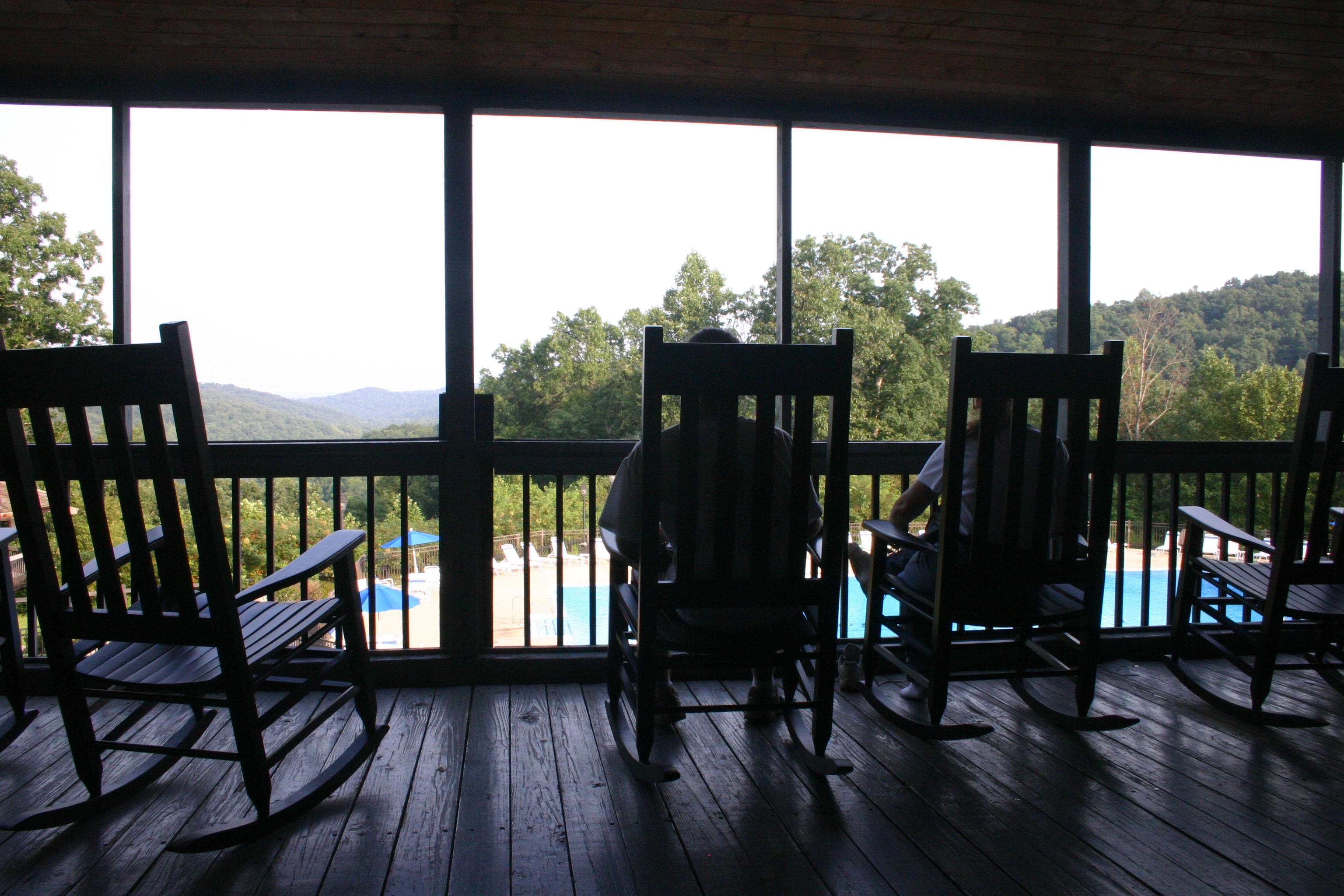
Back porch rockers at the park lodge

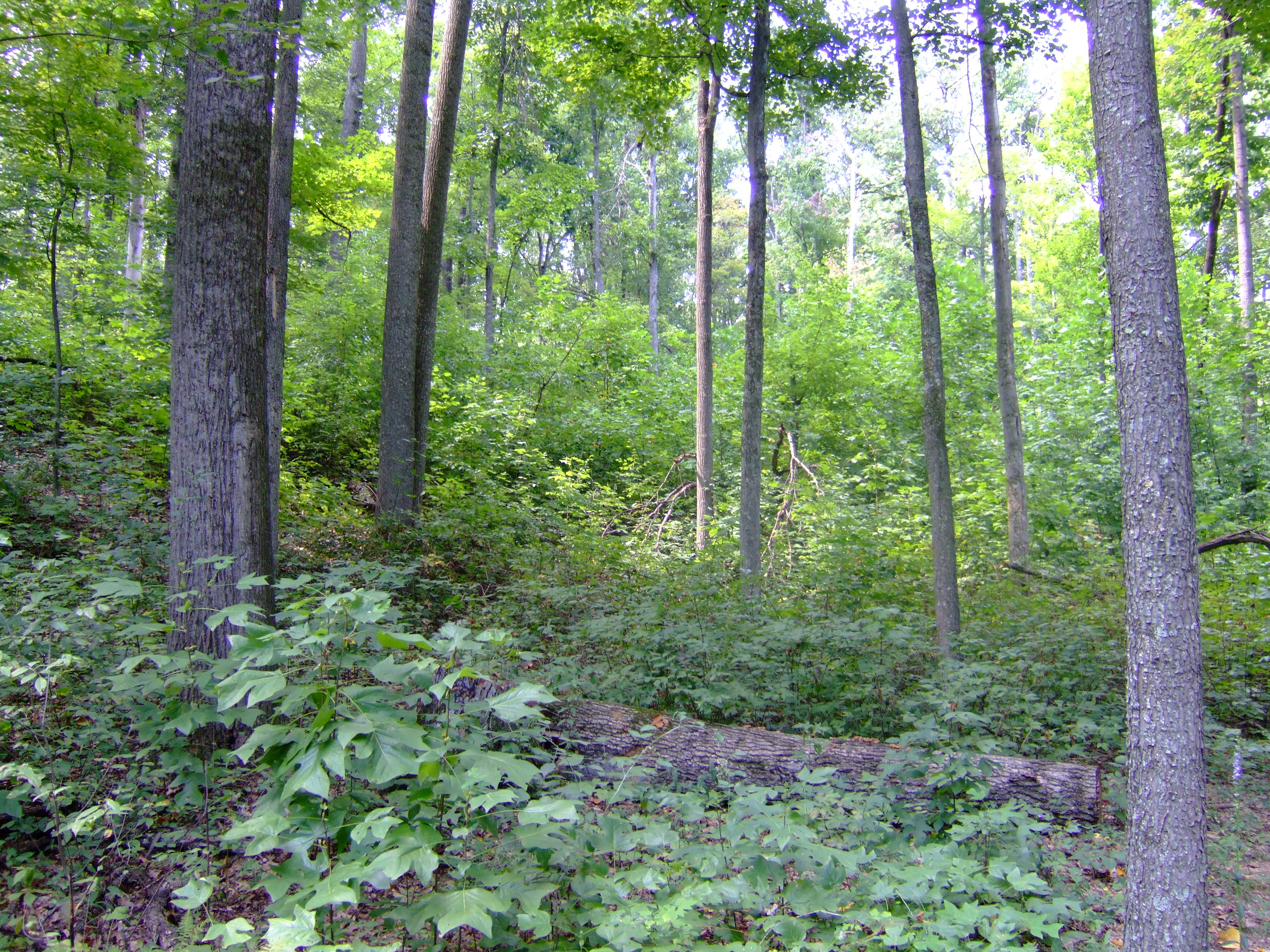
View of second growth forest from a hiking trail in the park
