= Otway, Ohio =

- Village
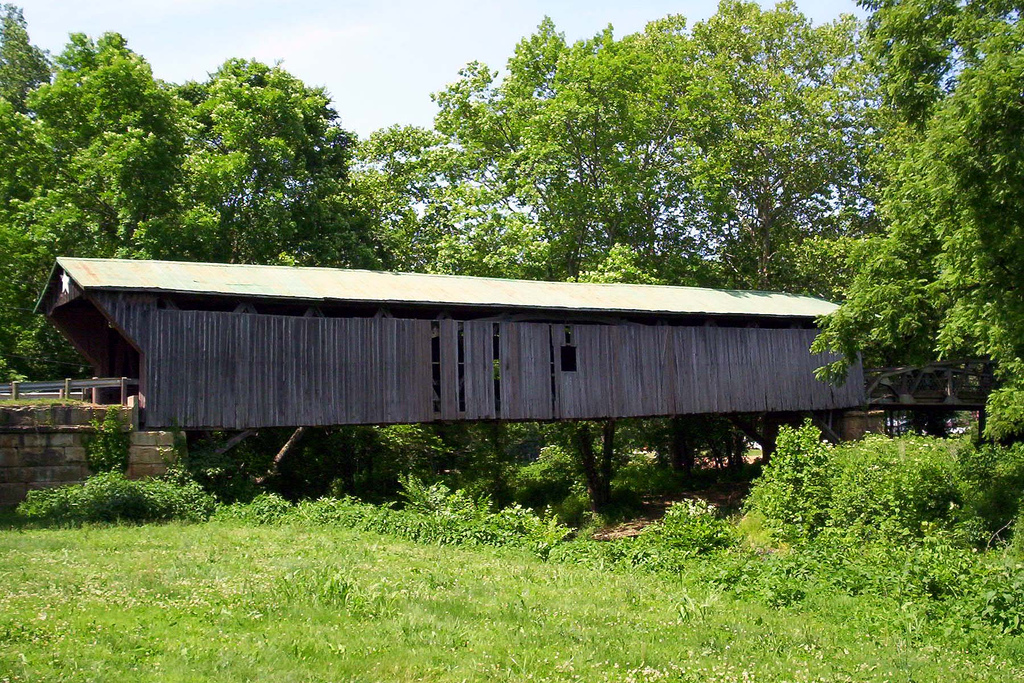
- Otway Covered Bridge

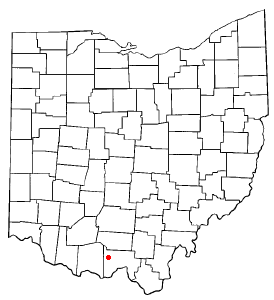
- Location of Otway, Ohio

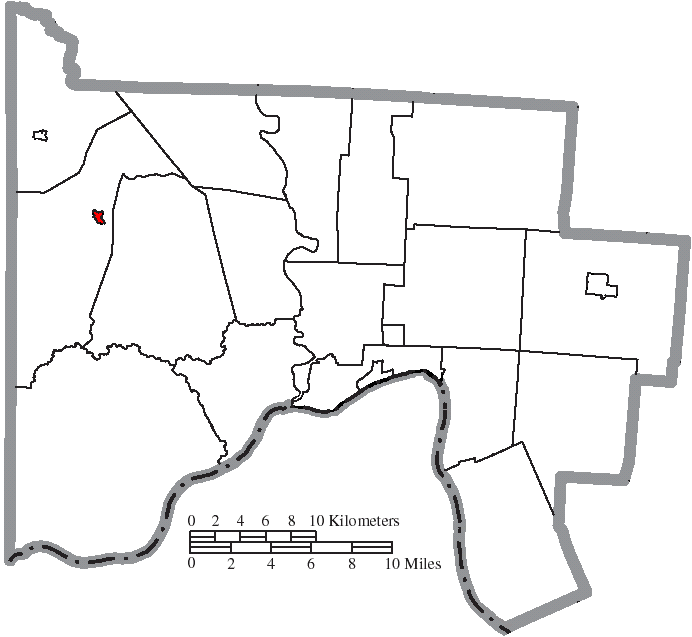
- Location of Otway in Scioto County
- Coordinates: 38°51′54″N 83°11′17″W
- Country: United States
- State: Ohio
- County: Scioto

Area
  - Total: 0.18 sq mi (0.46 km^{2})
  - Land: 0.17 sq mi (0.45 km^{2})
  - Water: 0.0039 sq mi (0.01 km^{2})
- Elevation: 591 ft (180 m)

Population (2020)
  - Total: 92
  - Estimate (2024): 89
  - Density: 525.8/sq mi (203.03/km^{2})
- Time zone: UTC-5 (Eastern (EST))
  - Summer (DST): UTC-4 (EDT)
- ZIP code: 45657
- Area code: 740
- FIPS code: 39-59066
- GNIS feature ID: 2399599

Otway is a village in Scioto County, Ohio, United States. The population was 92 at the 2020 census.

== History ==
A post office called Otway has been in operation since 1861. The town site was platted on March 29, 1884. The village was named after Thomas Otway, an English dramatist. Otway was incorporated in 1890.

Trains traveling from Portsmouth to Cincinnati would stop at the Norfolk & Western train depot located in Otway. In 1956, the depot was moved across the tracks and converted into a convenience store as roads were used more and more for travel instead of trains.

On March 2, 2012, a tornado with winds upwards of 75 mph, swept through southern Ohio. Otway's fire department building, along with two houses, were damaged. Also damaged was one of Otway's emergency response vehicles, but through a donation from the Uniopolis Fire Department, the vehicle was quickly replaced with a 1983 pumper tanker truck.

== Geography ==
According to the United States Census Bureau, the village has a total area of 0.20 square miles (0.52 km^{2}), all land.

== Demographics ==
Historical population
| Census | Pop. | Note | %± |
|---|---|---|---|
| 1900 | 274 | | — |
| 1910 | 234 | | −14.6% |
| 1920 | 289 | | 23.5% |
| 1930 | 265 | | −8.3% |
| 1940 | 235 | | −11.3% |
| 1950 | 229 | | −2.6% |
| 1960 | 235 | | 2.6% |
| 1970 | 177 | | −24.7% |
| 1980 | 161 | | −9.0% |
| 1990 | 105 | | −34.8% |
| 2000 | 86 | | −18.1% |
| 2010 | 87 | | 1.2% |
| 2020 | 92 | | 5.7% |
U.S. Decennial Census

=== 2010 census ===
As of the census of 2010, there were 87 people, 39 households, and 26 families living in the village. The population density was 435.0 inhabitants per square mile (168.0/km^{2}). There were 52 housing units at an average density of 260.0 per square mile (100.4/km^{2}). The racial makeup of the village was 94.3% White, 3.4% Native American, and 2.3% from two or more races.

There were 39 households, of which 28.2% had children under the age of 18 living with them, 48.7% were married couples living together, 12.8% had a female householder with no husband present, 5.1% had a male householder with no wife present, and 33.3% were non-families. 28.2% of all households were made up of individuals, and 15.4% had someone living alone who was 65 years of age or older. The average household size was 2.23 and the average family size was 2.69.

The median age in the village was 40.5 years. 18.4% of residents were under the age of 18; 8% were between the ages of 18 and 24; 25.2% were from 25 to 44; 28.6% were from 45 to 64; and 19.5% were 65 years of age or older. The gender makeup of the village was 40.2% male and 59.8% female.

=== 2000 census ===
As of the census of 2000, there were 86 people, 40 households, and 26 families living in the village. The population density was 388.1 inhabitants per square mile (149.8/km^{2}). There were 59 housing units at an average density of 266.2 per square mile (102.8/km^{2}). The racial makeup of the village was 96.51% White, 1.16% Native American, 2.33% from other races. Hispanic or Latino of any race were 2.33% of the population.

There were 40 households, out of which 17.5% had children under the age of 18 living with them, 47.5% were married couples living together, 12.5% had a female householder with no husband present, and 35.0% were non-families. 35.0% of all households were made up of individuals, and 20.0% had someone living alone who was 65 years of age or older. The average household size was 2.15 and the average family size was 2.77.

In the village, the population was spread out, with 16.3% under the age of 18, 14.0% from 18 to 24, 23.3% from 25 to 44, 20.9% from 45 to 64, and 25.6% who were 65 years of age or older. The median age was 44 years. For every 100 females there were 79.2 males. For every 100 females age 18 and over, there were 75.6 males.

The median income for a household in the village was $27,500, and the median income for a family was $35,000. Males had a median income of $32,500 versus $25,625 for females. The per capita income for the village was $12,966. There were 11.5% of families and 14.1% of the population living below the poverty line, including 21.1% of under eighteens and 15.8% of those over 64.
