= Scioto County, Ohio =

County in Ohio, United States

- County
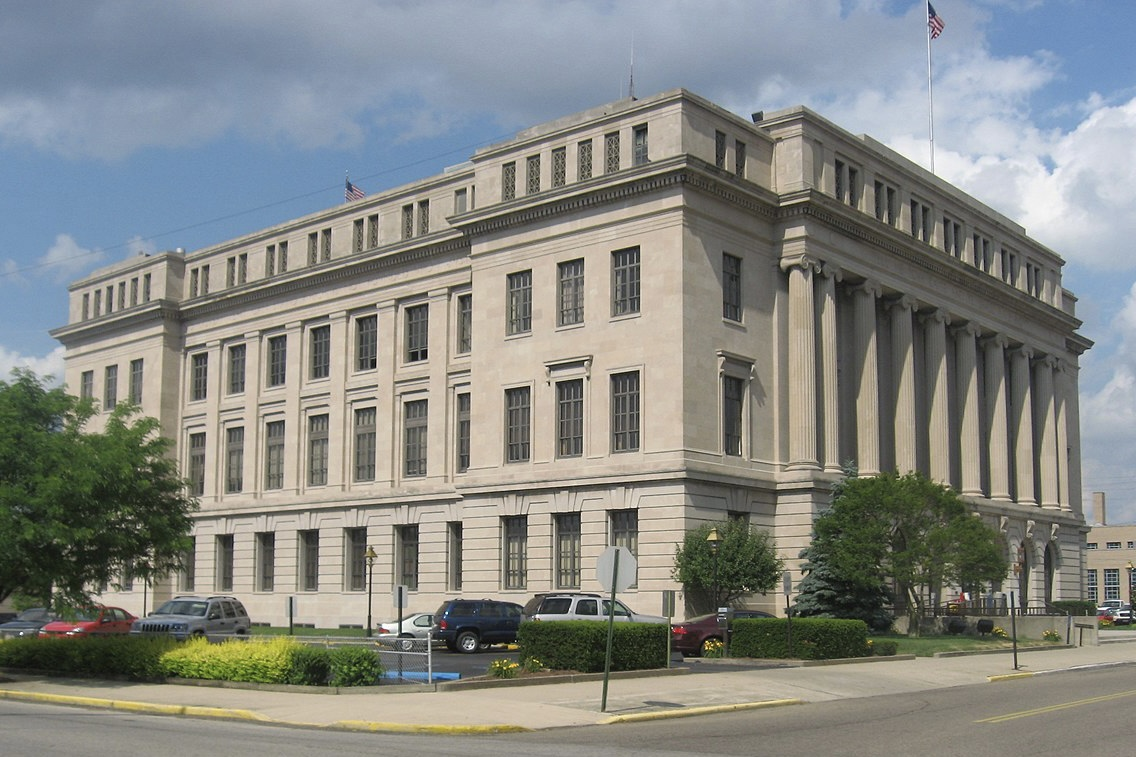
- Scioto County Courthouse

- Flag Seal

- Location within the U.S. state of Ohio
- Coordinates: 38°49′N 82°59′W
- Country: United States
- State: Ohio
- Founded: March 24, 1803
- Named for: Scioto River
- Seat: Portsmouth
- Largest city: Portsmouth

Area
  - Total: 616 sq mi (1,600 km^{2})
  - Land: 610 sq mi (1,600 km^{2})
  - Water: 5.9 sq mi (15 km^{2}) 1.0%

Population (2020)
  - Total: 74,008
  - Estimate (2025): 71,365 ▼
  - Density: 120/sq mi (46/km^{2})
- Time zone: UTC−5 (Eastern)
  - Summer (DST): UTC−4 (EDT)
- Congressional district: 2nd
- Website: www.sciotocountyoh.com

Scioto County (/saɪˈoʊtə/ sy-OH-tə) is a county along the Ohio River in the south-central part of the U.S. state of Ohio. At the 2020 census, the population was 74,008. Its county seat is Portsmouth. The county was founded on March 24, 1804, from Adams County and is named for a Native American word referring to deer or deer-hunting. Scioto County comprises the Portsmouth, OH Micropolitan Statistical Area. It is at the confluence of the Scioto and Ohio rivers.

== Geography ==
According to the U.S. Census Bureau, the county has an area of 616 square miles (1,600 km^{2}), of which 610 square miles (1,600 km^{2}) is land and 5.9 square miles (15 km^{2}) (1.0%) is water. Many parts of Scioto County are heavily forested, especially in the western half of the county with Shawnee State Park.

=== Adjacent counties ===
- Adams County (west)
- Pike County (north)
- Jackson County (northeast)
- Lawrence County (southeast)
- Greenup County, Kentucky (south)
- Lewis County, Kentucky (southwest)

=== National protected area ===
- Wayne National Forest (part)

=== Other parks ===
Shawnee State Forest and Park, the state's largest with over 63,000 acres (250 km^{2}), covers most of western Scioto County, and Brush Creek State Forest touches part of northwestern Scioto County. The county also has numerous parks and recreational areas in each of its townships, including Earl Thomas Conley Park on U.S. 52 west of Portsmouth. Public lands in the county also include the Wayne National Forest on the Ironton Ranger District. The 241,000-acre (980 km^{2}) forest encompasses almost 12,000 acres (49 km^{2}) in three townships in Scioto County (Vernon 6,793.50 acres (27.4923 km^{2}), Green township 81,695 acres (330.61 km^{2}), and Bloom 4,008.29 acres).

Within the city limits of Portsmouth, there are 14 parks for the residents and for community use. These parks are Alexandria Park (Ohio and Scioto River confluence), Allard Park (Bonser Avenue in Sciotoville), Bannon Park (near Farley Square), Branch Rickey Park (on Williams Street near levee), Buckeye Park (near Branch Rickey Park), Cyndee Secrest Park (Sciotoville), Dr. Hartlage Park (Rose Street in Sciotoville), Labold Park (near Spartan Stadium), Larry Hisle Park (23rd Street and Thomas Avenue), Mound Park (17th and Hutchins Streets), York Park (riverfront), Spartan Stadium, Tracy Park (Chillicothe and Gay Streets), and Weghorst Park (Fourth and Jefferson Streets).

== Demographics ==
Historical population
Census	Pop.	Note	%±
1810	3,399		—
1820	5,750		69.2%
1830	8,740		52.0%
1840	11,192		28.1%
1850	18,428		64.7%
1860	24,297		31.8%
1870	29,302		20.6%
1880	33,511		14.4%
1890	35,377		5.6%
1900	40,981		15.8%
1910	48,463		18.3%
1920	62,850		29.7%
1930	81,221		29.2%
1940	86,565		6.6%
1950	82,910		−4.2%
1960	84,216		1.6%
1970	76,951		−8.6%
1980	84,545		9.9%
1990	80,327		−5.0%
2000	79,195		−1.4%
2010	79,499		0.4%
2020	74,008		−6.9%
2025 (est.)	71,365	▼	−3.6%
U.S. Decennial Census; 1790-1960 1900-1990; 1990-2000 2020

=== 2020 census ===
As of the 2020 census, the county had a population of 74,008 and a median age of 41.2 years; 21.5% of residents were under the age of 18 and 18.9% were 65 years of age or older, while there were 97.2 males for every 100 females and 95.6 males for every 100 females age 18 and over.

The racial makeup of the county was 91.8% White, 2.8% Black or African American, 0.4% American Indian and Alaska Native, 0.4% Asian, <0.1% Native Hawaiian and Pacific Islander, 0.7% from some other race, and 4.0% from two or more races. Hispanic or Latino residents of any race comprised 1.4% of the population.

44.7% of residents lived in urban areas, while 55.3% lived in rural areas.

There were 29,612 households in the county, of which 28.1% had children under the age of 18 living in them. Of all households, 44.5% were married-couple households, 18.9% were households with a male householder and no spouse or partner present, and 29.5% were households with a female householder and no spouse or partner present. About 30.5% of all households were made up of individuals and 13.9% had someone living alone who was 65 years of age or older.

There were 33,108 housing units, of which 10.6% were vacant. Among occupied housing units, 66.3% were owner-occupied and 33.7% were renter-occupied. The homeowner vacancy rate was 1.7% and the rental vacancy rate was 7.0%.

=== Racial and ethnic composition ===
Scioto County, Ohio – Racial and ethnic composition Note: the US Census treats Hispanic/Latino as an ethnic category. This table excludes Latinos from the racial categories and assigns them to a separate category. Hispanics/Latinos may be of any race.
Race / ethnicity (NH = Non-Hispanic)	Pop 1980	Pop 1990	Pop 2000	Pop 2010	Pop 2020	% 1980	% 1990	% 2000	% 2010	% 2020
White alone (NH)	81,461	77,074	74,859	74,531	67,531	96.35%	95.95%	94.52%	93.75%	91.25%
Black or African American alone (NH)	2,371	2,447	2,147	2,107	2,038	2.80%	3.05%	2.71%	2.65%	2.75%
Native American or Alaska Native alone (NH)	113	403	467	395	254	0.13%	0.50%	0.59%	0.50%	0.34%
Asian alone (NH)	147	124	189	248	274	0.17%	0.15%	0.24%	0.31%	0.37%
Native Hawaiian or Pacific Islander alone (NH)	x	x	15	10	9	x	x	0.02%	0.01%	0.01%
Other race alone (NH)	31	18	49	59	210	0.04%	0.02%	0.06%	0.07%	0.28%
Mixed race or Multiracial (NH)	x	x	992	1,261	2,640	x	x	1.25%	1.59%	3.57%
Hispanic or Latino (any race)	422	261	477	888	1,052	0.50%	0.32%	0.60%	1.12%	1.42%
Total	84,545	80,327	79,195	79,499	74,008	100.00%	100.00%	100.00%	100.00%	100.00%

=== 2010 census ===
At the 2010 United States census, 79,499 people, 30,870 households, and 20,911 families resided in the county. The population density was 130.3 per square mile (50.3/km^{2}). There were 34,142 housing units at an average density of 56.0 per square mile (21.6/km^{2}). The county's racial makeup was 94.4% white, 2.7% black or African American, 0.5% American Indian, 0.3% Asian, 0.3% from other races, and 1.7% from two or more races. Those of Hispanic or Latino origin made up 1.1% of the population. In terms of ancestry, 22.9% were German, 15.0% were Irish, 12.1% were American, and 10.1% were English.

Of the 30,870 households, 32.2% had children under 18 living with them, 48.8% were married couples living together, 13.7% had a female householder with no husband present, 32.3% were non-families and 27.4% were made up of individuals. The average household size was 2.46 and the average family size was 2.96. The median age was 38.8.

The median household income was $32,812 and the median family income was $44,122. Males had a median income of $40,876 and females $29,675. The per capita income was $17,778. About 16.4% of families and 20.8% of the population were below the poverty line, including 28.4% of those under 18 and 11.8% of those 65 or over.

=== 2000 census ===
At the 2000 census, 79,195 people, 30,871 households, and 21,362 families resided in the county. The population density was 129 per square mile (50/km^{2}). There were 34,054 housing units at an average density of 56 per square mile (22/km^{2}). The county's racial makeup was 94.88% White, 2.73% Black or African American, 0.63% Native American, 0.24% Asian, 0.02% Pacific Islander, 0.18% from other races, and 1.31% from two or more races. 0.60% of the population were Hispanic or Latino of any race.

There were 30,837 households, of which 32.2% had children under 18 living with them, 53.2% were married couples living together, 12.7% had a female householder with no husband present and 30.40% were non-families. 26.90% of all households were made up of single individuals and 12.80% had someone living alone who was 65 or older. The average household size was 2.46 and the average family size was 2.97.

24.40% of the population were under the age of 18, 9.60% from 18 to 24, 28.30% from 25 to 44, 22.70% from 45 to 64, and 14.90% were 65 or older. The median age was 37. For every 100 females, there were 95.3 males. For every 100 females 18 and over, there were 91.2 males.

The median household income was $28,008 and the median family income was $34,691. Males had a median income of $32,063 and females $21,562. The per capita income was $15,408. About 15.2% of families and 19.3% of the population were below the poverty line, including 25.4% of those under 18 and 12.8% of those 65 or over.

== Politics ==
The county was recently a swing county, as most presidential elections before 2016 were won by close margins. Additionally, it voted for the nationwide winner in each election between 1964 and 2004. Donald Trump won 66% of the county's vote in 2016, 71% in 2020, and 74% in 2024.

United States presidential election results for Scioto County, Ohio
Year	Republican		Democratic		Third party(ies)	
Year	No.	%	No.	%	No.	%
1856	546	15.60%	1,634	46.67%	1,321	37.73%
1860	2,186	50.51%	1,750	40.43%	392	9.06%
1864	2,806	57.78%	2,050	42.22%	0	0.00%
1868	2,904	57.00%	2,191	43.00%	0	0.00%
1872	2,888	57.53%	2,091	41.65%	41	0.82%
1876	3,359	52.55%	3,025	47.32%	8	0.13%
1880	3,639	55.03%	2,912	44.03%	62	0.94%
1884	4,155	57.45%	2,990	41.34%	88	1.22%
1888	4,070	55.02%	3,075	41.57%	252	3.41%
1892	4,268	55.87%	3,181	41.64%	190	2.49%
1896	5,492	59.44%	3,658	39.59%	90	0.97%
1900	5,756	60.15%	3,629	37.92%	185	1.93%
1904	5,540	62.56%	2,420	27.33%	895	10.11%
1908	5,790	53.52%	4,310	39.84%	718	6.64%
1912	3,609	34.22%	3,508	33.26%	3,430	32.52%
1916	6,356	53.82%	4,808	40.71%	645	5.46%
1920	11,871	58.96%	7,682	38.15%	582	2.89%
1924	12,189	62.83%	5,532	28.51%	1,680	8.66%
1928	20,997	73.60%	7,425	26.03%	108	0.38%
1932	17,225	51.28%	15,817	47.09%	548	1.63%
1936	17,860	44.23%	22,243	55.08%	277	0.69%
1940	19,462	47.02%	21,926	52.98%	0	0.00%
1944	17,489	50.51%	17,134	49.49%	0	0.00%
1948	16,800	48.20%	17,923	51.43%	129	0.37%
1952	20,403	52.93%	18,145	47.07%	0	0.00%
1956	22,110	59.60%	14,985	40.40%	0	0.00%
1960	21,771	56.67%	16,647	43.33%	0	0.00%
1964	13,465	38.45%	21,559	61.55%	0	0.00%
1968	15,310	47.37%	13,836	42.81%	3,171	9.81%
1972	19,998	63.13%	11,008	34.75%	673	2.12%
1976	13,021	41.35%	18,019	57.22%	448	1.42%
1980	15,881	48.76%	15,552	47.75%	1,135	3.49%
1984	18,818	56.65%	14,120	42.51%	281	0.85%
1988	16,029	52.11%	14,442	46.95%	289	0.94%
1992	11,931	35.48%	14,715	43.76%	6,978	20.75%
1996	11,679	37.28%	15,041	48.01%	4,608	14.71%
2000	15,022	50.17%	13,997	46.74%	926	3.09%
2004	18,259	51.87%	16,827	47.80%	117	0.33%
2008	16,994	51.93%	14,926	45.61%	803	2.45%
2012	15,492	49.56%	15,077	48.23%	693	2.22%
2016	20,550	66.28%	9,132	29.46%	1,321	4.26%
2020	22,609	70.54%	9,080	28.33%	362	1.13%
2024	22,978	73.59%	8,021	25.69%	226	0.72%

United States Senate election results for Scioto County, Ohio1
Year	Republican		Democratic		Third party(ies)	
Year	No.	%	No.	%	No.	%
2024	20,509	67.20%	8,935	29.28%	1,075	3.52%

== Government ==
Portsmouth is Scioto County's county seat. The county courthouse is at the corner of Sixth and Court streets. It was designed by John Scudder Adkins and constructed in 1936 as a public works project. The county jail, once in the courthouse, is now in a new facility at the site of the former Norfolk and Western rail depot, near U.S. 23. It was constructed in 2006.

The current Scioto County Commissioners are Will Mault, Merit Smith, and Scottie Powell.

The current Scioto County Recorder is Gary Jenkins, a Republican.

Scioto County is the site of the state's Southern Ohio Correctional Facility, in Lucasville. It is Ohio's only maximum security prison and the site of Ohio's death house, where death row inmates are executed.

The county maintenance garage is also in Lucasville.

== Economy ==
Scioto County's economy has been strongly based on that of Portsmouth after heavy industry replaced agriculture and river trade as most important. Through the early 20th century and until the 1970s, heavy industry such as steel mills and shoe factories drove the county's economy. Since these factories closed, Scioto County has lost jobs and revenue.

In the early 21st century, the service industry and healthcare, such as the Southern Ohio Medical Center (SOMC), is the county's largest employer. Scioto County is home to Ohio's newest state university, Shawnee State University, which enrolls between 3,300 and 4,000 students and grants associate, baccalaureate and master's degrees. Much of the recent economic growth and change in the county is related to SOMC and Shawnee State University. Recently Infra-Metals announced the development of a new steel shipping/fabrication site in New Boston, Ohio in the Bob Walton Industrial Park. The plant is under construction and will have access to both barge and rail loading facilities.

In November 2002, the Portsmouth Uranium Enrichment Plant in nearby Piketon was recognized as an ANS Nuclear Historic Landmark by the American Nuclear Society. It had served a military function from 1952 until the mid-1960s, when the mission changed from enriching uranium for nuclear weapons to producing fuel for commercial nuclear power plants. The Portsmouth Uranium Enrichment Plant ended enriching operations in 2001. It began to support operational and administrative functions and perform external contract work. All uranium enrichment in the area has been taken over by a sister plant in Paducah, Kentucky. Uranium enrichment functions had been shared by the two plants. USEC interests in the area remain strong, and the American Centrifuge Plant was constructed in the first decade of the 21st century in Piketon. This commercial uranium enrichment facility was expected to employ up to 500 people and reach an initial annual production level of 3.5 million SWU by 2010.

Scioto County has also been the benefactor of Suncoke (coke (fuel) production). Sole Choice, Inc., the world's largest manufacturer of shoelaces, is in the county. Graf Brothers Flooring and Lumber, the world's largest manufacturer of rift and quartered oak products, has two satellite log yards in the county. Its main office is across the river in South Shore, Kentucky.

== Education ==
=== Colleges and universities ===
The Ohio University Southern Campus was in Scioto County until the early 1980s, when it relocated to Lawrence County (Ironton). Shawnee State Community College used the former Ohio University buildings. The curriculum and facilities were developed to a full four-year undergraduate program and graduate studies, being established in 1986 as Shawnee State University from the former Scioto County Technical College, Ohio's 13th and newest higher education institution.

=== K–12 schools ===
Scioto County has ten public school districts, one career technical center, one private school system, one charter school system, and several Christian schools. These districts include Bloom-Vernon (South Webster), Clay, Green, Minford, New Boston, Northwest, Notre Dame (Catholic), Portsmouth, Scioto County Career Technical Center (serving both K–12 and post-secondary students), Sciotoville Community School/East HS (charter), Valley, Washington-Nile (Ports. West) and Wheelersburg.

See also Ohio High School Athletic Association and Southern Ohio Conference.

=== Libraries ===
The Portsmouth Public Library (Ohio) was established as a Carnegie library in 1906. It now also has four branches and a bookmobile to serve the county as well. The library has branches in Lucasville, New Boston, South Webster and Wheelersburg.

== Transportation ==
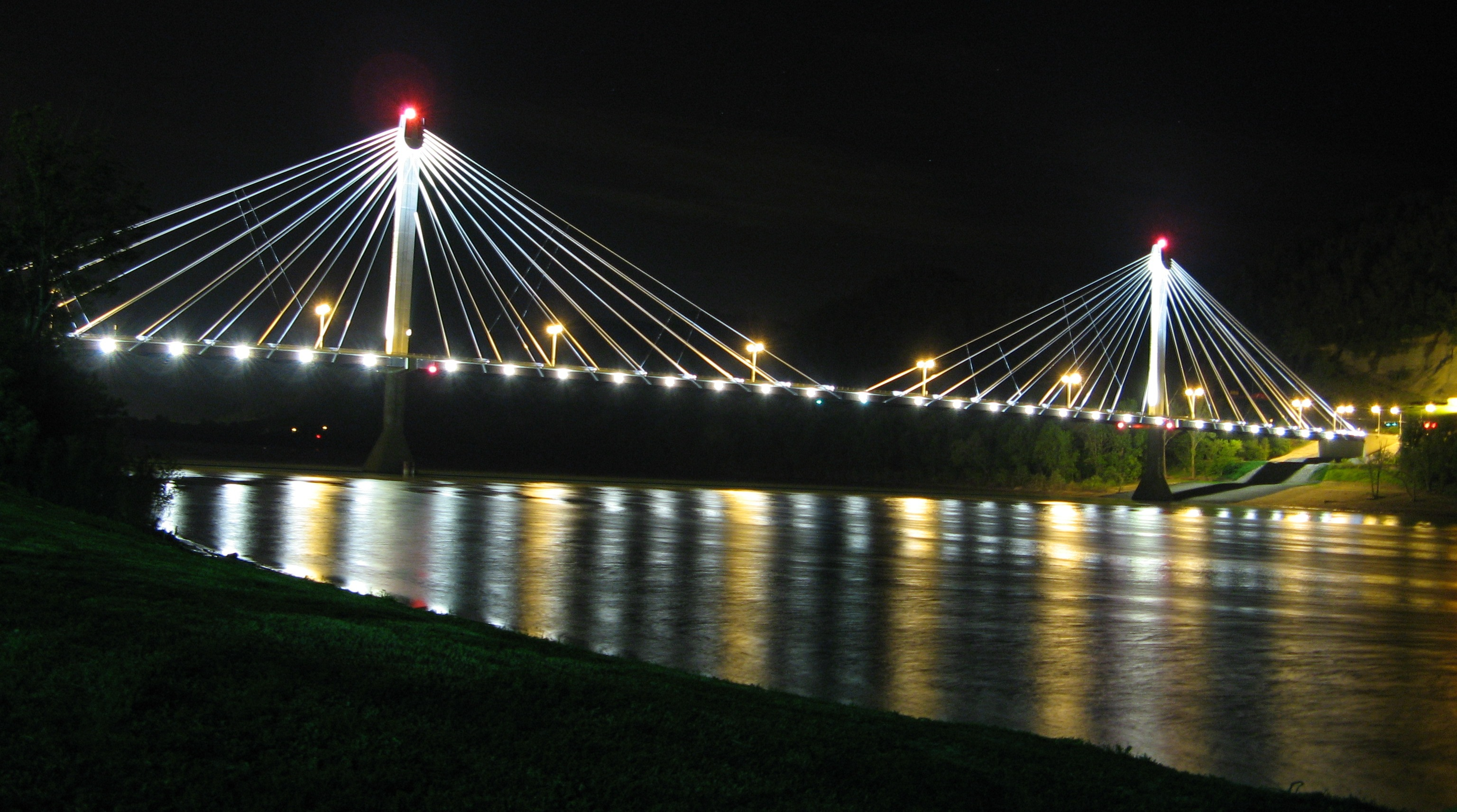
A nighttime view of the newly built U.S. Grant Bridge carrying U.S. 23 over the Ohio River into downtown Portsmouth from Kentucky

=== Highways ===
Scioto County is served by two major highways, the north–south U.S. 23 and the east–west U.S. 52. Other routes include SR 73, SR 104, SR 125, SR 139, SR 140, SR 335, SR 348, SR 522, SR 728, SR 776, and SR 823.

=== Rail ===
Norfolk Southern offers a railyard for long-distance shipping and is currently reopening the repair shops. Amtrak offers a passenger service to the Portsmouth/Scioto County area under the Cardinal route. The passenger station is located in South Shore, Kentucky, across the Ohio River.

=== Air ===
Scioto County offers air services with the Greater Portsmouth Regional Airport located in Minford, Ohio, which is approximately 14 miles (23 km) northeast of Portsmouth on SR 335. The nearest airport with scheduled passenger service is Huntington/Tri-State Airport (HTS) in West Virginia, about 60 miles (97 km) east of Portsmouth on I-64.

=== Public transportation ===
Public transportation for Scioto County is offered through Access Scioto County.

== Media ==
Scioto County is a dividing line of numerous television markets, which includes the Columbus, Cincinnati and Huntington-Charleston markets. Local television stations include WSAZ-NBC (channel 3.1), WZAS-myNetwork (myZtv channel 3.2), WOWK-CBS (channel 13.1), WCHS-ABC (channel 8.1) and WQCW, a CW affiliate with an office in Portsmouth and Charleston, and more recently WTZP-LD "The Zone", an America One Affiliate that offers more local programming, such as news, high school sports, community events and locally produced shows about the area. Local radio stations WIOI, WPYK, WNXT and WZZZ serve the county and surrounding areas.

The county is also served by three newspapers. The Portsmouth Daily Times is the county's only daily newspaper. The Community Common is a free biweekly newspaper, and the Scioto Voice is a weekly newspaper that is mailed to subscribers. The University Chronicle is Shawnee State University's student-led newspaper. Of these, only three are locally owned and operated (WTZP, WIOI, and The Scioto Voice).

== Sports ==
=== Professional ===
Scioto County had a series of semi-pro football teams in the 1920s and 1930s, the most notable being the Portsmouth Shoe-Steels, whose roster included player-coach Jim Thorpe. From 1929 to 1933, Portsmouth was home to a professional football team, The Portsmouth Spartans. This team later became the NFL franchise Detroit Lions in 1934. The Portsmouth Spartans also competed in the first professional football night game versus the Green Bay Packers in 1930.

The Portsmouth Explorers were one of the original baseball teams in the Frontier League, a non-affiliated minor league organization. The Explorers played in the league's first three seasons, from 1993 to 1995. In 1938, Portsmouth was also home to the Portsmouth Red Birds, a minor-league team owned by the St. Louis Cardinals.

=== Collegiate ===
Shawnee State University (SSU) is a member of the National Association of Intercollegiate Athletics (NAIA-Division II). It has participated in 24 national championships in 6 of 11 sponsored sports. The university's women's basketball team won an NAIA National Title in 1999 and finished in the final four in 1995. The softball team has also had national exposure, reaching the "Sweet 16" on several occasions. The team finished 10th in 1992, 8th in 1995, 9th in 1996, and 9th in 2001.

=== Amateur ===
The 12 local high schools, the other educational institutions, the adult leagues, and the development leagues (e.g. AAU and club organizations) generate a great deal of participation as either participants or as followers of sports teams. The teams have made 60 trips to the Ohio High School Athletic Association championships, winning 19 state titles. These have included four softball titles (Clay HS in 1980, 1981, & 1983 and Wheelersburg HS in 2016); five baseball titles (East HS in 1973, Valley HS in 1975, and Wheelersburg HS in 1996, 2012, and 2013); four football titles (two by Notre Dame HS in 1967 and 1970 and two by Wheelersburg HS in 1989 and 2017); and six boys' basketball titles (1931, 1961, 1978 and 1988 by Portsmouth HS and 2006 by South Webster HS).

== Culture ==
The Vern Riffe Arts Center, on the Shawnee State University campus, hosts many local and traveling performances, including Broadway plays and Miss Ohio pageants. Scioto County is home to the Boneyfiddle Commercial District (which is on the National Register of Historic Places), SSU's Clark Planetarium, the 1810 House, Greenup Locks & Dam, the Philip Moore Stone House, Roy Rogers' Memorabilia Exhibit, the Southern Ohio Museum, and Spartan Municipal Stadium.

== Events ==
Scioto County is best known for Portsmouth's "River Days" activities, which include a parade, a pageant associated with local high schools, boat races on the Ohio River (in the past), musical performances and a carnival. River Days occurs on Labor Day (the first Monday of September) weekend. Activities begin on Thursday evening and the parade and pageant is on Saturday.

The Scioto County Fair is held in the first full week of August of each year. It is one of the largest in the state, drawing approximately 75,000 visitors each year (the single-day record is 17,000). The first county fair was held in 1828; in 1908 Lucasville became the official site when three fairs (Mount Joy, Portsmouth and Lucasville) merged into one. The Roy Rogers' Homecoming Festival is held each June.

== Communities ==
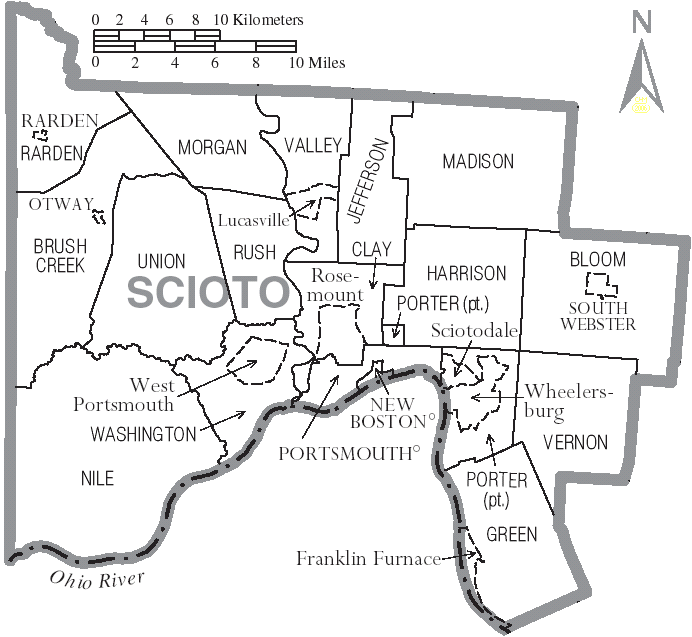
Map of Scioto County, with municipal and township labels

=== City ===
- Portsmouth (county seat)

=== Villages ===
- New Boston
- Otway
- Rarden
- South Webster

=== Townships ===
- Bloom
- Brush Creek
- Clay
- Green
- Harrison
- Jefferson
- Madison
- Morgan
- Nile
- Porter
- Rarden
- Rush
- Union
- Valley
- Vernon
- Washington

=== Census-designated places ===
- Clarktown
- Franklin Furnace
- Friendship
- Lucasville
- McDermott
- Minford
- Rosemount
- Sciotodale
- West Portsmouth
- Wheelersburg

=== Unincorporated communities ===
- Alexandria
- Ashley Corner
- Bear Creek
- Bloom Junction
- Buena Vista
- Camp Oyo
- Clifford
- Dennis
- Dry Run
- Eifort‡
- Hales Creek
- Happy Hours Addition
- Harrison Mills
- Haverhill
- Henley
- Junior Furnace
- Kennvale
- Lombardsville
- Lyra
- McGaw
- Mount Joy
- Mule Town
- Pink
- Pinkerman
- Pond Run
- Powellsville
- Rubyville
- Rushtown
- Scioto Furnace
- Sedan
- Slocum
- Sugar Grove
- Wallace Mills
- Youngs

== Notable residents ==
- Dale Bandy, former Ohio University basketball coach
- Kathleen Battle, opera singer
- Al Bridwell, former Major League Baseball (MLB) player
- Earl Thomas Conley, country music singer and writer
- Martin Dillon, musician
- Chuck Ealey, American football player
- Steve Free, folk singer, State of Ohio Governor's Award winner (for Individual Artist) in 2008
- Bob Haney, former basketball player and coach for the University of South Carolina
- Bill Harsha, congressman
- Larry Hisle, former MLB player, manager of youth outreach in the Milwaukee Brewers organization since 2019
- Redonda Miller, MD, MBA, first female president of the Johns Hopkins Hospital
- Rocky Nelson, former MLB player
- Josh Newman, former MLB pitcher for the Colorado Rockies and Kansas City Royals
- Al Oliver, former MLB player
- Branch Rickey, baseball executive
- Vern Riffe, Ohio politician (1959–95), Speaker of the Ohio House of Representatives (1975–94)
- Brett Roberts, former National Basketball Association player
- Barbara Robinson, author
- Roy Rogers, singer and cowboy movie star
- Ted Strickland, former U.S. representative from Ohio and former governor of Ohio
- Gene Tenace, former MLB player

== See also ==
- National Register of Historic Places listings in Scioto County, Ohio
- Scioto Company (1787–1790)
