= Mifflin Township, Ohio =

Mifflin Township, Ohio may refer to several places:

- Mifflin Township, Ashland County, Ohio
- Mifflin Township, Franklin County, Ohio
- Mifflin Township, Pike County, Ohio
- Mifflin Township, Richland County, Ohio
- Mifflin Township, Wyandot County, Ohio
