= Mifflin Township =

Mifflin Township may refer to:

== Ohio ==
- Mifflin Township, Ashland County, Ohio
- Mifflin Township, Franklin County, Ohio
- Mifflin Township, Pike County, Ohio
- Mifflin Township, Richland County, Ohio
- Mifflin Township, Wyandot County, Ohio

== Pennsylvania ==
- Mifflin Township, Columbia County, Pennsylvania
- Mifflin Township, Dauphin County, Pennsylvania
- Mifflin Township, Lycoming County, Pennsylvania
