= 1984 United States presidential election in Ohio =

- November 6, 1984
- Turnout: 73.66%

Nominee	Ronald Reagan	Walter Mondale
Party	Republican	Democratic
Home state	California	Minnesota
Running mate	George H. W. Bush	Geraldine Ferraro
Electoral vote	23	0
Popular vote	2,678,560	1,825,440
Percentage	58.90%	40.14%

Reagan
50–60%
60–70%
70–80%
80–90%
90–100%
Mondale
50–60%
60–70%
70–80%
80–90%
90–100%
President before election
Ronald Reagan
Republican
Elected President
Ronald Reagan
Republican

The 1984 United States presidential election in Ohio took place on November 6, 1984. All 50 states and the District of Columbia were part of the election. State voters chose 23 electors to the Electoral College, which selected the president and vice president of the United States.

Ohio was won by incumbent United States President Ronald Reagan of California, who was running against former Vice President Walter Mondale of Minnesota. Reagan ran for a second time with incumbent Vice President and former C.I.A. Director George H. W. Bush of Texas, and Mondale ran with Representative Geraldine Ferraro of New York, the first major female candidate for the vice presidency.

The presidential election of 1984 was a very partisan election for Ohio, with over 99% of the electorate voting only either Democratic or Republican, though several more parties did appear on the ballot. Reagan won the election in Ohio by a decisive 18.76% margin, making Ohio just 0.54% more Republican than the nation overall and therefore the closest to the national results. Reagan won all but six of Ohio's counties; amongst the state's population centers, he scored particularly strong wins in Hamilton and Franklin Counties, home to Cincinnati and Columbus respectively; he won over 60% in both and won each by a raw vote margin of over 100,000 votes. Mondale's wins were limited to Cuyahoga County, which he won with less than 60% of the vote, and a series of industrial counties in Appalachian Ohio: Mahoning, Trumbull, Jefferson, Belmont, and Monroe. Unlike Dwight D. Eisenhower in 1952 and 1956 or Richard Nixon in 1972, Reagan was unable to capture the state's largest county, Cuyahoga; however, Mondale was unable to retain Athens County (home to Ohio University).

While Pennsylvania and much of the Upper Midwest shifted more Democratic in this election, Ohio voted in line with the nation, presaging its role as the only large Midwestern state (and indeed as the only large state outside the South) to vote Republican in 2000, 2004, and 2020. However, Ohio's delegation in the United States House of Representatives switched from Republican to Democratic control simultaneously.

As of the 2024 presidential election, this is the last election in which Lucas County, Athens County, and Summit County voted for a Republican presidential candidate, the last until 2016 that Ashtabula County voted for a Republican candidate, and the last until 2020 that Lorain County voted for a Republican candidate. Of the counties that Mondale won, only Cuyahoga County has never been won by a Republican presidential candidate since.

== Campaign ==
In the Democratic primary, Jesse Jackson's voters were 81% black, 18% white, and 1% members of other groups.

== Results ==
1984 United States presidential election in Ohio
Party	Candidate	Votes	Percentage	Electoral votes
Republican	Ronald Reagan (incumbent)	2,678,560	58.90%	23
Democratic	Walter Mondale	1,825,440	40.14%	0
Not Designated	Dennis Serrette	12,090	0.27%	0
Not Designated	Lyndon LaRouche	10,693	0.24%	0
Not Designated	David Bergland	5,886	0.13%	0
Not Designated	Gus Hall	4,438	0.10%	0
Not Designated	Melvin Mason	4,344	0.10%	0
Not Designated	Edward Winn	3,565	0.08%	0
Not Designated	Larry Holmes	2,565	0.06%	0
Other write-ins		34	>0.01%	0
Prohibition	Earl Dodge(write-in)	4	>0.01%	0
Totals		4,547,619	100.0%	23

Map of the presidential election result by precinct in Youngstown, OH (Located in Mahoning County).

=== Results by county ===
County	Ronald Reagan Republican		Walter Mondale Democratic		Various candidates Other parties		Margin		Total votes cast
County	#	%	#	%	#	%	#	%	Total votes cast
Adams	6,113	62.83%	3,534	36.32%	82	0.84%	2,579	26.51%	9,729
Allen	33,506	72.98%	12,176	26.52%	229	0.50%	21,330	46.46%	45,911
Ashland	14,339	74.40%	4,786	24.83%	147	0.76%	9,553	49.57%	19,272
Ashtabula	21,669	52.34%	19,344	46.73%	384	0.93%	2,325	5.61%	41,397
Athens	11,548	52.59%	10,201	46.46%	209	0.95%	1,347	6.13%	21,958
Auglaize	14,766	77.72%	4,102	21.59%	132	0.69%	10,664	56.13%	19,000
Belmont	15,170	43.52%	19,458	55.82%	228	0.65%	-4,288	-12.30%	34,856
Brown	8,221	66.28%	4,067	32.79%	116	0.94%	4,154	33.49%	12,404
Butler	76,216	72.92%	27,700	26.50%	598	0.57%	48,516	46.42%	104,514
Carroll	6,703	63.33%	3,771	35.63%	110	1.04%	2,932	27.70%	10,584
Champaign	9,935	73.05%	3,544	26.06%	121	0.89%	6,391	46.99%	13,600
Clark	35,831	62.05%	21,154	36.63%	759	1.31%	14,677	25.42%	57,744
Clermont	35,316	74.63%	11,713	24.75%	290	0.61%	23,603	49.88%	47,319
Clinton	9,603	73.77%	3,332	25.60%	83	0.64%	6,271	48.17%	13,018
Columbiana	24,552	54.43%	20,155	44.68%	403	0.89%	4,397	9.75%	45,110
Coshocton	9,842	68.71%	4,392	30.66%	89	0.62%	5,450	38.05%	14,323
Crawford	14,682	74.08%	4,932	24.88%	206	1.04%	9,750	49.20%	19,820
Cuyahoga	284,094	43.60%	362,626	55.65%	4,913	0.75%	-78,532	-12.05%	651,633
Darke	16,379	72.81%	5,904	26.25%	211	0.94%	10,475	46.56%	22,494
Defiance	10,951	67.89%	5,004	31.02%	175	1.08%	5,947	36.87%	16,130
Delaware	19,050	76.23%	5,773	23.10%	166	0.66%	13,277	53.13%	24,989
Erie	19,174	57.83%	13,508	40.74%	472	1.42%	5,666	17.09%	33,154
Fairfield	30,843	75.17%	9,817	23.92%	373	0.91%	21,026	51.25%	41,033
Fayette	6,838	75.80%	2,126	23.57%	57	0.63%	4,712	52.23%	9,021
Franklin	250,360	64.12%	131,530	33.68%	8,584	2.20%	118,830	30.44%	390,474
Fulton	11,412	72.55%	4,217	26.81%	101	0.64%	7,195	45.74%	15,730
Gallia	8,194	65.27%	4,251	33.86%	109	0.87%	3,943	31.41%	12,554
Geauga	22,369	68.29%	9,954	30.39%	431	1.32%	12,415	37.90%	32,754
Greene	34,267	66.27%	17,129	33.12%	316	0.61%	17,138	33.15%	51,712
Guernsey	10,252	66.81%	4,967	32.37%	125	0.81%	5,285	34.44%	15,344
Hamilton	246,288	63.34%	140,350	36.10%	2,177	0.56%	105,938	27.24%	388,815
Hancock	22,169	78.34%	5,758	20.35%	370	1.31%	16,411	57.99%	28,297
Hardin	8,722	69.11%	3,813	30.21%	85	0.67%	4,909	38.90%	12,620
Harrison	4,276	55.45%	3,370	43.70%	66	0.86%	906	11.75%	7,712
Henry	9,317	76.54%	2,779	22.83%	77	0.63%	6,538	53.71%	12,173
Highland	9,000	69.90%	3,784	29.39%	91	0.71%	5,216	40.51%	12,875
Hocking	6,071	64.16%	3,280	34.66%	112	1.18%	2,791	29.50%	9,463
Holmes	5,146	74.11%	1,737	25.01%	61	0.88%	3,409	49.10%	6,944
Huron	14,388	67.96%	6,609	31.22%	174	0.82%	7,779	36.74%	21,171
Jackson	7,411	62.24%	4,369	36.69%	128	1.07%	3,042	25.55%	11,908
Jefferson	17,105	42.47%	22,832	56.69%	340	0.84%	-5,727	-14.22%	40,277
Knox	14,062	70.66%	5,730	28.79%	109	0.55%	8,332	41.87%	19,901
Lake	54,587	59.12%	36,711	39.76%	1,027	1.11%	17,876	19.36%	92,325
Lawrence	14,793	55.96%	11,431	43.24%	213	0.81%	3,362	12.72%	26,437
Licking	37,560	72.26%	13,995	26.93%	421	0.81%	23,565	45.33%	51,976
Logan	12,230	76.54%	3,645	22.81%	104	0.65%	8,585	53.73%	15,979
Lorain	57,379	50.77%	52,970	46.87%	2,672	2.36%	4,409	3.90%	113,021
Lucas	100,285	50.25%	97,293	48.76%	1,976	0.99%	2,992	1.49%	199,554
Madison	8,979	74.91%	2,928	24.43%	80	0.67%	6,051	50.48%	11,987
Mahoning	53,424	40.65%	76,514	58.21%	1,500	1.14%	-23,090	-17.56%	131,438
Marion	17,392	65.77%	8,827	33.38%	224	0.85%	8,565	32.39%	26,443
Medina	30,690	65.38%	15,897	33.86%	357	0.76%	14,793	31.52%	46,944
Meigs	6,307	63.52%	3,549	35.74%	73	0.74%	2,758	27.78%	9,929
Mercer	11,542	71.49%	4,422	27.39%	180	1.11%	7,120	44.10%	16,144
Miami	26,300	72.42%	9,695	26.70%	320	0.88%	16,605	45.72%	36,315
Monroe	3,302	47.32%	3,611	51.75%	65	0.93%	-309	-4.43%	6,978
Montgomery	137,053	58.97%	94,016	40.45%	1,333	0.57%	43,037	18.52%	232,402
Morgan	3,994	67.66%	1,868	31.64%	41	0.69%	2,126	36.02%	5,903
Morrow	8,116	73.50%	2,839	25.71%	87	0.79%	5,277	47.79%	11,042
Muskingum	21,821	67.98%	10,037	31.27%	243	0.76%	11,784	36.71%	32,101
Noble	3,853	67.70%	1,777	31.22%	61	1.07%	2,076	36.48%	5,691
Ottawa	10,920	60.41%	7,053	39.02%	102	0.56%	3,867	21.39%	18,075
Paulding	5,545	65.71%	2,811	33.31%	83	0.98%	2,734	32.40%	8,439
Perry	7,548	65.09%	3,961	34.16%	88	0.76%	3,587	30.93%	11,597
Pickaway	11,942	73.90%	4,110	25.43%	108	0.67%	7,832	48.47%	16,160
Pike	6,318	55.90%	4,895	43.31%	89	0.79%	1,423	12.59%	11,302
Portage	29,536	57.14%	21,719	42.02%	432	0.84%	7,817	15.12%	51,687
Preble	11,065	71.84%	4,198	27.25%	140	0.91%	6,867	44.59%	15,403
Putnam	11,936	78.26%	3,194	20.94%	121	0.79%	8,742	57.32%	15,251
Richland	35,299	68.10%	16,141	31.14%	396	0.76%	19,158	36.96%	51,836
Ross	17,015	66.60%	8,020	31.39%	513	2.01%	8,995	35.21%	25,548
Sandusky	17,214	66.16%	8,564	32.91%	242	0.93%	8,650	33.25%	26,020
Scioto	18,818	56.65%	14,120	42.51%	281	0.85%	4,698	14.14%	33,219
Seneca	16,520	67.04%	7,905	32.08%	217	0.88%	8,615	34.96%	24,642
Shelby	13,509	75.12%	4,315	23.99%	159	0.88%	9,194	51.13%	17,983
Stark	98,434	59.69%	65,157	39.51%	1,325	0.80%	33,277	20.18%	164,916
Summit	115,637	50.99%	109,569	48.32%	1,574	0.69%	6,068	2.67%	226,780
Trumbull	45,623	44.18%	56,902	55.11%	734	0.71%	-11,279	-10.93%	103,259
Tuscarawas	19,366	59.13%	13,149	40.14%	239	0.73%	6,217	18.99%	32,754
Union	9,336	77.79%	2,579	21.49%	86	0.72%	6,757	56.30%	12,001
Van Wert	9,570	73.68%	3,338	25.70%	80	0.62%	6,232	47.98%	12,988
Vinton	3,041	59.80%	1,990	39.13%	54	1.06%	1,051	20.67%	5,085
Warren	29,848	76.40%	9,031	23.11%	191	0.49%	20,817	53.29%	39,070
Washington	16,529	66.13%	7,920	31.69%	544	2.18%	8,609	34.44%	24,993
Wayne	24,475	67.79%	11,323	31.36%	305	0.84%	13,152	36.43%	36,103
Williams	10,804	74.11%	3,624	24.86%	150	1.03%	7,180	49.25%	14,578
Wood	29,750	64.74%	15,907	34.62%	297	0.65%	13,843	30.12%	45,954
Wyandot	7,204	74.81%	2,342	24.32%	84	0.87%	4,862	50.49%	9,630
Totals	2,678,560	58.90%	1,825,440	40.14%	43,619	0.96%	853,119	18.76%	4,547,619

==== Counties that flipped from Democratic to Republican ====
- Athens
- Montgomery
- Pike
- Summit

== See also ==
- United States presidential elections in Ohio
- Presidency of Ronald Reagan

== Works cited ==
- Ranney, Austin, ed. (1985). The American Elections of 1984. Duke University Press. ISBN 0822302306.
