= Pike County Airport =

Pike County Airport may refer to:

- Pike County Airport (Kentucky) in Pikeville, Kentucky, United States (FAA: PBX)
- Pike County Airport (Ohio) in Waverly, Ohio, United States (FAA: EOP)
- McComb-Pike County Airport (John E. Lewis Field) in McComb, Mississippi, United States (FAA: MCB)
