= Buchanan, Ohio =

Unincorporated community in Ohio, U.S.

Coordinates: 39°08′59″N 83°07′25″W

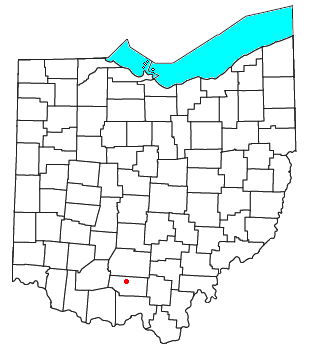
Location of Buchanan, Ohio

Buchanan is an unincorporated community in Pebble Township, Pike County, Ohio, United States. It shares nearby Waverly, Ohio's ZIP code 45690. It lies along State Route 772.

The community was named after James Buchanan, 15th President of the United States.

== Gallery ==
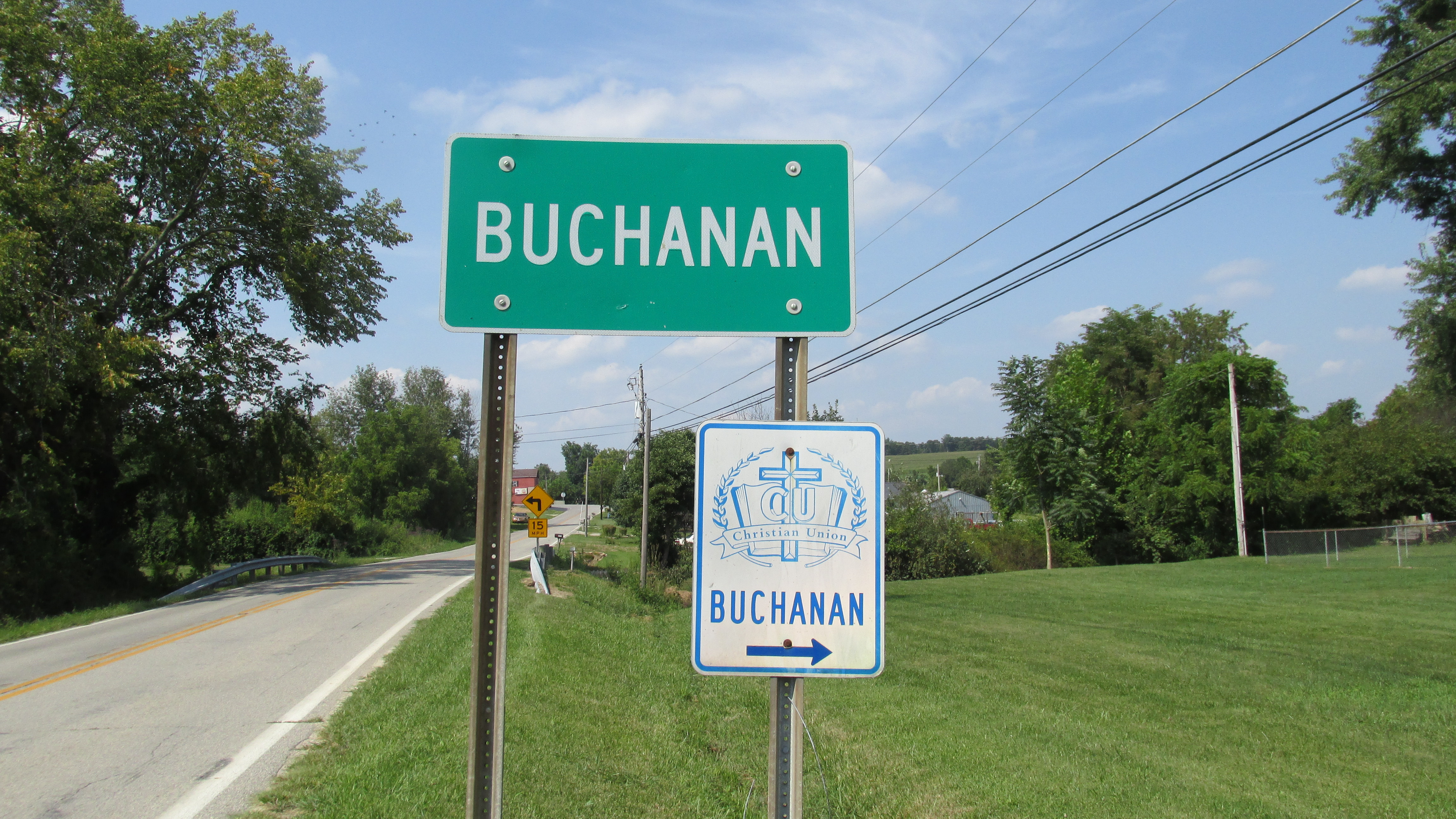
Buchanan community sign

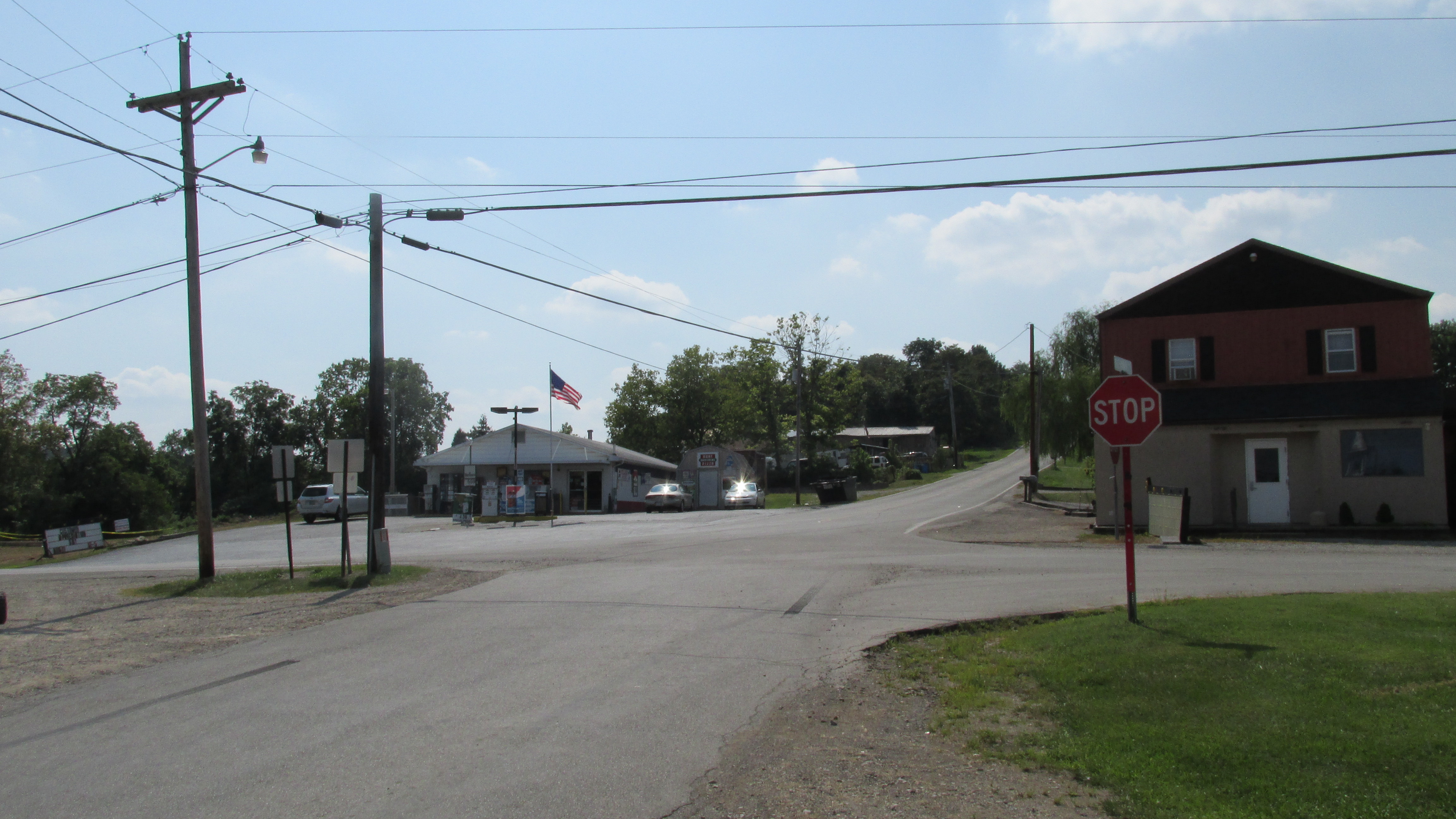
Intersection of Buchanan Road, Carl Penn Road and Ohio Highway 772 in Buchanan
