= Arkoe =

Arkoe may refer to the following places in the United States:

- Arkoe, Missouri
- Arkoe, Ohio
