= Daleyville, Ohio =

- Unincorporated community
- Location within Ohio Location within the United States
- Coordinates: 39°06′24″N 83°03′14″W
- Country: United States
- State: Ohio
- County: Pike
- Elevation: 604 ft (184 m)
- Time zone: UTC-5 (Eastern (EST))
  - Summer (DST): UTC-4 (EDT)
- Area codes: 740 & 220
- GNIS feature ID: 1064502

Daleyville (also Dailyville, Dalyville) is an unincorporated community in Pike County, Ohio, United States.
