= Beaver, Ohio =

- Village
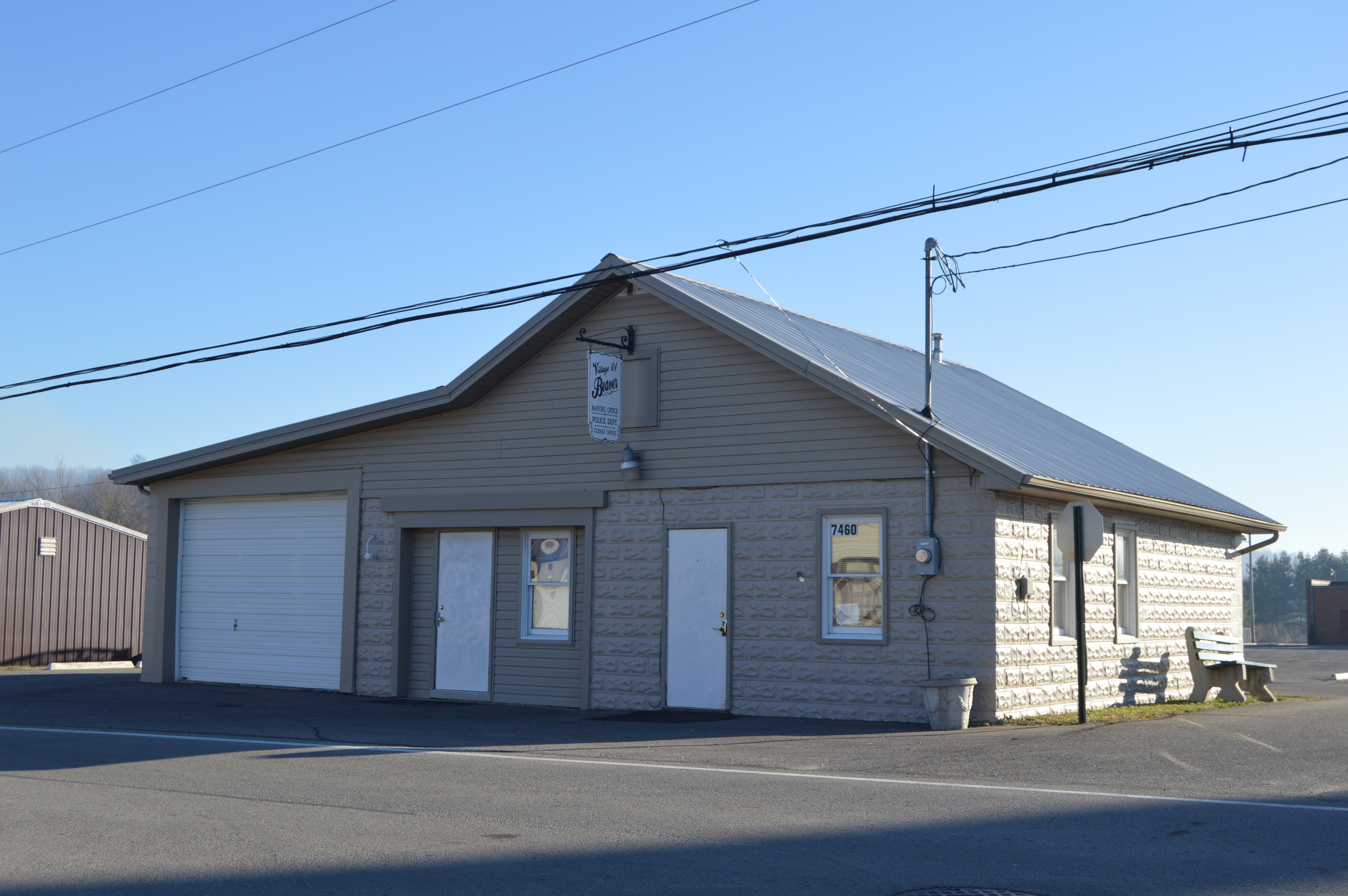
- Village hall

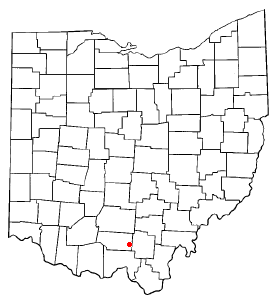
- Location of Beaver, Ohio

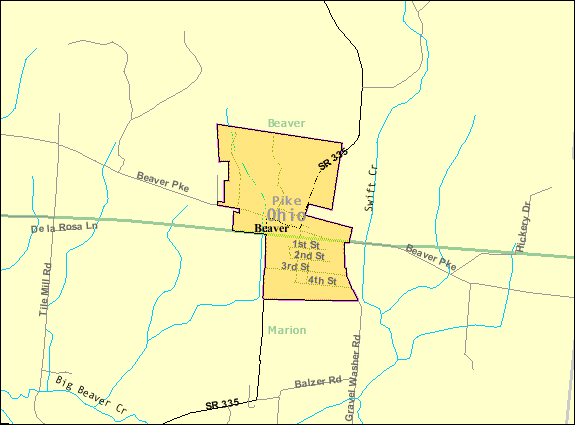
- Detailed map of Beaver
- Coordinates: 39°01′55″N 82°49′31″W
- Country: United States
- State: Ohio
- County: Pike

Area
  - Total: 0.39 sq mi (1.01 km^{2})
  - Land: 0.39 sq mi (1.01 km^{2})
  - Water: 0 sq mi (0.00 km^{2})
- Elevation: 696 ft (212 m)

Population (2020)
  - Total: 442
  - Estimate (2023): 436
  - Density: 1,132.7/sq mi (437.34/km^{2})
- Time zone: UTC-5 (Eastern (EST))
  - Summer (DST): UTC-4 (EDT)
- ZIP code: 45613
- Area code: 740
- FIPS code: 39-04696
- GNIS feature ID: 2398059

Beaver is a village in Pike County, Ohio, United States. The population was 442 at the 2020 census.

The village most likely was named after nearby Beaver Creek.

== Geography ==
According to the United States Census Bureau, the village has a total area of 0.39 square miles (1.01 km^{2}), all land.

== Demographics ==
Historical population
Census	Pop.	Note	%±
1900	262		—
1910	286		9.2%
1920	278		−2.8%
1930	295		6.1%
1940	305		3.4%
1950	285		−6.6%
1960	341		19.6%
1970	317		−7.0%
1980	330		4.1%
1990	336		1.8%
2000	464		38.1%
2010	449		−3.2%
2020	442		−1.6%
2023 (est.)	436	▼	−1.4%
U.S. Decennial Census

=== 2010 census ===
As of the census of 2010, there were 449 people, 182 households, and 109 families living in the village. The population density was 1,151.3 inhabitants per square mile (444.5/km^{2}). There were 221 housing units at an average density of 566.7 per square mile (218.8/km^{2}). The racial makeup of the village was 94.7% White, 0.4% from other races, and 4.9% from two or more races. Hispanic or Latino of any race were 2.2% of the population.

There were 182 households, of which 35.7% had children under the age of 18 living with them, 39.6% were married couples living together, 15.9% had a female householder with no husband present, 4.4% had a male householder with no wife present, and 40.1% were non-families. 34.6% of all households were made up of individuals, and 17% had someone living alone who was 65 years of age or older. The average household size was 2.47 and the average family size was 3.17.

The median age in the village was 31.8 years. 27.4% of residents were under the age of 18; 13.7% were between the ages of 18 and 24; 23.8% were from 25 to 44; 21.4% were from 45 to 64; and 13.6% were 65 years of age or older. The gender makeup of the village was 45.9% male and 54.1% female.

=== 2000 census ===
As of the census of 2000, there were 464 people, 195 households, and 124 families living in the village. The population density was 1,187.9 inhabitants per square mile (458.7/km^{2}). There were 226 housing units at an average density of 578.6 per square mile (223.4/km^{2}). The racial makeup of the village was 97.20% White, 0.65% Native American, 0.22% Asian, and 1.94% from two or more races. Hispanic or Latino of any race were 0.22% of the population.

There were 195 households, of which 34.4% had children under the age of 18 living with them, 45.1% were married couples living together, 16.4% had a female householder with no husband present, and 35.9% were non-families. 33.3% of all households were made up of individuals, and 13.8% had someone living alone who was 65 years of age or older. The average household size was 2.38 and the average family size was 3.04.

In the village, the population was spread out, with 30.4% under the age of 18, 8.2% from 18 to 24, 26.9% from 25 to 44, 19.8% from 45 to 64, and 14.7% who were 65 years of age or older. The median age was 34 years. For every 100 females, there were 81.3 males. For every 100 females age 18 and over, there were 78.5 males.

The median income for a household in the village was $22,632, and the median income for a family was $23,571. Males had a median income of $28,750 versus $20,000 for females. The per capita income for the village was $10,815. About 25.7% of families and 28.6% of the population were below the poverty line, including 46.4% of those under age 18 and 3.0% of those age 65 or over.

== Attractions ==
Dogwood Pass, a living history museum that is a replica of an Old West town, is located in Beaver.

== Education ==
Beaver Eastern Pike serves as the local school district for surrounding areas.

Beaver has a public library, a branch of the Garnet A. Wilson Public Library of Pike County.

== Gallery ==
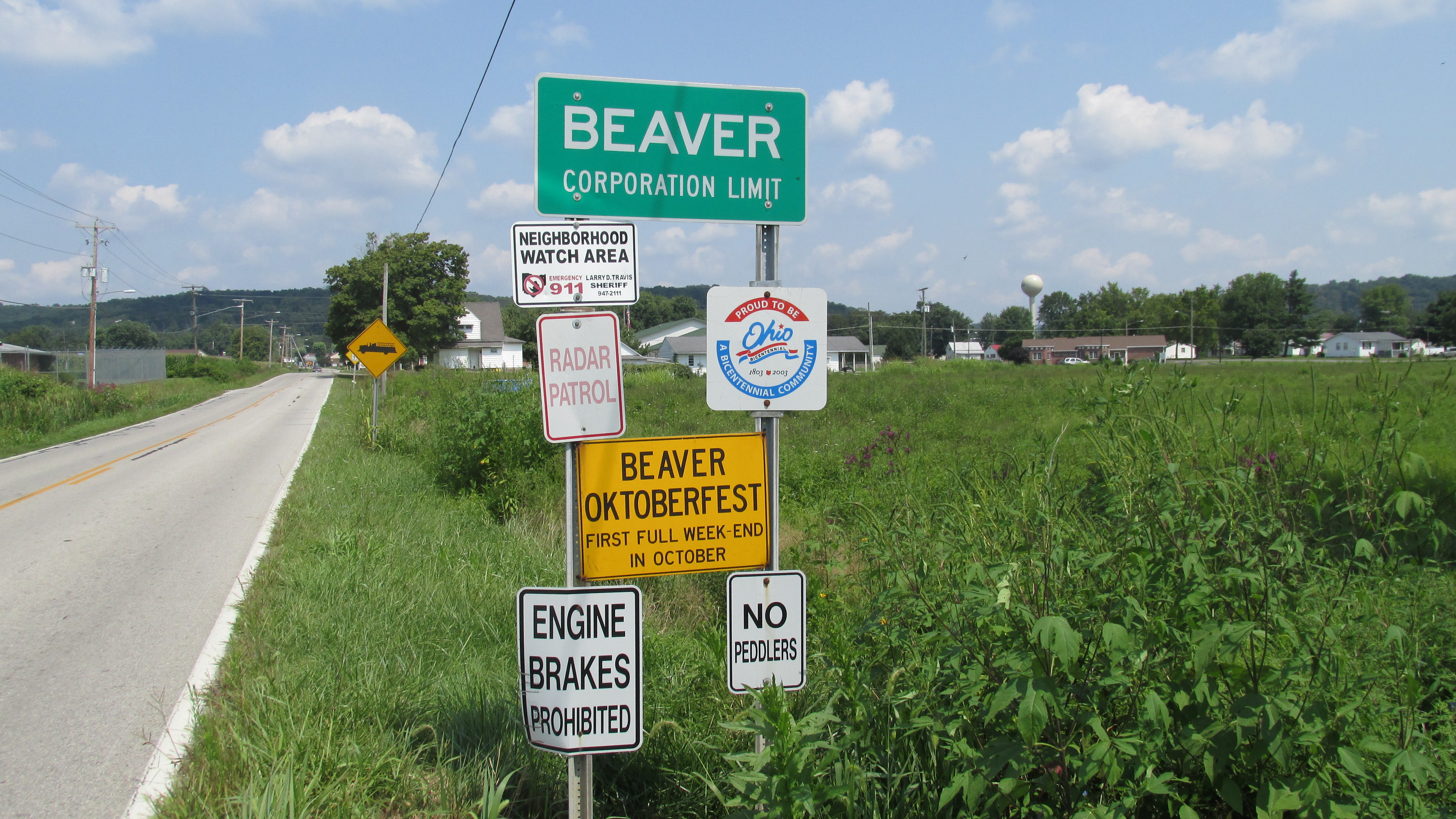
Beaver corporation limit sign.

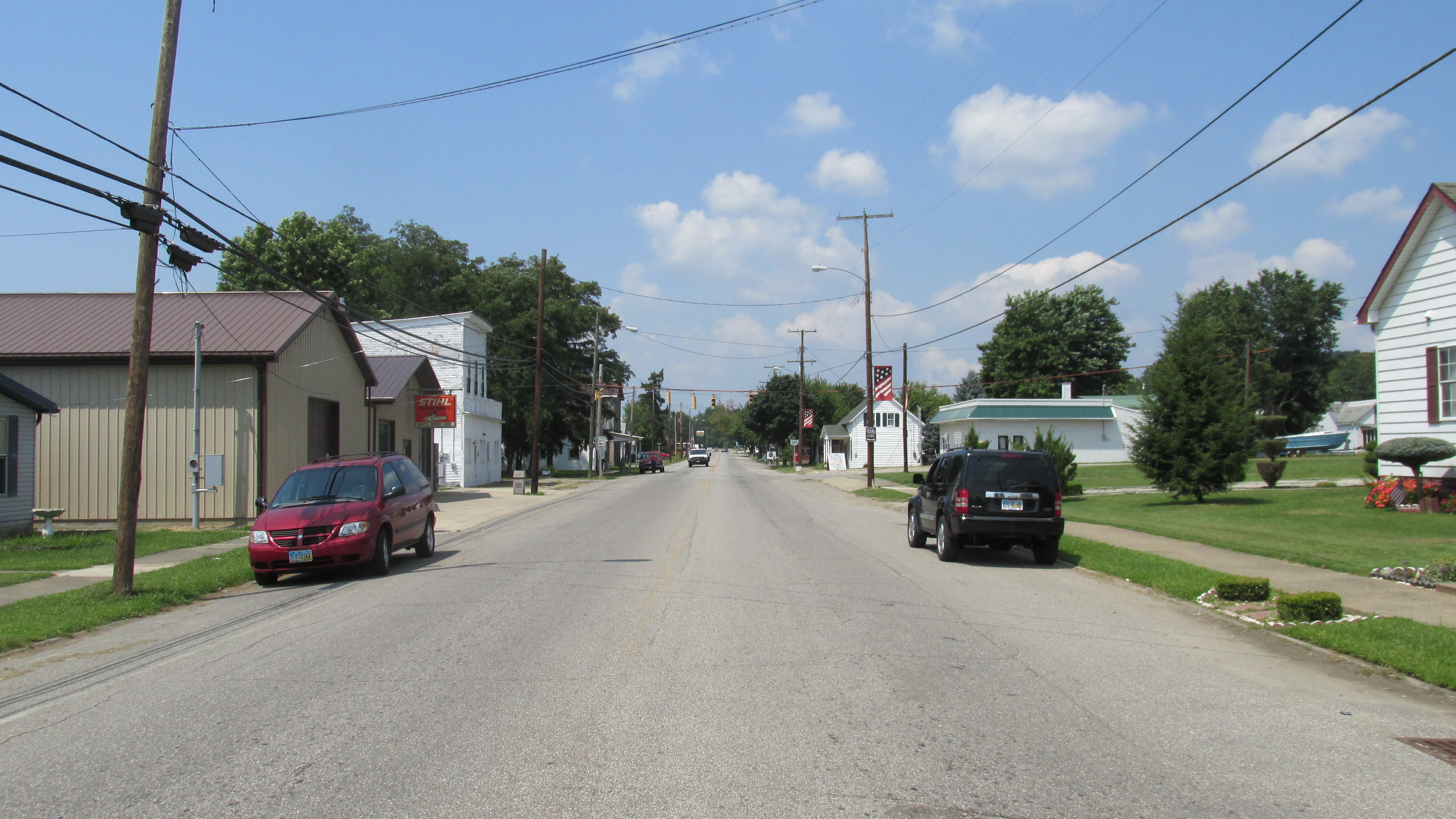
Looking west on Beaver Pike (Main Street) in Beaver.

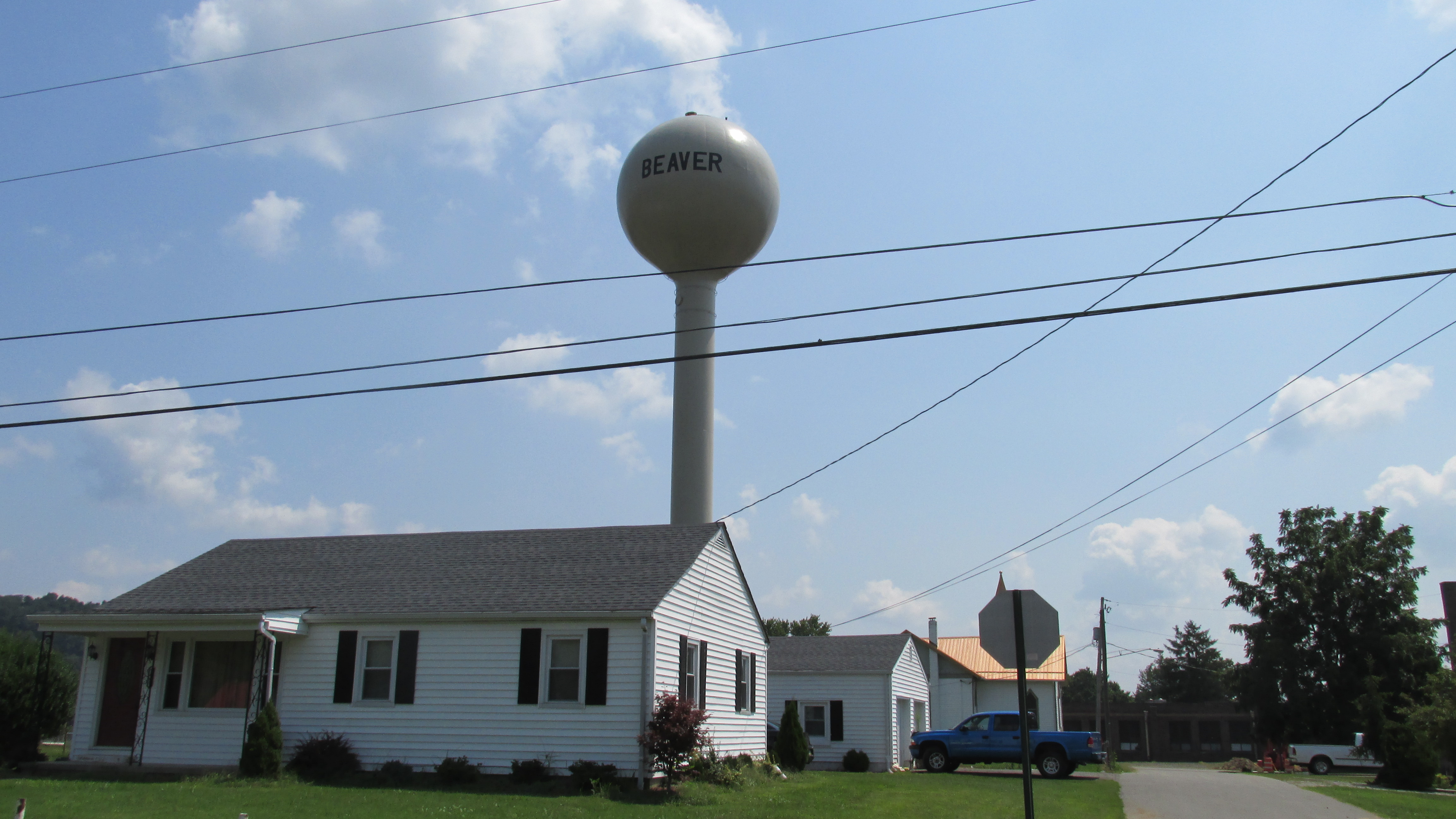
Water tower in Beaver. This is the tallest structure in the village.
