= Morgantown, Ohio =

Unincorporated community in Ohio, U.S.

Coordinates: 39°07′46″N 83°11′54″W

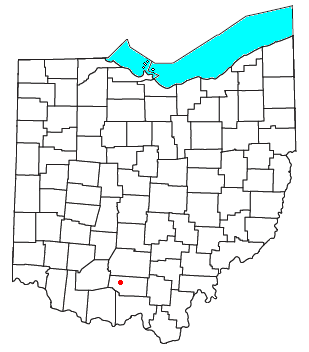
Location of Morgantown, Ohio

Morgantown is an unincorporated community located at the crossroads of Morgans Fork Road and Auerville Road in central Benton Township, Pike County, Ohio, United States. Although the community once possessed a school and a store, today it consists of a smattering of residential houses and the Morgantown Church of Christ in Christian Union.

Official population figures are not available because the community is neither incorporated nor classified as a census-designated place.

== Gallery ==
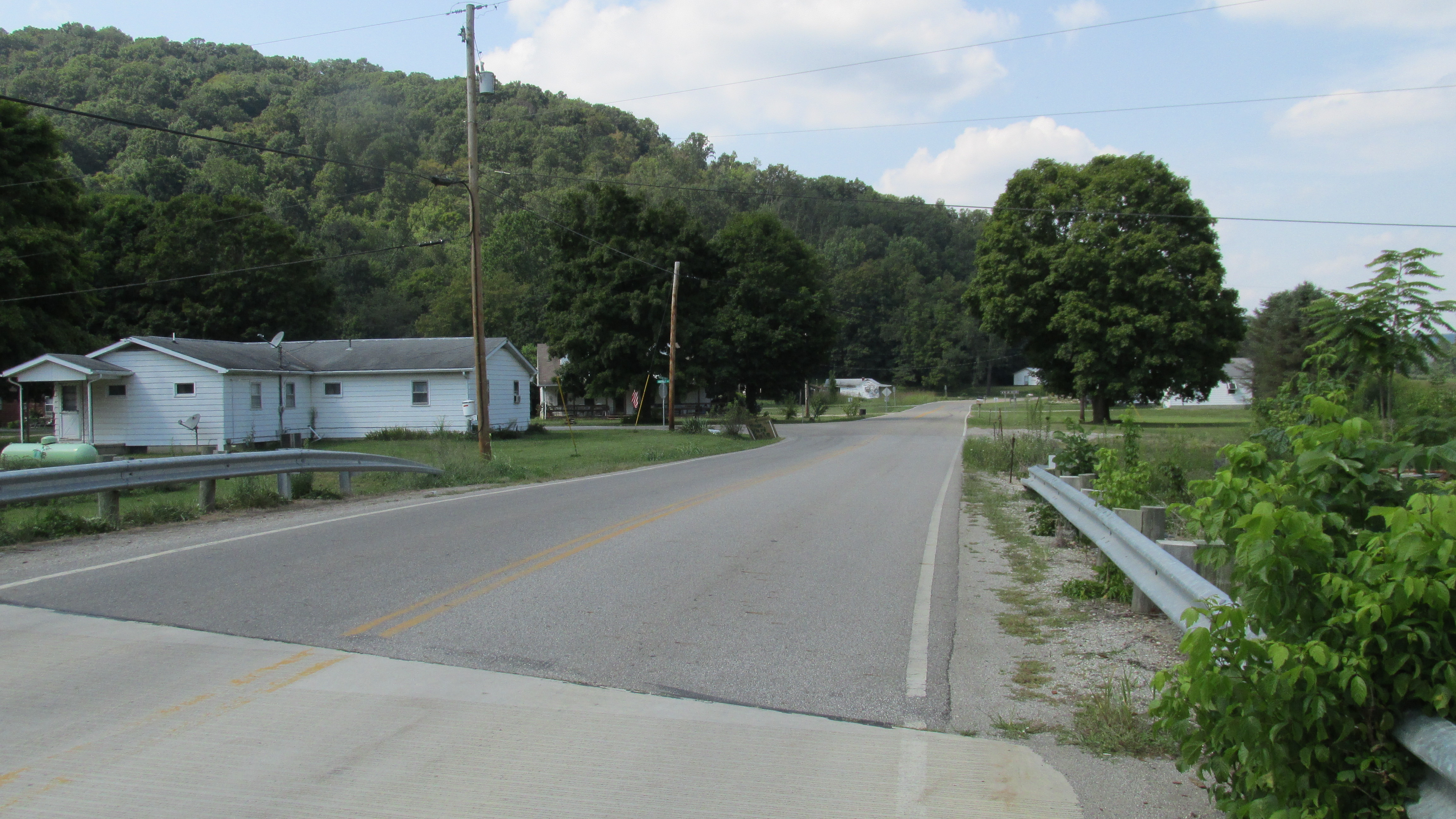
Junction of Morgan Fork and Auerville Roads

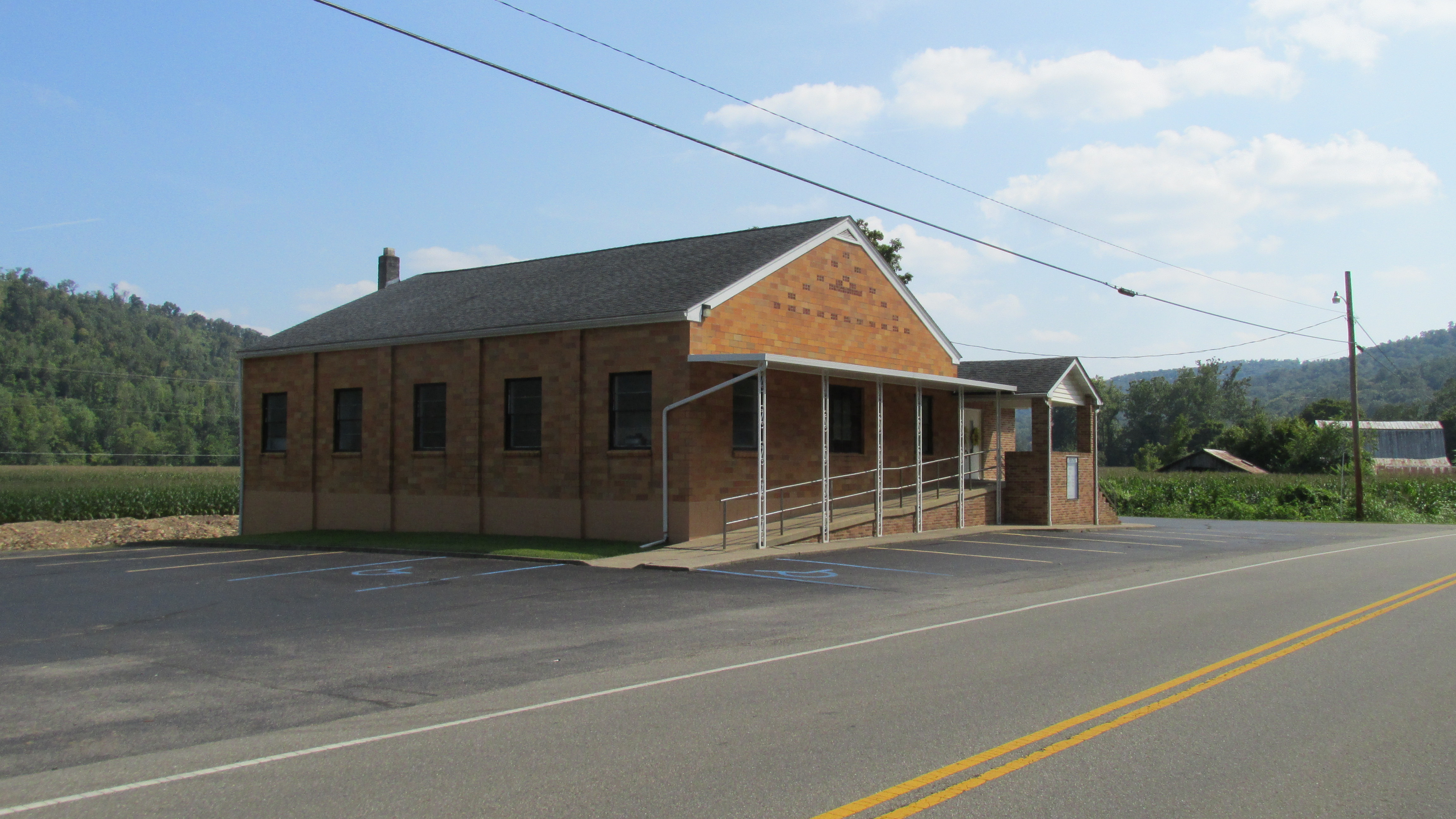
Morgantown Church of Christ in Christian Union
