= Pike County, Ohio =

County in Ohio, United States

- County
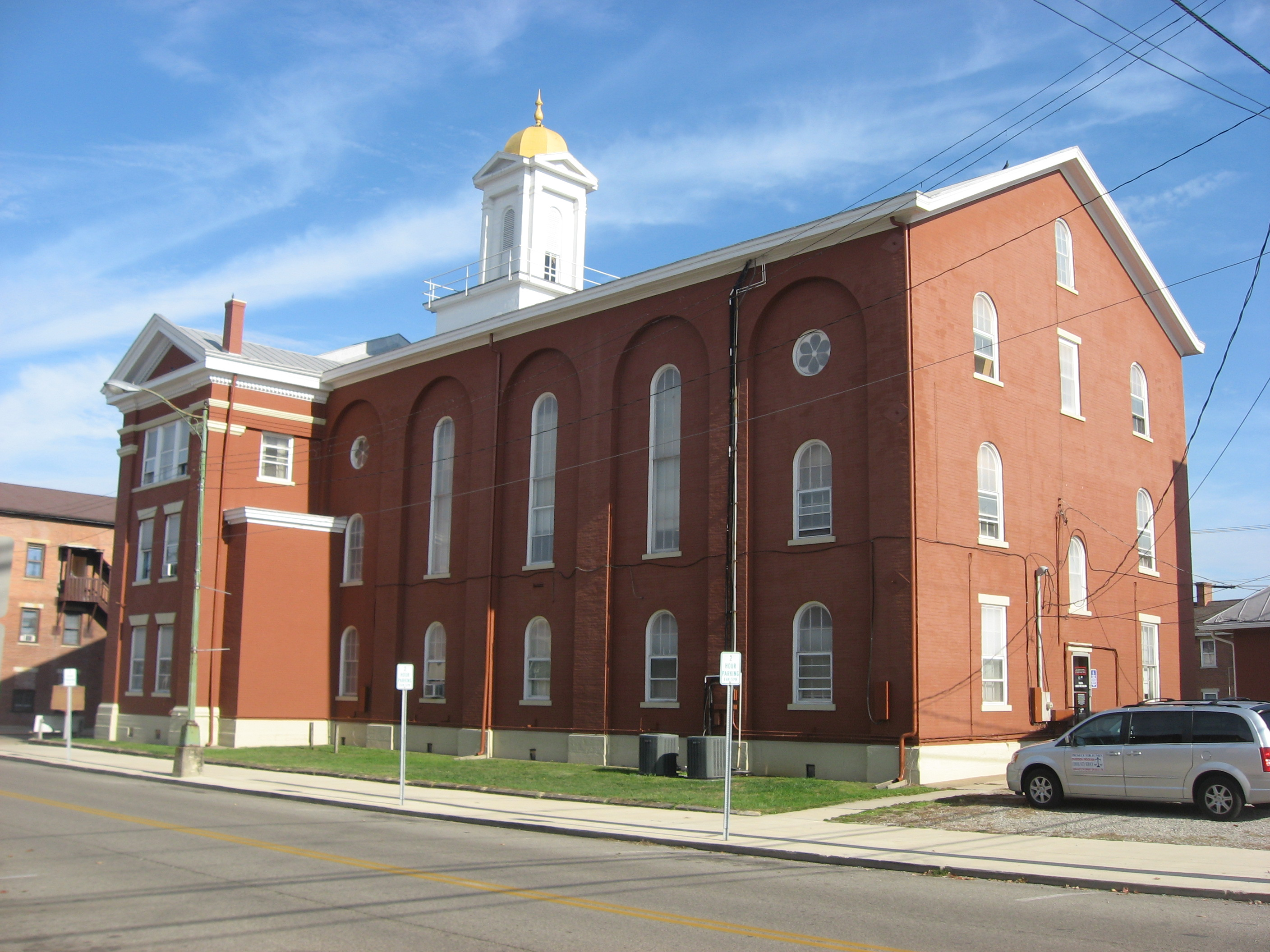
- Pike County Courthouse in Waverly.

- Flag Seal

- Location within the U.S. state of Ohio
- Coordinates: 39°05′N 83°04′W
- Country: United States
- State: Ohio
- Founded: February 1, 1815
- Named for: Zebulon Pike
- Seat: Waverly
- Largest city: Waverly

Area
  - Total: 444 sq mi (1,150 km^{2})
  - Land: 440 sq mi (1,100 km^{2})
  - Water: 3.7 sq mi (9.6 km^{2}) 0.8%

Population (2020)
  - Total: 27,088
  - Estimate (2025): 27,061 ▼
  - Density: 61/sq mi (24/km^{2})
- Time zone: UTC−5 (Eastern)
  - Summer (DST): UTC−4 (EDT)
- Congressional district: 2nd

Pike County is a county located in the Appalachian (southern) region of the U.S. state of Ohio. As of the 2020 census, the population was 27,088. Its county seat is Waverly, and the county is named for explorer Zebulon Pike.

== History ==
Pike County was organized on February 1, 1815, from portions of Scioto, Ross, and Adams Counties, and was named in honor of Zebulon Pike, the explorer and soldier who had recently been killed in the War of 1812.

Pike County was the site of the Pike County Massacre where eight members of the Rhoden family were shot and killed the evening of April 21–22, 2016.

== Geography ==
According to the U.S. Census Bureau, the county has a total area of 444 square miles (1,150 km^{2}), of which 440 square miles (1,100 km^{2}) is land and 3.7 square miles (9.6 km^{2}) (0.8%) is water.

=== Adjacent counties ===
- Ross County (north)
- Jackson County (east)
- Scioto County (south)
- Adams County (southwest)
- Highland County (west)

== Demographics ==
Historical population
Census	Pop.	Note	%±
1820	4,253		—
1830	6,024		41.6%
1840	7,626		26.6%
1850	10,953		43.6%
1860	13,643		24.6%
1870	15,447		13.2%
1880	17,927		16.1%
1890	17,482		−2.5%
1900	18,172		3.9%
1910	15,723		−13.5%
1920	14,151		−10.0%
1930	13,876		−1.9%
1940	16,113		16.1%
1950	14,607		−9.3%
1960	19,380		32.7%
1970	19,114		−1.4%
1980	22,802		19.3%
1990	24,249		6.3%
2000	27,695		14.2%
2010	28,709		3.7%
2020	27,088		−5.6%
2025 (est.)	27,061	▼	−0.1%
U.S. Decennial Census; 1790-1960 1900-1990; 1990-2000 2020

=== 2020 census ===
As of the 2020 census, the county had a population of 27,088. The median age was 41.2 years. 23.9% of residents were under the age of 18 and 18.2% of residents were 65 years of age or older. For every 100 females there were 98.2 males, and for every 100 females age 18 and over there were 95.5 males age 18 and over.

18.3% of residents lived in urban areas, while 81.7% lived in rural areas.

There were 10,656 households in the county, of which 31.3% had children under the age of 18 living in them. Of all households, 47.6% were married-couple households, 18.6% were households with a male householder and no spouse or partner present, and 25.9% were households with a female householder and no spouse or partner present. About 27.7% of all households were made up of individuals and 13.2% had someone living alone who was 65 years of age or older.

There were 11,979 housing units, of which 11.0% were vacant. Among occupied housing units, 65.9% were owner-occupied and 34.1% were renter-occupied. The homeowner vacancy rate was 1.7% and the rental vacancy rate was 7.7%.

=== Racial and ethnic composition ===
Pike County, Ohio – Racial and ethnic composition Note: the US Census treats Hispanic/Latino as an ethnic category. This table excludes Latinos from the racial categories and assigns them to a separate category. Hispanics/Latinos may be of any race.
Race / ethnicity (NH = Non-Hispanic)	Pop 1980	Pop 1990	Pop 2000	Pop 2010	Pop 2020	% 1980	% 1990	% 2000	% 2010	% 2020
White alone (NH)	22,365	23,736	26,666	27,610	25,470	98.08%	97.88%	96.28%	96.17%	94.03%
Black or African American alone (NH)	242	327	240	251	190	1.06%	1.35%	0.87%	0.87%	0.70%
Native American or Alaska Native alone (NH)	34	71	196	138	110	0.15%	0.29%	0.71%	0.48%	0.41%
Asian alone (NH)	35	40	51	55	70	0.15%	0.16%	0.18%	0.19%	0.26%
Native Hawaiian or Pacific Islander alone (NH)	x	x	10	3	6	x	x	0.04%	0.01%	0.02%
Other race alone (NH)	17	1	9	14	44	0.07%	0.00%	0.03%	0.05%	0.16%
Mixed race or Multiracial (NH)	x	x	368	431	979	x	x	1.33%	1.50%	3.61%
Hispanic or Latino (any race)	109	74	155	207	219	0.48%	0.31%	0.56%	0.72%	0.81%
Total	22,802	24,249	27,695	28,709	27,088	100.00%	100.00%	100.00%	100.00%	100.00%

=== 2010 census ===
As of the 2010 United States census, there were 28,709 people, 11,012 households, and 7,743 families living in the county. The population density was 65.2 inhabitants per square mile (25.2/km^{2}). There were 12,481 housing units at an average density of 28.3 units per square mile (10.9 units/km^{2}). The racial makeup of the county was 96.6% white, 0.9% black or African American, 0.5% American Indian, 0.2% Asian, 0.2% from other races, and 1.6% from two or more races. Those of Hispanic or Latino origin made up 0.7% of the population. In terms of ancestry, 19.3% were German, 14.8% were Irish, 12.9% were English, and 12.5% were American.

Of the 11,012 households, 34.6% had children under the age of 18 living with them, 51.2% were married couples living together, 13.1% had a female householder with no husband present, 29.7% were non-families, and 25.1% of all households were made up of individuals. The average household size was 2.56 and the average family size was 3.02. The median age was 39.2 years.

The median income for a household in the county was $35,912 and the median income for a family was $43,010. Males had a median income of $40,645 versus $27,422 for females. The per capita income for the county was $17,494. About 18.0% of families and 23.6% of the population were below the poverty line, including 32.7% of those under age 18 and 15.2% of those age 65 or over.

=== 2000 census ===
As of the census of 2000, there were 27,695 people, 10,444 households, and 7,665 families living in the county. The population density was 63 people per square mile (24 people/km^{2}). There were 11,602 housing units at an average density of 26 units per square mile (10/km^{2}). The racial makeup of the county was 96.72% White, 0.89% Black or African American, 0.74% Native American, 0.18% Asian, 0.04% Pacific Islander, 0.07% from other races, and 1.36% from two or more races. 0.56% of the population were Hispanic or Latino of any race.

There were 10,444 households, out of which 35.50% had children under the age of 18 living with them, 56.80% were married couples living together, 11.90% had a female householder with no husband present, and 26.60% were non-families. 22.80% of all households were made up of individuals, and 10.40% had someone living alone who was 65 years of age or older. The average household size was 2.61 and the average family size was 3.04.

In the county, the population was spread out, with 27.20% under the age of 18, 8.90% from 18 to 24, 28.90% from 25 to 44, 21.50% from 45 to 64, and 13.60% who were 65 years of age or older. The median age was 35 years. For every 100 females there were 95.40 males. For every 100 females age 18 and over, there were 92.50 males.

The median income for a household in the county was $31,649, and the median income for a family was $35,934. Males had a median income of $32,379 versus $20,761 for females. The per capita income for the county was $16,093. About 15.10% of families and 18.60% of the population were below the poverty line, including 23.20% of those under age 18 and 13.60% of those age 65 or over.

== Government ==
The Garnet A. Wilson Public Library serves area communities from its main branch in Waverly, Ohio and from its branches in Beaver, Piketon, and Western Pike County.

In 2005, the library loaned more than 238,000 items to its 20,000 cardholders. Total holding are over 91,000 volumes with over 210 periodical subscriptions.

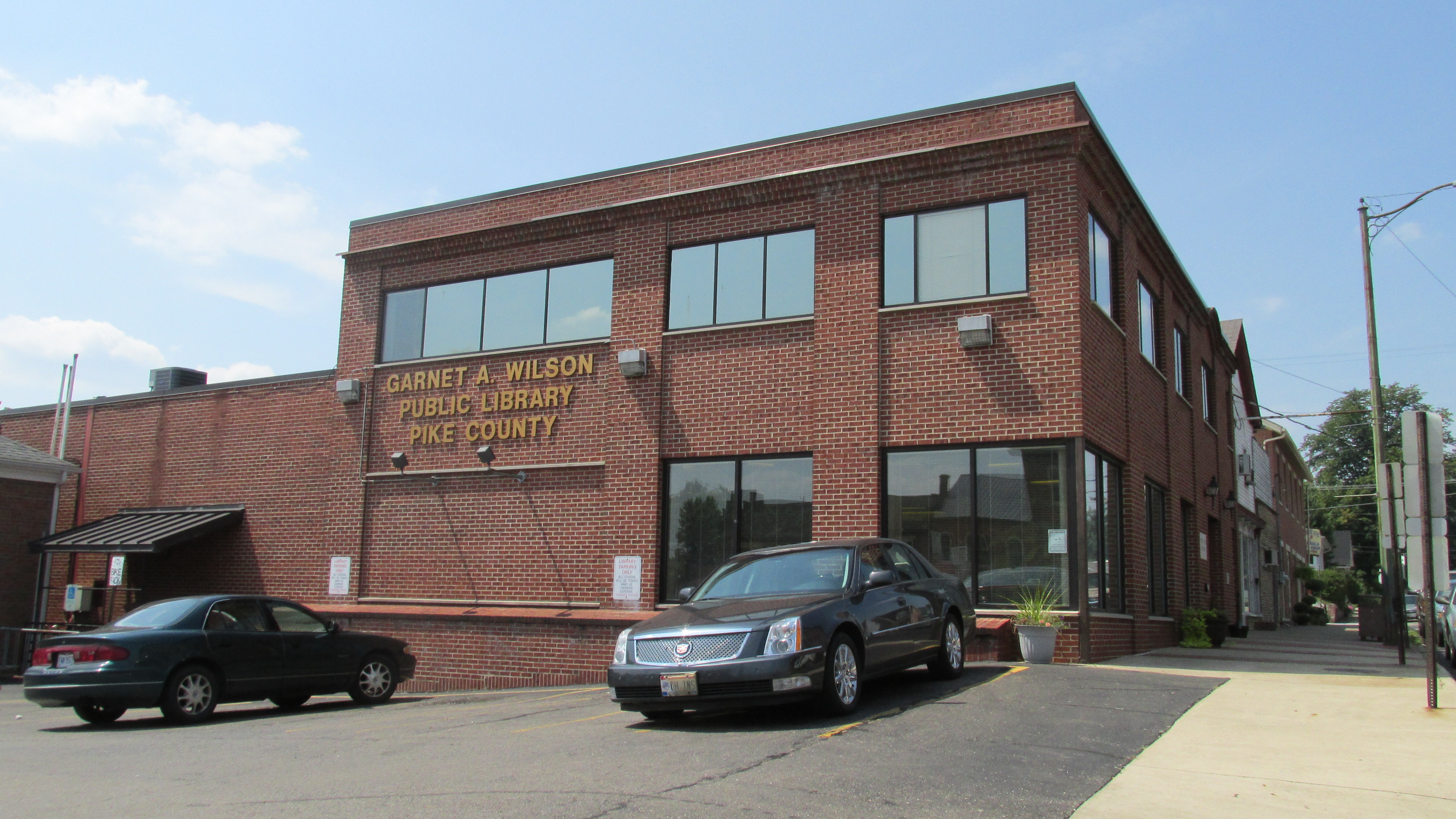
Waverly Library

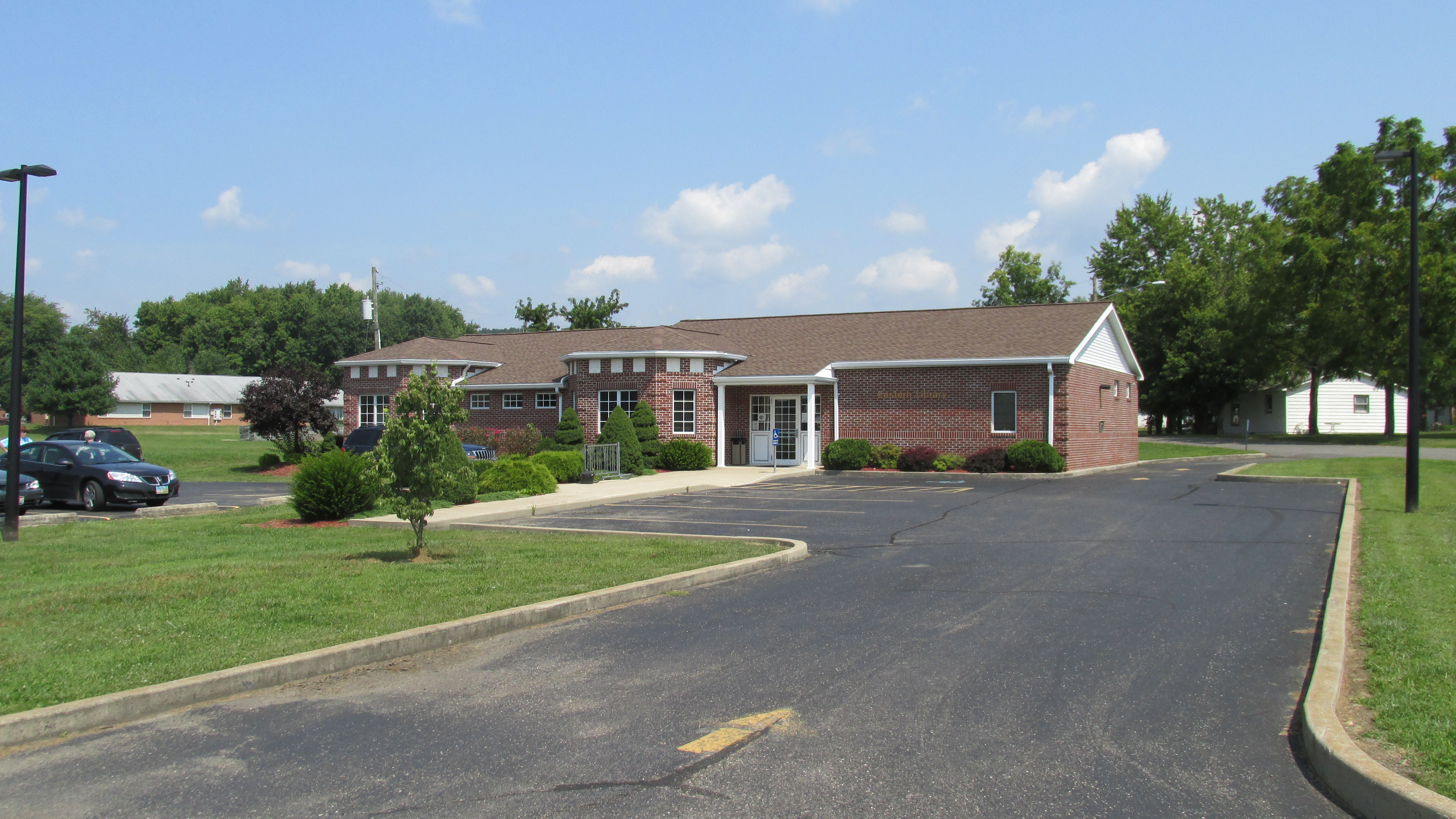
Beaver Library

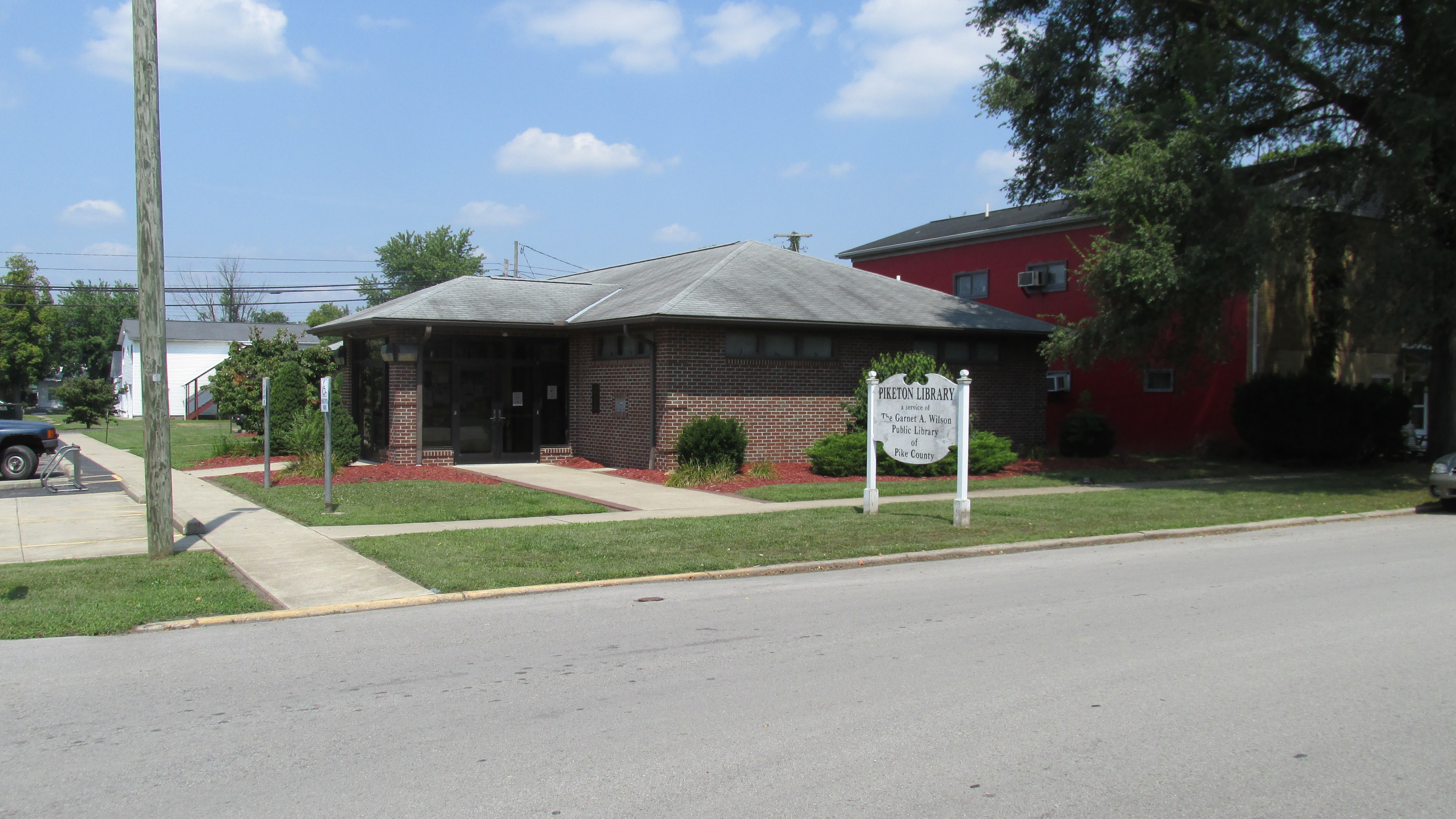
Piketon Library

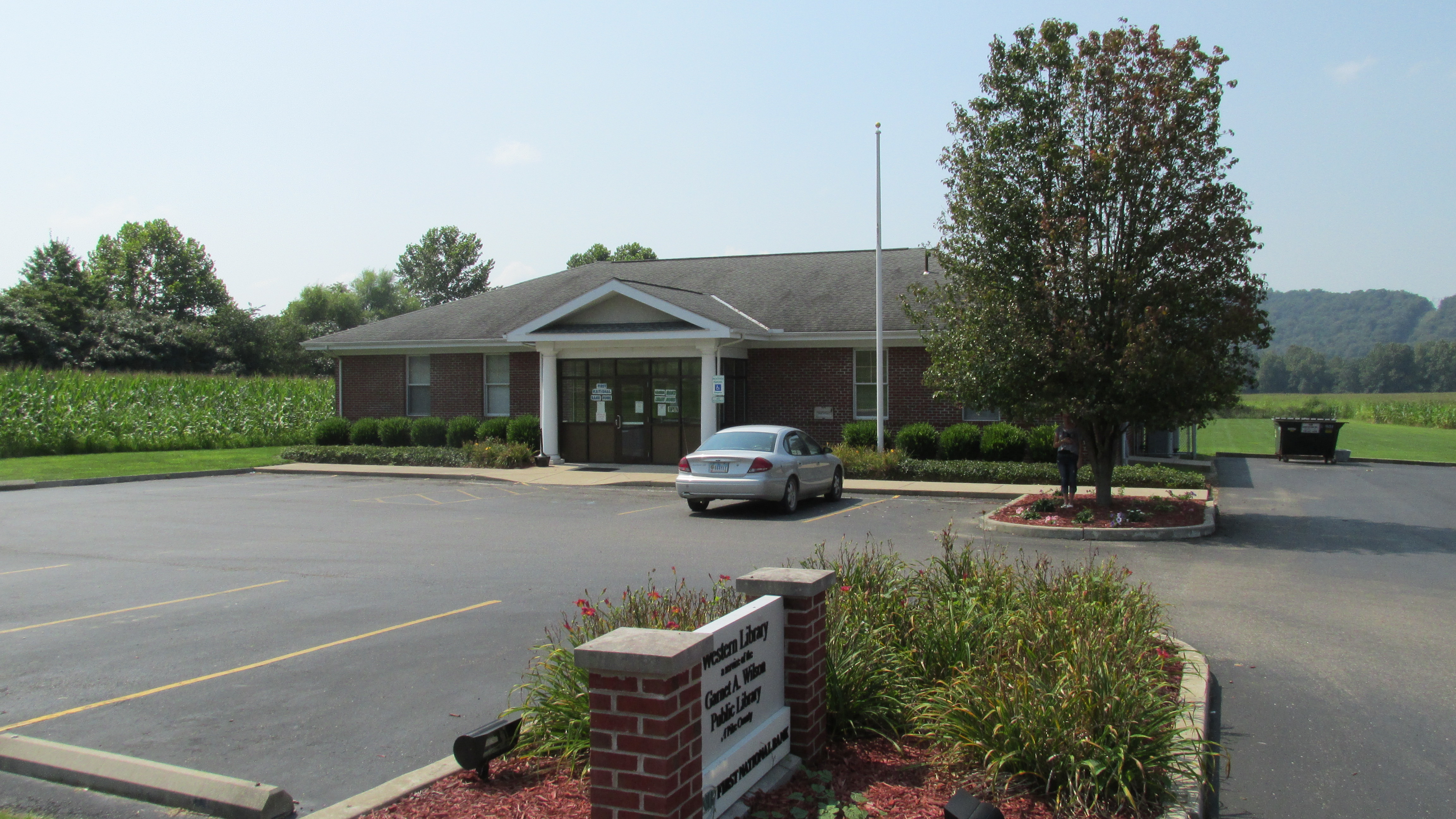
Western Pike Library

Pike County has adopted a county flag with an unusual shape, rounded at the fly end. It bears fourteen stars, representing the county's townships, and various industry symbols within a circular emblem, all upon a green field. The flag is through and through except for the emblem.

== Politics ==
Pike County used to be very strongly Democratic in presidential elections, being the only county in the state to vote for Adlai Stevenson in 1956. Bill Clinton in 1996 was the last Democrat to win the county; afterwards, Barack Obama lost the county by only one vote in 2012, the closest a Democrat came to winning the county since 1996. In 2016, the county took a sharp turn to the right as Republican Donald Trump won over 65% of the vote in the county; he went on to win over 70% of the vote in both 2020 and 2024. Overall, Pike County shifted to the right from 2012 to 2024 by 54 percentage points, representing one of the strongest such rightward shifts for any county in the country.

United States presidential election results for Pike County, Ohio
Year	Republican		Democratic		Third party(ies)	
Year	No.	%	No.	%	No.	%
1856	523	25.23%	1,175	56.68%	375	18.09%
1860	958	38.44%	1,397	56.06%	137	5.50%
1864	1,048	41.24%	1,493	58.76%	0	0.00%
1868	1,155	40.08%	1,727	59.92%	0	0.00%
1872	1,284	45.01%	1,568	54.96%	1	0.04%
1876	1,465	41.14%	2,096	58.86%	0	0.00%
1880	1,756	44.16%	2,192	55.13%	28	0.70%
1884	1,792	43.78%	2,238	54.68%	63	1.54%
1888	1,769	43.90%	2,162	53.65%	99	2.46%
1892	1,686	44.47%	1,926	50.80%	179	4.72%
1896	2,228	50.64%	2,145	48.75%	27	0.61%
1900	2,342	53.98%	1,960	45.17%	37	0.85%
1904	1,818	45.69%	2,090	52.53%	71	1.78%
1908	1,798	45.54%	2,085	52.81%	65	1.65%
1912	1,184	34.45%	1,691	49.20%	562	16.35%
1916	1,616	43.06%	2,091	55.72%	46	1.23%
1920	3,075	52.08%	2,799	47.41%	30	0.51%
1924	2,569	43.87%	3,185	54.39%	102	1.74%
1928	3,246	54.51%	2,709	45.49%	0	0.00%
1932	2,743	34.69%	5,107	64.58%	58	0.73%
1936	2,953	35.82%	5,287	64.13%	4	0.05%
1940	3,165	38.94%	4,962	61.06%	0	0.00%
1944	3,117	43.99%	3,968	56.01%	0	0.00%
1948	2,639	36.85%	4,516	63.06%	6	0.08%
1952	2,982	43.37%	3,893	56.63%	0	0.00%
1956	3,447	47.15%	3,863	52.85%	0	0.00%
1960	3,684	45.92%	4,339	54.08%	0	0.00%
1964	2,567	32.50%	5,331	67.50%	0	0.00%
1968	3,247	40.01%	3,445	42.45%	1,423	17.54%
1972	5,037	57.49%	3,531	40.30%	193	2.20%
1976	3,729	38.95%	5,734	59.89%	111	1.16%
1980	4,426	45.08%	4,938	50.30%	454	4.62%
1984	6,318	55.90%	4,895	43.31%	89	0.79%
1988	5,611	51.39%	5,191	47.54%	117	1.07%
1992	4,094	35.93%	5,057	44.39%	2,242	19.68%
1996	3,759	34.85%	5,542	51.38%	1,486	13.78%
2000	5,333	50.50%	4,923	46.62%	304	2.88%
2004	6,520	51.84%	5,989	47.62%	67	0.53%
2008	6,162	49.27%	6,033	48.24%	311	2.49%
2012	5,685	49.03%	5,684	49.02%	227	1.96%
2016	7,902	66.12%	3,539	29.61%	510	4.27%
2020	9,157	73.70%	3,110	25.03%	157	1.26%
2024	9,352	76.39%	2,793	22.81%	97	0.79%

United States Senate election results for Pike County, Ohio1
Year	Republican		Democratic		Third party(ies)	
Year	No.	%	No.	%	No.	%
2024	8,264	68.62%	3,364	27.93%	415	3.45%

== Transportation ==
The Pike County Airport is located three nautical miles (3.5 mi; 5.6 km) northeast of Waverly's central business district.

== Communities ==
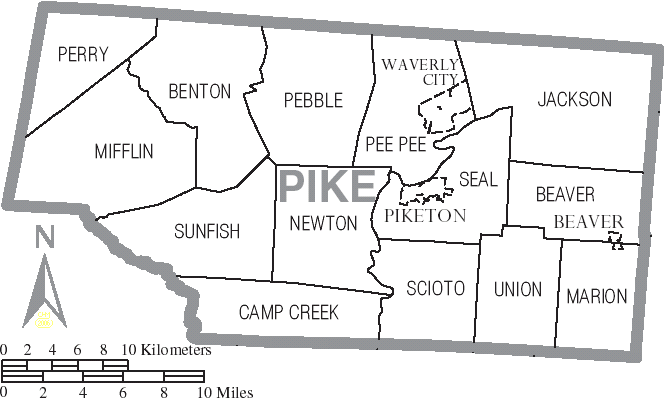
Map of Pike County, Ohio with municipal and township labels

=== City ===
- Waverly (county seat)

=== Villages ===
- Beaver
- Piketon

=== Townships ===
- Beaver
- Benton
- Camp Creek
- Jackson
- Marion
- Mifflin
- Newton
- Pebble
- Pee Pee
- Perry
- Scioto
- Seal
- Sunfish
- Union

=== Census-designated places ===
- Cynthiana
- Stockdale

=== Unincorporated communities ===
- Arkoe
- Buchanan
- Byington (Mifflin Township seat)
- Camp
- Daleyville
- Idaho
- Jasper
- Latham
- Morgantown
- Omega
- Sargents
- Wakefield

== See also ==
- National Register of Historic Places listings in Pike County, Ohio
