= Perry Township, Ohio =

Perry Township, Ohio may refer to:

- Perry Township, Allen County, Ohio
- Perry Township, Ashland County, Ohio
- Perry Township, Brown County, Ohio
- Perry Township, Carroll County, Ohio
- Perry Township, Columbiana County, Ohio
- Perry Township, Coshocton County, Ohio
- Perry Township, Fayette County, Ohio
- Perry Township, Franklin County, Ohio
- Perry Township, Gallia County, Ohio
- Perry Township, Hocking County, Ohio
- Perry Township, Lake County, Ohio
- Perry Township, Lawrence County, Ohio
- Perry Township, Licking County, Ohio
- Perry Township, Logan County, Ohio
- Perry Township, Monroe County, Ohio
- Perry Township, Montgomery County, Ohio
- Perry Township, Morrow County, Ohio
- Perry Township, Muskingum County, Ohio
- Perry Township, Pickaway County, Ohio
- Perry Township, Pike County, Ohio
- Perry Township, Putnam County, Ohio
- Perry Township, Richland County, Ohio
- Perry Township, Shelby County, Ohio
- Perry Township, Stark County, Ohio
- Perry Township, Tuscarawas County, Ohio
- Perry Township, Wood County, Ohio

== See also ==
- Perry Township (disambiguation)
