= Perry Township, Pike County, Ohio =

Township in Ohio, US

- Township
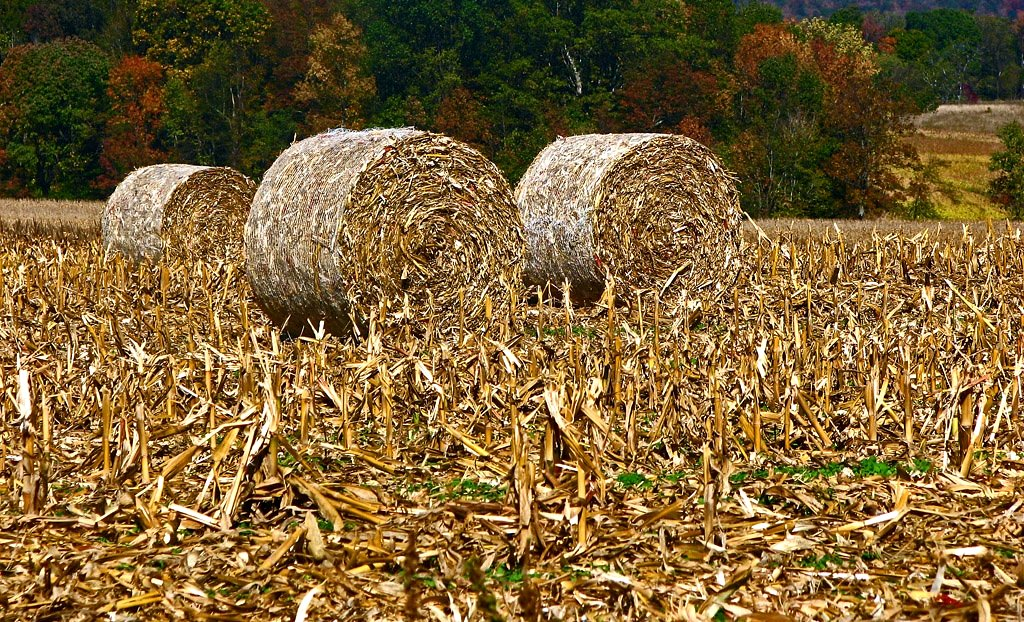
- Baled corn in a field in Perry Township

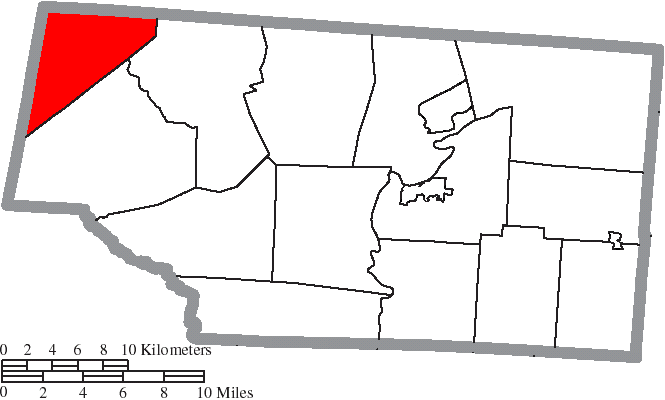
- Location of Perry Township in Pike County
- Coordinates: 39°9′43″N 83°20′2″W
- Country: United States
- State: Ohio
- County: Pike

Area
  - Total: 23.0 sq mi (59.5 km^{2})
  - Land: 23.0 sq mi (59.5 km^{2})
  - Water: 0 sq mi (0.0 km^{2})
- Elevation: 922 ft (281 m)

Population (2020)
  - Total: 915
  - Density: 39.8/sq mi (15.4/km^{2})
- Time zone: UTC-5 (Eastern (EST))
  - Summer (DST): UTC-4 (EDT)
- FIPS code: 39-62022
- GNIS feature ID: 1086816

Perry Township is one of the fourteen townships of Pike County, Ohio, United States. The 2020 census found 915 people in the township.

== Geography ==
Located in the northwestern corner of the county, it borders the following townships:

- Paxton Township, Ross County - north
- Benton Township - east
- Mifflin Township - southeast
- Brushcreek Township, Highland County - west
- Paint Township, Highland County - northwest

No municipalities are located in Perry Township, although the census-designated place of Cynthiana lies in the northwestern part of the township.

== Name and history ==
It is one of twenty-six Perry Townships statewide.

== Government ==
The township is governed by a three-member board of trustees, who are elected in November of odd-numbered years to a four-year term beginning on the following January 1. Two are elected in the year after the presidential election and one is elected in the year before it. There is also an elected township fiscal officer, who serves a four-year term beginning on April 1 of the year after the election, which is held in November of the year before the presidential election. Vacancies in the fiscal officership or on the board of trustees are filled by the remaining trustees.
