= Benton Township, Pike County, Ohio =

Township in Ohio, US

- Township
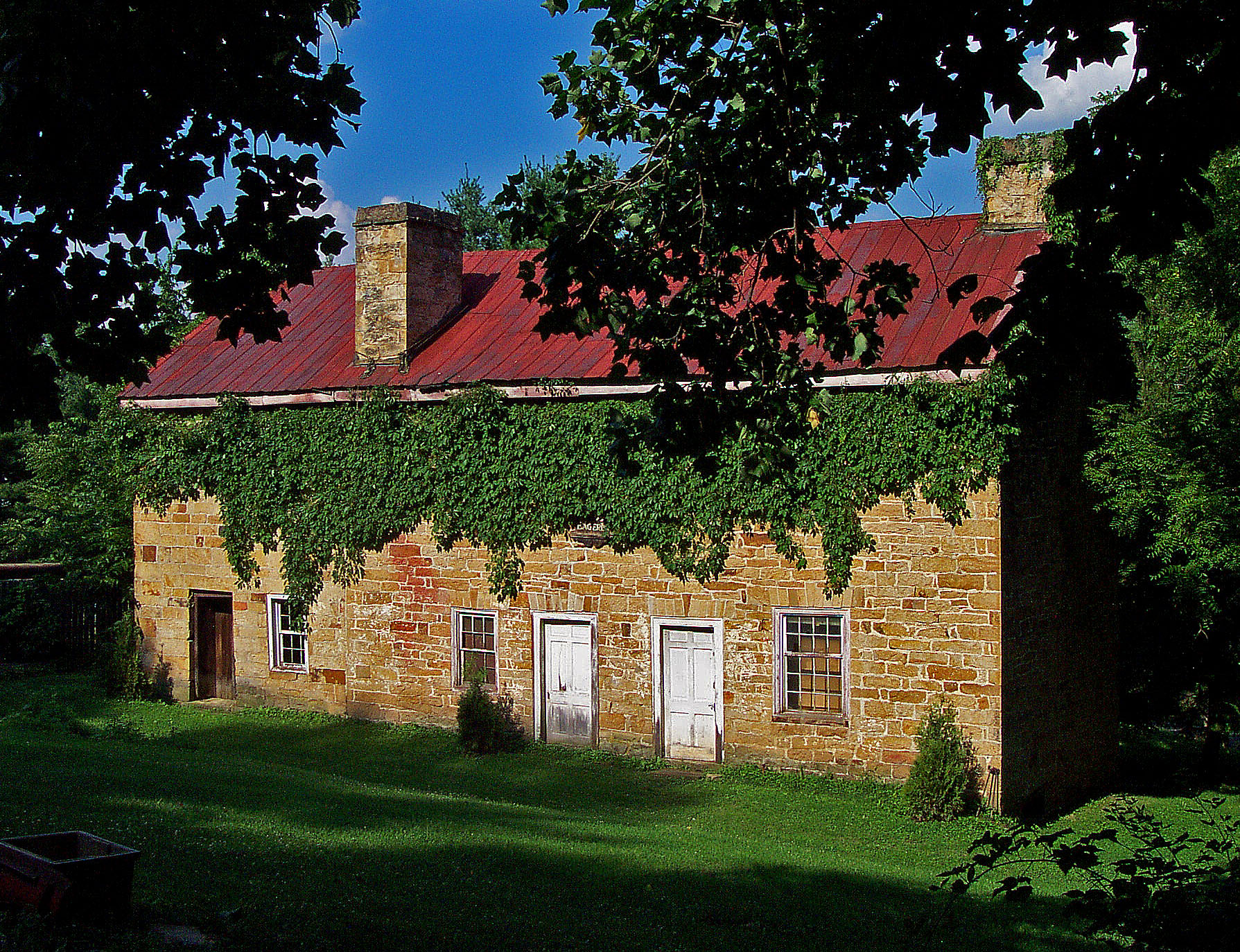
- Eager Inn, a historic site in the township

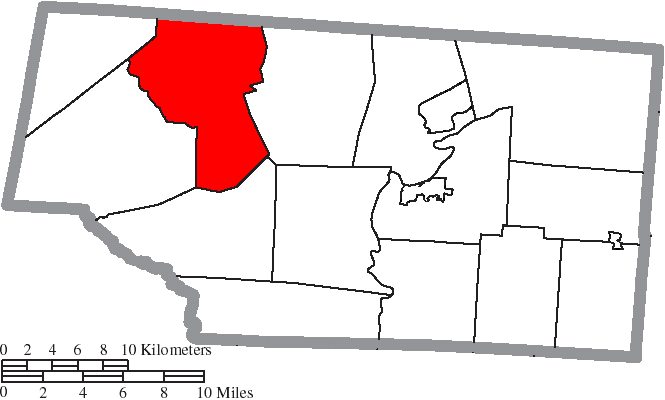
- Location of Benton Township in Pike County
- Coordinates: 39°7′17″N 83°11′36″W
- Country: United States
- State: Ohio
- County: Pike

Area
  - Total: 38.6 sq mi (100.1 km^{2})
  - Land: 38.6 sq mi (100.1 km^{2})
  - Water: 0 sq mi (0.0 km^{2})
- Elevation: 610 ft (186 m)

Population (2020)
  - Total: 1,583
  - Density: 40.96/sq mi (15.81/km^{2})
- Time zone: UTC-5 (Eastern (EST))
  - Summer (DST): UTC-4 (EDT)
- FIPS code: 39-05648
- GNIS feature ID: 1086808

Benton Township is one of the fourteen townships of Pike County, Ohio, United States. The 2020 census found 1,583 people in the township.

== Geography ==
Located in the northwestern part of the county, it borders the following townships:

- Paxton Township, Ross County - north
- Twin Township, Ross County - northeast
- Pebble Township - east
- Sunfish Township - south
- Mifflin Township - west
- Perry Township - northwest

No municipalities are located in Benton Township, although the unincorporated community of Morgantown lies in the township's center.

== Name and history ==
Statewide, other Benton Townships are located in Hocking, Monroe, Ottawa, and Paulding counties.

== Government ==
The township is governed by a three-member board of trustees, who are elected in November of odd-numbered years to a four-year term beginning on the following January 1. Two are elected in the year after the presidential election and one is elected in the year before it. There is also an elected township fiscal officer, who serves a four-year term beginning on April 1 of the year after the election, which is held in November of the year before the presidential election. Vacancies in the fiscal officership or on the board of trustees are filled by the remaining trustees.
