= Camp, Ohio =

Unincorporated community in Ohio, U.S.

Coordinates: 38°58′25″N 83°06′55″W

Camp is an unincorporated community in Pike County, in the U.S. state of Ohio.

== History ==
A post office called Camp was established in 1890, and remained in operation until 1950. The community derives its name from nearby Camp Creek.
