= Sargents, Ohio =

Unincorporated community in Ohio, U.S.

Coordinates: 39°00′12″N 83°01′23″W

Sargents is an unincorporated community in Pike County, Ohio, United States. The closest highway is U.S. Route 23, the main street is Wakefield Mound Road, and the closest town is Piketon.

Sargents is named after the Sargent brothers who came from Maryland in the 1790s. They worked to start a station for liberated slaves in Ohio, which later became later part of the underground Railroad.

== See also ==
- Waverly, Ohio
- Portsmouth Gaseous Diffusion Plant
- Piketon Mounds
