= Idaho, Ohio =

Unincorporated community in Ohio, U.S.

Coordinates: 39°05′17″N 83°08′31″W

Idaho is an unincorporated community in Pike County, in the U.S. state of Ohio.

== History ==
A post office called Idaho was established in 1870, and remained in operation until 1964. The community was named after the Idaho Territory.
