= 1956 United States presidential election in Ohio =

- November 6, 1956

Nominee	Dwight D. Eisenhower	Adlai E. Stevenson
Party	Republican	Democratic
Home state	Pennsylvania	Illinois
Running mate	Richard Nixon	Estes Kefauver
Electoral vote	25	0
Popular vote	2,262,610	1,439,655
Percentage	61.11%	38.89%

Eisenhower
50–60%
60–70%
70–80%
80–90%
90–100%
Stevenson
50–60%
60–70%
70–80%
Tie
President before election
Dwight D. Eisenhower
Republican
Elected President
Dwight D. Eisenhower
Republican

The 1956 United States presidential election in Ohio took place on November 6, 1956, throughout all 48 states, which was part of the 1956 United States presidential election. Voters chose 25 representatives, or electors to the Electoral College, who voted for President and Vice President.

Ohio was won by the Republican Party candidate, incumbent President Dwight D. Eisenhower. He won all counties except for Pike County.

== Results ==
1956 United States presidential election in Ohio
Party	Candidate	Running mate	Votes	Percentage	Electoral votes
Republican	Dwight D. Eisenhower (incumbent)	Richard Nixon (incumbent)	2,262,610	61.11%	25
Democratic	Adlai Stevenson II	Estes Kefauver	1,439,655	38.89%	0
Totals			3,702,265	100.00%	25

=== Results by county ===
County	Dwight D. Eisenhower Republican		Adlai Stevenson Democratic		Margin		Total votes cast
County	#	%	#	%	#	%	Total votes cast
Adams	5,637	59.14%	3,894	40.86%	1,743	18.28%	9,531
Allen	28,388	70.22%	12,042	29.78%	16,346	40.44%	40,430
Ashland	12,792	73.41%	4,634	26.59%	8,158	46.82%	17,426
Ashtabula	24,165	64.68%	13,195	35.32%	10,970	29.36%	37,360
Athens	10,794	64.43%	5,959	35.57%	4,835	28.86%	16,753
Auglaize	11,453	72.07%	4,438	27.93%	7,015	44.14%	15,891
Belmont	19,230	50.31%	18,991	49.69%	239	0.62%	38,221
Brown	5,690	56.70%	4,346	43.30%	1,344	13.40%	10,036
Butler	41,785	63.20%	24,331	36.80%	17,454	26.40%	66,116
Carroll	5,916	69.55%	2,590	30.45%	3,326	39.10%	8,506
Champaign	8,767	69.48%	3,851	30.52%	4,916	38.96%	12,618
Clark	28,767	61.94%	17,680	38.06%	11,087	23.88%	46,447
Clermont	14,914	62.30%	9,026	37.70%	5,888	24.60%	23,940
Clinton	7,919	70.07%	3,382	29.93%	4,537	40.14%	11,301
Columbiana	28,783	66.47%	14,516	33.53%	14,267	32.94%	43,299
Coshocton	9,549	66.60%	4,789	33.40%	4,760	33.20%	14,338
Crawford	13,763	70.46%	5,769	29.54%	7,994	40.92%	19,532
Cuyahoga	353,474	53.72%	304,558	46.28%	48,916	7.44%	658,032
Darke	13,447	65.32%	7,138	34.68%	6,309	30.64%	20,585
Defiance	8,786	69.03%	3,941	30.97%	4,845	38.06%	12,727
Delaware	10,739	72.88%	3,997	27.12%	6,742	45.76%	14,736
Erie	14,771	70.18%	6,276	29.82%	8,495	40.36%	21,047
Fairfield	15,647	65.24%	8,337	34.76%	7,310	30.48%	23,984
Fayette	6,696	66.00%	3,449	34.00%	3,247	32.00%	10,145
Franklin	151,544	65.78%	78,852	34.22%	72,692	31.56%	230,396
Fulton	9,030	77.50%	2,622	22.50%	6,408	55.00%	11,652
Gallia	7,040	70.99%	2,877	29.01%	4,163	41.98%	9,917
Geauga	10,971	69.49%	4,818	30.51%	6,153	38.98%	15,789
Greene	15,471	61.07%	9,861	38.93%	5,610	22.14%	25,332
Guernsey	10,224	66.51%	5,149	33.49%	5,075	33.02%	15,373
Hamilton	222,009	66.11%	113,797	33.89%	108,212	32.22%	335,806
Hancock	15,713	74.82%	5,289	25.18%	10,424	49.64%	21,002
Hardin	9,049	66.51%	4,556	33.49%	4,493	33.02%	13,605
Harrison	5,444	65.79%	2,831	34.21%	2,613	31.58%	8,275
Henry	8,164	74.63%	2,775	25.37%	5,389	49.26%	10,939
Highland	8,397	63.50%	4,826	36.50%	3,571	27.00%	13,223
Hocking	4,925	59.63%	3,334	40.37%	1,591	19.26%	8,259
Holmes	3,955	68.78%	1,795	31.22%	2,160	37.56%	5,750
Huron	12,208	73.43%	4,418	26.57%	7,790	46.86%	16,626
Jackson	8,106	64.65%	4,432	35.35%	3,674	29.30%	12,538
Jefferson	22,162	50.52%	21,703	49.48%	459	1.04%	43,865
Knox	12,347	71.35%	4,958	28.65%	7,389	42.70%	17,305
Lake	31,017	61.14%	19,718	38.86%	11,299	22.28%	50,735
Lawrence	12,607	62.72%	7,492	37.28%	5,115	25.44%	20,099
Licking	21,912	67.44%	10,581	32.56%	11,331	34.88%	32,493
Logan	11,229	72.66%	4,226	27.34%	7,003	45.32%	15,455
Lorain	40,340	60.11%	26,774	39.89%	13,566	20.22%	67,114
Lucas	100,501	53.15%	88,598	46.85%	11,903	6.30%	189,099
Madison	6,483	69.28%	2,875	30.72%	3,608	38.56%	9,358
Mahoning	63,992	51.98%	59,126	48.02%	4,866	3.96%	123,118
Marion	15,125	67.07%	7,425	32.93%	7,700	34.14%	22,550
Medina	15,155	70.42%	6,365	29.58%	8,790	40.84%	21,520
Meigs	6,593	70.32%	2,783	29.68%	3,810	40.64%	9,376
Mercer	9,456	68.88%	4,272	31.12%	5,184	37.76%	13,728
Miami	20,135	68.57%	9,229	31.43%	10,906	37.14%	29,364
Monroe	3,738	59.18%	2,578	40.82%	1,160	18.36%	6,316
Montgomery	107,278	58.45%	76,270	41.55%	31,008	16.90%	183,548
Morgan	4,134	73.82%	1,466	26.18%	2,668	47.64%	5,600
Morrow	5,885	71.56%	2,339	28.44%	3,546	43.12%	8,224
Muskingum	22,788	69.27%	10,110	30.73%	12,678	38.54%	32,898
Noble	3,861	66.52%	1,943	33.48%	1,918	33.04%	5,804
Ottawa	8,806	62.98%	5,176	37.02%	3,630	25.96%	13,982
Paulding	4,885	69.24%	2,170	30.76%	2,715	38.48%	7,055
Perry	7,511	64.56%	4,123	35.44%	3,388	29.12%	11,634
Pickaway	6,956	60.67%	4,509	39.33%	2,447	21.34%	11,465
Pike	3,447	47.15%	3,863	52.85%	-416	-5.70%	7,310
Portage	18,943	59.07%	13,128	40.93%	5,815	18.14%	32,071
Preble	8,099	63.91%	4,574	36.09%	3,525	27.82%	12,673
Putnam	8,408	70.38%	3,538	29.62%	4,870	40.76%	11,946
Richland	26,098	65.78%	13,578	34.22%	12,520	31.56%	39,676
Ross	13,036	63.73%	7,418	36.27%	5,618	27.46%	20,454
Sandusky	15,009	72.52%	5,687	27.48%	9,322	45.04%	20,696
Scioto	22,110	59.60%	14,985	40.40%	7,125	19.20%	37,095
Seneca	17,728	73.90%	6,260	26.10%	11,468	47.80%	23,988
Shelby	9,452	67.67%	4,515	32.33%	4,937	35.34%	13,967
Stark	83,667	62.85%	49,445	37.15%	34,222	25.70%	133,112
Summit	102,872	52.42%	93,378	47.58%	9,494	4.84%	196,250
Trumbull	43,936	57.17%	32,913	42.83%	11,023	14.34%	76,849
Tuscarawas	19,876	60.63%	12,908	39.37%	6,968	21.26%	32,784
Union	7,575	74.06%	2,653	25.94%	4,922	48.12%	10,228
Van Wert	9,834	70.03%	4,208	29.97%	5,626	40.06%	14,042
Vinton	2,998	61.01%	1,916	38.99%	1,082	22.02%	4,914
Warren	13,673	65.53%	7,193	34.47%	6,480	31.06%	20,866
Washington	13,927	69.65%	6,068	30.35%	7,859	39.30%	19,995
Wayne	19,469	73.60%	6,984	26.40%	12,485	47.20%	26,453
Williams	9,784	75.21%	3,225	24.79%	6,559	50.42%	13,009
Wood	16,844	66.32%	8,553	33.68%	8,291	32.64%	25,397
Wyandot	6,807	73.18%	2,495	26.82%	4,312	46.36%	9,302
Totals	2,262,610	61.11%	1,439,655	38.89%	822,955	22.22%	3,702,265

==== Counties that flipped from Democratic to Republican ====
- Belmont
- Jefferson
- Mahoning
- Summit
- Trumbull

== See also ==
- United States presidential elections in Ohio
