= Pebble Township, Pike County, Ohio =

Township in Ohio, US

- Township
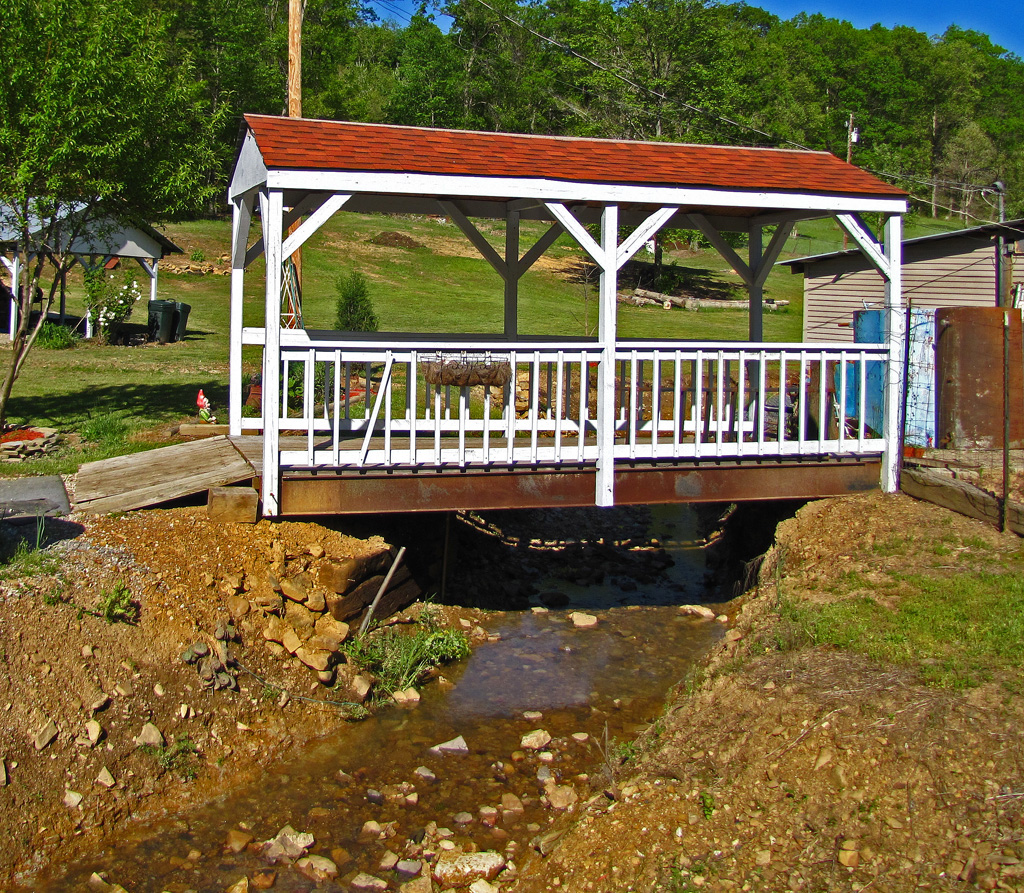
- Privately owned covered bridge along Copeland Road

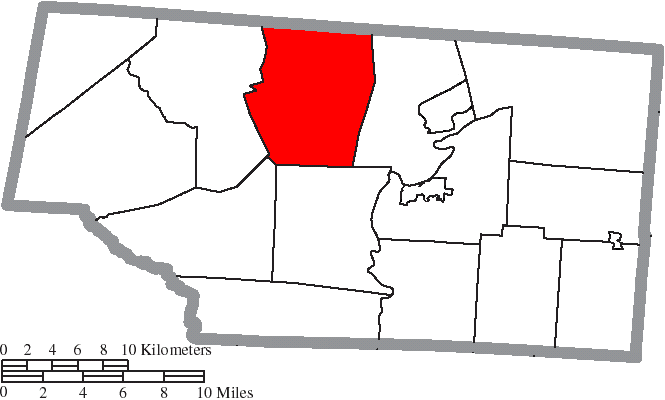
- Location of Pebble Township in Pike County
- Coordinates: 39°7′54″N 83°6′35″W
- Country: United States
- State: Ohio
- County: Pike

Area
  - Total: 36.8 sq mi (95.4 km^{2})
  - Land: 36.8 sq mi (95.4 km^{2})
  - Water: 0 sq mi (0.0 km^{2})
- Elevation: 682 ft (208 m)

Population (2020)
  - Total: 2,428
  - Density: 65.9/sq mi (25.5/km^{2})
- Time zone: UTC-5 (Eastern (EST))
  - Summer (DST): UTC-4 (EDT)
- FIPS code: 39-61392
- GNIS feature ID: 1086814

Pebble Township is one of the fourteen townships of Pike County, Ohio, United States. The 2020 census found 2,428 people in the township.

== Geography ==
Located in the northern part of the county, it borders the following townships:

- Huntington Township, Ross County - north
- Pee Pee Township - east
- Newton Township - south
- Sunfish Township - southwest
- Benton Township - west
- Twin Township, Ross County - northwest

No municipalities are located in Pebble Township.

== Name and history ==
It is the only Pebble Township statewide.

== Government ==
The township is governed by a three-member board of trustees, who are elected in November of odd-numbered years to a four-year term beginning on the following January 1. Two are elected in the year after the presidential election and one is elected in the year before it. There is also an elected township fiscal officer, who serves a four-year term beginning on April 1 of the year after the election, which is held in November of the year before the presidential election. Vacancies in the fiscal officership or on the board of trustees are filled by the remaining trustees.
