= Pike County Airport (Ohio) =

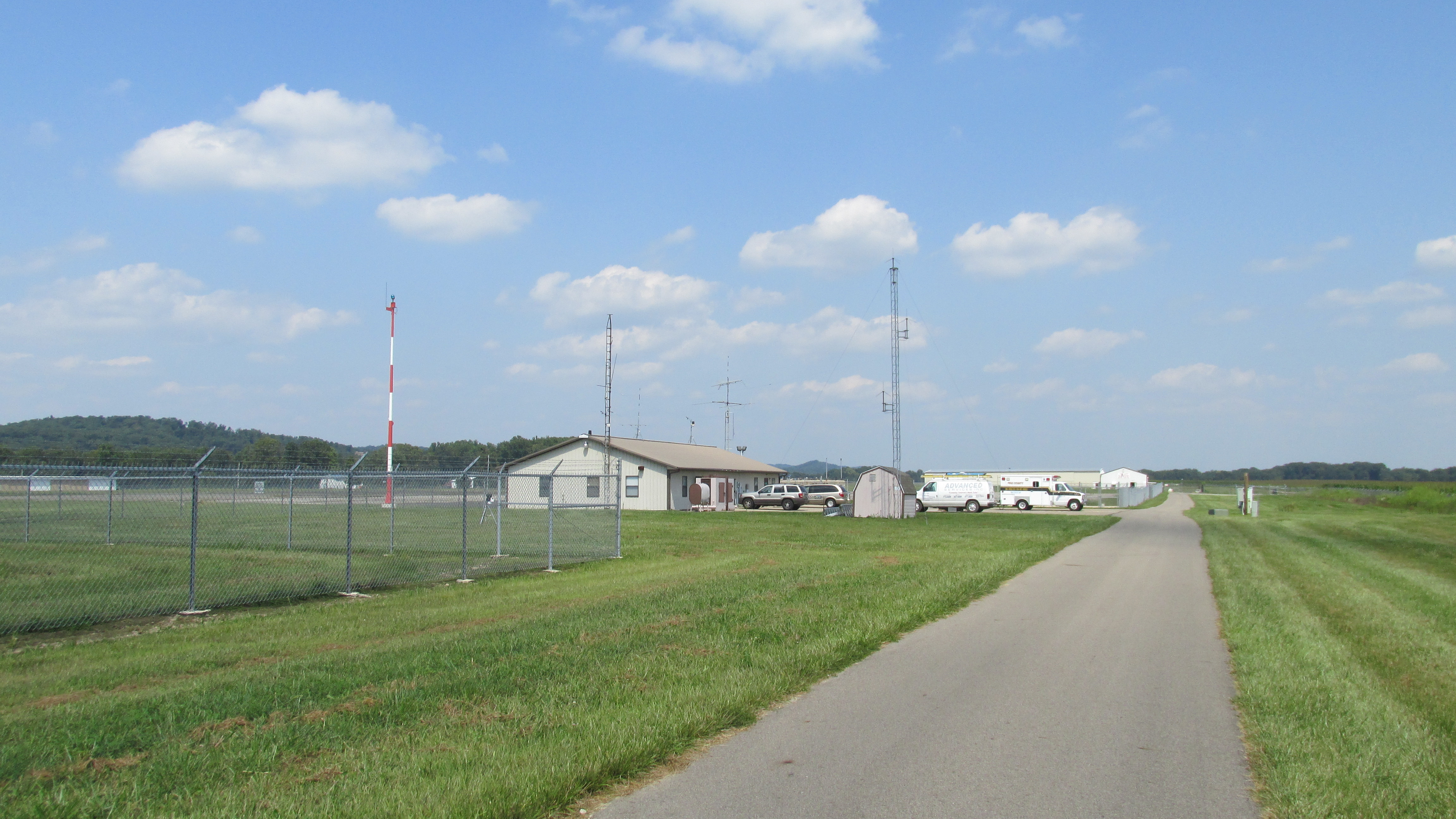
- Pike County Airport
- IATA: none; ICAO: KEOP; FAA LID: EOP

Summary
- Airport type: Public
- Owner: Pike County Airport Authority
- Serves: Pike County, Ohio
- Location: Waverly, Ohio
- Time zone: UTC−05:00 (-5)
  - Summer (DST): UTC−04:00 (-4)
- Elevation AMSL: 661 ft (201 m)
- Coordinates: 39°10′01″N 082°55′41″W
- Website: Pike County Airport

Map
- Location within Ohio Location within the United States

Runways
Direction	Length		Surface
Direction	ft	m	Surface
7/25	4,899	1,493	Asphalt

Statistics (2023)
- Aircraft operations (year ending 8/31/2023): 2,112
- Based aircraft: 10
- Source: Federal Aviation Administration

Pike County Airport (ICAO: KEOP, FAA LID: EOP) (Note: The airport formerly used the FAA location identifier I57.) is three miles northeast of Waverly, a village in Pike County, Ohio. The FAA's National Plan of Integrated Airport Systems for 2011–2015 categorized it as a general aviation facility.

Many U.S. airports use the same three-letter location identifier for the FAA and IATA, but this facility is EOP to the FAA and has no IATA code.

== History ==
The airport was funded largely by a bill signed by Governor James Rhodes, who believed every county in Ohio should have an airport.

Efforts to build an airport began in January 1966 with the establishment of an airport authority. A 54-acre (22 ha) site in an industrial park where a Thompson Industries factory was under construction was selected in June. However, the location was shifted to a location three miles north of Waverly by early November. A lawsuit objecting to the purchase of property for the airport was filed in February 1967. A price for the just over 67 acres (27 ha) was set the following month. The county accepted a contract from the Murray Construction Company to build a 3,500-foot (1,100 m) runway in June 1967. Although the runway had yet to be paved by February 1968, several airplanes had already landed on it. A plan to cooperate with Ross County on the airport was proposed in March 1968. It would see that county's $100,000 state grant being used to pay to extend the runway to 4,500 ft (1,400 m) or 5,000 ft (1,500 m). The airport was dedicated on 19 October 1969.

After initially proposing to lengthen it to 5,600 feet (1,700 m) the year before, the airport announced in April 1989 that it would be receiving a state grant to extend the runway by 700 ft (210 m). It received another grant the following year to install runway lighting.

A 3,240-square-foot (301 m^{2}) administration building was nearly complete in September 1995. Another effort to extend the runway to 5,400 feet (1,600 m) began in 1997.

== Facilities ==
Pike County Airport covers 70 acres (28 ha) at an elevation of 661 feet (202 m). Its one runway, 7/25, is 4,899 by 75 feet (1,493 x 23 m).

In the year ending August 31, 2023, the airport had 2,112 aircraft operations, average 40 per week: it was nearly 100% general aviation and <1% military. Ten aircraft were then based at the airport, all airplanes: 9 single-engine and 1 multi-engine.

== Accidents and incidents ==
- On 13 August 1969, a Beechcraft Baron crashed and burned at the airport while landing in fog, injuring the three occupants.
- On 4 August 1996, a Cessna 150 crashed into trees due to fog while attempting to land at the airport.

== See also ==
- List of airports in Ohio
