= Arkoe, Ohio =

Unincorporated community in the U.S. state of Ohio

Coordinates: 39°02′41″N 83°13′57″W

Arkoe is an unincorporated community in southwestern Pike County, in the U.S. state of Ohio.

A cemetery remains where the settlement presumably was.
