= Mifflin Township, Pike County, Ohio =

Township in Ohio, US

- Township
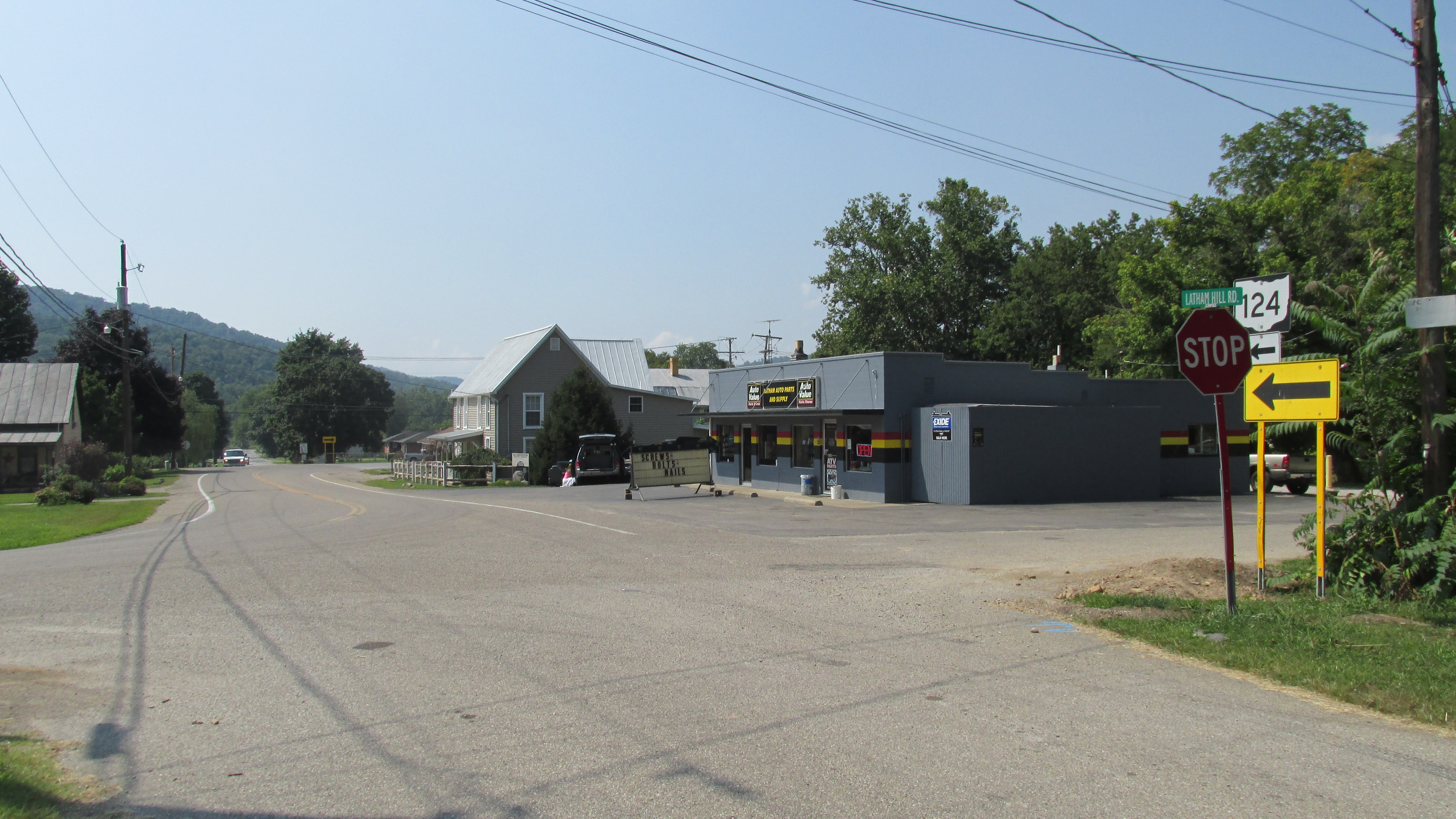
- Intersection at Latham

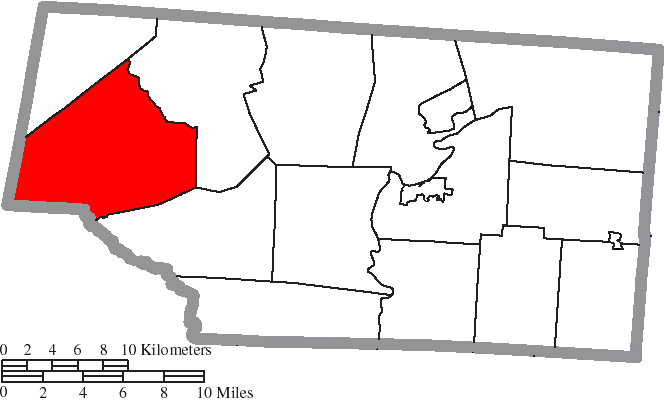
- Location of Mifflin Township in Pike County
- Coordinates: 39°5′15″N 83°17′57″W
- Country: United States
- State: Ohio
- County: Pike

Area
  - Total: 46.1 sq mi (119.5 km^{2})
  - Land: 46.1 sq mi (119.3 km^{2})
  - Water: 0.077 sq mi (0.2 km^{2})
- Elevation: 778 ft (237 m)

Population (2020)
  - Total: 1,210
  - Density: 26/sq mi (10.1/km^{2})
- Time zone: UTC-5 (Eastern (EST))
  - Summer (DST): UTC-4 (EDT)
- FIPS code: 39-50078
- GNIS feature ID: 1086812

Mifflin Township is one of the fourteen townships of Pike County, Ohio, United States. The 2020 census found 1,210 people in the township.

== Geography ==
Located in the southwestern corner part of the county, it borders the following townships:

- Benton Township - northeast
- Sunfish Township - southeast
- Franklin Township, Adams County - south
- Bratton Township, Adams County - southwest corner
- Brushcreek Township, Highland County - west
- Perry Township - northwest

No municipalities are located in Mifflin Township, although the unincorporated community of Latham lies in the eastern part of the township.

== Name and history ==
Statewide, other Mifflin Townships are located in Ashland, Franklin, Richland, and Wyandot counties.

== Government ==
The township is governed by a three-member board of trustees, who are elected in November of odd-numbered years to a four-year term beginning on the following January 1. Two are elected in the year after the presidential election and one is elected in the year before it. There is also an elected township fiscal officer, who serves a four-year term beginning on April 1 of the year after the election, which is held in November of the year before the presidential election. Vacancies in the fiscal officership or on the board of trustees are filled by the remaining trustees.
