= Mifflin Township, Richland County, Ohio =

Township in Ohio, US

- Township
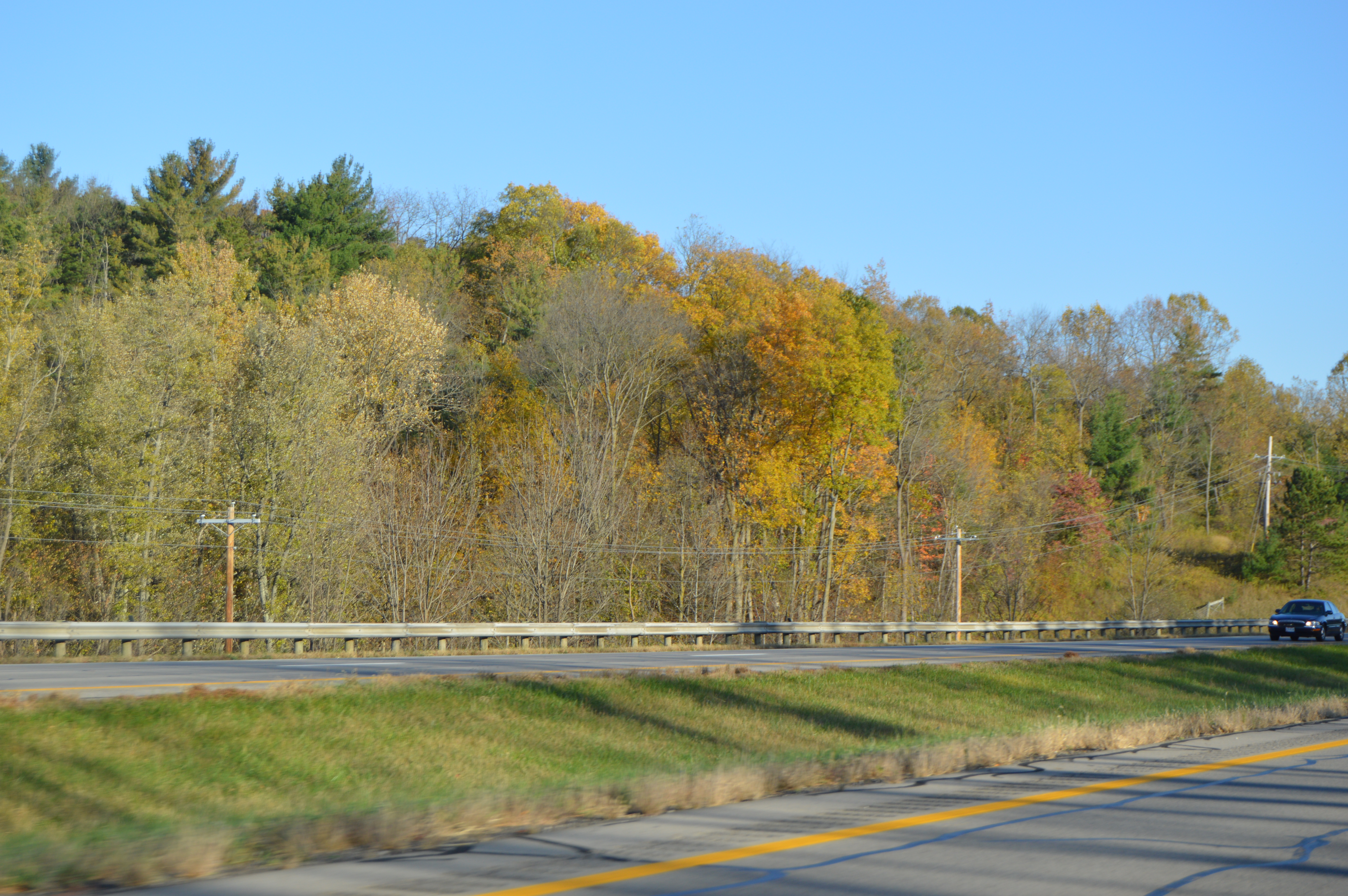
- Along U.S. Route 30 near Charles Mill Lake

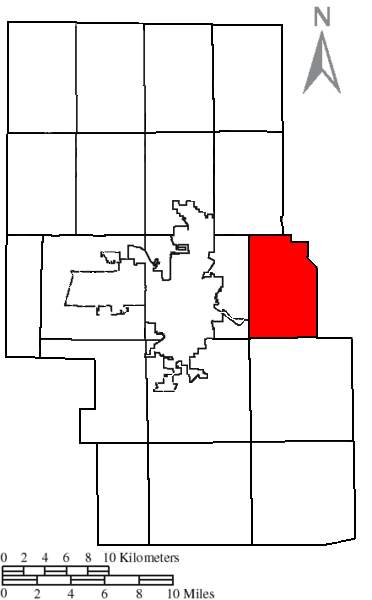
- Location of Mifflin Township in Richland County
- Coordinates: 40°46′28″N 82°25′31″W
- Country: United States
- State: Ohio
- County: Richland

Area
  - Total: 23.1 sq mi (59.7 km^{2})
  - Land: 22.0 sq mi (57.1 km^{2})
  - Water: 0.97 sq mi (2.5 km^{2})
- Elevation: 1,240 ft (378 m)

Population (2020)
  - Total: 6,106
  - Density: 277/sq mi (106.9/km^{2})
- Time zone: UTC-5 (Eastern (EST))
  - Summer (DST): UTC-4 (EDT)
- FIPS code: 39-50092
- GNIS feature ID: 1086880
- Website: https://sites.google.com/site/mifflintownshiprichlandcounty/

Mifflin Township is one of the eighteen townships of Richland County, Ohio, United States. It is a part of the Mansfield Metropolitan Statistical Area. The 2020 census found 6,106 people in the township.

== Geography ==
Located in the eastern part of the county, it borders the following townships:

- Weller Township – north
- Milton Township, Ashland County – northeast corner
- Mifflin Township, Ashland County – east
- Monroe Township – south
- Washington Township – southwest corner
- Madison Township – west

No municipalities are located in Mifflin Township.

== Name and history ==
Statewide, other Mifflin Townships are located in Ashland, Franklin, Pike, and Wyandot counties.

== Government ==
The township is governed by a three-member board of trustees, who are elected in November of odd-numbered years to a four-year term beginning on the following January 1. Two are elected in the year after the presidential election and one is elected in the year before it. There is also an elected township fiscal officer, who serves a four-year term beginning on April 1 of the year after the election, which is held in November of the year before the presidential election. Vacancies in the fiscal officership or on the board of trustees are filled by the remaining trustees.

== Public services ==
Law enforcement in Mifflin Township is the responsibility of the Richland County Sheriff's Office, and fire protection and ambulance services are provided by the Mifflin Township Fire Department
