= Mifflin Township, Wyandot County, Ohio =

Township in Ohio, US

- Township
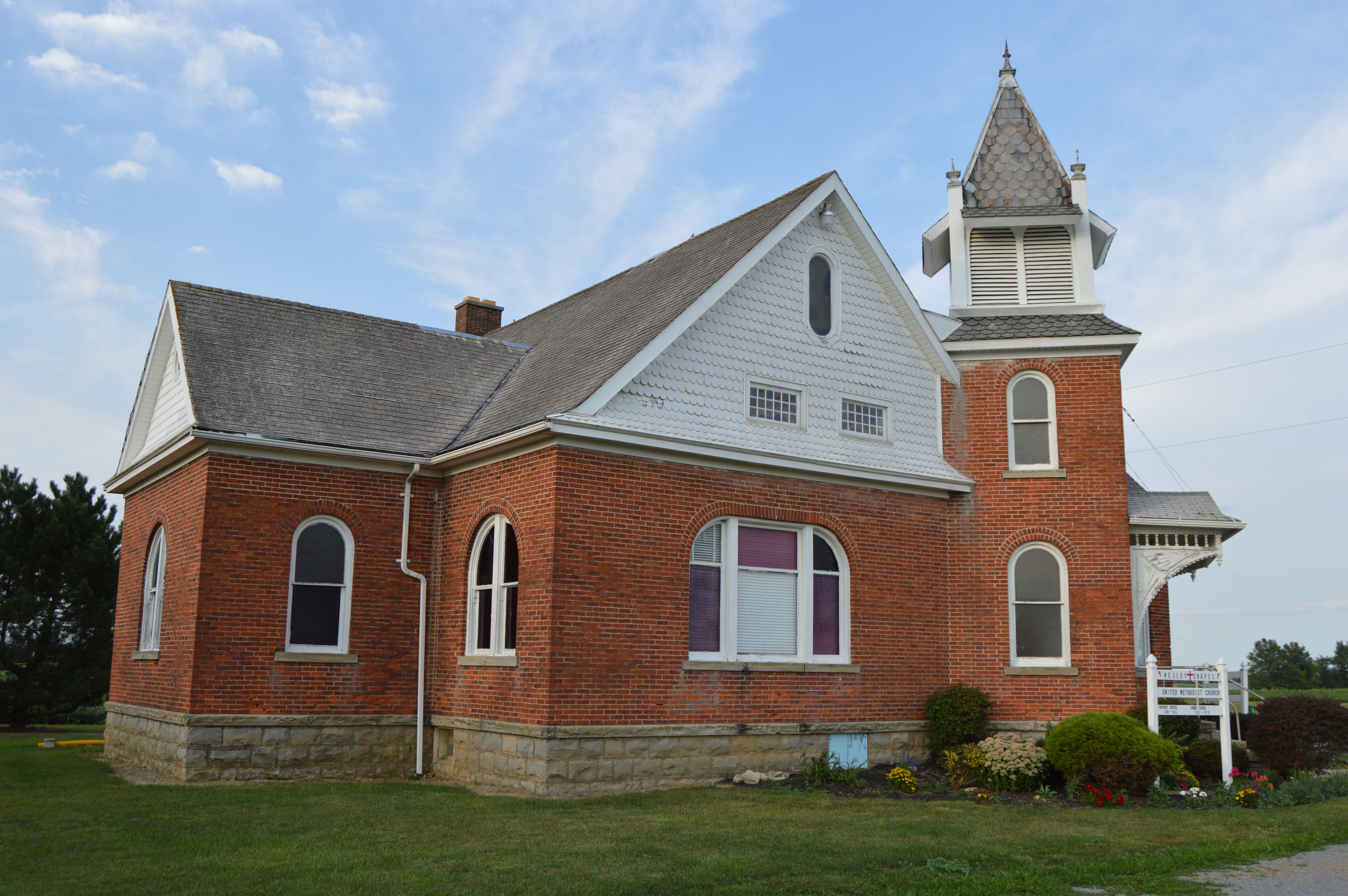
- Wesley Chapel Methodist Church

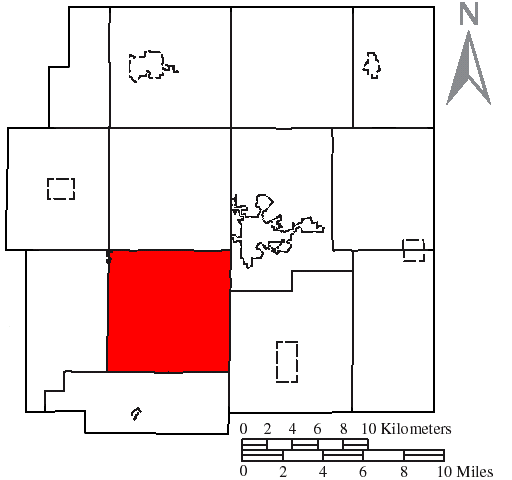
- Location of Mifflin Township in Wyandot County
- Coordinates: 40°47′9″N 83°22′11″W
- Country: United States
- State: Ohio
- County: Wyandot

Area
  - Total: 36.5 sq mi (94.6 km^{2})
  - Land: 36.5 sq mi (94.5 km^{2})
  - Water: 0 sq mi (0.0 km^{2})
- Elevation: 866 ft (264 m)

Population (2020)
  - Total: 741
  - Density: 20.3/sq mi (7.84/km^{2})
- Time zone: UTC-5 (Eastern (EST))
  - Summer (DST): UTC-4 (EDT)
- FIPS code: 39-50106
- GNIS feature ID: 1087208

Mifflin Township is one of the thirteen townships of Wyandot County, north central Ohio, United States. The 2020 census recorded 741 people in the township.

== Geography ==
Located in the southwestern part of the county, it borders the following townships:

- Salem Township – north
- Crane Township – northeast
- Pitt Township – southeast
- Marseilles Township – south
- Jackson Township – west
- Richland Township – northwest corner

Part of the village of Kirby is located in northwestern Mifflin Township.

== Name and history ==
Statewide, other Mifflin townships are located in Ashland, Franklin, Pike, and Richland counties.

== Government ==
The township is governed by a three-member board of trustees, who are elected in November of odd-numbered years to a four-year term beginning on the following January 1. Two are elected in the year after the presidential election and one is elected in the year before it. There is also an elected township fiscal officer, who serves a four-year term beginning on April 1 of the year after the election. This is held in November of the year before the presidential election. Vacancies in the fiscal officership or on the board of trustees are filled by the remaining trustees.
