= Mifflin Township, Ashland County, Ohio =

Township in Ohio, US

- Township
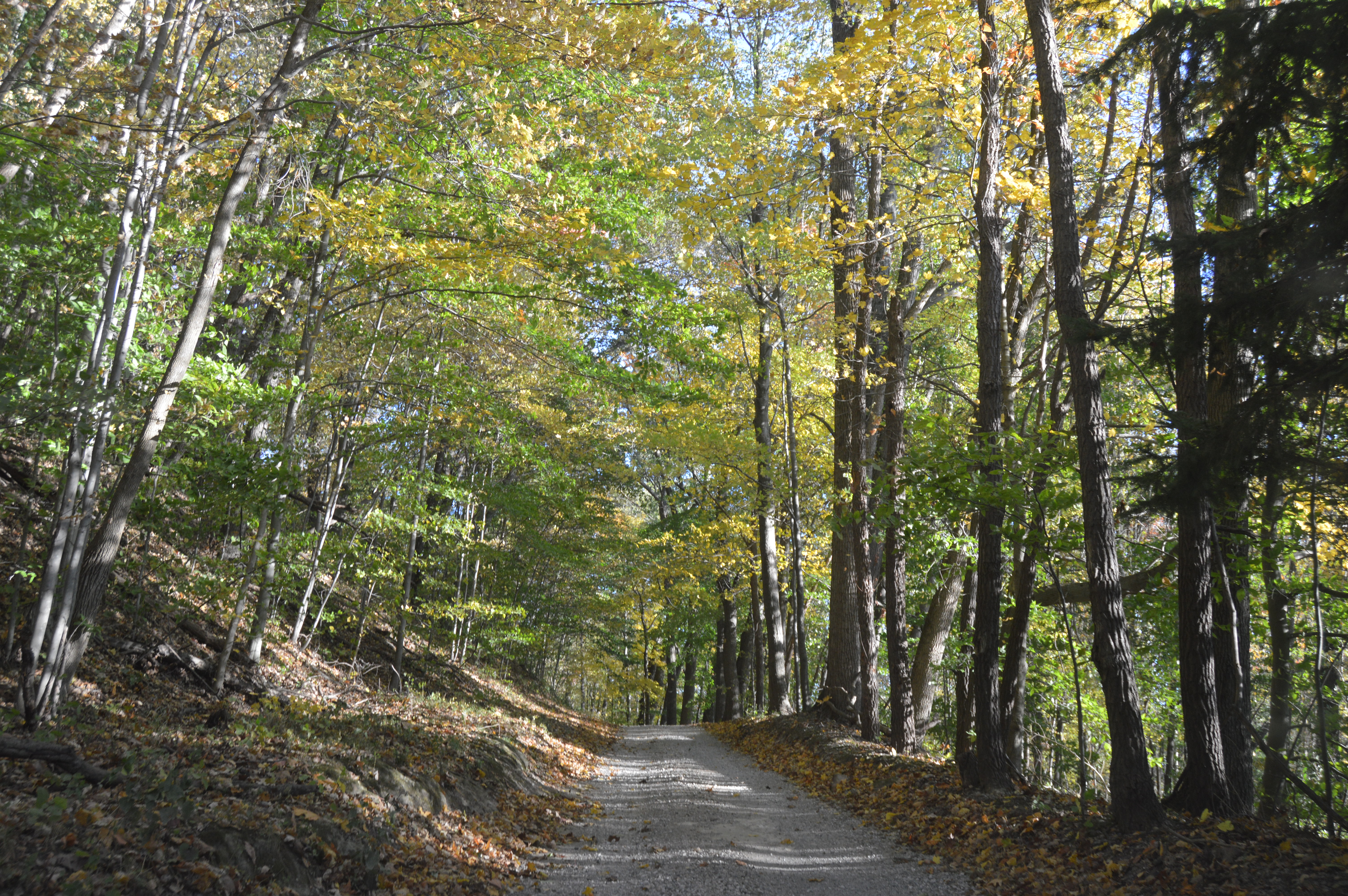
- Wooded road near Charles Mill Lake

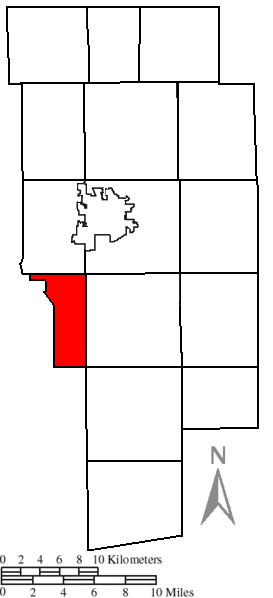
- Location of Mifflin Township in Ashland County
- Coordinates: 40°46′28″N 82°22′0″W
- Country: United States
- State: Ohio
- County: Ashland

Area
  - Total: 13.6 sq mi (35.3 km^{2})
  - Land: 12.4 sq mi (32.0 km^{2})
  - Water: 1.3 sq mi (3.3 km^{2})
- Elevation: 1,309 ft (399 m)

Population (2020)
  - Total: 1,231
  - Density: 91/sq mi (35.2/km^{2})
- Time zone: UTC-5 (Eastern (EST))
  - Summer (DST): UTC-4 (EDT)
- FIPS code: 39-50050
- GNIS feature ID: 1085708
- Website: www.mifflintownship.com

Mifflin Township is one of the fifteen townships of Ashland County, Ohio, United States. The population was 1,231 at the 2020 census.

== Geography ==
Located in the southwestern part of the county, it borders the following townships:

- Milton Township - north
- Montgomery Township - northeast corner
- Vermillion Township - east
- Green Township - southeast corner
- Monroe Township, Richland County - south
- Mifflin Township, Richland County - west
- Weller Township, Richland County - northwest corner

The village of Mifflin is located in central Mifflin Township.

== Name and history ==
Mifflin Township was established about 1814. When Ashland County was formed on 24 February 1846, Mifflin Township was partitioned, with original records remaining in the eastern ~1/3 portion of "old" Mifflin Township in the new Ashland County, and the western ~2/3 portion of "new" Mifflin Township remaining in Richland County.

Statewide, other Mifflin Townships are located in Franklin, Pike, Richland, and Wyandot counties.

== Government ==
The township is governed by a three-member board of trustees, who are elected in November of odd-numbered years to a four-year term beginning on the following January 1. Two are elected in the year after the presidential election and one is elected in the year before it. There is also an elected township fiscal officer, who serves a four-year term beginning on April 1 of the year after the election, which is held in November of the year before the presidential election. Vacancies in the fiscal officership or on the board of trustees are filled by the remaining trustees.
