= Mifflin Township, Franklin County, Ohio =

Township in Ohio, US

- Township
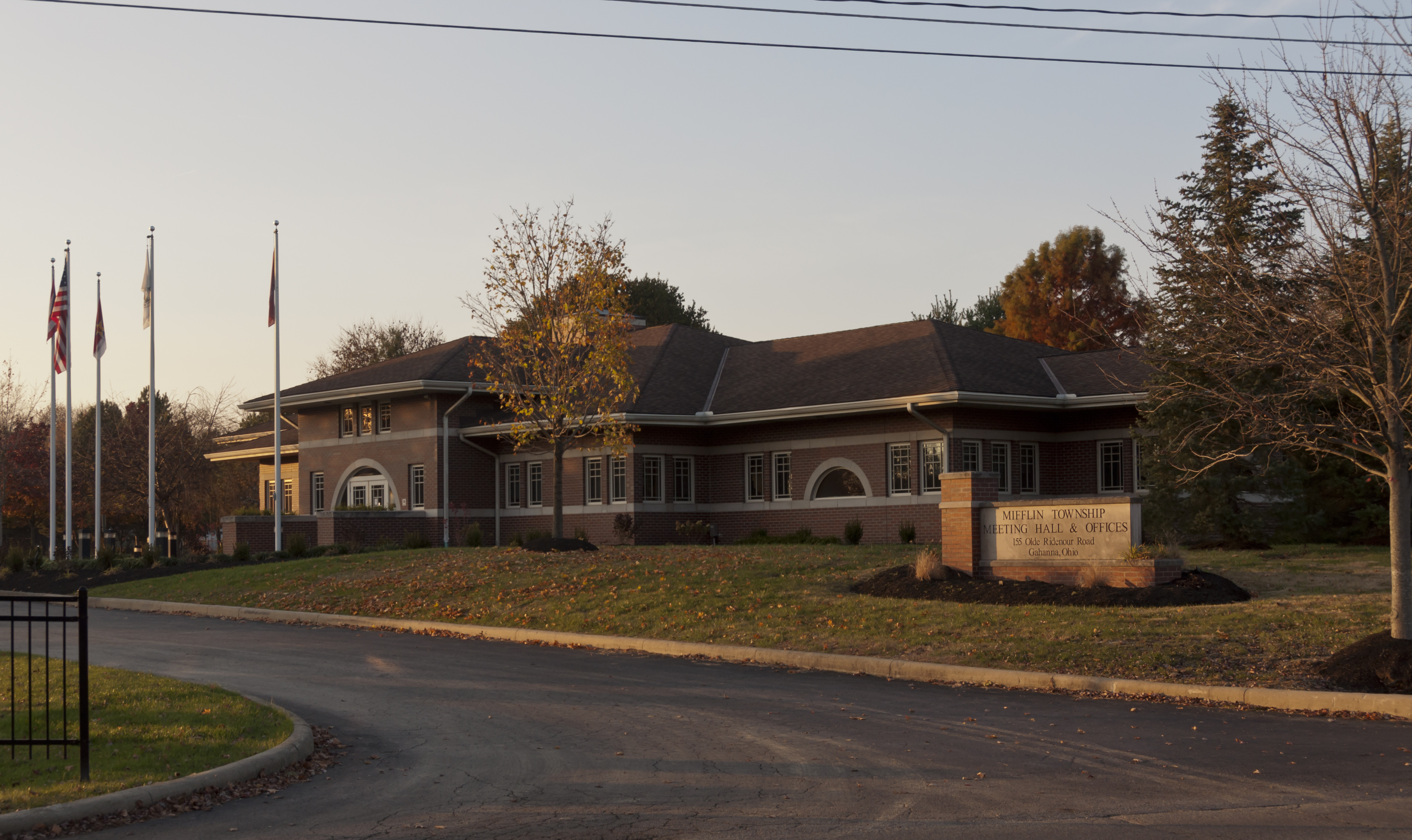
- Mifflin Township Offices

- Location of Mifflin Township in Franklin County.
- Coordinates: 40°1′34″N 82°53′34″W
- Country: United States
- State: Ohio
- County: Franklin

Area
  - Total: 14.6 sq mi (38 km^{2})
  - Land: 14.4 sq mi (37 km^{2})
  - Water: 0.2 sq mi (0.52 km^{2})
- Elevation: 820 ft (250 m)

Population (2020)
  - Total: 38,368
  - Density: 2,660/sq mi (1,030/km^{2})
- Time zone: UTC-5 (Eastern (EST))
  - Summer (DST): UTC-4 (EDT)
- FIPS code: 39-50064
- GNIS feature ID: 1086108

Mifflin Township is one of the seventeen townships of Franklin County, Ohio, United States. The 2020 census found 38,368 people in the township.

== Geography ==
Most of what was once Mifflin Township has since been annexed by the cities of Gahanna in the east and Columbus, the county seat of Franklin County, in the north, west, and south. The several small "islands" that remain are all surrounded by Columbus, except for the largest and most southerly, which borders Gahanna to the east.

== Name and history ==
Statewide, other Mifflin Townships are located in Ashland, Pike, Richland, and Wyandot counties.

The township was officially established in 1811, being separated from Liberty Township. Mifflin Township was named for Mifflin County, Pennsylvania, the former home of one of its early settlers.

== Government ==
The township is governed by a three-member board of trustees, who are elected in November of odd-numbered years to a four-year term beginning on the following January 1. Two are elected in the year after the presidential election and one is elected in the year before it. There is also an elected township fiscal officer, who serves a four-year term beginning on April 1 of the year after the election, which is held in November of the year before the presidential election. Vacancies in the fiscal officership or on the board of trustees are filled by the remaining trustees.
