= List of townships in Ohio =

Ohio townships
- Map of the 1,308 townships in Ohio
- Category: Second-level administrative division
- Location: Ohio
- Created by: Land Ordinance of 1785
- Created: May 20, 1785
- Number: 1,308
- Populations: 97 (Jefferson Township) – 64,830 (West Chester Township)
- Areas: 1.4 square miles (3.6 km^{2}) (Clinton Township) – 184.6 square miles (478 km^{2}) (Madison Township)
- Government: Township government

The list of Ohio townships provides an alphabetic list of the 1362 current and historic townships in Ohio. While some have been totally absorbed into cities or villages, becoming paper townships, the list does not give historic names for any that were renamed.

The 2018-2019 Ohio Municipal, Township and School Board Roster (maintained by the Ohio Secretary of State) lists 1,308 townships, with a 2010 population totaling 5,623,956. When paper townships are excluded, but name variants counted separately (e.g. "Brush Creek" versus "Brushcreek", "Vermilion" versus "Vermillion"), there are 618 different names used by townships statewide, including 451 names used only once. On the opposite end of the spectrum, forty-three townships are named "Washington", and eight other names are used for twenty or more townships each.

Township	County	Defunct
Adams	Champaign	
Adams	Clinton	
Adams	Coshocton	
Adams	Darke	
Adams	Defiance	
Adams	Guernsey	
Adams	Lucas	Defunct
Adams	Monroe	
Adams	Muskingum	
Adams	Seneca	
Adams	Washington	
Addison	Gallia	
Aid	Lawrence	
Alexander	Athens	
Allen	Darke	
Allen	Hancock	
Allen	Ottawa	
Allen	Union	
Amanda	Allen	
Amanda	Fairfield	
Amanda	Hancock	
Amboy	Fulton	
American	Allen	
Ames	Athens	
Amherst	Lorain	
Anderson	Hamilton	
Andover	Ashtabula	
Antrim	Wyandot	
Archer	Harrison	
Ashtabula	Ashtabula	
Athens	Athens	
Athens	Harrison	
Atwater	Portage	
Auburn	Crawford	
Auburn	Geauga	
Auburn	Tuscarawas	
Auglaize	Allen	
Auglaize	Paulding	
Augusta	Carroll	
Aurelius	Washington	
Aurora	Portage	Defunct
Austinburg	Ashtabula	
Austintown	Mahoning	
Avon	Lorain	Defunct
Bainbridge	Geauga	
Ballville	Sandusky	
Barlow	Washington	
Bartlow	Henry	
Batavia	Clermont	
Bath	Allen	
Bath	Greene	
Bath	Summit	
Baughman	Wayne	
Bay	Ottawa	
Bazetta	Trumbull	
Bearfield	Perry	
Beaver	Mahoning	
Beaver	Noble	
Beaver	Pike	
Beavercreek	Greene	
Bedford	Coshocton	
Bedford	Cuyahoga	Defunct
Bedford	Meigs	
Belpre	Washington	
Bennington	Licking	
Bennington	Morrow	
Benton	Hocking	
Benton	Monroe	
Benton	Ottawa	
Benton	Paulding	
Benton	Pike	
Berkshire	Delaware	
Berlin	Delaware	
Berlin	Erie	
Berlin	Holmes	
Berlin	Knox	
Berlin	Mahoning	
Bern	Athens	
Berne	Fairfield	
Bethel	Clark	
Bethel	Miami	
Bethel	Monroe	
Bethlehem	Coshocton	
Bethlehem	Stark	
Big Island	Marion	
Big Spring	Seneca	
Biglick	Hancock	
Black Creek	Mercer	
Black River	Lorain	Defunct
Blanchard	Hancock	
Blanchard	Hardin	
Blanchard	Putnam	
Blendon	Franklin	
Bloom	Fairfield	
Bloom	Morgan	
Bloom	Scioto	
Bloom	Seneca	
Bloom	Wood	
Bloomfield	Jackson	
Bloomfield	Logan	
Bloomfield	Trumbull	
Blooming Grove	Richland	
Blue Creek	Paulding	
Blue Rock	Muskingum	
Boardman	Mahoning	
Bokes Creek	Logan	
Boston	Summit	
Bowling Green	Licking	
Bowling Green	Marion	
Braceville	Trumbull	
Brady	Williams	
Bratton	Adams	
Brecksville	Cuyahoga	Defunct
Bridgewater	Williams	
Brighton	Lorain	
Brimfield	Portage	
Bristol	Morgan	
Bristol	Trumbull	
Bronson	Huron	
Brookfield	Noble	
Brookfield	Trumbull	
Brooklyn	Cuyahoga	Defunct
Brown	Carroll	
Brown	Darke	
Brown	Delaware	
Brown	Franklin	
Brown	Knox	
Brown	Miami	
Brown	Paulding	
Brown	Vinton	
Brownhelm	Lorain	
Brunswick Hills	Medina	
Brush Creek	Adams	
Brush Creek	Jefferson	
Brush Creek	Muskingum	
Brush Creek	Scioto	
Brushcreek	Highland	
Buck	Hardin	
Bucks	Tuscarawas	
Buckskin	Ross	
Bucyrus	Crawford	
Buffalo	Noble	
Burlington	Licking	
Burton	Geauga	
Butler	Columbiana	
Butler	Darke	
Butler	Knox	
Butler	Mercer	
Butler	Montgomery	
Butler	Richland	
Byrd	Brown	
Cadiz	Harrison	
Caesarscreek	Greene	
Cambridge	Guernsey	
Camden	Lorain	
Camp Creek	Pike	
Canaan	Athens	
Canaan	Madison	
Canaan	Morrow	
Canaan	Wayne	
Canfield	Mahoning	
Canton	Stark	
Cardington	Morrow	
Carlisle	Lorain	
Carroll	Ottawa	
Carryall	Paulding	
Carthage	Athens	
Cass	Hancock	
Cass	Muskingum	
Cass	Richland	
Catawba Island	Ottawa	
Cedarville	Greene	
Center	Carroll	
Center	Columbiana	
Center	Guernsey	
Center	Mercer	
Center	Monroe	
Center	Morgan	
Center	Noble	
Center	Williams	
Center	Wood	
Cessna	Hardin	
Chagrin Falls	Cuyahoga	
Champion	Trumbull	
Chardon	Geauga	
Charlestown	Portage	
Chatfield	Crawford	
Chatham	Medina	
Cherry Valley	Ashtabula	
Cheshire	Gallia	
Chester	Clinton	
Chester	Geauga	
Chester	Meigs	
Chester	Morrow	
Chester	Wayne	
Chesterfield	Fulton	
Chippewa	Wayne	
Circleville	Pickaway	
Claibourne	Union	
Claridon	Geauga	
Claridon	Marion	
Clark	Brown	
Clark	Clinton	
Clark	Coshocton	
Clark	Holmes	
Clarksfield	Huron	
Clay	Auglaize	
Clay	Gallia	
Clay	Highland	
Clay	Knox	
Clay	Montgomery	
Clay	Muskingum	
Clay	Ottawa	
Clay	Scioto	
Clay	Tuscarawas	
Clayton	Perry	
Clear Creek	Ashland	
Clearcreek	Fairfield	
Clearcreek	Warren	
Clinton	Franklin	
Clinton	Fulton	
Clinton	Knox	
Clinton	Seneca	
Clinton	Shelby	
Clinton	Vinton	
Clinton	Wayne	
Coal	Jackson	
Coal	Perry	
Coitsville	Mahoning	
Colebrook	Ashtabula	
Colerain	Belmont	
Colerain	Hamilton	
Colerain	Ross	
College	Knox	
Columbia	Hamilton	
Columbia	Lorain	
Columbia	Meigs	
Concord	Champaign	
Concord	Delaware	
Concord	Fayette	
Concord	Highland	
Concord	Lake	
Concord	Miami	
Concord	Ross	
Congress	Morrow	
Congress	Wayne	
Conneaut	Ashtabula	Defunct
Copley	Summit	
Coventry	Summit	
Cranberry	Crawford	
Crane	Paulding	
Crane	Wyandot	
Crawford	Coshocton	
Crawford	Wyandot	
Crosby	Hamilton	
Cross Creek	Jefferson	
Cynthian	Shelby	
Dallas	Crawford	
Damascus	Henry	
Danbury	Ottawa	
Darby	Madison	
Darby	Pickaway	
Darby	Union	
Decatur	Lawrence	
Decatur	Washington	
Deer Creek	Madison	
Deer Creek	Pickaway	
Deerfield	Morgan	
Deerfield	Portage	
Deerfield	Ross	
Deerfield	Warren	
Defiance	Defiance	
Delaware	Defiance	
Delaware	Delaware	
Delaware	Hancock	
Delhi	Hamilton	
Denmark	Ashtabula	
Dinsmore	Shelby	
Dixon	Preble	
Dodson	Highland	
Dorset	Ashtabula	
Dover	Athens	
Dover	Cuyahoga	Defunct
Dover	Fulton	
Dover	Tuscarawas	
Dover	Union	
Dublin	Mercer	
Duchouquet	Auglaize	
Dudley	Hardin	
Dunham	Washington	
Eagle	Brown	
Eagle	Hancock	
Eagle	Vinton	
East Cleveland	Cuyahoga	Defunct
East	Carroll	
East Union	Wayne	
Eaton	Lorain	
Eaton	Warren	Defunct
Eden	Licking	
Eden	Seneca	
Eden	Wyandot	
Edinburg	Portage	
Elizabeth	Lawrence	
Elizabeth	Miami	
Elk	Noble	
Elk	Vinton	
Elkrun	Columbiana	
Ellsworth	Mahoning	
Elyria	Lorain	
Emerald	Paulding	
Enoch	Noble	
Erie	Ottawa	
Etna	Licking	
Euclid	Cuyahoga	Defunct
Fairfield	Butler	
Fairfield	Columbiana	
Fairfield	Highland	
Fairfield	Huron	
Fairfield	Madison	
Fairfield	Tuscarawas	
Fairfield	Washington	
Falls	Hocking	
Falls	Muskingum	
Fallsbury	Licking	
Farmer	Defiance	
Farmington	Trumbull	
Fayette	Lawrence	
Fearing	Washington	
Fitchville	Huron	
Flatrock	Henry	
Florence	Erie	
Florence	Williams	
Flushing	Belmont	
Fowler	Trumbull	
Fox	Carroll	
Franklin	Adams	
Franklin	Brown	
Franklin	Clermont	
Franklin	Columbiana	
Franklin	Coshocton	
Franklin	Darke	
Franklin	Franklin	
Franklin	Fulton	
Franklin	Harrison	
Franklin	Jackson	
Franklin	Licking	
Franklin	Mercer	
Franklin	Monroe	
Franklin	Morrow	
Franklin	Portage	
Franklin	Richland	
Franklin	Ross	
Franklin	Shelby	
Franklin	Summit	Defunct
Franklin	Tuscarawas	
Franklin	Warren	
Franklin	Wayne	
Freedom	Henry	
Freedom	Portage	
Freedom	Wood	
Freeport	Harrison	
Fulton	Fulton	
Gallipolis	Gallia	
Gasper	Preble	
Geneva	Ashtabula	
Genoa	Delaware	
German	Auglaize	
German	Clark	
German	Fulton	
German	Harrison	
German	Montgomery	
Gibson	Mercer	
Gilead	Morrow	
Good Hope	Hocking	
Gorham	Fulton	
Goshen	Auglaize	
Goshen	Belmont	
Goshen	Champaign	
Goshen	Clermont	
Goshen	Hardin	
Goshen	Mahoning	
Goshen	Tuscarawas	
Grafton	Lorain	
Grand Prairie	Marion	
Grand Rapids	Wood	
Grand	Marion	
Grandview	Washington	
Granger	Medina	
Granville	Licking	
Granville	Mercer	
Gratis	Preble	
Green Camp	Marion	
Green Creek	Sandusky	
Green	Adams	
Green	Ashland	
Green	Brown	
Green	Clark	
Green	Clinton	
Green	Fayette	
Green	Gallia	
Green	Hamilton	
Green	Harrison	
Green	Hocking	
Green	Mahoning	
Green	Monroe	
Green	Ross	
Green	Scioto	
Green	Shelby	
Green	Summit	Defunct
Green	Wayne	
Greene	Trumbull	
Greenfield	Fairfield	
Greenfield	Gallia	
Greenfield	Huron	
Greensburg	Putnam	
Greenville	Darke	
Greenwich	Huron	
Groton	Erie	
Guilford	Medina	
Gustavus	Trumbull	
Guyan	Gallia	
Hale	Hardin	
Hambden	Geauga	
Hamer	Highland	
Hamilton	Franklin	
Hamilton	Jackson	
Hamilton	Lawrence	
Hamilton	Warren	
Hanover	Ashland	
Hanover	Butler	
Hanover	Columbiana	
Hanover	Licking	
Harding	Lucas	
Hardy	Holmes	
Harlan	Warren	
Harlem	Delaware	
Harmony	Clark	
Harmony	Morrow	
Harpersfield	Ashtabula	
Harris	Ottawa	
Harrison	Carroll	
Harrison	Champaign	
Harrison	Darke	
Harrison	Gallia	
Harrison	Hamilton	
Harrison	Henry	
Harrison	Knox	
Harrison	Licking	
Harrison	Logan	
Harrison	Montgomery	
Harrison	Muskingum	
Harrison	Paulding	
Harrison	Perry	
Harrison	Pickaway	
Harrison	Preble	
Harrison	Ross	
Harrison	Scioto	
Harrison	Van Wert	
Harrison	Vinton	
Harrisville	Medina	
Hartford	Licking	
Hartford	Trumbull	
Hartland	Huron	
Hartsgrove	Ashtabula	
Henrietta	Lorain	
Henry	Wood	
Hicksville	Defiance	
Highland	Defiance	
Highland	Muskingum	
Hilliar	Knox	
Hinckley	Medina	
Hiram	Portage	
Hoaglin	Van Wert	
Hocking	Fairfield	
Holmes	Crawford	
Homer	Medina	
Homer	Morgan	
Hopewell	Licking	
Hopewell	Mercer	
Hopewell	Muskingum	
Hopewell	Perry	
Hopewell	Seneca	
Howard	Knox	
Howland	Trumbull	
Hubbard	Trumbull	
Hudson	Summit	Defunct
Huntington	Brown	
Huntington	Gallia	
Huntington	Lorain	
Huntington	Ross	
Huntsburg	Geauga	
Huron	Erie	
Independence	Cuyahoga	Defunct
Independence	Washington	
Island Creek	Jefferson	
Israel	Preble	
Jackson	Allen	
Jackson	Ashland	
Jackson	Auglaize	
Jackson	Brown	
Jackson	Champaign	
Jackson	Clermont	
Jackson	Coshocton	
Jackson	Crawford	
Jackson	Darke	
Jackson	Franklin	
Jackson	Guernsey	
Jackson	Hancock	
Jackson	Hardin	
Jackson	Highland	
Jackson	Jackson	
Jackson	Knox	
Jackson	Mahoning	
Jackson	Monroe	
Jackson	Montgomery	
Jackson	Muskingum	
Jackson	Noble	
Jackson	Paulding	
Jackson	Perry	
Jackson	Pickaway	
Jackson	Pike	
Jackson	Preble	
Jackson	Putnam	
Jackson	Richland	
Jackson	Sandusky	
Jackson	Seneca	
Jackson	Shelby	
Jackson	Stark	
Jackson	Union	
Jackson	Van Wert	
Jackson	Vinton	
Jackson	Wood	
Jackson	Wyandot	
Jasper	Fayette	
Jefferson	Adams	
Jefferson	Ashtabula	
Jefferson	Brown	
Jefferson	Clinton	
Jefferson	Coshocton	
Jefferson	Crawford	
Jefferson	Fayette	
Jefferson	Franklin	
Jefferson	Greene	
Jefferson	Guernsey	
Jefferson	Jackson	
Jefferson	Knox	
Jefferson	Logan	
Jefferson	Madison	
Jefferson	Mercer	
Jefferson	Montgomery	
Jefferson	Muskingum	
Jefferson	Noble	
Jefferson	Preble	
Jefferson	Richland	
Jefferson	Ross	
Jefferson	Scioto	
Jefferson	Tuscarawas	
Jefferson	Williams	
Jennings	Putnam	
Jennings	Van Wert	
Jerome	Union	
Jersey	Licking	
Jerusalem	Lucas	
Johnson	Champaign	
Johnston	Trumbull	
Keene	Coshocton	
Kelleys Island	Erie	Defunct
Killbuck	Holmes	
Kingston	Delaware	
Kingsville	Ashtabula	
Kinsman	Trumbull	
Kirkwood	Belmont	
Kirtland	Lake	Defunct
Knox	Columbiana	
Knox	Guernsey	
Knox	Holmes	
Knox	Jefferson	
Knox	Vinton	
Lafayette	Coshocton	
Lafayette	Medina	
LaGrange	Lorain	
Lake	Ashland	
Lake	Logan	
Lake	Stark	
Lake	Wood	
Lanier	Preble	
Latty	Paulding	
Laurel	Hocking	
Lawrence	Lawrence	
Lawrence	Stark	
Lawrence	Tuscarawas	
Lawrence	Washington	
Lebanon	Meigs	
Lee	Athens	
Lee	Carroll	
Lee	Monroe	
Leesburg	Union	
Lemon	Butler	
Lenox	Ashtabula	
LeRoy	Lake	
Letart	Meigs	
Lewis	Brown	
Lexington	Stark	
Liberty	Adams	
Liberty	Butler	
Liberty	Clinton	
Liberty	Crawford	
Liberty	Darke	
Liberty	Delaware	
Liberty	Fairfield	
Liberty	Guernsey	
Liberty	Hancock	
Liberty	Hardin	
Liberty	Henry	
Liberty	Highland	
Liberty	Jackson	
Liberty	Knox	
Liberty	Licking	
Liberty	Logan	
Liberty	Mercer	
Liberty	Putnam	
Liberty	Ross	
Liberty	Seneca	
Liberty	Trumbull	
Liberty	Union	
Liberty	Van Wert	
Liberty	Washington	
Liberty	Wood	
Lick	Jackson	
Licking	Licking	
Licking	Muskingum	
Lima	Licking	Defunct
Lincoln	Morrow	
Linton	Coshocton	
Litchfield	Medina	
Liverpool	Columbiana	
Liverpool	Medina	
Lodi	Athens	
Logan	Auglaize	
Londonderry	Guernsey	
Loramie	Shelby	
Lordstown	Trumbull	Defunct
Lostcreek	Miami	
Loudon	Carroll	
Loudon	Seneca	
Ludlow	Washington	
Lykens	Crawford	
Lyme	Huron	
Lynn	Hardin	
Macedonia	Summit	Defunct
Mad River	Champaign	
Mad River	Clark	
Mad River	Montgomery	Defunct
Madison	Butler	
Madison	Clark	
Madison	Columbiana	
Madison	Fairfield	
Madison	Fayette	
Madison	Franklin	
Madison	Guernsey	
Madison	Hancock	
Madison	Highland	
Madison	Jackson	
Madison	Lake	
Madison	Licking	
Madison	Montgomery	Defunct
Madison	Muskingum	
Madison	Perry	
Madison	Pickaway	
Madison	Richland	
Madison	Sandusky	
Madison	Scioto	
Madison	Vinton	
Madison	Williams	
Malaga	Monroe	
Malta	Morgan	
Manchester	Adams	
Manchester	Morgan	
Mantua	Portage	
Margaretta	Erie	
Marietta	Washington	
Marion	Allen	
Marion	Clinton	
Marion	Fayette	
Marion	Franklin	Defunct
Marion	Hancock	
Marion	Hardin	
Marion	Henry	
Marion	Hocking	
Marion	Marion	
Marion	Mercer	
Marion	Morgan	
Marion	Noble	
Marion	Pike	
Mark	Defiance	
Marlboro	Delaware	
Marlboro	Stark	
Marseilles	Wyandot	
Marshall	Highland	
Mary Ann	Licking	
Mason	Lawrence	
Massie	Warren	
Mayfield	Cuyahoga	Defunct
McArthur	Logan	
McDonald	Hardin	
McKean	Licking	
McLean	Shelby	
Mead	Belmont	
Mecca	Trumbull	
Mechanic	Holmes	
Medina	Medina	
Meigs	Adams	
Meigs	Muskingum	
Meigsville	Morgan	
Mentor	Lake	Defunct
Mesopotamia	Trumbull	
Miami	Clermont	
Miami	Greene	
Miami	Hamilton	
Miami	Logan	
Miami	Montgomery	
Middleburg	Cuyahoga	Defunct
Middlebury	Knox	
Middlefield	Geauga	
Middleton	Columbiana	
Middleton	Wood	
Mifflin	Ashland	
Mifflin	Franklin	
Mifflin	Pike	
Mifflin	Richland	
Mifflin	Wyandot	
Milan	Erie	
Milford	Butler	
Milford	Defiance	
Milford	Knox	
Mill Creek	Coshocton	
Mill Creek	Hamilton	Defunct
Mill Creek	Williams	
Mill	Tuscarawas	
Millcreek	Union	
Miller	Knox	
Millwood	Guernsey	
Milton	Ashland	
Milton	Jackson	
Milton	Mahoning	
Milton	Wayne	
Milton	Wood	
Mississinawa	Darke	
Mohican	Ashland	
Monclova	Lucas	
Monday Creek	Perry	
Monroe	Adams	
Monroe	Allen	
Monroe	Ashtabula	
Monroe	Carroll	
Monroe	Clermont	
Monroe	Coshocton	
Monroe	Darke	
Monroe	Guernsey	
Monroe	Harrison	
Monroe	Henry	
Monroe	Holmes	
Monroe	Knox	
Monroe	Licking	
Monroe	Logan	
Monroe	Madison	
Monroe	Miami	
Monroe	Muskingum	
Monroe	Perry	
Monroe	Pickaway	
Monroe	Preble	
Monroe	Putnam	
Monroe	Richland	
Monterey	Putnam	
Montgomery	Ashland	
Montgomery	Marion	
Montgomery	Wood	
Montville	Geauga	
Montville	Medina	
Moorefield	Clark	
Moorefield	Harrison	
Morgan	Ashtabula	
Morgan	Butler	
Morgan	Gallia	
Morgan	Knox	
Morgan	Morgan	
Morgan	Scioto	
Morris	Knox	
Moulton	Auglaize	
Mount Pleasant	Jefferson	
Muhlenberg	Pickaway	
Munson	Geauga	
Muskingum	Muskingum	
Muskingum	Washington	
Napoleon	Henry	
Neave	Darke	
Nelson	Portage	
New Haven	Huron	
New Jasper	Greene	
New London	Huron	
New Lyme	Ashtabula	
New Market	Highland	
New Russia	Lorain	
Newark	Licking	
Newberry	Miami	
Newburgh	Cuyahoga	Defunct
Newbury	Geauga	
Newcastle	Coshocton	
Newport	Washington	
Newton	Licking	
Newton	Miami	
Newton	Muskingum	
Newton	Pike	
Newton	Trumbull	
Nile	Scioto	
Nimishillen	Stark	
Noble	Auglaize	
Noble	Defiance	
Noble	Noble	
North Bloomfield	Morrow	
North	Harrison	
Northampton	Summit	Defunct
Northfield Center	Summit	
Northwest	Williams	
Norton	Summit	Defunct
Norwalk	Huron	
Norwich	Franklin	
Norwich	Huron	
Nottingham	Harrison	
Oak Run	Madison	
Ohio	Clermont	
Ohio	Gallia	
Ohio	Monroe	
Olive	Meigs	
Olive	Noble	
Oliver	Adams	
Olmsted	Cuyahoga	
Orange	Ashland	
Orange	Carroll	
Orange	Cuyahoga	Defunct
Orange	Delaware	
Orange	Hancock	
Orange	Meigs	
Orange	Shelby	
Oregon	Lucas	Defunct
Orwell	Ashtabula	
Osnaburg	Stark	
Ottawa	Allen	Defunct
Ottawa	Putnam	
Oxford	Butler	
Oxford	Coshocton	
Oxford	Delaware	
Oxford	Erie	
Oxford	Guernsey	
Oxford	Tuscarawas	
Painesville	Lake	
Paint	Fayette	
Paint	Highland	
Paint	Holmes	
Paint	Madison	
Paint	Ross	
Paint	Wayne	
Palmer	Putnam	
Palmer	Washington	
Palmyra	Portage	
Paris	Portage	
Paris	Stark	
Paris	Union	
Parkman	Geauga	
Parma	Cuyahoga	Defunct
Patterson	Darke	
Paulding	Paulding	
Paxton	Ross	
Pease	Belmont	
Pebble	Pike	
Pee Pee	Pike	
Penfield	Lorain	
Penn	Highland	
Penn	Morgan	
Perkins	Erie	
Perry	Allen	
Perry	Ashland	
Perry	Brown	
Perry	Carroll	
Perry	Columbiana	
Perry	Coshocton	
Perry	Fayette	
Perry	Franklin	
Perry	Gallia	
Perry	Hocking	
Perry	Lake	
Perry	Lawrence	
Perry	Licking	
Perry	Logan	
Perry	Monroe	
Perry	Montgomery	
Perry	Morrow	
Perry	Muskingum	
Perry	Pickaway	
Perry	Pike	
Perry	Putnam	
Perry	Richland	
Perry	Shelby	
Perry	Stark	
Perry	Tuscarawas	
Perry	Wood	
Perrysburg	Wood	
Peru	Huron	
Peru	Morrow	
Pickaway	Pickaway	
Pierce	Clermont	
Pierpont	Ashtabula	
Pike	Brown	
Pike	Clark	
Pike	Coshocton	
Pike	Fulton	
Pike	Knox	
Pike	Madison	
Pike	Perry	
Pike	Stark	
Pitt	Wyandot	
Pittsfield	Lorain	
Plain	Franklin	
Plain	Stark	
Plain	Wayne	
Plain	Wood	
Pleasant	Brown	
Pleasant	Clark	
Pleasant	Fairfield	
Pleasant	Franklin	
Pleasant	Hancock	
Pleasant	Hardin	
Pleasant	Henry	
Pleasant	Knox	
Pleasant	Logan	
Pleasant	Madison	
Pleasant	Marion	
Pleasant	Perry	
Pleasant	Putnam	
Pleasant	Seneca	
Pleasant	Van Wert	
Plymouth	Ashtabula	
Plymouth	Richland	
Poland	Mahoning	
Polk	Crawford	
Portage	Hancock	
Portage	Ottawa	
Portage	Summit	Defunct
Portage	Wood	
Porter	Delaware	
Porter	Scioto	
Prairie	Franklin	
Prairie	Holmes	
Prospect	Marion	
Providence	Lucas	
Pulaski	Williams	
Pultney	Belmont	
Pusheta	Auglaize	
Put-in-Bay	Ottawa	
Raccoon	Gallia	
Radnor	Delaware	
Randolph	Montgomery	Defunct
Randolph	Portage	
Range	Madison	
Rarden	Scioto	
Ravenna	Portage	
Reading	Perry	
Recovery	Mercer	
Reed	Seneca	
Reily	Butler	
Rice	Sandusky	
Rich Hill	Muskingum	
Richfield	Henry	
Richfield	Lucas	
Richfield	Summit	
Richland	Allen	
Richland	Belmont	
Richland	Clinton	
Richland	Darke	
Richland	Defiance	
Richland	Fairfield	
Richland	Guernsey	
Richland	Holmes	
Richland	Logan	
Richland	Marion	
Richland	Vinton	
Richland	Wyandot	
Richmond	Ashtabula	
Richmond	Huron	
Ridge	Van Wert	
Ridge	Wyandot	
Ridgefield	Huron	
Ridgeville	Henry	
Ridgeville	Lorain	Defunct
Riley	Putnam	
Riley	Sandusky	
Ripley	Holmes	
Ripley	Huron	
Riveredge	Cuyahoga	Defunct
Rochester	Lorain	
Rockport	Cuyahoga	Defunct
Rome	Ashtabula	
Rome	Athens	
Rome	Lawrence	
Rootstown	Portage	
Rose	Carroll	
Ross	Butler	
Ross	Greene	
Ross	Jefferson	
Ross	Wood	Defunct
Roundhead	Hardin	
Royalton	Cuyahoga	Defunct
Royalton	Fulton	
Ruggles	Ashland	
Rumley	Harrison	
Rush Creek	Fairfield	
Rush	Champaign	
Rush	Scioto	
Rush	Tuscarawas	
Rushcreek	Logan	
Russell	Geauga	
Rutland	Meigs	
Sagamore Hills	Summit	
Saint Marys	Auglaize	
Salem	Auglaize	
Salem	Champaign	
Salem	Columbiana	
Salem	Highland	
Salem	Jefferson	
Salem	Meigs	
Salem	Monroe	
Salem	Muskingum	
Salem	Ottawa	
Salem	Shelby	
Salem	Tuscarawas	
Salem	Warren	
Salem	Washington	
Salem	Wyandot	
Saline	Jefferson	
Salisbury	Meigs	
Salt Creek	Hocking	
Salt Creek	Holmes	
Salt Creek	Muskingum	
Salt Creek	Pickaway	
Salt Creek	Wayne	
Salt Lick	Perry	
Salt Rock	Marion	
Sandusky	Crawford	
Sandusky	Richland	
Sandusky	Sandusky	
Sandy	Stark	
Sandy	Tuscarawas	
Saybrook	Ashtabula	
Scioto	Delaware	
Scioto	Jackson	
Scioto	Pickaway	
Scioto	Pike	
Scioto	Ross	
Scipio	Meigs	
Scipio	Seneca	
Scott	Adams	
Scott	Brown	
Scott	Marion	
Scott	Sandusky	
Seal	Pike	
Seneca	Monroe	
Seneca	Noble	
Seneca	Seneca	
Shalersville	Portage	
Sharon	Franklin	
Sharon	Medina	
Sharon	Noble	
Sharon	Richland	
Shawnee	Allen	
Sheffield	Ashtabula	
Sheffield	Lorain	
Sherman	Huron	
Short Creek	Harrison	
Silvercreek	Greene	
Smith	Belmont	
Smith	Mahoning	
Smithfield	Jefferson	
Solon	Cuyahoga	Defunct
Somerford	Madison	
Somers	Preble	
Somerset	Belmont	
South Bloomfield	Morrow	
Southington	Trumbull	
Spencer	Allen	
Spencer	Guernsey	
Spencer	Lucas	
Spencer	Medina	
Sprigg	Adams	
Spring Valley	Greene	
Springcreek	Miami	
Springfield	Clark	
Springfield	Gallia	
Springfield	Hamilton	
Springfield	Jefferson	
Springfield	Lucas	
Springfield	Mahoning	
Springfield	Muskingum	
Springfield	Richland	
Springfield	Ross	
Springfield	Summit	
Springfield	Williams	
St. Albans	Licking	
St. Clair	Butler	
St. Clair	Columbiana	
St. Joseph	Williams	
Starr	Hocking	
Staunton	Miami	
Sterling	Brown	
Steubenville	Jefferson	
Stock	Harrison	
Stock	Noble	
Stokes	Logan	
Stokes	Madison	
Stonelick	Clermont	
Stow	Summit	Defunct
Streetsboro	Portage	Defunct
Strongsville	Cuyahoga	Defunct
Suffield	Portage	
Sugar Creek	Allen	
Sugar Creek	Putnam	
Sugar Creek	Stark	
Sugar Creek	Tuscarawas	
Sugar Creek	Wayne	
Sugarcreek	Greene	
Sullivan	Ashland	
Summit	Monroe	
Sunfish	Pike	
Sunsbury	Monroe	
Superior	Williams	
Sutton	Meigs	
Swan Creek	Fulton	
Swan	Vinton	
Swanton	Lucas	
Switzerland	Monroe	
Sycamore	Hamilton	
Sycamore	Wyandot	
Sylvania	Lucas	
Symmes	Hamilton	
Symmes	Lawrence	
Tallmadge	Summit	Defunct
Tate	Clermont	
Taylor Creek	Hardin	
Taylor	Union	
Texas	Crawford	
Thompson	Delaware	
Thompson	Geauga	
Thompson	Seneca	
Thorn	Perry	
Tiffin	Adams	
Tiffin	Defiance	
Tiverton	Coshocton	
Tod	Crawford	
Townsend	Huron	
Townsend	Sandusky	
Trenton	Delaware	
Trimble	Athens	
Troy	Ashland	
Troy	Athens	
Troy	Delaware	
Troy	Geauga	
Troy	Morrow	
Troy	Richland	
Troy	Wood	
Trumbull	Ashtabula	
Truro	Franklin	
Tully	Marion	
Tully	Van Wert	
Turtle Creek	Shelby	
Turtlecreek	Warren	
Tuscarawas	Coshocton	
Tuscarawas	Stark	
Twin	Darke	
Twin	Preble	
Twin	Ross	
Twinsburg	Summit	
Tymochtee	Wyandot	
Union	Auglaize	
Union	Belmont	
Union	Brown	
Union	Carroll	
Union	Champaign	
Union	Clermont	
Union	Clinton	
Union	Fayette	
Union	Hancock	
Union	Highland	
Union	Knox	
Union	Lawrence	
Union	Licking	
Union	Logan	
Union	Madison	
Union	Mercer	
Union	Miami	
Union	Morgan	
Union	Muskingum	
Union	Pike	
Union	Putnam	
Union	Ross	
Union	Scioto	
Union	Tuscarawas	
Union	Union	
Union	Van Wert	
Union	Warren	
Unity	Columbiana	
Upper	Lawrence	
Urbana	Champaign	
Valley	Guernsey	
Valley	Scioto	
Van Buren	Darke	
Van Buren	Hancock	
Van Buren	Montgomery	Defunct
Van Buren	Putnam	
Van Buren	Shelby	
Venice	Seneca	
Vermilion	Erie	
Vermillion	Ashland	
Vernon	Clinton	
Vernon	Crawford	
Vernon	Scioto	
Vernon	Trumbull	
Vienna	Trumbull	
Vinton	Vinton	
Violet	Fairfield	
Virginia	Coshocton	
Wabash	Darke	
Wadsworth	Medina	
Wakeman	Huron	
Waldo	Marion	
Walnut Creek	Holmes	
Walnut	Fairfield	
Walnut	Gallia	
Walnut	Pickaway	
Ward	Hocking	
Warren	Belmont	
Warren	Jefferson	
Warren	Trumbull	
Warren	Tuscarawas	
Warren	Washington	
Warrensville	Cuyahoga	Defunct
Warwick	Tuscarawas	
Washington	Auglaize	
Washington	Belmont	
Washington	Brown	
Washington	Carroll	
Washington	Clermont	
Washington	Clinton	
Washington	Columbiana	
Washington	Coshocton	
Washington	Darke	
Washington	Defiance	
Washington	Franklin	
Washington	Guernsey	
Washington	Hancock	
Washington	Hardin	
Washington	Harrison	
Washington	Henry	
Washington	Highland	
Washington	Hocking	
Washington	Holmes	
Washington	Jackson	
Washington	Lawrence	
Washington	Licking	
Washington	Logan	
Washington	Lucas	
Washington	Mercer	
Washington	Miami	
Washington	Monroe	
Washington	Montgomery	
Washington	Morrow	
Washington	Muskingum	
Washington	Paulding	
Washington	Pickaway	
Washington	Preble	
Washington	Richland	
Washington	Sandusky	
Washington	Scioto	
Washington	Shelby	
Washington	Stark	
Washington	Tuscarawas	
Washington	Union	
Washington	Van Wert	
Washington	Warren	
Washington	Wood	
Waterford	Washington	
Waterloo	Athens	
Watertown	Washington	
Waterville	Lucas	
Wayne	Adams	
Wayne	Ashtabula	
Wayne	Auglaize	
Wayne	Belmont	
Wayne	Butler	
Wayne	Champaign	
Wayne	Clermont	
Wayne	Clinton	
Wayne	Columbiana	
Wayne	Darke	
Wayne	Fayette	
Wayne	Jefferson	
Wayne	Knox	
Wayne	Monroe	
Wayne	Montgomery	Defunct
Wayne	Muskingum	
Wayne	Noble	
Wayne	Pickaway	
Wayne	Tuscarawas	
Wayne	Warren	
Wayne	Wayne	
Waynesfield	Lucas	Defunct
Weathersfield	Trumbull	
Webster	Wood	
Weller	Richland	
Wellington	Lorain	
Wells	Jefferson	
Wesley	Washington	
West Chester	Butler	
West Park	Cuyahoga	Defunct
West	Columbiana	
Westfield	Medina	
Westfield	Morrow	
Westland	Guernsey	
Weston	Wood	
Wheeling	Belmont	
Wheeling	Guernsey	
Whetstone	Crawford	
White Eyes	Coshocton	
Whiteoak	Highland	
Whitewater	Hamilton	
Wilkesville	Vinton	
Williamsburg	Clermont	
Williamsfield	Ashtabula	
Willoughby	Lake	Defunct
Wills	Guernsey	
Willshire	Van Wert	
Wilson	Clinton	
Winchester	Adams	
Windham	Portage	
Windsor	Ashtabula	
Windsor	Lawrence	
Windsor	Morgan	
Woodville	Sandusky	
Wooster	Wayne	
Worthington	Richland	
Xenia	Greene	
Yellow Creek	Columbiana	
York	Athens	
York	Belmont	
York	Darke	
York	Fulton	
York	Medina	
York	Morgan	
York	Sandusky	
York	Tuscarawas	
York	Union	
York	Van Wert	
Youngstown	Mahoning	Defunct
Zane	Logan	

== See also ==
- List of counties in Ohio
- List of cities in Ohio
- List of villages in Ohio
