= Marne, Ohio =

- Census-designated place
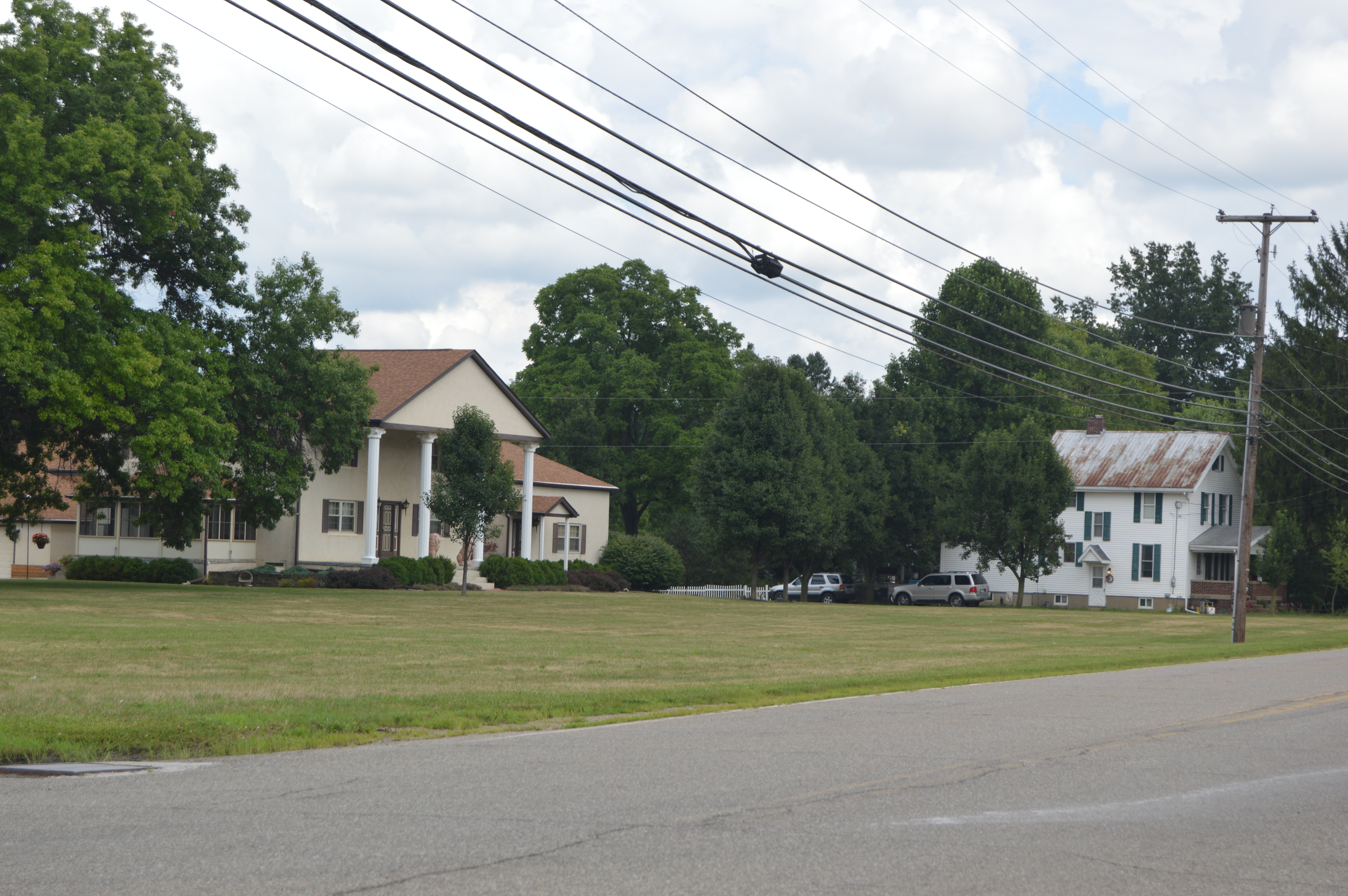
- Houses on Marne Road

- Location within Ohio Location within the United States
- Coordinates: 40°04′16″N 82°18′34″W
- Country: United States
- State: Ohio
- County: Licking
- Township: Madison

Area
  - Total: 0.88 sq mi (2.27 km^{2})
  - Land: 0.88 sq mi (2.27 km^{2})
  - Water: 0 sq mi (0.00 km^{2})
- Elevation: 801 ft (244 m)

Population (2020)
  - Total: 772
  - Density: 880/sq mi (340/km^{2})
- Time zone: UTC-5 (Eastern (EST))
  - Summer (DST): UTC-4 (EDT)
- FIPS code: 39-47950
- GNIS feature ID: 1061379

Marne is an unincorporated community and census-designated place (CDP) in Licking County, Ohio, United States. As of the 2020 census it had a population of 772.

== Geography ==
Marne is in eastern Licking County, in the eastern part of Madison Township. Ohio State Route 16 forms the southern edge of the community, leading west 5 miles (8 km) to Newark, the Licking county seat, and northeast 32 miles (51 km) to Coshocton. Marne is in the valley of the Licking River, which passes to the south of State Route 16. The Licking is an east-flowing tributary of the Muskingum River and part of the Ohio River watershed.

According to the U.S. Census Bureau, the Marne CDP has a total area of 0.9 square miles (2.3 km^{2}), of which 0.9 acres (3,568 m^{2}), or 0.16%, are water.

== Demographics ==
Historical population
Census	Pop.	Note	%±
2020	772		—
U.S. Decennial Census

As of the census of 2010, there were 783 people, 289 households, and 228 families living in the CDP. There were 301 housing units. The racial makeup of the CDP was 96.42% White, 0.64% African American, 0.13% Native American, 0.13% Asian, and 2.68% from two or more races. Hispanic or Latino of any race were 2.17% of the population.

There were 289 households, out of which 32.9% had children under the age of 18 living with them, 56.4% were married couples living together, 15.2% had a female householder with no husband present, and 21.1% were non-families. 15.9% of all households were made up of individuals, and 7.6% had someone living alone who was 65 years of age or older. The average household size was 2.71 and the average family size was 2.99.
