= Bladensburg, Ohio =

- Census-designated place
- Location within Ohio Location within the United States
- Coordinates: 40°17′5″N 82°17′2″W
- Country: United States
- State: Ohio
- County: Knox
- Townships: Clay, Jackson

Area
  - Total: 0.33 sq mi (0.86 km^{2})
  - Land: 0.33 sq mi (0.86 km^{2})
  - Water: 0 sq mi (0.00 km^{2})
- Elevation: 965 ft (294 m)

Population (2020)
  - Total: 180
  - Density: 545.2/sq mi (210.51/km^{2})
- Time zone: UTC-5 (Eastern (EST))
  - Summer (DST): UTC-4 (EDT)
- ZIP code: 43005
- Area code: 740
- FIPS code: 39-06740
- GNIS feature ID: 2628866

Bladensburg is a census-designated place (CDP) on the border between Clay and Jackson townships, Knox County, Ohio, United States. As of the 2020 census the CDP had a population of 180. It has a post office with the ZIP code 43005. It lies along State Route 541 east of Martinsburg.

== History ==
Bladensburg was originally spelled "Bladensburgh", and under the latter name was laid out in 1833. A post office has been in operation at Bladensburg(h) since 1834.

Bladensburg is the former home of East Knox Elementary School.

Bladensburg is also home to the Bladensburg Volunteer Fire Department, with 42 volunteer firefighters. It is the main station for the Bladensburg Joint Fire District.

Bladensburg is the home of a popular annual Christmas parade, which has been held since 1971.

== Demographics ==
Historical population
Census	Pop.	Note	%±
2020	180		—
U.S. Decennial Census
