= Falls Township, Ohio =

Falls Township, Ohio, may refer to:

- Falls Township, Hocking County, Ohio
- Falls Township, Muskingum County, Ohio

== See also ==
- Fallsbury Township, Licking County, Ohio
