= Hanover Township, Ohio =

Hanover Township, Ohio, may refer to:

- Hanover Township, Ashland County, Ohio
- Hanover Township, Butler County, Ohio
- Hanover Township, Columbiana County, Ohio
- Hanover Township, Licking County, Ohio
