= Newton Township, Licking County, Ohio =

Township in Ohio, US

- Township
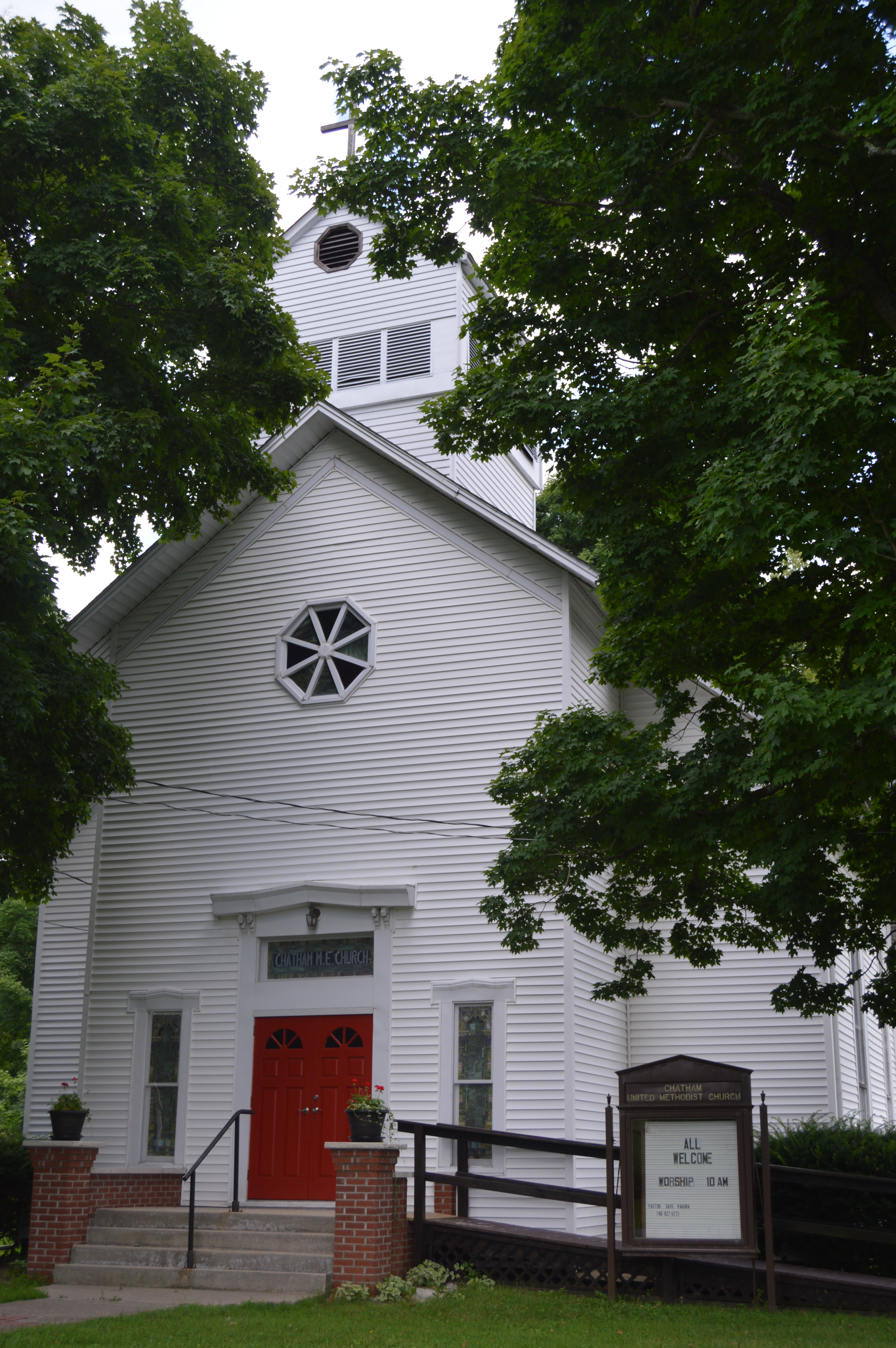
- Methodist church in Chatham

- Location of Newton Township in Licking County
- Coordinates: 40°8′51″N 82°25′26″W
- Country: United States
- State: Ohio
- County: Licking

Area
  - Total: 23.4 sq mi (60.7 km^{2})
  - Land: 23.2 sq mi (60.0 km^{2})
  - Water: 0.27 sq mi (0.7 km^{2})
- Elevation: 869 ft (265 m)

Population (2020)
  - Total: 3,194
  - Density: 138/sq mi (53.2/km^{2})
- Time zone: UTC-5 (Eastern (EST))
  - Summer (DST): UTC-4 (EDT)
- FIPS code: 39-55580
- GNIS feature ID: 1086475
- Website: newtontownshiplc.com

Newton Township is one of the 25 townships of Licking County, Ohio, United States. As of the 2020 census, the population was 3,194.

== Geography ==
Located in the northern part of the county, it borders the following townships and city:

- Washington Township - north
- Eden Township - northeast
- Mary Ann Township - east
- Madison Township - southeast corner
- Newark Township - south
- Newark - south
- Granville Township - southwest
- McKean Township - west

The village of St. Louisville is located in the township's north.

== Name and history ==
It is one of five Newton Townships statewide.

== Government ==
The township is governed by a three-member board of trustees, who are elected in November of odd-numbered years to a four-year term beginning on the following January 1. Two are elected in the year after the presidential election and one is elected in the year before it. There is also an elected township fiscal officer, who serves a four-year term beginning on April 1 of the year after the election, which is held in November of the year before the presidential election. Vacancies in the fiscal officership or on the board of trustees are filled by the remaining trustees.
