= West Carlisle, Ohio =

Unincorporated community in Ohio, U.S.

Coordinates: 40°13′44″N 82°07′06″W

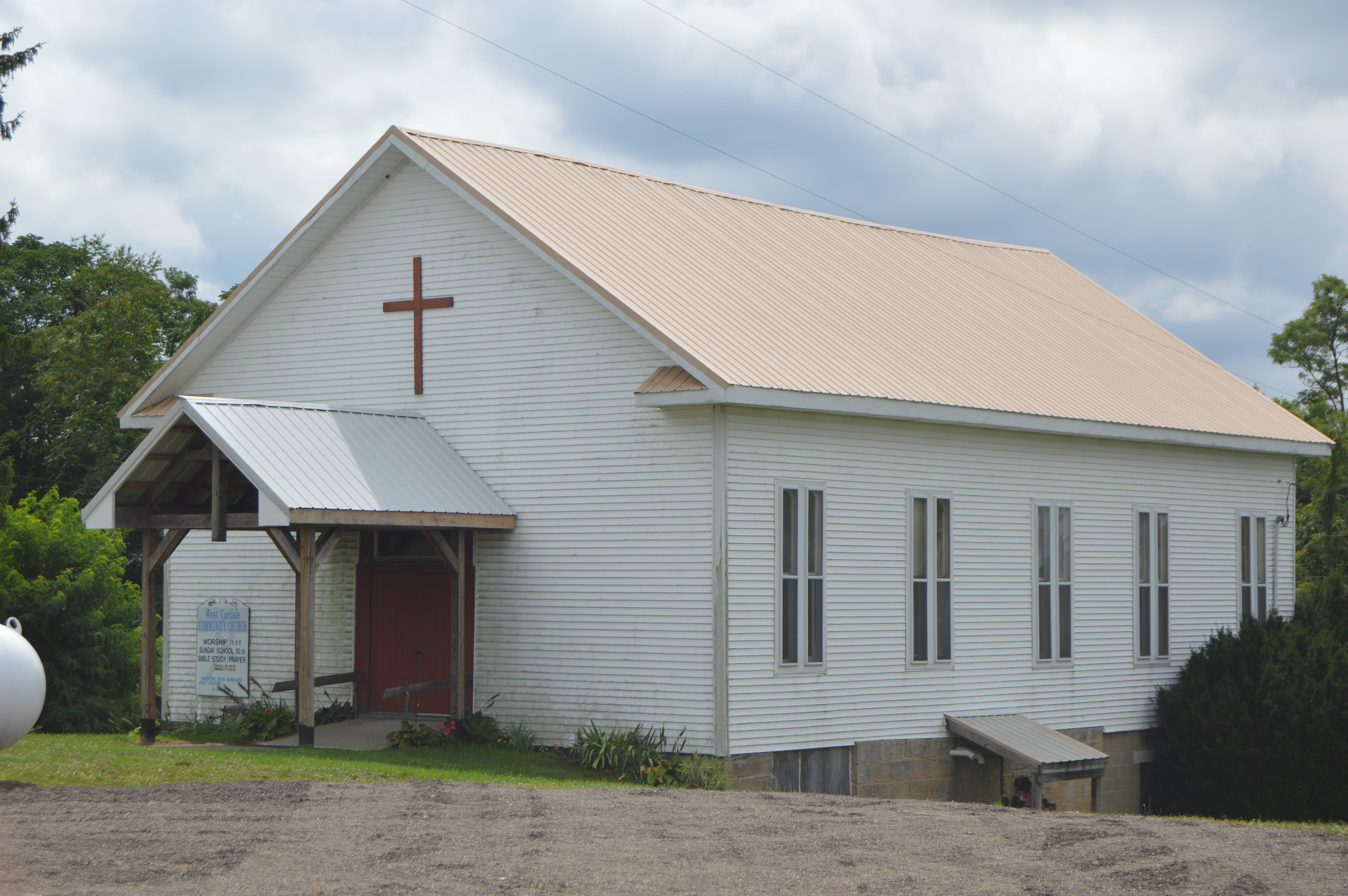
West Carlisle Community Church

West Carlisle is an unincorporated community in Pike Township, Coshocton County, Ohio, United States.

== History ==
West Carlisle was laid out in August 1817. The community most likely derived its name from Carlisle, Pennsylvania, the birthplace of a first settler. A post office was established at West Carlisle in 1822, and remained in operation until 1932.
