= Franklin Township, Ohio =

Franklin Township, Ohio, may refer to:

- Franklin Township, Adams County, Ohio
- Franklin Township, Brown County, Ohio
- Franklin Township, Clermont County, Ohio
- Franklin Township, Columbiana County, Ohio
- Franklin Township, Coshocton County, Ohio
- Franklin Township, Darke County, Ohio
- Franklin Township, Franklin County, Ohio
- Franklin Township, Fulton County, Ohio
- Franklin Township, Harrison County, Ohio
- Franklin Township, Jackson County, Ohio
- Franklin Township, Licking County, Ohio
- Franklin Township, Mercer County, Ohio
- Franklin Township, Monroe County, Ohio
- Franklin Township, Morrow County, Ohio
- Franklin Township, Portage County, Ohio
- Franklin Township, Richland County, Ohio
- Franklin Township, Ross County, Ohio
- Franklin Township, Shelby County, Ohio
- Franklin Township, Tuscarawas County, Ohio
- Franklin Township, Warren County, Ohio
- Franklin Township, Wayne County, Ohio
