= Washington Township, Licking County, Ohio =

Township in Ohio, US

- Township
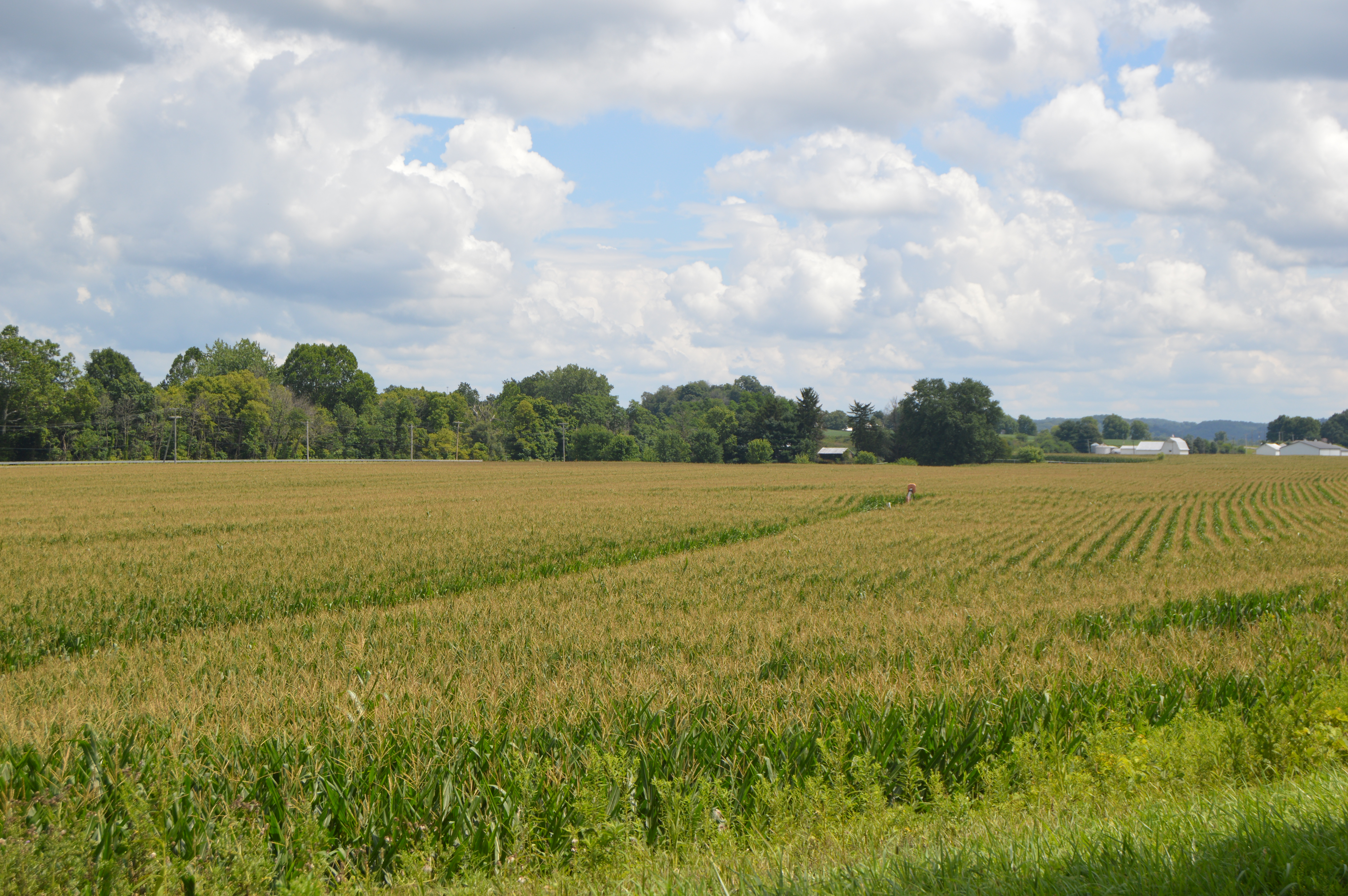
- Farmland north of St. Louisville

- Location in Licking County
- Coordinates: 40°12′35″N 82°25′00″W
- Country: United States
- State: Ohio
- County: Licking

Area
  - Total: 23.7 sq mi (61.4 km^{2})
  - Land: 23.5 sq mi (60.8 km^{2})
  - Water: 0.23 sq mi (0.6 km^{2})
- Elevation: 980 ft (300 m)

Population (2020)
  - Total: 2,992
  - Density: 127/sq mi (49.2/km^{2})
- Time zone: UTC-5 (Eastern (EST))
  - Summer (DST): UTC-4 (EDT)
- FIPS code: 39-81410
- GNIS feature ID: 1086480
- Website: washingtontwplicking.com

Washington Township is one of the 25 townships of Licking County, Ohio, United States. As of the 2020 census, the population was 2,992.

== Geography ==
Located on the northern edge of the county, it borders the following townships:

- Morgan Township, Knox County - north
- Clay Township, Knox County - northeast
- Eden Township - east
- Newton Township - south
- McKean Township - southwest
- Burlington Township - west

Most of the village of Utica is located in northwestern Washington Township.

== Name and history ==
It is one of 43 Washington Townships statewide.

== Government ==
The township is governed by a three-member board of trustees, who are elected in November of odd-numbered years to a four-year term beginning on the following January 1. Two are elected in the year after the presidential election and one is elected in the year before it. There is also an elected township fiscal officer, who serves a four-year term beginning on April 1 of the year after the election, which is held in November of the year before the presidential election. Vacancies in the fiscal officership or on the board of trustees are filled by the remaining trustees.
