= Mary Ann Township, Licking County, Ohio =

Township in Ohio, US

- Township
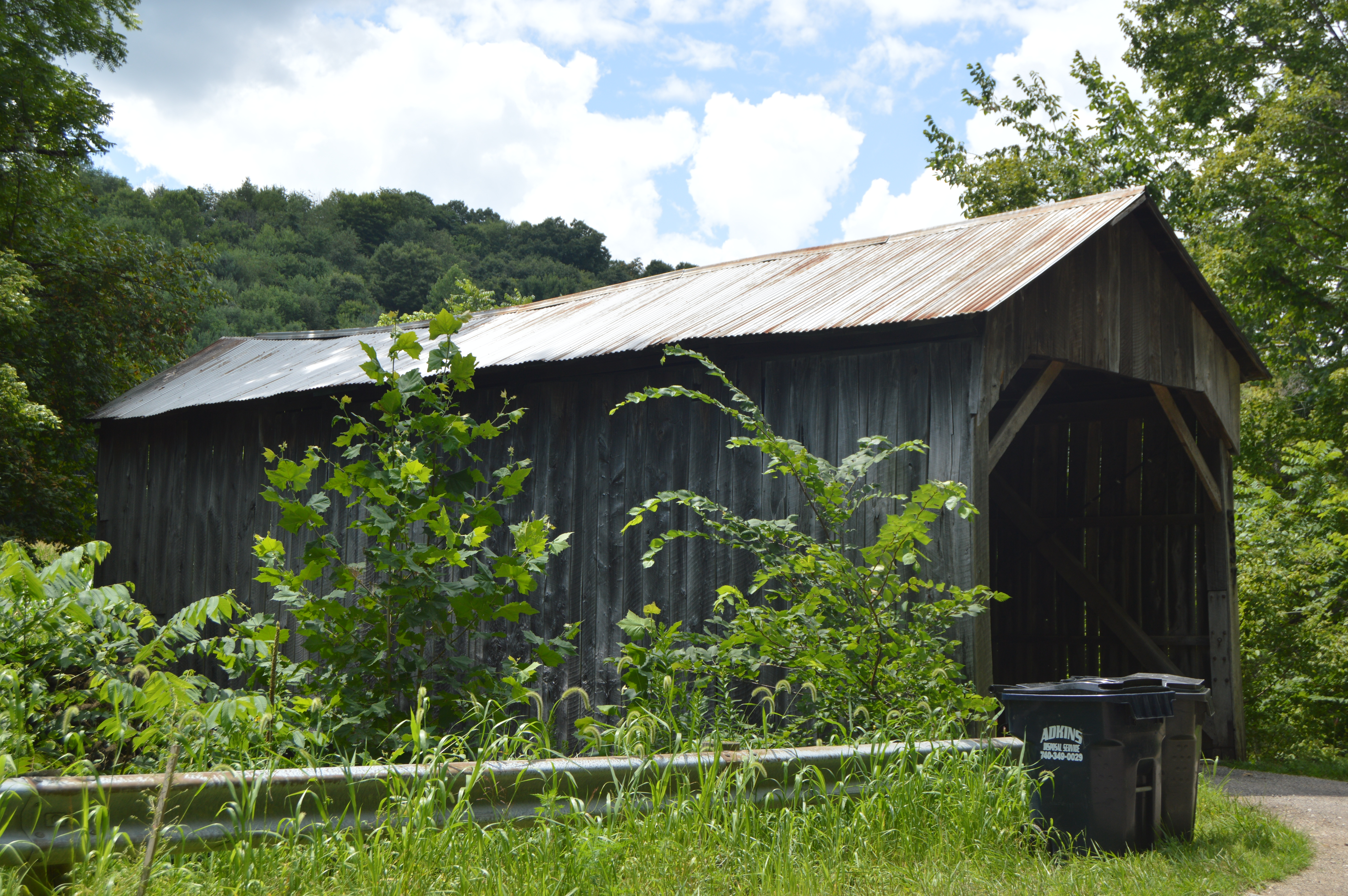
- Private covered bridge on Hickman Road

- Location of Mary Ann Township in Licking County
- Coordinates: 40°8′21″N 82°19′7″W
- Country: United States
- State: Ohio
- County: Licking

Area
  - Total: 23.2 sq mi (60.1 km^{2})
  - Land: 23.1 sq mi (59.9 km^{2})
  - Water: 0.077 sq mi (0.2 km^{2})
- Elevation: 892 ft (272 m)

Population (2020)
  - Total: 2,120
  - Density: 91.7/sq mi (35.4/km^{2})
- Time zone: UTC-5 (Eastern (EST))
  - Summer (DST): UTC-4 (EDT)
- FIPS code: 39-48132
- GNIS feature ID: 1086471
- Website: https://www.maryanntownship.us/

Mary Ann Township is one of the 25 townships of Licking County, Ohio, United States. As of the 2020 census, the population was 2,120.

== Geography ==
Located in the northeastern part of the county, it borders the following townships:

- Eden Township - north
- Fallsbury Township - northeast corner
- Perry Township - east
- Madison Township - south
- Newark Township - southwest corner
- Newton Township - west

No municipalities are located in Mary Ann Township.

== Name and history ==
It is the only Mary Ann Township statewide.

== Government ==
The township is governed by a three-member board of trustees, who are elected in November of odd-numbered years to a four-year term beginning on the following January 1. Two are elected in the year after the presidential election and one is elected in the year before it. There is also an elected township fiscal officer, who serves a four-year term beginning on April 1 of the year after the election, which is held in November of the year before the presidential election. Vacancies in the fiscal officership or on the board of trustees are filled by the remaining trustees.
