= Pike Township, Coshocton County, Ohio =

Township in Ohio, US

- Township
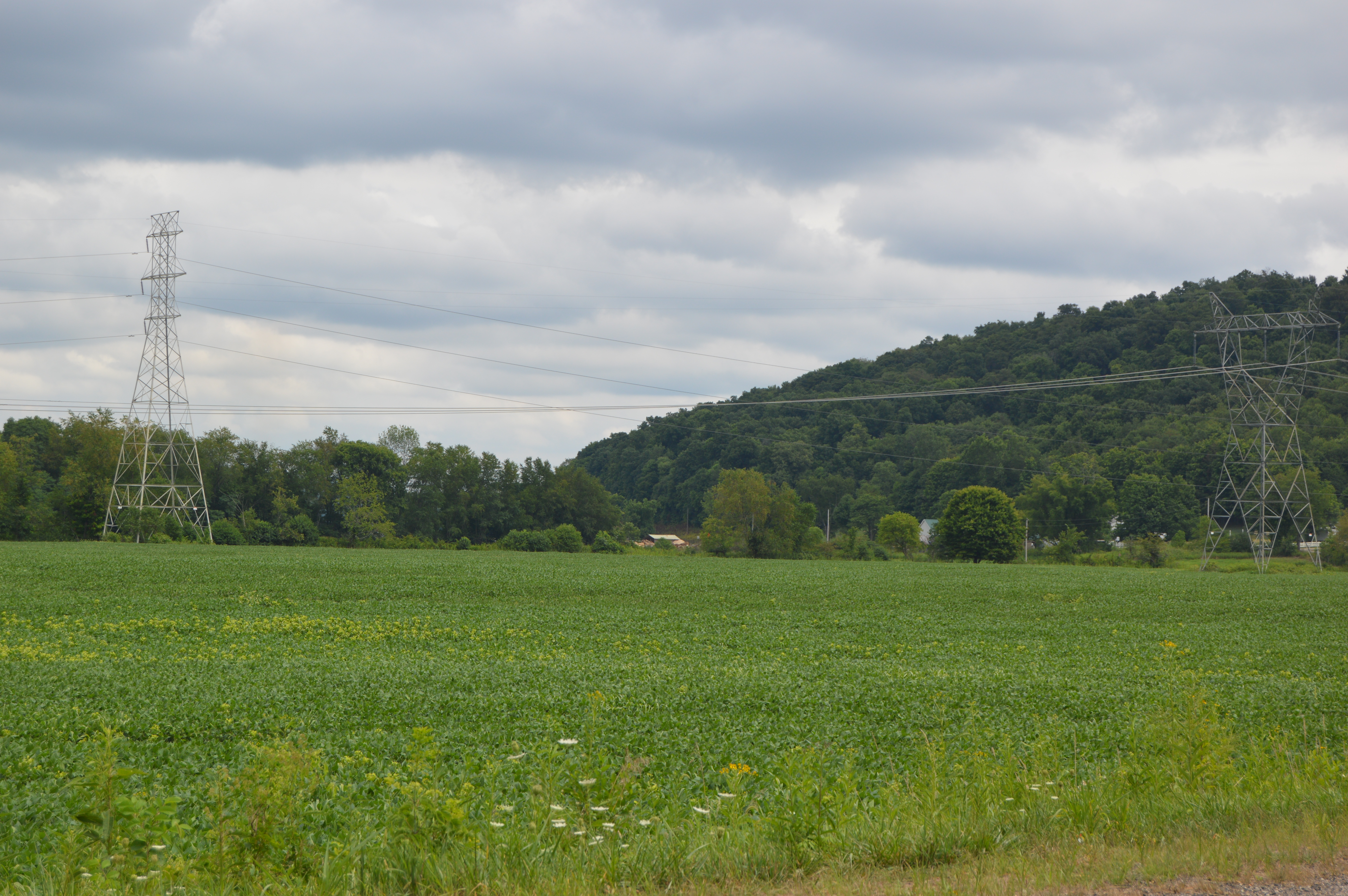
- Along State Route 79 in the township's far west

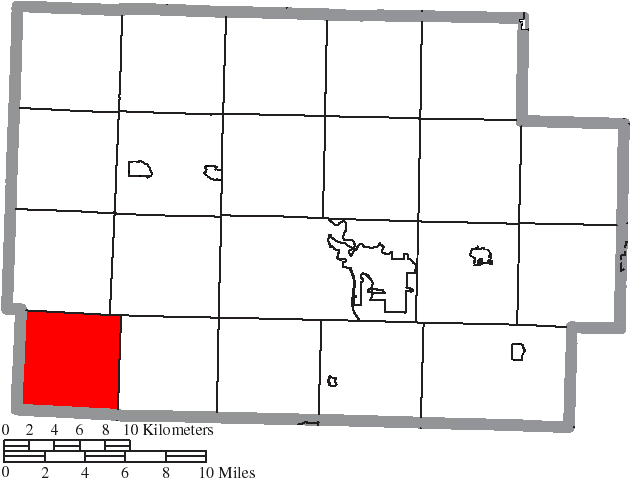
- Location of Pike Township in Coshocton County
- Coordinates: 40°12′0″N 82°8′17″W
- Country: United States
- State: Ohio
- County: Coshocton

Area
  - Total: 24.6 sq mi (63.6 km^{2})
  - Land: 24.6 sq mi (63.6 km^{2})
  - Water: 0 sq mi (0.0 km^{2})
- Elevation: 1,004 ft (306 m)

Population (2020)
  - Total: 689
  - Density: 28.1/sq mi (10.8/km^{2})
- Time zone: UTC-5 (Eastern (EST))
  - Summer (DST): UTC-4 (EDT)
- FIPS code: 39-62624
- GNIS feature ID: 1085926

Pike Township is one of the twenty-two townships of Coshocton County, Ohio, United States. As of the 2020 census the population was 689.

== Geography ==
Located in the southwestern corner of the county, it borders the following townships:

- Perry Township - north
- Bedford Township - northeast
- Washington Township - east
- Cass Township, Muskingum County - southeast corner
- Jackson Township, Muskingum County - south
- Perry Township, Licking County - southwest
- Fallsbury Township, Licking County - west

No municipalities are located in Pike Township, although the unincorporated community of West Carlisle lies in the township's northeast.

Topographical features in Pike Township include the Ashcraft and Graham Ridges.

== Name and history ==
It is one of eight Pike Townships statewide.

Pike Township was organized in August, 1818.

== Government ==
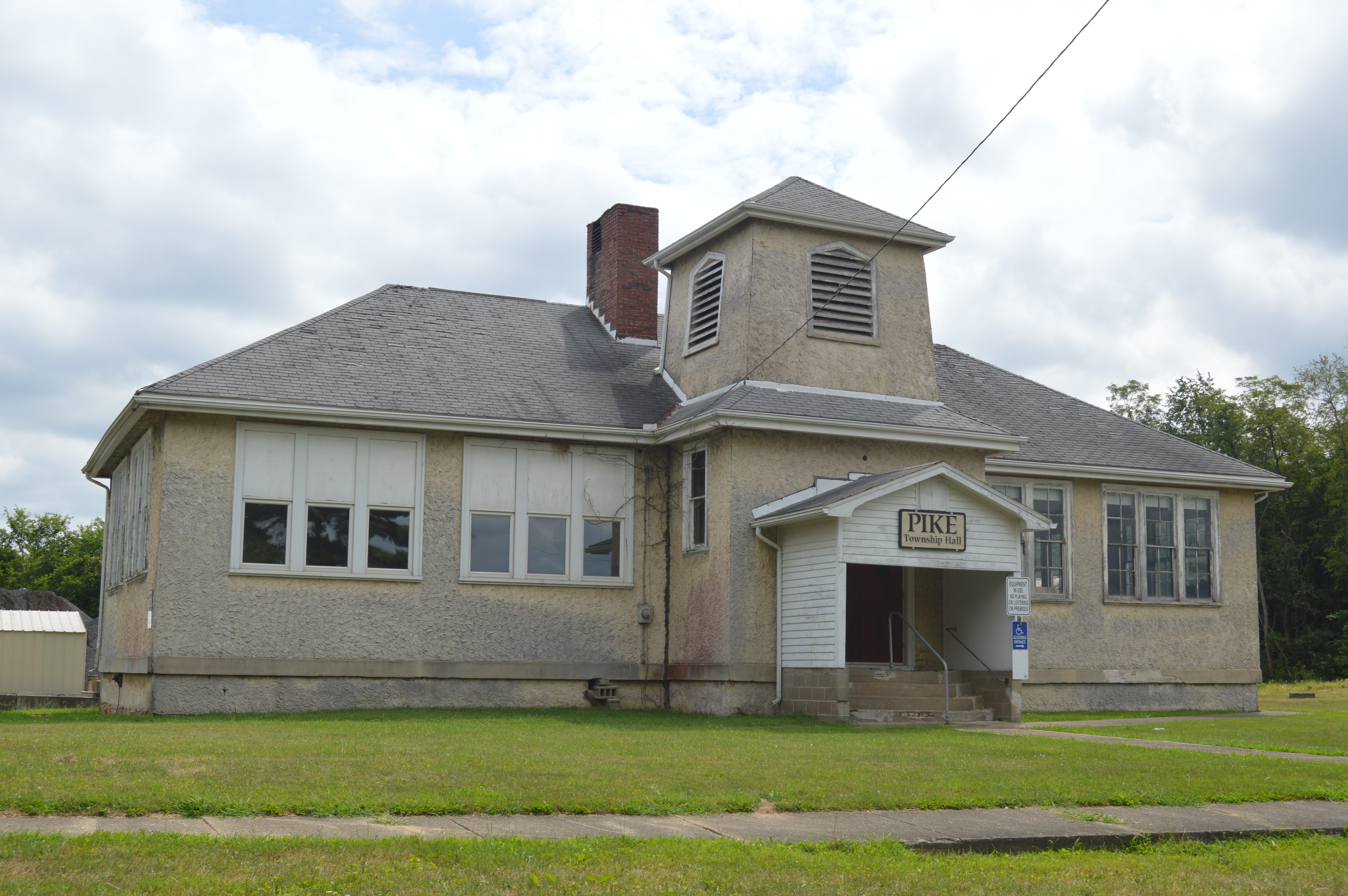
Pike Township hall in West Carlisle

The township is governed by a three-member board of trustees, who are elected in November of odd-numbered years to a four-year term beginning on the following January 1. Two are elected in the year after the presidential election and one is elected in the year before it. There is also an elected township fiscal officer, who serves a four-year term beginning on April 1 of the year after the election, which is held in November of the year before the presidential election. Vacancies in the fiscal officership or on the board of trustees are filled by the remaining trustees.
