= Perry Township, Licking County, Ohio =

Township in Ohio, US

- Township
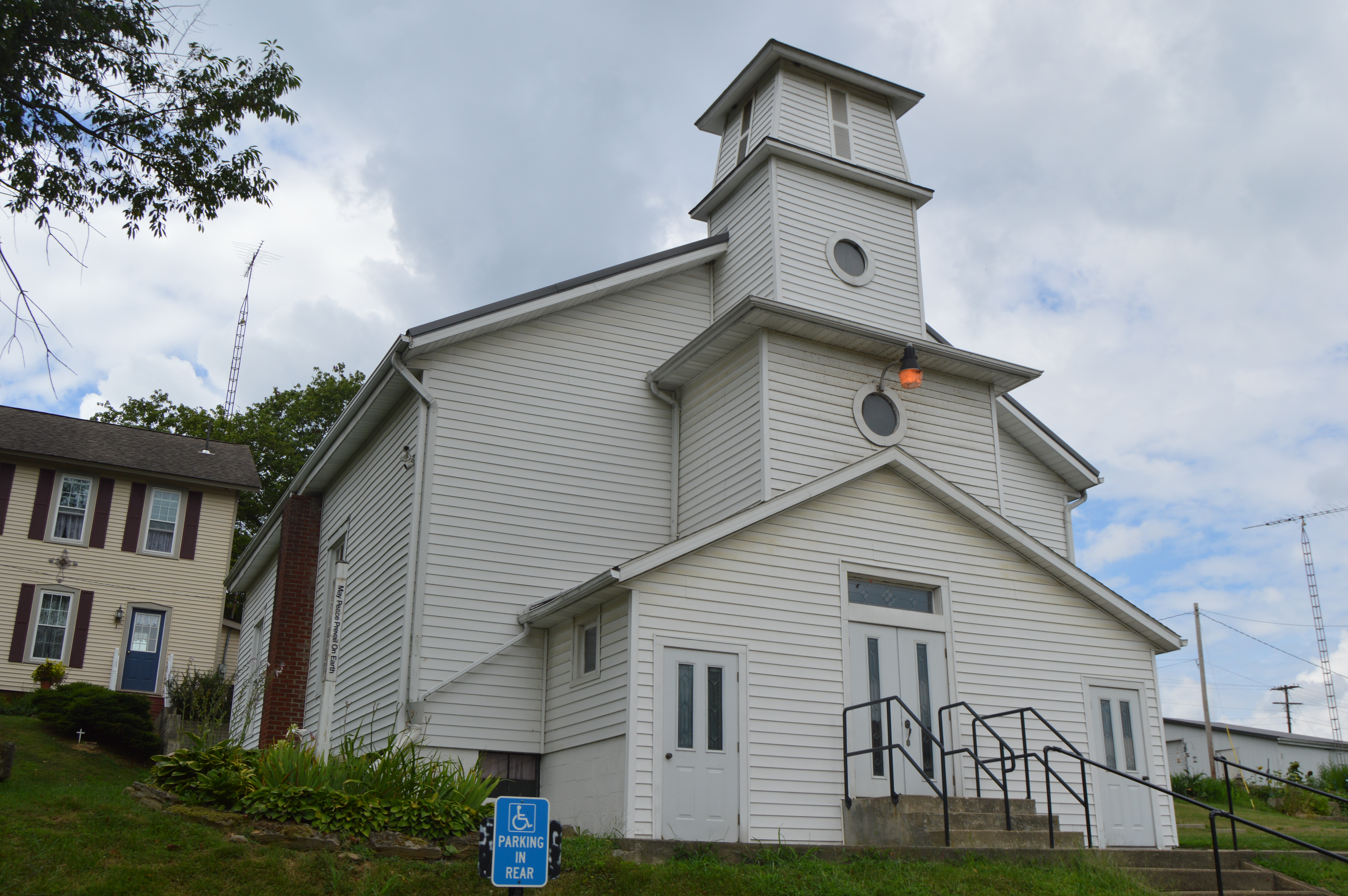
- Methodist church at Perryton

- Location of Perry Township in Licking County
- Coordinates: 40°8′22″N 82°13′53″W
- Country: United States
- State: Ohio
- County: Licking

Area
  - Total: 25.0 sq mi (64.8 km^{2})
  - Land: 24.9 sq mi (64.6 km^{2})
  - Water: 0.077 sq mi (0.2 km^{2})
- Elevation: 850 ft (259 m)

Population (2020)
  - Total: 1,671
  - Density: 67.0/sq mi (25.9/km^{2})
- Time zone: UTC-5 (Eastern (EST))
  - Summer (DST): UTC-4 (EDT)
- FIPS code: 39-61924
- GNIS feature ID: 1086477
- Website: https://www.perry-township.com/

Perry Township is one of the 25 townships of Licking County, Ohio, United States. As of the 2020 census the population was 1,671.

== Geography ==
Located on the eastern edge of the county, it borders the following townships:

- Fallsbury Township - north
- Pike Township, Coshocton County - northeast
- Jackson Township, Muskingum County - east
- Licking Township, Muskingum County - southeast corner
- Hanover Township - south
- Madison Township - southwest
- Mary Ann Township - west
- Eden Township - northwest corner

No municipalities are located in Perry Township.

== Name and history ==
It is one of 26 Perry Townships statewide.

== Government ==
The township is governed by a three-member board of trustees, who are elected in November of odd-numbered years to a four-year term beginning on the following January 1. Two are elected in the year after the presidential election and one is elected in the year before it. There is also an elected township fiscal officer, who serves a four-year term beginning on April 1 of the year after the election, which is held in November of the year before the presidential election. Vacancies in the fiscal officership or on the board of trustees are filled by the remaining trustees.
