= Hopewell Township, Licking County, Ohio =

Township in Ohio, US

- Township
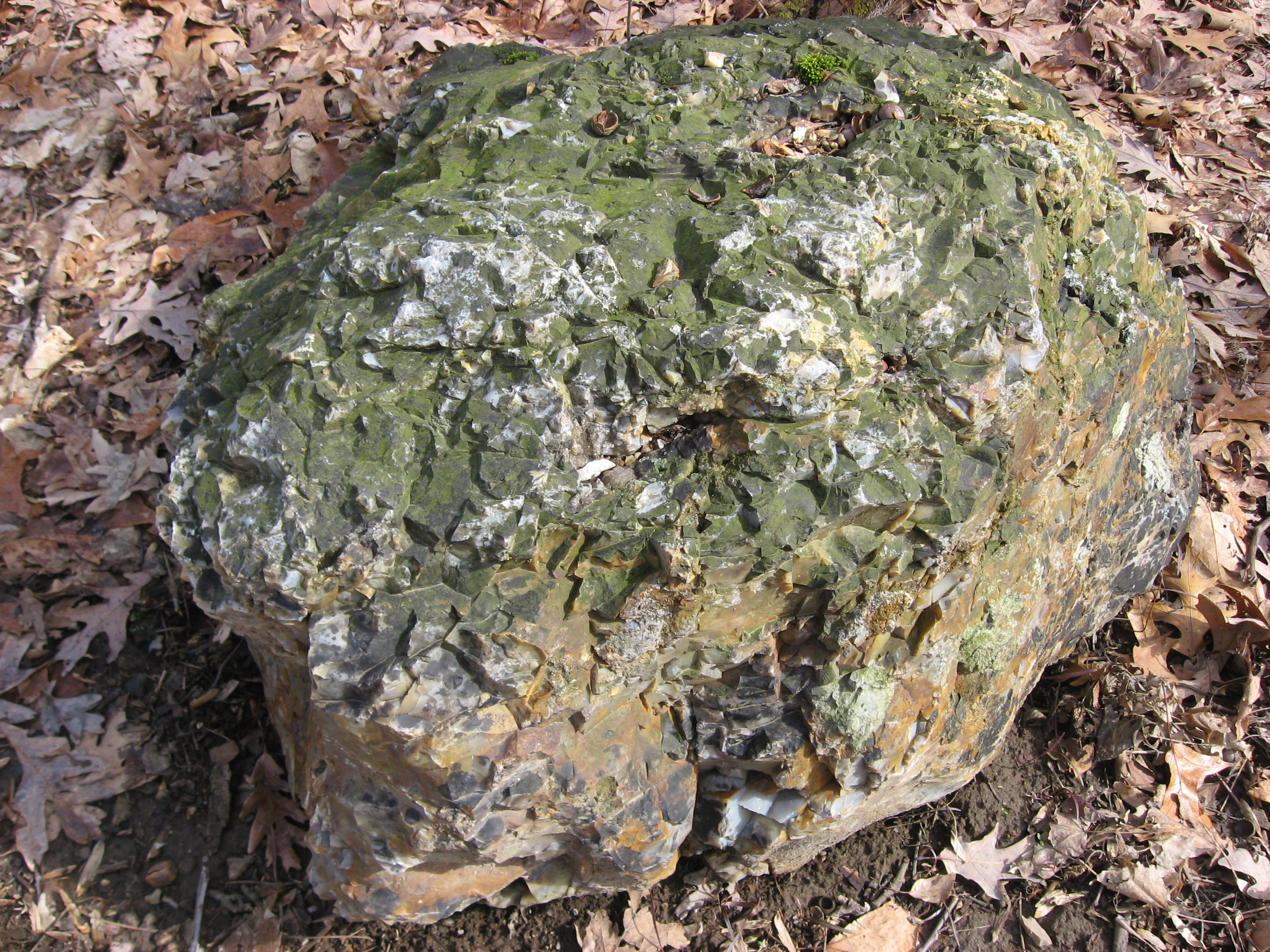
- One of numerous prehistoric mining sites at the Flint Ridge State Memorial

- Location of Hopewell Township in Licking County
- Coordinates: 39°58′48″N 82°14′37″W
- Country: United States
- State: Ohio
- County: Licking

Area
  - Total: 25.20 sq mi (65.27 km^{2})
  - Land: 25.15 sq mi (65.14 km^{2})
  - Water: 0.050 sq mi (0.13 km^{2})
- Elevation: 1,132 ft (345 m)

Population (2020)
  - Total: 1,395
  - Density: 55.47/sq mi (21.42/km^{2})
- Time zone: UTC-5 (Eastern (EST))
  - Summer (DST): UTC-4 (EDT)
- FIPS code: 39-36316
- GNIS feature ID: 1086464

Hopewell Township is one of the 25 townships of Licking County, Ohio, United States. As of the 2020 census the population was 1,395.

== Geography ==
Located on the eastern edge of the county, it borders the following townships:

- Hanover Township - north
- Licking Township, Muskingum County - northeast corner
- Hopewell Township, Muskingum County - east
- Bowling Green Township - south
- Franklin Township - west
- Madison Township - northwest corner

Part of the village of Gratiot is located in southeastern Hopewell Township.

== Name and history ==
It is one of five Hopewell Townships statewide.

== Government ==
The township is governed by a three-member board of trustees, who are elected in November of odd-numbered years to a four-year term beginning on the following January 1. Two are elected in the year after the presidential election and one is elected in the year before it. There is also an elected township fiscal officer, who serves a four-year term beginning on April 1 of the year after the election, which is held in November of the year before the presidential election. Vacancies in the fiscal officership or on the board of trustees are filled by the remaining trustees.
