= Jackson Township, Knox County, Ohio =

Township in Ohio, US

- Township
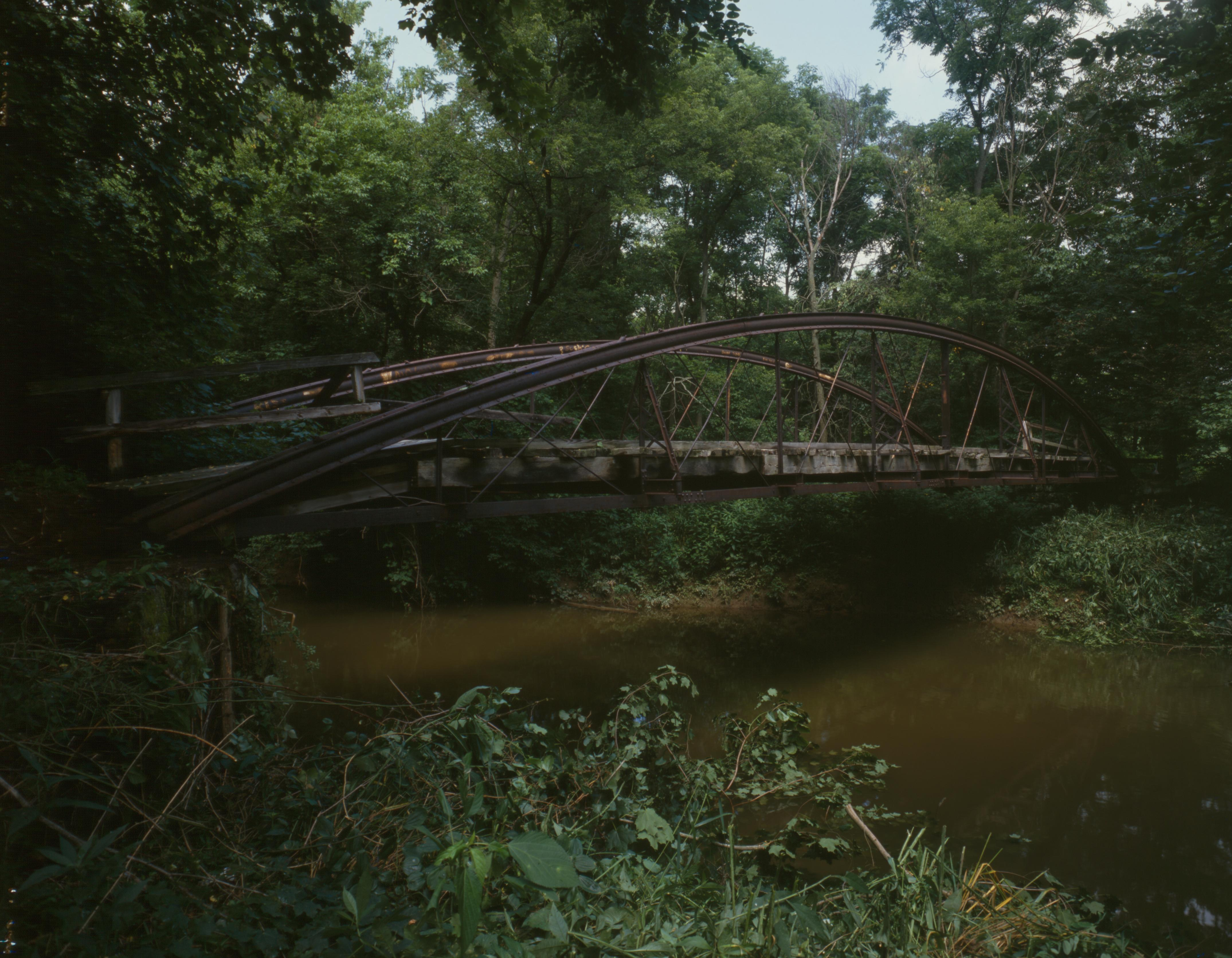
- Mill Road Bowstring Bridge over Wakatomika Creek

- Location of Jackson Township in Knox County.
- Coordinates: 40°16′45″N 82°13′59″W
- Country: United States
- State: Ohio
- County: Knox

Area
  - Total: 23.6 sq mi (61.2 km^{2})
  - Land: 23.6 sq mi (61.2 km^{2})
  - Water: 0 sq mi (0.0 km^{2})
- Elevation: 1,120 ft (340 m)

Population (2020)
  - Total: 1,076
  - Density: 45.5/sq mi (17.6/km^{2})
- Time zone: UTC-5 (Eastern (EST))
  - Summer (DST): UTC-4 (EDT)
- FIPS code: 39-37870
- GNIS feature ID: 1086401

Historical population
| Census | Pop. | Note | %± |
|---|---|---|---|
| 1990 | 680 | | — |
| 2000 | 878 | | 29.1% |
| 2010 | 988 | | 12.5% |
| 2020 | 1,076 | | 8.9% |
U.S. Census:

Jackson Township is one of the twenty-two townships of Knox County, Ohio, United States. The 2020 census found 1,076 people in the township.

== Geography ==
Located in the southeastern corner of the county, it borders the following townships:

- Butler Township - north
- Newcastle Township, Coshocton County - northeast corner
- Perry Township, Coshocton County - east
- Fallsbury Township, Licking County - south
- Eden Township, Licking County - southwest corner
- Clay Township - west
- Harrison Township - northwest corner

No municipalities are located in Jackson Township, although the census-designated place of Bladensburg lies on the western border with Clay Township.

== Name and history ==
Founded in 1815, it was named for Andrew Jackson, and it is one of thirty-seven Jackson Townships statewide.

== Government ==
The township is governed by a three-member board of trustees, who are elected in November of odd-numbered years to a four-year term beginning on the following January 1. Two are elected in the year after the presidential election and one is elected in the year before it. There is also an elected township fiscal officer, who serves a four-year term beginning on April 1 of the year after the election, which is held in November of the year before the presidential election. Vacancies in the fiscal officership or on the board of trustees are filled by the remaining trustees.
