= Madison Township, Licking County, Ohio =

Township in Ohio, US

- Township
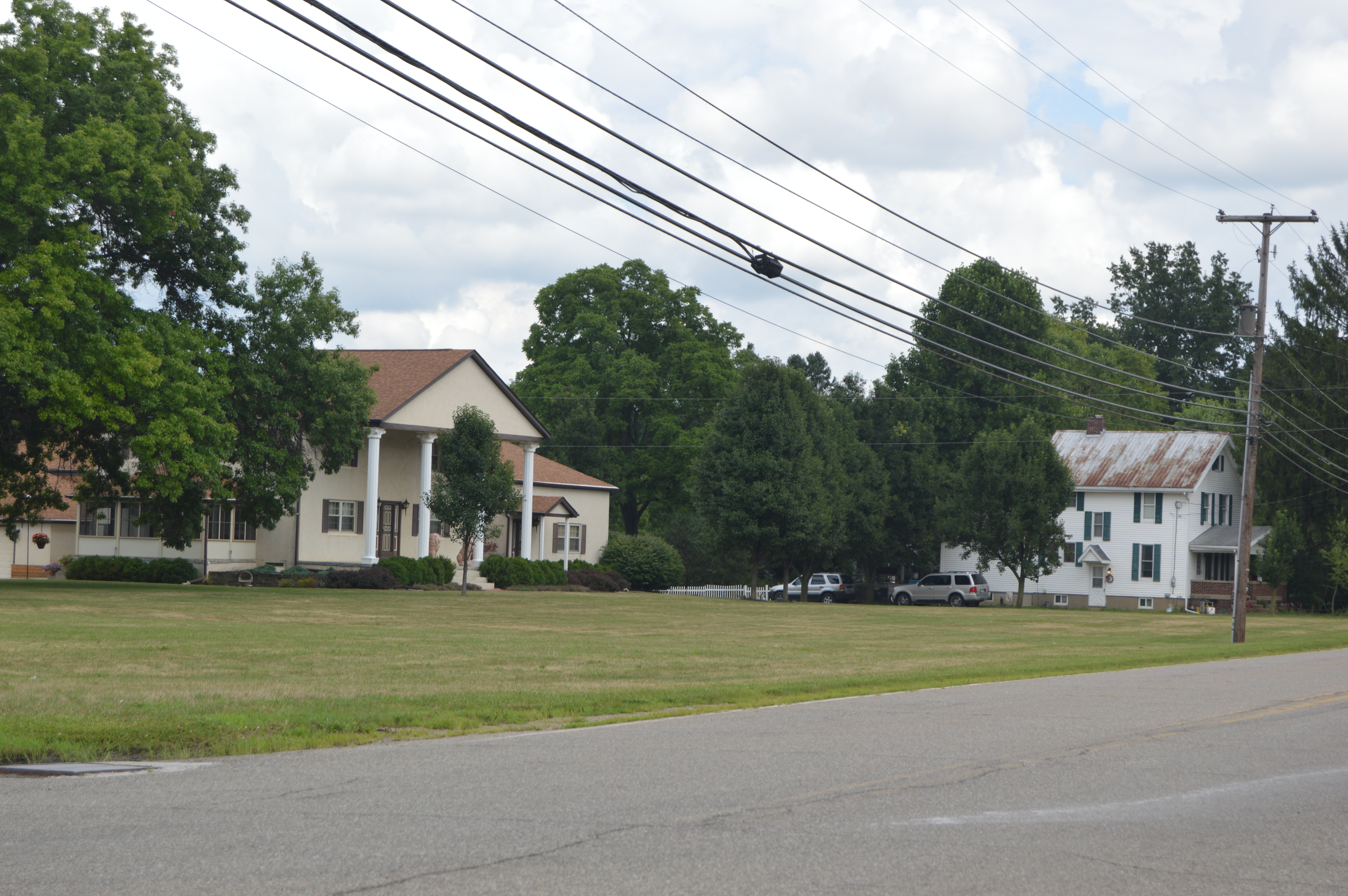
- Street scene in Marne

- Location within Licking County
- Coordinates: 40°3′32″N 82°19′39″W
- Country: United States
- State: Ohio
- County: Licking

Area
  - Total: 22.2 sq mi (57.5 km^{2})
  - Land: 22.0 sq mi (56.9 km^{2})
  - Water: 0.23 sq mi (0.6 km^{2})
- Elevation: 778 ft (237 m)

Population (2020)
  - Total: 3,248
  - Density: 148/sq mi (57.1/km^{2})
- Time zone: UTC-5 (Eastern (EST))
  - Summer (DST): UTC-4 (EDT)
- FIPS code: 39-46508
- GNIS feature ID: 1086470
- Website: www.madisontwplc.net

Madison Township is one of the 25 townships of Licking County, Ohio, United States. As of the 2020 census, the population was 3,248.

== Geography ==
Located in the eastern part of the county, it borders the following townships and cities:

- Mary Ann Township - north
- Perry Township - northeast
- Hanover Township - east
- Hopewell Township - southeast corner
- Franklin Township - south
- Heath - southwest
- Newark - west
- Newark Township - west
- Newton Township - northwest corner

The census-designated place of Marne lies in the eastern part of the township.

== Name and history ==
It is one of 20 Madison Townships statewide.

== Government ==
The township is governed by a three-member board of trustees, who are elected in November of odd-numbered years to a four-year term beginning on the following January 1. Two are elected in the year after the presidential election and one is elected in the year before it. There is also an elected township fiscal officer, who serves a four-year term beginning on April 1 of the year after the election, which is held in November of the year before the presidential election. Vacancies in the fiscal officership or on the board of trustees are filled by the remaining trustees.
