= Eden Township, Licking County, Ohio =

Township in Ohio, US

- Township
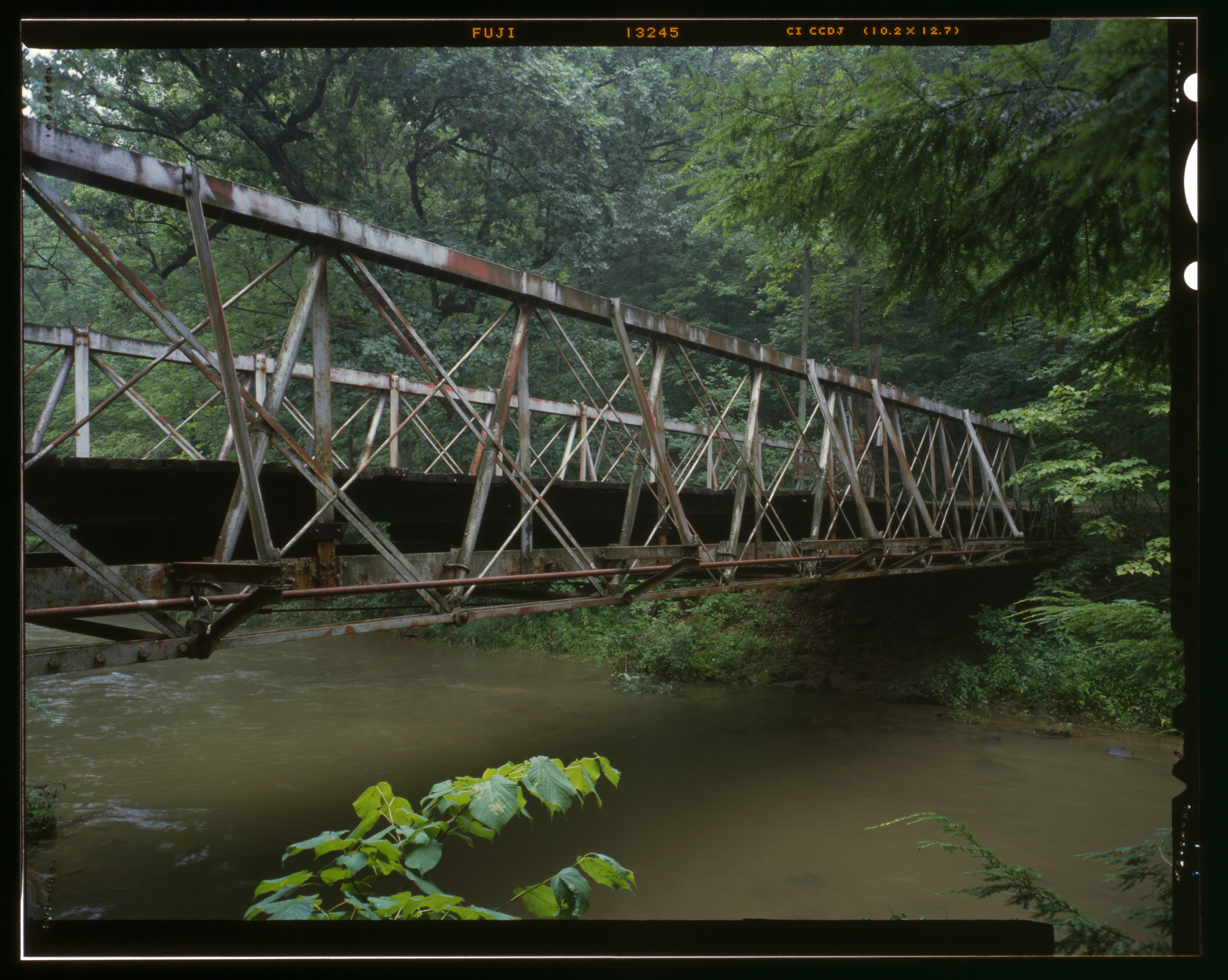
- The Falling Rock Camp Bridge over Rocky Fork Creek

- Location in Licking County
- Coordinates: 40°12′38″N 82°19′5″W
- Country: United States
- State: Ohio
- County: Licking

Area
  - Total: 21.5 sq mi (55.6 km^{2})
  - Land: 21.4 sq mi (55.5 km^{2})
  - Water: 0.039 sq mi (0.1 km^{2})
- Elevation: 1,007 ft (307 m)

Population (2020)
  - Total: 1,281
  - Density: 59.8/sq mi (23.1/km^{2})
- Time zone: UTC-5 (Eastern (EST))
  - Summer (DST): UTC-4 (EDT)
- FIPS code: 39-24332
- GNIS feature ID: 1086455
- Website: edentwplicking.com

Eden Township is one of the 25 townships of Licking County, Ohio, United States. As of the 2020 census the population was 1,281.

== Geography ==
Located on the northern edge of the county, it borders the following townships:

- Clay Township, Knox County - north
- Jackson Township, Knox County - northeast
- Fallsbury Township - east
- Perry Township - southeast corner
- Mary Ann Township - south
- Newton Township - southwest
- Washington Township - west

No municipalities are located in Eden Township.

== Name and history ==
Statewide, other Eden Townships are located in Seneca and Wyandot counties.

== Government ==
The township is governed by a three-member board of trustees, who are elected in November of odd-numbered years to a four-year term beginning on the following January 1. Two are elected in the year after the presidential election and one is elected in the year before it. There is also an elected township fiscal officer, who serves a four-year term beginning on April 1 of the year after the election, which is held in November of the year before the presidential election. Vacancies in the fiscal officership or on the board of trustees are filled by the remaining trustees.
