= Newark Township, Licking County, Ohio =

Township in Ohio, US

- Township
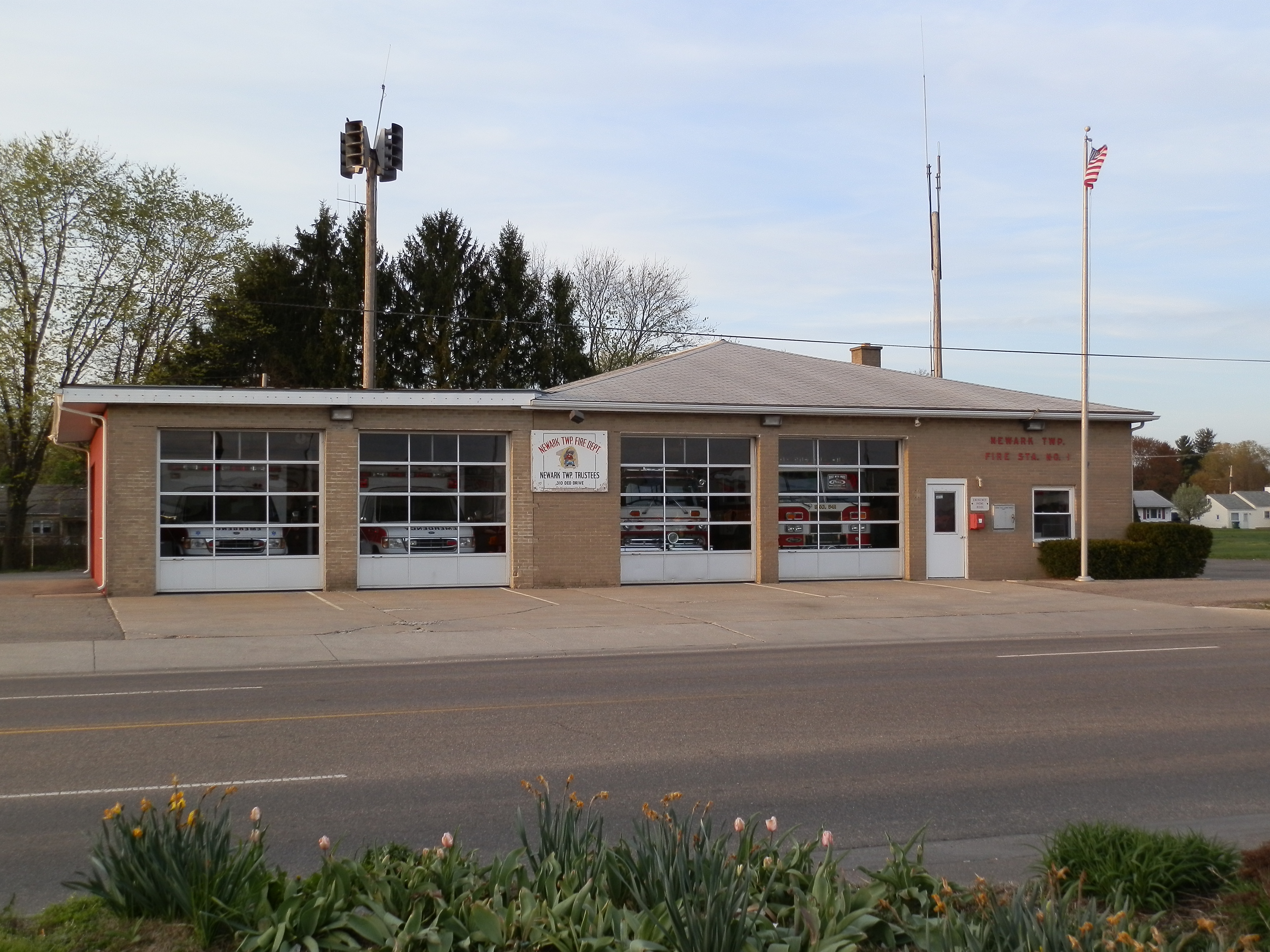
- Township fire department

- Location in Licking County
- Coordinates: 40°5′24″N 82°25′46″W
- Country: United States
- State: Ohio
- County: Licking

Area
  - Total: 6.56 sq mi (17.00 km^{2})
  - Land: 6.54 sq mi (16.93 km^{2})
  - Water: 0.027 sq mi (0.07 km^{2})
- Elevation: 869 ft (265 m)

Population (2020)
  - Total: 2,175
  - Density: 332.7/sq mi (128.5/km^{2})
- Time zone: UTC-5 (Eastern (EST))
  - Summer (DST): UTC-4 (EDT)
- ZIP codes: 43055
- Area code: 740
- FIPS code: 39-54054
- GNIS feature ID: 1086474
- Website: newarktwp.com

Newark Township is one of the 25 townships of Licking County, Ohio, United States. As of the 2020 census the population was 2,175.

== Geography ==
Located in the center of the county, it borders the following townships and city:

- Newton Township - north
- Mary Ann Township - northeast corner
- Madison Township - east
- Newark - south
- Granville Township - west

Most of the original extent of the township is occupied by the city of Newark, the county seat of Licking County, and the southern edge is now part of the city of Heath; the only remaining parts are the northeastern and northwestern corners of the original township, along with several enclaves of Newark.

== Name and history ==
It is the only Newark Township statewide.

== Government ==
The township is governed by a three-member board of trustees, who are elected in November of odd-numbered years to a four-year term beginning on the following January 1. Two are elected in the year after the presidential election and one is elected in the year before it. There is also an elected township fiscal officer, who serves a four-year term beginning on April 1 of the year after the election, which is held in November of the year before the presidential election. Vacancies in the fiscal officership or on the board of trustees are filled by the remaining trustees.

== Public Safety ==
Law Enforcement: Licking County Sheriff's Office
Fire & EMS: Newark Township Fire Dept
