= Jackson Township, Muskingum County, Ohio =

Township in Ohio, US

- Township
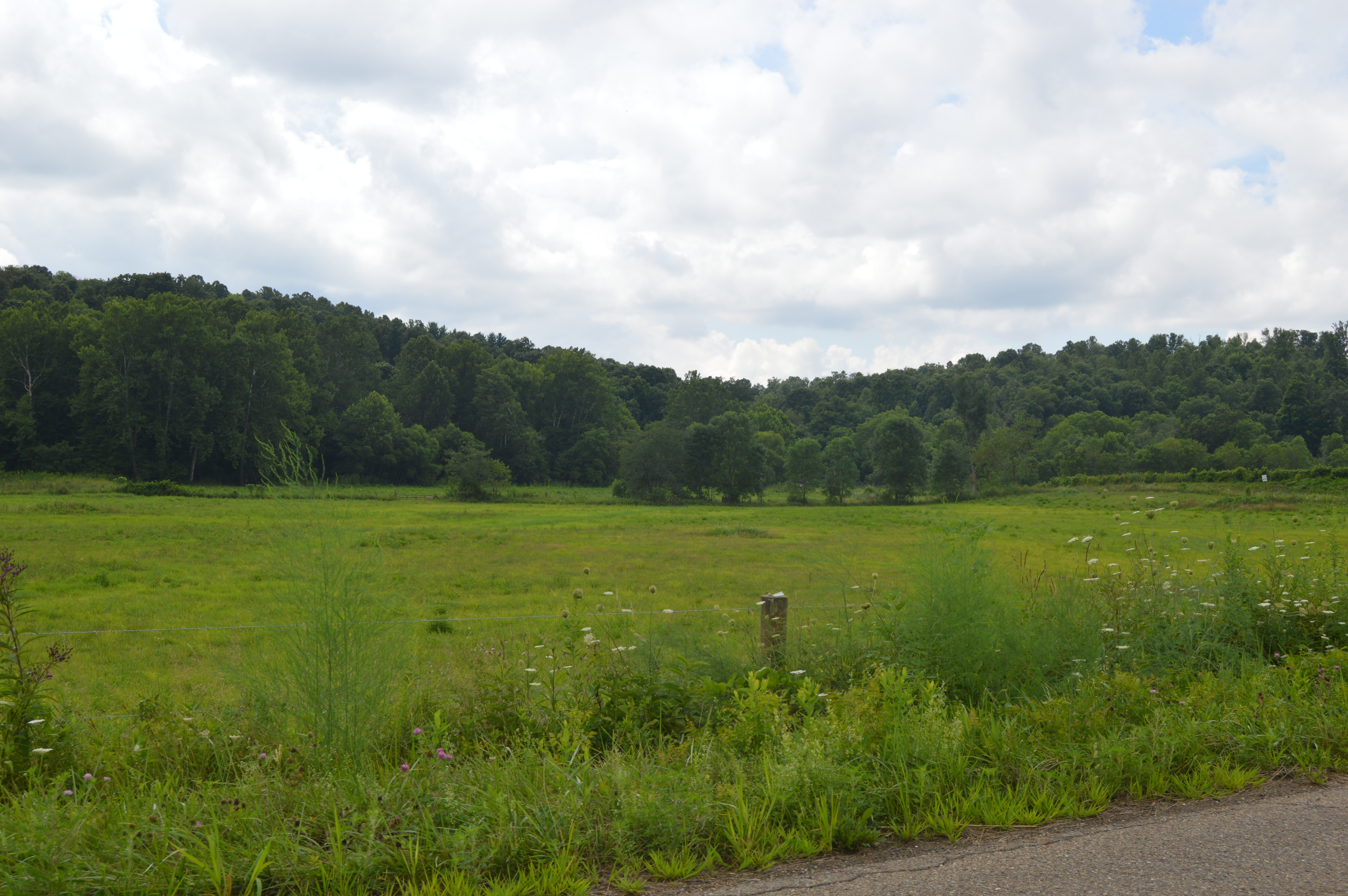
- Countryside north of Frazeysburg

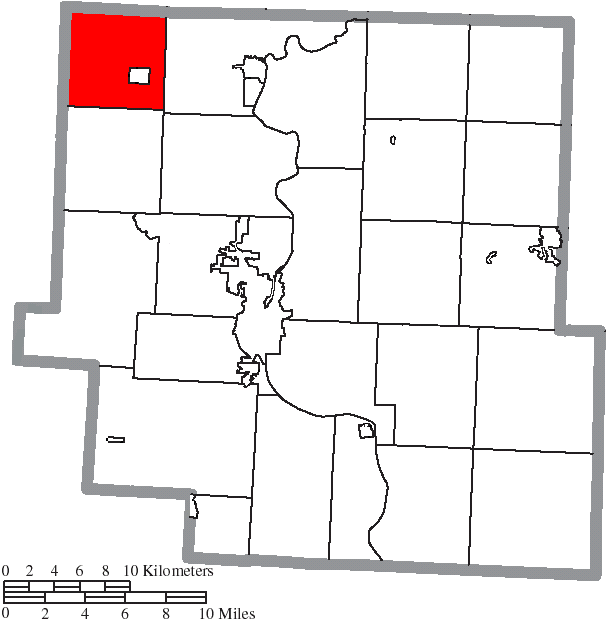
- Location of Jackson Township in Muskingum County
- Coordinates: 40°7′26″N 82°7′52″W
- Country: United States
- State: Ohio
- County: Muskingum

Area
  - Total: 24.4 sq mi (63.3 km^{2})
  - Land: 24.4 sq mi (63.2 km^{2})
  - Water: 0 sq mi (0.0 km^{2})
- Elevation: 719 ft (219 m)

Population (2020)
  - Total: 2,425
  - Density: 99.4/sq mi (38.4/km^{2})
- Time zone: UTC-5 (Eastern (EST))
  - Summer (DST): UTC-4 (EDT)
- FIPS code: 39-37926
- GNIS feature ID: 1086722

Jackson Township is one of the twenty-five townships of Muskingum County, Ohio, United States. The 2020 census found 2,425 people in the township.

== Geography ==
Located in the northwestern corner of the county, it borders the following townships:

- Pike Township, Coshocton County - north
- Washington Township, Coshocton County - northeast corner
- Cass Township - east
- Licking Township - south
- Hanover Township, Licking County - southwest corner
- Perry Township, Licking County - west

The village of Frazeysburg is located in central Jackson Township.

== Name and history ==
Established in 1815, Jackson Township most likely was named after General Andrew Jackson, afterward President of the United States. It is one of thirty-seven Jackson Townships statewide.

By the 1830s, Jackson Township had two gristmills and three saw mills.

== Government ==
The township is governed by a three-member board of trustees, who are elected in November of odd-numbered years to a four-year term beginning on the following January 1. Two are elected in the year after the presidential election and one is elected in the year before it. There is also an elected township fiscal officer, who serves a four-year term beginning on April 1 of the year after the election, which is held in November of the year before the presidential election. Vacancies in the fiscal officership or on the board of trustees are filled by the remaining trustees.
