= Clay Township, Knox County, Ohio =

Township in Ohio, US

Clay Township, Knox County Ohio
- Township
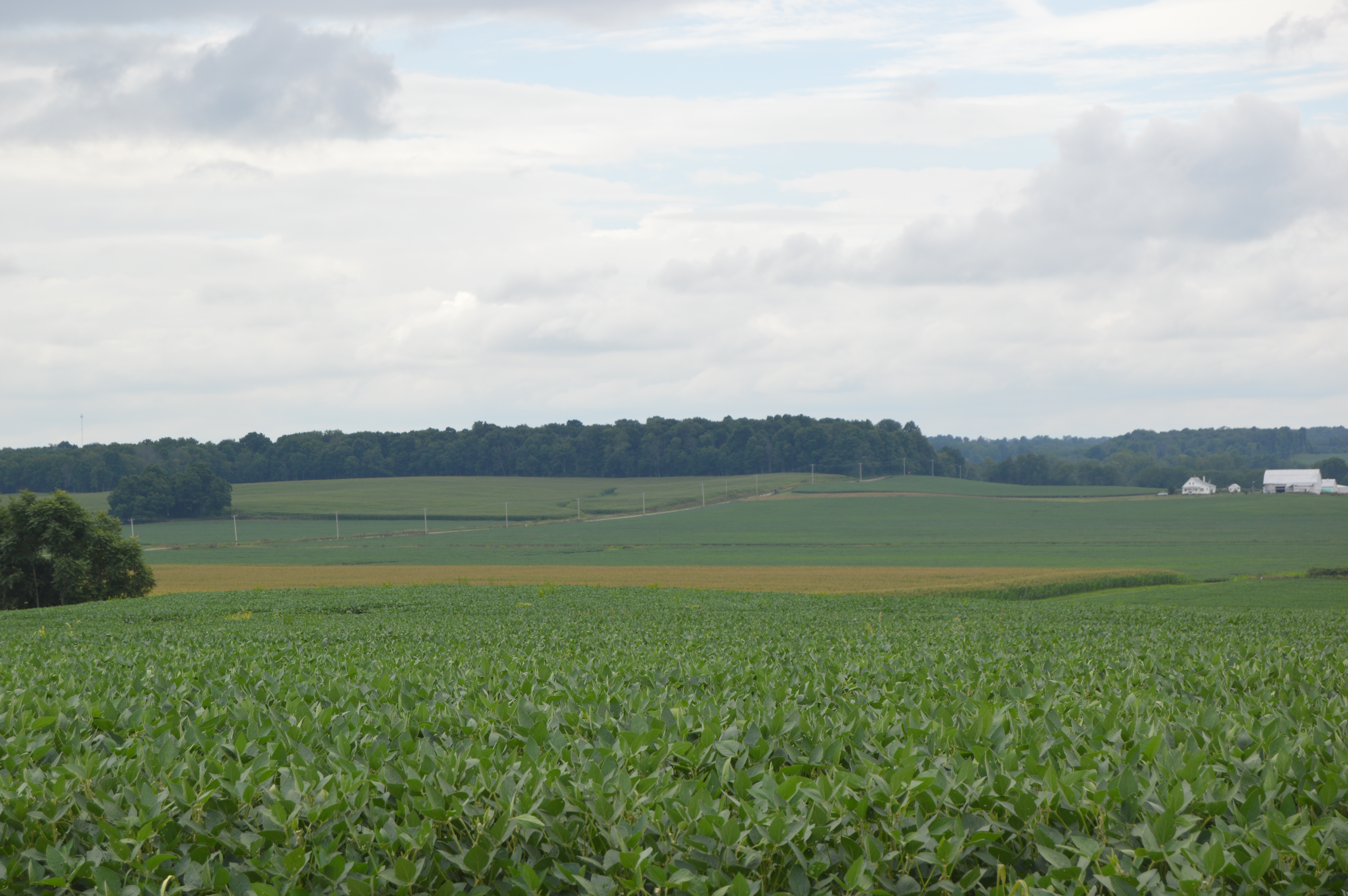
- Fields on the township's northern edge

- Location of Clay Township in Knox County.
- Coordinates: 40°16′24″N 82°19′41″W
- Country: United States
- State: Ohio
- County: Knox

Area
  - Total: 25.2 sq mi (65.2 km^{2})
  - Land: 25.2 sq mi (65.2 km^{2})
  - Water: 0 sq mi (0.0 km^{2})
- Elevation: 1,096 ft (334 m)

Population (2020)
  - Total: 1,542
  - Density: 61.3/sq mi (23.7/km^{2})
- Time zone: UTC-5 (Eastern (EST))
  - Summer (DST): UTC-4 (EDT)
- FIPS code: 39-15504
- GNIS feature ID: 1086394

Clay Township is one of the twenty-two townships of Knox County, Ohio, United States. The 2020 census found 1,542 people in the township.

== Geography ==
Located in the southeastern part of the county, it borders the following townships:

- Harrison Township - north
- Butler Township - northeast corner
- Jackson Township - east
- Fallsbury Township, Licking County - southeast corner
- Eden Township, Licking County - south
- Washington Township, Licking County - southwest
- Morgan Township - west
- Pleasant Township - northwest corner

The village of Martinsburg is located in western Clay Township, and the census-designated place of Bladensburg lies on the eastern border with Jackson Township.

== Name and history ==
Clay Township was organized in 1825. It is named for Henry Clay, a senator from Kentucky.

It is one of nine Clay Townships statewide.

== Government ==
The township is governed by a three-member board of trustees, who are elected in November of odd-numbered years to a four-year term beginning on the following January 1. Two are elected in the year after the presidential election and one is elected in the year before it. There is also an elected township fiscal officer, who serves a four-year term beginning on April 1 of the year after the election, which is held in November of the year before the presidential election. Vacancies in the fiscal officership or on the board of trustees are filled by the remaining trustees.
