= McKean Township, Licking County, Ohio =

Township in Ohio, US

- Township
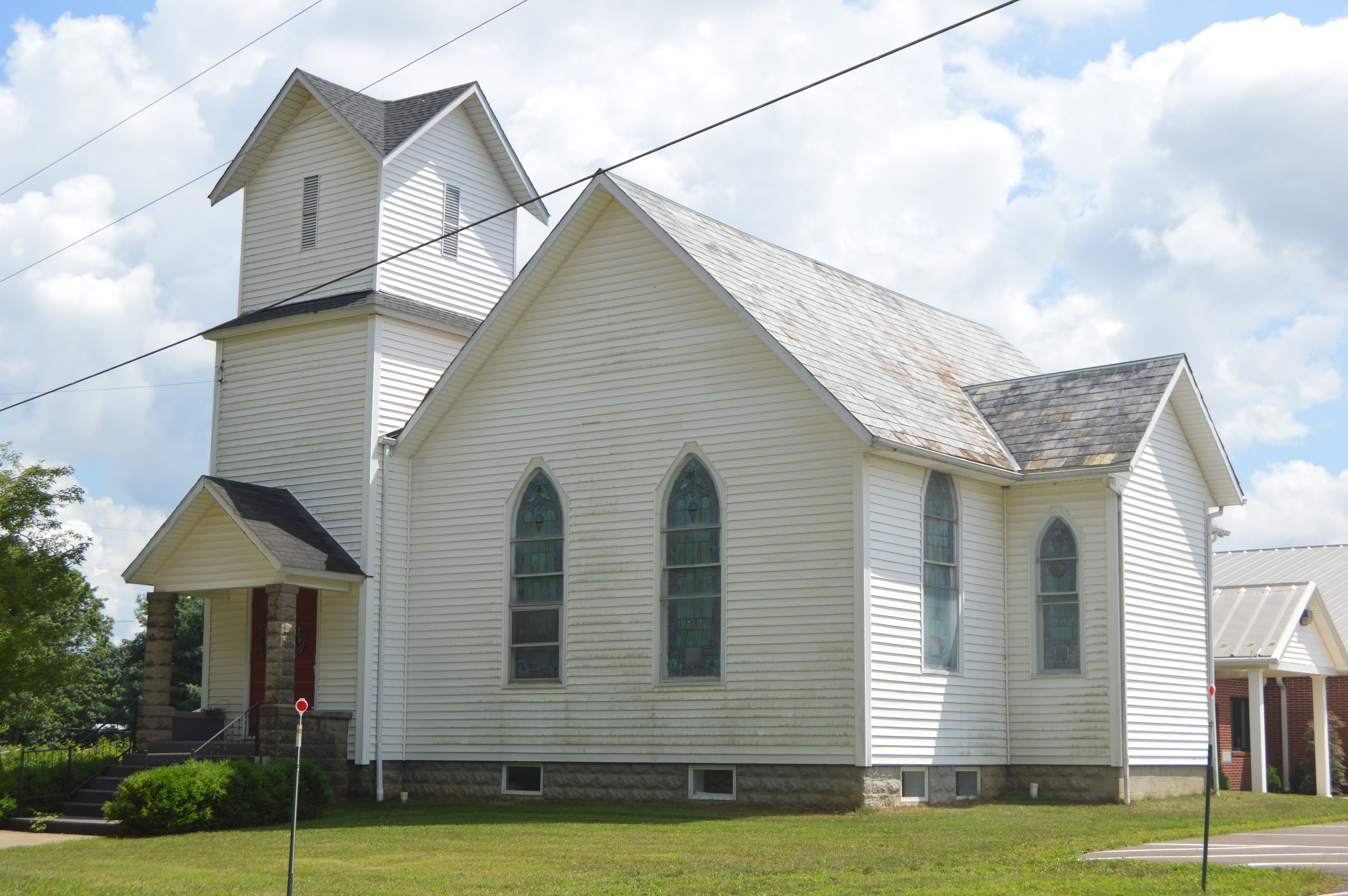
- United Church of Christ at Highwater

- Location of McKean Township in Licking County
- Coordinates: 40°8′59″N 82°31′11″W
- Country: United States
- State: Ohio
- County: Licking

Area
  - Total: 25.76 sq mi (66.72 km^{2})
  - Land: 25.66 sq mi (66.46 km^{2})
  - Water: 0.10 sq mi (0.26 km^{2})
- Elevation: 1,220 ft (372 m)

Population (2020)
  - Total: 1,606
  - Density: 62.59/sq mi (24.16/km^{2})
- Time zone: UTC-5 (Eastern (EST))
  - Summer (DST): UTC-4 (EDT)
- FIPS code: 39-46116
- GNIS feature ID: 1086469
- Website: mckeantownship.net

McKean Township is one of the 25 townships of Licking County, Ohio, United States. As of the 2020 census, the population was 1,606.

== Geography ==
Located in the northern part of the county, it borders the following townships:

- Burlington Township - north
- Washington Township - northeast
- Newton Township - east
- Granville Township - south
- St. Albans Township - southwest corner
- Liberty Township - west
- Bennington Township - northwest corner

No municipalities are located in McKean Township.

== Name and history ==
It is the only McKean Township statewide.

== Government ==
The township is governed by a three-member board of trustees, who are elected in November of odd-numbered years to a four-year term beginning on the following January 1. Two are elected in the year after the presidential election and one is elected in the year before it. There is also an elected township fiscal officer, who serves a four-year term beginning on April 1 of the year after the election, which is held in November of the year before the presidential election. Vacancies in the fiscal officership or on the board of trustees are filled by the remaining trustees.
