= St. Louisville, Ohio =

- Village
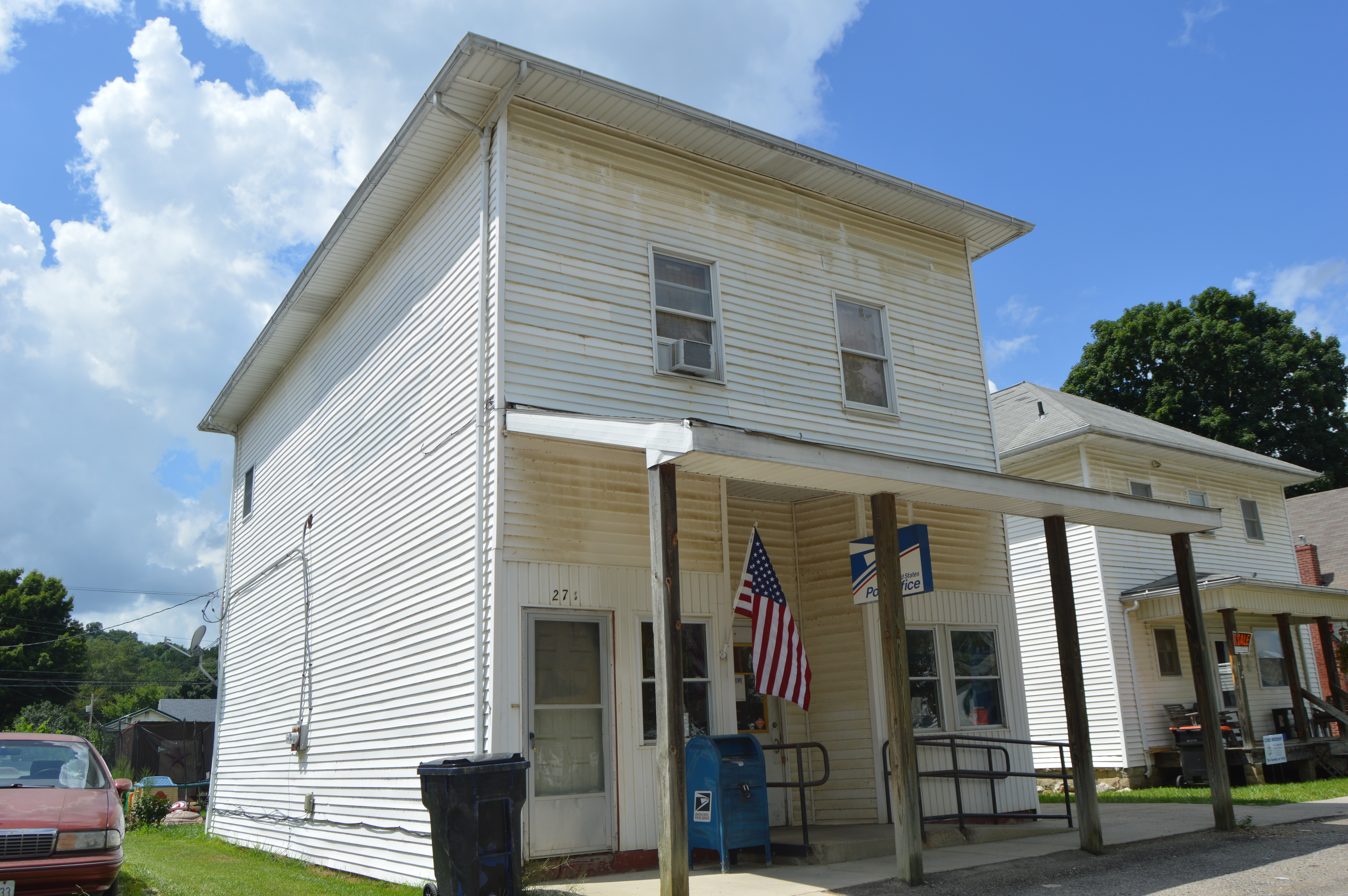
- Post office

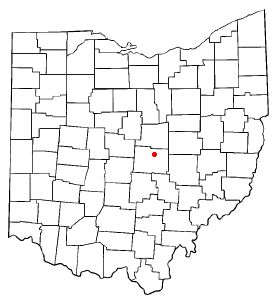
- Location of St. Louisville, Ohio

- Location of St. Louisville in Licking County
- Coordinates: 40°10′16″N 82°25′05″W
- Country: United States
- State: Ohio
- County: Licking

Area
  - Total: 0.25 sq mi (0.66 km^{2})
  - Land: 0.25 sq mi (0.66 km^{2})
  - Water: 0 sq mi (0.00 km^{2})
- Elevation: 902 ft (275 m)

Population (2020)
  - Total: 352
  - Density: 1,389.3/sq mi (536.42/km^{2})
- Time zone: UTC-5 (Eastern (EST))
  - Summer (DST): UTC-4 (EDT)
- FIPS code: 39-69652
- GNIS feature ID: 2399168

St. Louisville or Saint Louisville is a village in Licking County, Ohio, United States, along the North Fork of the Licking River. The population was 352 at the 2020 census.

St. Louisville was platted in 1839.

== Geography ==
According to the United States Census Bureau, the village has a total area of 0.25 square miles (0.65 km^{2}), all land.

== Demographics ==
Historical population
Census	Pop.	Note	%±
1850	109		—
1870	166		—
1880	215		29.5%
1890	264		22.8%
1900	285		8.0%
1910	244		−14.4%
1920	263		7.8%
1930	307		16.7%
1940	298		−2.9%
1950	336		12.8%
1960	349		3.9%
1970	385		10.3%
1980	375		−2.6%
1990	372		−0.8%
2000	346		−7.0%
2010	373		7.8%
2020	352		−5.6%
U.S. Decennial Census

=== 2010 census ===
As of the census of 2010, there were 373 people, 143 households, and 103 families living in the village. The population density was 1,492.0 inhabitants per square mile (576.1/km^{2}). There were 150 housing units at an average density of 600.0 per square mile (231.7/km^{2}). The racial makeup of the village was 97.3% White, 0.3% African American, 1.1% Native American, 0.8% from other races, and 0.5% from two or more races. Hispanic or Latino of any race were 0.8% of the population.

There were 143 households, of which 38.5% had children under the age of 18 living with them, 49.0% were married couples living together, 14.7% had a female householder with no husband present, 8.4% had a male householder with no wife present, and 28.0% were non-families. 23.1% of all households were made up of individuals, and 13.3% had someone living alone who was 65 years of age or older. The average household size was 2.61 and the average family size was 3.05.

The median age in the village was 36.1 years. 29% of residents were under the age of 18; 7.7% were between the ages of 18 and 24; 23.5% were from 25 to 44; 23.6% were from 45 to 64; and 16.1% were 65 years of age or older. The gender makeup of the village was 47.7% male and 52.3% female.

=== 2000 census ===
As of the census of 2000, there were 346 people, 119 households, and 96 families living in the village. The population density was 1,402.0 inhabitants per square mile (541.3/km^{2}). There were 127 housing units at an average density of 514.6 per square mile (198.7/km^{2}). The racial makeup of the village was 98.55% White, 0.29% Native American, and 1.16% from two or more races.

There were 119 households, out of which 38.7% had children under the age of 18 living with them, 63.9% were married couples living together, 12.6% had a female householder with no husband present, and 19.3% were non-families. 16.0% of all households were made up of individuals, and 5.9% had someone living alone who was 65 years of age or older. The average household size was 2.91 and the average family size was 3.20.

In the village, the population was spread out, with 29.2% under the age of 18, 8.7% from 18 to 24, 28.0% from 25 to 44, 23.7% from 45 to 64, and 10.4% who were 65 years of age or older. The median age was 35 years. For every 100 females there were 98.9 males. For every 100 females age 18 and over, there were 97.6 males.

The median income for a household in the village was $42,250, and the median income for a family was $43,500. Males had a median income of $34,688 versus $25,469 for females. The per capita income for the village was $13,995. About 5.6% of families and 7.5% of the population were below the poverty line, including 5.7% of those under age 18 and 12.1% of those age 65 or over.
