= Fallsbury Township, Ohio =

Township in Ohio, US

Fallsbury Township, Licking County, Ohio
- Township
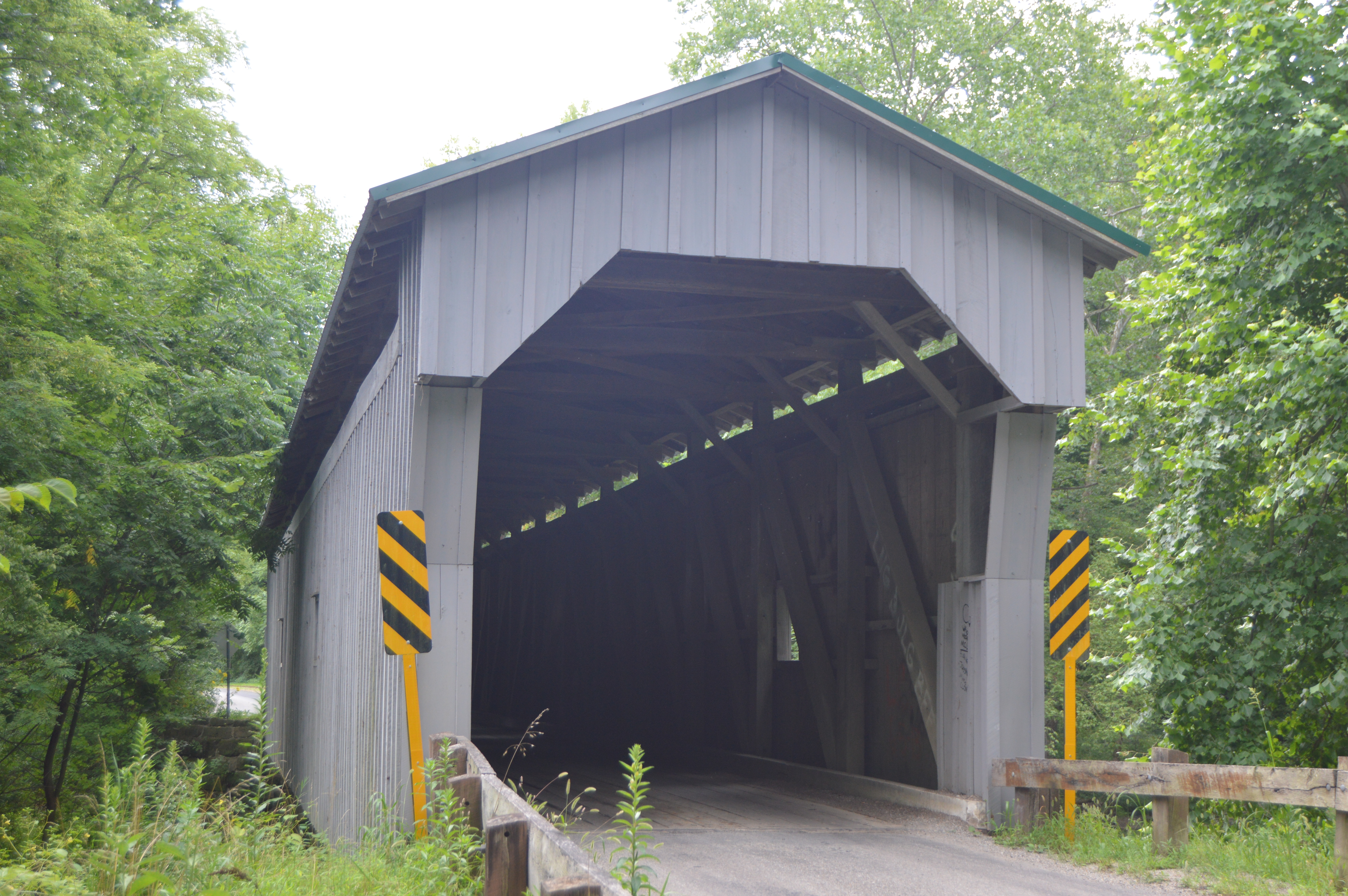
- Gregg Mill Covered Bridge

- Location in Licking County
- Coordinates: 40°12′14″N 82°13′2″W
- Country: United States
- State: Ohio
- County: Licking

Area
  - Total: 24.9 sq mi (64.4 km^{2})
  - Land: 24.8 sq mi (64.3 km^{2})
  - Water: 0.039 sq mi (0.1 km^{2})
- Elevation: 1,020 ft (310 m)

Population (2020)
  - Total: 985
  - Density: 39.7/sq mi (15.3/km^{2})
- Time zone: UTC-5 (Eastern (EST))
  - Summer (DST): UTC-4 (EDT)
- FIPS code: 39-26530
- GNIS feature ID: 1086457

Fallsbury Township is one of the 25 townships of Licking County, Ohio, United States. As of the 2020 census the population was 985.

== Geography ==
Located in the northeastern corner of the county, it borders the following townships:

- Jackson Township, Knox County - north
- Perry Township, Coshocton County - northeast
- Pike Township, Coshocton County - east
- Perry Township - south
- Mary Ann Township - southwest corner
- Eden Township - west
- Clay Township, Knox County - northwest corner

No municipalities are located in Fallsbury Township.

== Name and history ==
It is the only Fallsbury Township statewide.

== Government ==
The township is governed by a three-member board of trustees, who are elected in November of odd-numbered years to a four-year term beginning on the following January 1. Two are elected in the year after the presidential election and one is elected in the year before it. There is also an elected township fiscal officer, who serves a four-year term beginning on April 1 of the year after the election, which is held in November of the year before the presidential election. Vacancies in the fiscal officership or on the board of trustees are filled by the remaining trustees.
