= Hanover Township, Licking County, Ohio =

Township in Ohio, US

- Township
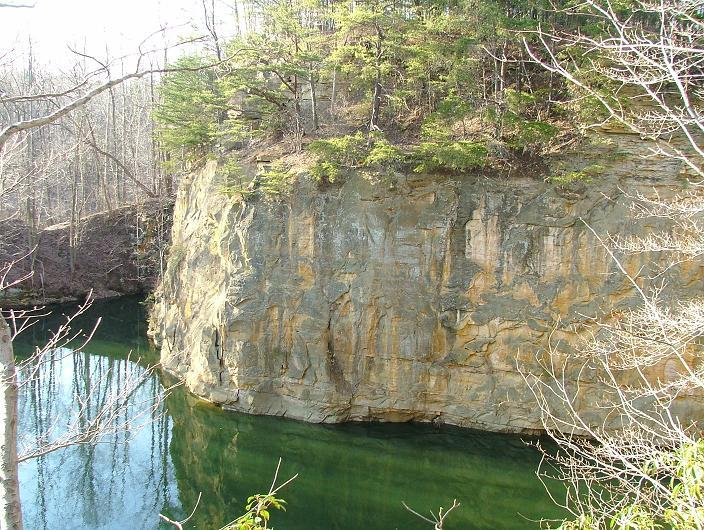
- Blackhand Gorge State Nature Preserve

- Location within Licking County
- Coordinates: 40°3′47″N 82°14′7″W
- Country: United States
- State: Ohio
- County: Licking

Area
  - Total: 25.2 sq mi (65.3 km^{2})
  - Land: 24.8 sq mi (64.2 km^{2})
  - Water: 0.42 sq mi (1.1 km^{2})
- Elevation: 974 ft (297 m)

Population (2020)
  - Total: 3,036
  - Density: 122/sq mi (47.3/km^{2})
- Time zone: UTC-5 (Eastern (EST))
  - Summer (DST): UTC-4 (EDT)
- FIPS code: 39-33299
- GNIS feature ID: 1086460
- Website: https://hanovertownshipohio.net/

Hanover Township is one of the 25 townships of Licking County, Ohio, United States. As of the 2020 census the population was 3,036.

== Geography ==
Located on the eastern edge of the county, it borders the following townships:

- Perry Township - north
- Jackson Township, Muskingum County - northeast corner
- Licking Township, Muskingum County - east
- Hopewell Township, Muskingum County - southeast corner
- Hopewell Township - south
- Franklin Township - southwest corner
- Madison Township - west

The village of Hanover is located in northwestern Hanover Township.

== Name and history ==
Statewide, other Hanover Townships are located in Butler, Ashland, and Columbiana counties.

== Government ==
The township is governed by a three-member board of trustees, who are elected in November of odd-numbered years to a four-year term beginning on the following January 1. Two are elected in the year after the presidential election and one is elected in the year before it. There is also an elected township fiscal officer, who serves a four-year term beginning on April 1 of the year after the election, which is held in November of the year before the presidential election. Vacancies in the fiscal officership or on the board of trustees are filled by the remaining trustees.
