= Scenic Scioto Heritage Trail =

Scenic byway in Scioto County, Ohio

- Scenic Scioto Heritage Trail highlighted in red

Route information
- Maintained by ODOT
- Length: 85 mi (137 km)

Location
- Country: United States
- State: Ohio
- Counties: Scioto

Highway system
- Ohio State Highway System; Interstate; US; State; Scenic

The Scenic Scioto Heritage Trail is a scenic byway located in Scioto County, Ohio, that has been recognized by the Ohio Department of Transportation (ODOT) Scenic Byway Program as one of the state’s scenic byways having met the required criteria of having outstanding scenic, natural, historic, archeological, cultural or recreational qualities.

As of 2011 there were 44 points of interest and historical landmarks along the nearly 85 miles (137 km) of federal, state, county and township highways that make up the Scenic Scioto Heritage Trail.

The purpose of the Scenic Scioto Heritage Trail is to advance tourism, promote the awareness and understanding of the area’s rich heritage and to identify and protect the scenic, historical and cultural assets of the area.

== Route description ==
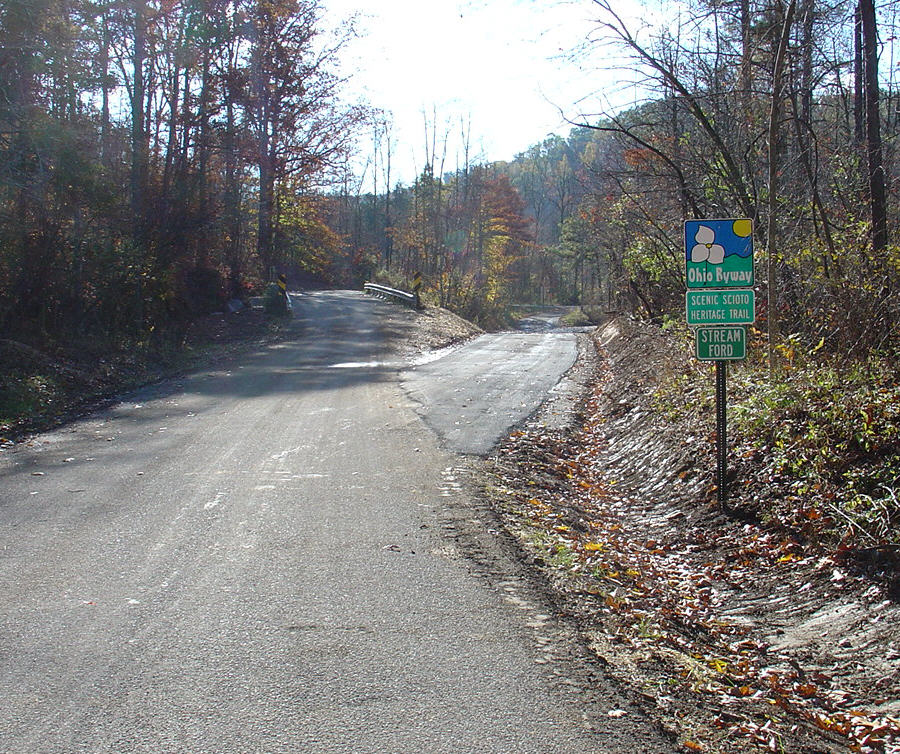
A stream ford located in Shawnee State Forest along the Scenic Scioto Heritage Trail

The Scenic Scioto Heritage Trail begins at the Scioto County Welcome Center at 342 Second Street in downtown Portsmouth, Ohio where it ties into the Ohio River Byway.

The Scenic Scioto Heritage Trail leaves Portsmouth heading west and north following Ohio State Route 73 and Ohio State Route 104. In West Portsmouth the Scenic Scioto Heritage Trail turns west onto Ohio State Route 239 and then travels south a short distance on Ohio State Route 239 until it merges with US Route 52.

The Scenic Scioto Heritage Trail then follows US Route 52 and the Ohio River.

Near Friendship, Ohio travelers have the choice to continue west on US Route 52 or turn northwest onto Ohio State Route 125 and into Shawnee State Forest.

For those who choose to continue west on US Route 52 the Scenic Scioto Heritage Trail continues along the Ohio River to Scioto County Road 96. The Scenic Scioto Heritage Trail then continues north along Scioto County Road 96 until it intersects with Ohio State Route 125.

The Scenic Scioto Heritage Trail then proceeds north onto Scioto County Road 40 until it intersects Ohio State Route 348.

Once again travelers have the choice of traveling west on Ohio State Route 348 or east.

For those who travel west the Scenic Scioto Heritage Trail intersects Scioto County Road 39 and travels north to Rarden, Ohio.

The Scenic Scioto Heritage Trail intersects Ohio State Route 73 at Rarden, Ohio and travels north where it intersects Scioto County Road 37.

The Scenic Scioto Heritage Trail then continues north on Scioto County Road 37 until it intersects Ohio State Route 772.

The Scenic Scioto Heritage Trail then continues south along Ohio State Route 772 until it intersects with Scioto County Road 32.

Following Scioto County Road 32 the Scenic Scioto Heritage Trail travels east until it intersects Scioto County Road 35.

Once on Scioto County Road 35 the Scenic Scioto Heritage Trail travels south until it intersects Ohio State Route 348.

For those who choose to travel east on Ohio State Route 348 the Scenic Scioto Heritage Trail travels to Otway, Ohio where it intersects Ohio State Route 73.

Travelers then have the choice of going northwest on Ohio State Route 348 and Ohio State Route 73 or to travel southeast on Ohio State Route 73.

For those who choose to travel southeast on Ohio State Route 73 the Scenic Scioto Heritage Trail continues until it intersects Scioto County Road 46 and the northern leg of the Scenic Scioto Heritage Trail.

For those who choose to travel northwest on Ohio State Route 348 and Ohio State Route 73 at Otway, Ohio the Scenic Scioto Heritage Trail proceeds northwest along Ohio State Route 348 and Ohio State Route 73 until it turns northeast and then follows Ohio State Route 348 until it intersects Scioto County Road 35 and the northern loop of the Scenic Scioto Heritage Trail.

The Scenic Scioto Heritage Trail then proceeds south along Ohio State Route 348 until it reaches the intersection with Scioto County Road 524 where it follows Scioto County Road 524 and proceeds southeast until it reaches Ohio State Route 348 again.

Proceeding east a short distance on Ohio State Route 348 the Scenic Scioto Heritage Trail then turns onto Rush Township Highway 140 and proceeds southeast again until it intersects with Scioto County Road 33.

The Scenic Scioto Heritage Trail then continues along Scioto County Road 33 until it intersects Scioto County Road 46.

Turning west on Scioto County Road 46 the Scenic Scioto Heritage Trail continues west on Scioto County Road 46 turning south toward McDermott, Ohio.

Continuing on Scioto County Road 46 through McDermott, Ohio the Scenic Scioto Heritage Trail continues until it intersects Ohio State Route 73 and the joins the portion of the Scenic Scioto Heritage Trail running along Ohio State Route 73 from Otway, Ohio.

The Scenic Scioto Heritage Trail then follows Ohio State Route 73 a short distance east to the intersection with Scioto County Road 49.

Traveling south along Scioto County Road 49 the Scenic Scioto Heritage Trail continues for several miles until it reaches US Route 52 again at West Portsmouth, Ohio.

== History ==
The Scenic Scioto Heritage Trail grew out of a vision of former Scioto County, Ohio Engineer Clyde S. Willis who along with the Scioto County Commissioners sponsored the development of a corridor management plan prepared by Mary Ellen Kimberlin, LLC in conjunction with the Scenic Scioto County Byway Advisory Committee in 2006.

The corridor management plan also received supporting resolutions from the City of Portsmouth, the Village of Rarden, the Village of Otway, Brush Creek Township, Morgan Township, Nile Township, Rarden Township, Rush Township, Union Township and Washington Township.

Following a number of public hearings to solicit input from the citizens of Scioto County the Scenic Scioto Heritage Trail Corridor Management Plan was submitted to the Ohio Department of Transportation.

The Scenic Scioto Heritage Trail was officially accepted as Ohio's 23rd state scenic byway by the Ohio Department of Transportation on February 7, 2007.

== Points of interest ==
There are a total of 44 points of interest and historic landmarks along the Scenic Scioto Heritage Trail as of 2011. Some of the points of interest include scenic views of the Ohio River, the natural beauty of Shawnee State Park and Forest, earthworks constructed by the ancient Hopewell Indians, the Kalanu Native American Cemetery, the Phillip Moore Stone House constructed in 1797, the Otway Covered Bridge built in 1874 and Scioto County’s last remaining covered bridge, remnants the Ohio and Erie Canal, Ohio’s largest Yellow buckeye tree and the boyhood homes of cowboy movie star Roy Rogers and Major League Baseball Hall of Fame member Branch Rickey.

== See also ==
- National Scenic Byway
