= Ohio State Route 728 =

State highway in Scioto County, Ohio, US

State Route 728

Route information
- Maintained by ODOT
- Length: 1.93 mi (3.11 km)
- Existed: 1975–present

Major junctions
- West end: US 23 in Lucasville
- East end: CR 28 / CR 180 near Lucasville

Location
- Country: United States
- State: Ohio
- Counties: Scioto

Highway system
- Ohio State Highway System; Interstate; US; State; Scenic
← SR 727	→ SR 729

State Route 728 (SR 728) is a short east–west state highway situated in south-central Ohio. At a length of just under 2 miles (3.2 km), the state highway is a spur route that provides access to the Southern Ohio Correctional Facility. The western terminus of SR 728 is at a signalized intersection with U.S. Route 23 (US 23) in Lucasville that doubles as the eastern terminus of SR 348. Its eastern terminus is just east of the Southern Ohio Correctional Facility, at the intersection of Lucasville-Minford Road (Scioto County Road 28 or CR 28) and Lang Lane (CR 180).

== Route description ==
The short trek of SR 728 begins at a signalized intersection with US 23 in the unincorporated community of Lucasville that also marks SR 348's eastern terminus. Immediately east of the intersection, SR 728 passes beneath the Norfolk Southern railroad tracks that run parallel to US 23 through this area, then proceeds by its intersection with Fairground Road into Scioto County's Valley Township. After passing some commercial businesses, the highway bends to the southeast, bordering woods on both sides of the roadway in the process. Departing the woods, SR 728 passes a T-intersection with Robert Lucas Road, then bends to the east, with an open field appearing on the south side of the highway, and a residential subdivision on the north side. Following intersections with two side streets, SR 728 passes by Valley Middle School. Curving to the east-southeast, the state highway is again abutted by a residential subdivision to the north, as it intersects another two side streets. After meeting that second side street, SR 728 then passes the Southern Ohio Correctional Facility, which is located on the south side of the highway. East of the entrance to the correctional facility, on the north side of the highway is the access drive for Valley High School. Upon crossing into Jefferson Township, SR 728 arrives at its endpoint where it meets Lang Lane (CR 180). Heading east from here is about 400 feet (120 m) of state-maintained roadway before transitioning to the county-maintained Lucasville-Minford Road (CR 28).

SR 728 is not included as a part of the National Highway System.

== History ==
SR 728 was designated in 1975 to connect the Southern Ohio Correctional Facility to the rest of the Ohio state highway system. The spur highway has not undergone any significant changes since its inception.

== Major intersections ==
The entire route is in Scioto County.

Location	mi	km	Destinations	Notes
Valley Township	0.00	0.00	US 23 / SR 348 west – Portsmouth, Piketon, Otway	Eastern terminus of SR 348
Jefferson Township	1.93	3.11	CR 28 (Lucasville-Minford Road) / CR 180 (Lang Lane)	
1.000 mi = 1.609 km; 1.000 km = 0.621 mi
