= Valley Township, Ohio =

Valley Township, Ohio may refer to:

- Valley Township, Guernsey County, Ohio
- Valley Township, Scioto County, Ohio
