= Ohio State Route 240 =

State Route 240

Route information
- Maintained by ODOT

Location
- Country: United States
- State: Ohio

Highway system
- Ohio State Highway System; Interstate; US; State; Scenic
← SR 239	→ SR 241

In Ohio, State Route 240 may refer to:

- Ohio State Route 240 (1920s-1930s), now part of SR 348
- Ohio State Route 240 (1940s-1960s), now part of SR 269
