= West Portsmouth =

West Portsmouth may refer to:

- Portsmouth West (UK Parliament constituency)
- West Portsmouth, Ohio
