= Beaver Township, Ohio =

Beaver Township, Ohio, may refer to:

- Beaver Township, Mahoning County, Ohio
- Beaver Township, Noble County, Ohio
- Beaver Township, Pike County, Ohio
