= Camp Creek Township, Ohio =

Township in Ohio, US

Camp Creek Township, Pike County, Ohio
- Township
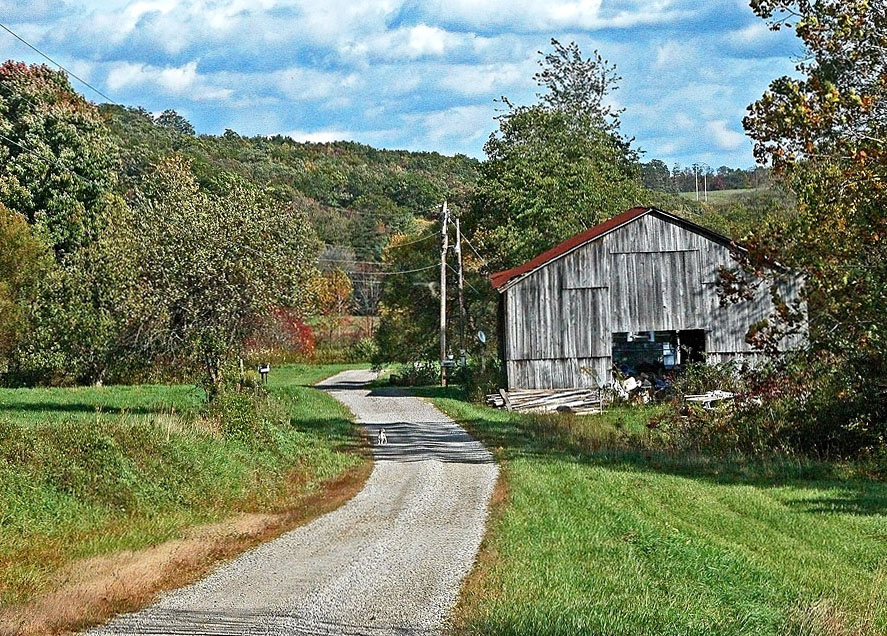
- Vanaka Bank Road west of Camp

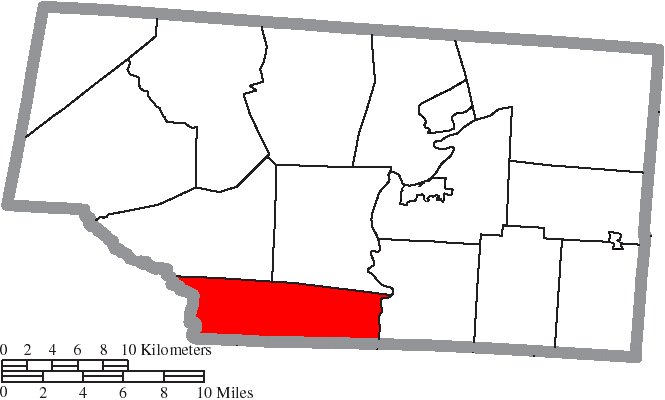
- Location of Camp Creek Township in Pike County
- Coordinates: 38°58′46″N 83°8′7″W
- Country: United States
- State: Ohio
- County: Pike

Area
  - Total: 27.4 sq mi (71.0 km^{2})
  - Land: 27.3 sq mi (70.8 km^{2})
  - Water: 0.12 sq mi (0.3 km^{2})
- Elevation: 771 ft (235 m)

Population (2020)
  - Total: 1,057
  - Density: 39/sq mi (14.9/km^{2})
- Time zone: UTC-5 (Eastern (EST))
  - Summer (DST): UTC-4 (EDT)
- FIPS code: 39-11122
- GNIS feature ID: 1086809

Camp Creek Township is one of the fourteen townships of Pike County, Ohio, United States. The 2020 census found 1,057 people in the township.

== Geography ==
Located in the southern part of the county, it borders the following townships:

- Newton Township - northeast
- Scioto Township - east
- Valley Township, Scioto County - southeast corner
- Morgan Township, Scioto County - south
- Rarden Township, Scioto County - southwest
- Sunfish Township - northwest

No municipalities are located in Camp Creek Township.

== Name and history ==
Named for a stream of the same name within its borders, it is the only Camp Creek Township statewide.

== Government ==
The township is governed by a three-member board of trustees, who are elected in November of odd-numbered years to a four-year term beginning on the following January 1. Two are elected in the year after the presidential election and one is elected in the year before it. There is also an elected township fiscal officer, who serves a four-year term beginning on April 1 of the year after the election, which is held in November of the year before the presidential election. Vacancies in the fiscal officership or on the board of trustees are filled by the remaining trustees.
