= Marion Township, Pike County, Ohio =

Township in Ohio, US

- Township
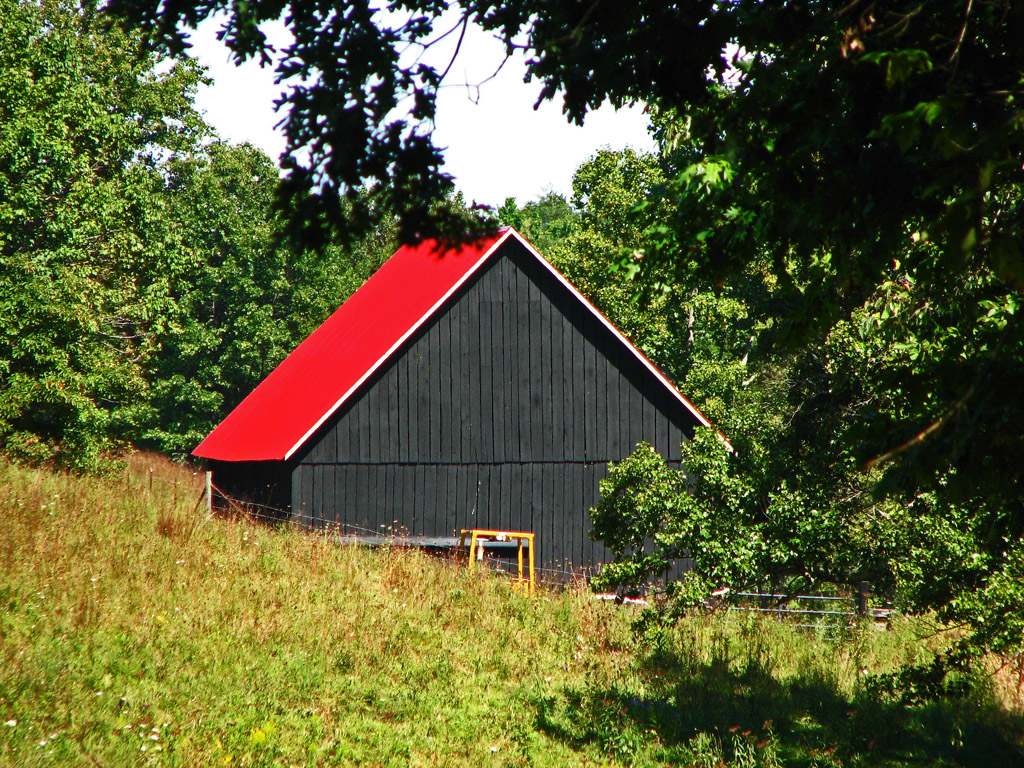
- A barn in the township

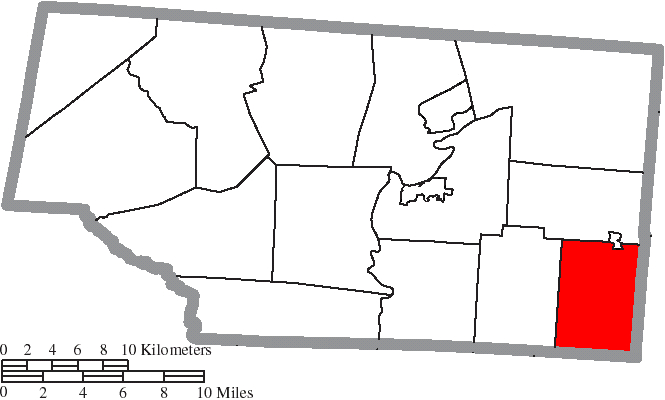
- Location of Marion Township in Pike County
- Coordinates: 38°59′48″N 82°50′27″W
- Country: United States
- State: Ohio
- County: Pike

Area
  - Total: 22.6 sq mi (58.6 km^{2})
  - Land: 22.6 sq mi (58.6 km^{2})
  - Water: 0 sq mi (0.0 km^{2})
- Elevation: 892 ft (272 m)

Population (2020)
  - Total: 1,478
  - Density: 65.3/sq mi (25.2/km^{2})
- Time zone: UTC-5 (Eastern (EST))
  - Summer (DST): UTC-4 (EDT)
- FIPS code: 39-47824
- GNIS feature ID: 1086811

Marion Township is one of the fourteen townships of Pike County, Ohio, United States. The 2020 census found 1,478 people in the township.

== Geography ==
Located in the southeastern corner of the county, it borders the following townships:

- Beaver Township - north
- Scioto Township, Jackson County - east
- Madison Township, Scioto County - south
- Union Township - west

Part of the village of Beaver is located in northern Marion Township, and the census-designated place of Stockdale lies in the southern part of the township.

== Name and history ==
It is one of twelve Marion Townships statewide.

== Government ==
The township is governed by a three-member board of trustees, who are elected in November of odd-numbered years to a four-year term beginning on the following January 1. Two are elected in the year after the presidential election and one is elected in the year before it. There is also an elected township fiscal officer, who serves a four-year term beginning on April 1 of the year after the election, which is held in November of the year before the presidential election. Vacancies in the fiscal officership or on the board of trustees are filled by the remaining trustees.
