= Scioto Township, Pike County, Ohio =

Township in Ohio, US

- Township
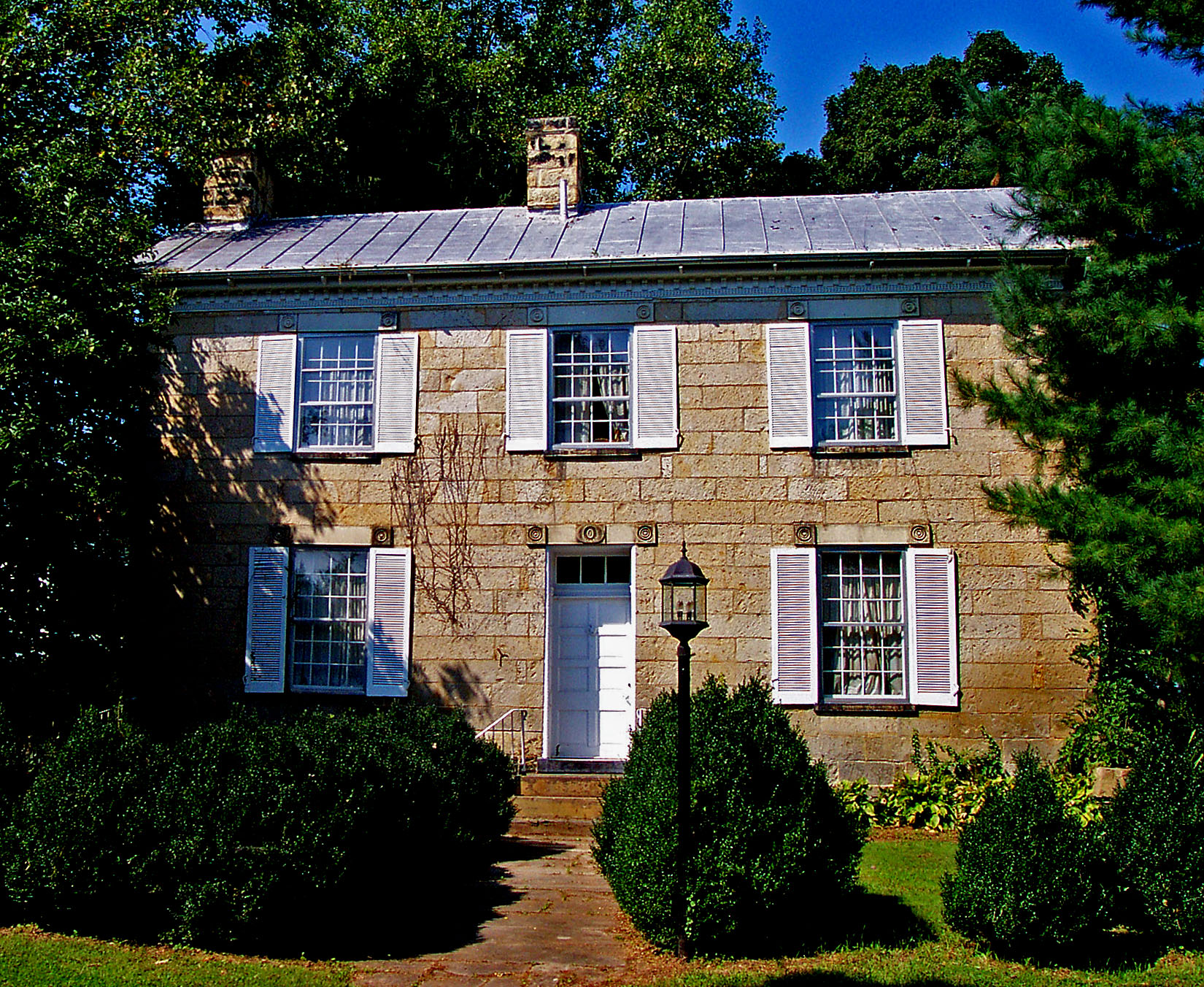
- The Vanmeter Stone House, a historic site in the township

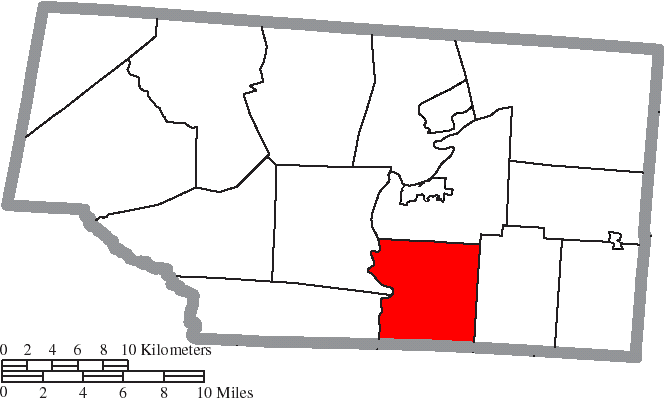
- Location of Scioto Township in Pike County
- Coordinates: 39°0′35″N 83°0′1″W
- Country: United States
- State: Ohio
- County: Pike

Area
  - Total: 24.9 sq mi (64.6 km^{2})
  - Land: 24.6 sq mi (63.6 km^{2})
  - Water: 0.39 sq mi (1.0 km^{2})
- Elevation: 692 ft (211 m)

Population (2020)
  - Total: 1,061
  - Density: 43/sq mi (16.7/km^{2})
- Time zone: UTC-5 (Eastern (EST))
  - Summer (DST): UTC-4 (EDT)
- FIPS code: 39-70884
- GNIS feature ID: 1086817
- Website: http://www.sciototwppike.com/

Scioto Township is one of the fourteen townships of Pike County, Ohio, United States. The 2020 census found 1,061 people in the township.

== Geography ==
Located in the southern part of the county, it borders the following townships:

- Seal Township - north
- Union Township - east
- Jefferson Township, Scioto County - southeast corner
- Valley Township, Scioto County - south
- Morgan Township, Scioto County - southwest corner
- Camp Creek Township - west
- Newton Township - northwest

No municipalities are located in Scioto Township, although the unincorporated community of Wakefield lies in the southwestern part of the township.

== Name and history ==
It is one of five Scioto Townships statewide.

== Government ==
The township is governed by a three-member board of trustees, who are elected in November of odd-numbered years to a four-year term beginning on the following January 1. Two are elected in the year after the presidential election and one is elected in the year before it. There is also an elected township fiscal officer, who serves a four-year term beginning on April 1 of the year after the election, which is held in November of the year before the presidential election. Vacancies in the fiscal officership or on the board of trustees are filled by the remaining trustees.
