= Jasper, Ohio =

Unincorporated community in Ohio, U.S.

Coordinates: 39°03′00″N 83°03′24″W

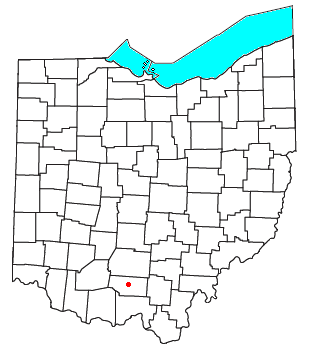
Location of Jasper, Ohio

Jasper is an unincorporated community in eastern Newton Township, Pike County, Ohio, United States. It has a post office with the ZIP code 45642. It lies at the intersection of State Routes 32, 104, and 124 along the banks of the Scioto River.

== History ==
Jasper was platted by Robert Lucas on the Ohio and Erie Canal.

== Education ==
Scioto Valley Local School District operates Jasper Elementary School in the community.

== Gallery ==
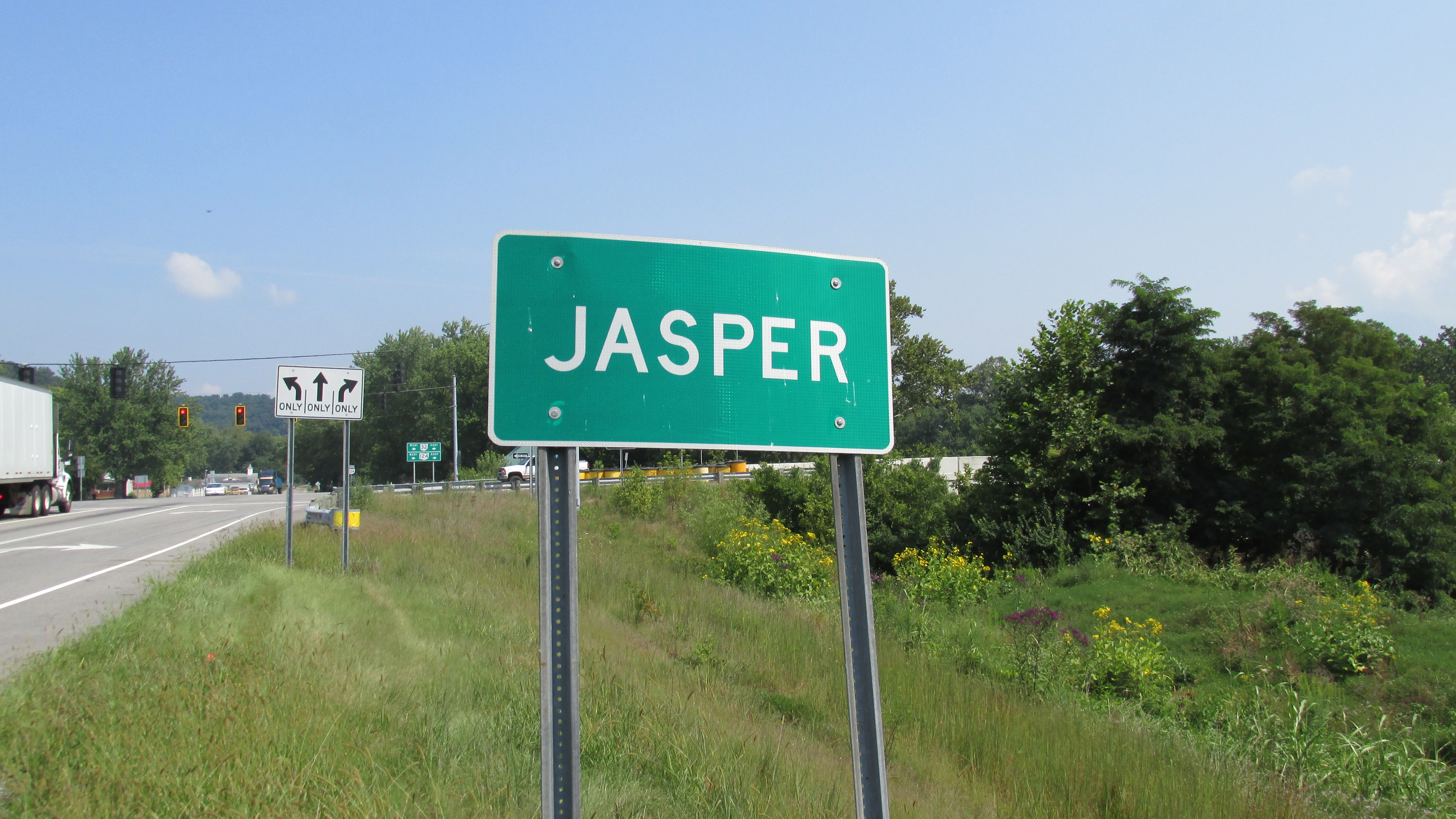
Jasper community sign

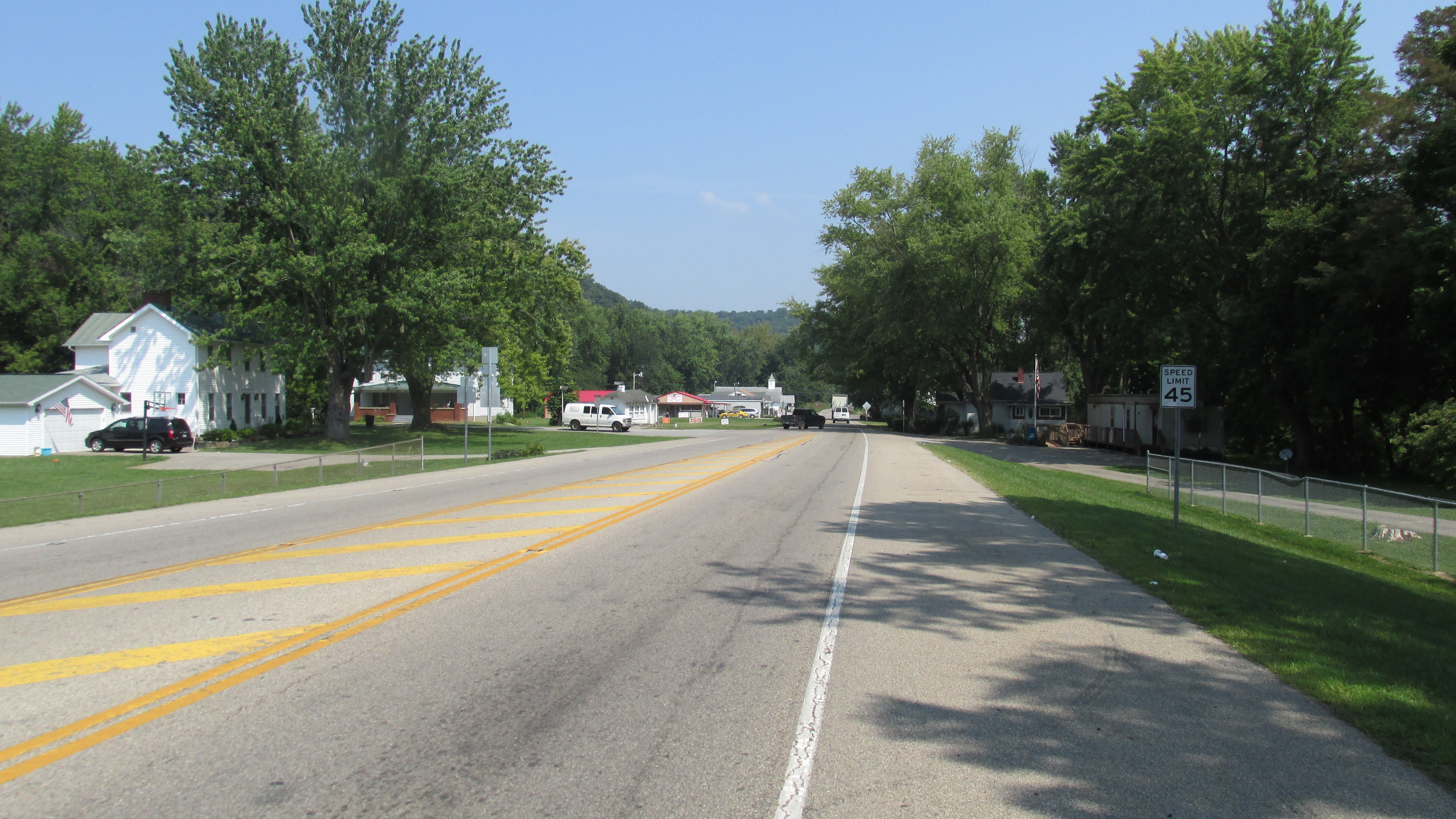
Looking north on Ohio Highway 104 in Jasper

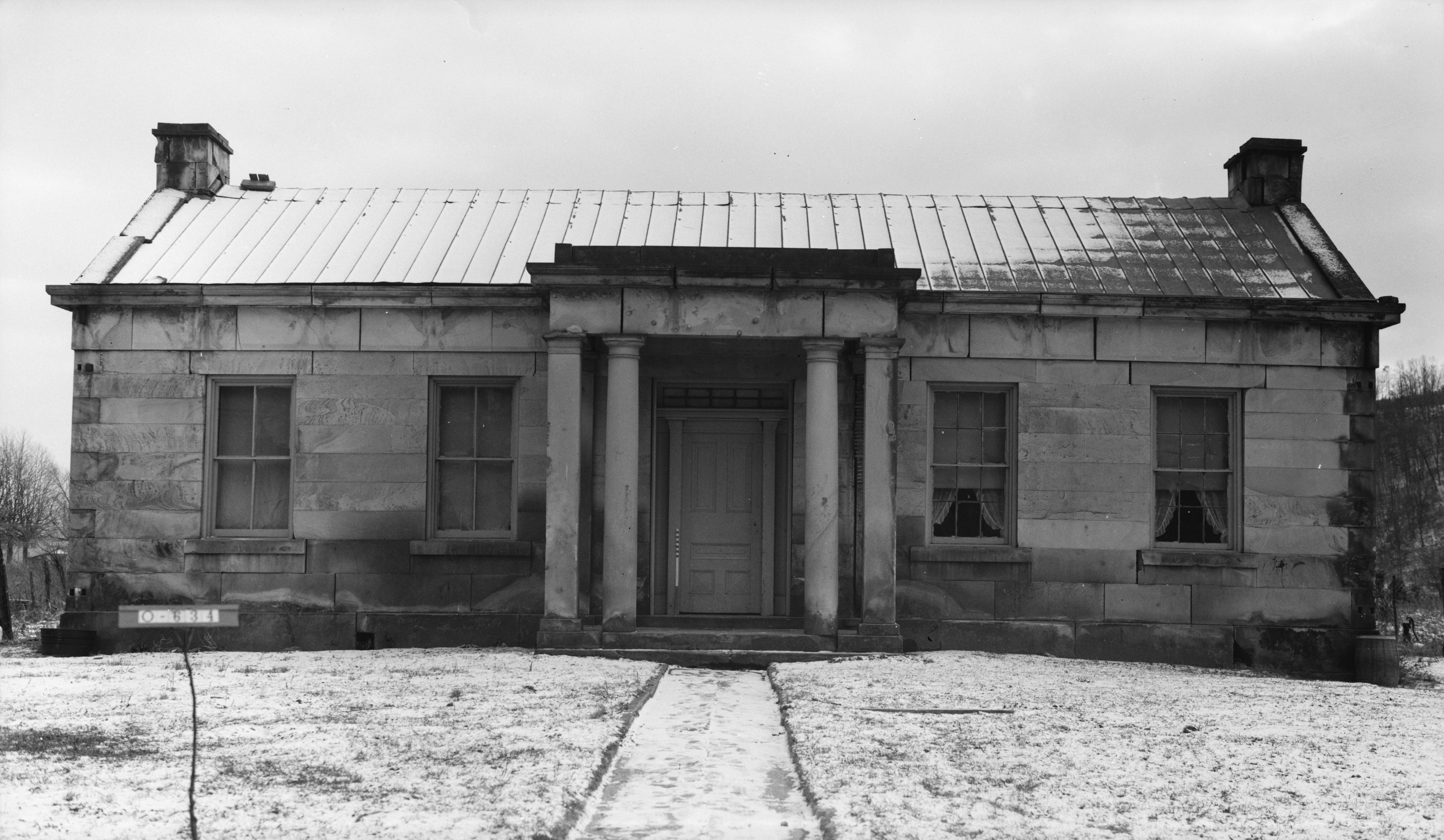
The Jones-Cutler House, a Jasper landmark
