= Madison Township, Scioto County, Ohio =

Township in Ohio, US

- Township
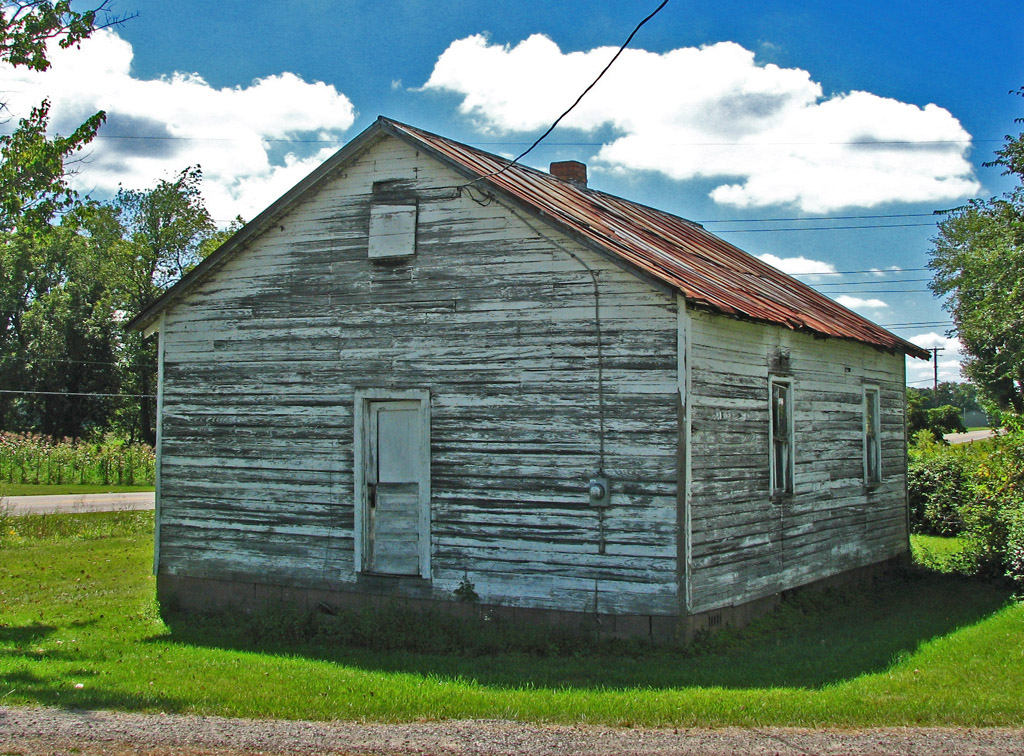
- Former schoolhouse on the township's northern edge

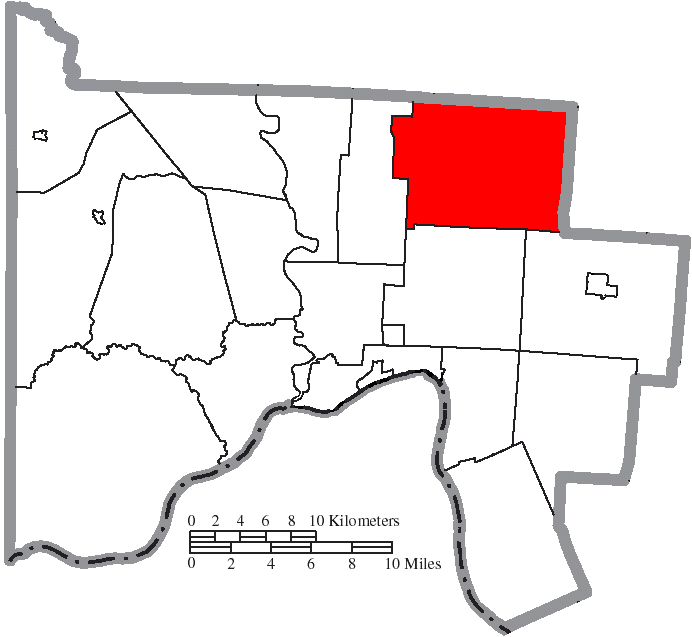
- Location of Madison Township in Scioto County
- Coordinates: 38°53′57″N 82°51′11″W
- Country: United States
- State: Ohio
- County: Scioto

Area
  - Total: 52.0 sq mi (134.6 km^{2})
  - Land: 52.0 sq mi (134.6 km^{2})
  - Water: 0 sq mi (0.0 km^{2})
- Elevation: 748 ft (228 m)

Population (2020)
  - Total: 3,887
  - Density: 74.79/sq mi (28.88/km^{2})
- Time zone: UTC-5 (Eastern (EST))
  - Summer (DST): UTC-4 (EDT)
- FIPS code: 39-46606
- GNIS feature ID: 1086928

Madison Township is one of the sixteen townships of Scioto County, Ohio, United States. The 2020 census counted 3,887 people in the township.

== Geography ==
Located in the northeastern corner of the county, it borders the following townships:

- Marion Township, Pike County - north
- Scioto Township, Jackson County - northeast
- Hamilton Township, Jackson County - east
- Union Township, Pike County - northwest
- Bloom Township - southeast
- Harrison Township - south
- Jefferson Township - west

No municipalities are located in Madison Township, although the unincorporated communities of Minford and Mule Town lie along the border with Harrison Township and in the township's southwest respectively.

== Name and history ==
Named after James Madison, the fourth President of the United States, it is one of twenty Madison Townships statewide.

Madison Township was settled as early as 1797 and was organized in 1810.

In 1833, Madison Township had one gristmill propelled by horses, and two tanyards.

== Government ==
The township is governed by a three-member board of trustees, who are elected in November of odd-numbered years to a four-year term beginning on the following January 1. Two are elected in the year after the presidential election and one is elected in the year before it. There is also an elected township fiscal officer, who serves a four-year term beginning on April 1 of the year after the election, which is held in November of the year before the presidential election. Vacancies in the fiscal officership or on the board of trustees are filled by the remaining trustees.
