= Stockdale, Ohio =

- CDP
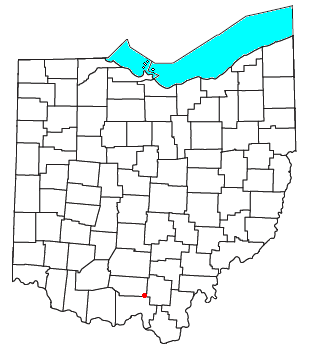
- Location of Stockdale, Ohio
- Country: United States
- State: Ohio
- County: Pike
- Township: Marion
- Elevation: 781 ft (238 m)

Population (2020)
  - Total: 111
- Time zone: UTC-5 (Eastern (EST))
  - Summer (DST): UTC-4 (EDT)
- ZIP: 45683
- GNIS feature ID: 2628973

Stockdale is an unincorporated community and census-designated place in southern Marion Township, Pike County, Ohio, United States. As of the 2020 census, Stockdale had a population of 111. Stockdale has a post office with the ZIP code 45683. Stockdale is served by the Minford Telephone Company and Eastern Local Schools.

== Notable people ==
- Zach Veach, auto racing driver

== Gallery ==
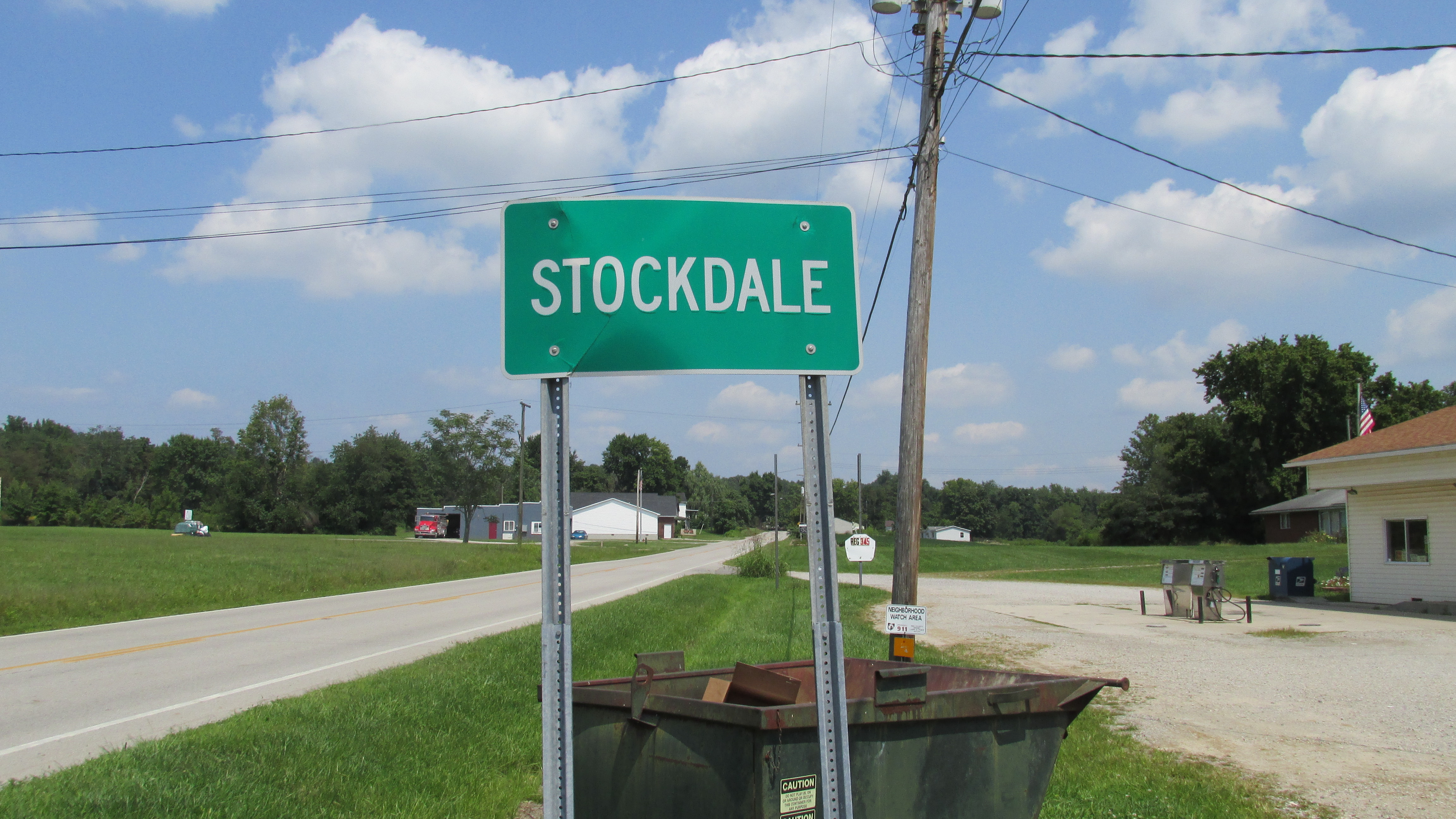
Stockdale community sign.

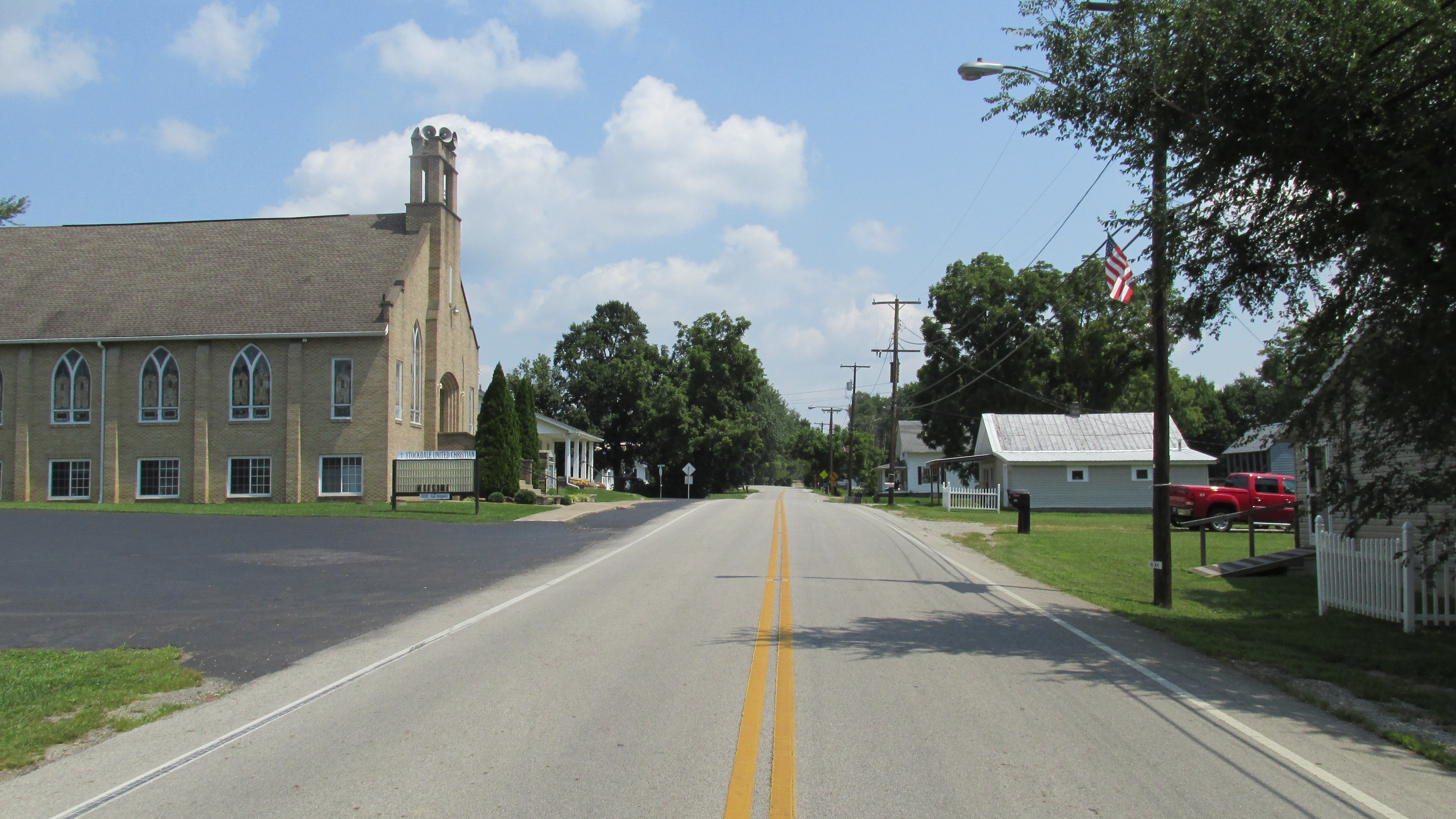
Looking east on Ohio Highway 335 in Stockdale.
