= Newton Township, Pike County, Ohio =

Township in Ohio, US

- Township
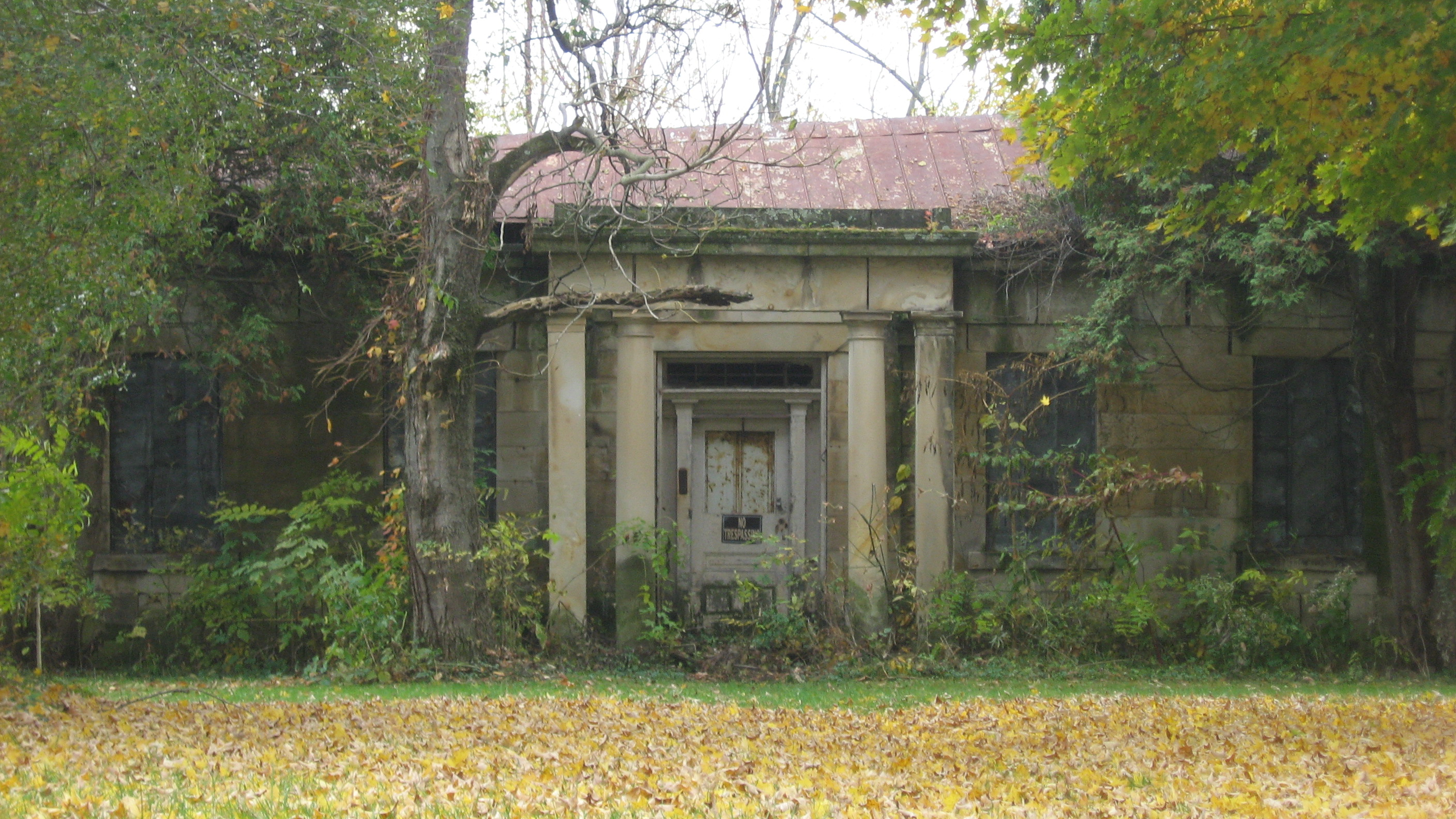
- The Jones-Cutler House in Jasper

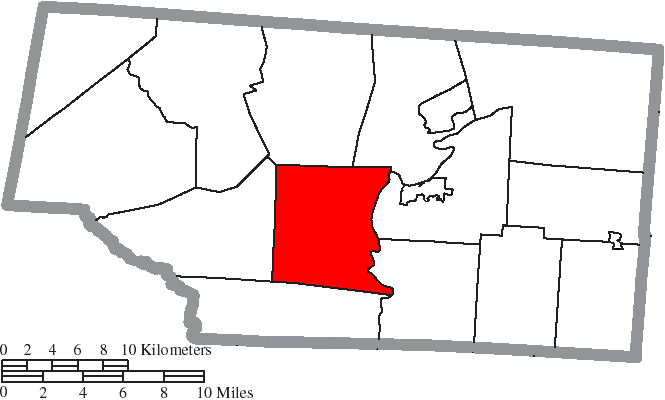
- Location of Newton Township in Pike County
- Coordinates: 39°2′52″N 83°5′16″W
- Country: United States
- State: Ohio
- County: Pike

Area
  - Total: 30.8 sq mi (79.8 km^{2})
  - Land: 30.6 sq mi (79.2 km^{2})
  - Water: 0.23 sq mi (0.6 km^{2})
- Elevation: 801 ft (244 m)

Population (2020)
  - Total: 1,810
  - Density: 59/sq mi (22.9/km^{2})
- Time zone: UTC-5 (Eastern (EST))
  - Summer (DST): UTC-4 (EDT)
- FIPS code: 39-55622
- GNIS feature ID: 1086813

Newton Township is one of the fourteen townships of Pike County, Ohio, United States. The 2020 census found 1,810 people in the township.

== Geography ==
Located in the central part of the county, it borders the following townships:

- Pebble Township - north
- Pee Pee Township - northeast
- Seal Township - east
- Scioto Township - southeast
- Camp Creek Township - south
- Sunfish Township - west

Along with Seal Township, it is the only Pike County township completely surrounded by other Pike County townships. The other twelve all touch townships from neighboring counties.

No municipalities are located in Newton Township, although the unincorporated community of Jasper lies in the eastern part of the township.

== Name and history ==
It is one of five Newton Townships statewide.

== Government ==
The township is governed by a three-member board of trustees, who are elected in November of odd-numbered years to a four-year term beginning on the following January 1. Two are elected in the year after the presidential election and one is elected in the year before it. There is also an elected township fiscal officer, who serves a four-year term beginning on April 1 of the year after the election, which is held in November of the year before the presidential election. Vacancies in the fiscal officership or on the board of trustees are filled by the remaining trustees.
