= Jackson Township, Pike County, Ohio =

Township in Ohio, US

- Township
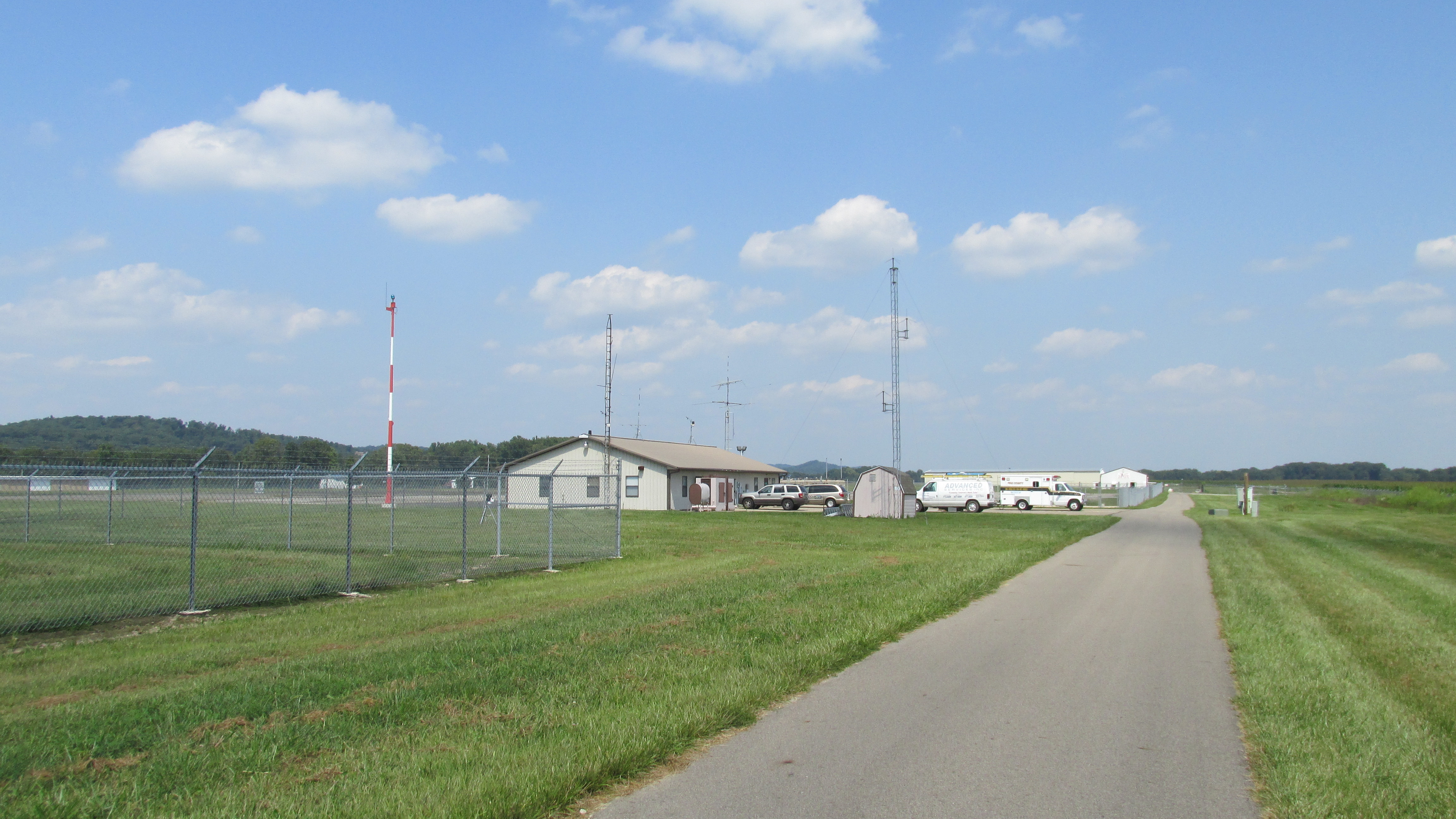
- Pike County Airport

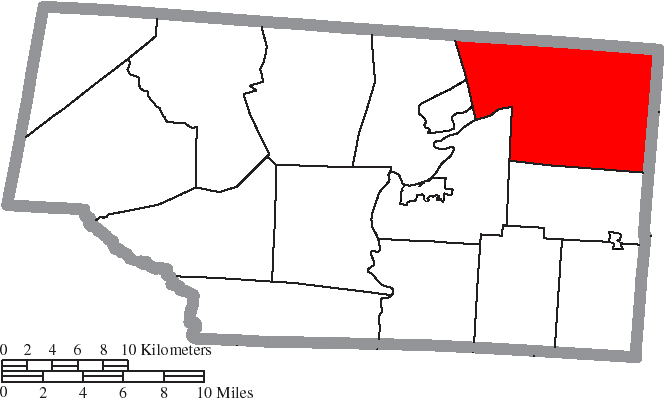
- Location of Jackson Township in Pike County
- Coordinates: 39°8′5″N 82°52′59″W
- Country: United States
- State: Ohio
- County: Pike

Area
  - Total: 52.0 sq mi (134.8 km^{2})
  - Land: 51.5 sq mi (133.3 km^{2})
  - Water: 0.54 sq mi (1.4 km^{2})
- Elevation: 692 ft (211 m)

Population (2020)
  - Total: 1,170
  - Density: 23/sq mi (8.8/km^{2})
- Time zone: UTC-5 (Eastern (EST))
  - Summer (DST): UTC-4 (EDT)
- FIPS code: 39-37996
- GNIS feature ID: 1086810

Jackson Township is one of the fourteen townships of Pike County, Ohio, United States. The 2020 census found 1,170 people in the township.

== Geography ==
Located in the northeastern corner of the county, it borders the following townships:

- Jefferson Township, Ross County - north
- Jackson Township, Jackson County - northeast
- Liberty Township, Jackson County - southeast
- Beaver Township - south
- Seal Township - southwest
- Pee Pee Township - west
- Franklin Township, Ross County - northwest

No municipalities are located in Jackson Township.

== Name and history ==
It is one of thirty-seven Jackson Townships statewide.

=== Race relations ===
The eastern part of Jackson Township is unique among American communities due to a large number of white passing mixed-race individuals who choose to identify as African American.

== Government ==
The township is governed by a three-member board of trustees, who are elected in November of odd-numbered years to a four-year term beginning on the following January 1. Two are elected in the year after the presidential election and one is elected in the year before it. There is also an elected township fiscal officer, who serves a four-year term beginning on April 1 of the year after the election, which is held in November of the year before the presidential election. Vacancies in the fiscal officership or on the board of trustees are filled by the remaining trustees.
