= Ohio State Route 349 =

State highway in Ohio, US

State Route 349

Route information
- Maintained by ODOT
- Length: 2.37 mi (3.81 km)
- Existed: 1934–present

Major junctions
- South end: SR 93 in Wellston
- North end: SR 160 in Hamden

Location
- Country: United States
- State: Ohio
- Counties: Jackson, Vinton

Highway system
- Ohio State Highway System; Interstate; US; State; Scenic
← SR 348	→ SR 350

State Route 349 (SR 349) is a north–south state highway in south-central Ohio. SR 349 has its southern terminus is at SR 93 in Wellston. Its northern terminus is at SR 160 in Hamden. Besides providing a shortcut between SR 93 and SR 160 around Hamden, SR 349 allows access to Lake Alma State Park in Vinton County.

== Route description ==
SR 349's starting point is a T-intersection with SR 93 is the northern portion of Wellston. Heading northeast from this intersection, SR 349 is bounded by woods on the south side, while closely being paralleled by the Wellston Bike Path, and passes by a commercial business and a residence on the north side, before forest also fills on that side of the roadway. SR 349 passes intersections with two side streets on the south side of the highway (Mitchell Drive and Amber Drive), and then reaches its intersection with Wellston Park Road. Bending to the north, the state highway departs Wellston as it crosses the boundary from Jackson County into Vinton County. The Wellston Bike Path comes to an end at this point, as well.

Upon crossing the county line, not only does SR 349 enter Clinton Township, but it also enters Lake Alma State Park. At the county line, SR 349 intersects a road that follows the east side of Lake Alma. Heading north from that point, the state highway straddles the western side of the lake. Off the east shoulder of the SR 349 is a pedestrian bridge that links the highway with a small, forested island that is located in the western end of Lake Alma. The road that follows the east side of the lake loops back around to meet the state route just north of the lake, at a point where the highway passes the main entrance into Lake Alma State Park. SR 349 then bends to the northwest briefly, prior to turning to the north-northeast, bounded by heavy woods on both sides of the road. After meeting the village limits of Hamden, SR 349 straddles the eastern boundary of the village, up to the point where it arrives at its endpoint at its junction with SR 160.

SR 349 is not included as a part of the National Highway System.

== History ==
SR 349 was first designated in 1934 along the routing that it currently occupies. When it was created, the highway intersecting SR 349 at its southern terminus was SR 75 instead of SR 93. Other than that, SR 349 has not seen any major changes since its inception.

== Major intersections ==
County	Location	mi	km	Destinations	Notes
Jackson	Wellston	0.00	0.00	SR 93	
Vinton	Hamden	2.37	3.81	SR 160	
1.000 mi = 1.609 km; 1.000 km = 0.621 mi
