= Ohio State Route 348 =

East-west state highway in Ohio, US

State Route 348

Route information
- Maintained by ODOT
- Length: 32.24 mi (51.89 km)
- Existed: 1935–present

Major junctions
- West end: SR 125 near West Union
- East end: US 23 / SR 728 near Lucasville

Location
- Country: United States
- State: Ohio
- Counties: Adams, Scioto

Highway system
- Ohio State Highway System; Interstate; US; State; Scenic
| ← SR 347 | → SR 349 |

State Route 348 (SR 348) is an east–west state highway in the south central portion of the U.S. state of Ohio. Its western terminus is at State Route 125 approximately 6 miles (9.7 km) east of West Union, and its eastern terminus is at U.S. Route 23 just north of Lucasville – this is also the western terminus of State Route 728.

== History ==
SR 348 was commissioned in 1935, routed on its current route, with the eastern terminus at its intersection with SR 73 in Otway. In 1939 the route was extended east to U.S. Route 23, near Lucasville. A section of SR 348 from Otway to Lucasville was originally designated a part of Corridor B on the Appalachian Development Highway System. Only a section from U.S. Route 23 to west of SR 104 was ever completed.

== Major intersections ==
| County | Location | mi | km | Destinations | Notes |
|---|---|---|---|---|---|
| Adams | Tiffin Township | 0.00 | 0.00 | SR 125 | |
| Adams | Jefferson Township | 12.80 | 20.60 | SR 781 west | Eastern terminus of SR 781 |
| Scioto | Otway | 19.78 | 31.83 | SR 73 east | Southern end of SR 73 concurrency |
| Scioto | Otway | 19.93 | 32.07 | SR 73 west | Northern end of SR 73 concurrency |
| Scioto | Morgan Township | 30.97 | 49.84 | SR 104 | |
| Scioto | Valley Township | 32.24 | 51.89 | US 23 / SR 728 east – Portsmouth, Piketon | Western terminus of SR 728 |
1.000 mi = 1.609 km; 1.000 km = 0.621 mi: Concurrency terminus
