= Seal Township, Pike County, Ohio =

Township in Ohio, US

- Township
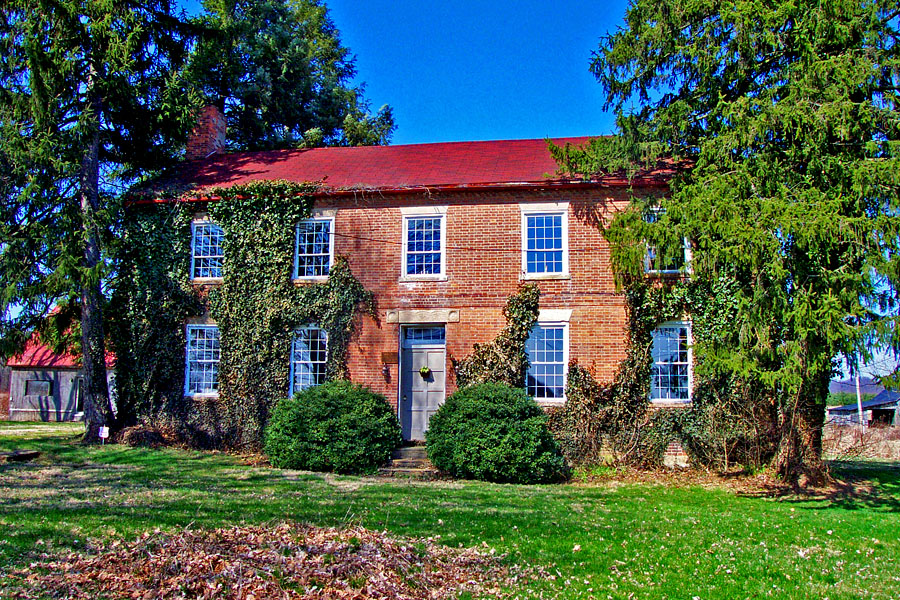
- Friendly Grove, a historic site in the township

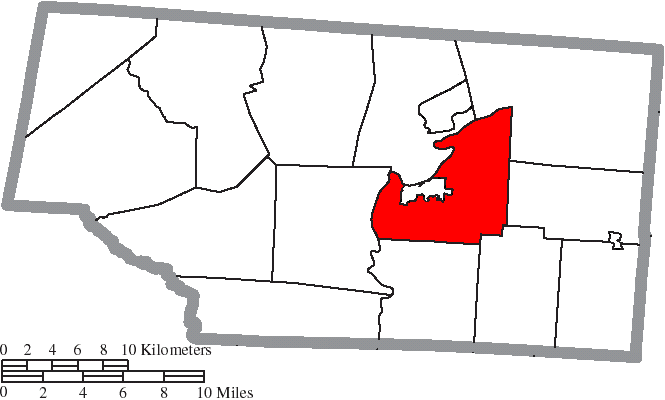
- Location of Seal Township in Pike County
- Coordinates: 39°3′55″N 82°59′43″W
- Country: United States
- State: Ohio
- County: Pike

Area
  - Total: 29.0 sq mi (75.0 km^{2})
  - Land: 28.5 sq mi (73.9 km^{2})
  - Water: 0.42 sq mi (1.1 km^{2})
- Elevation: 686 ft (209 m)

Population (2020)
  - Total: 3,351
  - Density: 117/sq mi (45.3/km^{2})
- Time zone: UTC-5 (Eastern (EST))
  - Summer (DST): UTC-4 (EDT)
- FIPS code: 39-71171
- GNIS feature ID: 1086818

Seal Township is one of the fourteen townships of Pike County, Ohio, United States. The 2020 census found 3,351 people in the township.

== Geography ==
Located in the central part of the county, it borders the following townships:

- Pee Pee Township - north
- Jackson Township - northeast
- Beaver Township - east
- Union Township - southeast
- Scioto Township - south
- Newton Township - west

Along with Newton Township, it is the only Pike County township completely surrounded by other Pike County townships.

The village of Piketon is located in northwestern Seal Township.

== Name and history ==
It is the only Seal Township statewide.

== Government ==
The township is governed by a three-member board of trustees, who are elected in November of odd-numbered years to a four-year term beginning on the following January 1. Two are elected in the year after the presidential election and one is elected in the year before it. There is also an elected township fiscal officer, who serves a four-year term beginning on April 1 of the year after the election, which is held in November of the year before the presidential election. Vacancies in the fiscal officership or on the board of trustees are filled by the remaining trustees.
