= Sunfish Township, Pike County, Ohio =

Township in Ohio, US

- Township
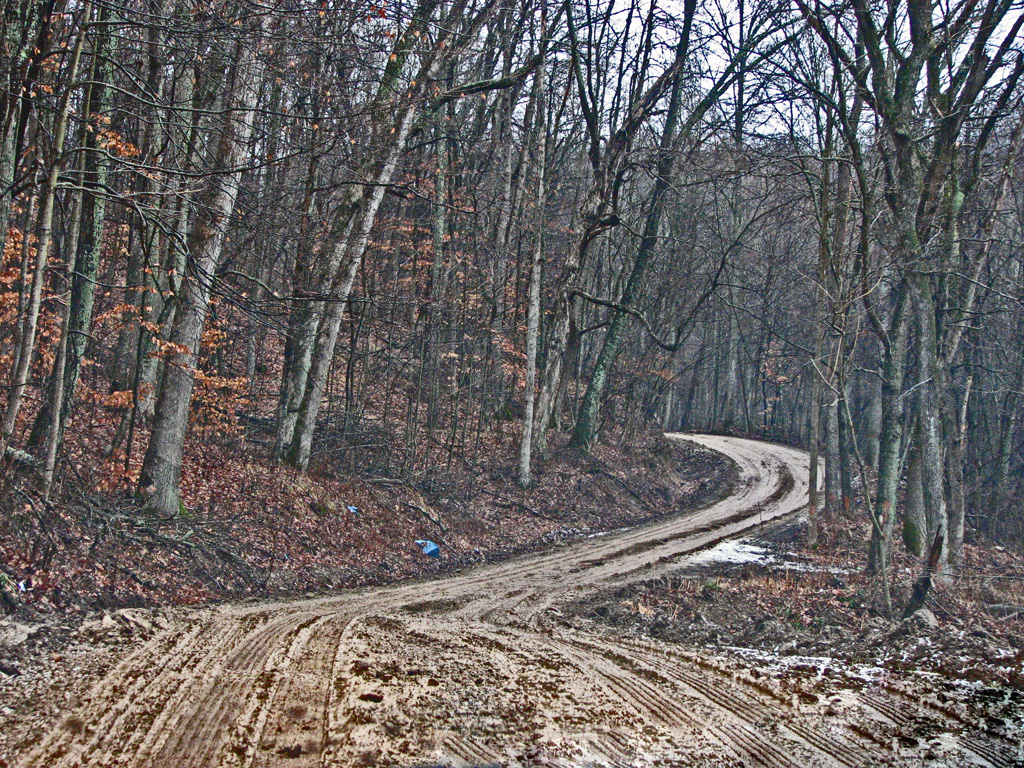
- Along a road in northwestern Sunfish Township

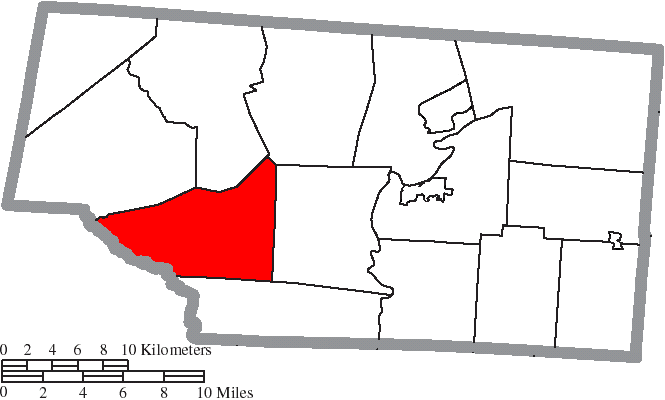
- Location of Sunfish Township in Pike County
- Coordinates: 39°2′16″N 83°12′27″W
- Country: United States
- State: Ohio
- County: Pike

Area
  - Total: 32.7 sq mi (84.8 km^{2})
  - Land: 32.7 sq mi (84.8 km^{2})
  - Water: 0 sq mi (0.0 km^{2})
- Elevation: 1,138 ft (347 m)

Population (2020)
  - Total: 1,115
  - Density: 34.1/sq mi (13.1/km^{2})
- Time zone: UTC-5 (Eastern (EST))
  - Summer (DST): UTC-4 (EDT)
- FIPS code: 39-75637
- GNIS feature ID: 1086819

Sunfish Township is one of the fourteen townships of Pike County, Ohio, United States. The 2020 census found 1,115 people in the township.

== Geography ==
Located in the southwestern part of the county, it borders the following townships:

- Benton Township - north
- Pebble Township - northeast
- Newton Township - east
- Camp Creek Township - southeast
- Rarden Township, Scioto County - south
- Franklin Township, Adams County - west
- Mifflin Township - northwest

No municipalities are located in Sunfish Township. Elm Grove has been a populated place within the township since before 1812.

== Name and history ==
It is the only Sunfish Township statewide.

== Government ==
The township is governed by a three-member board of trustees, who are elected in November of odd-numbered years to a four-year term beginning on the following January 1. Two are elected in the year after the presidential election and one is elected in the year before it. There is also an elected township fiscal officer, who serves a four-year term beginning on April 1 of the year after the election, which is held in November of the year before the presidential election. Vacancies in the fiscal officership or on the board of trustees are filled by the remaining trustees.
