= Union Township, Pike County, Ohio =

Township in Ohio, US

- Township
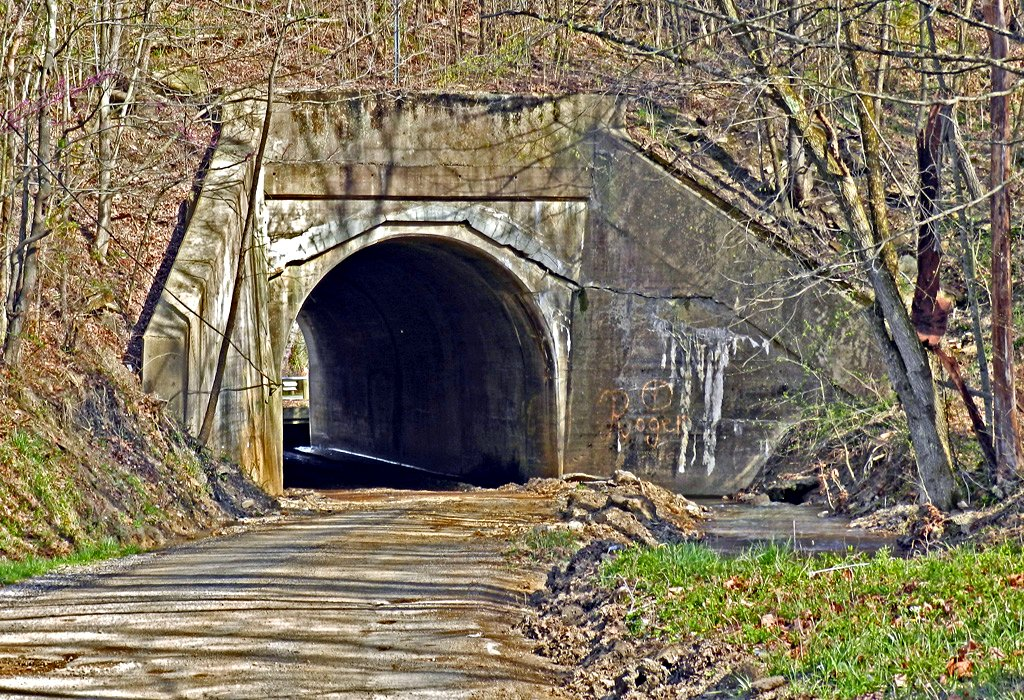
- Rail bridge over Brigner Road

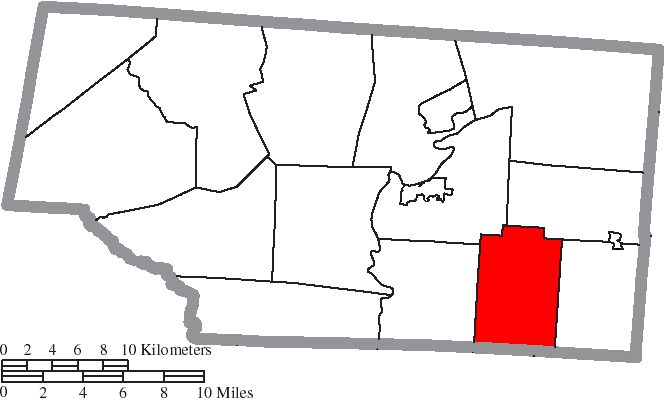
- Location of Union Township in Pike County
- Coordinates: 39°0′15″N 82°54′33″W
- Country: United States
- State: Ohio
- County: Pike

Area
  - Total: 23.6 sq mi (61.0 km^{2})
  - Land: 23.6 sq mi (61.0 km^{2})
  - Water: 0 sq mi (0.0 km^{2})
- Elevation: 725 ft (221 m)

Population (2020)
  - Total: 1,227
  - Density: 52.1/sq mi (20.1/km^{2})
- Time zone: UTC-5 (Eastern (EST))
  - Summer (DST): UTC-4 (EDT)
- FIPS code: 39-78512
- GNIS feature ID: 1086820

Union Township is one of the fourteen townships of Pike County, Ohio, United States. The 2020 census found 1,227 people in the township.

== Geography ==
Located in the southeastern part of the county, it borders the following townships:

- Beaver Township - northeast
- Marion Township - east
- Madison Township, Scioto County - southeast
- Jefferson Township, Scioto County - south
- Valley Township, Scioto County - southwest corner
- Scioto Township - west
- Seal Township - northwest

No municipalities are located in Union Township.

== Name and history ==
It is one of twenty-seven Union Townships statewide.

== Government ==
The township is governed by a three-member board of trustees, who are elected in November of odd-numbered years to a four-year term beginning on the following January 1. Two are elected in the year after the presidential election and one is elected in the year before it. There is also an elected township fiscal officer, who serves a four-year term beginning on April 1 of the year after the election, which is held in November of the year before the presidential election. Vacancies in the fiscal officership or on the board of trustees are filled by the remaining trustees.
