= Franklin Township, Adams County, Ohio =

Township in Ohio, US

- Township
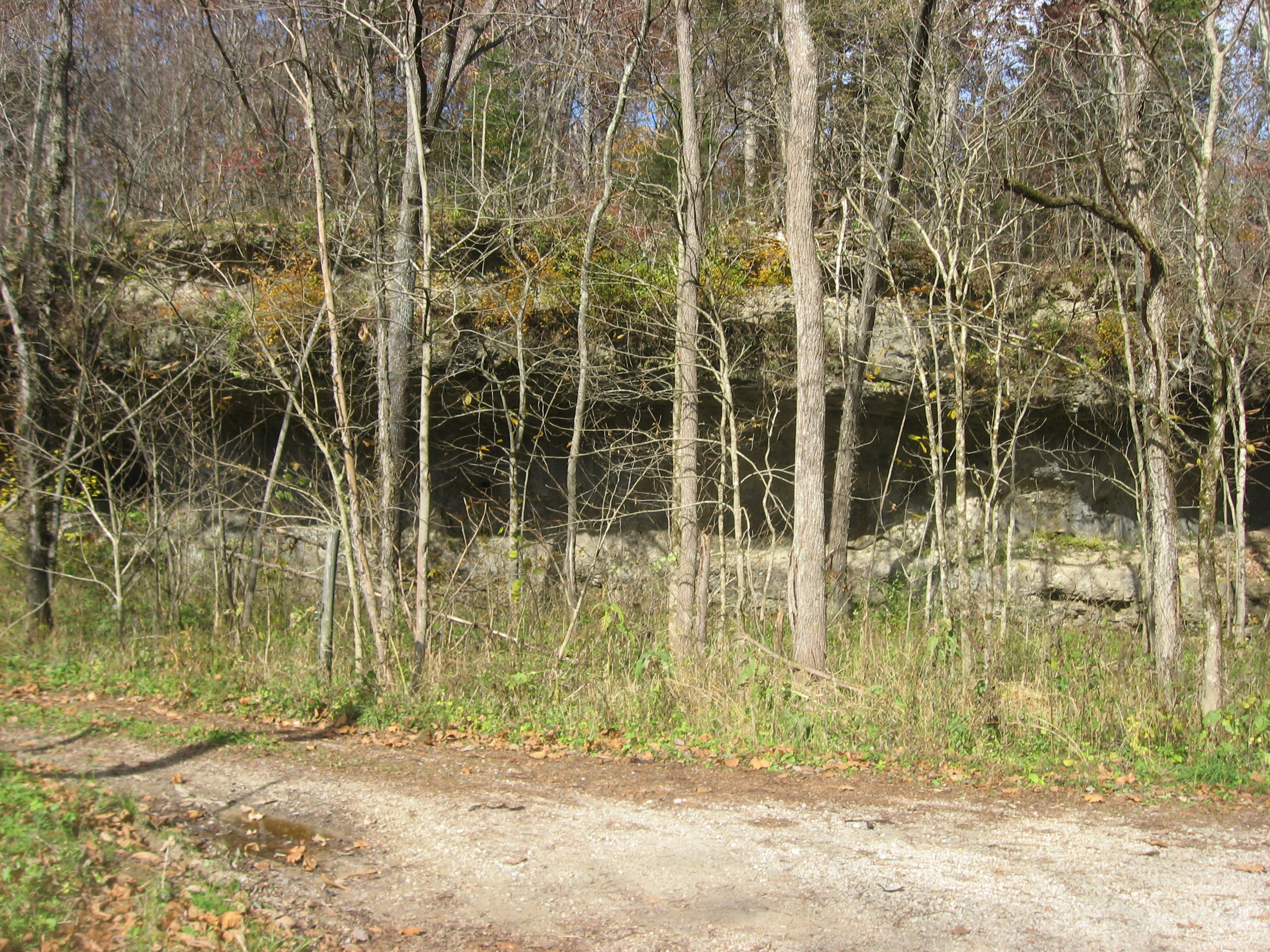
- A large rockshelter on Bacon Flat Road

- Location in Adams County and the state of Ohio.
- Coordinates: 38°59′29″N 83°20′2″W
- Country: United States
- State: Ohio
- County: Adams

Area
  - Total: 54.2 sq mi (140.5 km^{2})
  - Land: 54.1 sq mi (140.2 km^{2})
  - Water: 0.12 sq mi (0.3 km^{2})
- Elevation: 732 ft (223 m)

Population (2020)
  - Total: 1,097
  - Density: 20/sq mi (7.9/km^{2})
- Time zone: UTC-5 (Eastern (EST))
  - Summer (DST): UTC-4 (EDT)
- FIPS code: 39-28196
- GNIS feature ID: 1085676

Franklin Township is one of the fifteen townships of Adams County, Ohio, United States. The population was 1,097 at the 2020 census.

== Geography ==
Located in the northeastern corner of the county, it borders the following townships:

- Mifflin Township, Pike County - north
- Sunfish Township, Pike County - northeast
- Rarden Township, Scioto County - east
- Meigs Township - south
- Bratton Township - west
- Brushcreek Township, Highland County - northwest corner

No municipalities are located in Franklin Township.

== History ==
Franklin Township was organized in 1828. It is named for Benjamin Franklin.

It is one of twenty-one Franklin Townships statewide.

== Government ==
The township is governed by a three-member board of trustees, who are elected in November of odd-numbered years to a four-year term beginning on the following January 1. Two are elected in the year after the presidential election and one is elected in the year before it. There is also an elected township fiscal officer, who serves a four-year term beginning on April 1 of the year after the election, which is held in November of the year before the presidential election. Vacancies in the fiscal officership or on the board of trustees are filled by the remaining trustees.
