= Ohio State Route 239 =

State highway in Scioto County, Ohio, US

State Route 239

Route information
- Maintained by ODOT
- Length: 1.22 mi (1.96 km)
- Existed: 1924–present

Major junctions
- South end: US 52 near West Portsmouth
- North end: SR 73 / SR 104 near West Portsmouth

Location
- Country: United States
- State: Ohio
- Counties: Scioto

Highway system
- Ohio State Highway System; Interstate; US; State; Scenic
← SR 238	→ SR 240

State Route 239 (SR 239) is a short north–south state highway in the southern part of the U.S. state of Ohio. The southern terminus of SR 239 is at U.S. Route 52 (US 52), and its northern terminus is at the SR 73/SR 104 concurrency. Both endpoints are situated near West Portsmouth.

Created in the mid-1920s, SR 239 mainly provides access from the southbound direction of the SR 73/SR 104 concurrency to westbound US 52, and vice versa.

== Route description ==
All of SR 239 exists within Washington Township in southern Scioto County. The state highway is not included as a part of the National Highway System.

SR 239 begins at a diamond interchange with US 52, with the highway forming a T-intersection with the ramp from and to eastbound US 52. The highway heads in a north-northeasterly direction away from the interchange, traversing through a primarily residential area. In doing so, it intersects a series of side streets, and is bounded by scattered patches of woods along the way. SR 239 arcs to the northeast, passes its intersection with County Road 126 (Slab Run Road), and enters into a commercial district within the settlement of Stockham. Two blocks after County Road 126, SR 239 meets Galena Pike, makes a 90-degree turn to the east-southeast, and one block later, comes to an end when it arrives at a T-intersection with SR 73/SR 104 just south of West Portsmouth.

All of SR 239 lies on flat terrain and is in the flood plain of the Scioto and Ohio rivers. The highway is also prone to flooding during heavy rains, which are created by the backups of the two rivers.

== History ==
When it was first designated in 1924, SR 239 was routed along the same path within Washington Township that it maintains to this day. Except for the construction of the interchange at US 52 and a slight realignment of SR 73/SR 104 in West Portsmouth, the highway has not experienced any significant changes since its creation.

== Major intersections ==
The entire route is in Washington Township, Scioto County.

mi	km	Destinations	Notes
0.00	0.00	US 52 east – Portsmouth	Interchange
0.29	0.47	SR 239-D to US 52 west – Cincinnati	Northern terminus of SR 239-D
1.22	1.96	SR 73 / SR 104 – Hillsboro, Portsmouth, Kentucky	
1.000 mi = 1.609 km; 1.000 km = 0.621 mi

== State Route 239-D ==
State Route 239-D (SR 239-D) is the designation that ODOT has applied to the 0.28-mile-long (0.45 km) one-way ramp that connects southbound SR 239 with westbound US 52 at the southern end of the state route.
