= Wakefield, Ohio =

Unincorporated community in Ohio, U.S.

Coordinates: 38°58′13″N 83°01′12″W

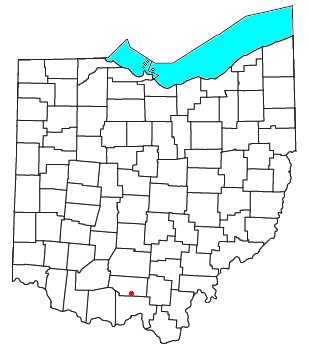
Location of Wakefield, Ohio

Wakefield is an unincorporated community in southwestern Scioto Township, Pike County, Ohio, United States. It historically had a post office, with the ZIP code 45687. Although the post office was closed on September 2, 2005, the community retains its ZIP code. It lies along Wakefield Mound Road.

== Gallery ==
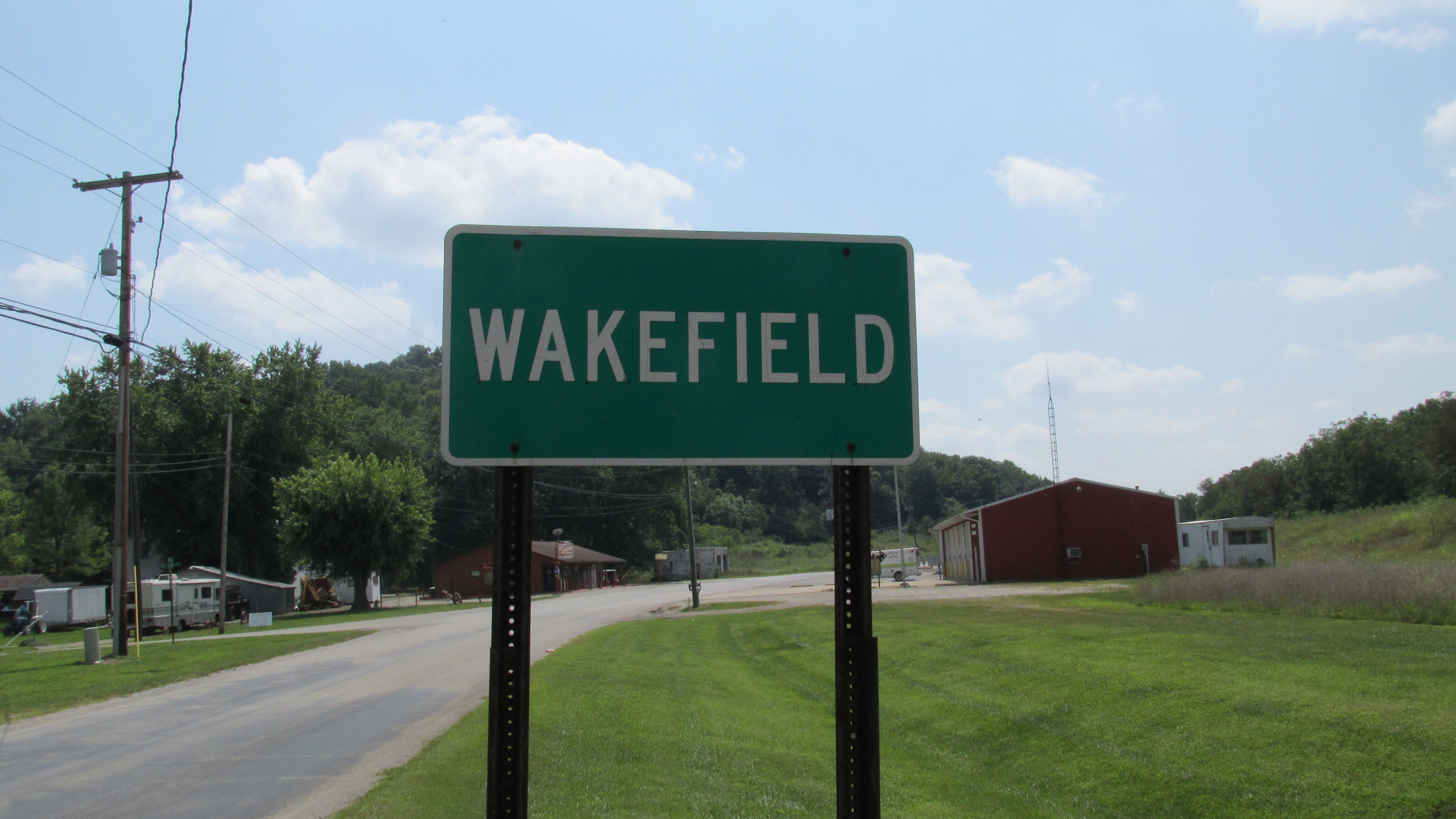
Wakefield community sign

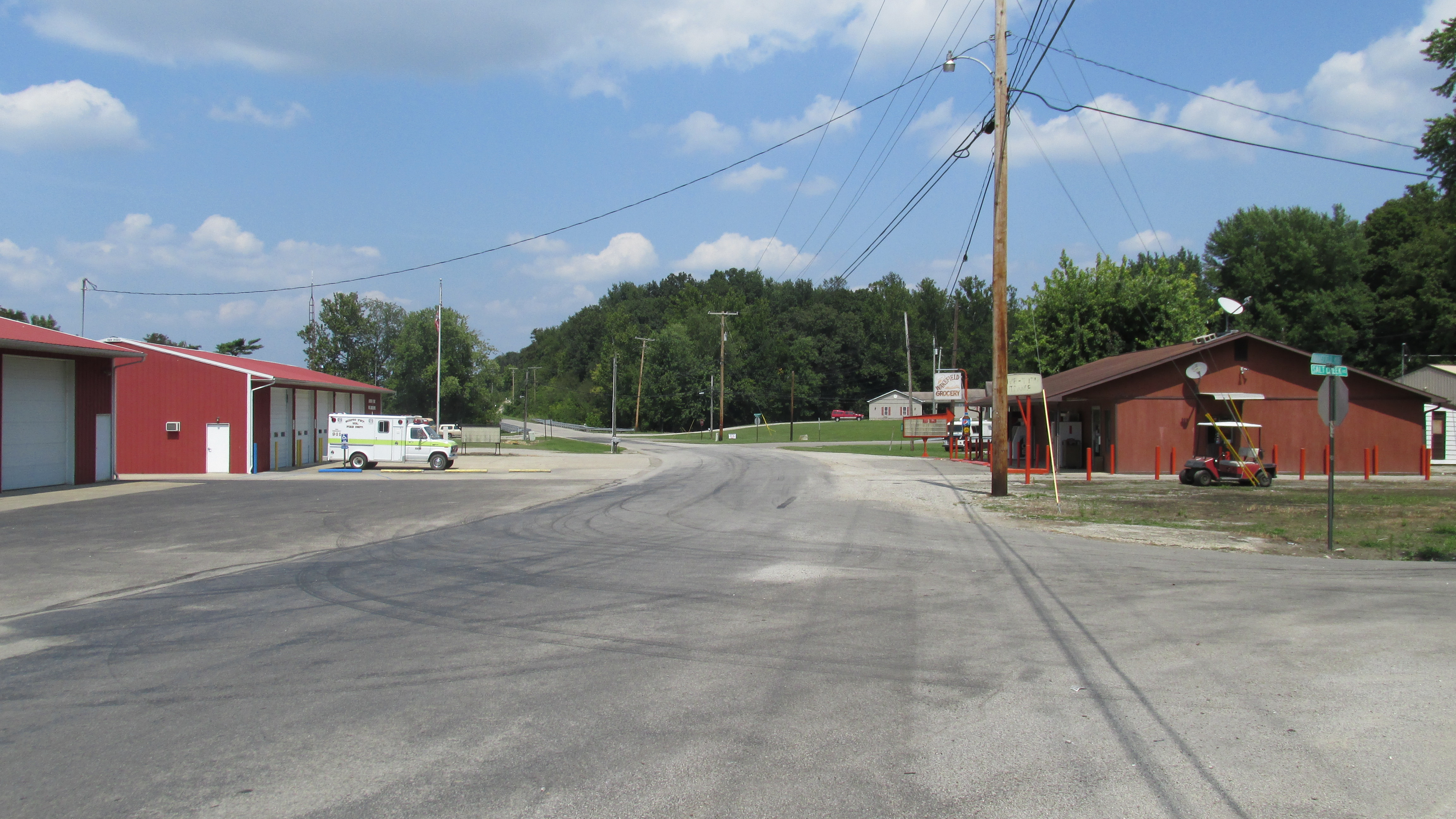
Looking north on Wakefield Mound Road in Wakefield
