= Scioto Township =

Scioto Township may refer to:

- Scioto Township, Delaware County, Ohio
- Scioto Township, Jackson County, Ohio
- Scioto Township, Pickaway County, Ohio
- Scioto Township, Pike County, Ohio
- Scioto Township, Ross County, Ohio
