= Rarden Township, Scioto County, Ohio =

Township in Ohio, US

- Township
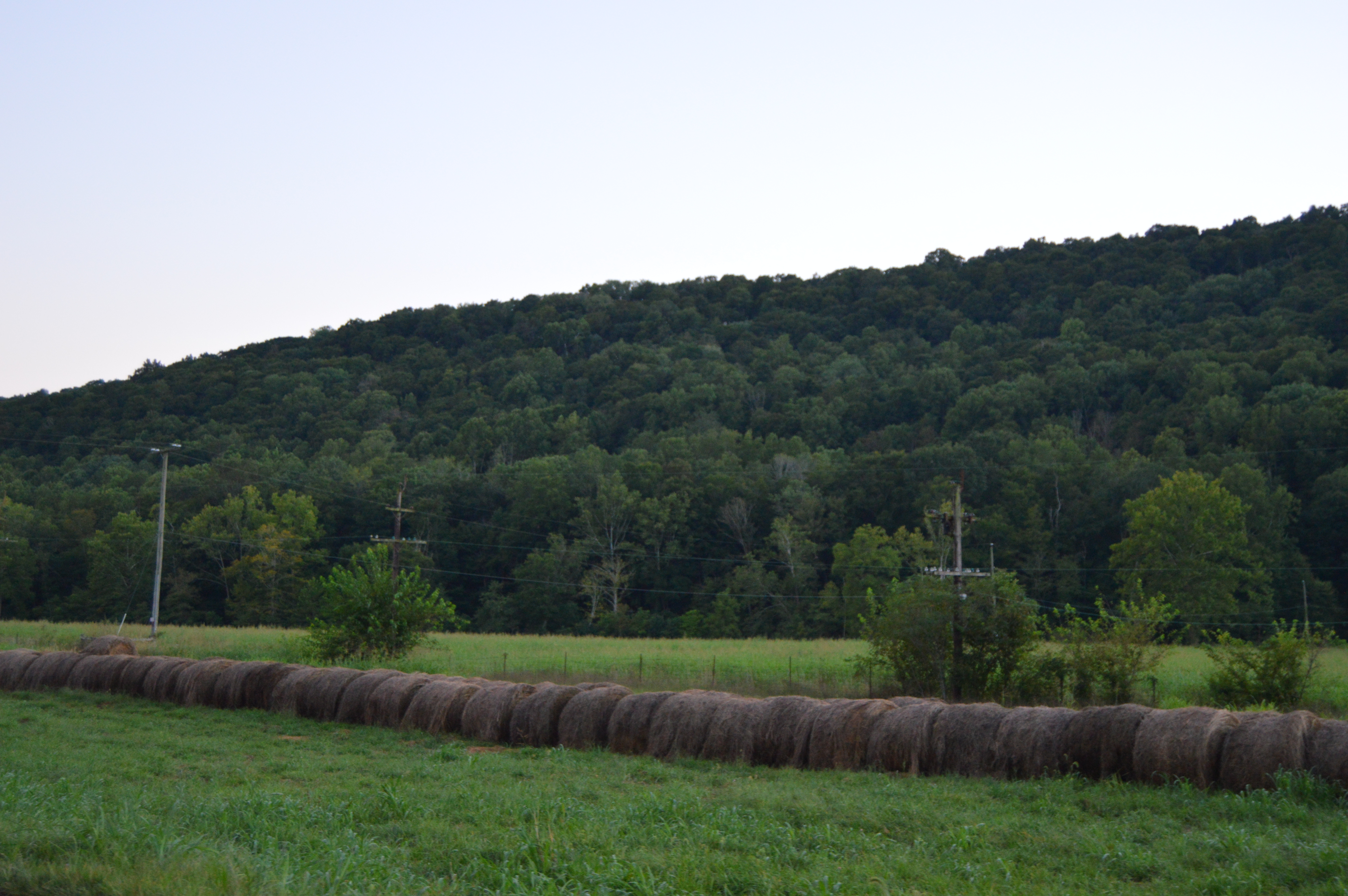
- State Route 73 southeast of Rarden

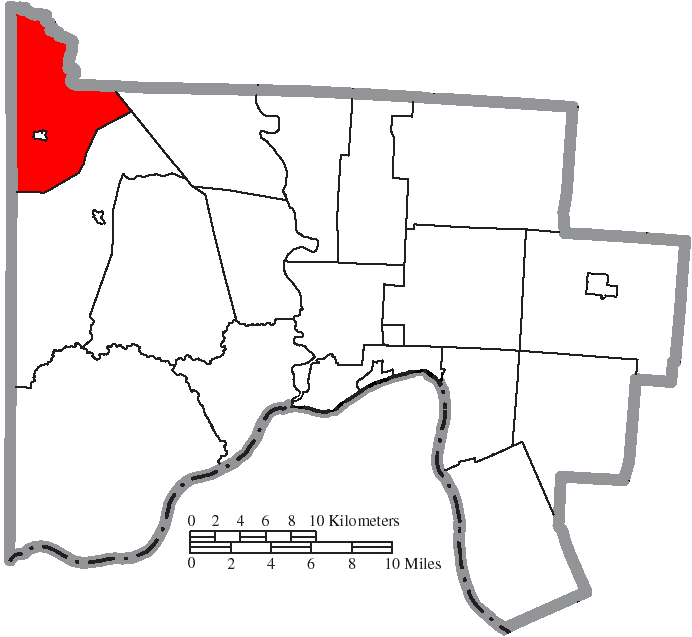
- Location of Rarden Township in Scioto County
- Coordinates: 38°56′33″N 83°14′7″W
- Country: United States
- State: Ohio
- County: Scioto

Area
  - Total: 31.7 sq mi (82.2 km^{2})
  - Land: 31.7 sq mi (82.2 km^{2})
  - Water: 0 sq mi (0.0 km^{2})
- Elevation: 1,063 ft (324 m)

Population (2020)
  - Total: 1,106
  - Density: 34.8/sq mi (13.5/km^{2})
- Time zone: UTC-5 (Eastern (EST))
  - Summer (DST): UTC-4 (EDT)
- ZIP code: 45671
- Area code: 740
- FIPS code: 39-65522
- GNIS feature ID: 1086934

Rarden Township is one of the sixteen townships of Scioto County, Ohio, United States. The 2020 census counted 1,106 people in the township.

== Geography ==
Located in the northwestern corner of the county, it borders the following townships:

- Sunfish Township, Pike County - north
- Camp Creek Township, Pike County - northeast
- Morgan Township - east
- Brush Creek Township - south
- Meigs Township, Adams County - southwest
- Franklin Township, Adams County - west

The village of Rarden lies in the center of the township.

== Name and history ==
Rarden Township was organized January 10, 1891. The township was named after Thomas Rarden, pioneer. It is the only Rarden Township statewide.

== Government ==
The township is governed by a three-member board of trustees, who are elected in November of odd-numbered years to a four-year term beginning on the following January 1. Two are elected in the year after the presidential election and one is elected in the year before it. There is also an elected township fiscal officer, who serves a four-year term beginning on April 1 of the year after the election, which is held in November of the year before the presidential election. Vacancies in the fiscal officership or on the board of trustees are filled by the remaining trustees.
