= Clarktown, Ohio =

- CDP
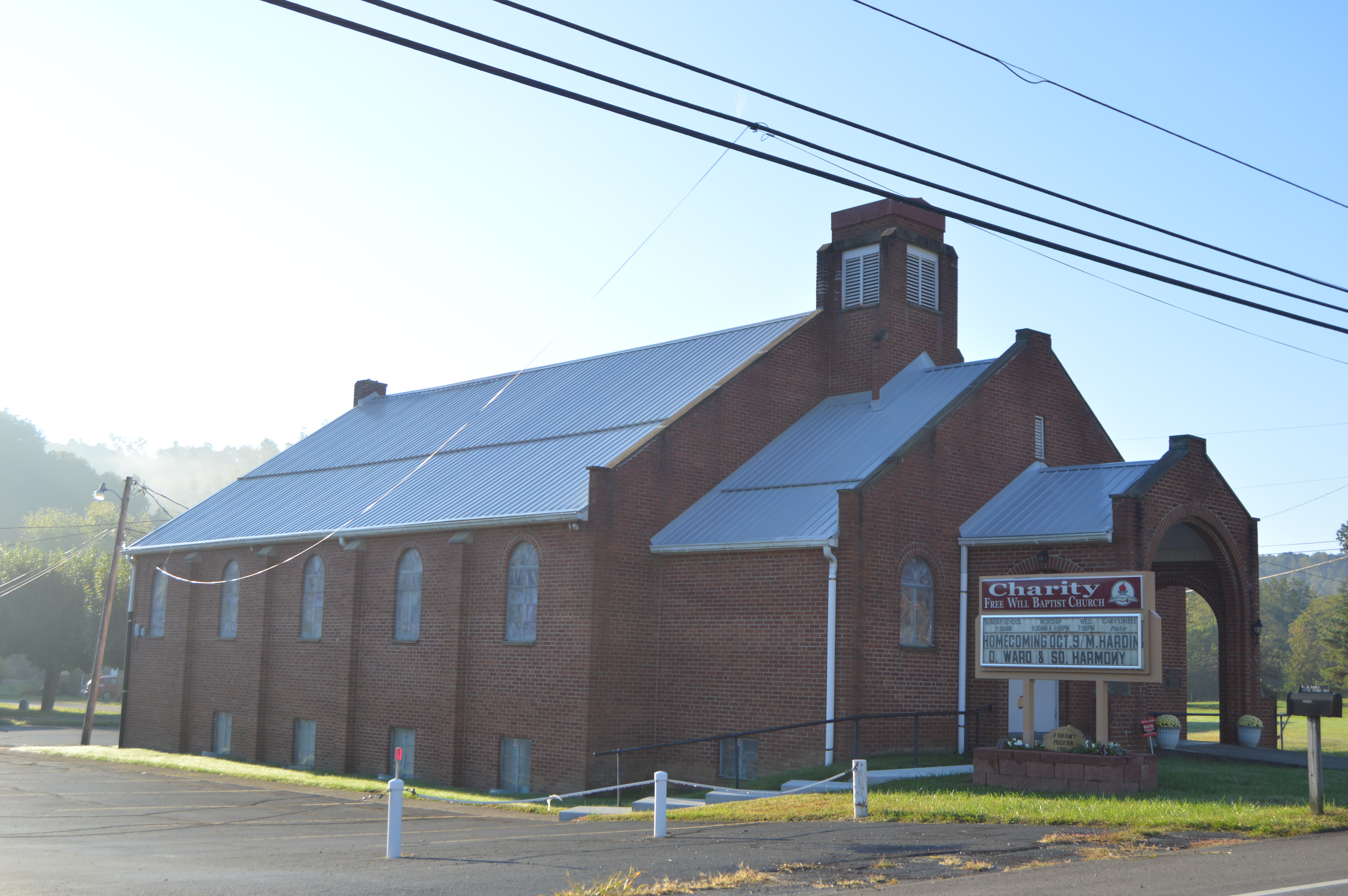
- Baptist church on State Route 139

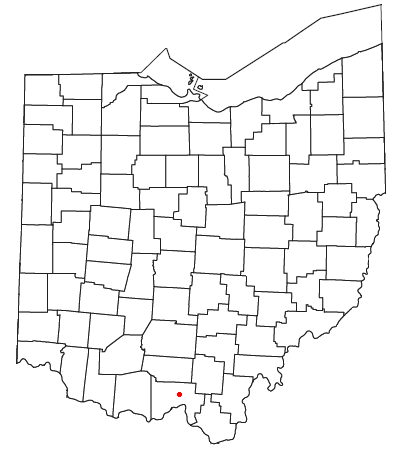
- Location of Clarktown, Ohio
- Coordinates: 38°50′59″N 82°54′31″W
- Country: United States
- State: Ohio
- County: Scioto
- Township: Jefferson
- Elevation: 666 ft (203 m)

Population (2020)
  - Total: 911
- Time zone: UTC-5 (Eastern (EST))
  - Summer (DST): UTC-4 (EDT)
- Area codes: 740, 220
- GNIS feature ID: 2633226

Clarktown is an unincorporated community and census-designated place in southeastern Jefferson Township, Scioto County, Ohio, United States. As of the 2020 census it had a population of 911.

== Geography ==
Located at the intersection of State Route 139 with Burns Hollow and Blue Run roads, it lies 5 miles (8 km) southeast of Lucasville and 10 miles (16 km) northeast of the city of Portsmouth, the county seat of Scioto County. Long Run, a tributary of the Rocky Fork of the Little Scioto River, flows past the community.
