= Rush Township, Scioto County, Ohio =

Township in Ohio, US

- Township
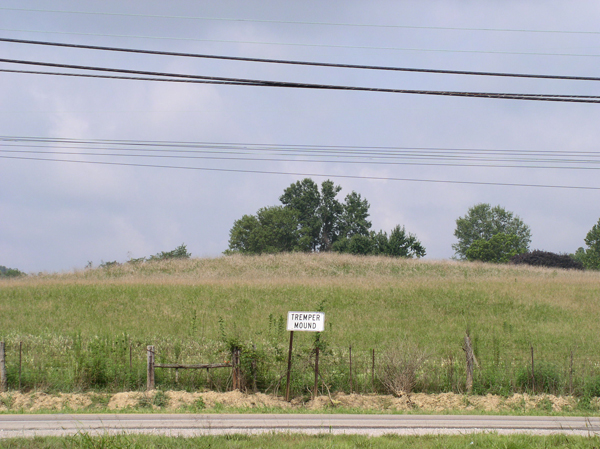
- The Tremper Mound and Works

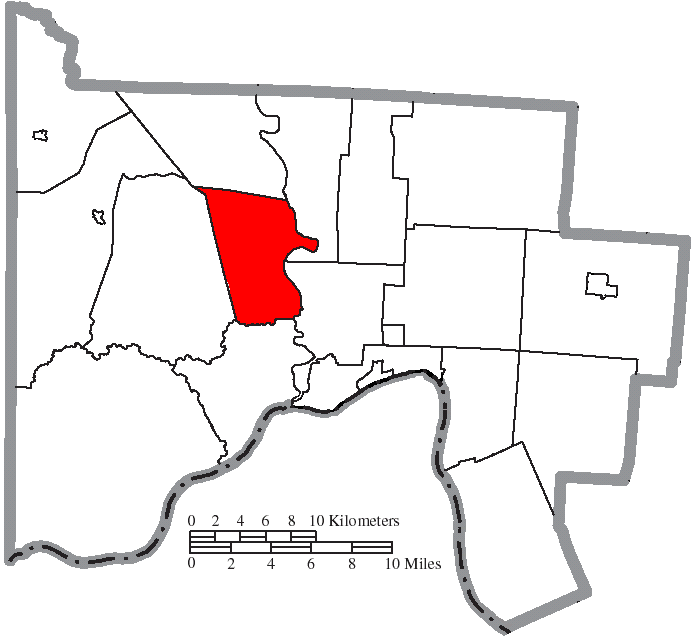
- Location of Rush Township in Scioto County
- Coordinates: 38°50′28″N 83°2′59″W
- Country: United States
- State: Ohio
- County: Scioto

Area
  - Total: 23.8 sq mi (61.7 km^{2})
  - Land: 23.5 sq mi (60.9 km^{2})
  - Water: 0.31 sq mi (0.8 km^{2})
- Elevation: 509 ft (155 m)

Population (2020)
  - Total: 2,939
  - Density: 125/sq mi (48.3/km^{2})
- Time zone: UTC-5 (Eastern (EST))
  - Summer (DST): UTC-4 (EDT)
- FIPS code: 39-69092
- GNIS feature ID: 1086935

Rush Township is one of the sixteen townships of Scioto County, Ohio, United States. The 2020 census counted 2,939 people in the township.

== Geography ==
Located in the center of the county, it borders the following townships:

- Morgan Township - north
- Valley Township - northeast
- Clay Township - southeast
- Washington Township - south
- Union Township - west

No municipalities are located in Rush Township, although the census-designated place of McDermott lies in the township's west.

== Name and history ==
It is named for Dr. Benjamin Rush, an early physician and Founding Father of the United States. Statewide, other Rush Townships are located in Champaign and Tuscarawas counties.

Rush Township was organized June 3, 1867 by Levi Kirkendall. Its earliest settlers date to 1796.

== Government ==
The township is governed by a three-member board of trustees, who are elected in November of odd-numbered years to a four-year term beginning on the following January 1. Two are elected in the year after the presidential election and one is elected in the year before it. There is also an elected township fiscal officer, who serves a four-year term beginning on April 1 of the year after the election, which is held in November of the year before the presidential election. Vacancies in the fiscal officership or on the board of trustees are filled by the remaining trustees.
