= Morgan Township, Scioto County, Ohio =

Township in Ohio, US

- Township
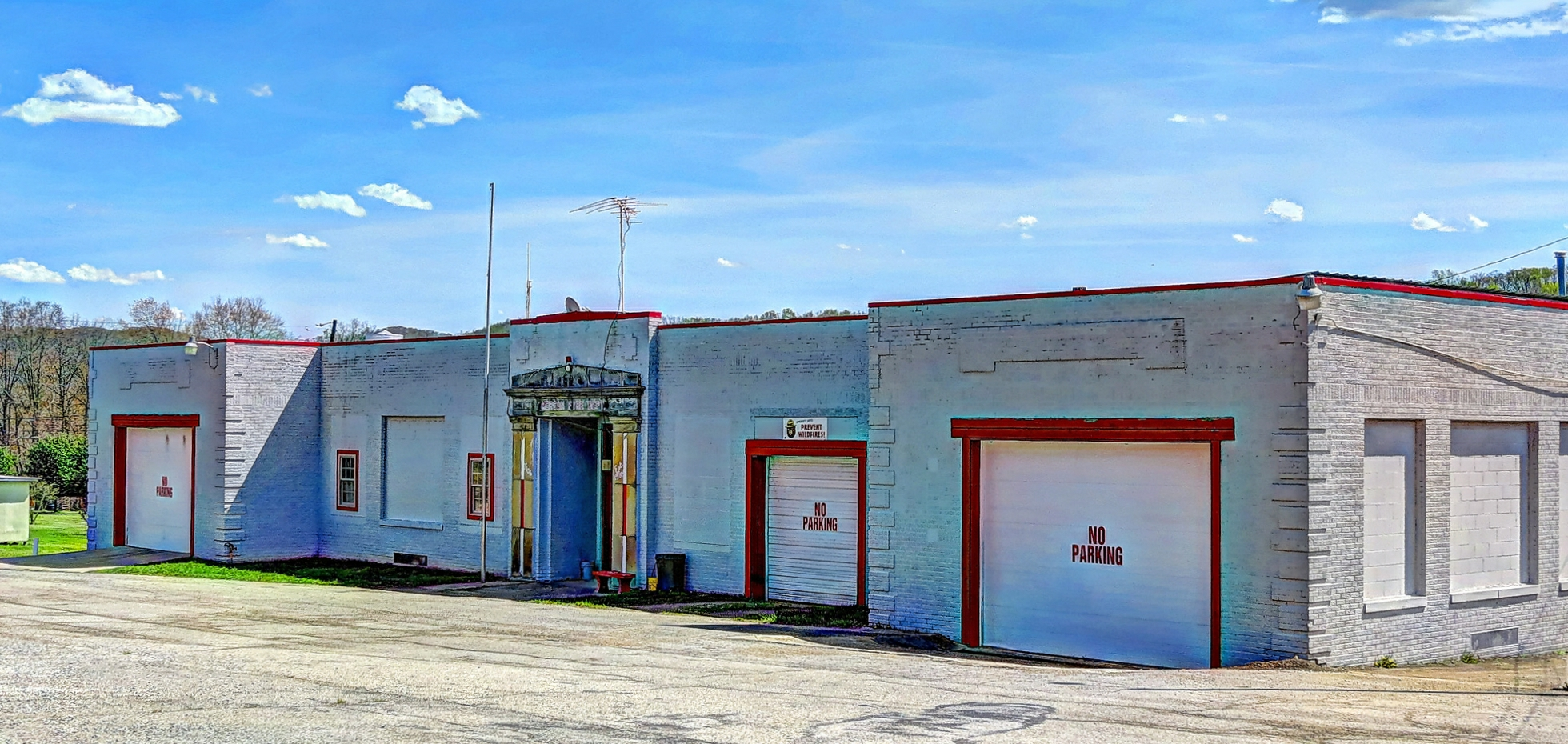
- Township fire department

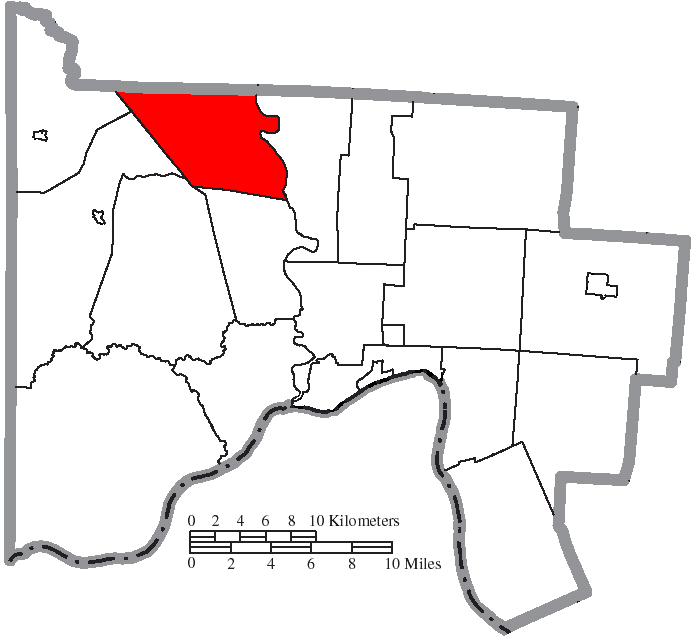
- Location of Morgan Township in Scioto County
- Coordinates: 38°55′32″N 83°5′15″W
- Country: United States
- State: Ohio
- County: Scioto

Area
  - Total: 30.2 sq mi (78.1 km^{2})
  - Land: 29.9 sq mi (77.4 km^{2})
  - Water: 0.27 sq mi (0.7 km^{2})
- Elevation: 636 ft (194 m)

Population (2020)
  - Total: 2,232
  - Density: 75/sq mi (28.8/km^{2})
- Time zone: UTC-5 (Eastern (EST))
  - Summer (DST): UTC-4 (EDT)
- FIPS code: 39-52150
- GNIS feature ID: 1086929

Morgan Township is one of the sixteen townships of Scioto County, Ohio, United States. The 2020 census counted 2,232 people in the township.

== Geography ==
Located in the northwestern part of the county, it borders the following townships:

- Camp Creek Township, Pike County - north
- Scioto Township, Pike County - northeast corner
- Valley Township - east
- Rush Township - south
- Union Township - southwest
- Brush Creek Township - west
- Rarden Township - northwest

No municipalities are located in Morgan Township.

== Name and history ==
Named after settler Thomas Morgan, it is one of six Morgan Townships statewide.

Morgan Township was organized in June 1825.

== Government ==
The township is governed by a three-member board of trustees, who are elected in November of odd-numbered years to a four-year term beginning on the following January 1. Two are elected in the year after the presidential election and one is elected in the year before it. There is also an elected township fiscal officer, who serves a four-year term beginning on April 1 of the year after the election, which is held in November of the year before the presidential election. Vacancies in the fiscal officership or on the board of trustees are filled by the remaining trustees.
