= Jefferson Township, Scioto County, Ohio =

Township in Ohio, US

- Township
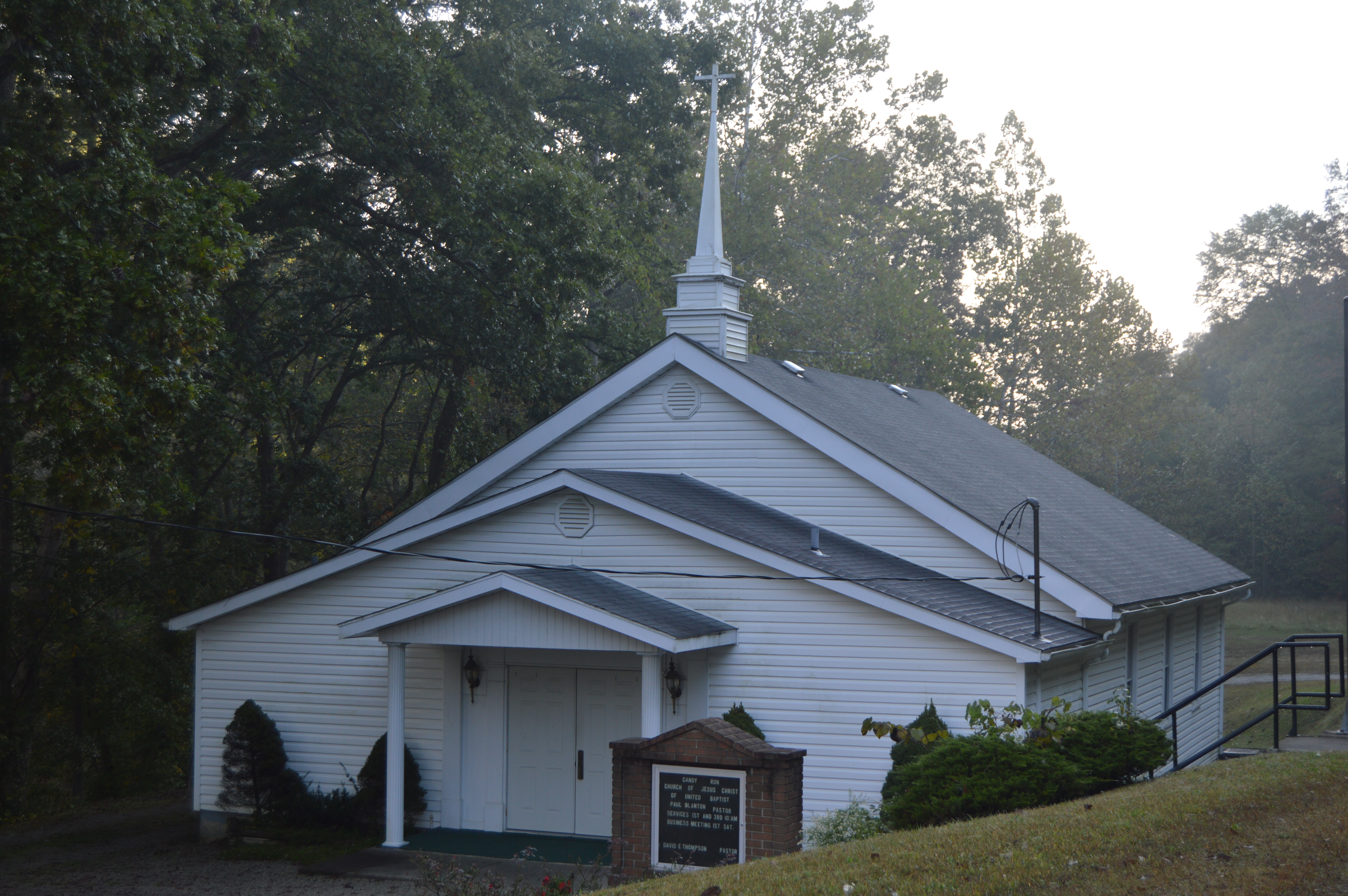
- Baptist church on Burns Hollow Road

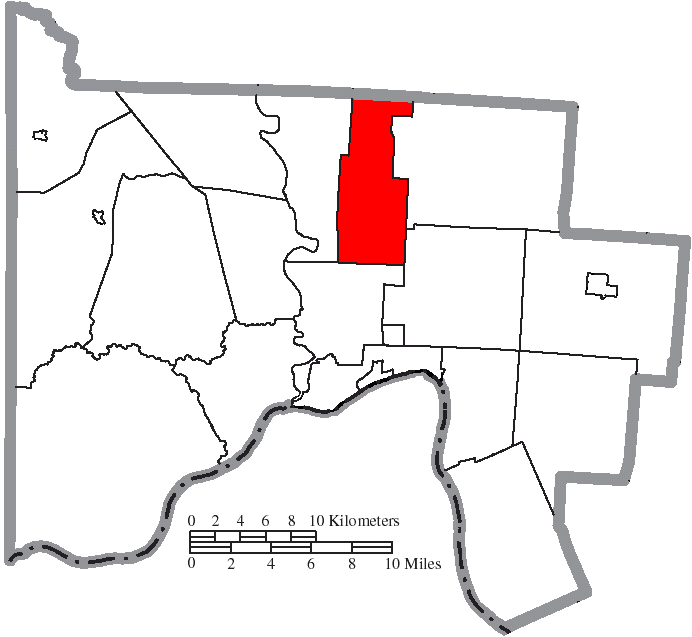
- Location of Jefferson Township in Scioto County
- Coordinates: 38°53′13″N 82°55′59″W
- Country: United States
- State: Ohio
- County: Scioto

Area
  - Total: 24.6 sq mi (63.8 km^{2})
  - Land: 24.6 sq mi (63.8 km^{2})
  - Water: 0 sq mi (0.0 km^{2})
- Elevation: 942 ft (287 m)

Population (2020)
  - Total: 2,546
  - Density: 103/sq mi (39.9/km^{2})
- Time zone: UTC-5 (Eastern (EST))
  - Summer (DST): UTC-4 (EDT)
- FIPS code: 39-38815
- GNIS feature ID: 1086927
- Website: https://sites.google.com/view/jeffersontownshipscioto/home

Jefferson Township is one of the sixteen townships of Scioto County, Ohio, United States. The 2020 census counted 2,546 people in the township.

== Geography ==
Located in the northern part of the county, it borders the following townships:

- Union Township, Pike County - north
- Madison Township - east
- Harrison Township - southeast
- Clay Township - south
- Valley Township - west
- Scioto Township, Pike County - northwest corner

No municipalities are located in Jefferson Township, although the census-designated place of Clarktown lies in the township's southeast.

== Name and history ==
Named after Thomas Jefferson, it is one of twenty-four Jefferson Townships statewide.

Jefferson Township was established prior to 1810.

In 1833, Jefferson Township contained two water power gristmills, one saw mill, and one horse mill and distillery, one tavern and one tan yard.

== Government ==
The township is governed by a three-member board of trustees, who are elected in November of odd-numbered years to a four-year term beginning on the following January 1. Two are elected in the year after the presidential election and one is elected in the year before it. There is also an elected township fiscal officer, who serves a four-year term beginning on April 1 of the year after the election, which is held in November of the year before the presidential election. Vacancies in the fiscal officership or on the board of trustees are filled by the remaining trustees.

Ohio Department of Corrections Southern Ohio Correctional Facility is partly in the township.
