= Beaver Township, Pike County, Ohio =

Township in Ohio, US

- Township
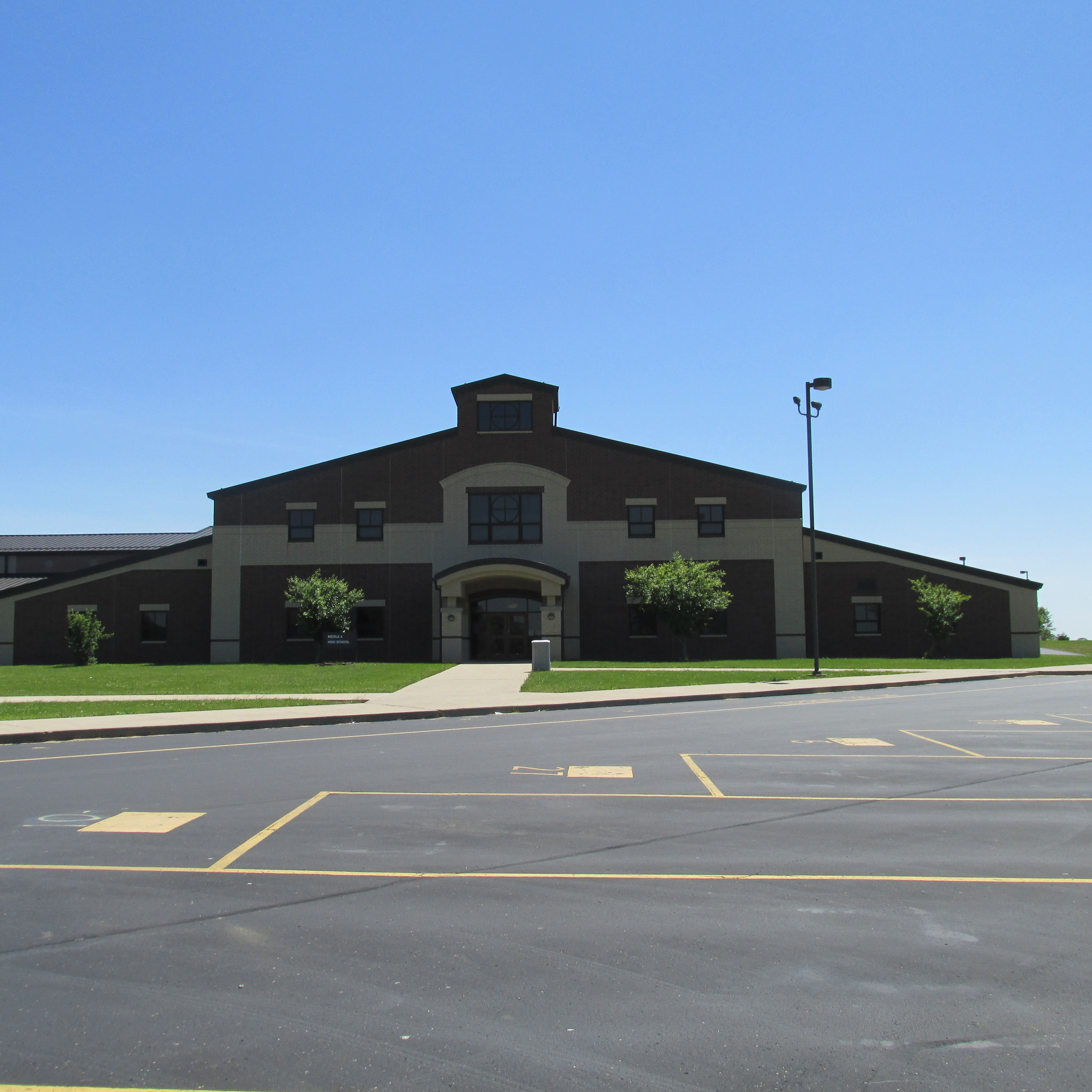
- Eastern High School outside Beaver

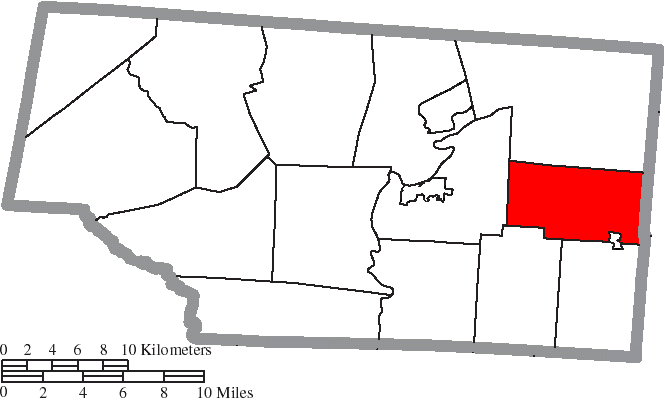
- Location of Beaver Township in Pike County
- Coordinates: 39°2′23″N 82°51′57″W
- Country: United States
- State: Ohio
- County: Pike

Area
  - Total: 23.9 sq mi (61.8 km^{2})
  - Land: 23.9 sq mi (61.8 km^{2})
  - Water: 0 sq mi (0.0 km^{2})
- Elevation: 823 ft (251 m)

Population (2020)
  - Total: 1,291
  - Density: 54.1/sq mi (20.9/km^{2})
- Time zone: UTC-5 (Eastern (EST))
  - Summer (DST): UTC-4 (EDT)
- ZIP code: 45613
- Area code: 740
- FIPS code: 39-04710
- GNIS feature ID: 1086807

Beaver Township is one of the fourteen townships of Pike County, Ohio, United States. The 2020 census found 1,291 people in the township.

== Geography ==
Located in the eastern part of the county, it borders the following townships:

- Jackson Township - north
- Liberty Township, Jackson County - east
- Scioto Township, Jackson County - southeast
- Marion Township - south
- Union Township - southwest
- Seal Township - west

Part of the village of Beaver is located in southeastern Beaver Township.

== Name and history ==
Beaver Township most likely takes its name from Beaver Creek. Statewide, other Beaver Townships are located in Mahoning and Noble counties.

== Government ==
The township is governed by a three-member board of trustees, who are elected in November of odd-numbered years to a four-year term beginning on the following January 1. Two are elected in the year after the presidential election and one is elected in the year before it. There is also an elected township fiscal officer, who serves a four-year term beginning on April 1 of the year after the election, which is held in November of the year before the presidential election. Vacancies in the fiscal officership or on the board of trustees are filled by the remaining trustees.
