= West Portsmouth, Ohio =

- Census-designated place
- Nickname: West Side
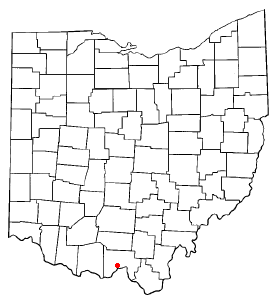
- Location of West Portsmouth, Ohio
- Coordinates: 38°45′48″N 83°02′35″W
- Country: United States
- State: Ohio
- County: Scioto

Area
  - Total: 4.71 sq mi (12.19 km^{2})
  - Land: 4.71 sq mi (12.19 km^{2})
  - Water: 0.0039 sq mi (0.01 km^{2})
- Elevation: 784 ft (239 m)

Population (2020)
  - Total: 2,928
  - Density: 622.3/sq mi (240.29/km^{2})
- Time zone: UTC-5 (Eastern (EST))
  - Summer (DST): UTC-4 (EDT)
- ZIP code: 45663
- Area code: 740
- FIPS code: 39-84140
- GNIS feature ID: 2393845

West Portsmouth is a census-designated place (CDP) in Scioto County, Ohio, United States. The population was 2,929 at the 2020 census.

== Geography ==
According to the United States Census Bureau, the CDP has a total area of 4.8 square miles (12 km^{2}), all land.

== Demographics ==
Historical population
| Census | Pop. | Note | %± |
|---|---|---|---|
| 2020 | 2,928 | | — |
U.S. Decennial Census

As of the census of 2000, there were 3,458 people, 1,368 households, and 995 families residing in the CDP. The population density was 728.5 inhabitants per square mile (281.3/km^{2}). There were 1,472 housing units at an average density of 310.1 per square mile (119.7/km^{2}). The racial makeup of the CDP was 96.99% White, 0.09% African American, 1.47% Native American, 0.06% Asian, 0.14% from other races, and 1.24% from two or more races. Hispanic or Latino of any race were 0.09% of the population.

There were 1,368 households, out of which 32.8% had children under the age of 18 living with them, 53.1% were married couples living together, 14.6% had a female householder with no husband present, and 27.2% were non-families. 23.1% of all households were made up of individuals, and 11.4% had someone living alone who was 65 years of age or older. The average household size was 2.53 and the average family size was 2.96.

In the CDP, the population was spread out, with 25.9% under the age of 18, 8.8% from 18 to 24, 28.9% from 25 to 44, 22.4% from 45 to 64, and 14.0% who were 65 years of age or older. The median age was 36 years. For every 100 females, there were 90.1 males. For every 100 females age 18 and over, there were 88.1 males.

The median income for a household in the CDP was $27,668, and the median income for a family was $31,281. Males had a median income of $27,193 versus $17,644 for females. The per capita income for the CDP was $12,345. About 18.9% of families and 22.1% of the population were below the poverty line, including 31.7% of those under age 18 and 17.0% of those age 65 or over.

== Notable person ==
- Earl Thomas Conley, country singer
