= Valley Township, Scioto County, Ohio =

Township in Ohio, US

- Township
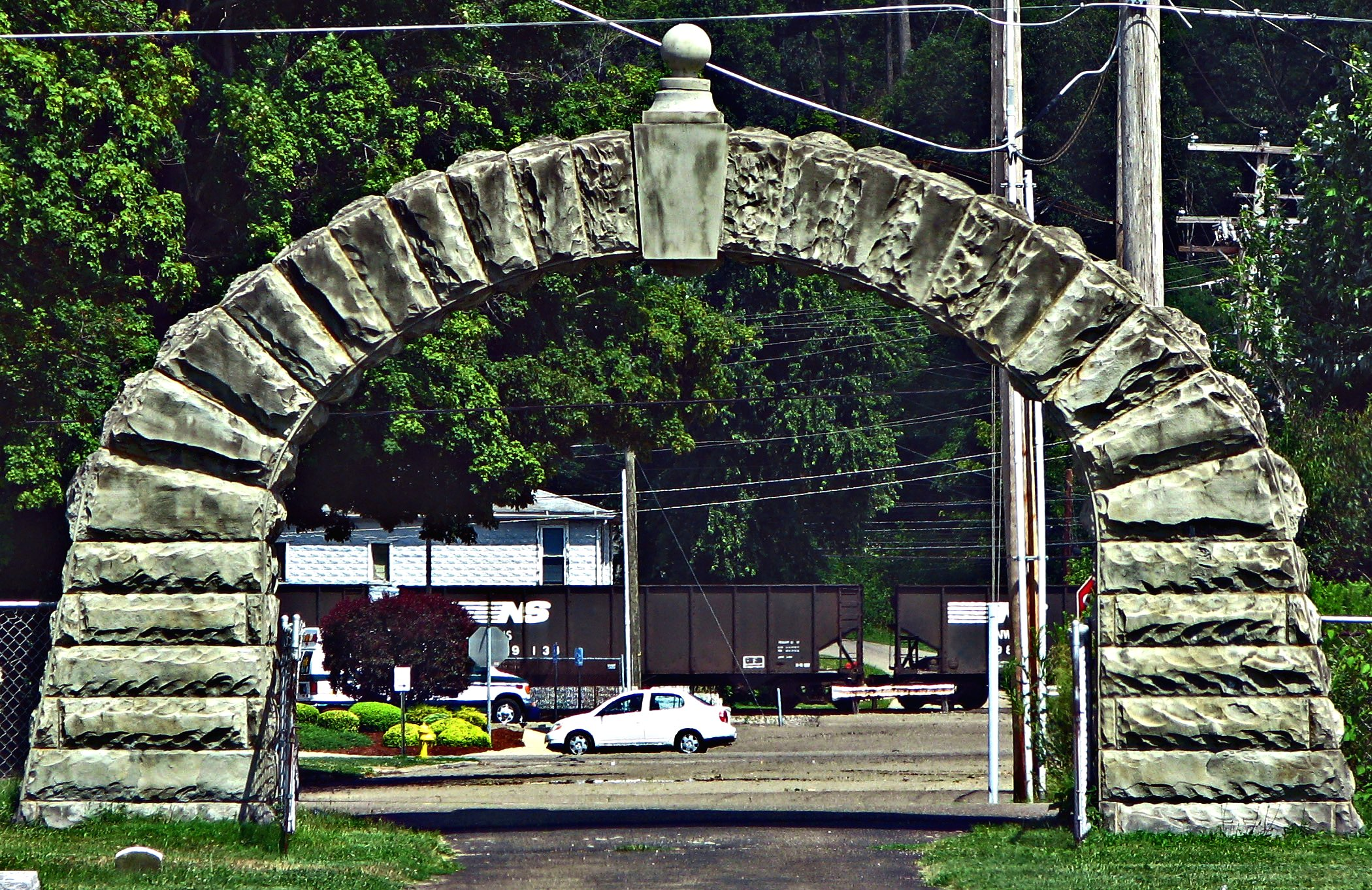
- Lucasville cemetery

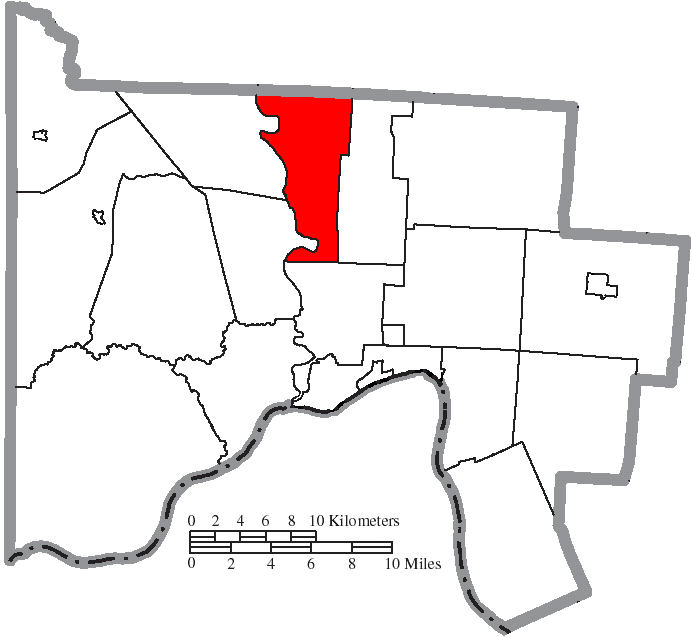
- Location of Valley Township in Scioto County
- Coordinates: 38°53′14″N 82°59′19″W
- Country: United States
- State: Ohio
- County: Scioto

Area
  - Total: 25.2 sq mi (65.2 km^{2})
  - Land: 24.7 sq mi (64.0 km^{2})
  - Water: 0.46 sq mi (1.2 km^{2})
- Elevation: 636 ft (194 m)

Population (2020)
  - Total: 3,635
  - Density: 147/sq mi (56.8/km^{2})
- Time zone: UTC-5 (Eastern (EST))
  - Summer (DST): UTC-4 (EDT)
- FIPS code: 39-79170
- GNIS feature ID: 1086937

Valley Township is one of the sixteen townships of Scioto County, Ohio, United States. The 2020 census counted 3,635 people in the township.

== Geography ==
Located in the northern part of the county, it borders the following townships:

- Scioto Township, Pike County - north
- Union Township, Pike County - northeast corner
- Jefferson Township - east
- Clay Township - south
- Rush Township - southwest
- Morgan Township - west
- Camp Creek Township, Pike County - northwest corner

No municipalities are located in Valley Township, although the census-designated place of Lucasville is located in the center of the township.

== Name and history ==
Statewide, the only other Valley Township is located in Guernsey County.

Valley Township was organized June 4, 1860. The township was named for the valley of the Scioto River.

== Government ==
The township is governed by a three-member board of trustees, who are elected in November of odd-numbered years to a four-year term beginning on the following January 1. Two are elected in the year after the presidential election and one is elected in the year before it. There is also an elected township fiscal officer, who serves a four-year term beginning on April 1 of the year after the election, which is held in November of the year before the presidential election. Vacancies in the fiscal officership or on the board of trustees are filled by the remaining trustees.

Ohio Department of Corrections Southern Ohio Correctional Facility is partly in the township.
