= 1804 United States presidential election in New Hampshire =

- November 5, 1804
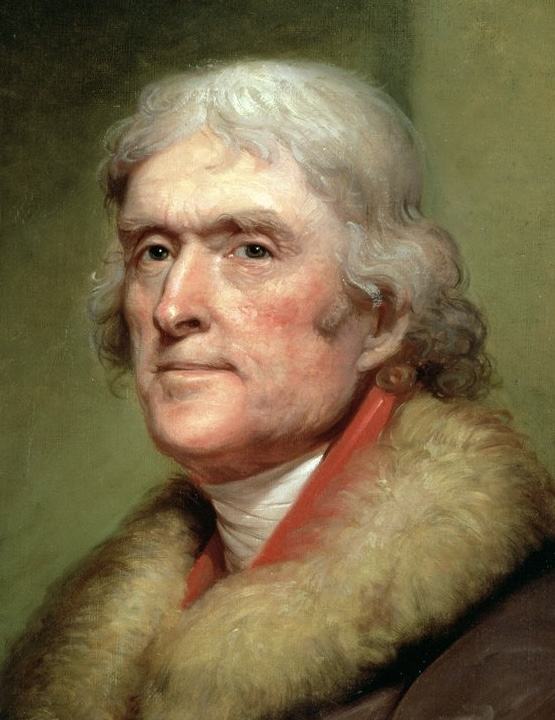

Nominee	Thomas Jefferson	Unpledged electors
Party	Democratic-Republican	Federalist
Home state	Virginia	N/A
Running mate	George Clinton	N/A
Electoral vote	7	0
Popular vote	9,088	8,386
Percentage	52.0%	47.99%
County results
Jefferson
50–60%
60–70%
Federalist electors
50–60%
60–70%
No data/vote
President before election
Thomas Jefferson
Democratic-Republican
Elected President
Thomas Jefferson
Democratic-Republican

A presidential election was held in New Hampshire on November 5, 1804, as part of the 1804 United States presidential election. The Democratic-Republican Party's ticket of incumbent president Thomas Jefferson and former New York governor George Clinton defeated the Federalist Party's ticket.

Jefferson won the national election in a landslide over the de facto Federalist candidate, Charles Cotesworth Pinckney. New Hampshire was one of three states where electors were chosen by popular vote which the Federalists seriously contested, in addition to Massachusetts and Maryland. Although a clandestine gathering of Federalist members of Congress had nominated Pinckney in February, the Federalist electors were formally unpledged. Manning J. Dauer argues that the uncertainty surrounding the identity of the Federalist nominees contributed to the party's poor showing in the election.

== General election ==
=== Summary ===
New Hampshire chose 7 electors on a statewide general ticket. Nineteenth-century election laws required voters to elect the members of the Electoral College individually, rather than as a block. This sometimes resulted in small differences in the number of votes cast for electors pledged to the same presidential nominee, if some voters did not vote for all the electors nominated by a party. The following table compares the votes for the leading Democratic-Republican and Federalist electors to give an approximate sense of the statewide popular vote.

1804 United States presidential election in New Hampshire
Party	Candidate	Votes	%
Democratic-Republican	Thomas Jefferson George Clinton	9,088	52.01
Federalist	Unpledged electors	8,386	47.99
Total votes		17,474	100.00

=== Results ===
1804 United States presidential election in New Hampshire
Party	Candidate	Votes
Democratic-Republican	Levi Bartlett	9,088
Democratic-Republican	John Goddard	9,084
Democratic-Republican	Robert Alcock	9,075
Democratic-Republican	William Tarlton	9,072
Democratic-Republican	Timothy Walker	9,048
Democratic-Republican	Jonathan Steele	9,033
Democratic-Republican	George Aldrich	8,995
Federalist	Oliver Peabody	8,386
Federalist	Robert Wallace	8,385
Federalist	William Hale	8,381
Federalist	John Prentiss	8,380
Federalist	Timothy Farrar	8,377
Federalist	Benjamin West	8,368
Federalist	Charles Johnson	8,364
Total votes		≈17,474

=== Results by county ===
This table compares the votes for the leading elector pledged to each ticket by county. It therefore differs slightly from the results summary, which compares the votes for the leading electors statewide.

1804 United States presidential election in New Hampshire
County	Thomas Jefferson Democratic-Republican		Unpledged electors Federalist		Margin		Total
County	Votes	%	Votes	%	Votes	%	Total
Cheshire	1,442	39.12	2,244	60.88	802	-21.76	-3,686
Grafton	696	35.62	1,258	64.38	-562	-28.76	1,954
Hillsborough	2,118	59.15	1,463	40.85	655	18.30	3,581
Rockingham	3,130	64.98	1,687	35.02	1,443	29.96	4,817
Strafford	1,312	49.30	1,349	50.70	-37	-1.40	2,661
TOTAL	8,698	52.09	8,001	47.91	697	4.18%	16,699

== See also ==
- United States presidential elections in New Hampshire

== Bibliography ==
- Dauer, Manning Julian (2002). "Election of 1804". In Schlesinger, Arthur M. Jr.; Israel, Fred L. (eds.). History of American Presidential Elections, 1789–2001. Vol. 1. Philadelphia: Chelsea House Publishers. pp. 159–82.
- Lampi, Philip J. (n.d.). "Electoral College". A New Nation Votes. American Antiquarian Society.
- Lampi, Philip J. (2012). "New Hampshire 1804 Electoral College". A New Nation Votes. American Antiquarian Society.
