= 1804 United States presidential election in Massachusetts =

- November 5, 1804
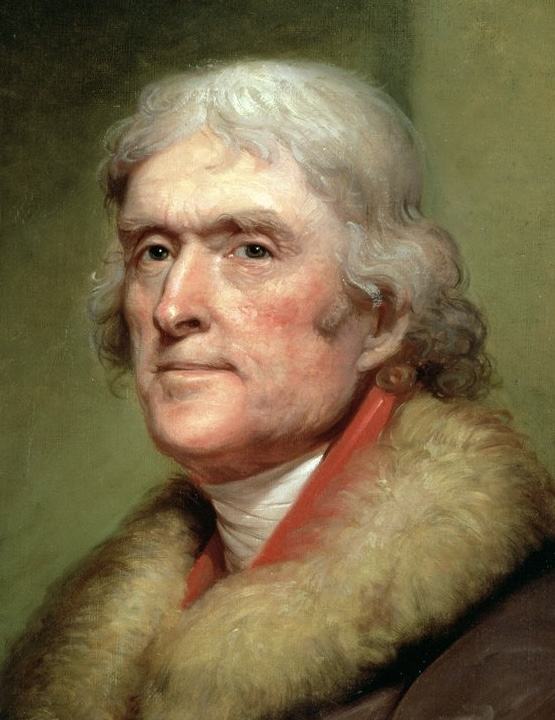

| Nominee | Thomas Jefferson | Unpledged electors |
| Party | Democratic-Republican | Federalist |
| Home state | Virginia | N/A |
| Running mate | George Clinton | N/A |
| Electoral vote | 19 | 0 |
| Popular vote | 29,599 | 25,644 |
| Percentage | 53.1% | 46.0% |
County results
Jefferson
50–60%
60–70%
70–80%
Federalist electors
50–60%
60–70%
70–80%
President before election
Thomas Jefferson
Democratic-Republican
Elected President
Thomas Jefferson
Democratic-Republican

A presidential election was held in Massachusetts on November 5, 1804, as part of the 1804 United States presidential election. The Democratic-Republican Party's ticket of incumbent president Thomas Jefferson and former New York governor George Clinton defeated the Federalist Party's ticket.

Jefferson won the national election in a landslide over the de facto Federalist candidate, Charles Cotesworth Pinckney. Massachusetts was one of three states where electors were chosen by popular vote which the Federalists seriously contested, in addition to Maryland and New Hampshire. Although a clandestine gathering of Federalist members of Congress had nominated Pinckney in February, the Federalist electors in Massachusetts were formally unpledged. The Boston Columbian Centinel, the state's official Federalist publication, denied that the electors were pledged to any candidate prior to the election. Manning J. Dauer attributes the Federalists' defeat in Massachusetts to the uncertainty surrounding the identity of the Federalist nominees.

== General election ==
=== Summary ===
Massachusetts chose 19 electors on a statewide general ticket. Nineteenth-century election laws required voters to elect the members of the Electoral College individually, rather than as a block. This sometimes resulted in small differences in the number of votes cast for electors pledged to the same presidential nominee, if some voters did not vote for all the electors nominated by a party. The following table compares the votes for the leading Democratic-Republican and Federalist electors to give an approximate sense of the statewide popular vote.

1804 United States presidential election in Massachusetts
| Party | Candidate | Votes | % |
|---|---|---|---|
| Democratic-Republican | Thomas Jefferson George Clinton | 29,599 | 53.06 |
| Federalist | Unpledged electors | 25,644 | 45.97 |
| Write-in | | 538 | 0.86 |
| Total votes | | 55,781 | 100.00 |

=== Results ===
1804 United States presidential election in Massachusetts
| Party | Candidate | Votes |
|---|---|---|
| Democratic-Republican | William Heath | 29,599 |
| Democratic-Republican | James Bowdoin III | 29,598 |
| Democratic-Republican | John Davis | 29,597 |
| Democratic-Republican | Josiah Dean | 29,596 |
| Democratic-Republican | Charles Turner Jr. | 29,596 |
| Democratic-Republican | Thomas Kittredge | 29,595 |
| Democratic-Republican | Timothy Newell | 29,595 |
| Democratic-Republican | John Bacon | 29,594 |
| Democratic-Republican | John Farley | 29,594 |
| Democratic-Republican | Thomas Fillebrown | 29,594 |
| Democratic-Republican | John Hathorne | 29,593 |
| Democratic-Republican | Edward Upham | 29,592 |
| Democratic-Republican | John Whiting | 29,592 |
| Democratic-Republican | John Woodman | 29,588 |
| Democratic-Republican | James Winthrop | 29,584 |
| Democratic-Republican | James Warren | 29,573 |
| Democratic-Republican | James Sullivan | 29,572 |
| Democratic-Republican | Elbridge Gerry | 29,507 |
| Democratic-Republican | Jonathan Smith Jr. | 28,966 |
| Federalist | Benjamin Goodhue | 25,644 |
| Federalist | Samuel Wilde | 25,643 |
| Federalist | George Leonard | 25,642 |
| Federalist | John Lord | 25,641 |
| Federalist | William Shepard | 25,641 |
| Federalist | Cotton Tufts | 25,640 |
| Federalist | Bailey Bartlett | 25,640 |
| Federalist | John Coffin Jones Sr. | 25,640 |
| Federalist | David Rosseter | 25,637 |
| Federalist | William Seaver | 25,637 |
| Federalist | Josiah Stearns | 25,636 |
| Federalist | Isaac Parker | 25,635 |
| Federalist | Thomas Rice | 25,629 |
| Federalist | Joseph Allen | 25,628 |
| Federalist | Ebenezer Bacon | 25,627 |
| Federalist | Eleazer Brooks | 25,621 |
| Federalist | Ebenezer Mattoon | 25,585 |
| Federalist | David Cobb | 24,506 |
| Federalist | Oliver Wendell | 24,992 |
| —N/a | William Roach Jr. | 14 |
| —N/a | John Coffin | 3 |
| Federalist | John Read | 2 |
| —N/a | Joshua Thomas | 2 |
| —N/a | Azariah Eggleton | 1 |
| —N/a | Charles Freeman | 1 |
| —N/a | Benjamin Hayward | 1 |
| —N/a | Charles Jarvis | 1 |
| —N/a | Samuel Nye | 1 |
| —N/a | George Partridge | 1 |
| —N/a | Andrew Peters | 1 |
| Federalist | Benjamin Pickman Jr. | 1 |
| —N/a | Daniel Sewall | 1 |
| —N/a | Dummer Sewall | 1 |
| —N/a | Albert Smith | 1 |
| —N/a | David Stearns | 1 |
| —N/a | John Stedman | 1 |
| —N/a | John Treadwell | 1 |
| —N/a | William Walker | 1 |
| —N/a | William Wetmore | 1 |
| —N/a | George Williams | 1 |
| —N/a | James Winslow | 1 |
| Scattering | | 538 |
| Total votes | | ≈55,781 |

=== Results by county ===
This table compares the votes for the leading elector pledged to each ticket by county. It therefore differs slightly from the results summary, which compares the votes for the leading electors statewide.

1804 United States presidential election in Massachusetts
| County | Thomas Jefferson Democratic-Republican | | Unpledged electors Federalist | | Others | | Margin | | Total |
| County | Votes | % | Votes | % | Votes | % | Votes | % | Total |
|---|---|---|---|---|---|---|---|---|---|
| Barnstable | 724 | 64.13 | 403 | 35.70 | 2 | 0.18 | 321 | 28.43 | 1,129 |
| Berkshire | 2,146 | 58.47 | 1,520 | 41.42 | 4 | 0.11 | 626 | 17.05 | 3,670 |
| Bristol | 1,729 | 64.54 | 939 | 35.05 | 11 | 0.41 | 790 | 29.49 | 2,679 |
| Cumberland | 1,171 | 46.75 | 1,321 | 52.73 | 13 | 0.52 | -150 | -45.98 | 2,505 |
| Dukes | 60 | 37.27 | 101 | 62.73 | — | | -41 | -25.46 | 161 |
| Essex | 3,196 | 47.70 | 3,060 | 45.67 | 444 | 6.63 | 136 | 2.03 | 6,700 |
| Hampshire | 2,545 | 33.12 | 5,121 | 66.64 | 18 | 0.23 | -2,576 | -33.52 | 7,684 |
| Hancock | 649 | 71.24 | 260 | 28.54 | 2 | 0.22 | 389 | 42.70 | 911 |
| Kennebec | 1,813 | 66.05 | 931 | 33.92 | 1 | 0.04 | 882 | 32.13 | 2,745 |
| Lincoln | 1,070 | 51.94 | 987 | 47.91 | 3 | 0.14 | 83 | 4.03 | 2,060 |
| Middlesex | 3,636 | 68.63 | 1,647 | 31.09 | 15 | 0.28 | 1,989 | 37.54 | 5,298 |
| Nantucket | 176 | 79.64 | 45 | 20.36 | — | | 131 | 59.28 | 221 |
| Norfolk | 2,031 | 67.21 | 980 | 32.43 | 11 | 0.36 | 1,051 | 34.78 | 3,022 |
| Plymouth | 2,036 | 63.13 | 1,188 | 36.84 | 1 | 0.03 | 848 | 26.29 | 3,225 |
| Suffolk | 1,585 | 40.64 | 2,298 | 58.92 | 17 | 0.44 | -713 | -18.28 | 3,900 |
| Washington | 82 | 27.99 | 210 | 71.67 | 1 | 0.34 | -128 | -43.68 | 293 |
| Worcester | 2,943 | 43.70 | 3,774 | 56.04 | 18 | 0.27 | -831 | -12.34 | 6,735 |
| York | 2,012 | 69.67 | 866 | 29.99 | 10 | 0.35 | 1,146 | 39.68 | 2,888 |
| TOTAL | 29,604 | 53.03 | 25,651 | 45.95 | 571 | 1.02 | 3,953 | 7.08 | 55,826 |

== See also ==
- United States presidential elections in Massachusetts

== Bibliography ==
- Dauer, Manning Julian (2002). "Election of 1804". In Schlesinger, Arthur M. Jr.; Israel, Fred L. (eds.). History of American Presidential Elections, 1789–2001. Vol. 1. Philadelphia: Chelsea House Publishers. pp. 159–82.
- Lampi, Philip J. (n.d.). "Electoral College". A New Nation Votes. American Antiquarian Society.
- Lampi, Philip J. (2012). "Massachusetts 1804 Electoral College". A New Nation Votes. American Antiquarian Society.
