= 1804 United States presidential election =

Re-election of Thomas Jefferson

- November 1 – December 4, 1804

176 members of the Electoral College 89 electoral votes needed to win
- Turnout: 23.8% (▼8.5 pp)
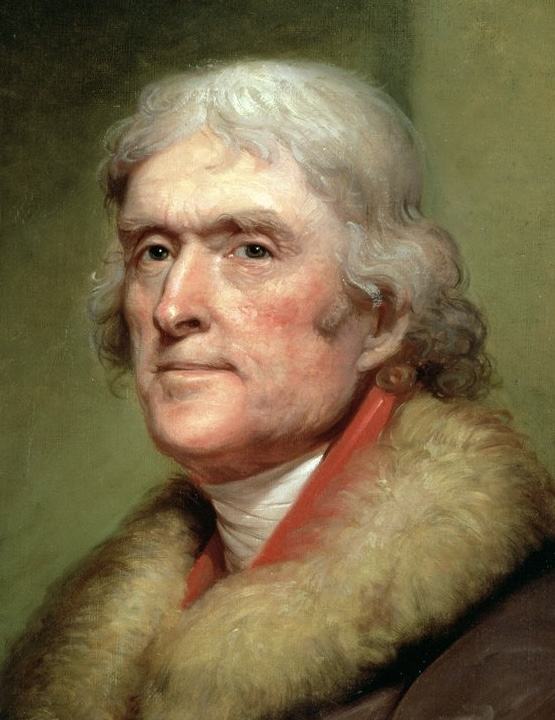

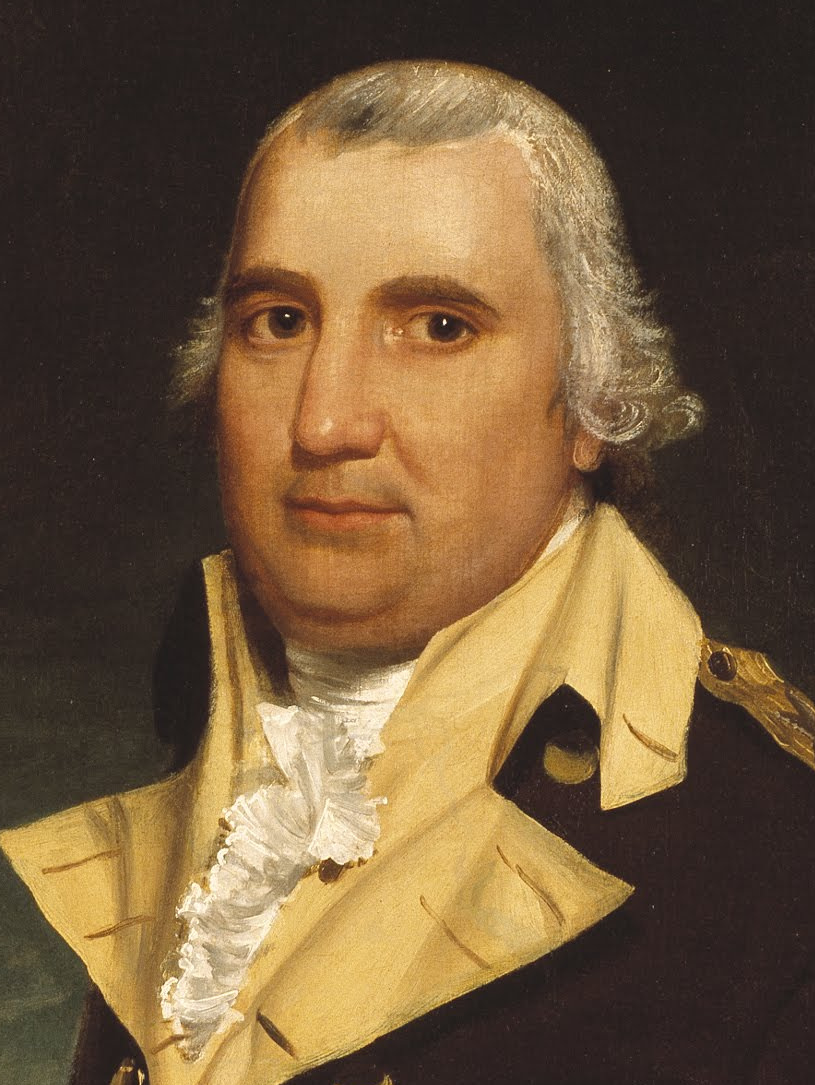
Nominee	Thomas Jefferson	Charles Cotesworth Pinckney
Party	Democratic-Republican	Federalist
Home state	Virginia	South Carolina
Running mate	George Clinton	Rufus King
Electoral vote	162	14
States carried	15	2
Popular vote	106,786	39,245 (Note: Votes for Federalist unpledged electors.)
Percentage	72.8%	26.8%
- Presidential election results map. Green denotes states won by Jefferson/Clinton, and salmon denotes states won by Pinckney/King. Numbers indicate the number of electoral votes cast by each state.
President before election
Thomas Jefferson
Democratic-Republican
Elected President
Thomas Jefferson
Democratic-Republican

A presidential election was held in the United States from November 1 to December 4, 1804. The Democratic-Republican Party's ticket of incumbent president Thomas Jefferson and former New York governor George Clinton defeated the Federalist Party's ticket of former U.S. minister to France Charles Cotesworth Pinckney and former U.S. minister to the United Kingdom Rufus King. This was the first election held under the Twelfth Amendment to the United States Constitution, which required separate ballots for president and vice president.

Jefferson was unanimously renominated by his party's congressional nominating caucus in February; the caucus selected Clinton to succeed the outgoing vice president, Aaron Burr. A "semisecret" Federalist caucus elevated Pinckney and King as the party's national candidates; while news of the caucus was widely circulated, in states where electors were chosen by popular vote, the Federalist ticket was formally unpledged. Federalists in several states chose not to nominate electors, resulting in a lopsided popular vote margin for Jefferson.

Jefferson was widely popular and considered unbeatable by many observers, following his narrow election four years earlier. Economic prosperity, the expansion of voting rights, and the disorganized state of the opposition all benefited his campaign. The Federalists portrayed Jefferson as a demagogue for his embrace of populist, democratic politics, and a dictator for his use of patronage and reforms to the federal judiciary. Jefferson's complicity in slavery did little to damage his candidacy even in New England, where he carried the Federalist stronghold of Massachusetts.

Jefferson won the election in a landslide, carrying every state and all but two electoral districts where electors were chosen by popular vote. Pinckney received the electoral votes of Connecticut and Delaware, where electors were appointed by the legislature, and two votes from unpledged electors in Maryland. Jefferson polled more than 106,000 popular votes, representing 73 percent of the total, compared with fewer than 40,000 votes for the Federalist electors.

== Background ==
Incumbent Federalist president John Adams sought re-election in 1800, but was defeated by Democratic-Republican challenger Thomas Jefferson. Jefferson's running mate, Aaron Burr, was elected vice president following a contingent election in the United States House of Representatives.

=== Suffrage ===
The right to vote was widespread in the United States during the Early Republic, including the large majority of adult white men. Roughly 80 percent of adult white men were eligible to vote in the late 1780s; suffrage requirements varied dramatically by state, with roughly 60 percent of adult white men eligible to vote in New York and Virginia versus around 90 percent in Georgia, New Hampshire, New Jersey, North Carolina, and Pennsylvania. The expansion of voting rights during Jefferson's first term included the establishment of universal white male suffrage in Maryland in 1801. Propertied, single women retained the right to vote in New Jersey, while Black men who met all other property and taxpaying requirements were eligible in New England, New Jersey, New York, North Carolina, Pennsylvania, and Tennessee.

In most places, voting was by secret ballot. (Kentucky and Virginia retained the English custom of oral voting.) Eligible individuals voted using paper tickets, typically handwritten, listing the voter's choice for the various offices. Enforcement of property and taxpaying qualifications was generally lax, in part due to the frequency of land sales, which outpaced officials' ability to keep accurate records of ownership. In other cases, local opinion or the threat of rioting might compel election officials to permit veterans and small landholders to vote when otherwise disenfranchised by state law.

=== Twelfth Amendment ===
Congress passed the Twelfth Amendment to the United States Constitution, which was ratified by the states prior to the election. The Amendment instructed the United States Electoral College to elect the president and vice president on separate ballots. Previously, electors voted for two presidential candidates, with the runner-up in the presidential election becoming vice president; this system produced a tied vote in the 1800 United States presidential election, resulting in a protracted contest between Jefferson and Burr in the House of Representatives. The Federalists opposed ratifying the Amendment, hoping to exploit the original electoral system to sow discord in the Democratic-Republican ranks. During the campaign, some Federalists encouraged the Democratic-Republican electors from New York to support Clinton for president over Jefferson. Efforts to delay ratification of the Amendment were unsuccessful, and the new system took effect in September 1804 in time for the election.

== Nominations ==
=== Democratic-Republican Party ===
==== Caucus ====
Jefferson faced no internal opposition to his bid for re-election; the Democratic-Republican congressional caucus nominated him unanimously on February 25. The outgoing vice president, Aaron Burr, was not a candidate in the caucus, following his controversial role in the 1801 contingent election; Burr himself had anticipated that he would not be re-selected as Jefferson's running mate, and was instead focused on an ultimately unsuccessful campaign to become governor of New York. With Burr out of the running, the selection of the vice-presidential candidate was the caucus's main responsibility.

George Clinton and John Breckinridge were the leading contenders for the vice presidential nomination. Clinton had served as governor of New York for most of the last thirty years and was a veteran of the American Revolutionary War; he had received 50 electoral votes in the 1792 United States presidential election, and declined a place on the Democratic-Republican ticket in 1800. Although of advanced age, his political views aligned with Jefferson's, and he remained popular with Democratic-Republicans in his home state.

Breckinridge, a Kentuckian, was the choice of Western Democratic-Republicans concerned with regional representation. Other candidates included the U.S. attorney general, Levi Lincoln Sr.; the former U.S. senator from New Hampshire, John Langdon; and the U.S. postmaster general, Gideon Granger. Thomas McKean was discussed as a possible contender, but withdrew prior to the caucus.

The caucus was attended by 110 Democratic-Republican members of Congress. Clinton won the nomination with 67 votes.

==== Nominees ====
Democratic-Republican Party 1804 Democratic-Republican Party ticket
Thomas Jefferson	George Clinton
for President	for Vice President
3rd President of the United States (1801–09)	1st Governor of New York (1777–95, 1801–04)

==== Vice presidential candidates ====
Candidates in this section are sorted by vote count in the caucus
John Breckinridge	Levi Lincoln Sr.	John Langdon	Gideon Granger	William Maclay	Thomas McKean
U.S. Senator from Kentucky (1801–05)	4th U.S. Attorney General (1801–05)	New Hampshire Representative (1801–05)	U.S. Postmaster General (1801–14)	Pennsylvania Representative (1803–04)	2nd Governor of Pennsylvania (1799–1808)
LN: February 25; 20 votes	LN: February 25; 9 votes	LN: February 25; 7 votes	LN: February 25; 4 votes	LN: February 25; 1 vote	W: before February 25; 0 votes

=== Federalist Party ===
==== Caucus ====
Congressional Federalists did not meet formally to nominate a ticket, as they had done in the previous election. The party was ill-prepared to mount a national campaign, and few believed Jefferson could be defeated. Instead, a "semisecret caucus" in Washington proposed Pinckney and King as the party's national candidates on February 22. Although this meeting was widely reported, significant uncertainty persisted concerning the identities of the Federalist candidates throughout the campaign. In states where electors were chosen by popular vote, the Federalist electors remained formally unpledged. Pinckney's biographer states that Pinckney "had the dubious honor of being the least publicized candidate in the brief history of American presidential party elections." The nomination of the inoffensive but otherwise unremarkable southerner, who did little to appeal to voters outside his own region, amounted to a public admission of Jefferson's invincibility.

==== Nominees ====
Federalist Party 1804 Federalist Party ticket
Charles Cotesworth Pinckney	Rufus King
for President	for Vice President
6th U.S. Minister to France (1796–97)	3rd U.S. Minister to the United Kingdom (1796–1803)

== Campaign issues ==
=== Campaigns ===
==== Jefferson's campaign ====
The Democratic-Republicans established a vast network of state, county, town, and ward committees to conduct the campaign. In states such as Ohio, the overriding importance of the presidential election was an agent of party unity. Democratic-Republicans organized celebrations to commemorate the anniversary of Jefferson's first inauguration on March 4 and the Louisiana Purchase on May 11. Parades, dinners, and toasting were the mainstays of such events. Supporters sang campaign songs such as "Jefferson and Liberty," written to commemorate the last election. Democratic-Republican militia units, professional associations, benevolent societies, and partisan groups like the Young Men of Democratic Principles were visible supporters of the president's re-election campaign. The Democratic-Republicans made effective use of the partisan press. The party's national paper, the National Intelligencer, was widely circulated and supported a vast array of state and local print publications.

The Democratic-Republican campaign catered to the nation's developing white male democracy. The abandonment of property requirements for voting in Maryland and New Jersey benefited Jefferson, whose economic policies were considered favorable to working people. Democratic-Republican newspapers and broadsides were written in plain language accessible to the average person. The themes of "simplicity and frugality" and equality of opportunity were central to the party's appeal to voters, contrasted against Federalist elitism.

==== Federalist campaign ====
In contrast to the Democratic-Republicans, the Federalists entered the campaign demoralized and to some degree leaderless. Pinckney displayed little interest in the election and devoted most of 1804 to a local campaign against dueling. The party lost its most influential leader in July, when Alexander Hamilton was killed in a duel by the outgoing vice president, Burr. Hamilton's former deputy, Timothy Pickering, saw no hope for the presidential election and instead advocated for New England to secede from the United States. Other Federalists simply withdrew from politics rather than endure a seemingly inevitable defeat.

A few Federalists, such as James A. Bayard, advocated for the party to update its tactics. The growth of mass politics in the early nineteenth century made the Federalists' reliance on elite relationships increasingly obsolete. Federalists held celebrations on the anniversary of Washington's birthday and organized groups like the Washington Benevolent Societies. The effectiveness of the party press was hindered by the stilted, formal style of many Federalist newspapers.

Criticism of Jefferson, rather than enthusiasm for Pinckney, characterized the Federalist campaign. In states where the party nominated electors, its ticket was formally unpledged. The Federalist press generally avoided mention of Pinckney and King; the Boston Columbian Centinel denied that the Federalist electors were pledged to Pinckney. Manning J. Dauer argues that the uncertainty surrounding the Federalist ticket cost the party the electoral votes of Massachusetts.

=== Attacks on Jefferson ===
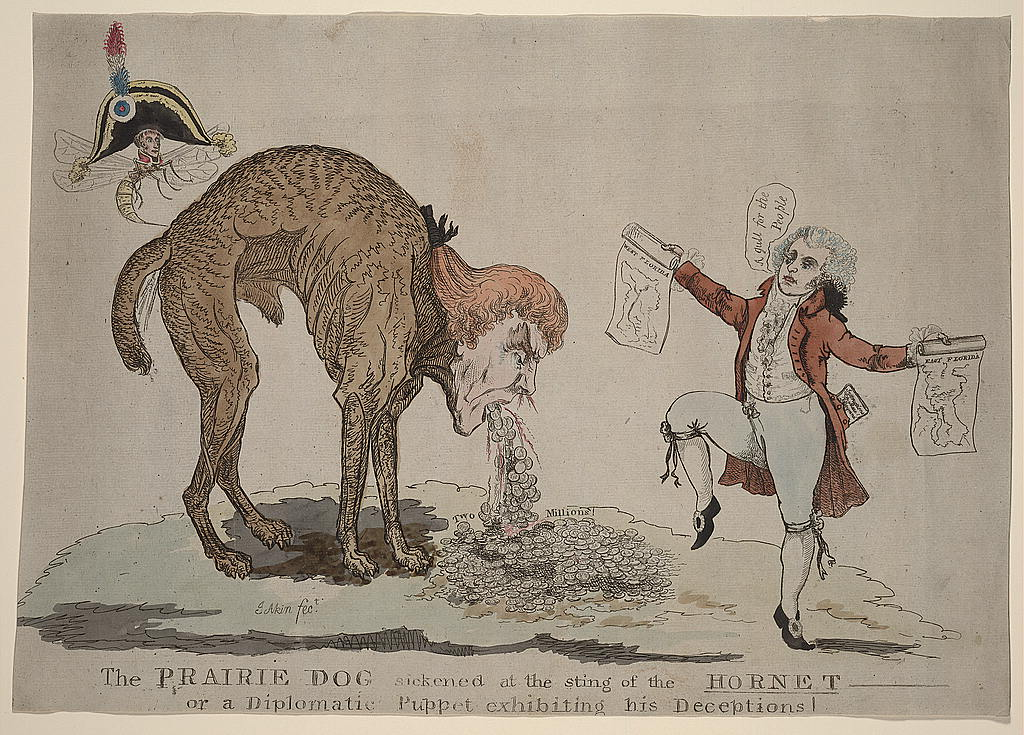
An anti-Jefferson political cartoon (1804) by James Akin criticizes the Louisiana Purchase.

==== Allegations of despotism ====
The Federalists described Jefferson as an aspiring dictator. They compared the Louisiana Purchase to Napoleon's European conquests and accused Jefferson of violating the Constitution, which did not specify the president's power to acquire new territory. Federalists alleged parallels between Jefferson's administration and the rule of European tyrants, including Napoleon, Maximilien Robespierre, and Julius Caesar. Jefferson's use of patronage and the impeachment of Samuel Chase by the House of Representatives in March 1804 were criticized by Federalists who feared Jefferson's growing influence over the political system. They portrayed the repeal of the Midnight Judges Act and the reduction of the United States Armed Forces as attempts to dismantle the federal government of the United States.

==== Jefferson–Hemings controversy ====
Jefferson's sexual relationship with Sally Hemings, an enslaved woman and the half-sister of his late wife, Martha Jefferson, was first exposed by James T. Callender in 1802. Jefferson had six children with Hemings between 1795 and 1808, although some historians argue their relationship began much earlier, during Jefferson's tenure as the U.S. minister to France. Federalists seized on the scandal to attack Jefferson's hypocrisy and personal character. Partisan journals printed doggerel mocking Jefferson's promiscuity with verses that emphasized Hemings's race and complexion. In pillorying Jefferson as an enslaver, Federalist writers did not intend to critique social inequality; instead, they sought to use Jefferson's complicity in slavery to discredit democratic politics.

==== Religion ====
The Federalists attacked Jefferson's religious views, which they described as atheism. Federalist ministers characterized the Democratic-Republican Party as a grave threat to Christianity. Jefferson's first election was seen by these leaders as the impetus for freethought, profanity, and non-observance of the Sabbath, among other "national iniquities."

=== Economy ===
Jefferson's economic policies catered to the interests of free men and entrepreneurs, in contrast to Federalist policies that prioritized wealthy creditors. Joyce Appleby argues that Jefferson's laissez-faire posture facilitated commercial expansion that benefited white men regardless of class. Whereas the Federalists used economic regulation to promote the interests of creditors, Democratic-Republicans favored a decentralized economy in which opportunities to participate in commerce were more broadly accessible. The Federalists interpreted Democratic-Republican policies as an attack on elite privilege and defended the principle of economic inequality. Although many Democratic-Republicans were skeptical of national corporations, corporations and banks flourished at the state and local level. Jefferson considered the political support of the merchant class essential to his economic program, writing that "a merchant is naturally a Republican, and can be otherwise only from a vitiated state of things."

=== Slavery ===
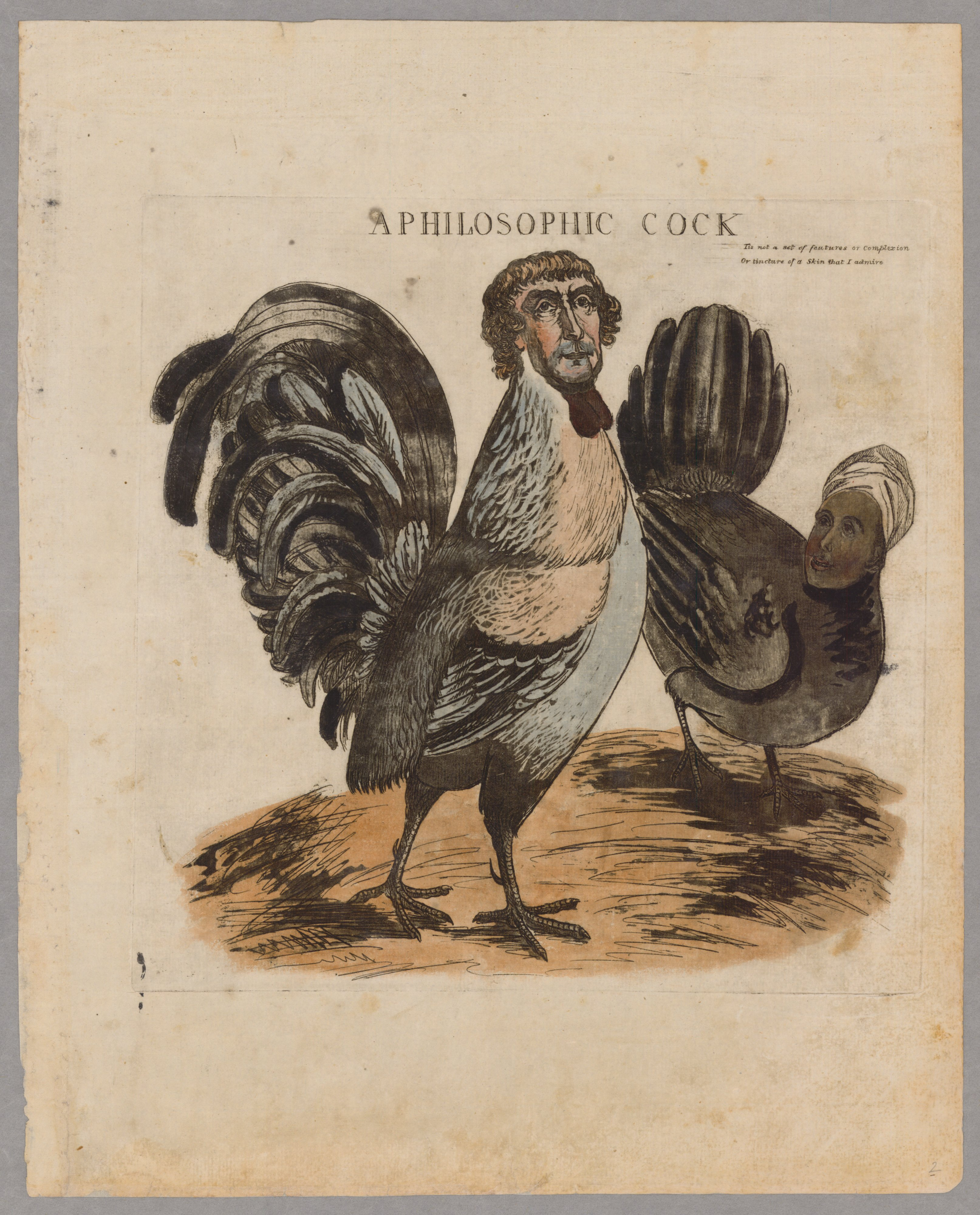
An anti-Jefferson political cartoon (1804) by James Akin refers to the Jefferson–Hemings controversy.

Both Jefferson and Pinckney were enslavers. Pinckney played a critical role in the adoption of the Three-Fifths Clause by the Constitutional Convention and opposed the efforts to end the Atlantic slave trade. Jefferson criticized slavery in print, but did little either privately or politically to diminish it; as president, he withheld diplomatic recognition from the First Empire of Haiti, the first independent state in the Americas established as the result of a successful slave rebellion.

Federalists attempted to make slavery an issue in New England, with limited success. Both national parties sought to avoid discussion of slavery during the 1790s; after 1801, the decline of the Federalist Party in the Southern United States freed Northern Federalists to attack slavery more directly. Antislavery rhetoric featured in some Federalists' critiques of the Louisiana Purchase. New England Federalists demanded the repeal of the Three-Fifths Clause, which disadvantaged the region in terms of congressional apportionment. These appeals largely failed to motivate opposition to Jefferson, while accompanying calls for secession met with little popular support.

Criticism of the Three-Fifths Clause emphasized New England Federalists' partisan self-interest. Many Federalists blamed this provision for their defeat in the last election. Fisher Ames wrote that "black votes" had elected Jefferson in 1800 and that the administration therefore lacked a popular mandate. New England Federalists frequently pointed to prominent Democratic-Republicans' complicity in slavery as evidence of the party's hypocrisy. Opposing political rights for both white and Black workers, they pointed to the contradictions in Jeffersonian democracy as proof that a political system based on mass participation was unworkable.

== Results ==
Election Day by state: November 1–3, 1804: November 1–2, 1804; November 3, 1804; November 4–10, 1804: November 4, 1804; November 5, 1804; November 6–7, 1804; November 8–9, 1804; November 11–17, 1804: November 12, 1804; November 14, 1804; November 18–24, 1804: November 21, 1804; November 25–December 5, 1804: December 4, 1804

Jefferson won the election in a landslide, carrying every state and all but two districts where electors were chosen by popular vote. Federalists appeared to win the popular vote on Election Day in North Carolina's Fayetteville district, but the exclusion of the return from Montgomery County, North Carolina, subsequently gave the district's single electoral vote to Jefferson. Jefferson carried Massachusetts and New Hampshire, as well as seven of nine Maryland districts. In Pennsylvania, Jefferson carried every county except Adams, where a last-minute Federalist effort narrowly succeeded in keeping the county out of the Democratic-Republican column. Ohio Federalists' attempt to split the Democratic-Republican Party was unsuccessful, and the Jefferson electors defeated the Federalist ticket by a wide margin. The Federalists did not contest the remaining popular vote states, but unpledged electors received write-in votes in New Jersey and Virginia. Pinckney received electoral votes from Connecticut and Delaware, where electors were chosen by the state legislature, while Jefferson swept the remaining states for a total of 162 electoral votes.

As of 2024, Jefferson was the first of eight presidential nominees to win a significant number of electoral votes in at least three elections, the others being Henry Clay, Andrew Jackson, Grover Cleveland, William Jennings Bryan, Franklin D. Roosevelt, Richard Nixon, and Donald Trump. Of these, Jackson, Cleveland, and Roosevelt also won the popular vote in at least three elections. Jefferson, Cleveland, Roosevelt, and Trump were also their respective party's nominees for three consecutive elections.

=== Electoral results ===
Electoral results
Presidential candidate	Party	Home state	Popular vote^{(a)}^{(b)}		Electoral vote	Running mate		
Presidential candidate	Party	Home state	Count	Percentage	Electoral vote	Vice-presidential candidate	Home state	Electoral vote
Thomas Jefferson (incumbent)	Democratic-Republican	Virginia	106,786	72.84%	162	George Clinton	New York	162
Charles Cotesworth Pinckney	Federalist	South Carolina	^{(c)}	^{(c)}	14	Rufus King	New York	14
Unpledged electors	Federalist	(n/a)	39,245	26.77%	—^{(d)}	(n/a)	(n/a)	—^{(d)}
Other			569	0.39%	—	Other		—
Total			146,600	100%	176			176
Needed to win					89			89

Source: A New Nation Votes: American Election Returns 1787–1825

- a. In six states, electors were chosen by the legislature rather than by popular vote. The 11 states where electors were chosen via popular vote had widely varying restrictions on suffrage.
- b. Popular vote figures from North Carolina and Tennessee are incomplete.
- c. In states where electors were chosen by popular vote, the Federalist ticket was formally unpledged.
- d. Unpledged electors carried two Maryland districts; these electors voted for Pinckney and King.

Popular vote
Jefferson	72.8%
Unpledged electors	26.8%
Others	0.4%

Electoral vote
Jefferson	92.0%
Pinckney	8.0%

=== Results by state ===
Nineteenth-century election laws required voters to elect the members of the Electoral College individually, rather than as a block. This sometimes resulted in small differences in the number of votes cast for electors pledged to the same presidential nominee, if some voters did not vote for all the electors nominated by a party. In most cases, this table compares the votes for the most popular elector on each ticket. In the single-member districts in Maryland, North Carolina, and Tennessee, the result is the sum of all votes for electors pledged to one nominee. In Virginia, where several distinct anti-Jefferson tickets ran in different parts of the state, the result shown is the sum of the votes for the leading electors in each county.

State or district	E.V.	Thomas Jefferson Democratic-Republican			Unpledged electors (Note: The Federalist electors voted for Charles Cotesworth Pinckney.) Federalist			Other		Margin		Total	Cit.
State or district	E.V.	Votes	%	E.V.	Votes	%	E.V.	Votes	%	Votes	%	Total	Cit.
Connecticut	9	*		—	*		9	*		*		—	
Delaware	3	*		—	*		3	*		*		—	
Georgia	6	*		6	*		—	*		*		—	
Kentucky–Northern	4	2,827	100.00	4	—		—	—		2,827	100.00	2,827	
Kentucky–Southern	4	2,253	100.00	4	—		—	—		2,253	100.00	2,253	
Maryland–1	1	239	27.82	—	620	72.18	1	—		-381	-44.36	859	
Maryland–2	1	498	98.61	1	3	0.59	—	4	0.79	495	98.02	505	
Maryland–3	2	1,038	99.33	2	3	0.29	—	4	0.38	1,035	99.04	1,045	
Maryland–4	2	2,370	99.29	2	6	0.25	—	11	0.46	2,364	99.04	2,387	
Maryland–5	1	276	99.28	1	2	0.72	—	—		274	98.56	278	
Maryland–6	1	668	99.55	1	—		—	3	0.45	668	99.55	671	
Maryland–7	1	602	100.00	1	—		—	—		602	100.00	602	
Maryland–8	1	793	82.95	1	163	17.05	—	—		630	65.90	956	
Maryland–9	1	995	39.69	—	1,512	60.31	1	—		-517	-20.62	2,507	
Massachusetts	19	29,599	53.06	19	25,644	45.97	—	538	0.86	3,955	7.09	55,781	
New Hampshire	7	9,088	52.01	7	8,386	47.99	—	—		702	4.02	17,474	
New Jersey	8	13,119	99.86	8	19	0.14	—	—		13,100	99.72	13,138	
New York	19	*		19	*		—	*		*		—	
North Carolina–1	1	**		1	**		—	**		**		**	
North Carolina–2	1	**		1	**		—	**		**		**	
North Carolina–3 (Note: Incomplete returns.)	1	481	100.00	1	—		—	—		481	100.00	481	
North Carolina–4	1	**		1	**		—	**		**		**	
North Carolina–5	1	**		1	**		—	**		**		**	
North Carolina–6	1	**		1	**		—	**		**		**	
North Carolina–7	1	**		1	**		—	**		**		**	
North Carolina–8 (Note: Including rejected votes from Montgomery County, North Carolina. Three electors pledged to Jefferson and one unpledged elector ran in this single-member district. The votes from Montgomery County were excluded from the official count, with the result that the leading Jefferson elector carried the district with 492 votes; the unpledged elector received 461 votes, and the other Jefferson electors received 450 votes and 380 votes, respectively.)	1	1,511 (Note: Including votes for one Federalist elector pledged to Jefferson.)	70.94	1	619	29.06	—	—		892	41.88	2,130	
North Carolina–9	1	**		1	**		—	**		**		**	
North Carolina–10 (Note: Including rejected votes from Martin County, North Carolina. These votes were excluded from the official count, with the result that Jefferson carried the district with 481 votes to Pinckney's 25 votes.)	1	489	47.75	1	535	52.24	—	—		-46	-4.49	1,024	
North Carolina–11	1	**		1	**		—	**		**		**	
North Carolina–12	1	**		1	**		—	**		**		**	
North Carolina–13	1	**		1	**		—	**		**		**	
North Carolina–14 (Note: Incomplete returns. Including rejected votes from Franklin County, North Carolina.)	1	97	98.98	1	1	1.02	—	—		96	97.96	98	
Ohio	3	2,593	87.69	3	364	12.31	—	—		2,229	75.38	2,957	
Pennsylvania	20	22,081	94.69	20	1,239	5.31	—	—		20,842	89.38	23,320	
Rhode Island	4	1,312	100.00	4	—		—	—		1,312	100.00	1,312	
South Carolina	10	*		10	*		—	*		*		—	
Tennessee–1	1	**		1	**		—	**		**		**	
Tennessee–2	1	**		1	**		—	**		**		**	
Tennessee–3	1	**		1	**		—	**		**		**	
Tennessee–4	1	**		1	**		—	**		**		**	
Tennessee–5	1	943	100.00	1	—		—	—		943	100.00	943	
Vermont	6	*		6	*		—	*		*		—	
Virginia	24	12,914 (Note: Including votes for William H. Cabell as an elector on the Democratic-Republican ticket.)	98.94	24	129 (Note: Including votes for William H. Cabell as an elector on the Federalist ticket.)	0.99	—	9	0.07	12,785	97.95	13,052	
TOTAL	176	106,786	72.84%	162	39,245	26.77%	14	569	0.39%	67,541	46.07%	146,600	

==== States and districts that flipped from Federalist to Democratic-Republican ====
- Massachusetts
- Maryland–2
- Maryland–3
- Maryland–10
- New Hampshire
- New Jersey
- North Carolina–4
- North Carolina–7
- North Carolina–8
- North Carolina–10
- Rhode Island
- Vermont

=== Close states and districts ===
States and districts where the margin of victory was between 1 and 5 percentage points (8 electoral votes; all won by Jefferson after the exclusion of returns from Martin County, North Carolina, favoring Pinckney):

1. New Hampshire, 4.02% (702 votes) – 7 electoral votes
2. North Carolina's 10th electoral district, 4.49% (46 votes) – 1 electoral vote

States where the margin of victory was between 5 and 10 percentage points (19 electoral votes; all won by Jefferson):

1. Massachusetts, 7.09% (3,955 votes) – 19 electoral votes

=== Maps ===
Popular vote by state

Popular vote by county

Popular vote by electoral district

== Electoral College selection ==
Method of choosing electors	State(s)
Each elector appointed by the state legislature	Connecticut; Delaware; Georgia; New York; South Carolina; Vermont
Each elector chosen by voters statewide	Massachusetts; New Hampshire; New Jersey; Ohio; Pennsylvania; Rhode Island; Virginia
State divided into single-member districts, with each elector chosen by the voters of that district	North Carolina; Tennessee
State divided into seven single-member districts and two plural districts represented by two electors, with each elector chosen by the voters of that district.	Maryland
State divided into plural districts, with four electors chosen by the voters of each district.	Kentucky

== See also ==
- Bibliography of Thomas Jefferson
- History of the United States (1789–1849)
- Second inauguration of Thomas Jefferson
- 1804–05 United States House of Representatives elections
- 1804–05 United States Senate elections

== Bibliography ==
- Appleby, Joyce (2003). Thomas Jefferson. New York: Times Books.
- Broussard, James H. (1978). The Southern Federalists, 1800–1816. Baton Rouge: Louisiana State University Press.
- Evans, Eldon Cobb (1917). A History of the Australian Ballot System in the United States. Chicago: University of Chicago Press.
- Dauer, Manning Julian (2002). "Election of 1804". In Schlesinger, Arthur M. Jr.; Israel, Fred L. (eds.). History of American Presidential Elections, 1789–2001. Vol. 1. Philadelphia: Chelsea House Publishers. pp. 159–82.
- Higginbotham, Sanford W. (1952). The Keystone in the Democratic Arch: Pennsylvania Politics, 1800–1816. Harrisburg: Pennsylvania Historical and Museum Commission.
- King, Charles R., ed. (1897). The Life and Correspondence of Rufus King [...]. New York: G. P. Putnam's Sons.
- Klinghoffer, Judith Apter; Elkis, Lois (Summer 1992). "'The Petticoat Electors': Women's Suffrage in New Jersey, 1776–1807". Journal of the Early Republic. 12 (2): 159–93.
- Mason, Matthew (2006). Slavery and Politics in the Early American Republic. Chapel Hill: University of North Carolina Press.
- Morgan, William G. (April 17, 1969). "The Origin and Development of the Congressional Nominating Caucus". Proceedings of the American Philosophical Society. 113 (2): 184–96.
- Ratcliffe, Donald J. (1998). Party Spirit in a Frontier Republic: Democratic Politics in Ohio, 1793–1821. Columbus: Ohio State University Press.
- Ratcliffe, Donald J. (Summer 2013). "The Right to Vote and the Rise of Democracy, 1787–1828". Journal of the Early Republic. 33 (2): 219–54.
- Schoening, Benjamin S.; Kasper, Eric T. (2012). Don't Stop Thinking about the Music: The Politics of Songs and Musicians in Presidential Campaigns. Lanham, MD: Lexington Books.
- Zahniser, Marvin R. (1967). Charles Cotesworth Pinckney: Founding Father. Chapel Hill: University of North Carolina Press.
