= 1804 United States presidential election in North Carolina =

- November 8–9, 1804
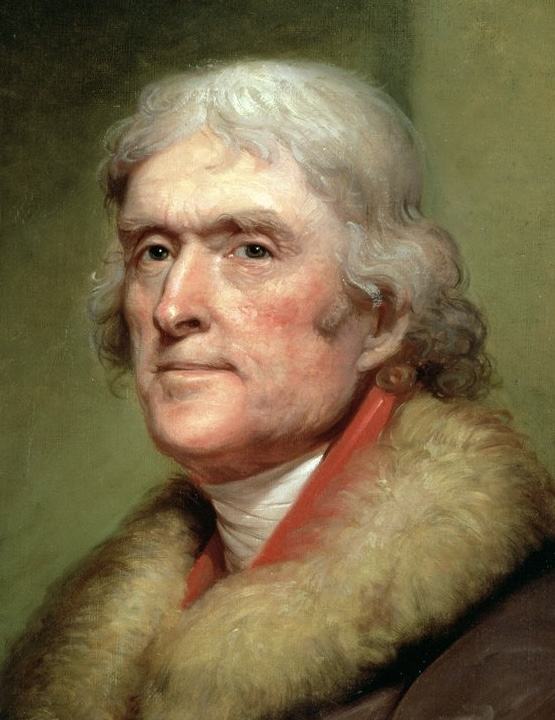

Nominee	Thomas Jefferson	Unpledged electors
Party	Democratic-Republican	Federalist
Home state	Virginia	N/A
Running mate	George Clinton	N/A
Electoral vote	14	0
Popular vote	2,578	1,155
Percentage	69.1%	30.9%
County results
Jefferson
50–60%
60–70%
80–90%
90–100%
Federalist electors
50–60%
90–100%
No data
President before election
Thomas Jefferson
Democratic-Republican
Elected President
Thomas Jefferson
Democratic-Republican

A presidential election was held in North Carolina on November 8 and 9, 1804, as part of the 1804 United States presidential election. The Democratic-Republican Party's ticket of incumbent president Thomas Jefferson and former New York governor George Clinton defeated the Federalist Party's ticket in the state's 14 electoral districts.

Jefferson won the national election in a landslide over the de facto Federalist candidate, Charles Cotesworth Pinckney. Although a clandestine gathering of Federalist members of Congress had nominated Pinckney in February, the Federalist electors were formally unpledged. In two districts, Federalists won the popular vote on Election Day, but the exclusion of votes from Martin and Montgomery counties gave both districts to Jefferson. The narrow margin in the former Federalist stronghold of Fayetteville, North Carolina, indicated the party's decline in the state.

== General election ==
=== Summary ===
North Carolina chose 14 electors from as many single-member districts. Complete returns are available for the 8th and 10th electoral districts; returns from the remaining districts are either incomplete or missing. Nineteenth-century election laws required voters to elect the members of the Electoral College individually, rather than as a block. This sometimes resulted in small differences in the number of votes cast for electors pledged to the same presidential nominee, if some voters did not vote for all the electors nominated by a party. The following table calculates the sum of all votes for electors pledged to Jefferson and for unpledged Federalist electors to give an approximate sense of the statewide popular vote.

1804 United States presidential election in North Carolina
Party	Candidate	Votes	%
Democratic-Republican	Thomas Jefferson George Clinton	2,578	69.06
Federalist	Unpledged electors	1,155	30.94
Total votes		3,733	100.00

=== Results by district ===
District	E.V.	Thomas Jefferson Democratic-Republican			Unpledged electors Federalist			Margin		Total
District	E.V.	Votes	%	E.V.	Votes	%	E.V.	Votes	%	Total
North Carolina–1	1	**		1	**		—	**		**
North Carolina–2	1	**		1	**		—	**		**
North Carolina–3 (Note: Incomplete returns.)	1	481	100.00	1	—		—	481	100.00	481
North Carolina–4	1	**		1	**		—	**		**
North Carolina–5	1	**		1	**		—	**		**
North Carolina–6	1	**		1	**		—	**		**
North Carolina–7	1	**		1	**		—	**		**
North Carolina–8 (Note: Including rejected votes from Montgomery County, North Carolina. Three electors pledged to Jefferson and one unpledged elector ran in this single-member district. The votes from Montgomery County were excluded from the official count, with the result that the leading Jefferson elector carried the district with 492 votes; the unpledged elector received 461 votes, and the other Jefferson electors received 450 votes and 380 votes, respectively.)	1	1,511 (Note: Including votes for one Federalist elector pledged to Jefferson.)	70.94	1	619	29.06	—	892	41.88	2,130
North Carolina–9	1	**		1	**		—	**		**
North Carolina–10 (Note: Including rejected votes from Martin County, North Carolina. These votes were excluded from the official count, with the result that Jefferson carried the district with 481 votes to Pinckney's 25 votes.)	1	489	47.75	1	535	52.24	—	-46	-4.49	1,024
North Carolina–11	1	**		1	**		—	**		**
North Carolina–12	1	**		1	**		—	**		**
North Carolina–13	1	**		1	**		—	**		**
North Carolina–14 (Note: Incomplete returns. Including rejected votes from Franklin County, North Carolina.)	1	97	98.98	1	1	1.02	—	96	97.96	98
TOTAL	14	2,578	69.06	14	1,155	30.94	0	1,423	38.12	3,733

==== District 1 ====
Returns from this district appear to be lost. Felix Walker, a Democratic-Republican, was elected.

==== District 2 ====
Returns from this district appear to be lost. Peter Forney, a Democratic-Republican, was elected.

==== District 3 ====
Returns from Stokes and Surry counties appear to be lost. Joseph Williams, a Democratic-Republican, was elected.

1804 United States presidential election in North Carolina's 3rd electoral district
Party	Candidate	Votes	%
Democratic-Republican	Joseph Williams	130	27.03
Democratic-Republican	John Brown	351	72.97
Total votes		481	100.00

==== District 4 ====
Returns from this district appear to be lost. Montfort Stokes, a Democratic-Republican, was elected.

==== District 5 ====
Returns from this district appear to be lost. Solomon Graves, a Democratic-Republican, was elected.

==== District 6 ====
Returns from this district appear to be lost. Joseph Taylor, a Democratic-Republican, was elected.

==== District 7 ====
Returns from this district appear to be lost. Joseph J. Alston, a Democratic-Republican, was elected.

==== District 8 ====
Two Democratic-Republicans, one Federalist pledged to Jefferson, and one unpledged Federalist ran in this single-member district. The Federalist unpledged elector, John Culpepper, received the most votes on Election Day based on votes from Montgomery County.

1804 United States presidential election in North Carolina's 8th electoral district: provisional
Party	Candidate	Votes	%
Federalist	John Culpepper (Note: Unpledged elector)	619	29.06
Democratic-Republican	Isaac Lanier	535	25.12
Democratic-Republican	Robert Cochran	504	23.66
Federalist	Allen Gilchrist (Note: Pledged to Thomas Jefferson)	472	22.16
Total votes		2,130	100.00

The votes from Montgomery County were excluded from the official returns, flipping the district. Robert Cochran, a Democratic-Republican, was elected.

1804 United States presidential election in North Carolina's 8th electoral district: official
Party	Candidate	Votes	%
Democratic-Republican	Robert Cochran	492	27.59
Federalist	John Culpepper	461	25.86
Federalist	Allen Gilchrist	450	25.24
Democratic-Republican	Isaac Lanier	380	21.31
Total votes		1,783	100.00

==== District 9 ====
Returns from this district appear to be lost. Lemuel Sawyer, a Democratic-Republican, was elected.

==== District 10 ====
John B. Hunter, a Federalist, received the most votes on Election Day based on votes from Martin County.

1804 United States presidential election in North Carolina's 10th electoral district: provisional
Party	Candidate	Votes	%
Federalist	John B. Hunter	535	52.24
Democratic-Republican	James Jones	489	47.75
Total votes		1,024	100.00

The votes from Martin County were excluded from the official returns, flipping the district. James Jones, a Democratic-Republican, was elected.

1804 United States presidential election in North Carolina's 10th electoral district: official
Party	Candidate	Votes	%
Democratic-Republican	James Jones	481	95.06
Federalist	John B. Hunter	25	4.94
Total votes		506	100.00

==== District 11 ====
Returns from this district appear to be lost. Reading Blount, a Democratic-Republican, was elected.

==== District 12 ====
Returns from this district appear to be lost. Bryan Whitfield, a Democratic-Republican, was elected.

==== District 13 ====
Returns from this district appear to be lost. Samuel Ashe, a Democratic-Republican, was elected.

==== District 14 ====
Returns from Halifax, Nash, and Warren counties appear to be lost. Gideon Alston, a Democratic-Republican, received the most votes on Election Day based on votes from Franklin County.

1804 United States presidential election in North Carolina's 14th electoral district: provisional
Party	Candidate	Votes	%
Democratic-Republican	Gideon Alston	95	96.94
Democratic-Republican	George Tunstall	2	2.04
Federalist	Stephen W. Carney	1	1.02
Total votes		98	100.00

The votes from Franklin County were excluded from the official returns. The exclusion did not change the result in the district, and Alston was elected.

=== Results by county ===
County	D	Thomas Jefferson Democratic-Republican		Unpledged electors Federalist		Margin		Total
County	D	Votes	%	Votes	%	Votes	%	Total
Anson	8	284	49.13	294	50.86	-10	-1.73	578
Ashe	3	93	100.00	—		93	100.00	93
Beaufort	11	**		**		**		**
Bertie	10	195	89.45	23	10.55	172	78.90	218
Bladen	13	**		**		**		**
Brunswick	13	**		**		**		**
Buncombe	1	**		**		**		**
Burke	1	**		**		**		**
Cabarrus	4	**		**		**		**
Camden	9	**		**		**		**
Carteret	12	**		**		**		**
Caswell	5	**		**		**		**
Chatham	7	**		**		**		**
Chowan	9	**		**		**		**
Craven	12	**		**		**		**
Cumberland	8	524	90.34	56	9.66	468	80.68	580
Currituck	9	**		**		**		**
Duplin	13	**		**		**		**
Edgecombe	11	**		**		**		**
Franklin	14	97	98.98	1	1.02	96	97.96	98
Gates	9	**		**		**		**
Granville	6	**		**		**		**
Greene	12	**		**		**		**
Guilford	5	**		**		**		**
Halifax	14	**		**		**		**
Hertford	10	58	98.30	1	1.69	57	96.61	59
Hyde	11	**		**		**		**
Iredell	2	**		**		**		**
Johnston	6	**		**		**		**
Jones	12	**		**		**		**
Lenoir	12	**		**		**		**
Lincoln	2	**		**		**		**
Martin	10	8	1.54	510	98.46	-502	-98.43	518
Mecklenburg	2	**		**		**		**
Montgomery	8	189	54.47	158	45.53	31	8.94	347
Moore	7	**		**		**		**
Nash	14	**		**		**		**
New Hanover	13	**		**		**		**
Northampton	10	128	99.22	1	0.78	127	98.45	129
Onslow	13	**		**		**		**
Orange	7	**		**		**		**
Pasquotank	9	**		**		**		**
Perquimans	9	**		**		**		**
Person	5	**		**		**		**
Pitt	11	**		**		**		**
Randolph	4	**		**		**		**
Richmond	8	173	64.31	96	35.69	77	28.62	269
Robeson	8	341	95.79	15	4.21	326	91.57	356
Rockingham	5	**		**		**		**
Rowan	4	**		**		**		**
Rutherford	1	**		**		**		**
Sampson	13	**		**		**		**
Stokes	3	**		**		**		**
Surry	3	**		**		**		**
Tyrrell	11	**		**		**		**
Wake	6	**		**		**		**
Warren	14	**		**		**		**
Washington	11	**		**		**		**
Wayne	12	**		**		**		**
Wilkes	3	388	100.00	—		388	100.00	388
TOTAL		2,578	69.06	1,155	30.94	1,423	38.12	3,733

== See also ==
- United States presidential elections in North Carolina

== Bibliography ==
- Broussard, James H. (1978). The Southern Federalists, 1800–1816. Baton Rouge: Louisiana State University Press.
- Dauer, Manning Julian (2002). "Election of 1804". In Schlesinger, Arthur M. Jr.; Israel, Fred L. (eds.). History of American Presidential Elections, 1789–2001. Vol. 1. Philadelphia: Chelsea House Publishers. pp. 159–82.
- Lampi, Philip J. (n.d.). "Electoral College". A New Nation Votes. American Antiquarian Society.
- Lampi, Philip J. (2012a). "North Carolina 1804 Electoral College, District 1". A New Nation Votes. American Antiquarian Society.
- Lampi, Philip J. (2012b). "North Carolina 1804 Electoral College, District 2". A New Nation Votes. American Antiquarian Society.
- Lampi, Philip J. (2012c). "North Carolina 1804 Electoral College, District 3". A New Nation Votes. American Antiquarian Society.
- Lampi, Philip J. (2012d). "North Carolina 1804 Electoral College, District 4". A New Nation Votes. American Antiquarian Society.
- Lampi, Philip J. (2012e). "North Carolina 1804 Electoral College, District 5". A New Nation Votes. American Antiquarian Society.
- Lampi, Philip J. (2012f). "North Carolina 1804 Electoral College, District 6". A New Nation Votes. American Antiquarian Society.
- Lampi, Philip J. (2012g). "North Carolina 1804 Electoral College, District 7". A New Nation Votes. American Antiquarian Society.
- Lampi, Philip J. (2012h). "North Carolina 1804 Electoral College, District 8". A New Nation Votes. American Antiquarian Society.
- Lampi, Philip J. (2012i). "North Carolina 1804 Electoral College, District 9". A New Nation Votes. American Antiquarian Society.
- Lampi, Philip J. (2012j). "North Carolina 1804 Electoral College, District 10". A New Nation Votes. American Antiquarian Society.
- Lampi, Philip J. (2012k). "North Carolina 1804 Electoral College, District 11". A New Nation Votes. American Antiquarian Society.
- Lampi, Philip J. (2012l). "North Carolina 1804 Electoral College, District 12". A New Nation Votes. American Antiquarian Society.
- Lampi, Philip J. (2012m). "North Carolina 1804 Electoral College, District 13". A New Nation Votes. American Antiquarian Society.
- Lampi, Philip J. (2012n). "North Carolina 1804 Electoral College, District 14". A New Nation Votes. American Antiquarian Society.
