= 1804 United States presidential election in Maryland =

- November 12, 1804
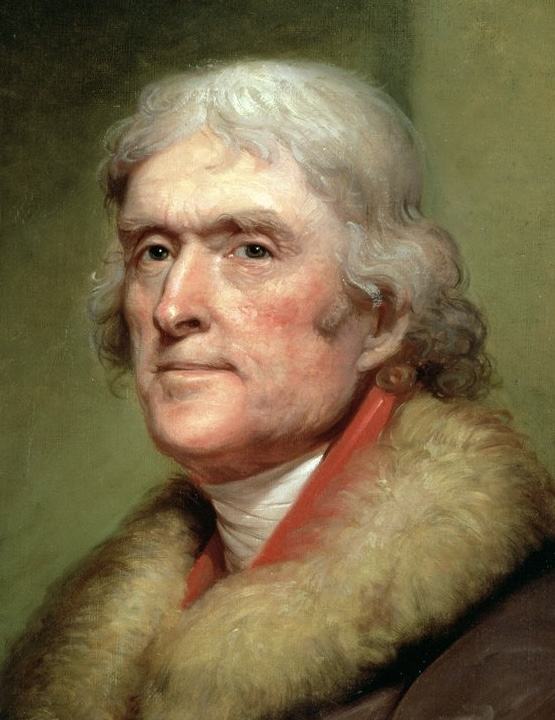

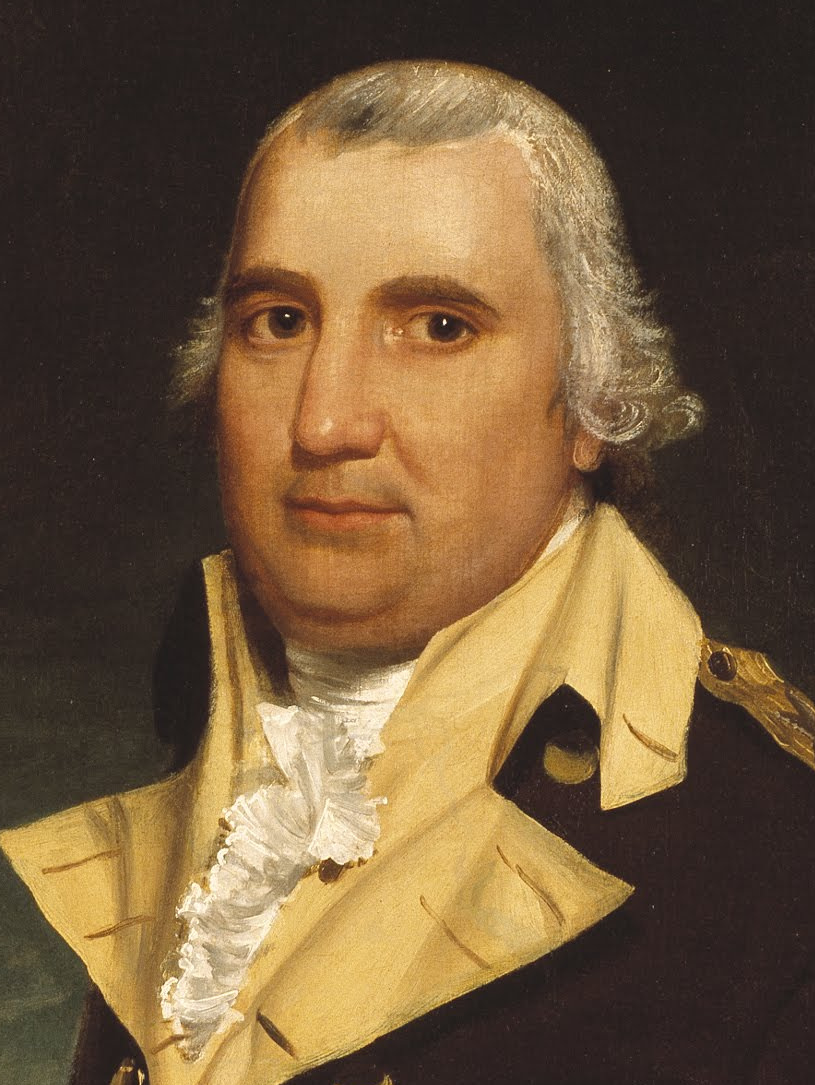
Nominee	Thomas Jefferson	Charles Cotesworth Pinckney (by unpledged electors)
Party	Democratic-Republican	Federalist
Home state	Virginia	South Carolina
Running mate	George Clinton	Rufus King (by unpledged electors)
Electoral vote	9	2
Popular vote	7,479	2,309
Percentage	76.24%	23.54%
County results
Jefferson
60–70%
70–80%
80–90%
90–100%
Federalist electors
50–60%
60–70%
70–80%
President before election
Thomas Jefferson
Democratic-Republican
Elected President
Thomas Jefferson
Democratic-Republican

A presidential election was held in Maryland on November 12, 1804, as part of the 1804 United States presidential election. The Democratic-Republican Party's ticket of incumbent president Thomas Jefferson and former New York governor George Clinton carried seven electoral districts, choosing nine electors. The Federalist Party carried the remaining districts, choosing two electors who voted for the former U.S. minister to France, Charles C. Pinckney, and the former U.S. minister to Great Britain, Rufus King.

Jefferson won the national election in a landslide over Pinckney, who received electoral votes from Connecticut and Delaware, in addition to the two Maryland districts. Maryland was one of three states where electors were chosen by popular vote which the Federalists seriously contested. Although a clandestine gathering of Federalist members of Congress had nominated Pinckney in February, the Federalist electors were formally unpledged. The defeat of the Federalist ticket in Massachusetts and New Hampshire made Maryland's two Federalist districts the only popular vote constituencies to oppose Jefferson's re-election.

== Results ==
=== Summary ===
Maryland chose 11 electors from nine electoral districts—seven single-member districts and two plural districts electing two electors each. Nineteenth-century election laws required voters to elect the members of the Electoral College individually, rather than as a block. This sometimes resulted in small differences in the number of votes cast for electors pledged to the same presidential nominee, if some voters did not vote for all the electors nominated by a party. The following table calculates the sum of all votes in the single-member districts and the votes for the leading Democratic-Republican and Federalist candidates in each plural district to give an approximate sense of the statewide popular vote.

1804 United States presidential election in Maryland
Party	Candidate	Votes	%
Democratic-Republican	Thomas Jefferson George Clinton	7,479	76.24
Federalist	Unpledged electors	2,309	23.54
Write-in		22	0.22
Total votes		9,810	100.00

=== Results by district ===
1804 United States presidential election in Maryland by district
District	E.V.	Thomas Jefferson Democratic-Republican			Unpledged electors (Note: The Federalist electors voted for Charles Cotesworth Pinckney.) Federalist			Other		Margin		Total
District	E.V.	Votes	%	E.V.	Votes	%	E.V.	Votes	%	Votes	%	Total
Maryland–1	1	239	27.82	—	620	72.18	1	—		-381	-44.36	859
Maryland–2	1	498	98.61	1	3	0.59	—	4	0.79	495	98.02	505
Maryland–3	2	1,038	99.33	2	3	0.29	—	4	0.38	1,035	99.04	1,045
Maryland–4	2	2,370	99.29	2	6	0.25	—	11	0.46	2,364	99.04	2,387
Maryland–5	1	276	99.28	1	2	0.72	—	—		274	98.56	278
Maryland–6	1	668	99.55	1	—		—	3	0.45	668	99.55	671
Maryland–7	1	602	100.00	1	—		—	—		602	100.00	602
Maryland–8	1	793	82.95	1	163	17.05	—	—		630	65.90	956
Maryland–9	1	995	39.69	—	1,512	60.31	1	—		-517	-20.62	2,507
TOTAL	11	7,479	76.24	9	2,309	23.54	2	22	0.22	5,171	52.70	9,810

==== District 1 ====
1804 United States presidential election in Maryland's 1st electoral district
Party	Candidate	Votes	%
Federalist	John Parnham	620	72.18
Democratic-Republican	John Mitchell	239	27.82
Total votes		859	100.00

==== District 2 ====
1804 United States presidential election in Maryland's 2nd electoral district
Party	Candidate	Votes	%
Democratic-Republican	John Wilkinson	498	98.61
	Richard Grayson	2	0.40
Federalist	John Lamb	1	0.20
	Henry W. C. Robertson	1	0.20
Federalist	Samuel Thomas	1	0.20
Federalist	Edward Calvert	1	0.20
	Richard Marshall	1	0.20
Total votes		505	100.00

==== District 3 ====
1804 United States presidential election in Maryland's 3rd electoral district
Party	Candidate	Votes	%
Democratic-Republican	John Johnson Sr.	1,038	48.35
Democratic-Republican	Edward Johnson	623	29.02
Democratic-Republican	George Keeport	474	22.08
Democratic-Republican	John Francis Mercer	3	1.40
Federalist	Robert Goodloe Harper (Note: Ran as a ticket with Philip Barton Key.)	2	0.09
Federalist	Philip Barton Key (Note: Ran as a ticket with Robert Goodloe Harper.)	2	0.09
	John Purivance	2	0.09
	Thomas Johnson	1	0.05
	John Stricker	1	0.05
Federalist	Thomas Davis	1	0.05
Total votes		2,147 (Note: Voters selected up to two candidates in this plural district; consequently, the number of votes is approximately double the number of voters.)	100.00

==== District 4 ====
1804 United States presidential election in Maryland's 4th electoral district
Party	Candidate	Votes	%
Democratic-Republican	John Tyler	2,370	49.77
Democratic-Republican	Frisby Tilghman	2,369	49.75
Federalist	Elias Eckhard (Note: Ran as a ticket with Edmund Boyd.)	6	0.12
Federalist	Edmund Boyd (Note: Ran as a ticket with Elias Eckhard.)	6	0.12
	J. Thayer	6	0.12
	Philip Thomas	2	0.04
	Richard Potts	1	0.02
	William C. Hobbs	1	0.02
	Jonathan Harper	1	0.02
Total votes		4,762	100.00

==== District 5 ====
1804 United States presidential election in Maryland's 5th electoral district
Party	Candidate	Votes	%
Democratic-Republican	Tobias E. Stansbury	276	99.28
Federalist	Charles Carnan Ridgely	2	0.72
Total votes		278	100.00

==== District 6 ====
1804 United States presidential election in Maryland's 6th electoral district
Party	Candidate	Votes	%
Democratic-Republican	John Gilpin	668	99.55
	William Howell	1	0.15
	Israel Reynolds	1	0.15
	Caleb Johnson	1	0.15
Total votes		671	100.00

==== District 7 ====
1804 United States presidential election in Maryland's 7th electoral district
Party	Candidate	Votes	%
Democratic-Republican	William Gleaves	427	70.93
Democratic-Republican	Samuel T. Wright	175	29.07
Total votes		602	100.00

==== District 8 ====
1804 United States presidential election in Maryland's 8th electoral district
Party	Candidate	Votes	%
Democratic-Republican	Perry Spencer	793	82.95
Federalist	William Frazier	163	17.05
Total votes		956	100.00

==== District 9 ====
1804 United States presidential election in Maryland's 9th electoral district
Party	Candidate	Votes	%
Federalist	Ephraim King Wilson	1,512	60.31
Democratic-Republican	Peter Dashiell	995	39.69
Total votes		2,507	100.00

=== Results by county ===
In counties where voters selected more than one elector, this table compares the votes for the leading elector pledged to each ticket by county and county subdivision. It therefore differs slightly from the state and district tables, which compare the votes for the leading electors by district.

1804 United States presidential election in Maryland by county
County	D	Thomas Jefferson Democratic-Republican		Unpledged electors Federalist		Other		Margin		Total
County	D	Votes	%	Votes	%	Votes	%	Votes	%	Total
Allegany	4	236	97.52	6	2.48	—		230	95.04	242
Anne Arundel	3	248	99.20	—		2	0.80	246	98.40	250
Baltimore	5	276	99.28	2	0.72	—		274	98.56	278
Baltimore City	3	758	99.60	2	0.26	1	0.13	756	99.34	761
Calvert	1	221	99.55	1	0.45	—		220	99.10	222
Caroline	8	287	92.28	24	7.72	—		263	84.56	311
Cecil	6	238	99.17	—		2	0.83	236	98.34	240
Charles	1	118	24.08	372	75.92	—		-254	-51.84	490
Dorchester	8	132	80.98	31	19.02	—		101	61.96	163
Dorchester	9	49	19.01	208	80.93	—		159	61.92	257
Frederick	4	1,523	99.74	—		4	0.26	1,519	99.48	1,527
Harford	6	430	99.77	—		1	0.23	429	99.54	431
Kent	7	315	100.00	—		—		315	100.00	315
Montgomery	2	50	96.15	1	1.92	1	1.92	49	94.23	52
Montgomery	3	32	96.97	1	3.03	—		31	93.94	33
Prince George's	1	15	32.61	31	67.39	—		-16	-34.78	46
Prince George's	2	227	98.27	1	0.43	3	1.30	226	97.84	231
Queen Anne's	7	287	100.00	—		—		287	100.00	287
St. Mary's	1	106	32.82	217	67.18%	—		-111	-34.36	323
Somerset	9	259	31.13	573	68.87	—		-314	-37.74	832
Talbot	8	374	77.59	108	22.41	—		266	55.18	482
Washington	4	612	99.67	—		2	0.33	610	99.34	614
Worcester	9	687	48.45	731	51.55	—		-44	-3.10	1,418
TOTAL		7,480	76.28	2,309	23.55	16	0.16	5,171	52.74	9,805

==== Counties that flipped from Federalist to Democratic-Republican ====
- Allegany
- Calvert
- Frederick
- Montgomery
- Prince George's

== See also ==
- United States presidential elections in Maryland
- 1804 United States presidential election
- 1804 United States elections

== Bibliography ==
- Dauer, Manning Julian (2002). "Election of 1804". In Schlesinger, Arthur M. Jr.; Israel, Fred L. (eds.). History of American Presidential Elections, 1789–2001. Vol. 1. Philadelphia: Chelsea House Publishers. pp. 159–82.
- Lampi, Philip J. (n.d.). "Electoral College". A New Nation Votes. American Antiquarian Society.
- Lampi, Philip J. (2012a). "Maryland 1804 Electoral College, District 1". A New Nation Votes. American Antiquarian Society.
- Lampi, Philip J. (2012b). "Maryland 1804 Electoral College, District 2". A New Nation Votes. American Antiquarian Society.
- Lampi, Philip J. (2012c). "Maryland 1804 Electoral College, District 3". A New Nation Votes. American Antiquarian Society.
- Lampi, Philip J. (2012d). "Maryland 1804 Electoral College, District 4". A New Nation Votes. American Antiquarian Society.
- Lampi, Philip J. (2012e). "Maryland 1804 Electoral College, District 5". A New Nation Votes. American Antiquarian Society.
- Lampi, Philip J. (2012f). "Maryland 1804 Electoral College, District 6". A New Nation Votes. American Antiquarian Society.
- Lampi, Philip J. (2012g). "Maryland 1804 Electoral College, District 7". A New Nation Votes. American Antiquarian Society.
- Lampi, Philip J. (2012h). "Maryland 1804 Electoral College, District 8". A New Nation Votes. American Antiquarian Society.
- Lampi, Philip J. (2012i). "Maryland 1804 Electoral College, District 9". A New Nation Votes. American Antiquarian Society.
