= List of presidents of the United States who won reelection =

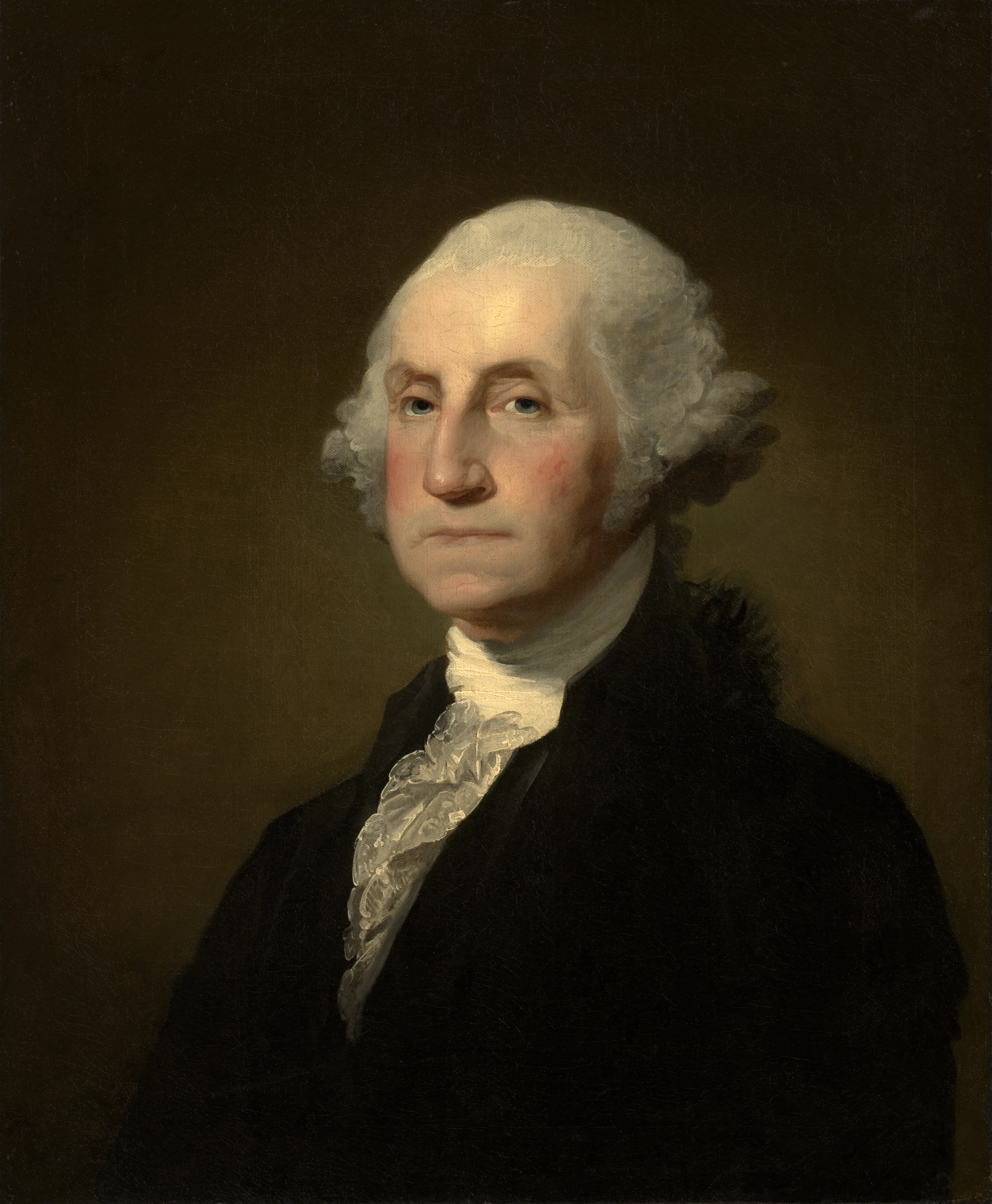
George Washington is the first president to have won a re-election.

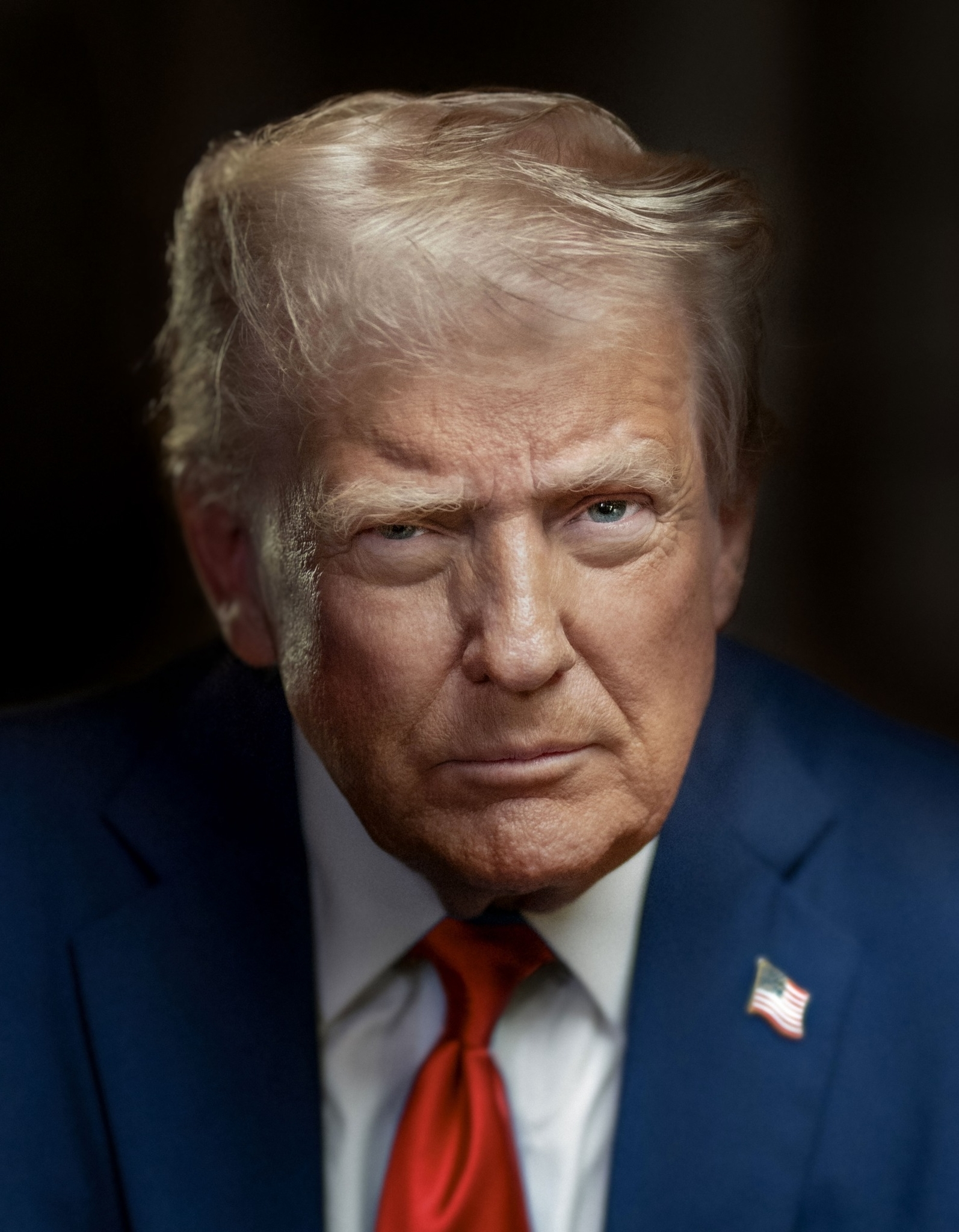
Grover Cleveland and Donald Trump are the only presidents to have won a nonconsecutive reelection.
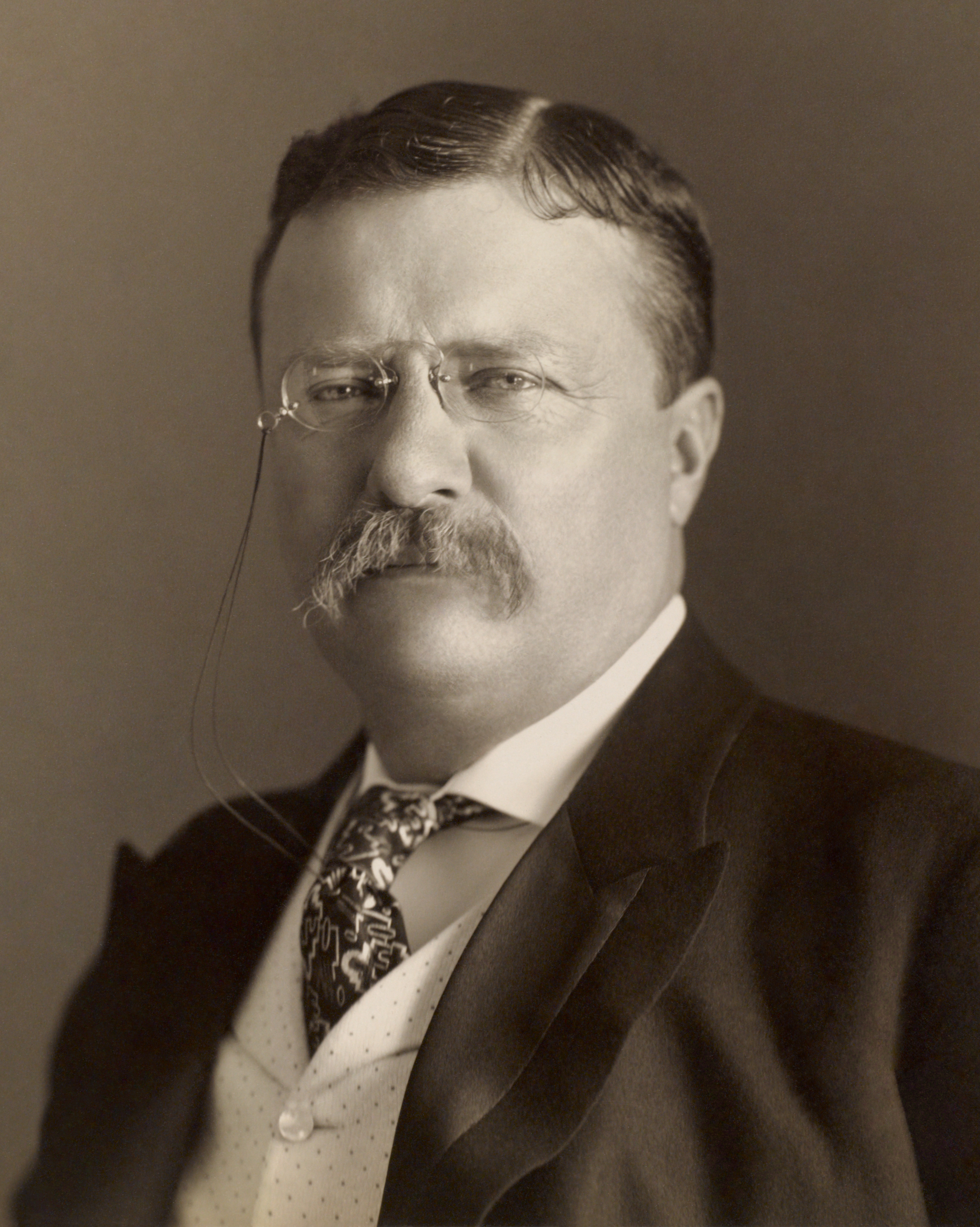
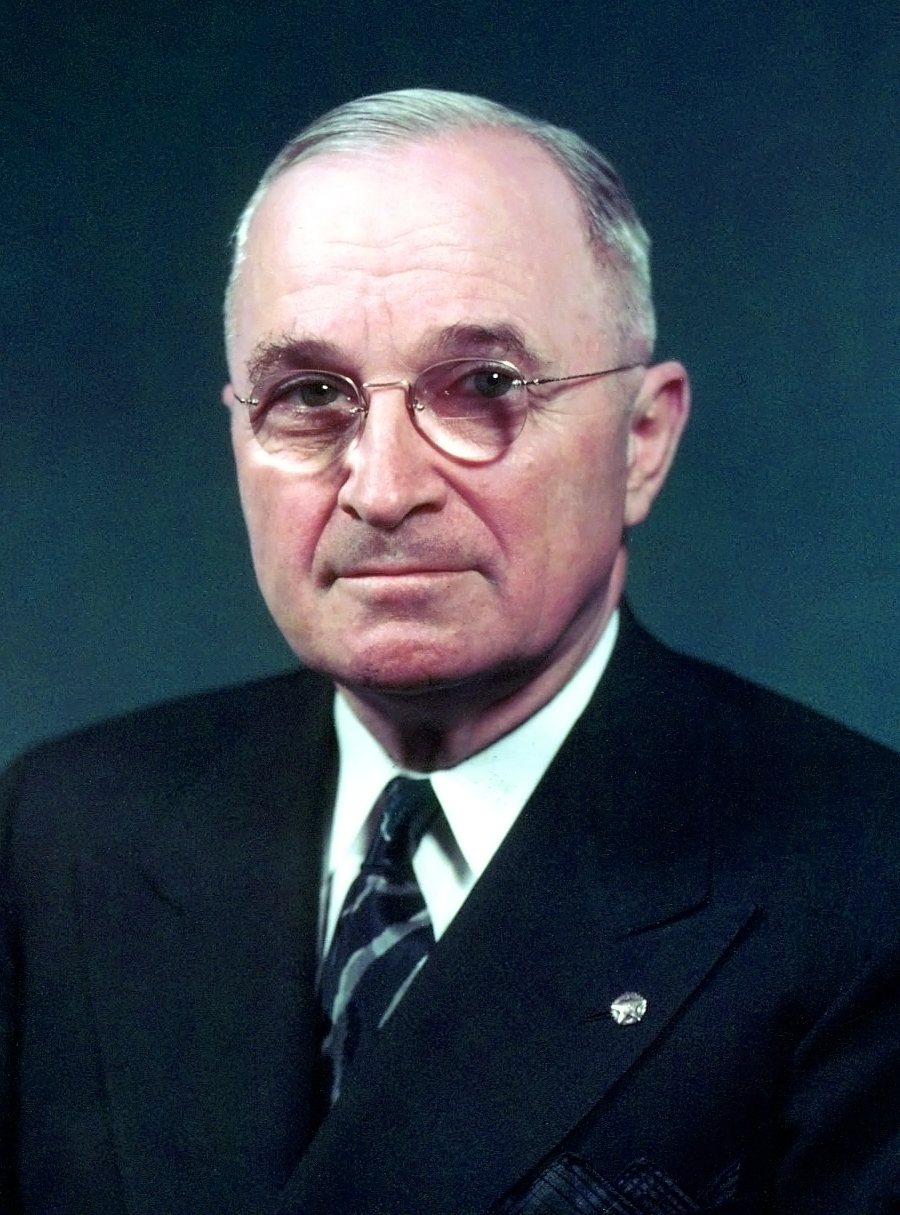
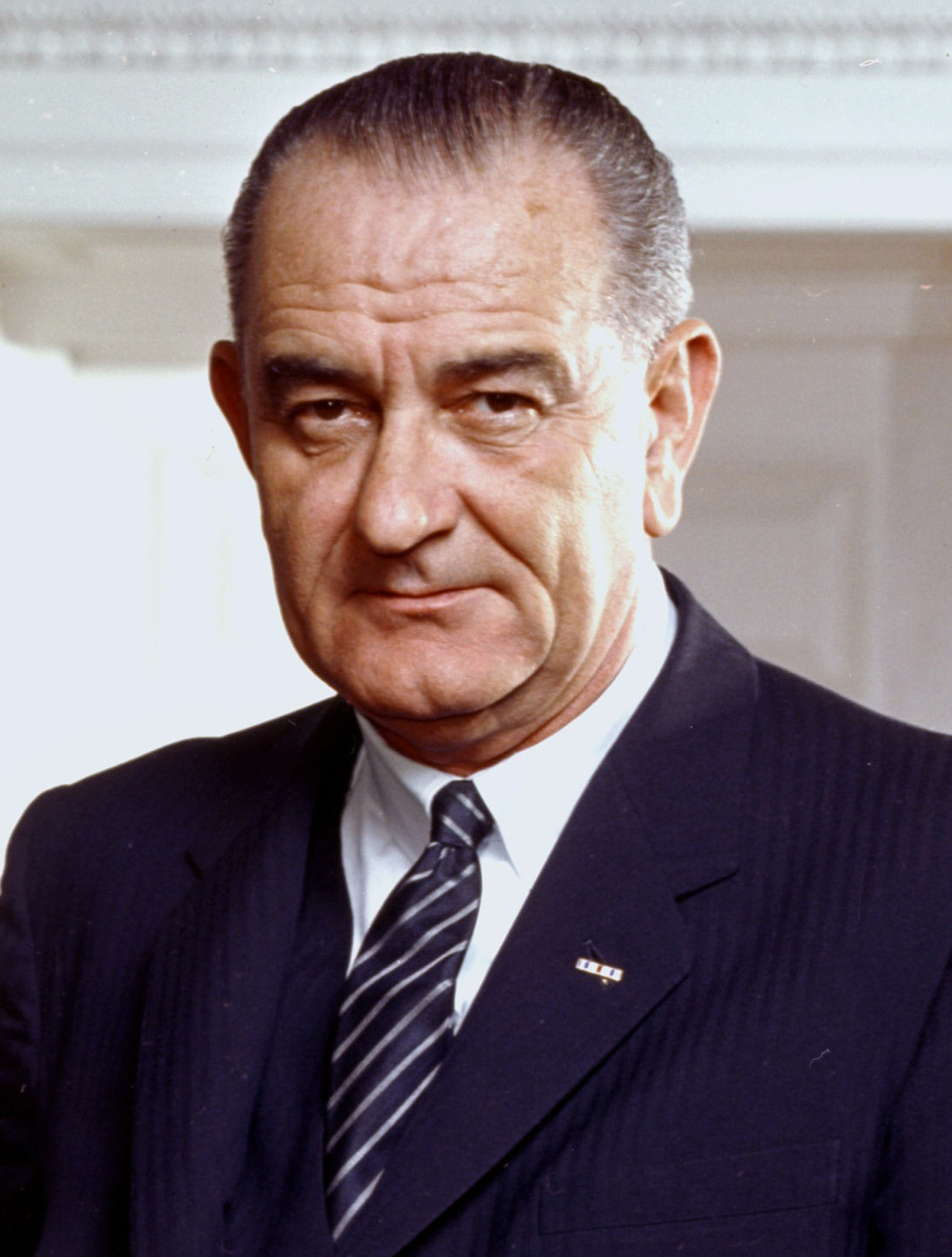
Theodore Roosevelt, Calvin Coolidge, Harry S. Truman, and Lyndon B. Johnson all were first elected as vice presidents, then elected to a full term as presidents.

The president of the United States is the head of state and head of government of the United States, indirectly elected to a four-year term via the Electoral College. The president is eligible for re-election, but since 1951 under the 22nd Amendment to the Constitution of the United States cannot be re-elected twice (no person may serve more than two full terms as president or one term if they have served over two years of a partial term).

== List ==
Term in office	President	Election	Challengers	Notes
1789–1797	George Washington	1792	–	Washington ran unopposed.
1801–1809	Thomas Jefferson	1804	Charles Cotesworth Pinckney	Jefferson ran with a different running mate for his reelection.
1809–1817	James Madison	1812	DeWitt Clinton	Madison ran with a different running mate due to his incumbent vice president dying in office.
1817–1825	James Monroe	1820	–	Like Washington, Monroe ran unopposed.
1829–1837	Andrew Jackson	1832	Henry Clay, John Floyd and William Wirt	The first reelection race with more than two candidates receiving electoral votes.
1861–1865	Abraham Lincoln	1864	George B. McClellan	These elections were held during the American Civil War.
1869–1877	Ulysses S. Grant	1872	Horace Greeley	Greeley was the only candidate running, however, after the popular vote was counted but before the Electoral College cast its votes, he died. As a result, electors previously committed to Greeley voted for four candidates for president (Thomas A. Hendricks, Benjamin Gratz Brown, Charles J. Jenkins and David Davis). To date, this is the only instance in U.S. history in which a major presidential candidate who won electoral votes died during the election process.
1885–1889 / 1893–1897	Grover Cleveland	1892	Benjamin Harrison, James B. Weaver	Cleveland lost his reelection campaign in 1888 to Harrison, then ran again in 1892 to win a nonconsecutive reelection against Harrison.
1897–1901	William McKinley	1900	William Jennings Bryan	Bryan also ran for the presidency in 1896.
1901–1909	Theodore Roosevelt	1904	Alton B. Parker	Roosevelt was first elected as vice president, then became president when McKinley died, and later elected to a full term as president.
1913–1921	Woodrow Wilson	1916	Charles Evans Hughes	
1923–1929	Calvin Coolidge	1924	John W. Davis, Robert M. La Follette	Coolidge was first elected as vice president, then became president when Warren G. Harding died, and later elected to a full term as president.
1933–1945	Franklin D. Roosevelt	1936	Alf Landon	
1933–1945	Franklin D. Roosevelt	1940	Wendell Willkie	
1933–1945	Franklin D. Roosevelt	1944	Thomas E. Dewey	
1945–1953	Harry S. Truman	1948	Thomas E. Dewey, Strom Thurmond	Truman was first elected as vice president, then became president when Roosevelt died, and later elected to a full term as president.
1953–1961	Dwight D. Eisenhower	1956	Adlai Stevenson II	Stevenson also ran for the presidency in 1952.
1963–1969	Lyndon B. Johnson	1964	Barry Goldwater	Johnson was first elected as vice president, then became president when John F. Kennedy died, and later elected to a full term as president.
1969–1974	Richard Nixon	1972	George McGovern	
1981–1989	Ronald Reagan	1984	Walter Mondale	Mondale served as vice president under Jimmy Carter, whom Reagan defeated in 1980.
1993–2001	Bill Clinton	1996	Bob Dole, Ross Perrot	Perot did not win any electoral votes, but gained over 8 million votes in the popular vote.
2001–2009	George W. Bush	2004	John Kerry	
2009–2017	Barack Obama	2012	Mitt Romney	
2017–2021 / 2025–	Donald Trump	2024	Kamala Harris	Trump lost his reelection campaign in 2020 to Joe Biden, then ran again in 2024 to win a nonconsecutive reelection against Biden's vice president.
