= 1804 United States presidential election in Rhode Island =

- November 21, 1804
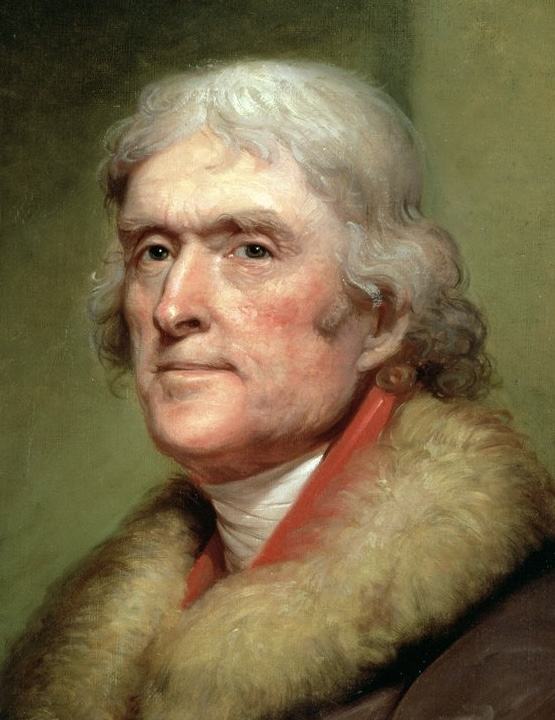
Nominee	Thomas Jefferson
Party	Democratic-Republican
Home state	Virginia
Running mate	George Clinton
Electoral vote	4
Popular vote	1,312
Percentage	100.0%

Jefferson
100%
No data
President before election
Thomas Jefferson
Democratic-Republican
Elected President
Thomas Jefferson
Democratic-Republican

A presidential election was held in Rhode Island on November 21, 1804, as part of the 1804 United States presidential election. The Democratic-Republican Party's ticket of incumbent president Thomas Jefferson and former New York governor George Clinton was elected unanimously. The Federalist Party did not nominate electors. Jefferson won the national election in a landslide over the de facto Federalist candidate, Charles Cotesworth Pinckney.

== General election ==
=== Summary ===
Rhode Island chose four electors on a statewide general ticket. Nineteenth-century election laws required voters to elect the members of the Electoral College individually, rather than as a block. This sometimes resulted in small differences in the number of votes cast for electors pledged to the same presidential nominee, if some voters did not vote for all the electors nominated by a party. The following table shows the result for the leading Democratic-Republican elector to give an approximate sense of the statewide popular vote.

1804 United States presidential election in Rhode Island
Party	Candidate	Votes	%
Democratic-Republican	Thomas Jefferson George Clinton	1,312	100.00
Total votes		1,312	100.00

=== Results ===
1804 United States presidential election in Rhode Island
Party	Candidate	Votes
Democratic-Republican	James Aldrich	1,312
Democratic-Republican	James Helme	1,311
Democratic-Republican	Benjamin Remington	1,309
Democratic-Republican	Constant Taber	1,308
Total votes		≈1,312

=== Results by county ===
1804 United States presidential election in Rhode Island by county
County	Thomas Jefferson Democratic-Republican		Total
County	Votes	%	Total
Bristol	38	100.00	38
Kent	138	100.00	138
Newport	345	100.00	345
Providence	575	100.00	575
Washington	216	100.00	216
TOTAL	1,312	100.00	1,312

== See also ==
- United States presidential elections in Rhode Island

== Bibliography ==
- Dauer, Manning Julian (2002). "Election of 1804". In Schlesinger, Arthur M. Jr.; Israel, Fred L. (eds.). History of American Presidential Elections, 1789–2001. Vol. 1. Philadelphia: Chelsea House Publishers. pp. 159–82.
- Lampi, Philip J. (n.d.). "Electoral College". A New Nation Votes. American Antiquarian Society.
- Lampi, Philip J. (2012). "Rhode Island 1804 Electoral College". A New Nation Votes. American Antiquarian Society.
