= 1804 United States presidential election in Kentucky =

- November 2, 1804
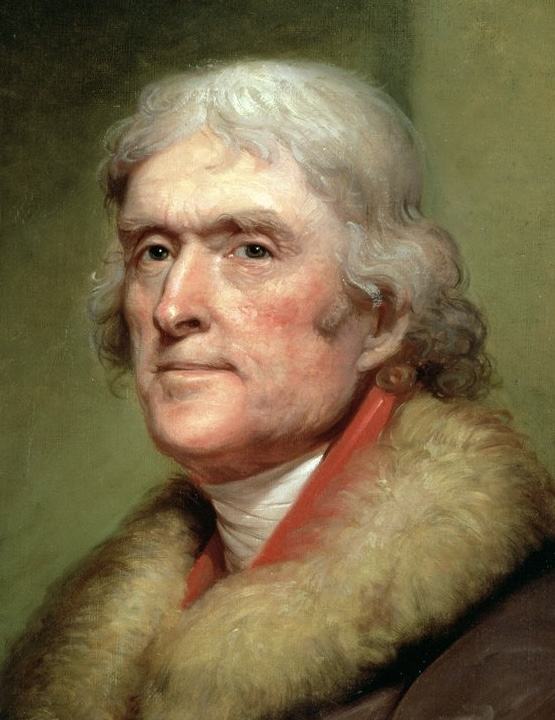
Nominee	Thomas Jefferson
Party	Democratic-Republican
Home state	Virginia
Running mate	George Clinton
Electoral vote	8
Popular vote	5,080
Percentage	100.0%
County results
Jefferson
90–100%
No data
President before election
Thomas Jefferson
Democratic-Republican
Elected President
Thomas Jefferson
Democratic-Republican

A presidential election was held in Kentucky between November 2, 1804, as part of the 1804 United States presidential election. The Democratic-Republican Party's ticket of incumbent president Thomas Jefferson and former New York governor George Clinton was elected unanimously. Jefferson won the national election in a landslide over the Federalist former U.S. minister to France, Charles Cotesworth Pinckney.

== General election ==
=== Summary ===
Kentucky voters chose eight electors from a field of 31 candidates, all Democratic-Republicans, who ran in the state's two multi-member districts. Nineteenth-century election laws required voters to elect the members of the Electoral College individually, rather than as a block. This sometimes resulted in small differences in the number of votes cast for electors pledged to the same presidential nominee, if some voters did not vote for all the electors nominated by a party. The following table calculates the sum of the votes for the leading Democratic-Republican candidate in each district to give an approximate sense of the statewide popular vote.

1804 United States presidential election in Kentucky
Party	Candidate	Votes	%
Democratic-Republican	Thomas Jefferson George Clinton	5,080	100.00
Total votes		5,080	100.00

=== Results by district ===
District	E.V.	Thomas Jefferson Democratic-Republican			Total
District	E.V.	Votes	%	E.V.	Total
Kentucky–Northern	4	2,827	100.00	4	2,827
Kentucky–Southern	4	2,253	100.00	4	2,253
TOTAL	8	5,080	100.00	8	5,080

==== Northern District ====
1804 United States presidential election in Kentucky's Northern District
Party	Candidate	Votes
Democratic-Republican	Charles Scott	2,827
Democratic-Republican	John Coburn	1,806
Democratic-Republican	Hubbard Taylor	1,592
Democratic-Republican	William Irvine	1,267
Democratic-Republican	Thomas Bodley	1,185
Democratic-Republican	James Garrard	777
Democratic-Republican	Robert Sanders	695
Democratic-Republican	Duval Payne	386
Democratic-Republican	Robert Todd	385
Democratic-Republican	John Hall	317
Democratic-Republican	George S. Smith	263
Democratic-Republican	John Price	226
Democratic-Republican	Thomas Irwin	52
Total votes		≈2,827

==== Southern District ====
1804 United States presidential election in Kentucky's Southern District
Party	Candidate	Votes
Democratic-Republican	Isaac Shelby	2,253
Democratic-Republican	Ninian Edwards	1,585
Democratic-Republican	Joseph Lewis	1,310
Democratic-Republican	William Roberts	1,207
Total votes		≈2,253

=== Results by county ===
This table shows the highest vote for a Democratic-Republican elector in each county. Returns are missing from all but a few counties; the totals presented here therefore differ significantly from the statewide summary based on the district returns.

County	Thomas Jefferson Democratic-Republican		Total
County	Votes	%	Total
Adair	**		**
Barren	**		**
Boone	**		**
Bourbon	**		**
Bracken	**		**
Breckinridge	**		**
Bullitt	**		**
Campbell	**		**
Christian	**		**
Clarke	**		**
Cumberland	**		**
Fayette	**		**
Fleming	**		**
Floyd	**		**
Franklin	442	100.00	442
Gallatin	**		**
Garrard	**		**
Green	**		**
Greenup	**		**
Hardin	104	100.00	104
Harrison	**		**
Henderson	**		**
Henry	**		**
Jefferson	**		**
Jessamine	**		**
Knox	**		**
Lincoln	**		**
Livingston	**		**
Logan	**		**
Madison	**		**
Mason	**		**
Mercer	**		**
Montgomery	**		**
Muhlenberg	**		**
Nelson	277	100.00	277
Nicholas	**		**
Ohio	**		**
Pendleton	**		**
Pulaski	**		**
Scott	**		**
Shelby	403	100.00	403
Warren	**		**
Washington	175	100.00	175
Wayne	**		**
Woodford	**		**
TOTAL	1,401	100.00	1,401

== See also ==
- United States presidential elections in Kentucky

== Bibliography ==
- Dauer, Manning Julian (2002). "Election of 1804". In Schlesinger, Arthur M. Jr.; Israel, Fred L. (eds.). History of American Presidential Elections, 1789–2001. Vol. 1. Philadelphia: Chelsea House Publishers. pp. 159–82.
- Lampi, Philip J. (n.d.). "Electoral College". A New Nation Votes. American Antiquarian Society.
- Lampi, Philip J. (2012a). "Kentucky 1804 Electoral College, Northern District". A New Nation Votes. American Antiquarian Society.
- Lampi, Philip J. (2012b). "Kentucky 1804 Electoral College, Southern District". A New Nation Votes. American Antiquarian Society.
