= 1804 United States presidential election in New York =

- November 9, 1804
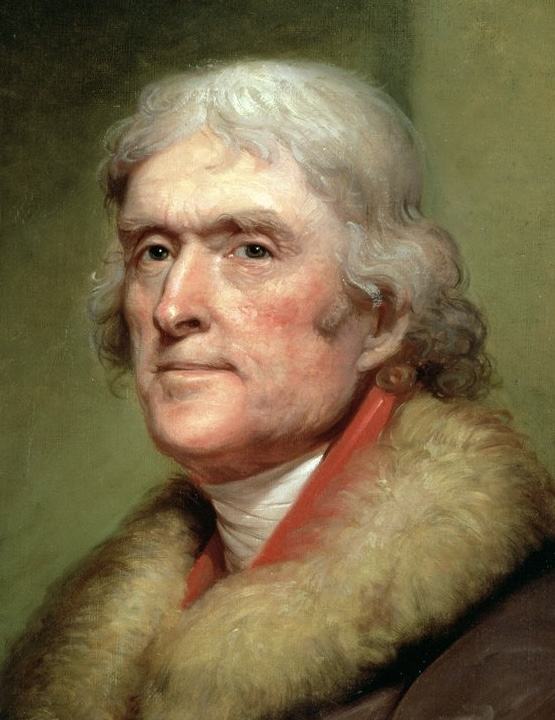

Nominee	Thomas Jefferson	Unpledged electors
Party	Democratic-Republican	Federalist
Home state	Virginia	N/A
Running mate	George Clinton	N/A
Electoral vote	19	0
Legislative vote	75 A · 25 S	15 A · 3 S
Percentage	83.3% A · 89.3% S	16.7% A · 10.7% S
President before election
Thomas Jefferson
Democratic-Republican
Elected President
Thomas Jefferson
Democratic-Republican

A presidential election was held in New York on November 9, 1804, as part of the 1804 United States presidential election. The Democratic-Republican Party's ticket of incumbent president Thomas Jefferson and former New York governor George Clinton defeated the Federalist Party's ticket in the New York State Legislature.

Jefferson won the national election in a landslide over the de facto Federalist candidate, Charles Cotesworth Pinckney. Although a clandestine gathering of Federalist members of Congress had nominated Pinckney in February, the Federalist electors were formally unpledged. The Federalist press attempted to sow discord in the Democratic-Republican ranks by encouraging the electors to vote for Clinton for president, rather than for Jefferson as pledged, but was not successful in obtaining defections.

== General election ==
1804 United States presidential election in New York
Party	Candidate	Assembly	Senate
Democratic-Republican	Abraham Bancker	75	25
Democratic-Republican	Cornelius Bergen	75	25
Democratic-Republican	Thomas Brooks	75	25
Democratic-Republican	Adam Comstock	75	25
Democratic-Republican	John Cramer	75	25
Democratic-Republican	Sylvester Dering	75	25
Democratic-Republican	Jonas Earl	75	25
Democratic-Republican	Joseph Ellicott	75	25
Democratic-Republican	Conrad I. Elmendorf	75	25
Democratic-Republican	James Fairlie	75	25
Democratic-Republican	William Floyd	75	25
Democratic-Republican	John Herring	75	25
Democratic-Republican	Matthias B. Hildreth	75	25
Democratic-Republican	Stephen Miller	75	25
Democratic-Republican	Albert Pawling	75	25
Democratic-Republican	Henry Quackenboss	75	25
Democratic-Republican	Isaac Sargent	75	25
Democratic-Republican	Ezra Thompson	75	25
Democratic-Republican	John Wood	75	25
Federalist	Egbert Benson	15	3
Federalist	David Brooks	15	3
Federalist	James Gordon	15	3
Federalist	Jonathan Hasbrouck	15	3
Federalist	Zina Hitchcock	15	3
Federalist	Nathaniel W. Howell	15	3
Federalist	John Jay	15	3
Federalist	James Kent	15	3
Federalist	Dereck Lane	15	3
Federalist	John Livingston	15	3
Federalist	Vincent Matthews	15	3
Federalist	Gouverneur Morris	15	3
Federalist	Jacob Morris	15	3
Federalist	Charles Newkerk	15	3
Federalist	Jacob Radcliff	15	3
Federalist	Philip Schuyler	15	3
Federalist	Richard Thorn	15	3
Federalist	Stephen Van Rensselaer	15	3
Total votes		90	28

== See also ==
- United States presidential elections in New York

== Bibliography ==
- Dauer, Manning Julian (2002). "Election of 1804". In Schlesinger, Arthur M. Jr.; Israel, Fred L. (eds.). History of American Presidential Elections, 1789–2001. Vol. 1. Philadelphia: Chelsea House Publishers. pp. 159–82.
- Lampi, Philip J. (2012). "New York 1804 Electoral College". A New Nation Votes. American Antiquarian Society.
- New York (n.d.). Journal of the Assembly of the State of New York. Albany.
