= 1804 United States presidential election in Tennessee =

- November 1–2, 1804
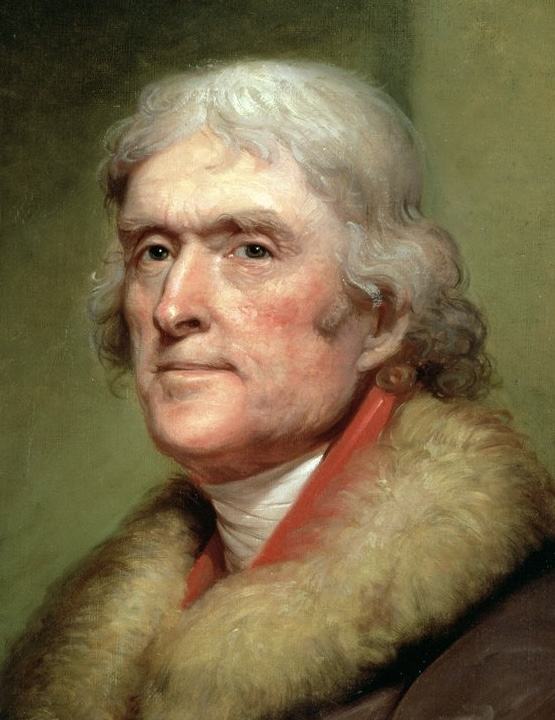
Nominee	Thomas Jefferson
Party	Democratic-Republican
Home state	Virginia
Running mate	George Clinton
Electoral vote	5
Popular vote	943
Percentage	100.0%
President before election
Thomas Jefferson
Democratic-Republican
Elected President
Thomas Jefferson
Democratic-Republican

A presidential election was held in Tennessee on November 1 and 2, 1804, as part of the 1804 United States presidential election. The Democratic-Republican Party's ticket of incumbent president Thomas Jefferson and former New York governor George Clinton was elected unanimously in each of the state's five electoral districts. Jefferson won the national election in a landslide over the de facto Federalist candidate, Charles Cotesworth Pinckney.

== General election ==
=== Summary ===
Tennessee chose five electors from single-member districts. Returns from four of the districts have been lost. Two electors pledged to Jefferson ran in the fifth district. Nineteenth-century election laws required voters to elect the members of the Electoral College individually, rather than as a block. The following table calculates the sum of all votes for electors pledged to Jefferson to give an approximate sense of the statewide popular vote.

1804 United States presidential election in Tennessee
Party	Candidate	Votes	%
Democratic-Republican	Thomas Jefferson George Clinton	943	100.00
Total votes		943	100.00

=== Results by district ===
1804 United States presidential election in Tennessee by district
District	E.V.	Thomas Jefferson Democratic-Republican			Total
District	E.V.	Votes	%	E.V.	Total
Tennessee–1	1	**		1	**
Tennessee–2	1	**		1	**
Tennessee–3	1	**		1	**
Tennessee–4	1	**		1	**
Tennessee–5	1	943	100.00	1	943
TOTAL	5	943	100.00	5	943

==== District 1 ====
Returns from this district appear to be lost. David Deaderick, a Democratic-Republican, was elected.

==== District 2 ====
Returns from this district appear to be lost. Richard Mitchell, a Democratic-Republican, was elected.

==== District 3 ====
Returns from this district appear to be lost. Robert Houston, a Democratic-Republican, was elected.

==== District 4 ====
Returns from this district appear to be lost. William Martin, a Democratic-Republican, was elected.

==== District 5 ====
1804 United States presidential election in Tennessee
Party	Candidate	Votes	%
Democratic-Republican	George Ridley	778	82.50
Democratic-Republican	Henry Small	165	17.50
Total votes		943	100.00

== See also ==
- United States presidential elections in Tennessee

== Bibliography ==
- Dauer, Manning Julian (2002). "Election of 1804". In Schlesinger, Arthur M. Jr.; Israel, Fred L. (eds.). History of American Presidential Elections, 1789–2001. Vol. 1. Philadelphia: Chelsea House Publishers. pp. 159–82.
- Lampi, Philip J. (n.d.). "Electoral College". A New Nation Votes. American Antiquarian Society.
- Lampi, Philip J. (2012a). "Tennessee 1804 Electoral College, District 1". A New Nation Votes. American Antiquarian Society.
- Lampi, Philip J. (2012b). "Tennessee 1804 Electoral College, District 2". A New Nation Votes. American Antiquarian Society.
- Lampi, Philip J. (2012c). "Tennessee 1804 Electoral College, District 3". A New Nation Votes. American Antiquarian Society.
- Lampi, Philip J. (2012d). "Tennessee 1804 Electoral College, District 4". A New Nation Votes. American Antiquarian Society.
- Lampi, Philip J. (2012e). "Tennessee 1804 Electoral College, District 5". A New Nation Votes. American Antiquarian Society.
- Speer, Ed (Summer 2001). "Tennessee's Presidential Electors, 1796-1836". Tennessee Historical Quarterly. 60 (2): 120–26.
