= Henry D. Irwin =

Henry D. Irwin (October 22, 1917 – September 3, 1988) was a Republican presidential elector (from Oklahoma) for the 1960 U.S. presidential election who became a "faithless elector" when he declined to vote as pledged.

== Early life ==
Irwin was born on October 22, 1917, in Oklahoma, was a 1941 West Point graduate, a graduate student at the University of Tulsa, and an engineer for the Phillips Petroleum Company. While at the University of Tulsa, he advocated for the creation of a Constitution Party.

He was married to Elizabeth J. Phillips, granddaughter of Frank Phillips, the founder of the Phillips Petroleum Company. They owned houses in Bartlesville, Oklahoma, New York City, and Connecticut but also bought a run down castle in Ireland and refurbished it "Castlefergus" Ballyhannon, Quin in County Clare. Later in life, he attempted to promote his plans for nuclear-powered aircraft to the U.S. Senate. After divorcing Phillips in 1979, Irwin received alimony, the first man to be awarded it in New York State following the 1979 Orr v. Orr decision. Irwin died on September 3, 1988, in Southbury, Connecticut.

== 1960 presidential election ==
In the 1960 presidential election, Irwin, who had been pledged to vote for then-Vice President Richard Nixon (of California) and Senator Henry Cabot Lodge Jr. (of Massachusetts), instead cast his presidential electoral ballot for Harry F. Byrd who was a conservative Democratic Senator from Virginia. Unlike other electors who voted for Byrd for president, Irwin cast his vice presidential electoral vote for Arizona Republican Senator Barry Goldwater. Irwin later admitted in an interview with CBS that he "could not stomach" Nixon.

Irwin made a public effort to attempt to convince his fellow Republican presidential electors to also change their votes. After the November 1960 presidential election, Irwin sent out the following telegram addressed to the other 219 Republican electors:

I am Oklahoma Republican elector. The Republican electors cannot deny the election to Kennedy. Sufficient conservative Democratic electors available to deny labor Socialist [sic] nominee. Would you consider Byrd President, Goldwater Vice President, or wire any acceptable substitute. All replies strict confidence.

Irwin received about 40 replies from other electors but all of the other pledged electors voted as pledged. He claimed that national and state party officials knew of his plan though then-Oklahoma Republican chair Henry Bellmon stated that Irwin acted completely on his own. Irwin would be subpoenaed by a Senate committee to testify about his electoral vote after refusing an initial invitation.

Also in the 1960 presidential election, 14 unpledged electors (eight from Mississippi and six from Alabama) cast their presidential votes for Byrd. However, none of them voted for Goldwater as vice president, instead giving their second vote to Senator Strom Thurmond of South Carolina. However they are not faithless electors but rather unpledged electors

Oklahoma voters had passed an amendment to the Oklahoma Constitution in the summer of 1960 to allow the state parties to choose their own electors in presidential elections rather than allowing individuals to run in primary elections for presidential electors (Irwin was unopposed in his 1960 primary). The state later passed a law that would fine electors if they did not vote for their party's nominee in the election.
