= Manning J. Dauer =

Dr. Manning Dauer
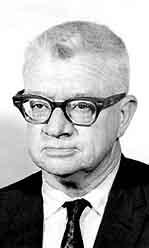
- Born: August 12, 1909; North Carolina
- Died: January 11, 1987 (aged 77)
- Education: University of Illinois; University of Florida
- Awards: Was responsible for the reapportionment of the state of Florida
- Scientific career
- Fields: Political science
- Workplaces: University of Florida

Manning Julian Dauer was an American political scientist.

== Early life ==
Dauer was born in 1909 in North Carolina. He received his bachelor's degree (1930) and master's degree (1931) from the University of Florida and his Ph.D. from the University of Illinois (1933).

== Career ==
During 50 years of teaching political science, Manning Dauer influenced more than 15,000 students, including U.S. Sen. Bob Graham. Dauer was a student at UF, earning his bachelor's degree in 1930 and his master's degree in 1931. After receiving his doctoral degree from the University of Illinois in 1933, he returned to UF in 1933 as an instructor. He remained at UF until his retirement in 1980 except for a period of service in the U.S. Army Air Force during World War II. Dauer established UF's political science department in 1950. He was named a distinguished service professor at UF in 1972 and was awarded an honorary doctor of law degree in 1983.

Dauer devoted his life to UF and to the state of Florida, and was one of the foremost scholars of Florida politics.

Dauer taught at both the University of Florida's Department of History and Political Science and then at the Department of Political Science when it became a separate department in 1950. He was the first chair of the Department of Political Science, and served in this position for 25 years. His primary research interests was in political theory and American politics, and he was the author of numerous articles, chapters, and books. He wrote The Adams Federalists, considered the definitive study of Federalist Party during the administration of John Adams.

Dauer is best known as the principal articulate of the 1967 reapportionment plan for Florida, which was mandated by a federal district court (see Swann v. Adams). He also was a key consultant to the Florida Constitutional Revision Commission and helped formulate the most recent Florida Constitution, adopted in 1968. Dauer served in leadership positions with the American Political Science Association, Southern Political Science Association, and the Florida Political Science Association.

== Death and legacy ==
Dauer died in 1987. Dauer Hall at UF is named after him.

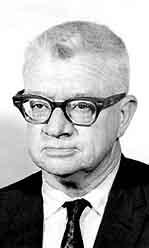
Manning J. Dauer
