= Unpledged elector =

Type of person in United States presidential elections

In United States presidential elections, an unpledged elector is a person nominated to stand as an elector but who has not pledged to support any particular presidential or vice presidential candidate, and is free to vote for any candidate when elected a member of the Electoral College. Presidential elections are indirect, with voters in each state choosing electors on Election Day in November, and these electors choosing the president and vice president of the United States in December. Electors in practice have since the 19th century almost always agreed in advance to vote for a particular candidate – that is, they are said to have been pledged to that candidate. In several elections in the 20th century, however, competitive campaigns were mounted by candidates who made no pledge to any presidential nominee before the election. These anomalies largely arose from fissures within the Democratic Party over the issues of civil rights and segregation. No serious general election campaign has been mounted to elect unpledged electors in any state since 1964.

An unpledged elector is distinct from a faithless elector who pledges their vote for a particular candidate before the election but ultimately votes for someone else or fails to vote at all.

== Constitutional background ==
When the United States Constitution was written, the Founding Fathers intended the Electoral College to be a truly deliberative body whose members would choose a president (and vice president, after 1800) based on their own preferences. They also left the method for selecting the electors for each state to the discretion of that state's legislature. Other than the implied expectation that the electors vote for candidates who are constitutionally qualified to serve as president and vice president, the Constitution otherwise places no restriction on the behavior of the electors, and assumes that each is an independent agent.

The system worked without much controversy for the first two presidential elections in which George Washington was the unanimous choice for president and electors' opinions diverged only on the choice for vice president, which was widely seen to be an unimportant post. Washington was not a member of any political party, and had hoped they would not form. Nevertheless, "Federalist" and "Anti-Federalist" factions quickly coalesced in the United States Congress.

Once Washington announced his intention to retire after his second presidential term, U.S. politics very quickly became dominated by strong political party organizations. Even without this particular development, the reality was that electors had only one constitutional duty – electing the president and vice president, while at the same time seeking no other federal office since federal officials are constitutionally barred from serving as electors. In several states, legislatures chose electors. Among the states that selected electors by popular vote, different electoral systems were in place. Some effectively held a statewide vote for all electors – essentially the system most similar to that used in 48 of 50 states today although at this time an electoral mechanism that could effectively compel voters to vote for any particular "slate" of presidential electors had not yet been contemplated. Some states elected two electors in a statewide vote and one in each congressional district (essentially, the system used today in Maine and Nebraska) and a few states experimented with selecting presidential electors in special districts distinct from its congressional districts. More broadly, the franchise (that is, the qualifications that determined who among the adult male population was allowed to vote for state and federal legislators and, where applicable, for presidential electors) varied widely from state to state. However, no matter who was allowed to vote for electors and no matter how they were selected, the only meaningful question any prospective elector had to answer was for whom they would vote for president (and, from 1804 onward, for vice president) and the only real issues of importance to those selecting electors, beyond deciding who they wanted to become president and vice president, was perhaps whether the person or people they selected to represent them in the Electoral College could be trusted to keep their word. Thus, it rapidly became increasingly unrealistic for anyone to be elected to the Electoral College without making a trustworthy "pledge" to vote for particular candidates on behalf of those electing them.

By the 1830s, most states chose their electors by popular vote. While voting for individual electors was still the norm at this point, by this time the electors who appeared on ballots were nominated by the state chapters of national parties with the understanding that they would cast their votes for their party's candidate if elected. Also by this time, political parties had successfully lobbied most states to allow voters to cast one vote for every elector that state had apportioned to it. The main rationale of this system was to greatly simplify the distribution of presidential ballots. Prior to the introduction of the secret ballot, political parties were responsible for printing and distributing their own ballots, thus, allowing voters to cast as many votes as the state had electors meant a party could print a standardized ballot containing the same slate of the party's presidential electors for each state. Also, whether an intended consequence or not, this system resulted in most states having a de facto (but not de jure) winner-take-all method of allocating presidential electors.

Eventually, this arrangement became such a given in presidential elections that when the time came for the states to take over the printing and distribution of ballots (a development necessitated by the introduction of the secret ballot in the 1880s) most states did not bother to list the names of the electors on ballots, instead listing the candidates to whom those electors were pledged. In doing so, they also ensured that the winner-take-all method of selecting presidential electors that had become so firmly entrenched in the U.S. presidential electoral system by that point would become established by law in most states. There were some exceptions, however, such as Alabama, described below.

== Unpledged electors in the 20th century ==
=== Background ===
After the American Civil War and Reconstruction, the Democratic Party gained an almost unbreakable dominance in the Southern United States, and the Republicans, associated with Abraham Lincoln and the Union cause, were correspondingly unelectable there. The nationwide Democratic party became increasingly liberal in the early 20th century, a shift that accelerated with the election of Franklin D. Roosevelt. By contrast, the leaders of the Democratic Party in the South, although somewhat supportive of certain parts of the New Deal and other liberal Democratic economic policies, were in many other aspects conservative. In particular, they were vehemently protective of segregation and strongly opposed to civil rights for African Americans.

In several mid-20th-century elections, unpledged Democratic electors appeared on the ballots in several Southern states; in some cases they ran in opposition to electors pledged to the nationwide Democratic candidate, and in others they were the only Democratic electors that appeared on the ballot. The goal was to have electors who could act as kingmakers in a close election, extracting concessions that would favor conservative Southern Democrats in exchange for their votes.

=== Election ===
==== 1944 ====
The first modern slates of unpledged electors were fielded in the 1944 election as a protest against certain aspects of President Franklin D. Roosevelt’s New Deal and support for desegregation.

In Texas, a splinter group of Democrats known as the Texas Regulars fielded a slate of electors not pledged to any candidate; similar slates were on the ballot in South Carolina and Mississippi. While they won or placed second in several counties, none of the groups met much success.

==== 1956 ====
In 1956, unpledged slates were on the ballot in Alabama (20,150 votes, 4.1% of the vote), Louisiana (44,520 votes, 7.2% of the vote and they won four parishes), Mississippi (42,266 votes, 17.3% of the vote and they won seven counties) and South Carolina (88,509 votes, 29.5% of the vote and 21 counties).

==== 1960 ====
The 1960 election was the only election that saw unpledged electors actually elected to the electoral college.

In that year, a slate of eight unpledged electors in Mississippi won a plurality of the vote there (116,248 votes, or 39% of the total).

Louisiana's popular vote went to a slate of electors pledged to Kennedy and Johnson, but a slate of unpledged electors on the ballot there won 169,572 votes (21% of the vote).

In Georgia, the state legislature, although allowing for a separate group of unpledged electors according to state law, requested the people give a non-binding straw vote to determine whether Kennedy should have pledged electors on the ballot or whether his electors should be free to choose to act as unpledged electors. The voters overwhelmingly supported the "Pledge Free" Electors, but after it was clear they ultimately would not affect the Electoral College's decision all Georgia electors voted for Kennedy, despite concerns they would abandon their pledges and become faithless electors.

In Alabama, the vote was not for the presidential candidates but for individual electors, with each of the 11 electors having their own separate elections. As a result of Alabama's Democratic primaries, five of the eleven nominated Democratic electors were pledged to Democratic nominees John F. Kennedy and Lyndon B. Johnson and six were unpledged. Although all eleven Democratic electors were elected, the unusual situation has led to ambiguity about the correct method to calculate popular votes for Kennedy and the unpledged electors. The common practice is to give Kennedy the votes for his most-voted pledged elector and to give unpledged electors their popular votes by subtracting the votes for the most-voted unpledged elector by the votes for the most-voted Kennedy-pledged elector; the unusual calculation for the unpledged electors is done so that the total votes align with the estimated total number of people who voted in Alabama's presidential contest (although the exact number is uncertain because voters are allowed to abstain from voting for all 11 electors' elections). However, the electoral split between Kennedy and the unpledged electors has been used to argue for a lesser-used method of splitting the vote of the highest-voted Democratic elector proportionally between Kennedy and the unpledged electors; some have used said vote split to argue that Kennedy had lost the popular vote to Nixon, both in the Alabama popular vote and resultantly the national popular vote. Even disregarding proportionally splitting the vote of the highest-voted Democratic elector, simply summing Kennedy and Nixon's total votes from their multiple electors and evenly splitting them among the 11 electors' races would give Nixon a national popular vote victory of 34,108,157 to 34,076,629. Such calculation would temporarily be used in the Congressional Quarterly before the change to the current vote-counting method.

When the electoral college cast its vote, all fourteen unpledged electors cast their votes for conservative Democrat Harry F. Byrd for president and Strom Thurmond for vice president after trying to influence other Southern states into unpledging their electors to join them. They were joined by Henry D. Irwin from Oklahoma, a faithless Republican elector who objected to Republican nominee Richard M. Nixon. Irwin cast his vice presidential vote for Barry Goldwater. Irwin had attempted to broker a coalition between the unpledged electors and other Republican electors, but to no avail: Kennedy and Johnson won a clear majority of the electoral vote.

==== 1964 ====
The last slate of unpledged electors to date was filed in Alabama in the 1964 election. The slate was supported by Democratic Alabama Governor George C. Wallace while the national Democratic nominees, Lyndon B. Johnson and Hubert H. Humphrey, did not appear on Alabama ballots. The electors won 30.6 percent of the vote, but the state was ultimately won by Republican nominees Barry Goldwater and William E. Miller.

=== Aftermath ===
The Republican ticket's victory in Alabama and four other Southern states (the only states Goldwater carried besides his home state of Arizona) heralded a trend that would put an end to the practice of nominating unpledged electors.

As a strategy, it had been largely ineffective, and southern conservatives, many of whom were still reluctant to vote Republican, began urging Governor Wallace to run for the White House in 1968 under the auspices of a traditional third-party presidential campaign. Once Wallace announced his intention to run for president, the rationale for running slates of formally unpledged electors disappeared. Nevertheless, Wallace sought commitments from his "pledged" electors in the states he was most likely to win that they would not necessarily vote for him but rather as he directed, thus allowing the Alabama Governor to act as a power broker in case of an election with no clear winner in the weeks between the general election and the Electoral College vote. Wallace ultimately carried four Southern states under the American Independent Party banner, in addition to his home state of Alabama in which he ran as the official nominee of the state's Democratic Party. While a shift of a few thousand votes in a handful of key states would have resulted in no candidate winning a clear majority of the electoral vote, Republican Richard Nixon ultimately won a clear majority of the electoral vote. Unable to influence the result, Wallace's 45 electors voted as pledged; he ultimately finished with 46 electoral votes due to the support of a North Carolinian faithless elector.

Following Nixon's triumph in 1968, former Southern Democratic supporters began voting Republican in large numbers. By 1972, Wallace was seeking the national Democratic nomination on a more moderate platform in a presidential campaign that was ultimately cut short after he was seriously wounded by a would-be assassin. Nixon would sweep the South in his landslide victory that year. By the time the Democrats regained the White House following the 1976 election, it was under the candidacy of Jimmy Carter, a Southerner who in contrast to most of his predecessors was firmly opposed to segregation. Carter nevertheless managed to almost sweep the South, with Virginia being the only former Confederate state to not vote for him. Many other Southern Democrats, including Wallace himself, would soon follow Carter's lead.

The 1976 presidential was the last such contest in which the Democratic nominee carried a majority of Southern states. Today, the practice of nominating unpledged electors combined with Wallace's third-party presidential campaign can be seen as a transitional phase between the Democrats' traditional hold on the South and the modern political environment where the region is a Republican stronghold and where state Democratic parties, while still more conservative in some respects compared to other regions, tend to be to the left of the Republicans as in the rest of the country and tend to be more supported in predominantly African-American locales.
