= Block voting =

Type of multi-winner plurality/majority electoral system

Block or bloc voting refers to a class of electoral systems where multiple candidates are elected simultaneously. They do not guarantee minority representation and allow a group of voters (a voting bloc) to ensure that only their preferred candidates are elected. In these systems, a voter can select as many candidates as there are open seats. That is, the voter has as many votes to cast as the number of seats to fill. The block voting systems are among various election systems available for use in multi-member districts where the voting system allows for the selection of multiple winners at once.

Block voting falls under the multiple non-transferable vote category, a term often used interchangeably with this term. Block voting may be also associated with the concept of winner-take-all representation in multi-winner electoral systems or the plurality election method.

Other variations of block voting include block approval voting, and party block voting (sometimes called a general ticket). Block voting is often contrasted with proportional representation, where the aim is to ensure that each voter's vote carries equal weight. In contrast, block voting tends to favor the most popular party, resulting in a landslide victory.

== Terminology ==
The term "plurality at-large" is common in representative elections where members represent an entire body (such as a city, state, province, or nation). In multi-member electoral districts, the system is often referred to as "block voting" or the "bloc vote." This article's description of block voting specifically pertains to "unlimited voting," unlike "limited voting," where voters have fewer votes than the available seats. The term "block voting" may also refer to a simple plurality election of slates (electoral lists) in multi-member districts.

== Types of block voting ==
Multiple winners are typically elected simultaneously in one non-transferable round of voting. In some cases, multiple non-transferable voting (MNTV) appears in a runoff or two-round version, as seen in certain local elections in France, where candidates without an absolute majority are thinned out before a second round.

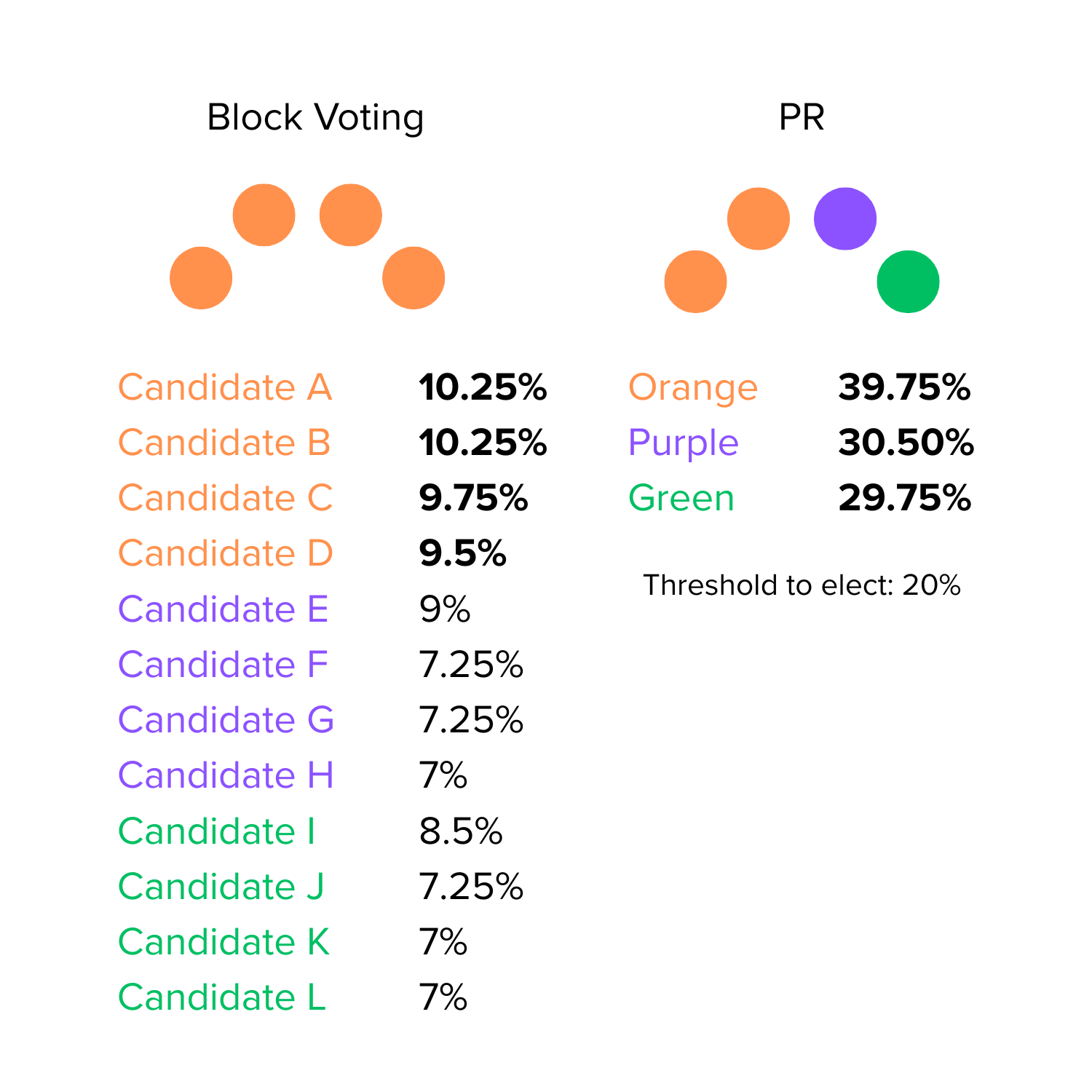
Since block voting is a FPTP election and not proportional (as in party-list on the right), it typically elects a landslide slate of candidates.

=== Plurality block voting ===
In a block voting election, all candidates compete for m positions, often referred to as the district magnitude. Each voter selects up to m candidates on the ballot. The m candidates with the most votes, but not necessarily a majority, are elected and fill the positions.

=== Two-round block voting ===
Two-round block voting is a variation of plurality-at-large where the field of candidates is thinned out before a second round.

=== General ticket / Party block voting ===
Party block voting (PBV) or the general ticket is the party-list version of block voting. In contrast to the classic block vote, where candidates may stand as non-partisan and some minority nominations can theoretically succeed, PBV associates each candidate with a party list voted on by electors, often leading to a landslide outcome. The Parliament of Singapore uses this system for most of its elections.

=== Approval block voting ===
Block approval voting permits every voter to vote for any number of candidates, provided that they do not vote more than once for the same candidate. Block voting, specifically plurality block voting, is compared with preferential block voting as both often produce landslide victories for similar candidates. Instead of checkboxes, preferential block voting utilizes a preferential ballot, making it a multiple transferable vote rather than a multiple non-transferable vote. Under both systems, a slate of the top preferred candidate and their clones typically secures every available seat.

=== Preferential block voting ===
Block voting, or plurality block voting, is often compared with preferential block voting as both systems tend to produce landslide victories for similar candidates. Instead of a series of checkboxes, preferential block voting uses a preferential ballot. A slate of clones of the top preferred candidate will win every seat under both systems, however in preferential block voting this is instead the instant-runoff winner.

== Similar voting systems ==
=== Limited voting (LV) / Partial block voting ===
Partial block voting, also known as limited voting, operates similarly to plurality-at-large voting. However, in partial block voting, each voter casts fewer votes than the number of candidates to be elected. This process enables reasonably sized minorities to achieve some representation, preventing a simple plurality from sweeping every seat. Partial bloc voting is employed in elections to the Gibraltar Parliament, allowing each voter ten votes for seventeen open seats. The typical outcome sees the most popular party winning ten seats and forming the ruling administration. In contrast, the second-most popular party secures seven seats to form the opposition. The Spanish Senate also adopts partial block voting, offering four seats per constituency, with each voter casting three votes. Historically, three- and four-member constituencies in the United Kingdom used partial block voting until the abolition of multimember constituencies.

With fewer votes per voter, the threshold to win decreases under partial block voting, making the results more akin to proportional representation, provided voters and candidates use effective strategies.

== Examples of voting systems ==
=== Plurality block voting and majority block voting ===
Consider a scenario with 12 candidates in a 3-member district among 10,000 voters. Both plurality block voting and majority block voting allow voters to cast three votes (although they need not use all three) but restrict voting to one vote per candidate.

Party A garners roughly 35% support among the electorate, Party B secures around 25%, and the remaining voters mainly support independent candidates but lean toward Party B if compelled to choose between the two parties. Assuming all voters cast their votes sincerely and avoid tactical voting, the following tabulation elucidates the outcomes:

Candidate	Party	Plurality block voting				Majority block voting / 2 round voting							
Candidate	Party	Plurality block voting				1st round				2nd round			
Candidate	Party	Votes	%	Elected?		Votes	%	Elected?		Votes	%	Elected?	
Candidate A1	Party A	3555	36%	3.	Yes	3555	36%	3.		4100	41%	5.	
Candidate A2	Party A	3700	37%	1.	Yes	3700	37%	1.		4200	42%	4.	
Candidate A3	Party A	3600	36%	2.	Yes	3600	36%	2.		3900	39%	7.	
Candidate B1	Party B	2600	26%	4.		2600	26%	4.		5100	51%	1.	Yes
Candidate B2	Party B	2500	25%	5.		2500	25%	5.		4900	49%	2.	Yes
Candidate B3	Party B	2400	24%	6.		2400	24%	6.		4800	48%	3.	Yes
Candidate I1	Independent	2300	23%	8.		2300	23%	8.	eliminated				
Candidate I2	Independent	2395	20%	7.		2395	20%	7.	eliminated				
Candidate I3	Independent	1900	19%	9.		1900	19%	9.	eliminated				
Candidate I4	Independent	1800	15%	10		1800	15%	10	eliminated				
Candidate I5	Independent	650	7%	11.		650	7%	11.	eliminated				
Candidate I6	Independent	600	6%	12.		600	6%	12.	eliminated				
TOTAL votes cast		28000				28000				27000			
TOTAL possible votes		30000				30000				30000			
Voters		10000	100%			10000	100%			10000	100%		

In the second round, voters of independent candidates can vote for candidates of party B. As even fewer voters cast all their 3 votes, even in the second round, some winners do technically win with a majority, but only a plurality in fact (similar to differences between turnout levels in two-round voting).

=== Block voting and approval block voting ===
A 3-member district with 10,000 voters features 12 candidates. Block voting allows each voter to cast only one vote for a single candidate.

- Under unlimited block approval voting, voters can select any number of candidates.
- Under limited block approval voting, voters can cast up to six votes, twice the number of winners.
- Under plurality block voting, voters can cast up to three votes, though it's not mandatory.
- Under limited (block) voting, voters can cast a maximum of two votes.
- Under the single non-transferable vote (which is not block voting), voters can cast only one vote.

Party A has an approximate 35% electorate support, notably due to one well-received candidate. Party B holds around 25% backing, comprising two popular candidates. The remaining voters primarily favor independent candidates, but tend to lean towards Party B if pressed to choose between the two main parties. All voters engage in sincere voting with no tactical influence.

Candidate	Party	Block approval voting				Limited block approval voting				Plurality block voting				Limited (block) voting				Single non-transferable vote			
Candidate	Party	Votes	%	Elected?		Votes	%	Elected?		Votes	%	Elected?		Votes	%	Elected?		Votes	%	Elected?	
Candidate A1	Party A	4200	42%	8.		4000	40%	5.		3555	36%	3.	Yes	1800	18%	4.		800	8%	4.	
Candidate A2	Party A	4500	45%	5.		4100	40%	4.		3700	37%	1.	Yes	3500	35%	1.	Yes	1900	19%	1.	Yes
Candidate A3	Party A	3900	39%	9.		3800	40%	7.		3600	36%	2.	Yes	2000	20%	2.	Yes	700	7%	9.	
Candidate B1	Party B	5200	52%	1.	Yes	4900	49%	1.	Yes	2600	26%	4.		1750	18%	5.		900	9%	3.	Yes
Candidate B2	Party B	5000	50%	2.	Yes	4600	46%	3.	Yes	2500	25%	5.		1950	20%	3.	Yes	1100	11%	2.	Yes
Candidate B3	Party B	4700	47%	4.		4200	42%	2.	Yes	2400	24%	6.		1425	14%	7.		400	4%	12.	
Candidate I1	Independent	4400	44%	6.		3800	38%	7.		2300	23%	8.		1400	14%	8.		800	8%	4.	
Candidate I2	Independent	4900	49%	3.	Yes	4000	40%	5.		2395	20%	7.		1500	15%	6.		800	8%	4.	
Candidate I3	Independent	4400	44%	6.		3700	37%	9.		1900	19%	9.		1300	13%	9.		700	7%	7.	
Candidate I4	Independent	3900	39%	9.		3200	32%	10.		1800	15%	10		1200	12%	10.		700	7%	7.	
Candidate I5	Independent	2600	26%	11.		2000	20%	11.		650	7%	11.		625	6%	11.		600	6%	10.	
Candidate I6	Independent	2300	23%	12.		1700	17%	12.		600	6%	12.		550	6%	12.		500	5%	11.	
TOTAL votes cast		50000				44000				28000				19000				10000			
TOTAL possible votes		120000				60000				30000				20000				10000			
Voters		10000	100%			10000	100%			10000	100%			10000	100%			10000	100%		

- Under the single non-transferable vote, the three most popular candidates based on voters' initial preferences are elected, irrespective of party affiliation.
- In limited voting, it is probable that the party with a plurality secures two seats (reflecting the number of votes each voter has), while the minority party gains the remaining seats.
- Plurality block voting generally results in the party with the most support winning all available seats.
- Limited block approval voting allows independent candidates' supporters to use their additional votes to assist candidates other than their top three choices, possibly leading to a reversal of the outcome observed in plurality block voting.
- Block approval voting permits any popular party-affiliated or independent candidates to be elected, but it's plausible that nearly half of the population might not have a representative elected.

== See also ==
- Voting bloc
- First-past-the-post voting
- Single non-transferable vote
