= 1844 United States presidential election in Maryland =

- November 11, 1844
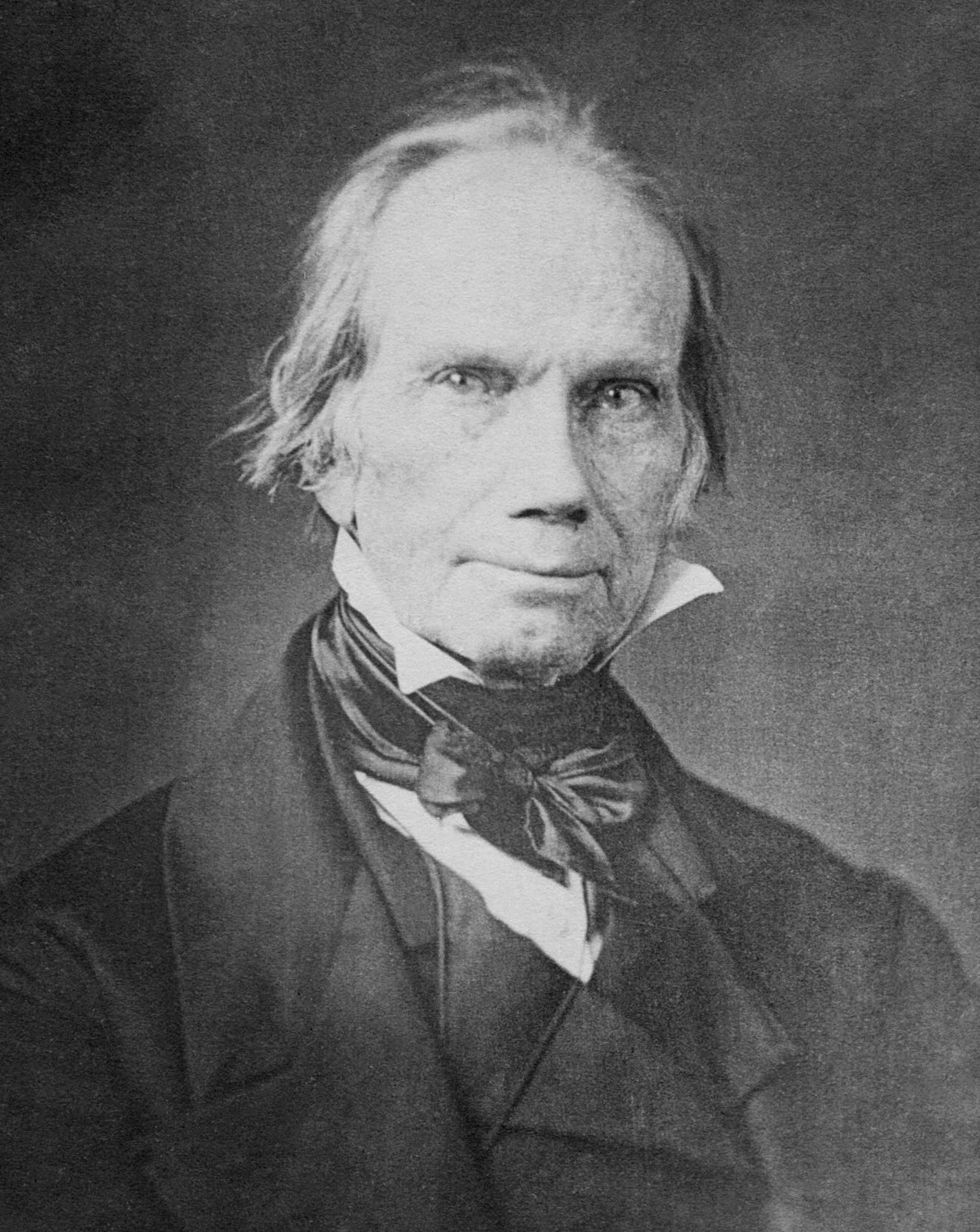

Nominee	Henry Clay	James K. Polk
Party	Whig	Democratic
Home state	Kentucky	Tennessee
Running mate	Theodore Frelinghuysen	George M. Dallas
Electoral vote	8	0
Popular vote	35,984	32,706
Percentage	52.39%	47.61%
County results
Clay
50–60%
60–70%
Polk
50–60%
President before election
John Tyler
Independent
Elected President
James K. Polk
Democratic

The 1844 United States presidential election in Maryland was held on November 11, 1844 as part of the 1844 United States presidential election. Voters chose eight representatives, or electors to the Electoral College, who voted for President and Vice President.

Maryland voted for the Whig candidate, Henry Clay, over Democratic candidate James K. Polk. Clay won Maryland by a margin of 4.78%.

With 52.39% of the popular vote, Maryland would prove to be Henry Clay's fifth strongest state after Rhode Island, Vermont, Kentucky and North Carolina.

== Results ==
1844 United States presidential election in Maryland
Party	Candidate	Running mate	Popular vote		Electoral vote	
Party	Candidate	Running mate	Count	%	Count	%
Whig	Henry Clay of Kentucky	Theodore Frelinghuysen of New York	35,984	52.39%	8	100.00%
Democratic	James K. Polk of Tennessee	George M. Dallas of Pennsylvania	32,706	47.61%	0	0.00%
Total			68,690	100.00%	8	100.00%

=== Results by county ===
County	Henry Clay Whig		James K. Polk Democratic		Margin		Total votes cast
County	#	%	#	%	#	%	Total votes cast
Allegany	1424	48.85%	1491	51.15%	-67	-2.30%	2915
Anne Arundel	1777	54.18%	1503	45.82%	274	8.35%	3280
Baltimore (City and County)	10714	48.01%	11602	51.99%	-888	-3.98%	22316
Calvert	451	56.73%	344	43.27%	107	13.46%	795
Caroline	680	55.19%	552	44.81%	128	10.39%	1232
Carroll	1784	51.29%	1694	48.71%	90	2.59%	3478
Cecil	1527	50.38%	1504	49.62%	23	0.76%	3031
Charles	785	60.20%	519	39.80%	266	20.40%	1304
Dorchester	1377	60.39%	903	39.61%	474	20.79%	2280
Frederick	3190	51.58%	2994	48.42%	270	9.77%	6184
Harford	1517	54.88%	1247	45.12%	270	9.77%	2764
Kent	728	58.01%	527	41.99%	201	16.02%	1255
Montgomery	1124	56.88%	852	43.12%	272	13.77%	1976
Prince George's	1054	61.28%	666	38.72%	388	22.56%	1720
Queen Anne's	749	50.92%	722	49.08%	27	1.84%	1471
St. Mary's	783	62.59%	468	37.41%	315	25.18%	1251
Somerset	1449	61.63%	902	38.37%	547	23.27%	2351
Talbot	795	52.72%	712	47.25%	83	5.51%	1507
Washington	2633	50.65%	2565	49.35%	68	1.31%	5198
Worcester	1453	61.52%	909	38.48%	544	23.03%	2362
Total	35,984	52.39%	32,706	47.61%	3,278	4.78%	68,690

==== Counties that flipped from Whig to Democratic ====
- Allegany

==== Counties that flipped from Democratic to Whig ====
- Carroll

== See also ==
- United States presidential elections in Maryland
- 1844 United States presidential election
- 1844 United States elections
