= 1832 United States presidential election in North Carolina =

- November 2 – December 5, 1832
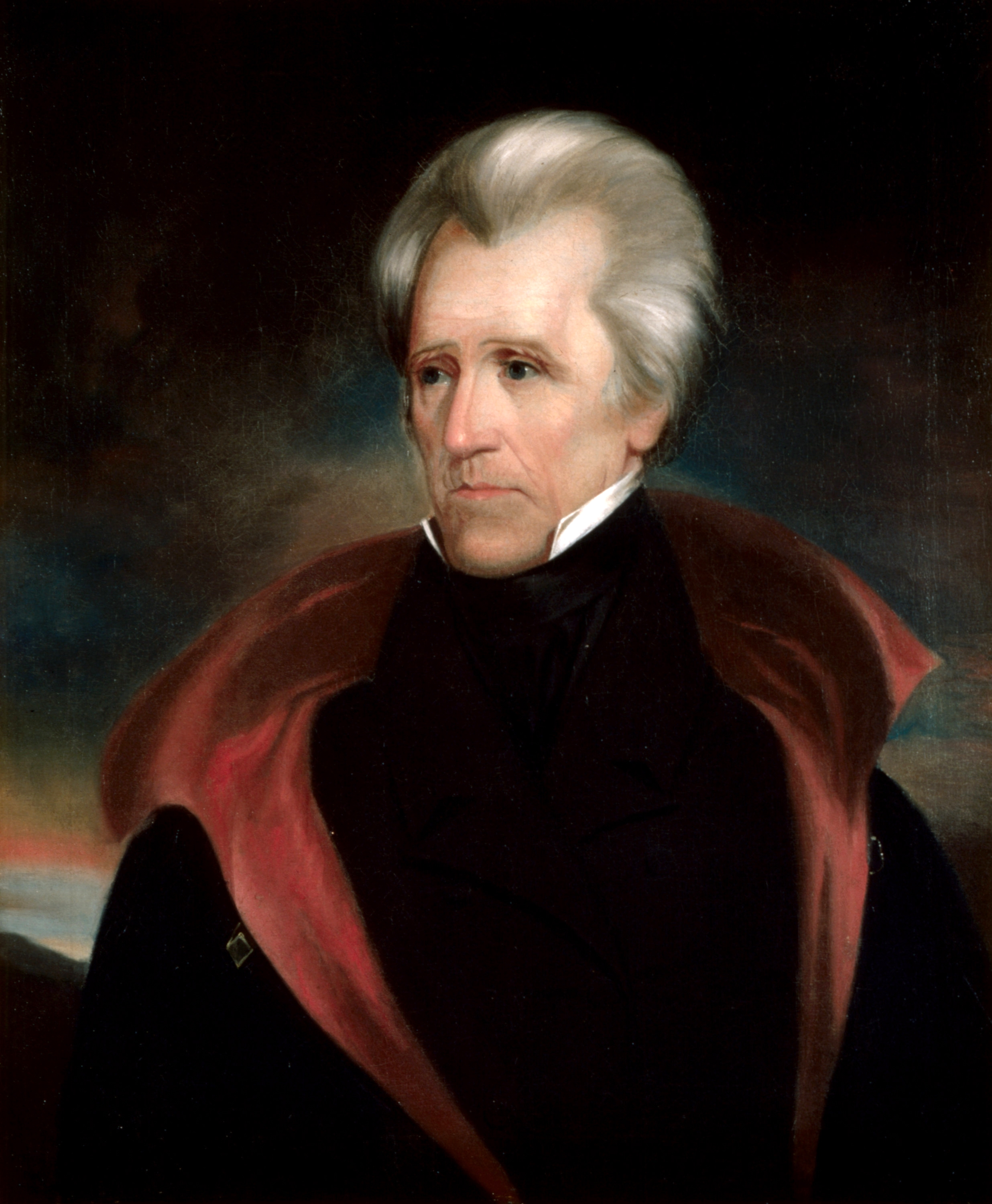

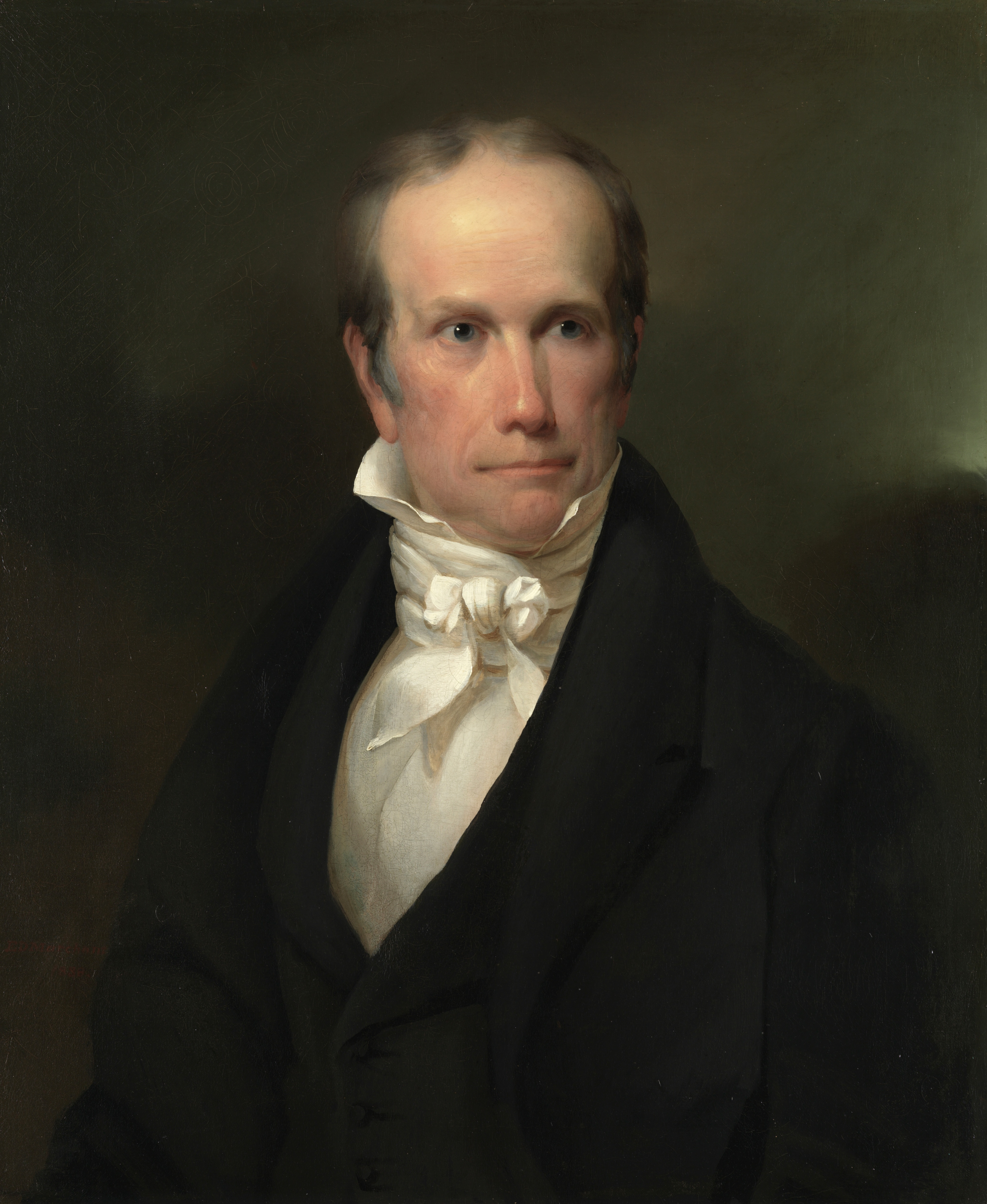
Nominee	Andrew Jackson	Henry Clay
Party	Democratic	National Republican
Home state	Tennessee	Kentucky
Running mate	Martin Van Buren	John Sergeant
Electoral vote	15	0
Popular vote	25,261	4,538
Percentage	84.77%	15.23%
County results
Jackson
40–50%
50–60%
60–70%
70–80%
80–90%
90–100%
Clay
50–60%
Independent Electors
50–60%
60–70%
70–80%

The 1832 United States presidential election in North Carolina took place between November 2 and December 5, 1832, as part of the 1832 United States presidential election. Voters chose 15 representatives, or electors to the Electoral College, who voted for President and Vice President.

North Carolina voted for the Democratic Party candidate, Andrew Jackson, over the National Republican candidate, Henry Clay. Jackson won North Carolina by a margin of 69.54 points. As of the 2024 presidential election, this is the last occasion when Wilkes County voted for a Democratic presidential candidate.

== Results ==
1832 United States presidential election in North Carolina
Party	Candidate	Votes	Percentage	Electoral votes
Democratic	Andrew Jackson (incumbent)	25,261	84.77%	15
National Republican	Henry Clay	4,538	15.23%	0
Totals		29,799	100.0%	15

== See also ==
- United States presidential elections in North Carolina
