= 1852 United States presidential election in North Carolina =

- November 2, 1852

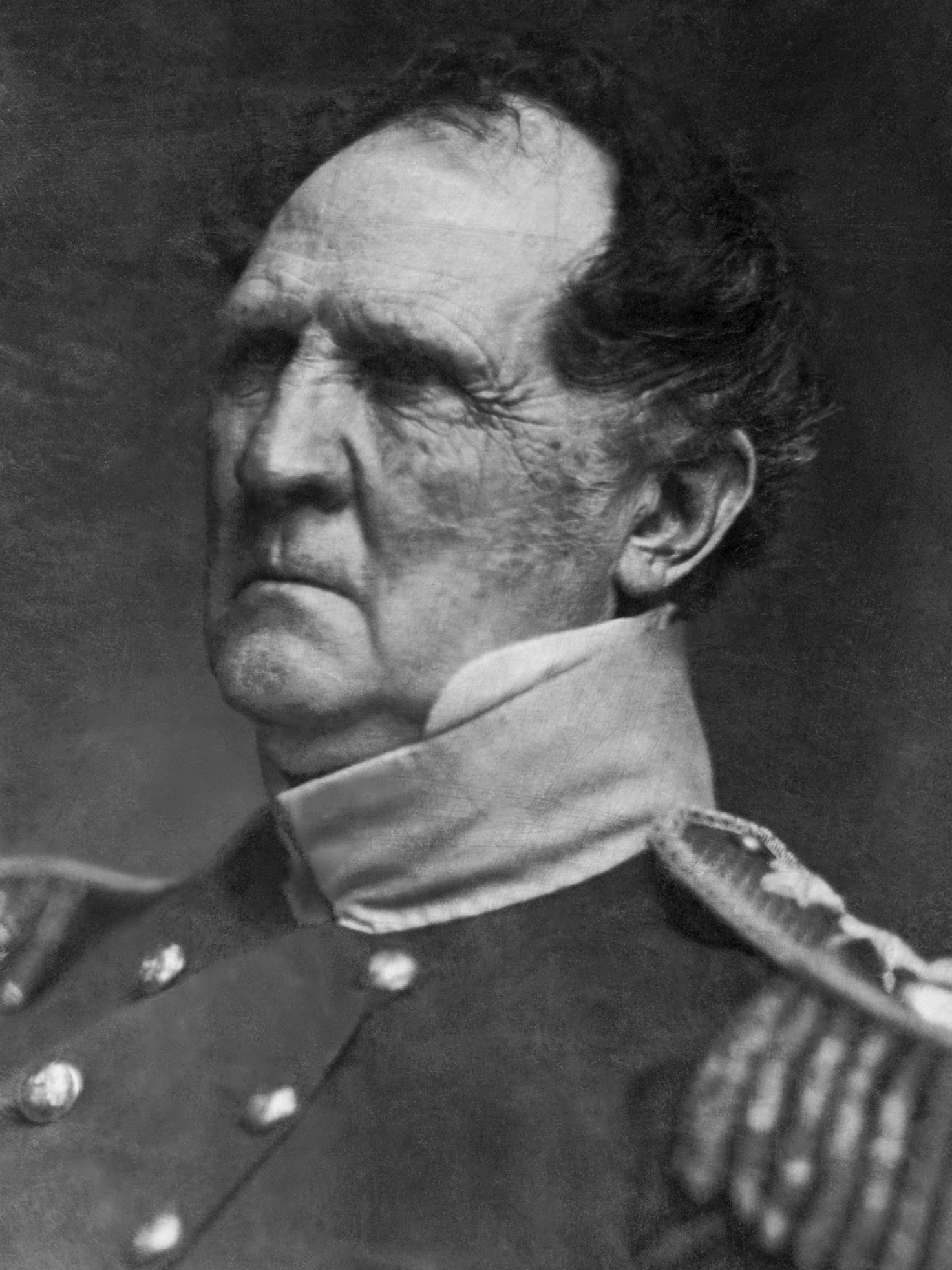
Nominee	Franklin Pierce	Winfield Scott
Party	Democratic	Whig
Home state	New Hampshire	New Jersey
Running mate	William R. King	William Alexander Graham
Electoral vote	10	0
Popular vote	39,788	39,043
Percentage	50.43%	49.49%
County results
Pierce
50–60%
60–70%
70–80%
80–90%
90–100%
Scott
50–60%
60–70%
70–80%
80–90%
90–100%
Tie
50%
No Data/Vote
President before election
Millard Fillmore
Whig
Elected President
Franklin Pierce
Democratic

The 1852 United States presidential election in North Carolina took place on November 2, 1852, as part of the 1852 United States presidential election. Voters chose 10 representatives, or electors to the Electoral College, who voted for President and Vice President.

North Carolina voted for the Democratic candidate, Franklin Pierce, over Whig candidate Winfield Scott. Pierce won North Carolina by a narrow margin of 0.94%.

== Results ==
1852 United States presidential election in North Carolina
Party	Candidate	Running mate	Popular vote		Electoral vote	
Party	Candidate	Running mate	Count	%	Count	%
Democratic	Franklin Pierce of New Hampshire	William R. King of Alabama	39,788	50.43%	10	100.00%
Whig	Winfield Scott of New Jersey	William Alexander Graham of North Carolina	39,043	49.49%	0	0.00%
	Write-in (other)	N/A	60	0.08%	0	0.00%
Total			78,891	100.00%	10	100.00%

== See also ==
- United States presidential elections in North Carolina
