= 1836 United States presidential election in North Carolina =

- November 17, 1836
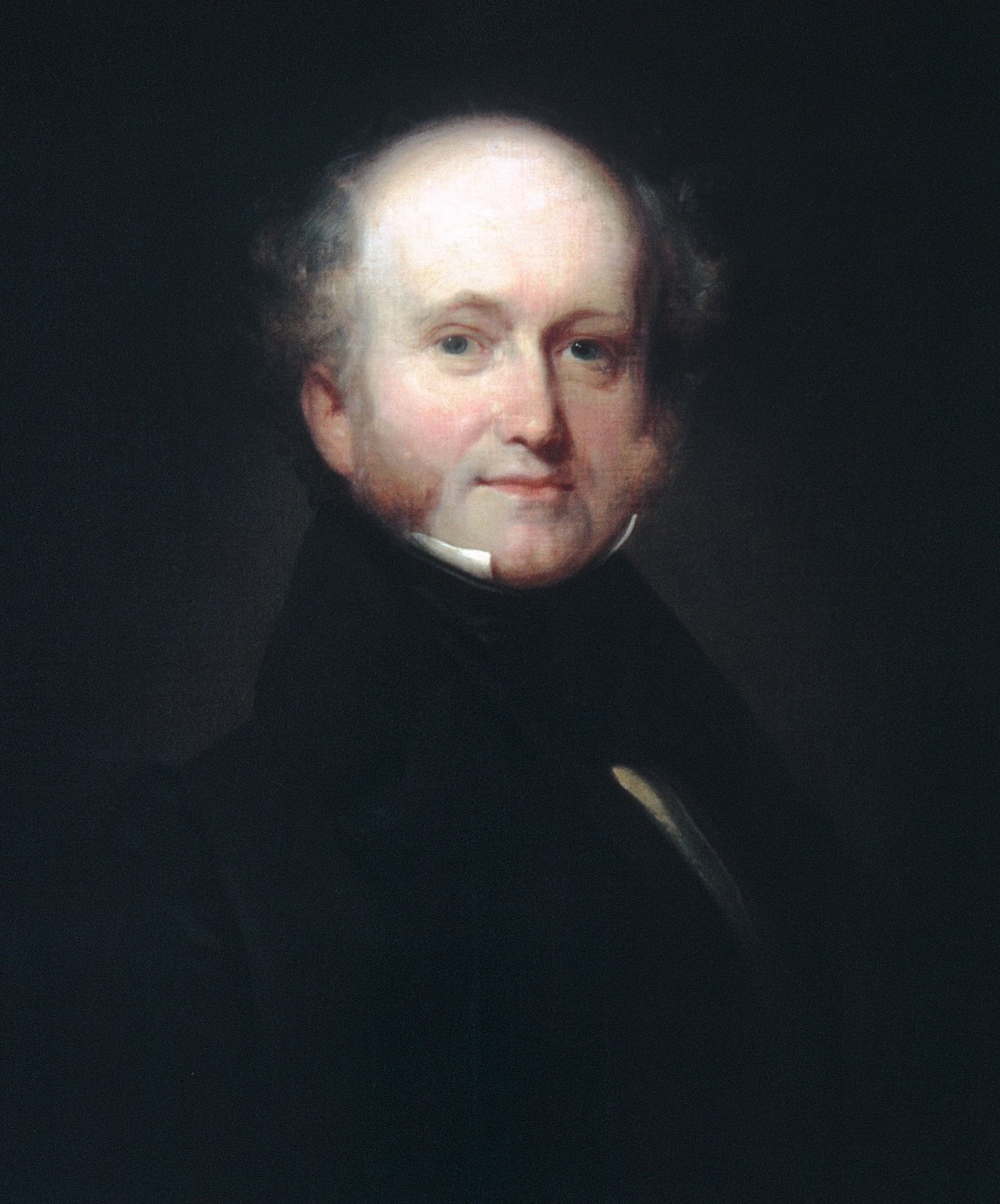

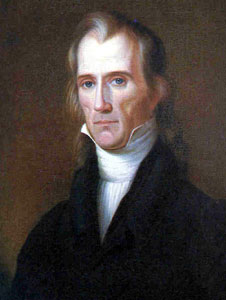
Nominee	Martin Van Buren	Hugh Lawson White
Party	Democratic	Whig
Home state	New York	Tennessee
Running mate	Richard Mentor Johnson	John Tyler
Electoral vote	15	0
Popular vote	26,631	23,531
Percentage	53.10%	46.89%
County results
Van Buren
50–60%
60–70%
70–80%
80–90%
90–100%
White
50–60%
60–70%
70–80%
80–90%
90–100%
President before election
Andrew Jackson
Democratic
Elected President
Martin Van Buren
Democratic

A presidential election was held in North Carolina on November 17, 1836 as part of the 1836 United States presidential election. Voters chose 15 representatives, or electors to the Electoral College, who voted for President and Vice President.

North Carolina voted for the Democratic candidate, Martin Van Buren, over Whig candidate Hugh Lawson White. Van Buren won North Carolina by a margin of 6.21%.

== Results ==
1836 United States presidential election in North Carolina
Party	Candidate	Running mate	Popular vote		Electoral vote	
Party	Candidate	Running mate	Count	%	Count	%
Democratic	Martin Van Buren of New York	Richard Mentor Johnson of Kentucky	26,631	53.10%	15	100.00%
Whig	Hugh Lawson White of Tennessee	John Tyler of Virginia	23,521	46.89%	0	0.00%
N/A	Others	Others	1	0.01%	0	0.00%
Total			50,153	100.00%	15	100.00%

== See also ==
- United States presidential elections in North Carolina
