= 1828 United States presidential election in North Carolina =

- October 31 – December 2, 1828

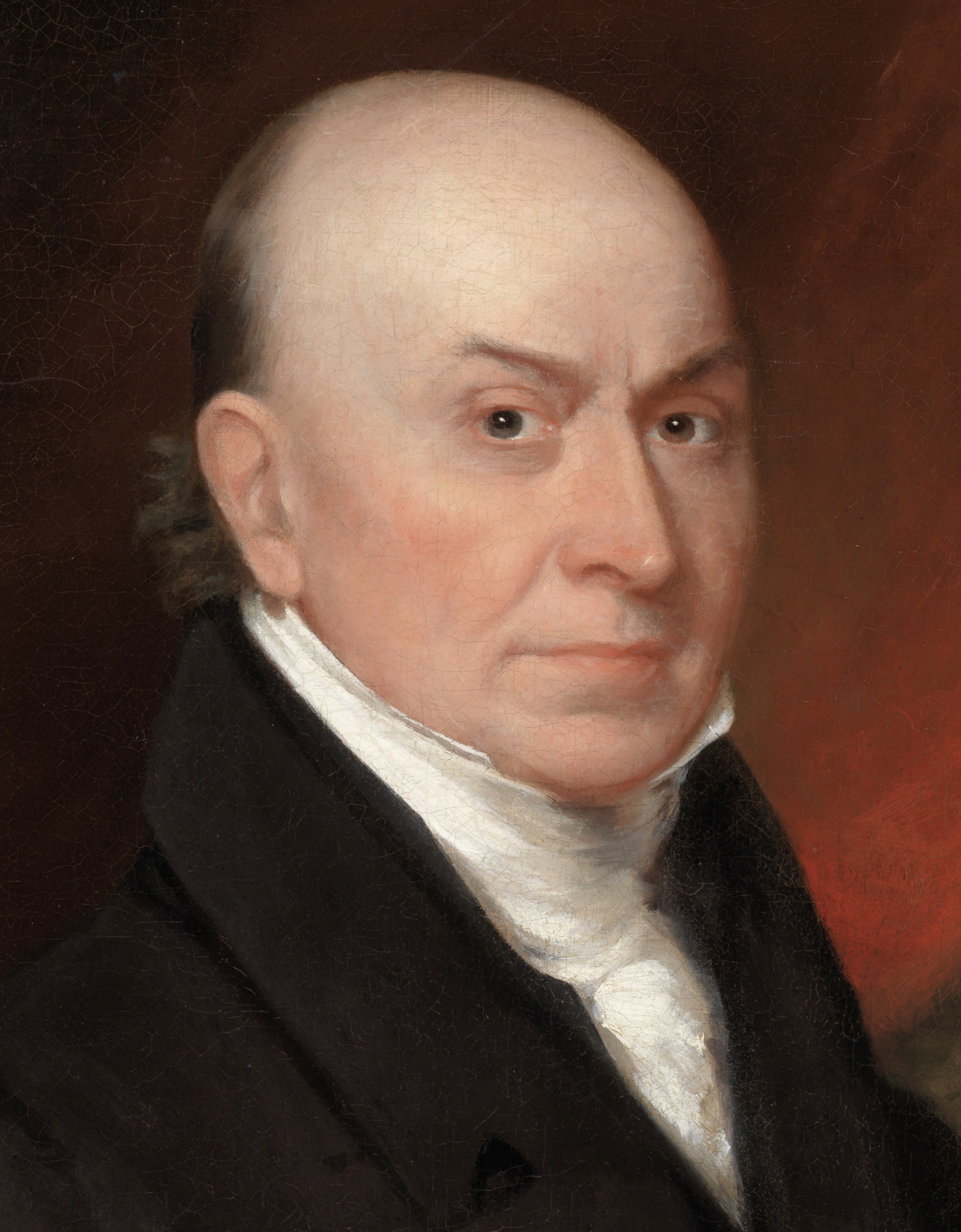
Nominee	Andrew Jackson	John Quincy Adams
Party	Democratic	National Republican
Home state	Tennessee	Massachusetts
Running mate	John C. Calhoun	Richard Rush
Electoral vote	15	0
Popular vote	37,814	13,918
Percentage	73.07%	26.90%
County results
Jackson
50–60%
60–70%
70–80%
80–90%
90–100%
Adams
50–60%
60–70%

The 1828 United States presidential election in North Carolina took place between October 31 and December 2, 1828, as part of the 1828 United States presidential election. Voters chose 15 representatives, or electors to the Electoral College, who voted for President and Vice President.

North Carolina voted for the Democratic candidate, Andrew Jackson, over the National Republican candidate, John Quincy Adams. Jackson won North Carolina by a margin of 46.17%.

== Results ==
1828 United States presidential election in North Carolina
Party	Candidate	Votes	Percentage	Electoral votes
Democratic	Andrew Jackson	37,814	73.07%	15
National Republican	John Quincy Adams (incumbent)	13,918	26.90%	0
N/A	Other	15	0.03%	0
Totals		51,747	100.0%	15

== See also ==
- United States presidential elections in North Carolina
