= 1800 United States presidential election in North Carolina =

- 1800
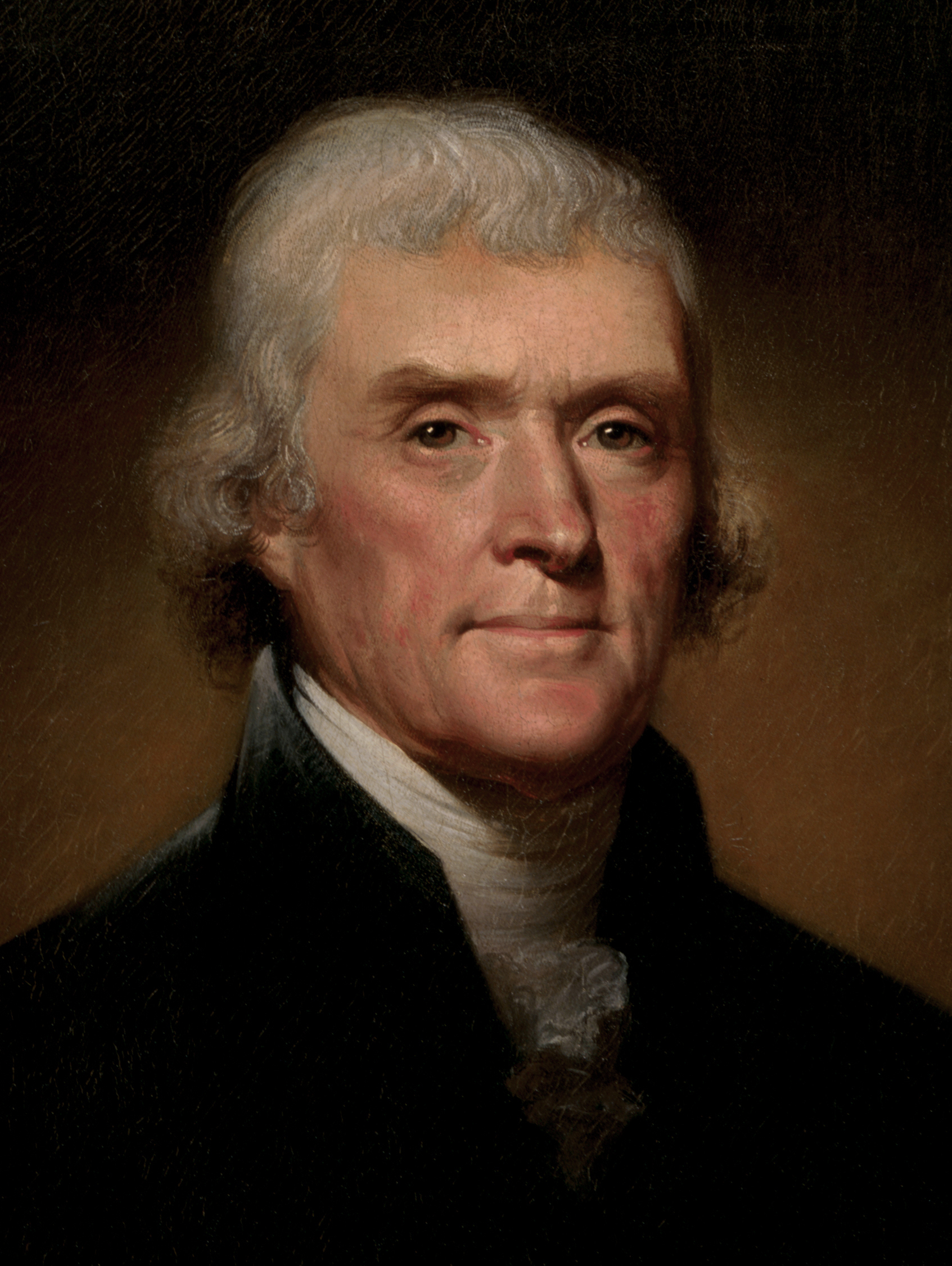

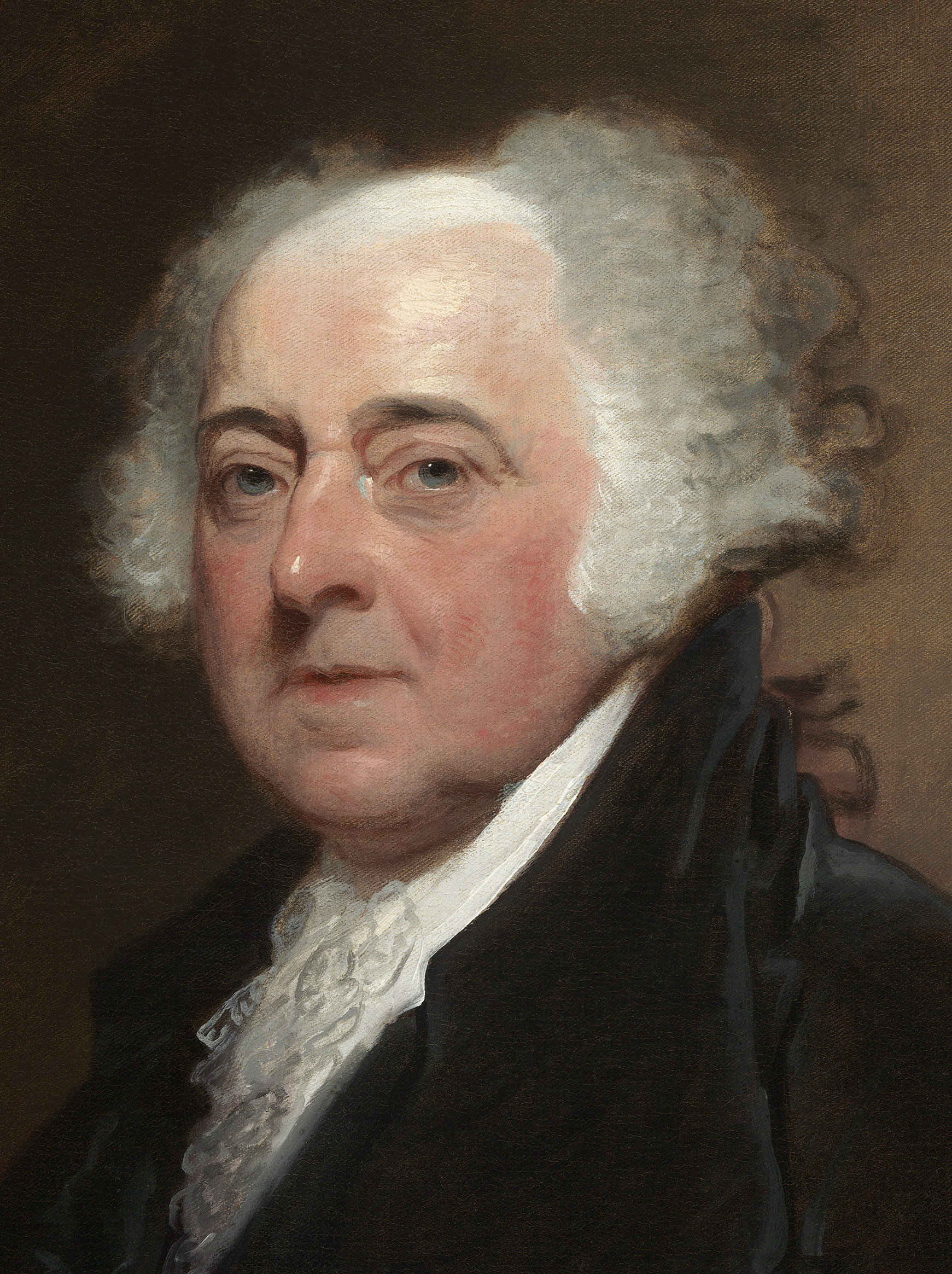
Nominee	Thomas Jefferson	John Adams
Party	Democratic-Republican	Federalist
Home state	Virginia	Massachusetts
Electoral vote	8	4
Popular vote	11,492	10,924
Percentage	51.26%	48.75%
County results
Jefferson
50–60%
60–70%
70–80%
80–90%
90–100%
Adams
50–60%
60–70%
70–80%
80–90%
90–100%
President before election
John Adams
Federalist
Elected President
Thomas Jefferson
Democratic-Republican

North Carolina voted in the 1800 United States presidential election at an unknown date in 1800. Voters chose twelve representatives, or electors, to the Electoral College, who voted for president and vice president.

North Carolina voted for the Democratic-Republican candidate, Thomas Jefferson, over the Federalist candidate, John Adams. Jefferson won North Carolina by a margin of 2.6%, taking eight of its twelve electoral votes.

North Carolina used an electoral district system to choose its electors, with each district electing a single elector. This is similar to the way Nebraska and Maine choose their electors in modern elections. While it is known that the elector from the Edenton district voted for Thomas Jefferson and Aaron Burr, the county level results have been lost.

== Results ==
1800 United States presidential election in North Carolina
Party	Candidate	Votes	Percentage	Electoral votes
Democratic-Republican	Thomas Jefferson	11,492	51.26%	8
Federalist	John Adams	10,924	48.75%	4
Totals		4,512	100.00%	12

=== Results by county ===
1800 United States presidential election in North Carolina
County	John Adams Federalist		Thomas Jefferson Democratic-Republican		Margin		Total votes
County	#	%	#	%	#	%	Total votes
Anson	321	93.04%	24	6.96%	297	86.08%	345
Ashe	0	0.00%	62	100.00%	-62	-100.00%	62
Beaufort	156	34.59%	295	65.41%	-139	-30.82%	451
Bertie	29	9.76%	268	90.24%	-239	-80.48%	297
Bladen	341	98.27%	6	1.73%	335	96.54%	347
Brunswick	188	80.34%	46	19.66%	142	60.68%	234
Buncombe	26	14.29%	156	85.71%	-130	-71.42%	182
Burke	122	22.22%	427	77.78%	-305	-55.56%	549
Cabarrus	139	57.92%	101	42.08%	30	15.84%	240
Camden	-	0.00%	-	100.00%	-	-100.00%	-
Carteret	147	91.30%	14	8.70%	133	82.60%	161
Caswell	13	2.40%	528	97.60%	-515	95.20%	541
Chatham	231	36.78%	397	63.22%	-166	-26.44%	628
Chowan	-	0.00%	-	100.00%	-	-100.00%	-
Craven	331	52.37%	301	47.63%	30	4.74%	632
Cumberland	528	79.52%	136	20.48%	392	59.04%	664
Currituck	-	0.00%	-	100.00%	-	-100.00%	-
Duplin	134	28.27%	340	71.73%	-206	-43.46%	474
Edgecombe	202	47.64%	222	52.36%	-20	-4.72%	424
Franklin	68	23.29%	224	76.71%	-156	-53.42%	292
Gates	-	0.00%	-	100.00%	-	-100.00%	-
Granville	187	33.04%	379	66.96%	-192	-33.92%	566
Greene	245	84.48%	45	15.52%	200	68.96%	290
Guilford	357	75.48%	116	24.52%	241	50.96%	473
Halifax	209	30.96%	466	69.04%	-257	-38.08%	675
Hertford	115	34.43%	219	65.57%	-104	-31.14%	334
Hyde	224	57.88%	163	42.12%	61	15.76%	387
Iredell	461	90.57%	48	9.43%	413	81.14%	509
Johnston	168	64.62%	92	35.38%	76	29.24%	260
Jones	142	62.01%	87	37.99%	55	24.02%	229
Lenoir	122	34.96%	227	65.04%	-105	-30.08%	349
Lincoln	240	95.62%	11	4.38%	229	91.24%	251
Martin	276	79.31%	72	20.69%	204	58.62%	348
Mecklenburg	274	48.41%	292	51.59%	-18	-3.18%	566
Montgomery	277	83.69%	54	16.31%	223	67.38%	331
Moore	525	98.87%	6	1.13%	519	97.74%	531
Nash	47	31.76%	101	68.24%	-54	-36.48%	148
New Hanover	223	48.37%	238	51.63%	-15	-3.26%	461
Northampton	281	64.30%	156	35.70%	125	28.60%	437
Onslow	249	77.81%	71	22.19%	178	55.62%	320
Orange	374	39.91%	563	60.09%	-189	-20.18%	937
Pasquotank	-	0.00%	-	100.00%	-	-100.00%	-
Perquimans	-	0.00%	-	100.00%	-	-100.00%	-
Person	62	20.46%	241	79.54%	-179	-59.08%	303
Pitt	388	64.99%	209	35.01%	179	29.98%	597
Randolph	25	15.43%	137	84.57%	-112	-69.14%	162
Richmond	322	89.44%	38	10.56%	284	78.88%	360
Robeson	172	74.14%	60	25.86%	112	48.28%	232
Rockingham	58	10.74%	482	89.26%	-424	-78.52%	540
Rowan	643	53.32%	563	46.68%	80	6.64%	1,206
Rutherford	60	14.25%	361	85.75%	-301	-71.50%	421
Sampson	260	88.14%	35	11.86%	225	76.28%	295
Stokes	422	56.64%	323	43.36%	99	13.28%	745
Surry	202	30.10%	469	69.90%	-267	-39.80%	671
Tyrrell	-	0.00%	-	100.00%	-	-100.00%	-
Wake	266	46.83%	302	53.17%	-36	-6.34%	568
Warren	14	2.49%	549	97.51%	-535	-95.02%	563
Washington	-	0.00%	-	100.00%	-	-100.00%	-
Wayne	22	5.06%	413	94.94%	-391	-89.88%	435
Wilkes	36	9.16%	357	90.84%	-321	-81.68%	393
Total	10,924	48.73%	11,492	51.27%	-568	-2.54%	22,416

=== Results by district ===
	Thomas Jefferson Democratic-Republican		John Adams Federalist		Margin		District total	Citation
District	#	%	#	%	#	%	#	
Edenton (Note: Results from the Edenton district appear to have been lost. The district chose an elector who voted for Thomas Jefferson and Aaron Burr.)	No data		No data		No data		No data	
Edgecombe	1,035	44.02	1,316	55.98	-281	-11.96	2,351	
Fayetteville	299	12.32	2,128	87.68	-1,829	-75.36	2,427	
Hilsborough	1,344	63.61	769	36.39	575	27.22	2,113	
Morgan	1,374	73.95	484	26.05	890	47.90	1,858	
New Bern	1,134	54.89	932	45.11	202	9.78	2,066	
Northampton	715	50.49	701	49.51	14	0.98	1,416	
Raleigh	1,319	63.87	746	36.13	573	27.74	2,065	
Rockingham	1,322	53.63	1,143	46.37	179	7.26	2,465	
Salisbury	1,010	43.11	1,333	56.89	-323	-13.78	2,343	
Warren	1,340	79.86	338	20.14	1,002	59.72	1,678	
Wilmington	701	38.18	1,135	61.82	-434	-23.64	1,836	

== See also ==
- United States presidential elections in North Carolina
- 1800 United States presidential election
- 1800 United States elections
