= 1824 United States presidential election in North Carolina =

- October 26 – December 2, 1824
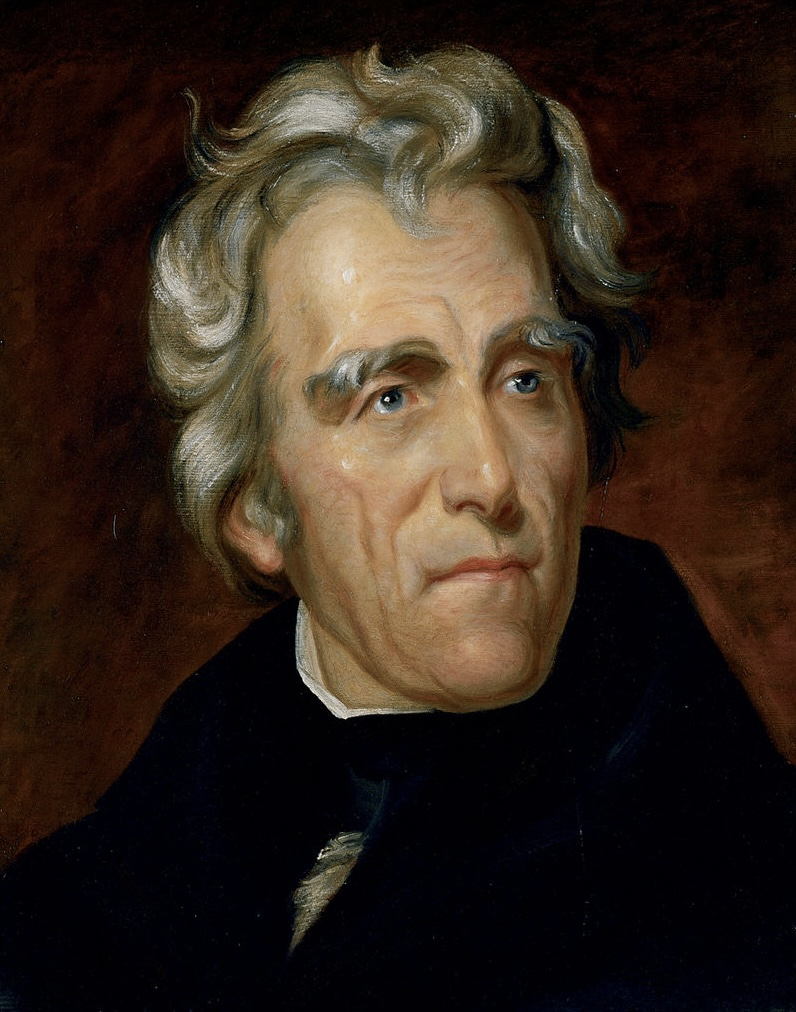

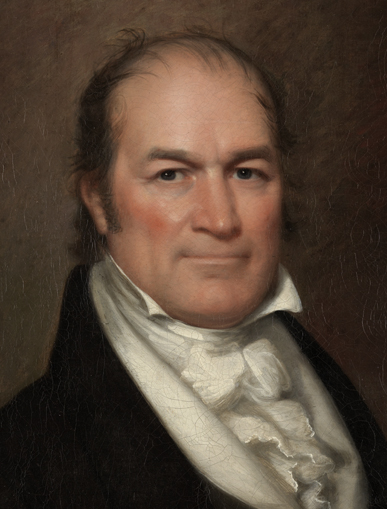
Nominee	Andrew Jackson	William H. Crawford
Party	Democratic-Republican	Democratic-Republican
Home state	Tennessee	Georgia
Running mate	John C. Calhoun	Nathaniel Macon
Electoral vote	15	0
Popular vote	20,231	15,622
Percentage	56.03%	43.26%
County results
Jackson
50–60%
60–70%
70–80%
80–90%
90–100%
Crawford
50–60%
60–70%
70–80%
80–90%
90–100%
President before election
James Monroe
Democratic-Republican
Elected President
John Quincy Adams
Democratic-Republican

The 1824 United States presidential election in North Carolina took place between October 26 and December 2, 1824, as part of the 1824 United States presidential election. Voters chose 15 representatives, or electors to the Electoral College, who voted for President and Vice President.

During this election, the Democratic-Republican Party was the only major national party, and four different candidates from this party sought the Presidency. North Carolina voted for Andrew Jackson over William H. Crawford, Henry Clay, and John Quincy Adams. Jackson won North Carolina by a margin of 12.77%.

== Results ==
1824 United States presidential election in North Carolina
Party	Candidate	Votes	Percentage	Electoral votes
Democratic-Republican	Andrew Jackson	20,231	56.03%	15
Democratic-Republican	William H. Crawford	15,622	43.26%	0
N/A	Others	256	0.71%	0
Totals		36,109	100.0%	15

== See also ==
- United States presidential elections in North Carolina
