= 1876 United States presidential election in North Carolina =

- November 7, 1876
- Turnout: 21.83% ▲6.41 pp
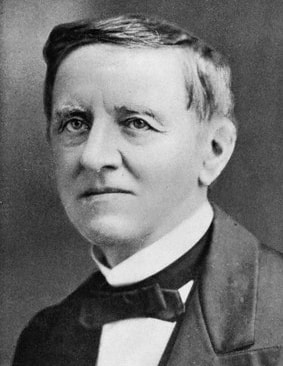

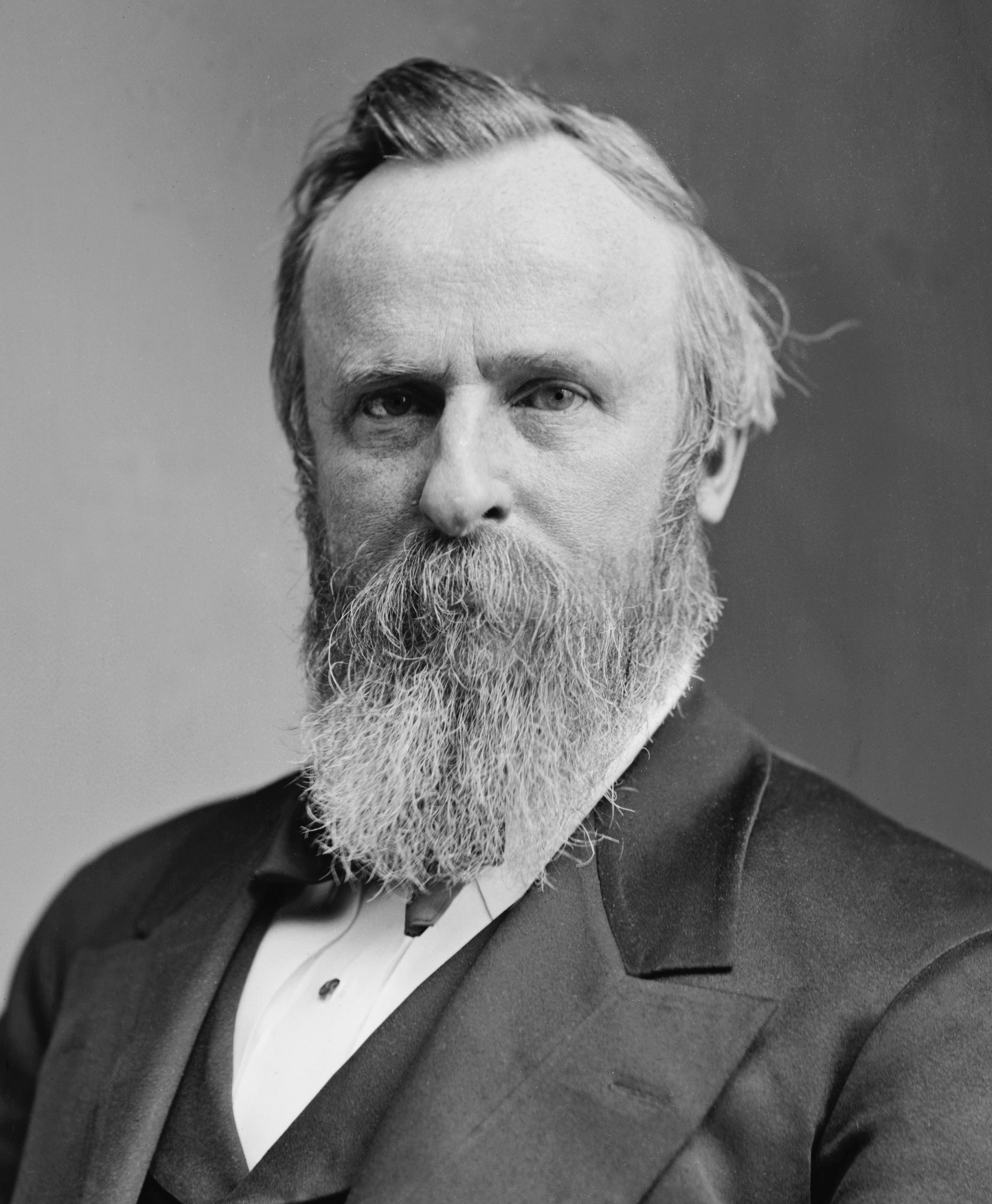
Nominee	Samuel J. Tilden	Rutherford B. Hayes
Party	Democratic	Republican
Home state	New York	Ohio
Running mate	Thomas A. Hendricks	William A. Wheeler
Electoral vote	10	0
Popular vote	125,427	108,484
Percentage	53.62%	46.38%
County results
Tilden
50–60%
60–70%
70–80%
80–90%
90–100%
Hayes
50–60%
60–70%
President before election
Ulysses S. Grant
Republican
Elected President
Rutherford B. Hayes
Republican

The 1876 United States presidential election in North Carolina took place on November 7, 1876, as part of the 1876 United States presidential election. State voters chose 10 representatives, or electors, to the Electoral College, who voted for the president and vice president.

North Carolina was won by Samuel J. Tilden, the former governor of New York (D–New York), running with Thomas A. Hendricks, the governor of Indiana and future vice president, with 53.62% of the popular vote, against Rutherford B. Hayes, the governor of Ohio (R-Ohio), running with Representative William A. Wheeler, with 46.38% of the vote.

This is the only occasion when Unionist, high-altitude Mitchell County has ever voted for a Democratic presidential candidate.

== Results ==
1876 United States presidential election in North Carolina
Party	Candidate	Running mate	Popular vote		Electoral vote	
Party	Candidate	Running mate	Count	%	Count	%
Democratic	Samuel J. Tilden of New York	Thomas A. Hendricks of Indiana	125,427	53.62%	10	100.00%
Republican	Rutherford B. Hayes of Ohio	William A. Wheeler of New York	108,484	46.38%	0	0.00%
Total			233,911	100.00%	10	100.00%

=== Results by county ===
County	Samuel J. Tilden Democratic		Rutherford B. Hayes Republican		Margin	
County	%	#	%	#	%	#
Swain	90.71%	410	9.29%	42	81.42%	368
Catawba	80.78%	1,874	19.22%	446	61.55%	1,428
Caldwell	80.66%	1,193	19.34%	286	61.33%	907
Cleveland	78.55%	1,769	21.45%	483	57.10%	1,286
Alleghany	77.84%	527	22.16%	150	55.69%	377
Macon	73.19%	770	26.81%	282	46.39%	488
Watauga	71.63%	712	28.37%	282	43.26%	430
Jackson	71.41%	652	28.59%	261	42.83%	391
Currituck	71.37%	992	28.63%	398	42.73%	594
Alexander	71.09%	846	28.91%	344	42.18%	502
Onslow	70.54%	1,317	29.46%	550	41.08%	767
Haywood	70.29%	1,010	29.71%	427	40.57%	583
Stanly	69.15%	957	30.85%	427	38.29%	530
Yancey	69.01%	746	30.99%	335	38.02%	411
Union	68.25%	1,556	31.75%	724	36.49%	832
Tyrrell	68.20%	549	31.80%	256	36.40%	293
Burke	67.76%	1,215	32.24%	578	35.53%	637
Transylvania	66.04%	459	33.96%	236	32.09%	223
Iredell	65.96%	2,407	34.04%	1,242	31.93%	1,165
Columbus	65.02%	1,431	34.98%	770	30.03%	661
Rowan	64.10%	2,189	35.90%	1,226	28.20%	963
Gates	64.01%	909	35.99%	511	28.03%	398
Lincoln	63.95%	1,130	36.05%	637	27.90%	493
McDowell	63.94%	963	36.06%	543	27.89%	420
Cabarrus	63.90%	1,641	36.10%	927	27.80%	714
Duplin	63.66%	2,195	36.34%	1,253	27.32%	942
Clay	63.13%	315	36.87%	184	26.25%	131
Buncombe	62.67%	1,991	37.33%	1,186	25.34%	805
Carteret	61.83%	1,150	38.17%	710	23.66%	440
Gaston	60.53%	1,250	39.47%	815	21.07%	435
Wilson	60.38%	1,771	39.62%	1,162	20.76%	609
Davidson	60.30%	1,782	39.70%	1,173	20.61%	609
Davie	59.61%	1,036	40.39%	702	19.22%	334
Orange	59.28%	2,428	40.72%	1,668	18.55%	760
Harnett	59.25%	1,070	40.75%	736	18.49%	334
Pamlico	59.22%	745	40.78%	513	18.44%	232
Rockingham	58.99%	2,155	41.01%	1,498	17.99%	657
Hyde	57.79%	898	42.21%	656	15.57%	242
Mitchell	57.24%	747	42.76%	558	14.48%	189
Surry	57.19%	1,352	42.81%	1,012	14.38%	340
Ashe	56.71%	1,077	43.29%	822	13.43%	255
Johnston	56.38%	2,174	43.62%	1,682	12.76%	492
Mecklenburg	56.33%	3,417	43.67%	2,649	12.66%	768
Dare	56.27%	305	43.73%	237	12.55%	68
Nash	56.12%	1,716	43.88%	1,342	12.23%	374
Cherokee	56.11%	680	43.89%	532	12.21%	148
Sampson	55.75%	2,100	44.25%	1,667	11.49%	433
Stokes	55.50%	1,222	44.50%	980	10.99%	242
Camden	55.13%	683	44.87%	556	10.25%	127
Person	55.05%	1,211	44.95%	989	10.09%	222
Robeson	54.90%	2,117	45.10%	1,739	9.80%	378
Anson	54.84%	1,599	45.16%	1,317	9.67%	282
Polk	54.40%	408	45.60%	342	8.80%	66
Guilford	54.25%	2,334	45.75%	1,968	8.51%	366
Martin	53.70%	1,334	46.30%	1,150	7.41%	184
Rutherford	53.52%	1,278	46.48%	1,110	7.04%	168
Chatham	53.38%	2,141	46.62%	1,870	6.76%	271
Moore	53.15%	1,365	46.85%	1,203	6.31%	162
Randolph	53.06%	1,775	46.94%	1,570	6.13%	205
Pitt	52.99%	2,136	47.01%	1,895	5.98%	241
Beaufort	52.76%	1,723	47.24%	1,543	5.51%	180
Madison	52.43%	895	47.57%	812	4.86%	83
Cumberland	51.23%	2,230	48.77%	2,123	2.46%	107
Wayne	51.07%	2,284	48.93%	2,188	2.15%	96
Henderson	50.94%	784	49.06%	755	1.88%	29
Bladen	50.13%	1,397	49.87%	1,390	0.25%	7
Forsyth	49.45%	1,496	50.55%	1,529	-1.09%	-33
Granville	49.43%	2,047	50.57%	2,094	-1.13%	-47
Franklin	49.38%	1,873	50.62%	1,920	-1.24%	-47
Wake	49.28%	4,315	50.72%	4,441	-1.44%	-126
Alamance	49.03%	1,391	50.97%	1,446	-1.94%	-55
Brunswick	48.97%	1,002	51.03%	1,044	-2.05%	-42
Hertford	48.55%	1,020	51.45%	1,081	-2.90%	-61
Pender	48.35%	1,172	51.65%	1,252	-3.30%	-80
Richmond	48.11%	1,350	51.89%	1,456	-3.78%	-106
Wilkes	47.91%	1,384	52.09%	1,505	-4.19%	-121
Caswell	47.78%	1,493	52.22%	1,632	-4.45%	-139
Montgomery	46.32%	648	53.68%	751	-7.36%	-103
Greene	45.64%	896	54.36%	1,067	-8.71%	-171
Yadkin	45.45%	905	54.55%	1,086	-9.09%	-181
Perquimans	44.92%	832	55.08%	1,020	-10.15%	-188
Lenoir	44.63%	1,214	55.37%	1,506	-10.74%	-292
Chowan	43.83%	629	56.17%	806	-12.33%	-177
Jones	42.70%	597	57.30%	801	-14.59%	-204
Pasquotank	40.96%	849	59.04%	1,224	-18.09%	-375
Washington	40.78%	692	59.22%	1,005	-18.44%	-313
Bertie	40.49%	1,126	59.51%	1,655	-19.02%	-529
Northampton	39.39%	1,424	60.61%	2,191	-21.22%	-767
New Hanover	35.31%	1,634	64.69%	2,994	-29.39%	-1,360
Warren	34.67%	1,326	65.33%	2,499	-30.67%	-1,173
Halifax	34.28%	1,683	65.72%	3,226	-31.43%	-1,543
Craven	32.10%	1,289	67.90%	2,727	-35.81%	-1,438
Edgecombe	30.07%	1,652	69.93%	3,841	-39.85%	-2,189
Totals (Note: No returns were canvassed for Graham County and voters in this county were presumably listed in neighbouring counties.)	53.62%	125,427	46.38%	108,484	7.24%	16,943

== See also ==
- United States presidential elections in North Carolina
