= 1856 United States presidential election in North Carolina =

- November 4, 1856
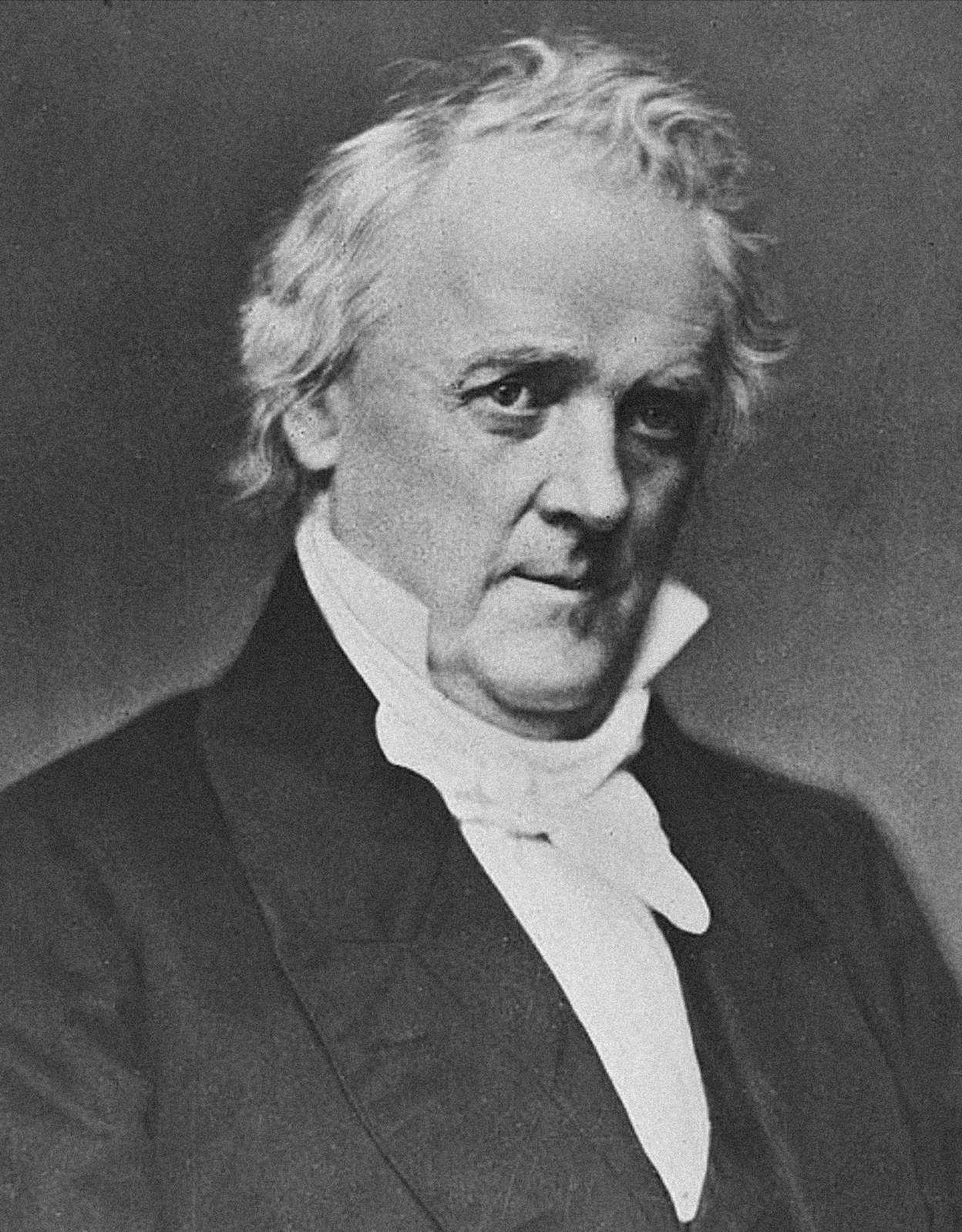

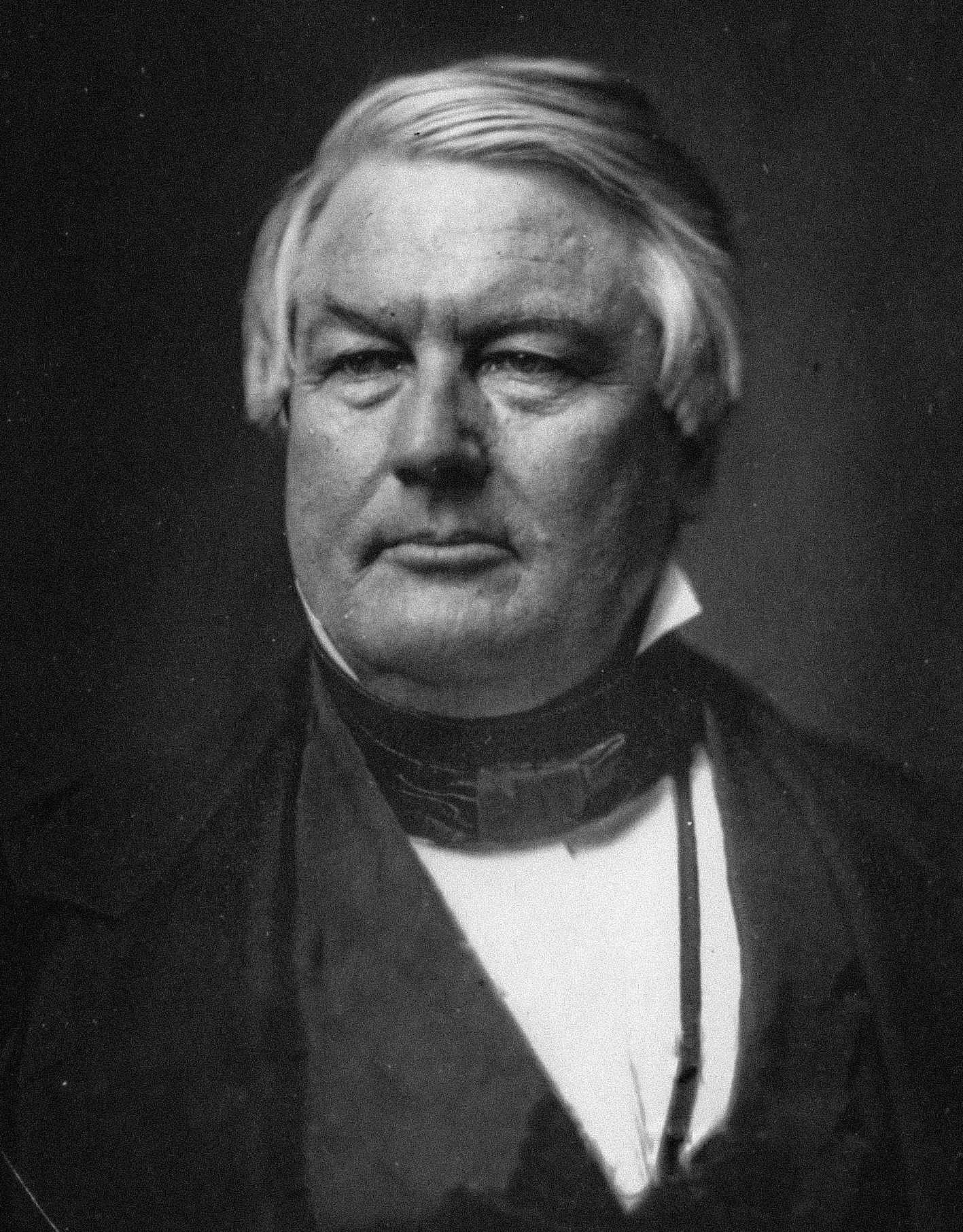
Nominee	James Buchanan	Millard Fillmore
Party	Democratic	Whig
Home state	Pennsylvania	New York
Running mate	John C. Breckinridge	Andrew Jackson Donelson
Electoral vote	10	0
Popular vote	48,243	36,720
Percentage	56.78%	43.22%
County results
Buchanan
50–60%
60–70%
70–80%
80–90%
90–100%
Fillmore
50–60%
60–70%
70–80%
80–90%
President before election
Franklin Pierce
Democratic
Elected President
James Buchanan
Democratic

The 1856 United States presidential election in North Carolina took place on November 4, 1856, as part of the 1856 United States presidential election. Voters chose 10 representatives, or electors to the Electoral College, who voted for president and vice president.

North Carolina voted for the Democratic candidate, James Buchanan, over Whig candidate Millard Fillmore. Fillmore ran under the American Party ticket in most states, but ran as a Whig in North Carolina after receiving the endorsement of the party at the 1856 Whig National Convention. Buchanan won North Carolina by a margin of 13.56%.

Republican Party candidate John C. Frémont was not on the ballot in the state.

== Results ==
1856 United States presidential election in North Carolina
Party	Candidate	Running mate	Popular vote		Electoral vote	
Party	Candidate	Running mate	Count	%	Count	%
Democratic	James Buchanan of Pennsylvania	John C. Breckinridge of Kentucky	48,243	56.78%	10	100.00%
Whig	Millard Fillmore of New York	Andrew Jackson Donelson of Tennessee	36,720	43.22%	0	0.00%
Total			84,963	100.00%	10	100.00%

== See also ==
- United States presidential elections in North Carolina
