= 1848 United States presidential election in North Carolina =

- November 7, 1848
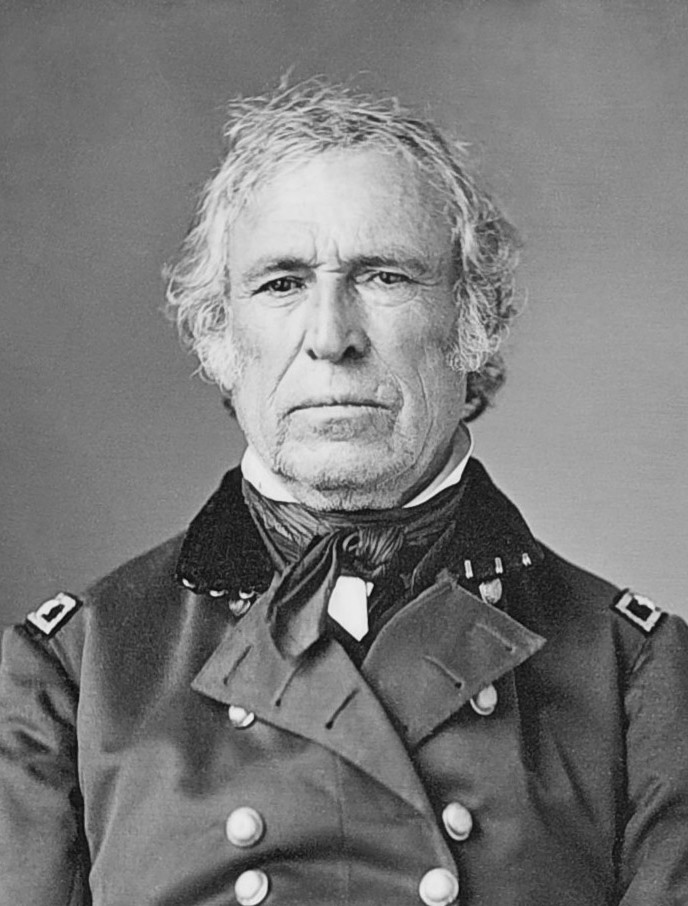

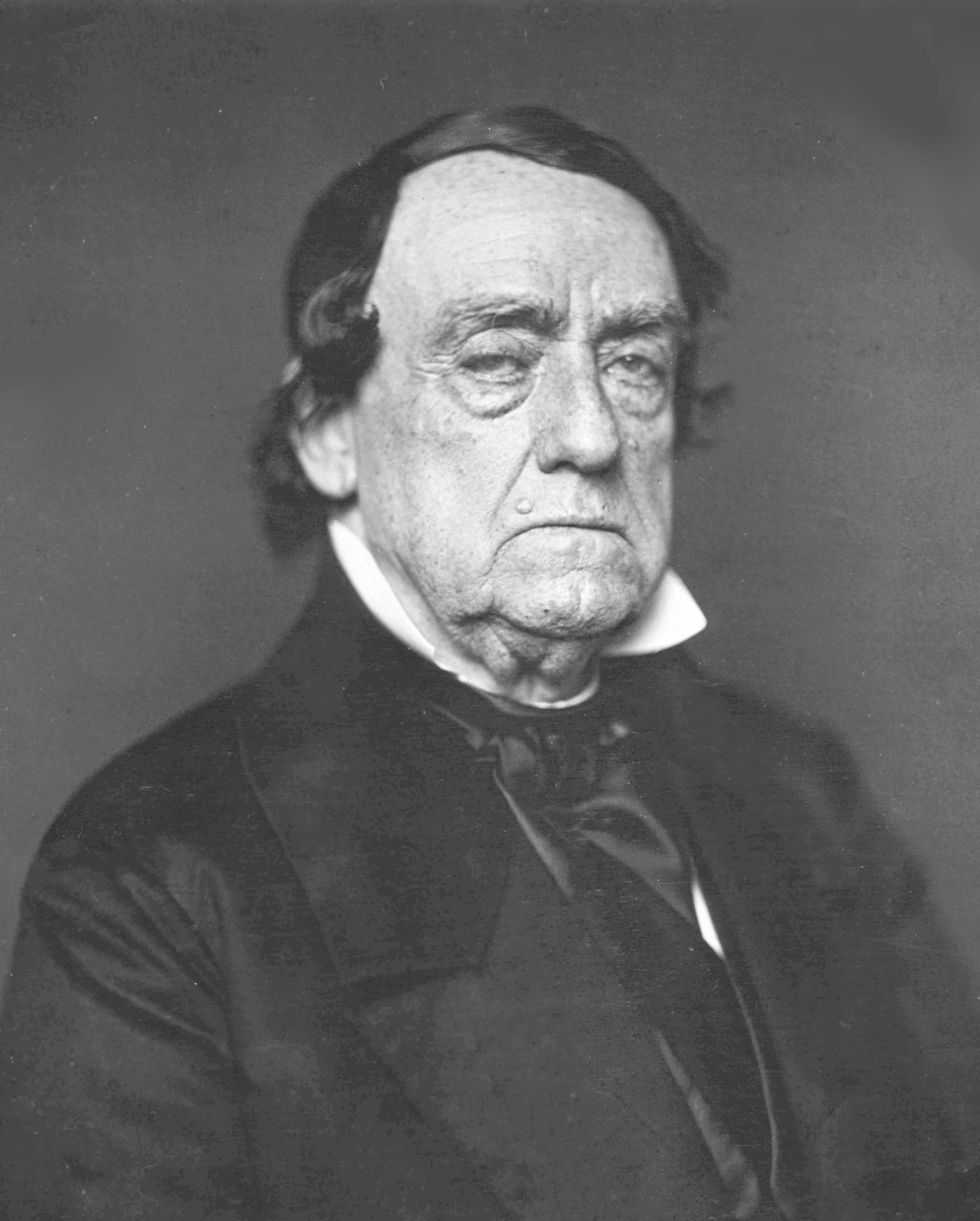
Nominee	Zachary Taylor	Lewis Cass
Party	Whig	Democratic
Home state	Louisiana	Michigan
Running mate	Millard Fillmore	William O. Butler
Electoral vote	11	0
Popular vote	45,054	35,772
Percentage	55.17%	44.80%
County results
Taylor
50–60%
60–70%
70–80%
80–90%
90–100%
Cass
50–60%
60–70%
70–80%
80–90%
90–100%
President before election
James K. Polk
Democratic
Elected President
Zachary Taylor
Whig

The 1848 United States presidential election in North Carolina took place on November 7, 1848, as part of the 1848 United States presidential election. Voters chose 11 representatives, or electors to the Electoral College, who voted for President and Vice President.

North Carolina voted for the Whig candidate Zachary Taylor over Democratic candidate Lewis Cass. Taylor won North Carolina by a margin of 10.37%.

== Results ==
1848 United States presidential election in North Carolina
Party	Candidate	Running mate	Popular vote		Electoral vote	
Party	Candidate	Running mate	Count	%	Count	%
Whig	Zachary Taylor of Louisiana	Millard Fillmore of New York	44,054	55.17%	11	100.00%
Democratic	Lewis Cass of Michigan	William O. Butler of Kentucky	35,772	44.80%	0	0.00%
Total			79,826	100.00%	11	100.00%

== See also ==
- United States presidential elections in North Carolina
