= 1872 United States presidential election in North Carolina =

- November 5, 1872
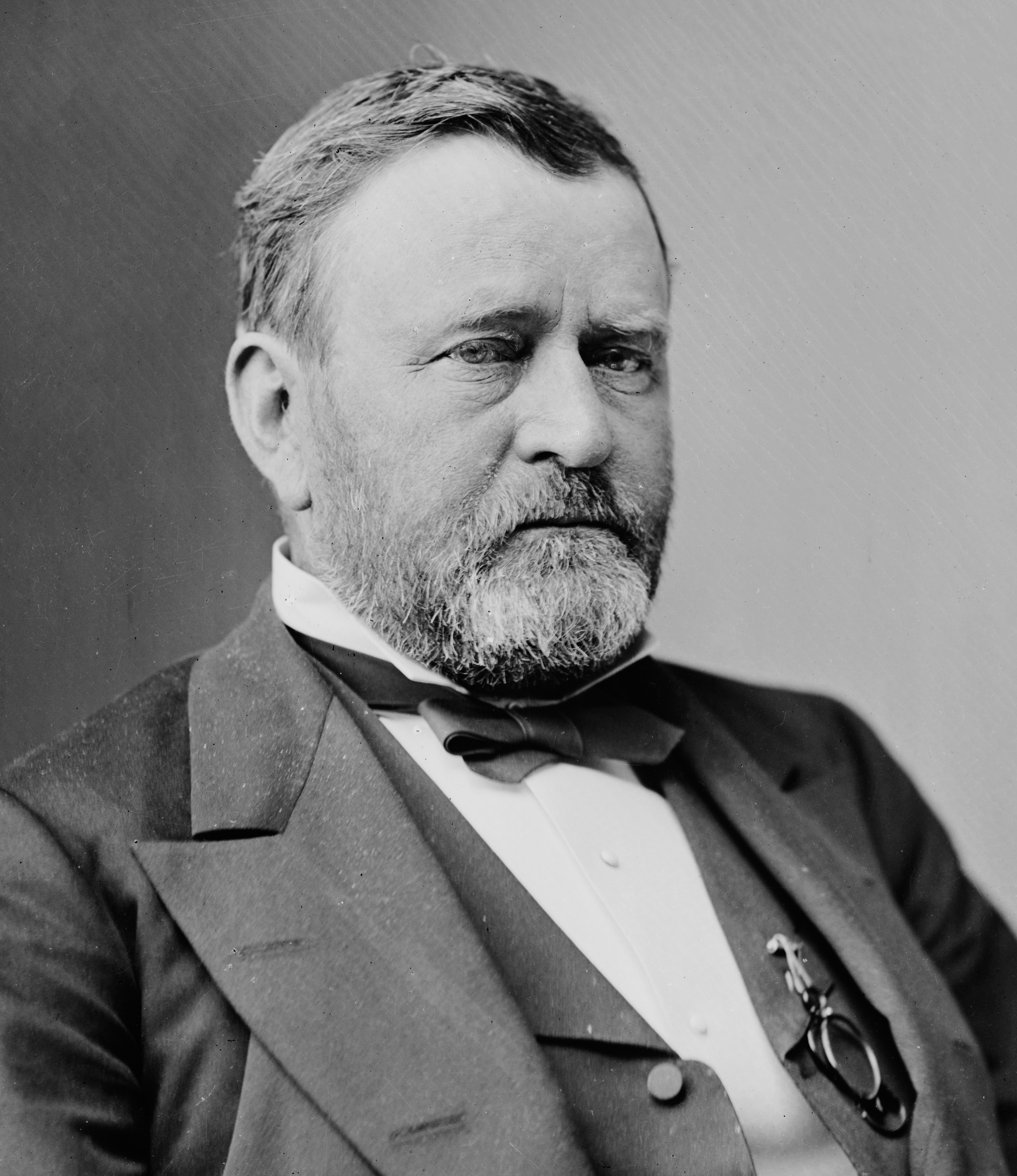

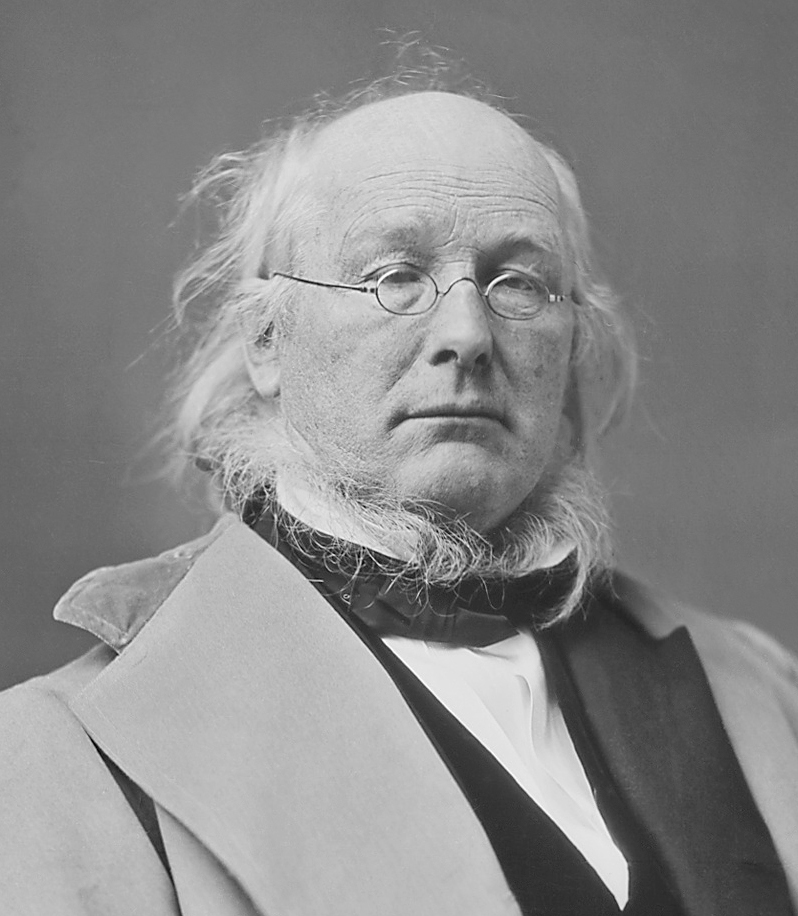
Nominee	Ulysses S. Grant	Horace Greeley
Party	Republican	Liberal Republican
Home state	Illinois	New York
Running mate	Henry Wilson	Benjamin G. Brown
Electoral vote	10	0
Popular vote	94,772	70,130
Percentage	57.38%	42.46%
County results
Grant
50–60%
60–70%
70–80%
80–90%
Greeley
50–60%
60–70%
70–80%
80–90%
President before election
Ulysses S. Grant
Republican
Elected President
Ulysses S. Grant
Republican

The 1872 United States presidential election in North Carolina took place on November 5, 1872. All contemporary 37 states were part of the 1872 United States presidential election. The state voters chose 10 electors to the Electoral College, which selected the president and vice president.

North Carolina was won by the Republican nominees, incumbent President Ulysses S. Grant of Illinois and his running mate Senator Henry Wilson of Massachusetts. Grant and Wilson defeated the Liberal Republican and Democratic nominees, former Congressman Horace Greeley of New York and his running mate former Senator and Governor Benjamin Gratz Brown of Missouri.

Grant won the state by a margin of 14.92%. The state would not vote Republican again until Herbert Hoover won the state in 1928.

== Results ==
1872 United States presidential election in North Carolina
Party	Candidate	Running mate	Popular vote		Electoral vote	
Party	Candidate	Running mate	Count	%	Count	%
Republican	Ulysses S. Grant of Illinois	Henry Wilson of Massachusetts	94,772	57.38%	10	100.00%
Liberal Republican	Horace Greeley of New York	B. Gratz Brown of Missouri	70,130	42.46%	0	0.00%
Bourbon Democrat	Charles O'Conor	John Quincy Adams II	261	0.16%	0	0.00%
Total			165,163	100.00%	10	100.00%

== See also ==
- United States presidential elections in North Carolina
