= 1840 United States presidential election in North Carolina =

- November 12, 1840
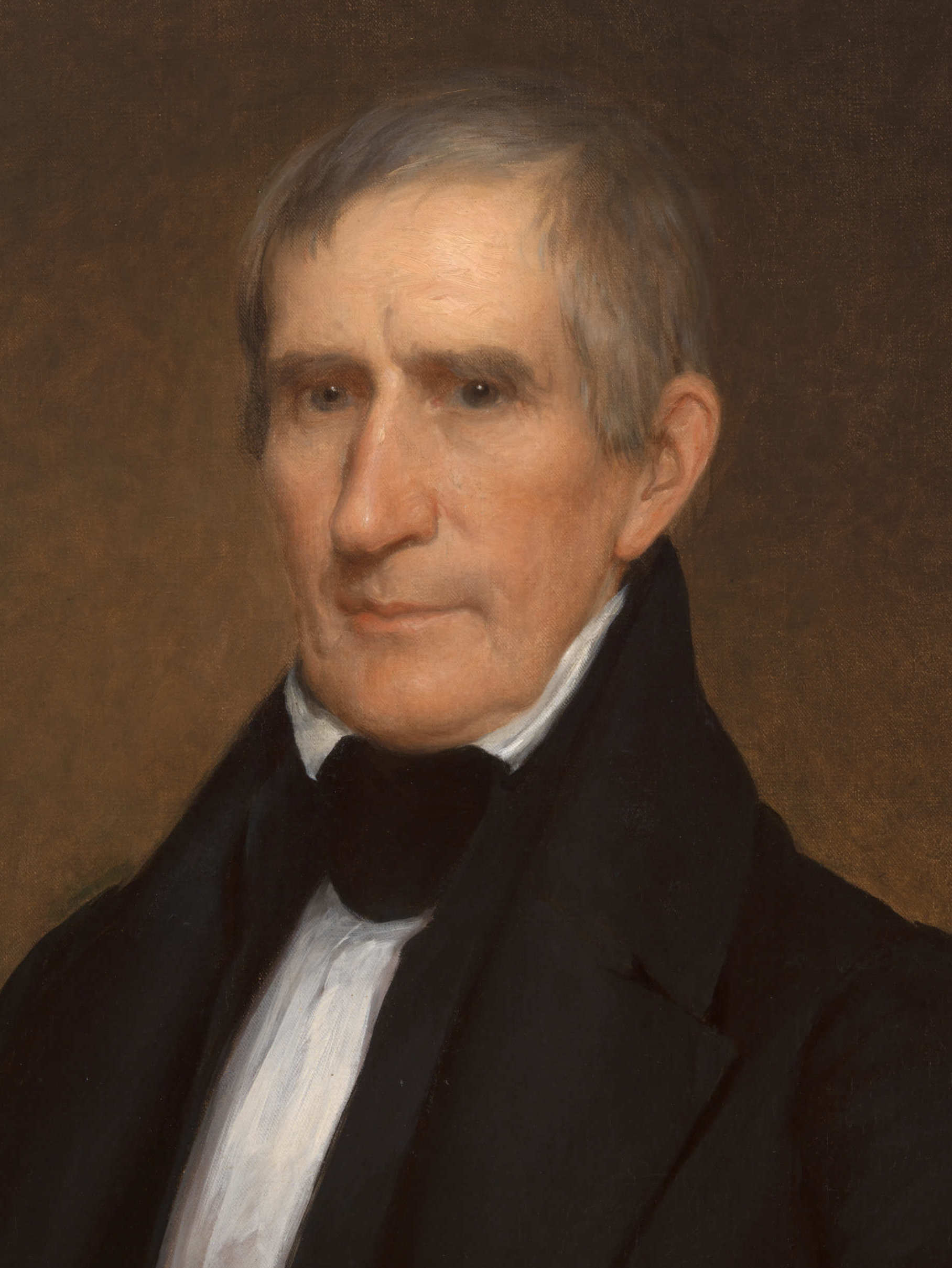

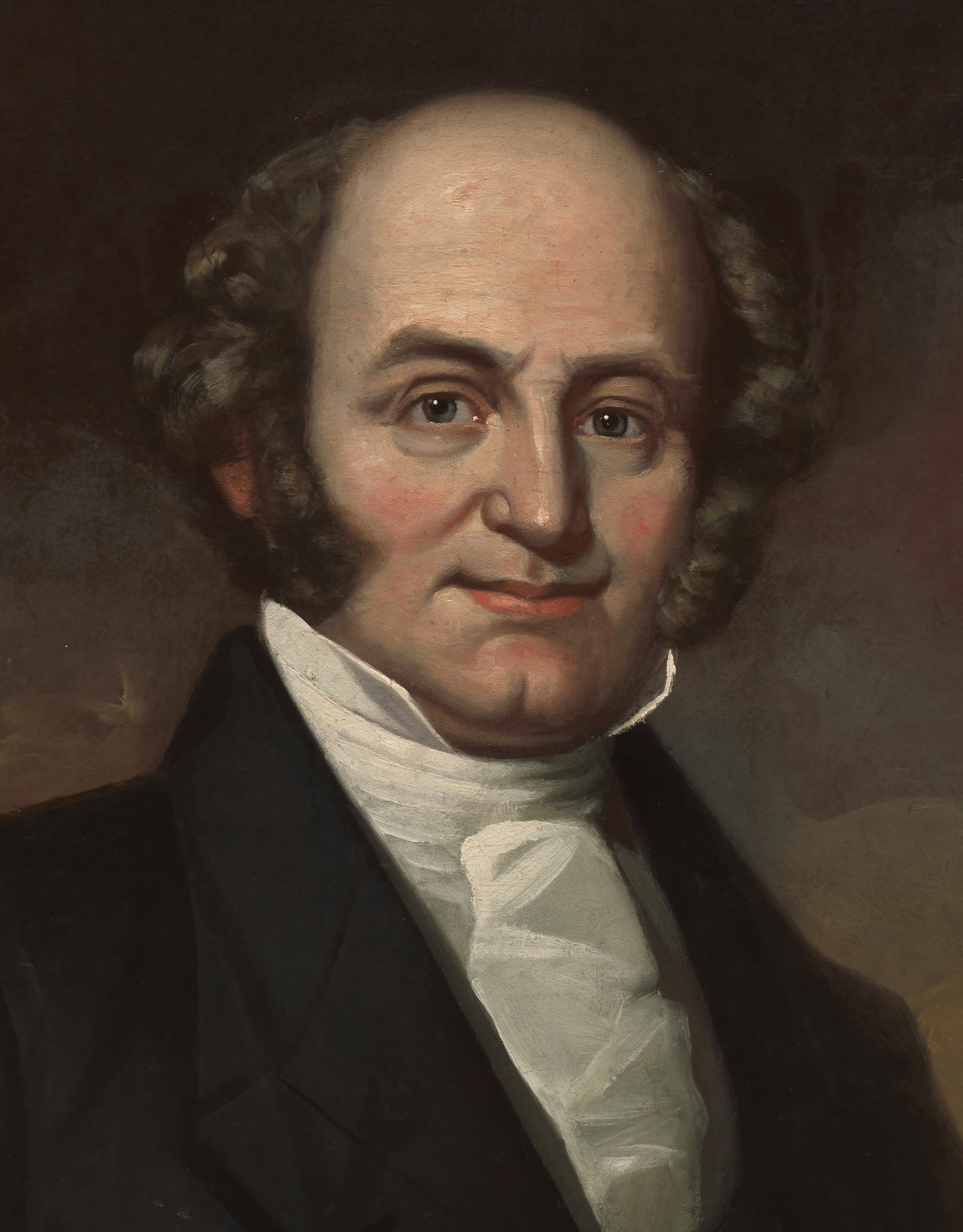
Nominee	William Henry Harrison	Martin Van Buren
Party	Whig	Democratic
Home state	Ohio	New York
Running mate	John Tyler	none
Electoral vote	15	0
Popular vote	46,567	34,168
Percentage	57.68%	42.32%
County results
Harrison
50–60%
60–70%
70–80%
80–90%
90–100%
Van Buren
50–60%
60–70%
70–80%
80–90%
90–100%
No Data/Vote
President before election
Martin Van Buren
Democratic
Elected President
William Henry Harrison
Whig

A presidential election was held in North Carolina on November 12, 1840 as part of the 1840 United States presidential election. Voters chose 15 representatives, or electors to the Electoral College, who voted for President and Vice President.

North Carolina voted for the Whig candidate, William Henry Harrison, over Democratic candidate Martin Van Buren. Harrison won North Carolina by a margin of 15.36%.

With 57.68% of the popular vote, North Carolina would prove to be Harrison's fifth strongest state after Kentucky, Vermont, Rhode Island and Louisiana.

== Results ==
1840 United States presidential election in North Carolina
Party	Candidate	Running mate	Popular vote		Electoral vote	
Party	Candidate	Running mate	Count	%	Count	%
Whig	William Henry Harrison of Ohio	John Tyler of Virginia	46,567	57.68%	15	100.00%
Democratic	Martin Van Buren of New York	Richard Mentor Johnson of Kentucky	34,168	42.32%	0	0.00%
Total			80,735	100.00%	15	100.00%

== See also ==
- United States presidential elections in North Carolina
