= United States presidential elections in North Carolina =

Presidential elections in North Carolina
- Number of elections: 59
- Voted Democratic: 30
- Voted Republican: 18
- Voted Whig: 3
- Voted Democratic-Republican: 7
- Voted other: 1 (Note: George Washington, 1792.)
- Voted for winning candidate: 40
- Voted for losing candidate: 19

Following is a table of United States presidential elections in North Carolina, ordered by year. Since its admission to statehood in 1789, North Carolina has participated in every U.S. presidential election except the election of 1864, during the American Civil War, when the state had seceded to join the Confederacy. North Carolina did not participate in the 1788–89 United States presidential election, as it did not ratify the Constitution of the United States until months after the end of that election and after George Washington had assumed office as President of the United States.

Winners of the state are in bold. The shading refers to the state winner, and not the national winner.

== Elections from 1864 to present ==
View source data.

Year	Winner (nationally)	Votes	Percent	Runner-up (nationally)	Votes	Percent	Other national candidates (Note: For purposes of these lists, other national candidates are defined as those who won at least one electoral vote, or won at least ten percent of the vote in multiple states.)	Votes	Percent	Electoral votes	Notes
2024	**Donald Trump**	2,898,428	50.86	Kamala Harris	2,715,380	47.65	—			16	
2020	Joe Biden	2,684,292	48.59	**Donald Trump**	2,758,775	49.93	—			15	
2016	**Donald Trump** (Note: Won the electoral college while losing the popular vote)	2,362,631	49.83	Hillary Clinton	2,189,316	46.17	—			15	
2012	Barack Obama	2,178,391	48.35	**Mitt Romney**	2,270,395	50.39	—			15	
2008	**Barack Obama**	2,142,651	49.70	John McCain	2,128,474	49.38	—			15	
2004	**George W. Bush**	1,961,166	56.02	John Kerry	1,525,849	43.58	—			15	
2000	**George W. Bush**	1,631,163	56.03	Al Gore	1,257,692	43.2	—			14	
1996	Bill Clinton	1,107,849	44.04	**Bob Dole**	1,225,938	48.73	Ross Perot	168,059	6.68	14	
1992	Bill Clinton	1,114,042	42.65	**George H. W. Bush**	1,134,661	43.44	Ross Perot	357,864	13.7	14	
1988	**George H. W. Bush**	1,237,258	57.97	Michael Dukakis	890,167	41.71	—			13	
1984	**Ronald Reagan**	1,346,481	61.90	Walter Mondale	824,287	37.89	—			13	
1980	**Ronald Reagan**	915,018	49.30	Jimmy Carter	875,635	47.18	John B. Anderson	52,800	2.85	13	
1976	**Jimmy Carter**	927,365	55.27	Gerald Ford	741,960	44.22	—			13	
1972	**Richard Nixon**	1,054,889	69.46	George McGovern	438,705	28.89	—			13	
1968	**Richard Nixon**	627,192	39.51	Hubert Humphrey	464,113	29.24	George Wallace	496,188	31.26	13	1 electoral vote to Wallace (faithless elector)
1964	**Lyndon B. Johnson**	800,139	56.15	Barry Goldwater	624,844	43.85	—			13	
1960	**John F. Kennedy**	713,136	52.11	Richard Nixon	655,420	47.89	—			14	
1956	Dwight D. Eisenhower	575,062	49.34	**Adlai Stevenson II**	590,530	50.66	T. Coleman Andrews/ Unpledged Electors (Note: Was allied with a slate of unpledged electors in Louisiana, Mississippi and South Carolina)	—	—	14	
1952	Dwight D. Eisenhower	558,107	46.09	**Adlai Stevenson II**	652,803	53.91	—			14	
1948	**Harry S. Truman**	459,070	58.02	Thomas E. Dewey	258,572	32.68	Strom Thurmond	69,652	8.8	14	
1944	**Franklin D. Roosevelt**	527,399	66.71	Thomas E. Dewey	263,155	33.29	—			14	
1940	**Franklin D. Roosevelt**	609,015	74.03	Wendell Willkie	213,633	25.97	—			13	
1936	**Franklin D. Roosevelt**	616,141	73.40	Alf Landon	223,283	26.6	—			13	
1932	**Franklin D. Roosevelt**	497,566	69.93	Herbert Hoover	208,344	29.28	—			13	
1928	**Herbert Hoover**	348,923	54.94	Al Smith	286,227	45.06	—			12	
1924	Calvin Coolidge	191,753	39.73	**John W. Davis**	284,270	58.89	Robert M. La Follette	6,651	1.38	12	
1920	Warren G. Harding	232,848	43.22	**James M. Cox**	305,447	56.70	Parley P. Christensen	—	—	12	
1916	**Woodrow Wilson**	168,383	58.10	Charles E. Hughes	120,890	41.71	—			12	
1912	**Woodrow Wilson**	144,407	59.24	Theodore Roosevelt	69,135	28.36	William H. Taft	29,129	11.95	12	
1908	William H. Taft	114,887	45.49	**William Jennings Bryan**	136,928	54.22	—			12	
1904	Theodore Roosevelt	82,442	39.67	**Alton B. Parker**	124,091	59.71	—			12	
1900	William McKinley	132,997	45.47	**William Jennings Bryan**	157,733	53.92	—			11	
1896	William McKinley	155,122	46.82	**William Jennings Bryan**	174,408	52.64	—			11	
1892	**Grover Cleveland**	132,951	47.44	Benjamin Harrison	100,346	35.8	James B. Weaver	44,336	15.82	11	
1888	Benjamin Harrison	134,784	47.20	**Grover Cleveland**	147,902	51.79	—			11	
1884	**Grover Cleveland**	142,905	53.25	James G. Blaine	125,021	46.59	—			11	
1880	James A. Garfield	115,616	47.98	**Winfield S. Hancock**	124,204	51.55	James B. Weaver	1,126	0.47	10	
1876	Rutherford B. Hayes	108,484	46.38	**Samuel J. Tilden**	125,427	53.62	—			10	
1872	**Ulysses S. Grant**	94,772	57.38	Horace Greeley	70,130	42.46	—			10	
1868	**Ulysses S. Grant**	96,939	53.4	Horatio Seymour	84,559	46.6	—			9	
1864	Abraham Lincoln	No vote due to secession.		George B. McClellan			—			9	

== Election of 1860 ==
The election of 1860 was a complex realigning election in which the breakdown of the previous two-party alignment culminated in four parties each competing for influence in different parts of the country. The result of the election, with the victory of an ardent opponent of slavery, spurred the secession of eleven states and brought about the American Civil War.

Year	Winner (nationally)	Votes	Percent	Runner-up (nationally)	Votes	Percent	Runner-up (nationally)	Votes	Percent	Runner-up (nationally)	Votes	Percent	Electoral votes
1860	Abraham Lincoln	no ballots		Stephen A. Douglas	2,737	2.8	**John C. Breckinridge**	48,846	50.5	John Bell	45,129	46.7	10

== Elections from 1828 to 1856 ==
Year	Winner (nationally)	Votes	Percent	Runner-up (nationally)	Votes	Percent	Other national candidates	Votes	Percent	Electoral votes	Notes
1856	**James Buchanan**	48,243	56.78	John C. Frémont	no ballots		Millard Fillmore	36,720	43.22	10	
1852	**Franklin Pierce**	39,778	50.43	Winfield Scott	39,043	49.49	John P. Hale	no ballots		10	
1848	**Zachary Taylor**	44,054	55.17	Lewis Cass	35,772	44.80	Martin Van Buren	no ballots		11	
1844	James K. Polk	39,287	47.61	**Henry Clay**	43,232	52.39	—			11	
1840	**William Henry Harrison**	46,567	57.68	Martin Van Buren	34,168	42.32	—			15	
1836	**Martin Van Buren**	26,631	53.1	Hugh Lawson White	23,521	46.9	various (Note: Three other candidates ran and received electoral votes nationally as part of the unsuccessful Whig strategy to defeat Martin Van Buren by running four candidates with local appeal in different regions of the country. The others were William Henry Harrison, Daniel Webster, and Willie Person Mangum. None of these candidates appeared on the ballot in North Carolina.)	no ballots		15	
1832	**Andrew Jackson**	25,261	84.77	Henry Clay	4,538	15.23	William Wirt	no ballots		15	
1828	**Andrew Jackson**	37,814	73.07	John Quincy Adams	13,918	26.90	—			15	

== Election of 1824 ==
The election of 1824 was a complex realigning election following the collapse of the prevailing Democratic-Republican Party, resulting in four different candidates each claiming to carry the banner of the party, and competing for influence in different parts of the country. The election was the only one in history to be decided by the House of Representatives under the provisions of the Twelfth Amendment to the United States Constitution after no candidate secured a majority of the electoral vote. It was also the only presidential election in which the candidate who received a plurality of electoral votes (Andrew Jackson) did not become president, a source of great bitterness for Jackson and his supporters, who proclaimed the election of Adams a corrupt bargain.

Year	Winner (nationally)	Votes	Percent	Runner-up (nationally)	Votes	Percent	Runner-up (nationally)	Votes	Percent	Runner-up (nationally)	Votes	Percent	Electoral votes
1824	**Andrew Jackson**	20,231	56.03	John Quincy Adams	no ballots		Henry Clay	no ballots		William H. Crawford	15,622	43.26	15

== Elections from 1792 to 1820 ==
In the election of 1820, incumbent President James Monroe ran effectively unopposed, winning all 15 of North Carolina's electoral votes, and all electoral votes nationwide except one vote in New Hampshire. To the extent that a popular vote was held, it was primarily directed to filling the office of vice president.

Year	Winner (nationally)	Runner-up (nationally)	Electoral votes	Notes
1820	**James Monroe**	—	15	Monroe effectively ran unopposed.
1816	**James Monroe**	Rufus King	15	
1812	**James Madison**	DeWitt Clinton	15	
1808	**James Madison**	Charles C. Pinckney	14	Electoral vote split, eleven for Madison, three for Pinckney.
1804	**Thomas Jefferson**	Charles C. Pinckney	14	
1800	**Thomas Jefferson**	John Adams	12	Electoral vote split, eight for Jefferson, four for Adams.
1796	John Adams	**Thomas Jefferson**	12	Electoral vote split, eleven for Jefferson, one for Adams.
1792	**George Washington**	—	12	Washington effectively ran unopposed.

== Election of 1788 to 1789 ==
North Carolina did not participate in the 1788–89 United States presidential election, as it did not ratify the Constitution of the United States until months after the end of that election and after George Washington had assumed office as President of the United States.

== See also ==
- Elections in North Carolina
