= 1816 United States presidential election in North Carolina =

- November 14, 1816
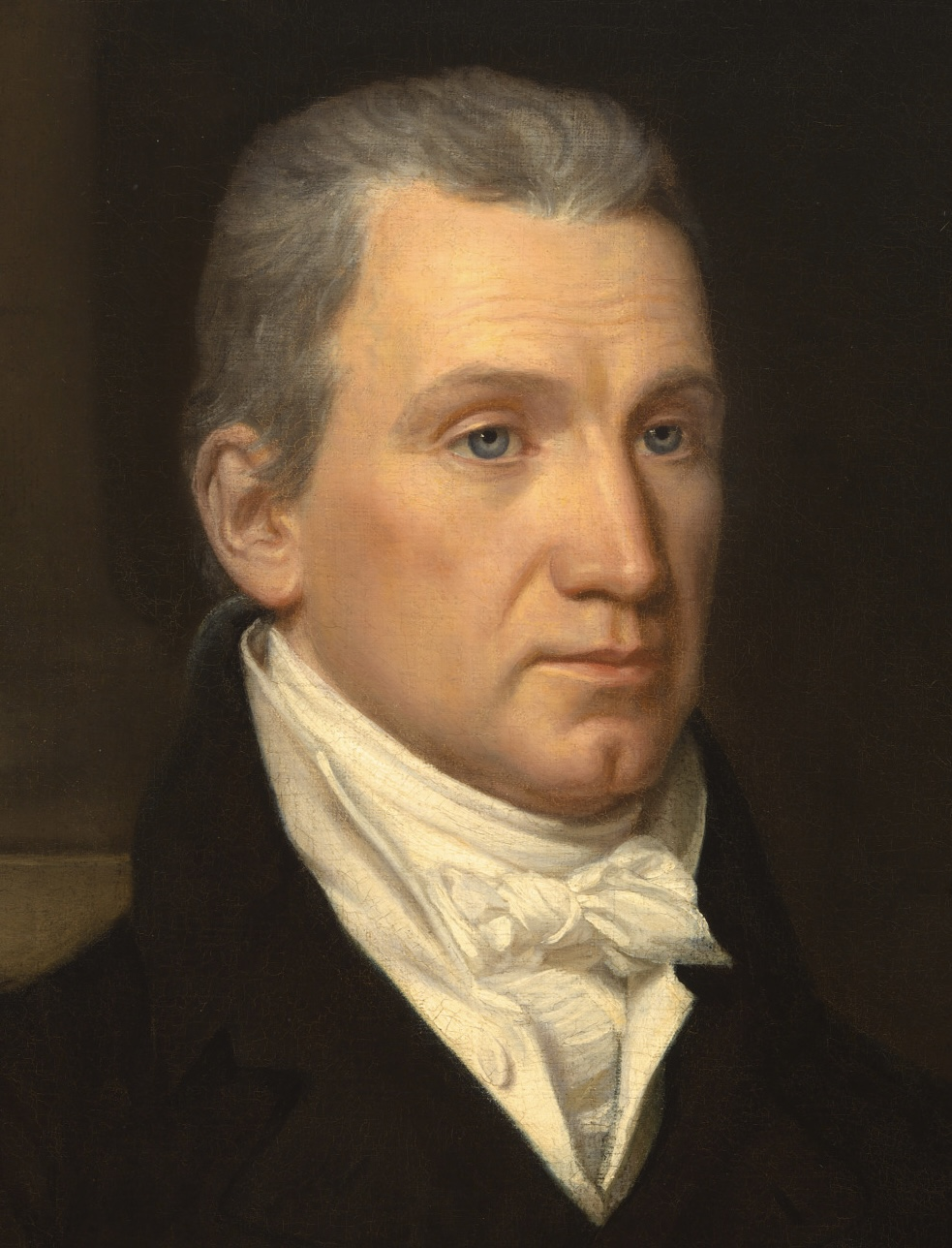

Nominee	James Monroe	Unpledged electors
Party	Democratic-Republican	Federalist
Home state	Virginia	N/A
Running mate	Daniel D. Tompkins	N/A (Note: No candidate formally nominated)
Electoral vote	15	0
Popular vote	9,549	158
Percentage	98.4%	1.6%
County results
Monroe
50–60%
60–70%
80–90%
90–100%
Federalist electors
60–70%
70–80%
President before election
James Madison
Democratic-Republican
Elected President
James Monroe
Democratic-Republican

A presidential election was held in North Carolina on November 14, 1816 as part of the 1816 United States presidential election. The Democratic-Republican ticket of U.S. secretary of state James Monroe and governor of New York Daniel D. Tompkins defeated the Federalist ticket. The Federalist Party failed to nominate a candidate. In the national election, Monroe easily defeated senior U.S. senator from New York Rufus King, who received 34 votes from unpledged electors despite not being a candidate.

== General election ==
=== Summary ===
North Carolina chose 15 electors on a statewide general ticket. Nineteenth-century election laws required voters to vote directly for members of the Electoral College rather than for president. This sometimes resulted in small differences in the number of votes cast for electors pledged to the same presidential candidate, if some voters did not vote for all the electors nominated by a party. This table compares the votes for the most popular elector pledged to each ticket, to give an approximate sense of the statewide result.

1816 United States presidential election in North Carolina
Party	Candidate	Votes	%
Democratic-Republican	James Monroe Daniel D. Tompkins	9,549	98.37
Federalist	Unpledged electors	158	1.63
Total votes		9,707	100.00

=== Results ===
1816 United States presidential election in North Carolina
Party	Candidate	Votes
Democratic-Republican	Francis Locke Jr.	9,549
Democratic-Republican	Peter Forney	9,424
Democratic-Republican	Joseph Pickett	9,421
Democratic-Republican	Jesse Franklin	9,390
Democratic-Republican	Joseph Riddick	9,371
Democratic-Republican	Alexander Gray	9,367
Democratic-Republican	John Hall	9,334
Democratic-Republican	Vine Allen	9,333
Democratic-Republican	Thomas Ruffin	9,328
Democratic-Republican	Nathaniel Jones	9,307
Democratic-Republican	James Hoskins	9,275
Democratic-Republican	Thomas D. King	9,261
Democratic-Republican	Abraham Phillips	9,246
Democratic-Republican	Thomas Wynns	9,220
Democratic-Republican	Robert Love	9,114
Democratic-Republican	Andrew Baird	640
Federalist	John Winslow	158
Federalist	Frederick Nash	107
Federalist	John Hinton	104
Federalist	Jesse Pearson	103
Federalist	James Iredell	99
Federalist	Thomas Burgess	96
Federalist	Robert Williams	93
Federalist	Durant Hatch	92
Federalist	James M. MacNairy	92
Federalist	William Porter	92
Federalist	Jeremiah Slade	91
Federalist	William Lenoir	91
Federalist	Robert Smith	91
Federalist	John D. Toomer	91
Federalist	Alexander Sneed	87
Federalist	William Gaston	61
None	Nathaniel Scales	38
None	Frily Jones	31
Federalist	John Stanley	19
Federalist	William Blackman	17
Federalist	William Dismuskes	15
Federalist	John Phifer	12
Federalist	William Breathell	11
Federalist	Joshua Craven	11
Federalist	W. H. Edwards	11
Federalist	Humphrey Hudgens	11
Federalist	J. Jones	11
Federalist	William Jones	12
Federalist	D. Sawyer	11
Federalist	Edward Sweat	11
None	David Clark	8
None	Hardee Smith	8
Federalist	William Boylan	7
None	Alfred Rowland	7
Federalist	Duncan Cameron	6
None	Thomas Davis	5
Federalist	Leonard Henderson	5
None	Alexander Phillips	5
None	Valentine Allen	4
None	J. Gilchrist	4
Federalist	Archibald Henderson	4
None	Thomas Kinny	4
Federalist	William Little	3
Federalist	Simmons J. Baker	3
Federalist	Felton	3
Federalist	Thomas B. Haughton	3
None	Joseph Hoskins	3
None	Thomas Hoskins	3
Federalist	Atlas Jones	3
Federalist	William W. Jones	3
None	Robert Lindsay	3
Federalist	William MacLain	3
None	William R. Pickett	3
Federalist	Simmons	3
Federalist	Montfort Stokes	3
None	Thomas Brown	2
Federalist	Lawson Henderson	2
None	James King	2
None	Benjamin Lee	2
None	Robert Airs	1
None	John Allen	1
None	William Blackburn	1
None	Thomas Blackwell	1
None	John Bowdon	1
Federalist	Peter Brown	1
Federalist	Josiah Collins	1
None	Caleb Crickmore	1
None	Johnston Dempsey	1
None	William Dirmon	1
Federalist	Abraham Dodd	1
None	J. Falkner	1
None	Joseph Gales	1
None	Samuel Goodwin	1
None	Abraham Gray	1
None	Jepe Hale	1
None	William Hamilton	1
None	Harris	1
None	Charles Haskins	1
None	John Haywood	1
None	Green Hill	1
Federalist	James Irvin	1
None	William Irvin	1
Federalist	Calvin Jones	1
Federalist	Edward Jones	1
Federalist	Hugh Jones	1
None	Kenan	1
Federalist	Samuel King	1
None	Zephaniah Leonard	1
None	John Long	1
None	MacAllister	1
None	George MacCullock	1
Federalist	Edward MacNair	1
None	MacQueen	1
None	Daniel Mason	1
None	James Mebane	1
Federalist	Alexander Moore	1
Federalist	Joseph Pearson	1
None	Richmond Pearson	1
None	Alinder Phillips	1
Federalist	William Polk	1
None	John Rampour	1
None	Rayford	1
None	Robert Riddick	1
None	Nathaniel Ruffin	1
None	Seawell	1
None	Rueben Smith	1
None	William Smithwick	1
Federalist	George E. Spiriell	1
None	Robert Vanhook	1
None	Felix Walker	1
None	Lewis Williams	1
None	William Williams	1
Total		≥9,707

=== Results by county ===
This table compares the result for the most popular Democratic-Republican and Federalist electors in each county with surviving returns. The totals presented thus differ slightly from the statewide results summary, which compares the results for the most popular elector pledged to each ticket statewide.

County	James Monroe Democratic-Republican		Unpledged electors Federalist		Margin		Total
County	Votes	Percent	Votes	Percent	Votes	Percent	Total
Anson	164	100.00	—		164	100.00	164
Ashe	161	100.00	—		161	100.00	161
Beaufort	168	100.00	—		168	100.00	168
Bertie	439	100.00	—		439	100.00	439
Bladen	**		**		**		**
Brunswick	7	100.00	—		7	100.00	7
Buncombe	167	100.00	—		167	100.00	167
Burke	297	100.00	—		297	100.00	297
Cabarrus	**		**		**		**
Camden	245	100.00	—		245	100.00	245
Carteret	**		**		**		**
Caswell	270	100.00	—		270	100.00	270
Chatham	154	100.00	—		154	100.00	154
Chowan	57	100.00	—		57	100.00	574
Columbus	**		**		**		**
Craven	179	100.00	—		179	100.00	179
Cumberland	155	100.00	—		155	100.00	155
Currituck	87	100.00	—		87	100.00	87
Duplin	363	100.00	—		363	100.00	363
Edgecombe	223	99.55	1	0.45	222	99.10	224
Franklin	315	100.00	—		315	100.00	315
Gates	86	100.00	—		86	100.00	86
Granville	267	99.26	2	0.74	265	98.52	269
Greene	21	100.00	—		21	100.00	21
Guilford	111	100.00	—		111	100.00	111
Halifax	**		**		**		**
Haywood	106	100.00	—		106	100.00	106
Hertford	233	100.00	—		233	100.00	233
Hyde	125	100.00	—		125	100.00	125
Iredell	51	100.00	—		51	100.00	51
Johnston	1	100.00	—		1	100.00	1
Jones	16	100.00	—		16	100.00	16
Lenoir	66	100.00	—		66	100.00	66
Lincoln	319	99.69	1	0.31	318	99.38	320
Martin	59	95.16	3	4.84	56	90.32	62
Mecklenburg	295	100.00	—		295	100.00	295
Montgomery	71	100.00	—		71	100.00	71
Moore	**		**		**		**
Nash	143	100.00	—		143	100.00	143
New Hanover	203	100.00	—		203	100.00	203
Northampton	195	100.00	—		195	100.00	195
Onslow	40	100.00	—		40	100.00	40
Orange	465	100.00	—		465	100.00	465
Pasquotank	71	100.00	—		71	100.00	71
Perquimans	15	100.00	—		15	100.00	15
Person	276	99.64	1	0.36	274	99.28	277
Pitt	15	100.00	—		15	100.00	15
Randolph	256	100.00	—		256	100.00	256
Richmond	73	100.00	—		73	100.00	73
Robeson	31	32.29	65	67.71	-34	-35.42	96
Rockingham	217	100.00	—		217	100.00	217
Rowan	164	100.00	—		164	100.00	164
Rutherford	112	91.06	11	8.94	101	82.12	123
Sampson	72	100.00	—		72	100.00	72
Stokes	181	100.00	—		181	100.00	181
Surry	500	100.00	—		500	100.00	500
Tyrell	131	100.00	—		131	100.00	131
Wake	261	100.00	—		261	100.00	261
Warren	349	100.00	—		349	100.00	349
Washington	164	100.00	—		164	100.00	164
Wayne	54	34.18	104	65.82	-50	-31.64	158
Wilkes	135	97.83	3	2.17	132	95.66	138
TOTAL	9,401	98.01	191	1.99	9,210	96.02	9,592

=== Electoral college ===
1816 United States Electoral College vote in North Carolina
For president				For vice president			
Candidate	Party	Home state	Electoral vote	Candidate	Party	Home state	Electoral vote
James Monroe	Democratic-Republican	Virginia	15	Daniel D. Tompkins	Democratic-Republican	New York	15
Total			15	Total			15

== See also ==
- United States presidential elections in North Carolina
