= 1860 United States presidential election in North Carolina =

- November 6, 1860
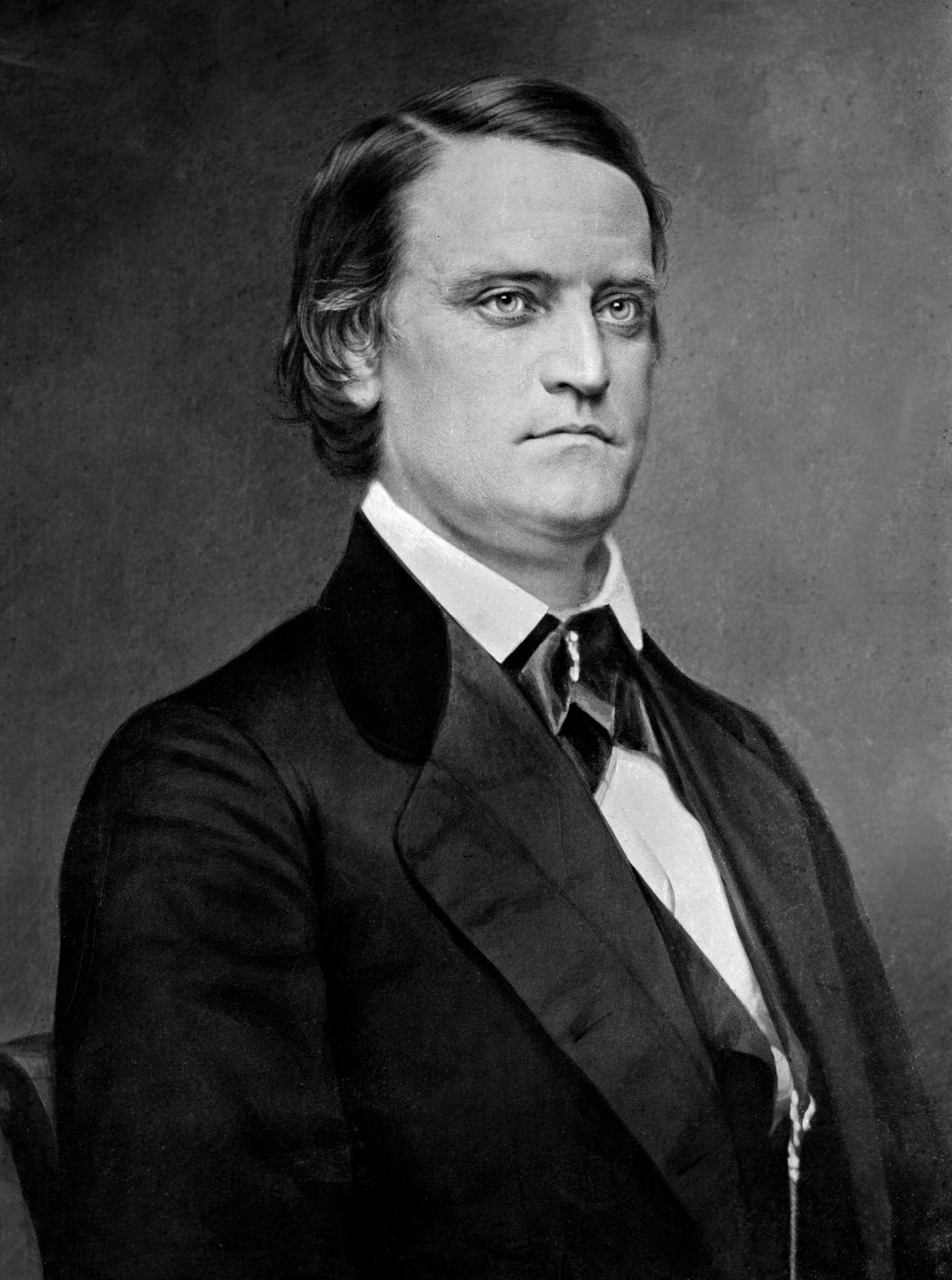

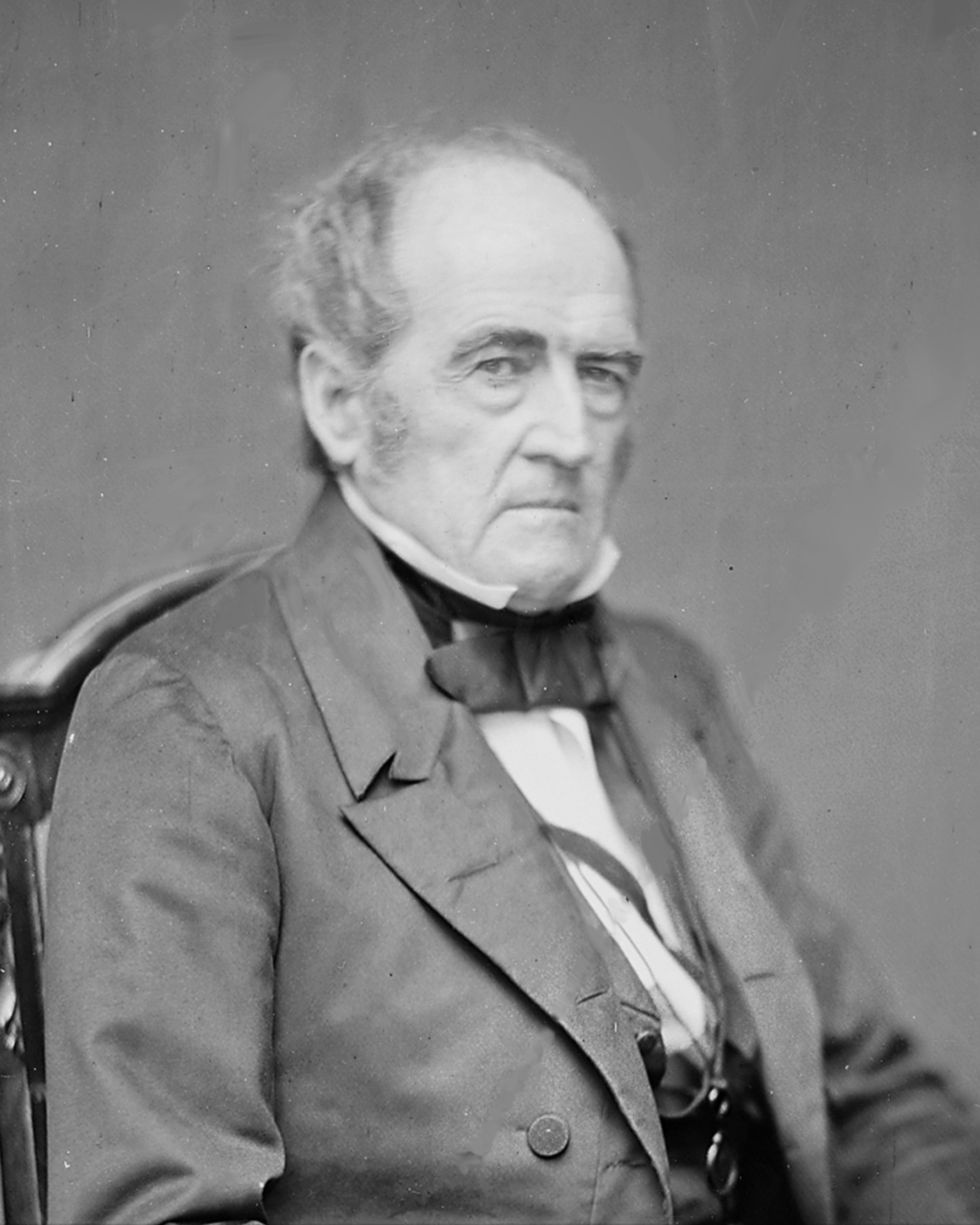
Nominee	John C. Breckinridge	John Bell
Party	Southern Democratic	Constitutional Union
Home state	Kentucky	Tennessee
Running mate	Joseph Lane	Edward Everett
Electoral vote	10	0
Popular vote	48,846	45,129
Percentage	50.51%	46.66%
County results
Breckinridge
40–50%
50–60%
60–70%
70–80%
80–90%
90–100%
Bell
40–50%
50–60%
60–70%
70–80%
80–90%
90–100%
President before election
James Buchanan
Democratic
Elected President
Abraham Lincoln
Republican

The 1860 United States presidential election in North Carolina took place on November 6, 1860, as part of the 1860 United States presidential election. Voters chose 10 representatives, or electors, to the Electoral College, who voted for president and vice president.

North Carolina was won by the Southern Democratic candidate 14th Vice President of the United States John C. Breckinridge of Kentucky and his running mate Senator Joseph Lane of Oregon. They defeated the Constitutional Union candidate Senator John Bell of Tennessee and his running mate 15th Governor of Massachusetts Edward Everett as well as the Democratic candidate Senator Stephen A. Douglas of Illinois and his running mate 41st Governor of Georgia Herschel V. Johnson. Breckinridge won the state by a narrow margin of 3.85%.

The Republican Party and its candidate Abraham Lincoln did not have significant ballot distribution in the state.

== Results ==
1860 United States presidential election in North Carolina
Party	Candidate	Votes	%
Southern Democratic	John C. Breckinridge	48,846	50.51%
Constitutional Union	John Bell	45,129	46.66%
Democratic	Stephen A. Douglas	2,737	2.83%
Total votes		96,712	100%

=== Results by county ===
1860 United States presidential election in North Carolina (by county) (Note: Alleghany, Bladen, Madison, and Wilson counties had no returns.)
County	John C. Breckinridge Southern Democratic		John Bell Constitutional Union		Stephen A. Douglas Democratic		Total votes cast
County	#	%	#	%	#	%	Total votes cast
Alamance	536	43.47%	661	53.61%	36	2.92%	1,233
Alexander	403	46.00%	471	53.77%	2	0.23%	876
Anson	245	21.82%	871	77.56%	7	0.62%	1,123
Ashe	229	24.18%	717	75.71%	1	0.11%	947
Beaufort	549	32.82%	1,082	64.67%	42	2.51%	1,673
Bertie	399	39.39%	597	58.93%	17	1.68%	1,013
Brunswick	326	45.72%	386	54.14%	1	0.14%	713
Burke	470	51.03%	447	48.53%	4	0.43%	921
Buncombe	662	46.75%	705	49.79%	49	3.46%	1,416
Cabarrus	445	34.96%	810	63.63%	18	1.41%	1,273
Caldwell	229	33.33%	449	65.36%	9	1.31%	687
Camden	83	13.97%	503	84.68%	8	1.35%	594
Carteret	370	43.38%	441	51.70%	42	4.92%	853
Caswell	994	79.90%	237	19.05%	13	1.05%	1,244
Catawba	878	74.22%	302	25.53%	3	0.25%	1,183
Chatham	604	34.17%	970	54.86%	194	10.97%	1,768
Cherokee	459	39.88%	677	58.82%	15	1.30%	1,151
Chowan	239	50.74%	194	41.19%	38	8.07%	471
Cleveland	1,091	84.77%	196	15.23%	0	0.00%	1,287
Columbus	723	68.79%	322	30.64%	6	0.57%	1,051
Craven	492	37.64%	693	53.02%	122	9.33%	1,307
Cumberland	879	55.49%	670	42.30%	35	2.21%	1,584
Currituck	595	90.02%	66	9.98%	0	0.00%	661
Davidson	728	37.74%	1,186	61.48%	15	0.78%	1,929
Davie	329	32.87%	641	64.04%	31	3.10%	1,001
Duplin	1,380	90.08%	149	9.73%	3	0.20%	1,532
Edgecombe (Note: Wilson County's totals are counted with those of Edgecombe.)	1,789	89.36%	196	9.79%	17	0.85%	2,002
Forsyth	825	44.35%	965	51.88%	70	3.76%	1,860
Franklin	759	69.57%	318	29.15%	14	1.28%	1,091
Gaston	826	81.54%	131	12.93%	56	5.53%	1,013
Gates	338	45.43%	394	52.96%	12	1.61%	744
Granville	870	47.78%	868	47.67%	83	4.56%	1,821
Greene	381	53.89%	326	46.11%	0	0.00%	707
Guilford	304	13.45%	1,838	81.33%	118	5.22%	2,260
Halifax	757	57.13%	546	41.21%	22	1.66%	1,325
Harnett	542	71.50%	138	18.21%	78	10.29%	758
Haywood	367	58.44%	248	39.49%	13	2.07%	628
Henderson	425	45.95%	496	53.62%	4	0.43%	925
Hertford	246	35.96%	418	61.11%	20	2.92%	684
Hyde	395	46.09%	459	53.56%	3	0.35%	857
Iredell	328	16.53%	1,625	81.91%	31	1.56%	1,984
Jackson	403	73.94%	142	26.06%	0	0.00%	545
Johnston	974	59.25%	630	38.32%	40	2.43%	1,644
Jones	197	52.96%	165	44.35%	10	2.69%	372
Lenoir	533	61.19%	317	36.39%	21	2.41%	871
Lincoln	473	65.60%	243	33.70%	5	0.69%	721
Macon	221	31.44%	469	66.71%	13	1.85%	703
Martin	751	67.90%	333	30.11%	22	1.99%	1,106
McDowell	276	44.09%	349	55.75%	1	0.16%	626
Mecklenburg	1,101	53.39%	826	40.06%	135	6.55%	2,062
Montgomery	102	12.29%	725	87.35%	3	0.36%	830
Moore	299	28.05%	588	55.16%	179	16.79%	1,066
Nash	1,323	95.11%	64	4.60%	4	0.29%	1,391
New Hanover	1,617	70.73%	664	29.05%	5	0.22%	2,286
Northampton	654	54.36%	506	42.06%	43	3.57%	1,203
Onslow	781	81.52%	153	15.97%	24	2.51%	958
Orange	787	43.36%	956	52.67%	72	3.97%	1,815
Pasquotank	239	31.00%	477	61.87%	55	7.13%	771
Perquimans	234	40.41%	341	58.89%	4	0.69%	579
Person	420	46.05%	483	52.96%	9	0.99%	912
Pitt	731	50.45%	710	49.00%	8	0.55%	1,449
Polk	270	69.41%	118	30.33%	1	0.26%	389
Randolph	321	20.20%	1,224	77.03%	44	2.77%	1,589
Richmond	269	32.93%	544	66.59%	4	0.49%	817
Robeson	720	47.94%	648	43.14%	134	8.92%	1,502
Rockingham	1,017	61.12%	485	29.15%	162	9.74%	1,664
Rowan	1,026	49.76%	1,023	49.61%	13	0.63%	2,062
Rutherford	695	58.26%	495	41.49%	3	0.25%	1,193
Sampson	979	64.66%	529	34.94%	6	0.40%	1,514
Stanly	53	5.32%	934	93.78%	9	0.90%	996
Stokes	745	63.30%	432	36.70%	0	0.00%	1,177
Surry	811	60.48%	502	37.43%	28	2.09%	1,341
Tyrrell	77	19.30%	300	75.19%	22	5.51%	399
Union	858	69.08%	379	30.52%	5	0.40%	1,242
Wake	1,216	46.38%	1,130	43.10%	276	10.53%	2,622
Warren	899	86.19%	138	13.23%	6	0.58%	1,043
Watauga	147	31.34%	322	68.66%	0	0.00%	469
Washington	159	25.81%	413	67.05%	44	7.14%	616
Wayne	1,359	84.46%	239	14.85%	11	0.68%	1,609
Wilkes	363	21.53%	1,323	78.47%	0	0.00%	1,686
Yadkin	495	36.40%	842	61.91%	23	1.69%	1,360
Yancey	500	64.18%	275	35.30%	4	0.51%	779
Total	48,539	50.44%	44,990	46.75%	2,701	2.81%	96,230

== See also ==
- United States presidential elections in North Carolina
