= 1812 United States presidential election in North Carolina =

- October 30 – December 2, 1812
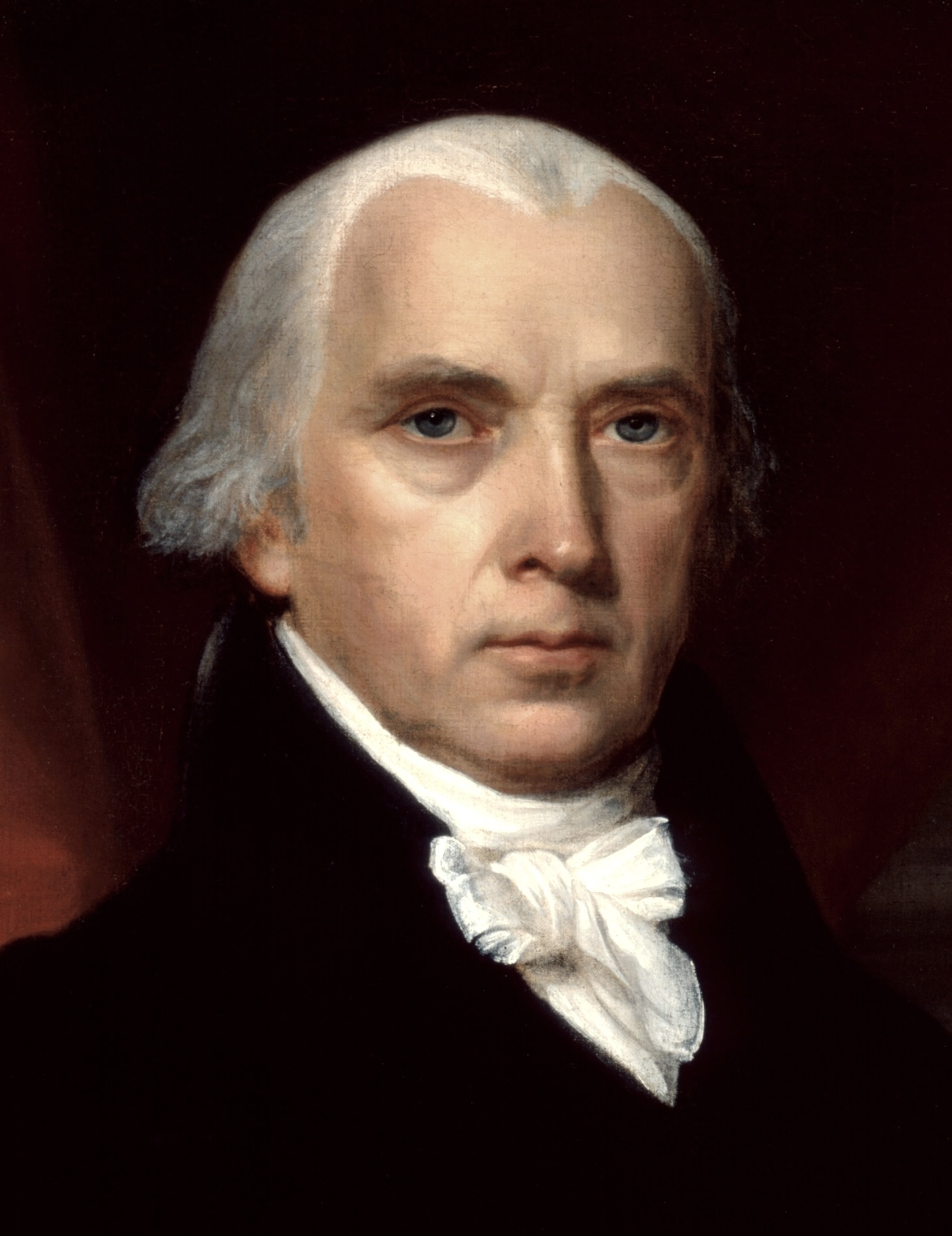
Nominee	James Madison
Party	Democratic-Republican
Home state	Virginia
Running mate	Elbridge Gerry (Note: John Langdon had originally been nominated to serve as Madison's running mate, however Langdon declined the nomination and Gerry was chosen instead.)
Electoral vote	15
Percentage	100.0%
President before election
James Madison
Democratic-Republican
Elected President
James Madison
Democratic-Republican

The 1812 United States presidential election in North Carolina took place between October 30 to December 2, 1812, as part of the 1812 United States presidential election. 15 members of the Electoral College were allocated to the presidential candidates.

North Carolina voted for incumbent Democratic-Republican President James Madison by its electoral votes.

== See also ==
- United States presidential elections in North Carolina
