= 1844 United States presidential election in North Carolina =

- November 14, 1844
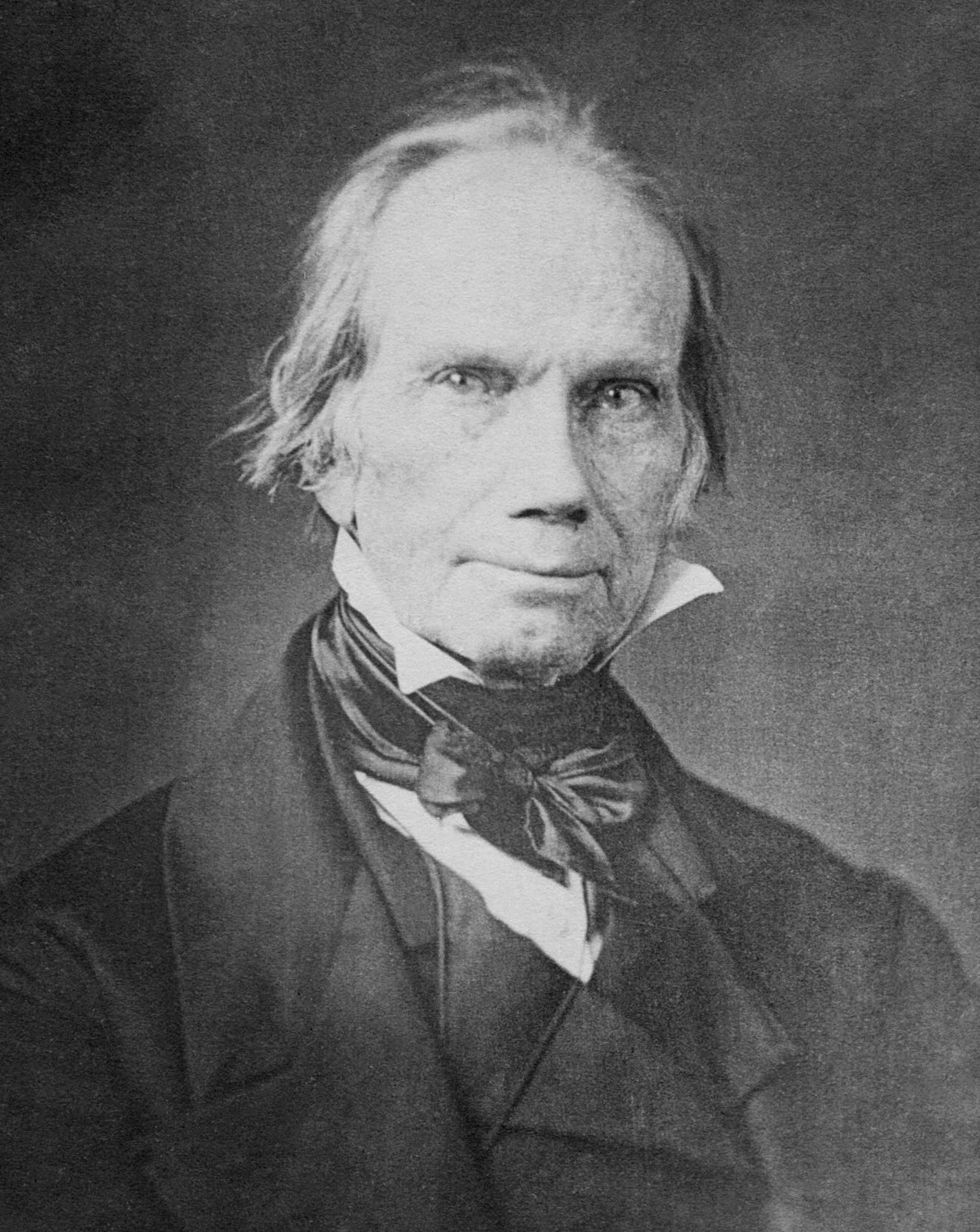

Nominee	Henry Clay	James K. Polk
Party	Whig	Democratic
Home state	Kentucky	Tennessee
Running mate	Theodore Frelinghuysen	George M. Dallas
Electoral vote	11	0
Popular vote	43,232	39,287
Percentage	52.39%	47.60%
County results
Clay
50–60%
60–70%
70–80%
80–90%
90–100%
Polk
50–60%
60–70%
70–80%
80–90%
90–100%
Tie
50%
No Data/Vote
President before election
John Tyler
Independent
Elected President
James K. Polk
Democratic

A presidential election was held in North Carolina on November 14, 1844 as part of the 1844 United States presidential election. Voters chose 11 representatives, or electors to the Electoral College, who voted for President and Vice President.

North Carolina voted for the Whig candidate, Henry Clay, over Democratic candidate James K. Polk. Clay won North Carolina by a margin of 4.63%.

With 52.39% of the popular vote, North Carolina would be Henry Clay's fourth-strongest state after Rhode Island, Vermont and Kentucky. This was also the last presidential election until 1992 when a Democrat would win without carrying the state of North Carolina.

== Results ==
1844 United States presidential election in North Carolina
Party	Candidate	Running mate	Popular vote		Electoral vote	
Party	Candidate	Running mate	Count	%	Count	%
Whig	Henry Clay of Kentucky	Theodore Frelinghuysen of New York	43,232	52.39%	11	100.00%
Democratic	James K. Polk of Tennessee	George M. Dallas of Pennsylvania	39,287	47.60%	0	0.00%
N/A	Others	Others	2	0.01%	0	0.00%
Total			82,521	100.00%	11	100.00%

== See also ==
- United States presidential elections in North Carolina
