= 1844 United States presidential election in Vermont =

- November 12, 1844
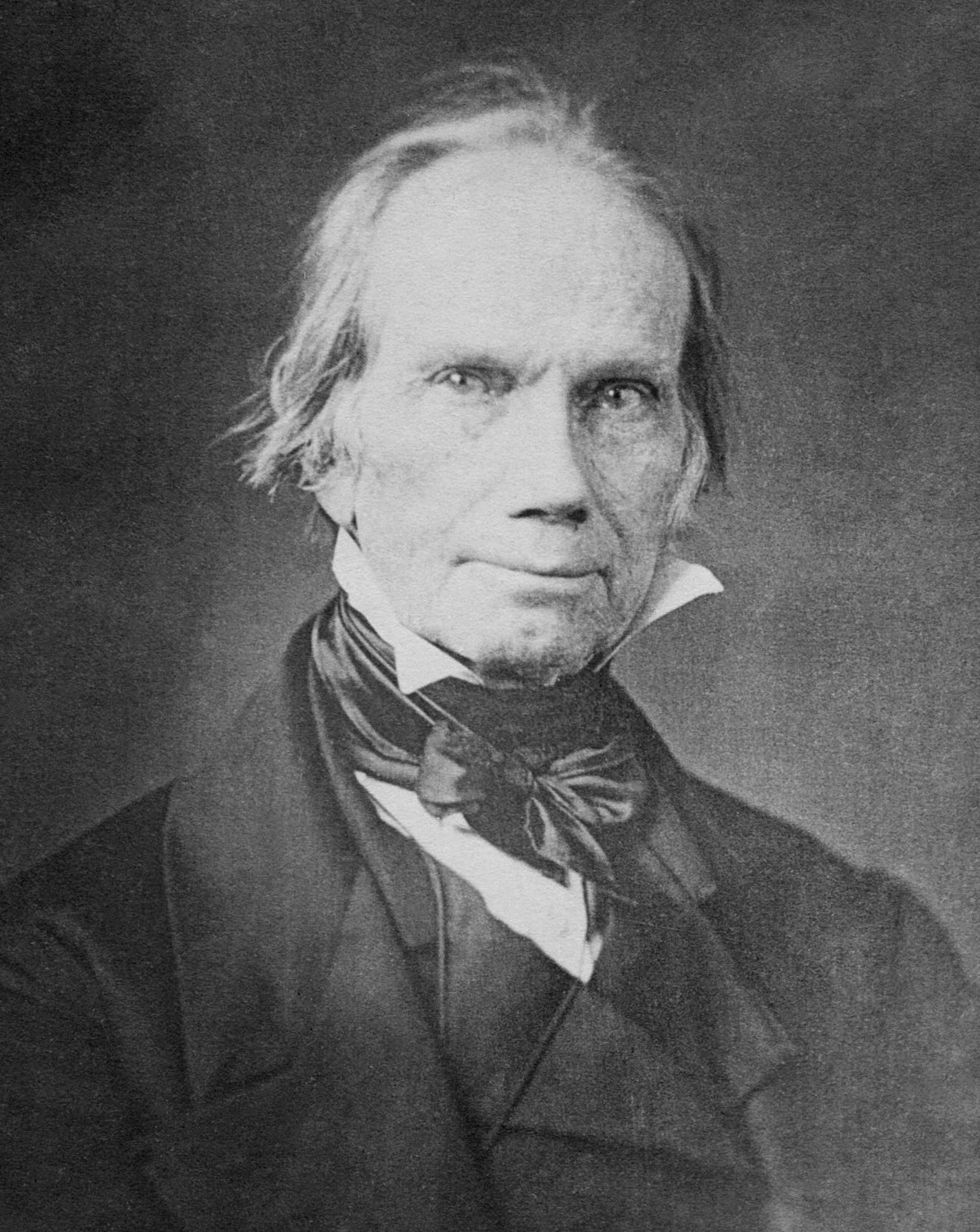

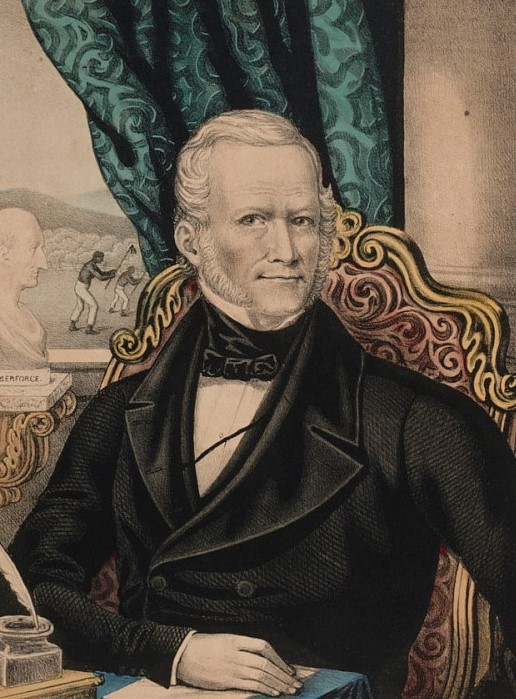
Nominee	Henry Clay	James K. Polk	James G. Birney
Party	Whig	Democratic	Liberty
Home state	Kentucky	Tennessee	Michigan
Running mate	Theodore Frelinghuysen	George M. Dallas	Thomas Morris
Electoral vote	6	0	0
Popular vote	26,780	18,049	3,970
Percentage	54.84%	36.96%	8.13%
County results
Clay
40–50%
50–60%
60–70%
Polk
40–50%
50–60%
President before election
John Tyler
Independent
Elected President
James K. Polk
Democratic

A presidential election was held in Vermont on November 12, 1844 as part of the 1844 United States presidential election. Voters chose six representatives, or electors to the Electoral College, who voted for President and Vice President.

Vermont voted for the Whig candidate, Henry Clay, over Democratic candidate James K. Polk and Liberty candidate James G. Birney. Clay won Vermont by a margin of 17.88%.

With 54.84% of the popular vote, Vermont would prove to be Henry Clay's second strongest state after Rhode Island. Vermont would also prove to be James G. Birney's third strongest state after New Hampshire and Massachusetts.

== Results ==
1844 United States presidential election in Vermont
Party	Candidate	Running mate	Popular vote		Electoral vote	
Party	Candidate	Running mate	Count	%	Count	%
Whig	Henry Clay of Kentucky	Theodore Frelinghuysen of New York	26,780	54.84%	6	100.00%
Democratic	James K. Polk of Tennessee	George M. Dallas of Pennsylvania	18,049	36.96%	0	0.00%
Liberty	James G. Birney of Michigan	Thomas Morris of Ohio	3,970	8.13%	0	0.00%
N/A	Others	Others	30	0.06%	0	0.00%
Total			48,829	100.00%	6	100.00%

== See also ==
- United States presidential elections in Vermont
