= 1800 United States presidential election in Maryland =

- 1800
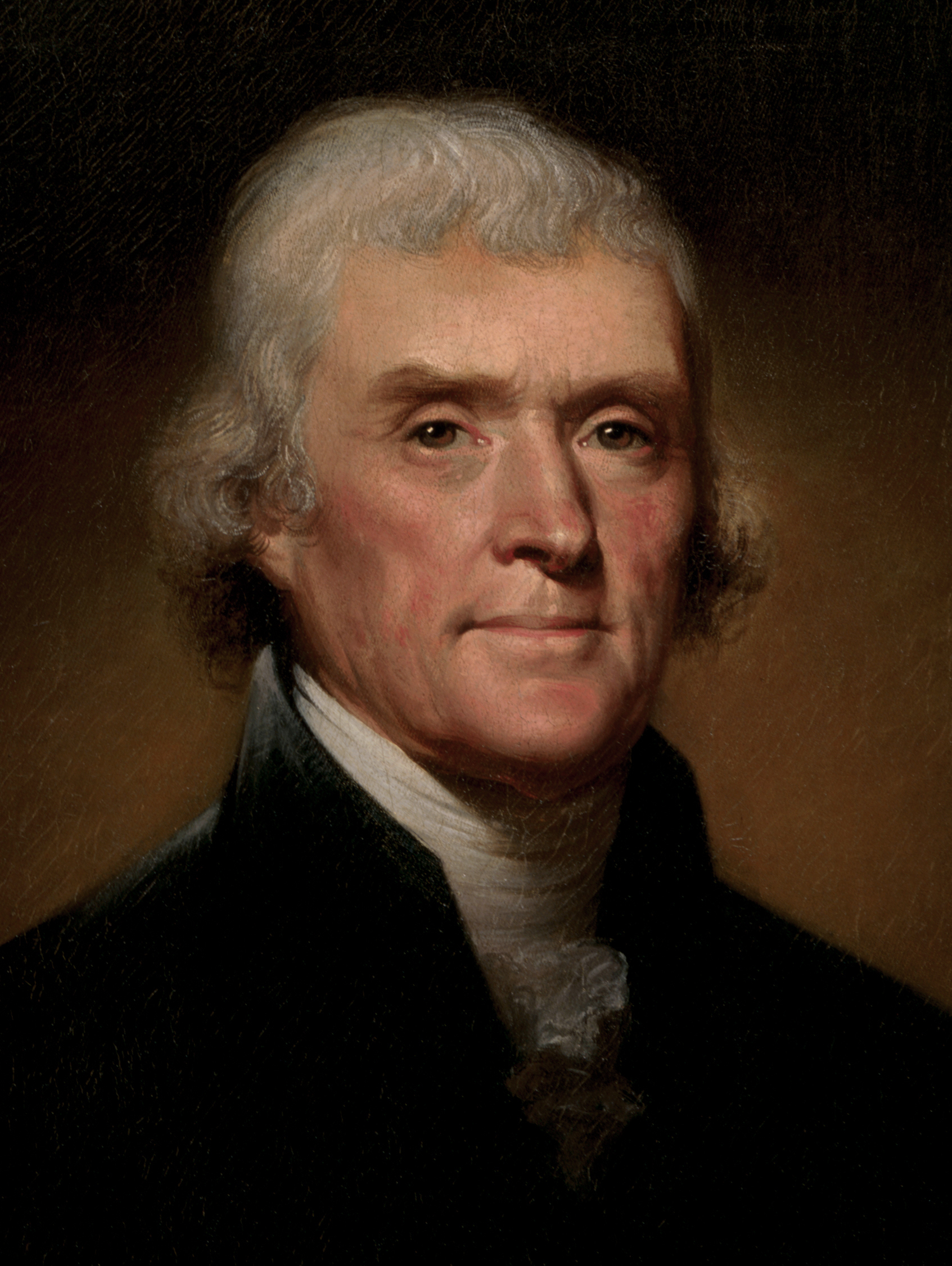

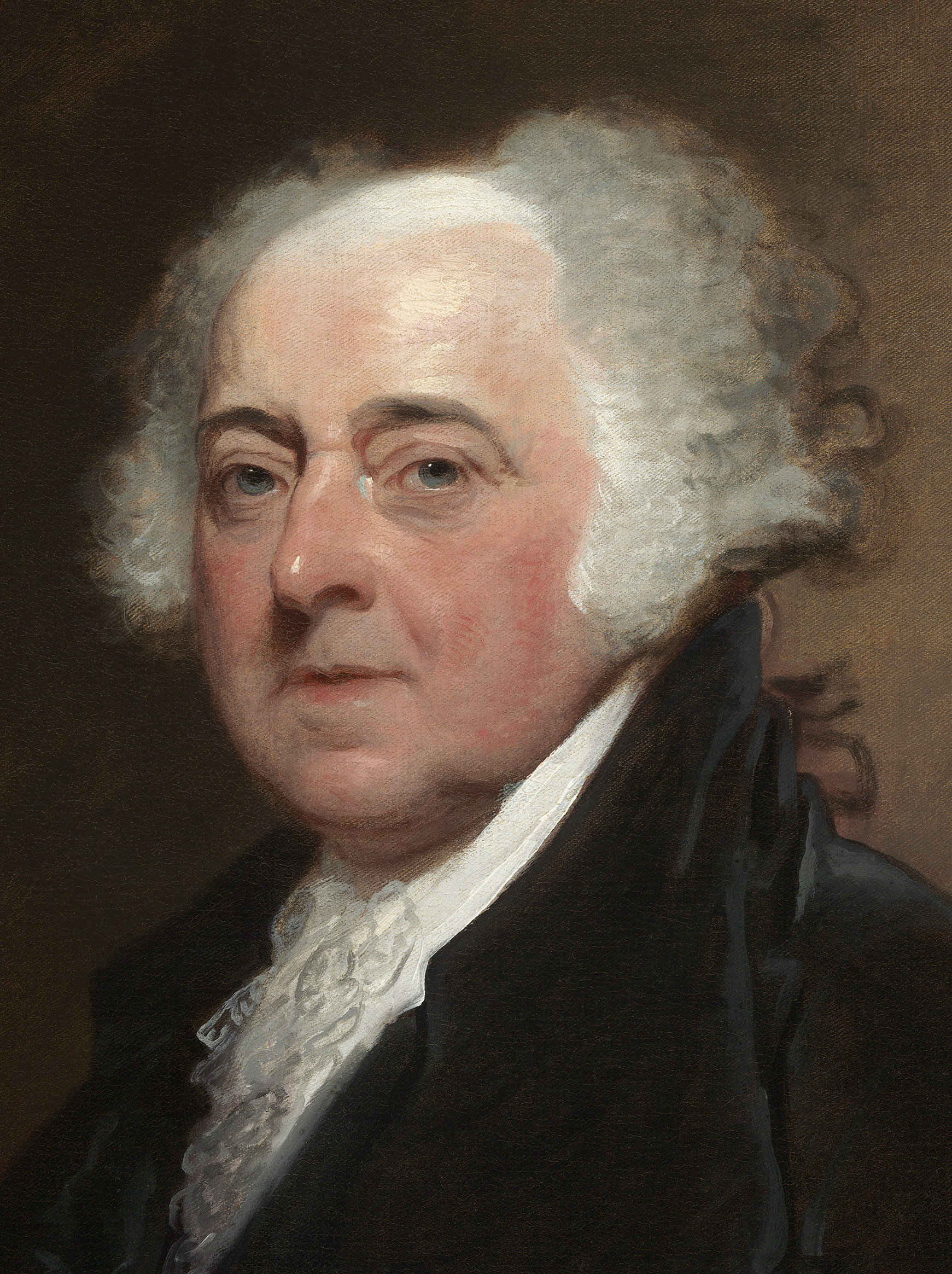
| Nominee | Thomas Jefferson | John Adams |
| Party | Democratic-Republican | Federalist |
| Home state | Virginia | Massachusetts |
| Electoral vote | 5 | 5 |
| Popular vote | 10,638 | 10,068 |
| Percentage | 51.35% | 48.60% |
County results
Jefferson
50–60%
60–70%
70–80%
90–100%
Adams
50–60%
60–70%
70–80%
90–100%
President before election
John Adams
Federalist
Elected President
Thomas Jefferson
Democratic-Republican

A presidential election was held in Maryland in the autumn of 1800, as part of the 1800 presidential election. Voters chose ten representatives, or electors, to the Electoral College, who voted for president and vice president.

Early elections were quite different from modern ones. Voters voted for individual electors, who were pledged to vote for certain candidates. Often, which candidate an elector intended to support was unclear. Prior to the ratification of the 12th amendment, each elector did not distinguish between a vote cast for president and vice president and simply cast two votes.

Starting with the 1796 United States presidential election and ending with the 1824 United States presidential election, Maryland used an electoral district system to choose its electors, with each district electing a single elector. This method is similar to the way Nebraska and Maine choose their electors in modern elections.

== Results ==
1800 United States presidential election in Maryland
| Party | Candidate | Votes | % |
|---|---|---|---|
| Democratic-Republican | Thomas Jefferson | 10,638 | 51.35% |
| Federalist | John Adams | 10,068 | 48.65% |
| Total votes | | 20,716 | 100% |

=== Results by county ===
1800 United States presidential election in Maryland
| County | John Adams Federalist | | Thomas Jefferson Democratic-Republican | | Margin | | Total votes |
| County | # | % | # | % | # | % | Total votes |
|---|---|---|---|---|---|---|---|
| Allegany | 364 | 63.75% | 207 | 36.25% | 157 | 27.50% | 571 |
| Anne Arundel | 336 | 27.59% | 882 | 72.41% | -546 | -44.82% | 1,218 |
| Baltimore | 234 | 21.73% | 843 | 78.27% | -609 | -56.54% | 1,077 |
| Baltimore City | 438 | 22.64% | 1,497 | 77.36% | -1,059 | -54.72% | 1,935 |
| Calvert | 163 | 73.76% | 58 | 26.24% | 105 | 47.52% | 221 |
| Caroline | 122 | 21.79% | 438 | 78.21% | -316 | -56.42% | 560 |
| Cecil | 415 | 40.89% | 600 | 59.11% | -185 | -18.22% | 1,015 |
| Charles | 611 | 98.39% | 10 | 1.61% | 601 | 96.78% | 621 |
| Dorchester | 659 | 77.53% | 191 | 22.47% | 468 | 55.06% | 850 |
| Frederick | 2,084 | 54.73% | 1,724 | 45.27% | 360 | 9.46% | 3,808 |
| Harford | 11 | 1.36% | 797 | 98.64% | -786 | -97.28% | 808 |
| Kent | 327 | 43.14% | 431 | 56.86% | -104 | -13.72% | 758 |
| Montgomery | 939 | 74.17% | 327 | 25.83% | 612 | 48.34% | 1,266 |
| Prince George's | 738 | 61.91% | 454 | 38.09% | 284 | 23.82% | 1,192 |
| Queen Anne's | 227 | 27.55% | 597 | 72.45% | -370 | -44.90% | 824 |
| St. Mary's | 340 | 100.00% | 0 | 0.00% | 340 | 100.00% | 340 |
| Somerset | 301 | 99.67% | 1 | 0.33% | 300 | 99.34% | 302 |
| Talbot | 264 | 38.32% | 425 | 61.68% | -161 | -23.36% | 689 |
| Washington | 978 | 46.09% | 1,144 | 53.91% | -166 | -7.82% | 2,122 |
| Worcester | 525 | 99.24% | 4 | 0.76% | 521 | 98.48% | 529 |
| Total | 10,076 | 48.66% | 10,630 | 51.34% | -554 | -2.68% | 20,706 |

=== Results by electoral district ===
Results by district
| District | Thomas Jefferson Democratic-Republican | | | John Adams Federalist | | | Margin | | Total votes cast |
| District | # | % | Electors | # | % | Electors | # | % | Total votes cast |
|---|---|---|---|---|---|---|---|---|---|
| 1 | 68 | 5.75% | 0 | 1,114 | 94.25% | 1 | -1,046 | -88.50% | 1,182 |
| 2 | 789 | 31.98% | 0 | 1,669 | 67.65% | 1 | -880 | -35.67% | 2,467 |
| 3 | 1,724 | 45.27% | 0 | 2,084 | 54.73% | 1 | -360 | -9.46% | 3,808 |
| 4 | 1,351 | 50.17% | 1 | 1,342 | 49.83% | 0 | 9 | 0.15% | 2,693 |
| 5 | 2,379 | 75.45% | 1 | 774 | 24.55% | 0 | 1,605 | 50.90% | 3,153 |
| 6 | 1,640 | 87.00% | 1 | 245 | 13.00% | 0 | 1,395 | 74.00% | 1,885 |
| 7 | 1,031 | 58.15% | 1 | 742 | 41.85% | 0 | 289 | 16.32% | 1,773 |
| 8 | 1,022 | 67.55% | 1 | 491 | 32.45% | 0 | 531 | 35.10% | 1,513 |
| 9 | 629 | 44.61% | 0 | 781 | 55.39% | 1 | -151 | -10.78% | 1,410 |
| 10 | 5 | 0.60% | 0 | 826 | 99.40% | 1 | -821 | -98.8% | 831 |
| Total | 10,638 | 51.35% | 5 | 10,068 | 48.60% | 5 | 570 | 2.75% | 20,706 |

==== Counties that flipped from Democratic-Republican to Federalist ====
- Prince George's

==== Counties that flipped from Federalist to Democratic-Republican ====
- Talbot

== See also ==
- United States presidential elections in Maryland
- 1800 United States presidential election
- 1800 United States elections
