= 1800 United States presidential election in New Hampshire =

- October 31 – December 3, 1800
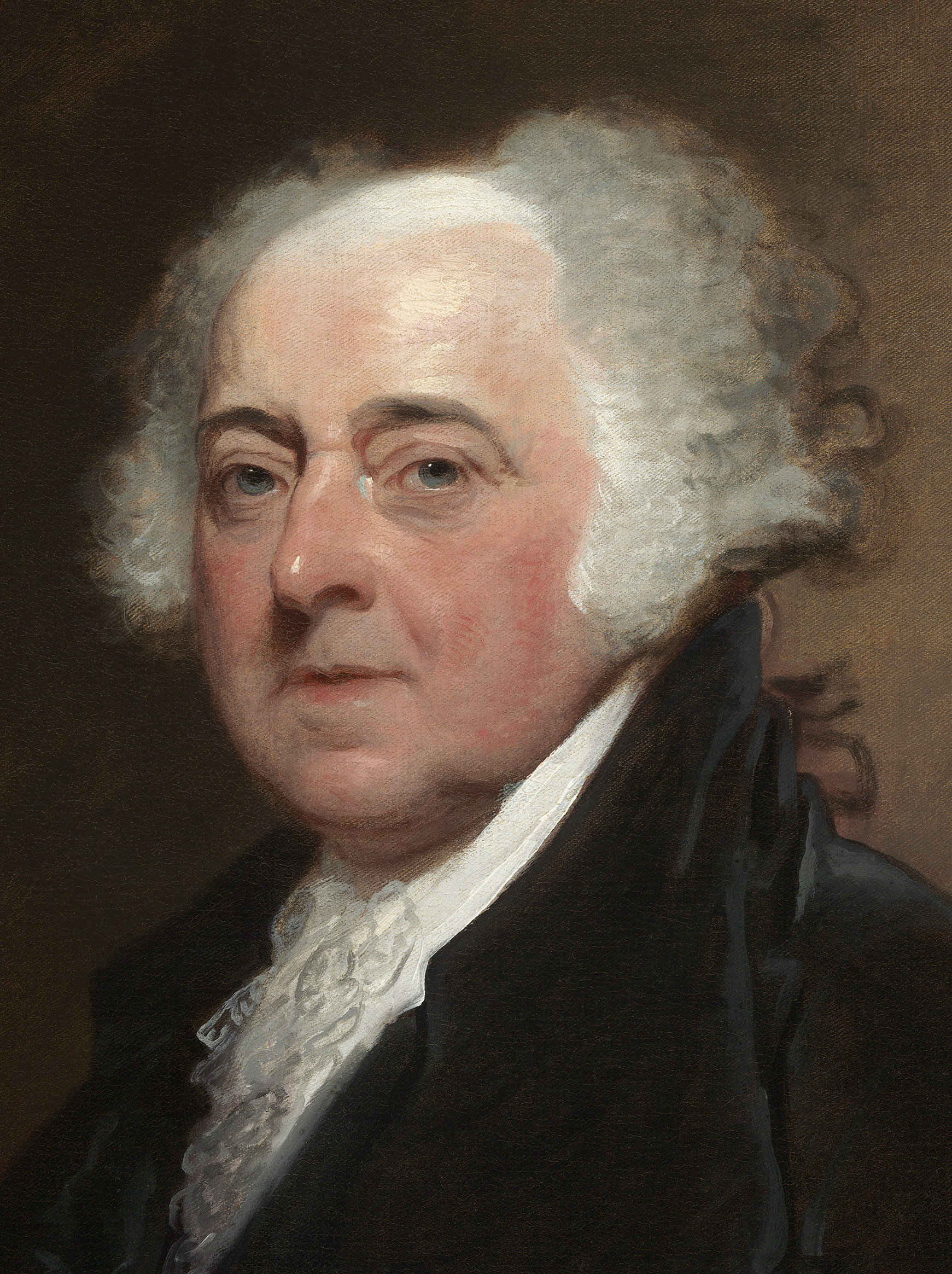

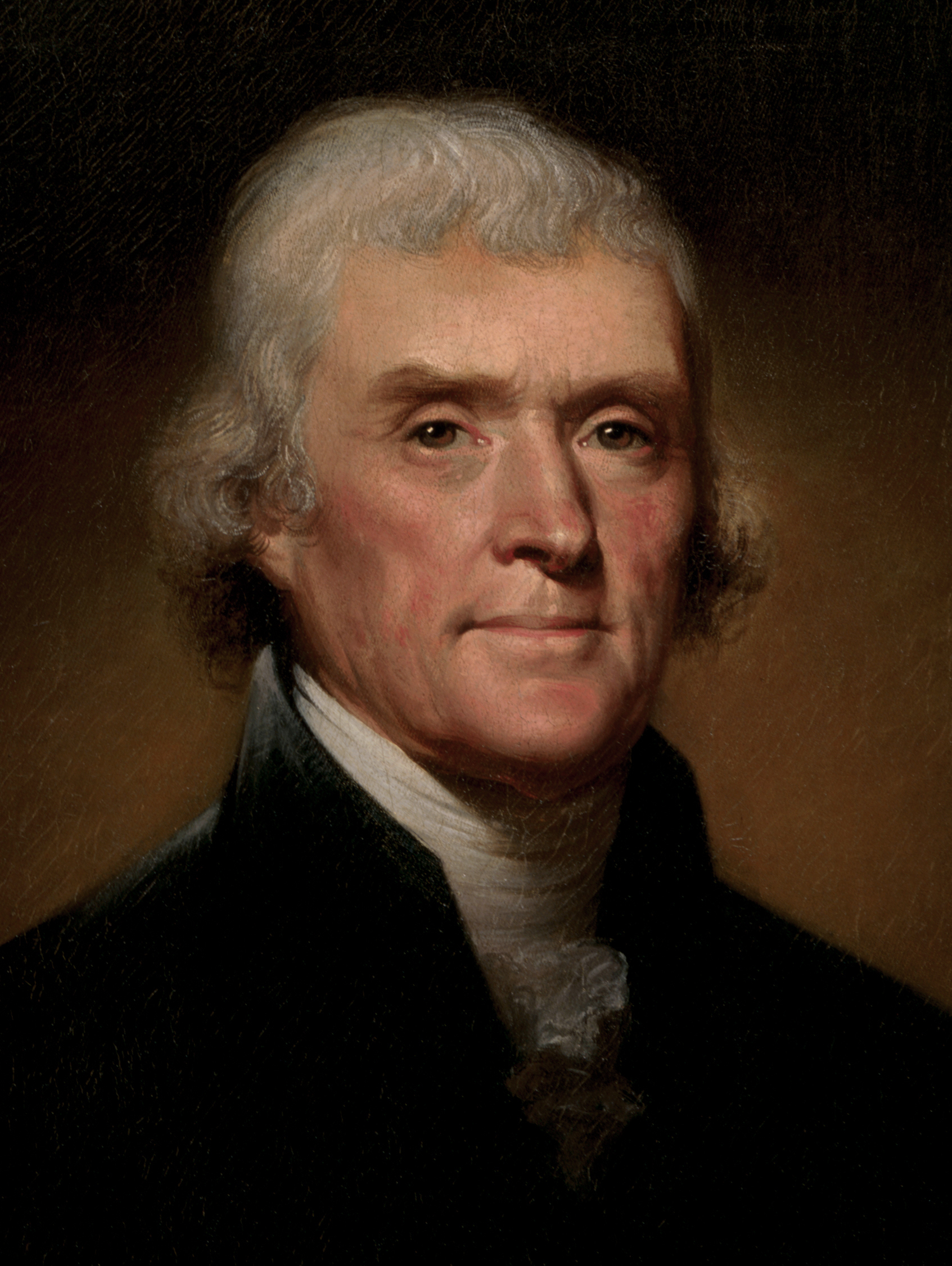
Nominee	John Adams	Thomas Jefferson
Party	Federalist	Democratic-Republican
Home state	Massachusetts	Virginia
Running mate	Charles Cotesworth Pinckney	Aaron Burr
Electoral vote	6	0
Popular vote	100.00%	0.00%
President before election
John Adams
Federalist
Elected President
Thomas Jefferson
Democratic-Republican

A presidential election was held in New Hampshire between October 31 to December 3, 1800, as part of the 1800 United States presidential election to elect the President. Voters chose five representatives, or electors to the Electoral College, who voted for President and Vice President.

New Hampshire voted for incumbent Federalist President John Adams over Democratic-Republican Vice President Thomas Jefferson, this is one of re–match presidential elections because both candidates were faced in the 1796 presidential election. However, Thomas Jefferson would win the national presidential election. Making this presidential election as the first time New Hampshire voted for a losing candidate in its presidential voting history.

== Results ==
1800 United States presidential election in New Hampshire
Party	Candidate	Votes	Percentage	Electoral votes
Federalist	John Adams (incumbent)	–	–	6
Democratic-Republican	Thomas Jefferson	–	–	–
Totals		–	–	6

== See also ==
- United States presidential elections in New Hampshire
