= 1800 United States presidential election in Kentucky =

- October 31 – December 11, 1800
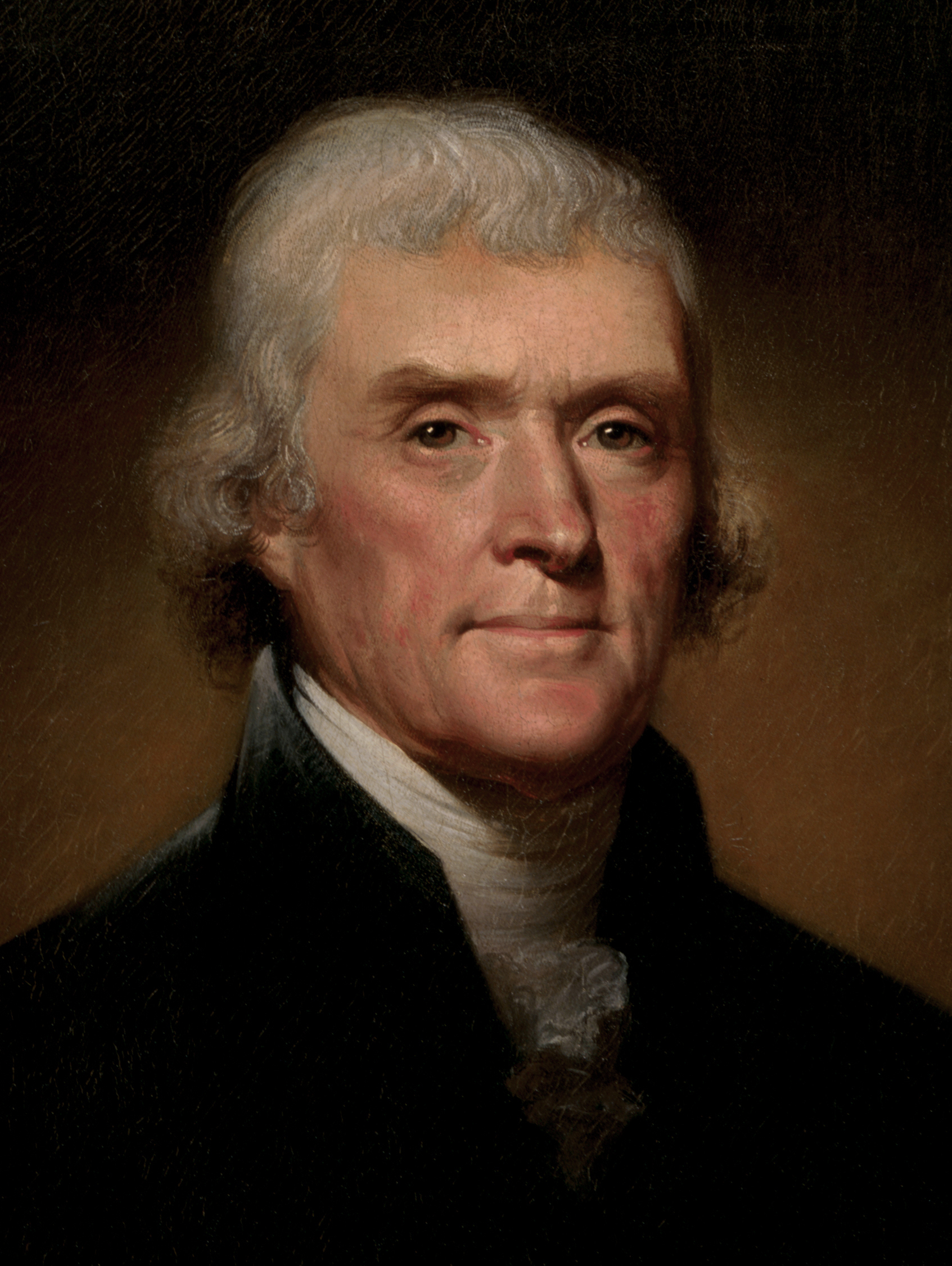

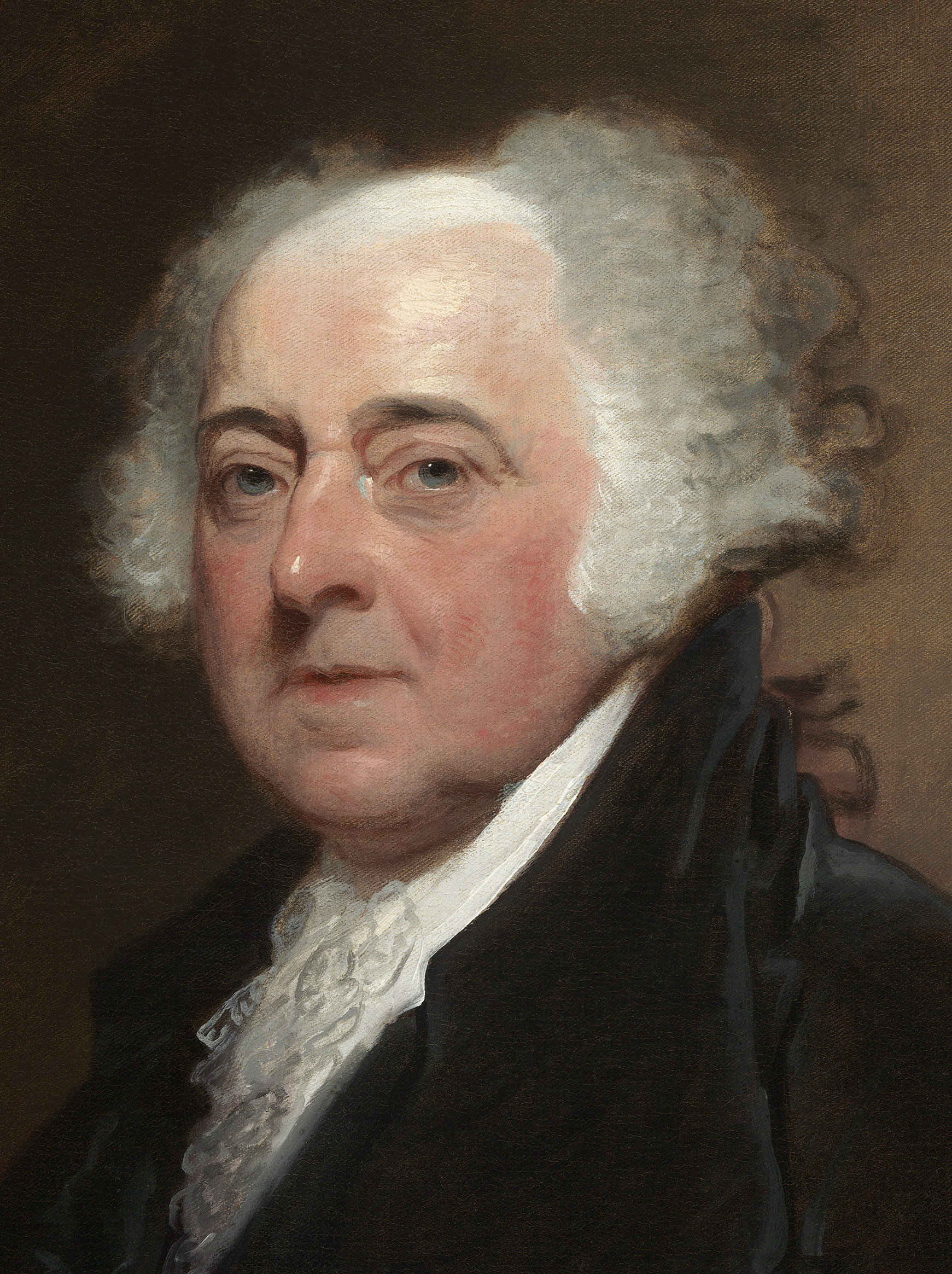
Nominee	Thomas Jefferson	John Adams
Party	Democratic-Republican	Federalist
Home state	Virginia	Massachusetts
Running mate	Aaron Burr	Charles Cotesworth Pinckney
Electoral vote	4	0
Popular vote	119	0
Percentage	100.00%	0.00%

A presidential election was held in Kentucky between October 31 and December 11, 1800, as part of the 1800 United States presidential election. Voters chose four representatives, or electors to the Electoral College, who voted for President and Vice President.

Kentucky cast four electoral votes for the Democratic-Republican candidate and incumbent Vice President Thomas Jefferson over the Federalist candidate and incumbent President John Adams. The electoral votes for Vice president were cast for Jefferson's running mate Aaron Burr from New York. The state was divided into two electoral districts with two electors each, whereupon each district's voters chose the electors. The only true popular vote figures still extant today are those of Franklin County.

== Results ==
1800 United States presidential election in Kentucky
Party	Candidate	Votes	Percentage	Electoral votes
Democratic-Republican	Thomas Jefferson	119	100.00%	4
Federalist	John Adams (incumbent)	0	0.00%	0
Totals		119	100.00%	4

=== Results by county ===
1800 United States presidential election in Kentucky
County	Thomas Jefferson Democratic-Republican		Margin		Total votes
County	#	%	#	%	Total votes
Barren	-	100.00%	-	100.00%	-
Boone	-	100.00%	-	100.00%	-
Bourbon	-	100.00%	-	100.00%	-
Bracken	-	100.00%	-	100.00%	-
Breckinridge	-	100.00%	-	100.00%	-
Bullitt	-	100.00%	-	100.00%	-
Campbell	-	100.00%	-	100.00%	-
Christian	-	100.00%	-	100.00%	-
Clarke	-	100.00%	-	100.00%	-
Cumberland	-	100.00%	-	100.00%	-
Fayette	-	100.00%	-	100.00%	-
Fleming	-	100.00%	-	100.00%	-
Floyd	-	100.00%	-	100.00%	-
Franklin	119	100.00%	119	100.00%	119
Gallatin	-	100.00%	-	100.00%	-
Garrard	-	100.00%	-	100.00%	-
Green	-	100.00%	-	100.00%	-
Hardin	-	100.00%	-	100.00%	-
Harrison	-	100.00%	-	100.00%	-
Henderson	-	100.00%	-	100.00%	-
Henry	-	100.00%	-	100.00%	-
Jefferson	-	100.00%	-	100.00%	-
Jessamine	-	100.00%	-	100.00%	-
Knox	-	100.00%	-	100.00%	-
Lincoln	-	100.00%	-	100.00%	-
Livingston	-	100.00%	-	100.00%	-
Logan	-	100.00%	-	100.00%	-
Madison	-	100.00%	-	100.00%	-
Mason	-	100.00%	-	100.00%	-
Mercer	-	100.00%	-	100.00%	-
Montgomery	-	100.00%	-	100.00%	-
Muhlenberg	-	100.00%	-	100.00%	-
Nelson	-	100.00%	-	100.00%	-
Nicholas	-	100.00%	-	100.00%	-
Ohio	-	100.00%	-	100.00%	-
Pendleton	-	100.00%	-	100.00%	-
Pulaski	-	100.00%	-	100.00%	-
Scott	-	100.00%	-	100.00%	-
Shelby	-	100.00%	-	100.00%	-
Warren	-	100.00%	-	100.00%	-
Washington	-	100.00%	-	100.00%	-
Woodford	-	100.00%	-	100.00%	-
Total	119	100.00%	119	100.00%	119

== See also ==
- United States presidential elections in Kentucky
