= 1800 United States presidential election =

Election of Thomas Jefferson

- October 30 – December 3, 1800

138 members of the Electoral College 70 electoral votes needed to win
- Turnout: 32.3% (▲12.2 pp)
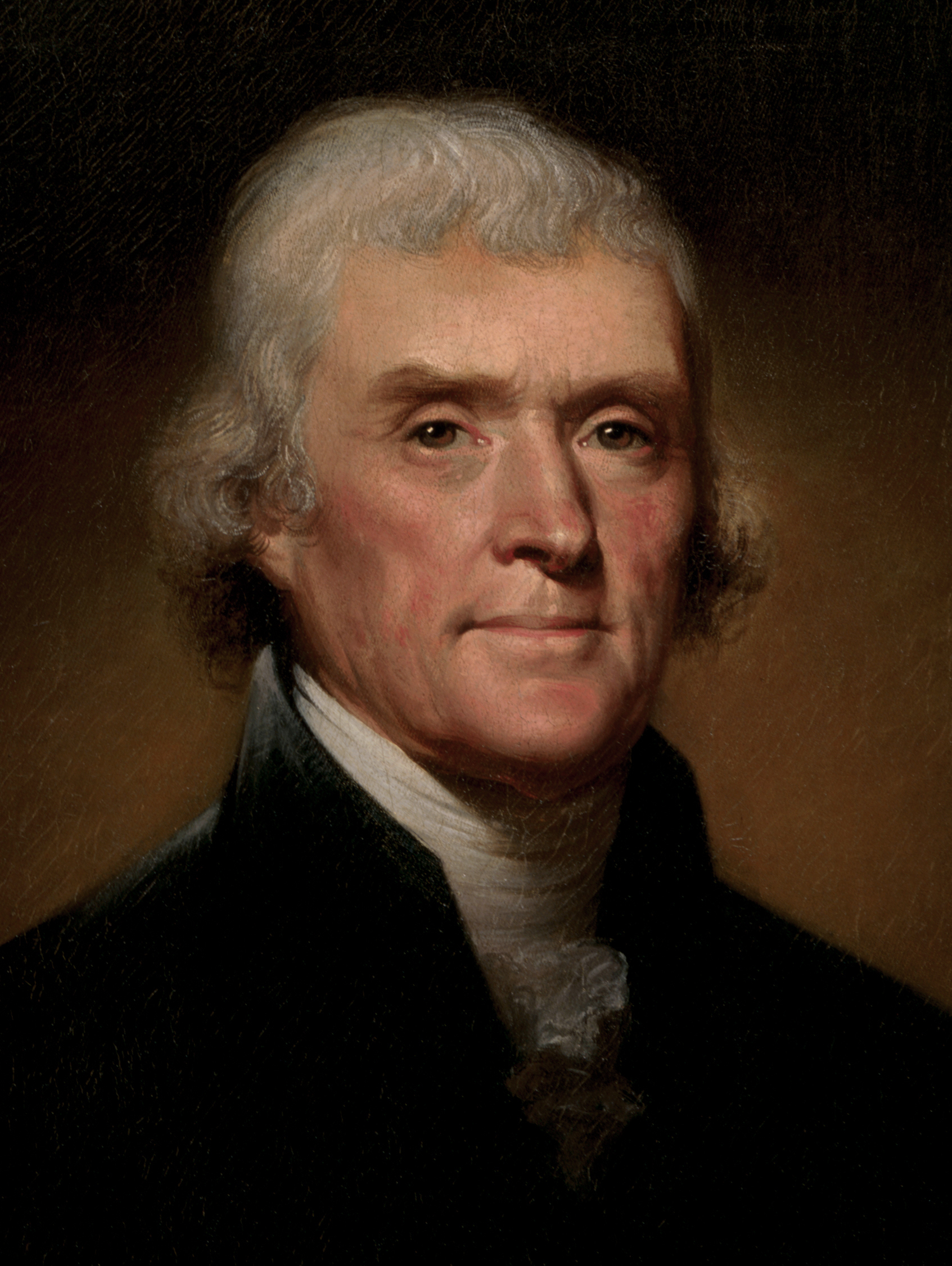

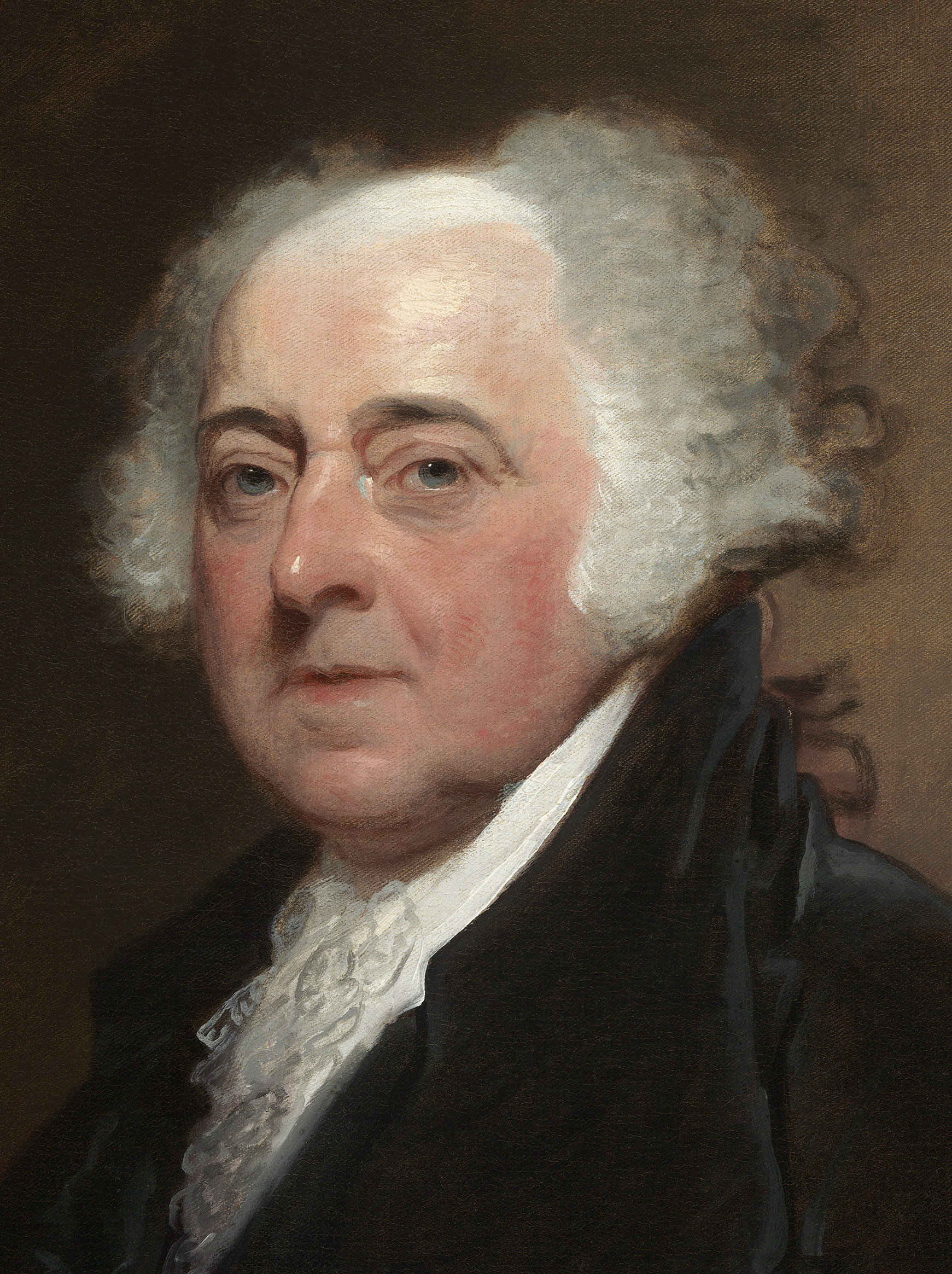
Nominee	Thomas Jefferson	John Adams
Party	Democratic-Republican	Federalist
Home state	Virginia	Massachusetts
Running mate	Aaron Burr	Charles Cotesworth Pinckney
Electoral vote	73 (Note: Each elector had two votes before the ratification of the Twelfth Amendment to the United States Constitution. Jefferson and Burr both received 73 votes, resulting in a tie. The United States House of Representatives subsequently elected Jefferson as president.)	65
States carried	9	7
Popular vote	45,511 (Note: Of the 16 states that took part in the 1800 election, six (Kentucky, Maryland, North Carolina, Rhode Island, Tennessee, and Virginia) used some kind of popular vote. Most returns from North Carolina exist, partial returns from Kentucky exist, and all returns from Tennessee have been lost.)	29,621
Percentage	60.6%	39.4%
- Presidential election results map. Green denotes states won by Jefferson, and salmon denotes states won by Adams. Numbers indicate the number of electoral votes cast by each state.
President before election
John Adams
Federalist
Elected President
Thomas Jefferson
Democratic-Republican
- 1801 contingent U.S. presidential election
- February 17, 1801 (36th ballot)

16 state delegations of the House of Representatives 9 state votes needed to win
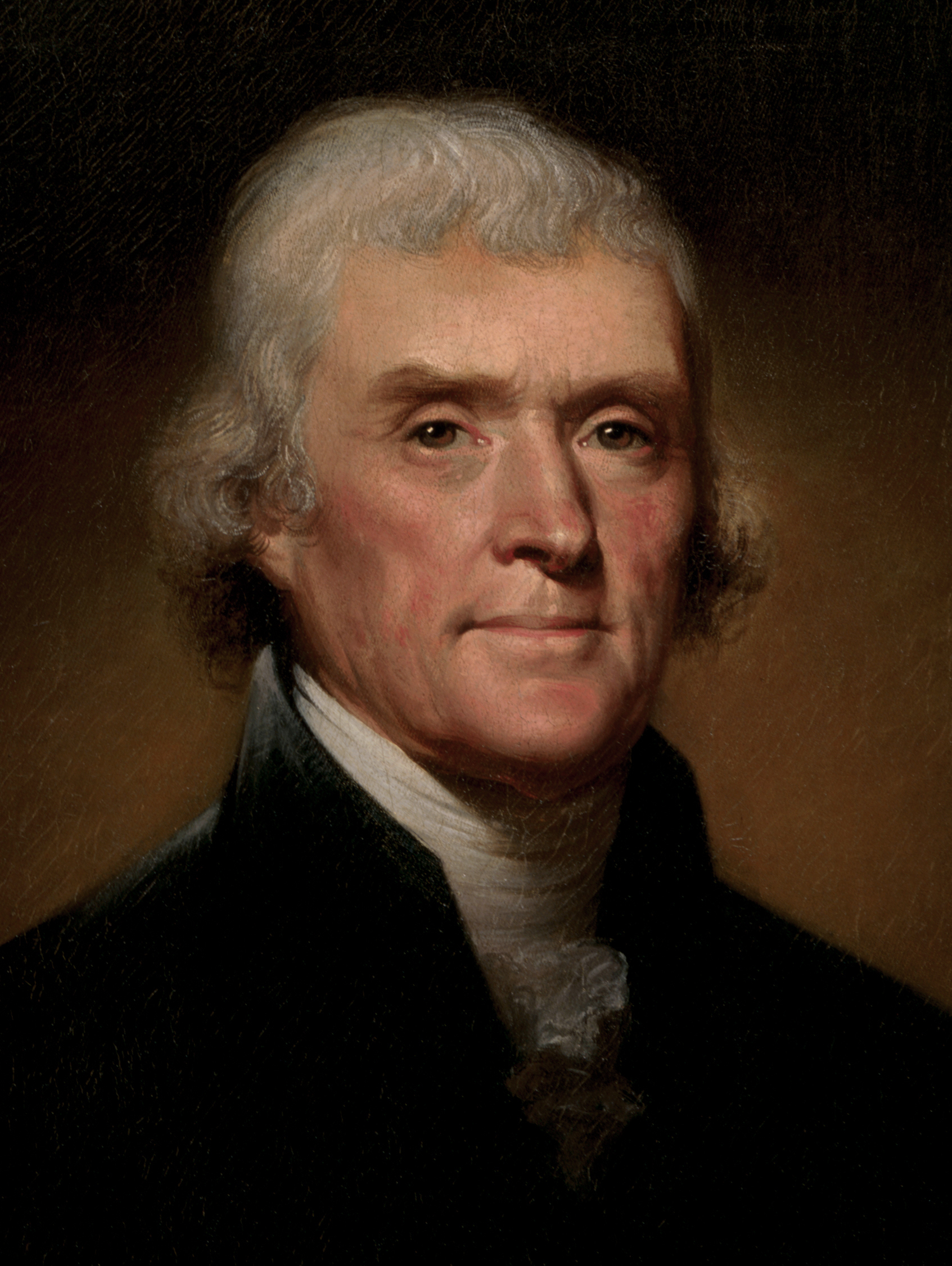

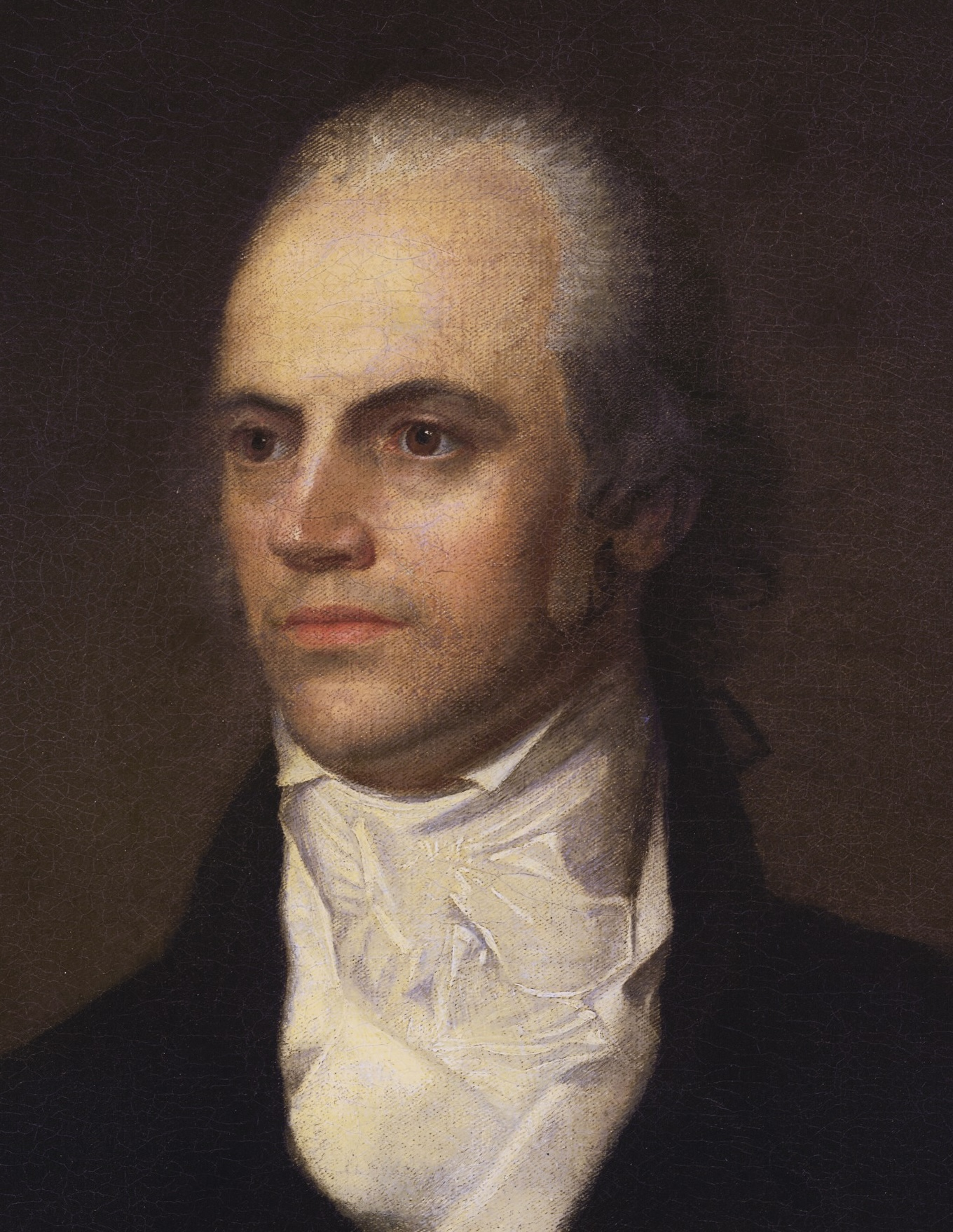
Candidate	Thomas Jefferson	Aaron Burr
Party	Democratic-Republican	Democratic-Republican
States carried	10	4
Percentage	62.5%	25.0%
- 1801 Contingent Election Results. Green denotes states voting for Jefferson and blue denotes states voting for Burr. States in grey cast blank ballots.

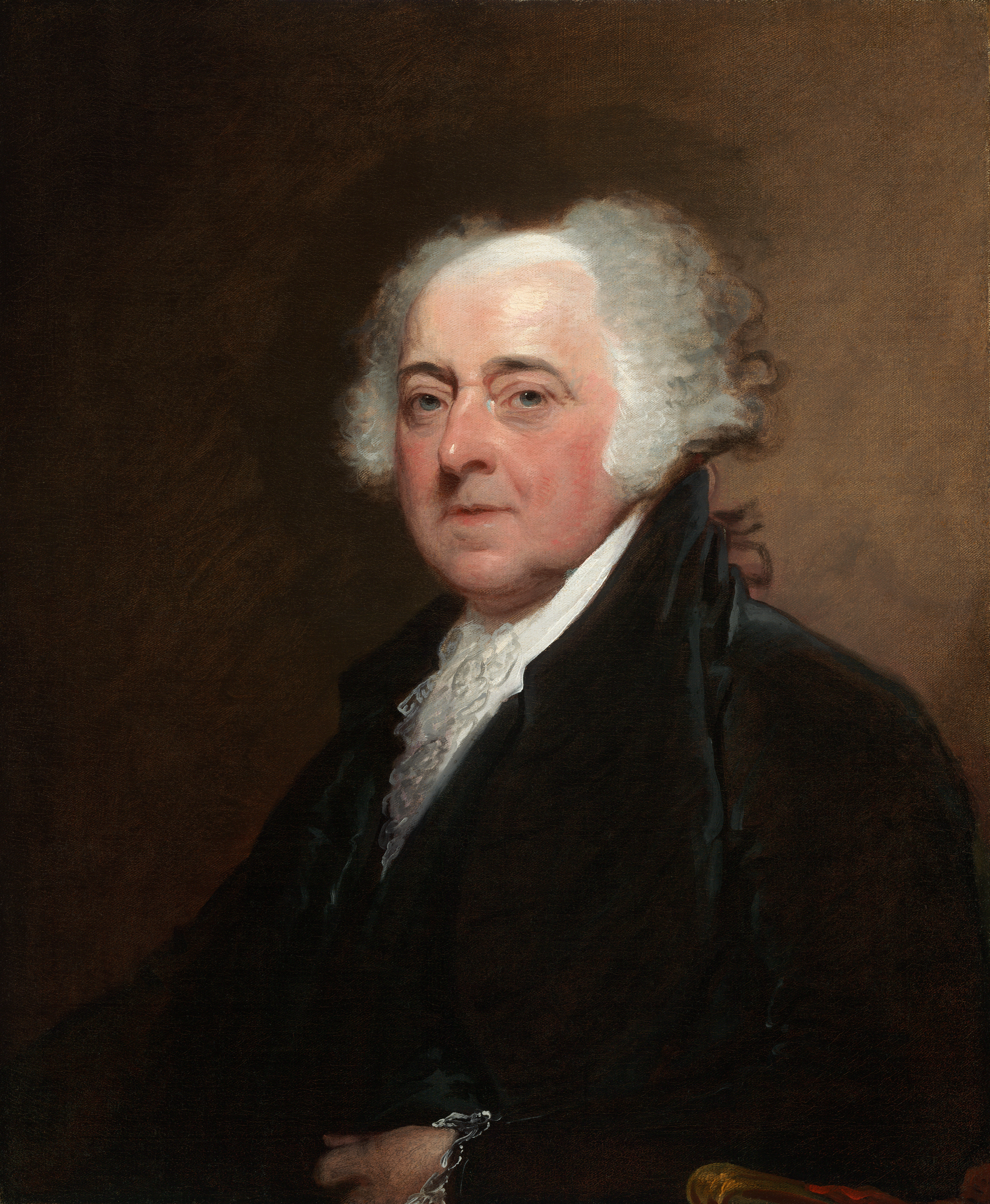
John Adams, the incumbent president in 1800, whose term expired on March 4, 1801

A presidential election was held in the United States from October 31 to December 3, 1800. In what is sometimes called the "Revolution of 1800", the Democratic-Republican Party candidate, Vice President Thomas Jefferson, defeated the Federalist Party candidate and incumbent, President John Adams in the first peaceful transfer of power in the history of the United States, creating a political realignment that ushered in a generation of Democratic-Republican leadership. This was the first presidential election in U.S. history to be a rematch, the first election where an incumbent president lost re-election, leading to the first time in modern history where a national government changed hands peaceably following a free election.

Adams had narrowly defeated Jefferson in the 1796 election. Under the rules of the electoral system in place before the 1804 ratification of the Twelfth Amendment to the United States Constitution, each member of the Electoral College cast two votes, with no distinction made between electoral votes for president and electoral votes for vice president. As Jefferson received the second-most votes in 1796, he was elected vice president.

In 1800, unlike in 1796, both parties formally nominated tickets. The Democratic-Republicans nominated a ticket consisting of Jefferson and Aaron Burr, while the Federalists nominated a ticket consisting of Adams and Charles Cotesworth Pinckney. To avoid a tie between running mates, each party planned to have one elector divert a vote away from their vice-presidential nominee.

The chief political issues revolved around the fallout from the French Revolution and the Quasi-War. The Federalists favored a strong central government and close relations with Great Britain. The Democratic-Republicans favored decentralization to the state governments, and the party attacked the taxes the Federalists imposed. The Democratic-Republicans also denounced the Alien and Sedition Acts, which the Federalists had passed to make it harder for immigrants to become citizens and to restrict statements critical of the federal government. The Democratic-Republicans were well organized at the state and local levels, while the Federalists were disorganized and suffered a bitter split between their two major leaders, Adams and Alexander Hamilton. According to historian John Ferling, the jockeying for electoral votes, regional divisions, and the propaganda smear campaigns created by both parties made the election recognizably modern.

At the end of a long and bitter campaign, Jefferson and Burr each won 73 electoral votes, Adams won 65, and Pinckney won 64. The Federalists swept New England, the Democratic-Republicans dominated the South, and the parties split the Mid-Atlantic states of New York, New Jersey, and Pennsylvania. However, the Democratic-Republicans failed to coordinate their ticket plan. They had assumed that one or more electors in Rhode Island, Vermont, New Jersey, Georgia, Kentucky, or Tennessee would vote for Jefferson and not Burr. None of those electors did, resulting in an unexpected tie, known as the Burr dilemma, forcing a contingent election in the House of Representatives.

Burr was accused of campaigning for the presidency himself in the contingent election despite being a member of Jefferson's party. Each state delegation cast one vote, and a victory in the contingent election required one candidate to win a majority of the state delegations. Neither Burr nor Jefferson was able to win on the first 35 ballots of the contingent election, as most Federalist representatives backed Burr and all Democratic-Republican representatives backed Jefferson. Hamilton favored Jefferson over Burr, and he convinced several Federalists to switch their support to Jefferson, giving Jefferson a victory on the 36th ballot. Jefferson became the second consecutive incumbent vice president to be elected president. This is one of two presidential elections (along with the 1824 election) that have been decided in the House.

== Candidates ==
Both parties used congressional nominating caucuses to formally nominate tickets for the first time. The Federalists nominated a ticket consisting of incumbent President John Adams of Massachusetts and Charles Cotesworth Pinckney of South Carolina. Pinckney had fought in the American Revolutionary War and later served as the minister to France. The Democratic-Republicans nominated a ticket consisting of Vice President Thomas Jefferson of Virginia and former Senator Aaron Burr of New York. Jefferson had been the runner-up in the previous election and had co-founded the party with James Madison and others, while Burr was popular in the electorally important state of New York.

=== Democratic-Republican candidates ===
Democratic-Republican Party 1800 Democratic-Republican Party ticket
Thomas Jefferson	Aaron Burr
for President	for Vice President
Vice President of the United States (1790–1801)	Former U.S. Senator from New York (1791–1797)

=== Federalist candidates ===
Federalist Party 1800 Federalist Party ticket
John Adams	Charles Cotesworth Pinckney
for President	for Vice President
President of the United States (1797–1801)	Former Minister to France (1796-1797)

== General election ==
=== Campaign ===
While the 1800 election was a re-match of the 1796 election, it ushered in a new type of American politics, a two-party republic and acrimonious campaigning behind the scenes and through the press. On top of this, the election pitted the "larger than life" Adams and Jefferson, who were formerly close allies turned political enemies.

The campaign was bitter and characterized by slander and personal attacks on both sides. Federalists spread rumors that the Democratic-Republicans were radical atheists who would ruin the country (based on the Democratic-Republican support for the French Revolution). In 1798, George Washington had complained "that you could as soon scrub the blackamoor white, as to change the principles of a professed Democrat; and that he will leave nothing unattempted to overturn the Government of this Country". Meanwhile, the Democratic-Republicans accused Federalists of subverting republican principles with the Alien and Sedition Acts. They also accused Federalists of favoring Britain in its war with France in order to promote aristocratic, anti-democratic values.

Ideology played a central role with a Jeffersonian "left" supporting the French Revolution, versus a Federalist "right" opposing it. According to historian Peter R. Henriques, "Federalists tilted to the right; Republicans, to the left." He quotes a Federalist editor who summarized the Federalist rhetoric:

You who are for French notions of government; for the tempestuous sea of anarchy and misrule; for arming the poor against the rich; for fraternizing with the foes of God and man; go to the left and support the leaders, or dupes of the anti-federal junto. But you that are sober, industrious, thriving, and happy, give your votes for those men who mean to preserve the union of the states, the purity and vigor of our excellent constitution, the sacred majesty of the laws, and the holy ordinances of religion.

==== Adams versus Hamilton ====
Adams was attacked by both the opposition Democratic-Republicans and a group of so-called "High Federalists" aligned with Alexander Hamilton. The Democratic-Republicans felt that the Adams foreign policy was too favorable toward Britain; feared that the new army called up for the Quasi-War would oppress the people; opposed new taxes to pay for war; and attacked the Alien and Sedition Acts as violations of states' rights and the Constitution. "High Federalists" considered Adams too moderate and would have preferred the leadership of Alexander Hamilton instead.

Hamilton had apparently grown impatient with Adams and wanted a new president who was more receptive to his goals. During Washington's presidency, Hamilton had been able to influence the federal response to the Whiskey Rebellion (which threatened the government's power to tax citizens). When Washington announced that he would not seek a third term, the Federalists and Adams regarded himself as next-in-line.

Hamilton appears to have hoped in 1796 that his influence within an Adams administration would be as great as or greater than in Washington's. By 1800, Hamilton had come to realize that Adams was too independent and thought the Federalist vice presidential candidate, Charles Cotesworth Pinckney of South Carolina, more suited to serving Hamilton's interests. In his third sabotage attempt toward Adams, Hamilton quietly schemed to elect Pinckney to the presidency. Given Pinckney's lack of political experience, he would have been expected to be open to Hamilton's influence. However, Hamilton's plan backfired and hurt the Federalist party, particularly after one of his letters, a scathing criticism of Adams that was fifty-four pages long, fell into the hands of a Democratic-Republican and soon after became public. It embarrassed Adams and damaged Hamilton's efforts on behalf of Pinckney, not to mention speeding Hamilton's own political decline.

The contemporarily unorthodox public campaigning methods employed in 1800 were first employed by Jefferson's running mate and campaign manager, Aaron Burr, who is credited by some historians with inventing the modern electioneering process. Yet, throughout this entire process, the candidates themselves were conspicuously missing from the campaigning, at least publicly, due to fears that they may otherwise be tagged as "demagogues". Even a visit John Adams made to Washington was made into a public point of contention.

==== Selection method changes ====
Partisans on both sides sought any advantage they could find. In several states, this included changing the process of selecting electors to ensure the desired result. In Georgia, Democratic-Republican legislators replaced the popular vote with selection by the state legislature. In Virginia, the Democratic-Republican-controlled legislature switched from electoral districts to a general ticket, a winner-take-all system. Federalist legislators also switched methods, switching from districts and general tickets to legislature votes in Massachusetts and New Hampshire, respectively.

In Pennsylvania, the General Assembly was split, with the Democratic-Republican-dominated House wishing to retain the general ticket and the Federalist-controlled Senate wishing to return to the district system, hoping to win at least some electoral votes. Eventually, this deadlock was broken by a last-minute compromise between the chambers that gave the Democratic-Republican eight electors and the Federalists seven.

In New York, the rejection to change the selection method backfired on the Federalists. In March 1800, two months before the assembly elections, the Democratic-Republicans attempted to pass a bill that would switch from a legislature vote to electoral districts, hoping they would secure at least a third of the state's seats. The Federalists defeated the measure, believing that they would win control of both chambers and award all of the state's electoral votes to the Federalist nominees. However, in the April state elections, Aaron Burr's effective mobilization of the vote in New York City led to a reversal of the Federalist majority in the state legislature, providing crucial support for the Democratic-Republican ticket.

In response to the Federalist defeat, Hamilton attempted to get Governor John Jay to call a special session of the outgoing Federalist-dominated New York legislature. Hamilton's plan was for the outgoing assembly to pass legislation that would establish the popular election of electors through electoral districts, a strategy almost certain to secure nine or ten of the twelve elector slots for the Federalists. Jay refused to participate in such an underhanded scheme.

The Federalist legislature in Connecticut did not change the method of voting but instead passed a "stand up" election law, mandating that all votes be cast publicly and orally, an intimidating procedure that ordinarily favored those in power.

=== Voting ===
Results by county explicitly indicating the percentage of the winning candidate in each county. Shades of green are for Jefferson (Democratic-Republican) and shades of orange are for Adams (Federalist). Areas where voting records are missing or did not occur are in dark gray. Territories are in light gray.

Because each state could choose its own day to elect its electors in 1800, before Election Day on December 3, when electors "meet in their respective States, and vote by Ballot for two Persons, of whom one at least shall not be an Inhabitant of the same State with themselves" in accordance with the Constitution, the voting lasted from October to December. As election day neared, the election was too close to call. The last state to vote, South Carolina, chose its electors on December 2, and would become key to determining the election. The state elections in mid-October had produced an assembly that was about evenly divided between committed Federalists and Republicans, with 16 unaffiliated representatives who were all strongly pro-Jefferson. Many of the elected Jeffersonians were also supporters of Pinckney, the revered native son of the state. If South Carolina's electors gave their votes to Jefferson and Pinckney, then Pinckney would place an electoral vote behind Jefferson, becoming the vice president.

However, Pinckney stayed loyal to the instructions of his party's caucus and was adamant that any elector who voted for him must also vote for Adams. With uncommitted legislators not willing to desert Jefferson and Pinckney unwilling to abandon Adams, the uncommitted legislators eventually reluctantly agreed to support Burr.

Under the United States Constitution as it then stood, each elector cast two votes, and the candidate with a majority of the votes was elected president, with the vice presidency going to the runner-up. The Federalists therefore arranged for one of their Rhode Island electors to vote for John Jay instead of Charles Pinckney to prevent the election from resulting in a tie. A letter to Jefferson from Peter Freneau assured him that a member of the Republican delegation from South Carolina would vote for George Clinton instead of Aaron Burr and a report from Georgia indicated that two of its electors would deny Burr their votes. However, this information proved faulty. Thus, all of the Democratic-Republican electors cast their votes for both Jefferson and Burr, 73 in all for each of them. According to a provision of the United States Constitution, a tie in a case of this type had to be resolved by the House of Representatives, with each state casting one vote. Although the congressional election of 1800 turned over majority control of the House of Representatives to the Democratic-Republicans by 68 seats to 38, the presidential election had to be decided by the outgoing House that had been elected in the congressional election of 1798 (at that time, the new presidential and congressional terms all started on March 4 of the year after a national election). In the outgoing House, the Federalists had a majority of 60 seats to 46.

=== Disputes ===
==== Defective certificate ====
When the electoral ballots were opened and counted on February 11, 1801, the certificate of election from Georgia was different than the others. Georgia had sent the original oral ballot. In 2004, David Fontana and Bruce Ackerman asserted that Georgia's certificate did not take the constitutionally mandated form of a "List of all the Persons voted for, and of the Number of Votes for each". They claimed that Vice President Jefferson, who was presiding over the counting of electoral votes in his role as President of the Senate, immediately counted the votes from Georgia as votes for Jefferson and Burr, though they observed that "no objections were raised". If the Georgia ballots had been rejected based on these supposed irregularities, Jefferson and Burr would have been left with 69 votes each, or one short of the 70 votes required for a majority, meaning a contingent election would have been required between the top five finishers (Jefferson, Burr, incumbent president John Adams, Charles C. Pinckney, and John Jay) in the House of Representatives. With these votes, the total number of votes for Jefferson and Burr was 73, which gave them a majority of the total, but they were tied.

Holly Brewer, a legal historian, argued that the counting of the Georgia ballot did not support Ackerman and Fontana's theory. Brewer contends that the ballot did in fact comply with constitutional requirements, since it contained a list of all four electoral college votes for both Jefferson and Burr respectively (and only them); the constitutionally required certification language was contained on the outside of the envelope; and the ballot was not understood to be irregular under the election practices of the day. Brewer's arguments helped to influence Vice President Pence's decision to reject the theory that he had such powers, via Judge J. Michael Luttig.

== Results ==
Electoral College result (first vote)

Electoral College result (second vote)

Jefferson and Burr carried every state that had supported the Democratic-Republicans in 1796, made gains in Maryland, and picked up Burr's home state of New York. In the six states choosing electors by some form of popular vote, they won a landslide over Adams and Pinckney, polling 15,846 more votes than the Federalist ticket. Adams made gains in Pennsylvania and North Carolina, but these votes were not enough to offset the Democratic-Republican gains elsewhere. Of the 155 counties and independent cities making returns, Jefferson and Burr won in 115 (74.19%), whereas the Adams ticket carried 40 (25.81%). This was the last time that Vermont voted for the Federalists and the last time a Federalist won electoral votes from Pennsylvania. This was the first of two elections contested between people who would at some point serve as vice president, the other being 1968.

Presidential candidate	Party	Home state	Popular vote (Note: Votes for Federalist electors have been assigned to John Adams and votes for Democratic-Republican electors have been assigned to Thomas Jefferson.) (Note: Only 6 of the 16 states chose electors by any form of popular vote.) (Note: Those states that did choose electors by popular vote had widely varying restrictions on suffrage via property requirements.)		Electoral vote
Presidential candidate	Party	Home state	Count	Percentage	Electoral vote
Thomas Jefferson	Democratic-Republican	Virginia	45,511	60.6%	73
Aaron Burr	Democratic-Republican	New York	—	—	73
John Adams (incumbent)	Federalist	Massachusetts	29,621	39.4%	65
Charles Cotesworth Pinckney	Federalist	South Carolina	—	—	64
John Jay	Federalist	New York	—	—	1
Other (Note: Eight votes were cast for electors pledged to both Adams and Jefferson; 2 votes were cast for electors of unknown affiliation.)			10	<0.1%	0
Total			75,142	100.0%	138
Needed to win					70

Popular vote
Jefferson	60.57%
Adams	39.42%
Other	0.01%

Electoral vote (Note: Electors voted for two candidates; percentages are calculated as a share of the total number of electors.)
Jefferson	52.9%
Burr	52.9%
Adams	47.1%
Pinckney	46.4%
Jay	0.7%

=== Electoral College vote by state ===
State	Electoral votes	TJ	AB	JA	CP	JJ
Connecticut	9	—	—	9	9	—
Delaware	3	—	—	3	3	—
Georgia	4	4	4	—	—	—
Kentucky	4	4	4	—	—	—
Maryland	10	5	5	5	5	—
Massachusetts	16	—	—	16	16	—
New Hampshire	6	—	—	6	6	—
New Jersey	7	—	—	7	7	—
New York	12	12	12	—	—	—
North Carolina	12	8	8	4	4	—
Pennsylvania	15	8	8	7	7	—
Rhode Island	4	—	—	4	3	1
South Carolina	8	8	8	—	—	—
Tennessee	3	3	3	—	—	—
Vermont	4	—	—	4	4	—
Virginia	21	21	21	—	—	—
TOTAL	138	73	73	65	64	1
TO WIN	70					

== Results by state ==
Of the 16 states that took part in the 1800 election, six (Kentucky, Maryland, North Carolina, Rhode Island, Tennessee, and Virginia) used some kind of popular vote. In Rhode Island and Virginia, voters elected their state's entire Electoral College delegation at large; Kentucky, Maryland, North Carolina, and Tennessee all used some variation of single-member districts. In the rest, electors were chosen by the state legislature. Not until the 1836 presidential election would all states have direct popular selection of electors (except South Carolina, which had its state legislature vote for electors until 1868). Popular vote records for several states are incomplete, and the returns from Kentucky and Tennessee appear to have been lost; states did not print or issue electoral ballots, and most were issued by newspapers that supported a particular party or candidate. Newspapers are also the main source of voting records in the early 19th century, and frontier states such as Tennessee had few in operation, without any known surviving examples. Below are the surviving popular vote figures as published in A New Nation Votes.

		Jefferson/Burr Democratic-Republican			Adams/Pinckney Federalist			Other			Margin		State total	Citation
State	Electoral votes	#	%	Electoral votes	#	%	Electoral votes	#	%	Electoral votes	#	%	#	
Connecticut	9	No popular vote		—	No popular vote		9	No popular vote		—	No popular vote		—	
Delaware	3	No popular vote		—	No popular vote		3	No popular vote		—	No popular vote		—	
Georgia	4	No popular vote		4	No popular vote		—	No popular vote		—	No popular vote		—	
Kentucky (Note: The complete returns for Kentucky appear to have been lost. Partial returns from the 2nd district of Kentucky show 75 votes for Charles Scott, a Democratic-Republican, and 44 votes for Judge Caleb Wallace, also a Democratic-Republican.)	4	119+	100	4	No candidate		—	No candidate		—	119+	100	119+	
Maryland (Note: Eight votes were cast in Maryland for electors pledged to both John Adams and Thomas Jefferson; two votes were cast for electors of unknown affiliation.)	10	10,638	51.35	5	10,068	48.60	5	10	0.05	—	560	2.70	20,716	
Massachusetts	16	No popular vote		—	No popular vote		16	No popular vote		—	—		—	
New Hampshire	6	No popular vote		—	No popular vote		6	No popular vote		—	—		—	
New Jersey	7	No popular vote		—	No popular vote		7	No popular vote		—	—		—	
New York	12	No popular vote		12	No popular vote		—	No popular vote		—	—		—	
North Carolina (Note: Results from the Edenton district appear to have been lost. The Jefferson/Burr elector in the district ran unopposed)	12	11,593	51.26	8	11,025	48.75	4	No candidate		—	568	2.52	22,618	
Pennsylvania	15	No popular vote		8	No popular vote		7	No popular vote		—	—		—	
Rhode Island	4	2,159	47.85	—	2,353	52.15	4	No candidate		—	-194	-4.30	4,512	
South Carolina	8	No popular vote		8	No popular vote		—	No popular vote		—	—		—	
Tennessee (Note: The returns appear to have been lost.)	3	No data		3	No data		—	No data		—	No data		No data	
Vermont	4	No popular vote		—	No popular vote		4	No popular vote		—	—		—	
Virginia	21	21,002	77.28	21	6,175	22.72	—	No candidate		—	14,827	54.56	27,177	
TOTALS	138	45,511	60.57	73	29,621	39.42	65	10	0.01	0	15,880	21.14	75,142	
TO WIN	70													

=== District results ===
Results by elector districts explicitly indicating the percentage of the winning candidate in each district. District boundaries or results for Tennessee could not be found.

Kentucky, Maryland, North Carolina, and Tennessee chose each of their electors from specially-drawn single-member districts, the results from which are as follows.

	Thomas Jefferson Democratic-Republican		John Adams Federalist		Other		Margin		District total	Citation
District	#	%	#	%	#	%	#	%	#	
Kentucky-1 (Note: Matthew Walton, the losing candidate, was also a Democratic-Republican)	No data	100	No candidate		No candidate		No data	100	No data	
Kentucky-2	119+	100	No candidate		No candidate		119+	100	119+	
Kentucky-3 (Note: The Jefferson/Burr elector in this district ran unopposed)	No data	100	No candidate		No candidate		No data	100	No data	
Kentucky-4	No data	100	No candidate		No candidate		No data	100	No data	
Maryland-1 (Note: Two Jefferson electors ran in this district)	68	5.75	1,114	94.25	No candidate		-1,046	-88.50	1,182	
Maryland-2 (Note: Eight votes were cast for electors pledged to both Jefferson and Adams; one vote was cast for an elector of unknown affiliation.)	789	31.98	1,669	67.65	9	0.37	-880	-35.67	2,467	
Maryland-3	1,724	45.27	2,084	54.73	No candidate		-360	-9.46	3,808	
Maryland-4	1,351	50.17	1,342	49.83	No candidate		9	0.34	2,693	
Maryland-5	2,379	75.45	774	24.55	No candidate		1,605	50.90	3,153	
Maryland-6	1,640	87.00	245	13.00	No candidate		1,395	74.00	1,885	
Maryland-7	1,031	58.15	742	41.85	No candidate		289	16.32	1,773	
Maryland-8	1,022	67.55	491	32.45	No candidate		531	35.10	1,513	
Maryland-9	629	44.61	781	55.39	No candidate		-152	-10.78	1,410	
Maryland-10 (Note: One vote was cast for an elector of unknown affiliation.)	5	0.60	826	99.28	1	0.12	-822	-98.8	832	
North Carolina-Edenton	No data	100	No candidate		No candidate		No data	100	No data	
North Carolina-Edgecombe	1,035	44.02	1,316	55.98	No candidate		-281	-11.96	2,351	
North Carolina-Fayetteville	299	12.32	2,128	87.68	No candidate		-1,829	-75.36	2,427	
North Carolina-Hilsborough	1,344	63.61	769	36.39	No candidate		575	27.22	2,113	
North Carolina-Morgan	1,374	73.95	484	26.05	No candidate		890	47.90	1,858	
North Carolina-New Bern	1,134	54.89	932	45.11	No candidate		202	9.78	2,066	
North Carolina-Northampton	715	50.49	701	49.51	No candidate		14	0.98	1,416	
North Carolina-Raleigh	1,319	63.87	746	36.13	No candidate		573	27.74	2,065	
North Carolina-Rockingham	1,322	53.63	1,143	46.37	No candidate		179	7.26	2,465	
North Carolina-Salisbury	1,010	43.11	1,333	56.89	No candidate		-323	-13.78	2,343	
North Carolina-Warren	1,340	79.86	338	20.14	No candidate		1,002	59.72	1,678	
North Carolina-Wilmington	701	38.18	1,135	61.82	No candidate		-434	-23.64	1,836	
Tennessee-Hamilton (Note: An elector candidate of unknown affiliation ran in this district)	No data		No candidate		No data		No data		No data	
Tennessee-Mero (Note: The Jefferson elector in this district ran unopposed)	No data	100	No candidate		No candidate		No data	100	No data	
Tennessee-Washington	No data		No data		No candidate		No data		No data	

=== States that flipped from Federalist to Democratic-Republican ===
- Maryland
- New York

=== Close states and districts ===
States and districts where the margin of victory was under 1%:

1. Maryland's 4th electoral district, 0.34% (9 votes)
2. North Carolina's Northampton electoral district, 0.98% (14 votes)

States and districts where the margin of victory was under 5%:

1. Rhode Island, 4.06% (194 votes)

States and districts where the margin of victory was under 10%:

1. North Carolina's Rockingham electoral district, 7.26% (179 votes)
2. Maryland's 3rd electoral district, 9.46% (360 votes)
3. North Carolina's New Bern electoral district, 9.78% (202 votes)

== 1801 contingent election ==
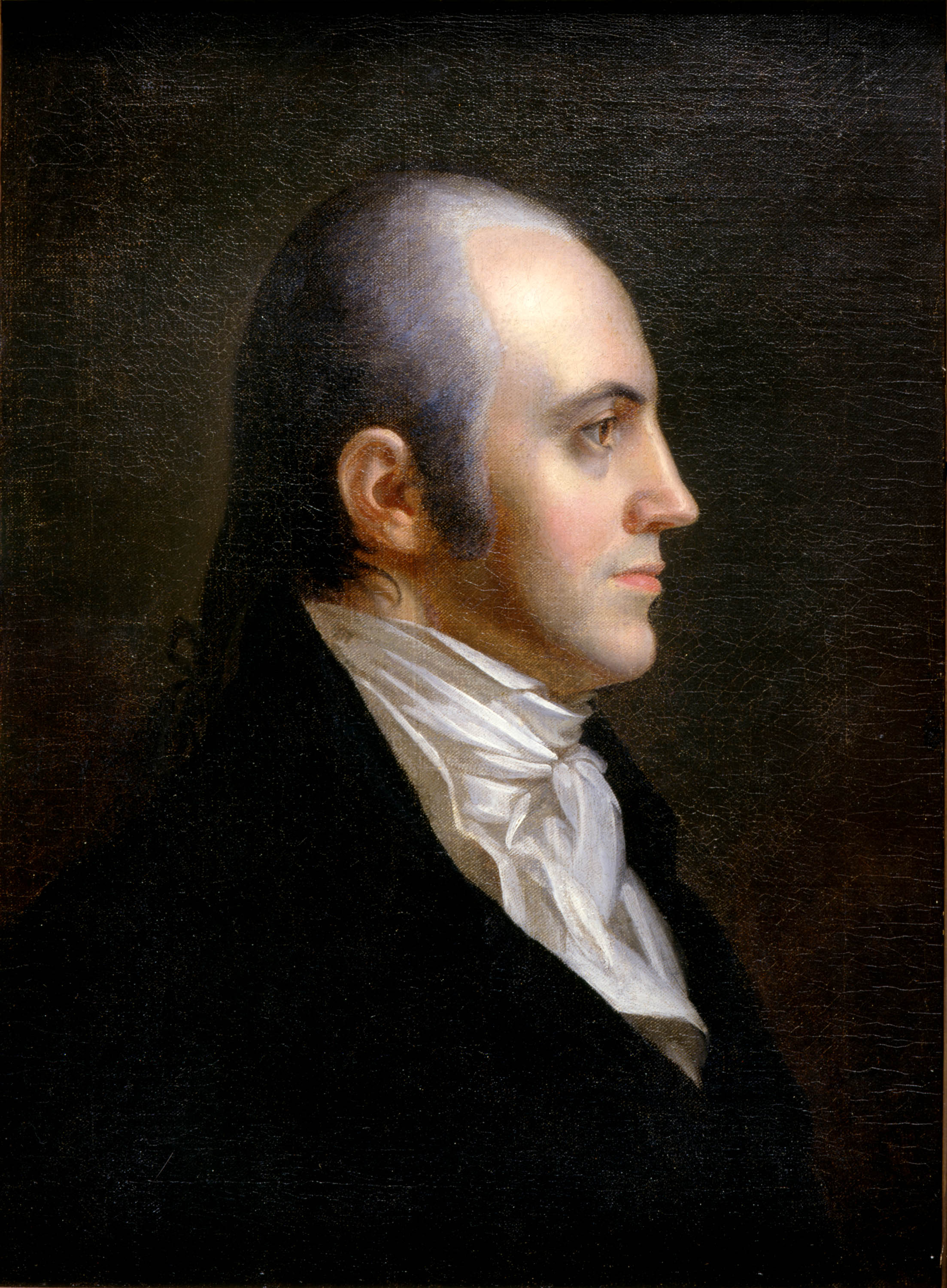
Aaron Burr tied Jefferson in the Electoral College vote.

In February 1801, the members of the House of Representatives balloted as states to determine whether Jefferson or Burr would become president. There were sixteen states, each with one vote; an absolute majority of nine was required for victory. It was the outgoing House of Representatives, controlled by the Federalist Party, that was charged with electing the new president. Jefferson was the great enemy of the Federalists, and a faction of Federalist representatives tried to block him and elect Burr. Most Federalists voted for Burr, giving Burr six of the eight states controlled by Federalists. The seven delegations controlled by Democratic-Republicans all voted for Jefferson, and Georgia's sole Federalist representative also voted for him, giving him eight states. The Vermont delegation was evenly split and cast a blank ballot. The remaining state, Maryland, had five Federalist representatives to three Democratic-Republicans; one of its Federalist representatives voted for Jefferson, forcing that state delegation also to cast a blank ballot.

Publicly, Burr remained quiet between mid-December 1800 and mid-February 1801, when the electoral votes were counted. Behind the scenes, he faced mounting pressure from within the party to step aside if he and Jefferson should tie in electoral votes. However, there was confusion as to whether or not Burr could simply concede the presidency to Jefferson and become vice-president, or whether he would have been forced to withdraw entirely and allow one of the Federalist candidates to become vice-president, as the Constitution was unclear on the matter. Regardless, he refused to disavow the presidency, writing in December 1800 to Representative Samuel Smith (R-MD) that he would not "engage to resign" if chosen president, adding that the question was "unnecessary, unreasonable and impertinent". Rumors circulated that Representative James A. Bayard (F-DE) had—purportedly in Burr's name—approached Smith and Edward Livingston (R-NY) with offers of political appointments if they voted for Burr.

True or not, House Democratic-Republicans, who from the start of the 1800 campaign viewed Jefferson as their candidate for president and Burr for vice president, faced two abhorrent possible outcomes when the House met to vote: the Federalists could engineer a victory for Burr; or the Federalists could refuse to break the deadlock, leaving Federalist Secretary of State John Marshall as Acting President. Neither came to pass, however, chiefly due to Hamilton's energetic opposition to Burr. Hamilton embarked on a frenzied letter-writing campaign to get Federalist Representatives to support Jefferson because he was "by far not so dangerous a man" as Burr; in short, he would much rather have someone with wrong principles than someone devoid of any.

From February 11 to 17, the House cast a total of 35 ballots; each time eight state delegations voted for Jefferson, one short of the necessary majority of nine.

On February 17, on the 36th ballot, Bayard changed his vote from Burr to no selection, joined by his allies in Maryland and Vermont. This changed the Maryland and Vermont votes from no selection to Jefferson, giving him the votes of 10 states and the presidency. The four representatives present from South Carolina, all Federalists, also changed their 3–1 selection of Burr to four abstentions.

Due to the experiences of this and the previous election, sentiment for a new way of selecting the president and vice president rose significantly, resulting in the Twelfth Amendment.

=== Results ===
1801 Contingent United States presidential election
February 11–17, 1801 – 1st through 35th ballots
Candidate	Votes	%
Thomas Jefferson	8	50.00
Aaron Burr	6	37.5
Divided	2	12.5
Total votes:	16	100
Votes necessary:	9	>50
February 17, 1801 – 36th ballot
Candidate	Votes	%
Thomas Jefferson	10	62.5
Aaron Burr	4	25.0
Blank	2	12.5
Total votes:	16	100
Votes necessary:	9	>50
State delegation votes for: Jefferson Burr Blank: Delegation / 1st ballot / 2nd–35th ballots^{(a)} / 36th ballot; Georgia^{(b)} / Jefferson 1 0 / Jefferson 1 0 / Jefferson 1 0; Kentucky / Jefferson 2 0 / Jefferson 2 0 / Jefferson 2 0; New Jersey / Jefferson 3 2 / Jefferson 3 2 / Jefferson 3 2; New York / Jefferson 6 4 / Jefferson 6 4 / Jefferson 6 4; North Carolina / Jefferson 9 1 / Jefferson 6 4 / Jefferson 6 4; Pennsylvania / Jefferson 9 4 / Jefferson 9 4 / Jefferson 9 4; Tennessee / Jefferson 1 0 / Jefferson 1 0 / Jefferson 1 0; Virginia / Jefferson 16 3 / Jefferson 14 5 / Jefferson 14 5; Maryland / Divided 4 4 / Divided 4 4 / Jefferson 4 0 4; Vermont / Divided 1 1 / Divided 1 1 / Jefferson 1 0 1; Delaware / Burr 0 1 / Burr 0 1 / Blank 0 0 1; South Carolina^{(c)} / Burr 0 5 / Burr 1 3 / Blank 0 0 4; Connecticut / Burr 0 7 / Burr 0 7 / Burr 0 7; Massachusetts / Burr 3 11 / Burr 3 11 / Burr 3 11; New Hampshire / Burr 0 4 / Burr 0 4 / Burr 0 4; Rhode Island / Burr 0 2 / Burr 0 2 / Burr 0 2; Sources:

^{(a)} The votes of the representatives is typical and may have fluctuated from ballot to ballot, but the result for each state did not change.
^{(b)} Even though Georgia had two representatives apportioned, one seat was vacant due to the death of James Jones.
^{(c)} Even though South Carolina had six representatives apportioned, Thomas Sumter was absent due to illness, and Abraham Nott departed for South Carolina between the first and final ballots.

== Electoral College selection ==
The Constitution, in Article II, Section 1, provided that the state legislatures should decide the manner in which their electors were chosen. Different state legislatures chose different methods:

Method of choosing electors	State(s)
State is divided into electoral districts, with one Elector chosen per district by the voters of that district	Maryland; North Carolina
State is divided into two electoral districts and half the electors are chosen from each district.	Kentucky
Each Elector chosen by voters statewide	Rhode Island; Virginia
Divided the state into three electoral districts and named three persons from each county in each district to elect an elector for each of the three districts (same as in 1796)	Tennessee
Each Elector appointed by state legislature	(all other states)

== In popular culture ==
In the 2015 musical Hamilton by Lin Manuel Miranda, the contest between Jefferson and Burr is recounted in "The Election of 1800". The song focuses on Alexander Hamilton's role in deciding the outcome of the 1801 contingent election. The musical simplifies the complicated multiple elections somewhat, portraying Adams's unpopularity as making the real choice between Jefferson and Burr. Historians wrote that Adams did not lose that badly in the original election, with the musical inflating the size of Jefferson's victory. It implies Hamilton's support for Jefferson over Burr was the catalyst for the Burr–Hamilton duel; in fact, while that helped sour relations between Burr and Hamilton, the duel was ultimately provoked by Hamilton's statements about Burr in the 1804 New York gubernatorial election.

== See also ==
- First inauguration of Thomas Jefferson
- Bibliography of Thomas Jefferson
- 1800–01 United States House of Representatives elections
- 1800–01 United States Senate elections
- History of the United States (1789–1849)
- Stephen Simpson (editor of the Aurora, a Philadelphia newspaper Jefferson credited for his victory in 1800)
- Burr dilemma

== Bibliography ==
- "Election of 1800" in Arthur M. Schlesinger Jr. ed. Coming to Power: Critical Presidential Elections in American History (1972) pp. 33–66. online
- Ben-Atar, Doron; Oberg, Barbara B., eds. (1999), Federalists Reconsidered, University of Virginia Press, ISBN 978-0-8139-1863-1
- Beard, Charles A. (1915), The Economic Origins of Jeffersonian Democracy, ISBN 978-1-146-80267-3
- Bowling, Kenneth R.; Kennon, Donald R. (2005), Establishing Congress: The Removal to Washington, D.C., and the Election of 1800, Ohio University Press, ISBN 978-0-8214-1619-8
- Buel, Richard (1972), Securing the Revolution: Ideology in American Politics, 1789–1815
- Chambers, William Nisbet (1963), Political Parties in a New Nation: The American Experience, 1776–1809
- Chernow, Ron (2005), Alexander Hamilton, Penguin, ISBN 978-0-14-303475-9
- Cunningham, Noble E. Jr. (1965), The Making of the American Party System 1789 to 1809
- Der Linden, Frank Van. (2000) The Turning Point: Jefferson's Battle for the Presidency. (Washington D.C.: Robert B. Luce).
- Dunn, Susan (2004), Jefferson's second revolution: The Election Crisis of 1800 and the Triumph of Republicanism, Houghton Mifflin Harcourt, ISBN 978-0-618-13164-8
- Elkins, Stanley; McKitrick, Eric (1995), The Age of Federalism
- Ferling, John (2004). Adams vs. Jefferson: The Tumultuous Election of 1800. New York, NY: Oxford University Press. ISBN 978-0-19-516771-9.
- Fischer, David Hackett (1965), The Revolution of American Conservatism: The Federalist Party in the Era of Jeffersonian Democracy
- Freeman, Joanne B. (2001), Affairs of Honor: National Politics in the New Republic
- Freeman, Joanne B. (1999), "The election of 1800: a study in the logic of political change", Yale Law Journal, 108 (8): 1959–1994, doi:10.2307/797378, JSTOR 797378
- Goodman, Paul (1967), "The First American Party System", in Chambers, William Nisbet; Burnham, Walter Dean (eds.), The American Party Systems: Stages of Political Development, pp. 56–89
- Hofstadter, Richard (1970), The Idea of a Party System
- Horn, James P. P.; Lewis, Jan Ellen; Onuf, Peter S. (2002), The Revolution of 1800: Democracy, Race, and the New Republic
- Laracey, Mel. “The Presidential Newspaper as an Engine of Early American Political Development: The Case of Thomas Jefferson and the Election of 1800.” Rhetoric and Public Affairs, vol. 11, no. 1, 2008, pp. 7–46. online
- Lepore, Jill (2018). These truths: a history of the United States (1st ed.). New York (N. Y.): W.W. Norton & Company. ISBN 978-0-393-63524-9
- McCullough, David (2001), John Adams
- Miller, John C. (1959), Alexander Hamilton: Portrait in Paradox
- Pasley, Jeffrey L. “The Devolution of 1800: Jefferson's Election and the Birth of American Government.” in America at the Ballot Box: Elections and Political History, edited by Gareth Davies and Julian E. Zelizer, University of Pennsylvania Press, 2015, pp. 13–35. online
- Pasley, Jeffrey L.; et al., eds. (2004), Beyond the Founders: New Approaches to the Political History of the Early American Republic, University of North Carolina Press, ISBN 978-0-8078-5558-4
- Rose, Lisle A. “‘The Violent Spirit of Party’: The Election of 1800.” in Prologue to Democracy: The Federalists in the South 1789--1800, (University Press of Kentucky, 1968), pp. 232–82. online
- Schachner, Nathan (1961), Aaron Burr: A Biography
- Sharp, James Roger. “The Election of 1800.” in American Politics in the Early Republic: The New Nation in Crisis (Yale University Press, 1993), pp. 226–49. online
- Sharp, James Roger. The Deadlocked Election of 1800: Jefferson, Burr, and the Union in the Balance (University Press of Kansas; 2010) 239 pages;
- Wills, Garry (2003), "Negro President": Jefferson and the Slave Power, Houghton Mifflin Co., pp. 47–89, ISBN 0-618-34398-9 ... also listed (in at least one source) as from Mariner Books (Boston) in 2004
- Weisberger, Bernard A. (2000) "America Afire: Jefferson, Adams, and the Revolutionary Election of 1800" (New York: William Morrow).

=== Primary sources ===
- Sloan, Herbert. " 'In a Choice of Evils...Jefferson is in Every View Less Dangerous than Burr': Alexander Hamilton to Harrison Gray Otis on the Deadlocked Presidential Election of 1800." OAH Magazine of History 18.5 (2004): 53-57 excerpt
