= 1800 United States presidential election in New Jersey =

- October 31 – December 3, 1800
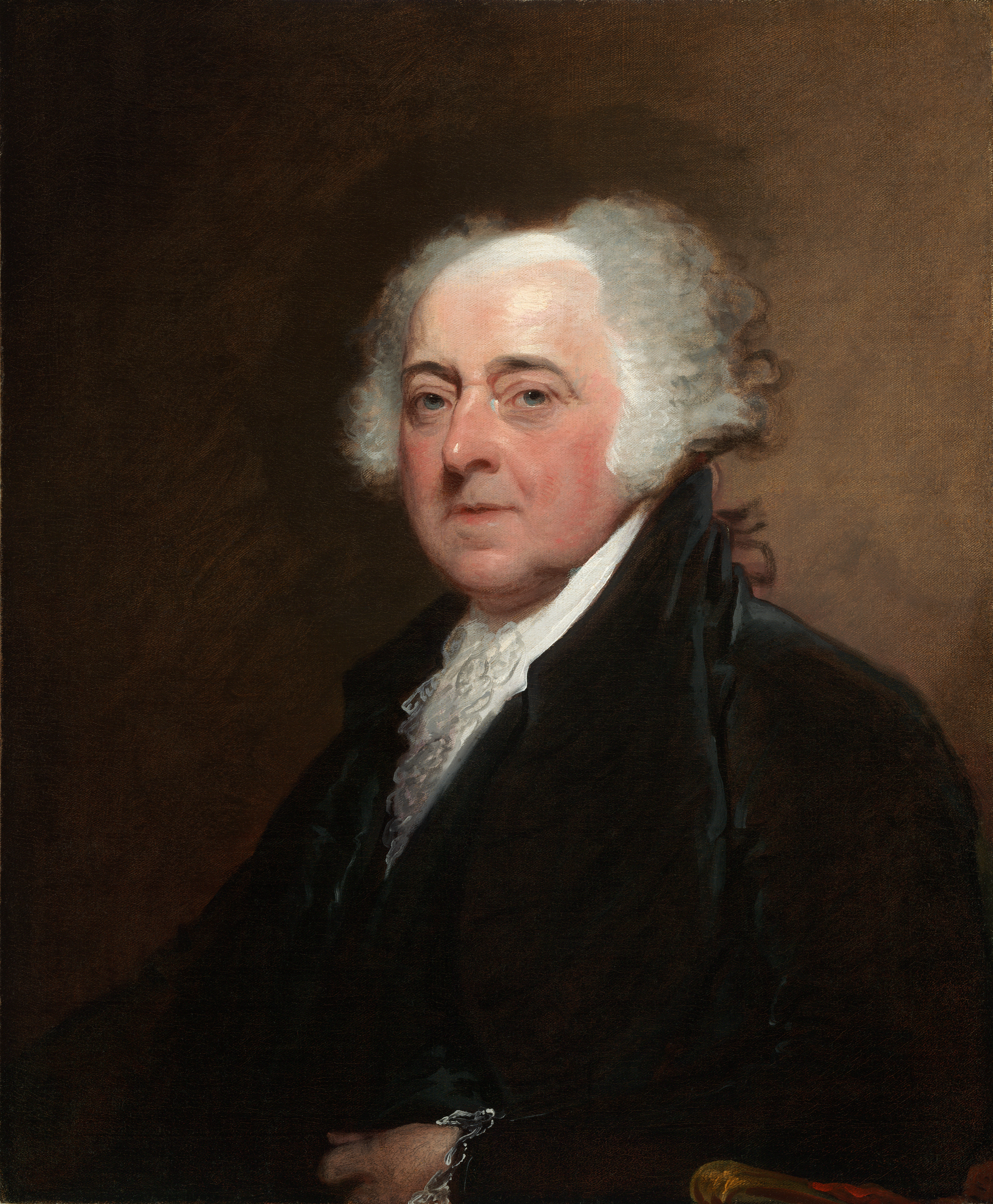

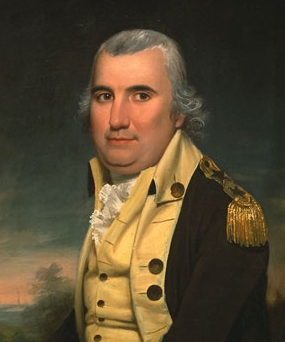
Nominee	John Adams	Charles Cotesworth Pinckney
Party	Federalist	Federalist
Home state	Massachusetts	South Carolina
Electoral vote	7	7
Percentage	100.00%	–
President before election
John Adams
Federalist
Elected President
Thomas Jefferson
Democratic-Republican

A presidential election was held in New Jersey between October 31 and December 3, 1800, as part of the 1800 United States presidential election. The state legislature chose seven representatives, or electors to the Electoral College, who voted for President and Vice President.

During this election, New Jersey cast seven electoral votes for incumbent Federalist President John Adams. However, Adams would lose to Democratic-Republican Party candidate Thomas Jefferson nationally.

== See also ==
- United States presidential elections in New Jersey
