= 1800 United States presidential election in Georgia =

- October 31 – December 3, 1800
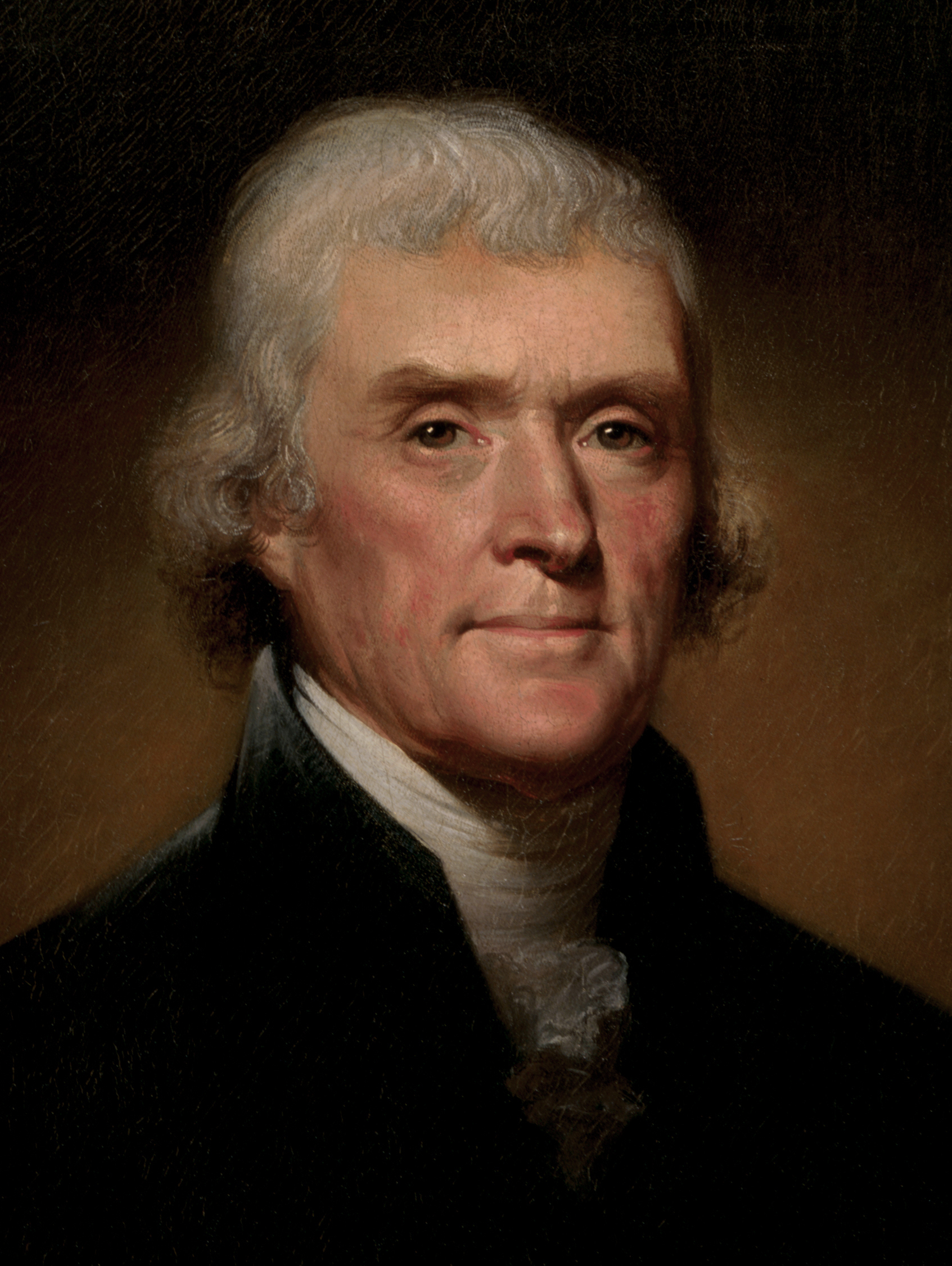

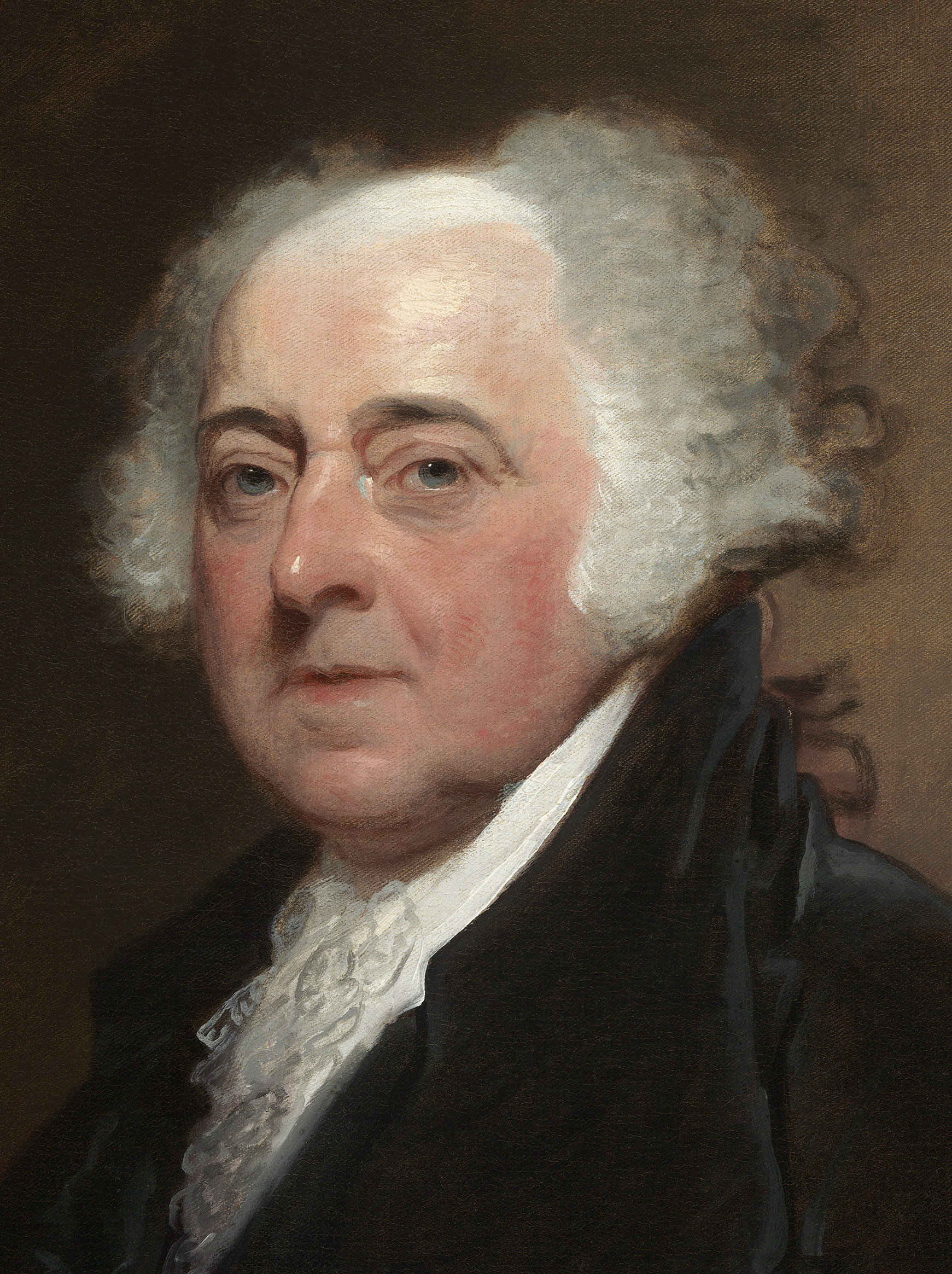
Nominee	Thomas Jefferson	John Adams
Party	Democratic-Republican	Federalist
Home state	Virginia	Massachusetts
Running mate	Aaron Burr	Charles Cotesworth Pinckney
Electoral vote	4	0
Percentage	100.00%	-

A presidential election was held in Georgia between October 31 and December 3, 1800, as part of the 1800 United States presidential election. The state legislature chose four representatives, or electors to the Electoral College, who voted for President and Vice President.

Georgia cast four electoral votes for the Democratic-Republican candidate and incumbent Vice President Thomas Jefferson over the Federalist candidate and incumbent President John Adams. The electoral votes for Vice president were cast for Jefferson's running mate Aaron Burr from New York. These electors were elected by the Georgia General Assembly, the state legislature, rather than by popular vote.

== Results ==
1800 United States presidential election in Georgia
Party	Candidate	Votes	Percentage	Electoral votes
Democratic-Republican	Thomas Jefferson	–	100.00%	4
Federalist	John Adams (incumbent)	–	–	0
Totals		–	100.00%	4

== See also ==
- United States presidential elections in Georgia
