= 1800 United States presidential election in Delaware =

- October 31 – December 3, 1800
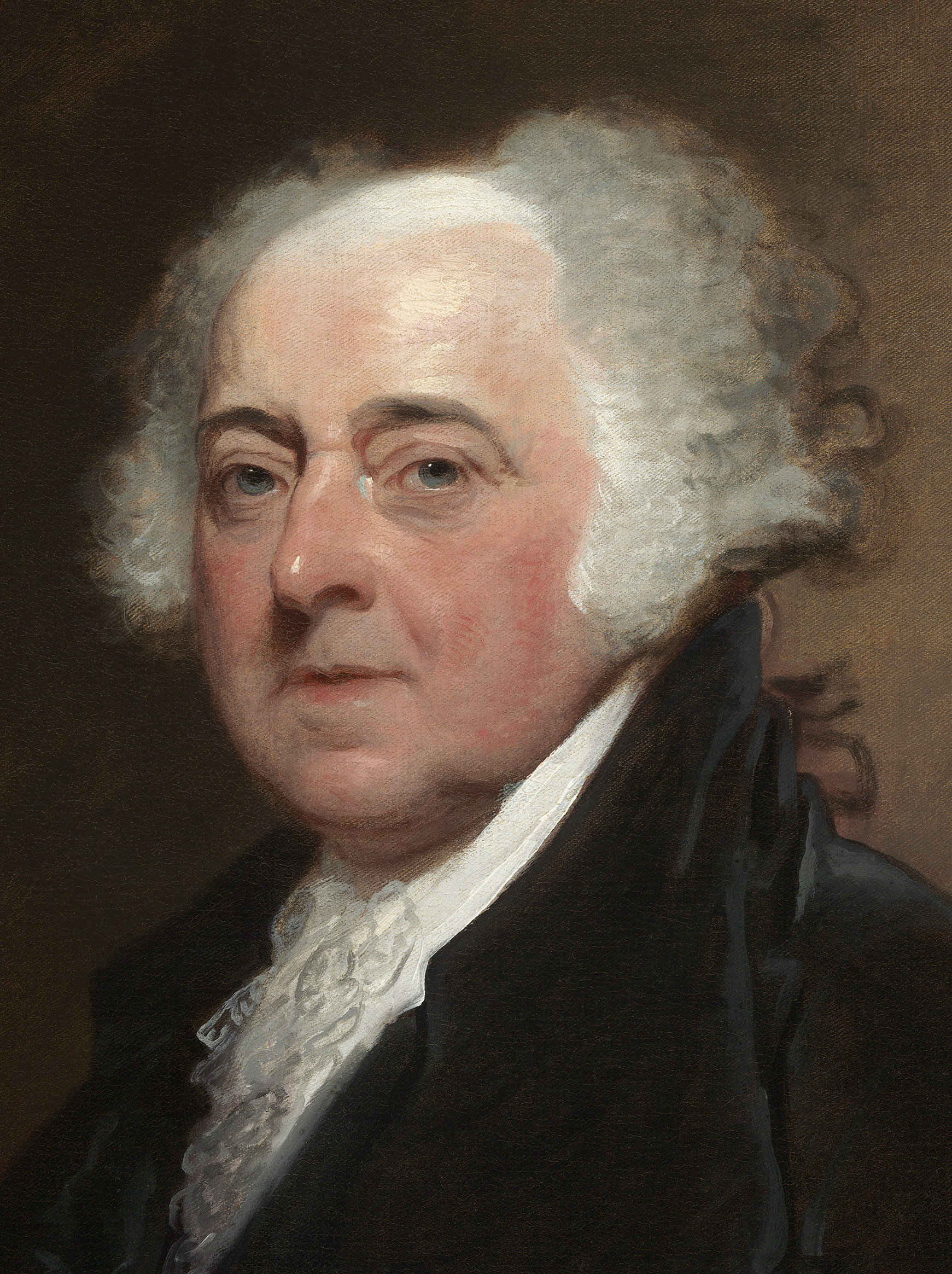

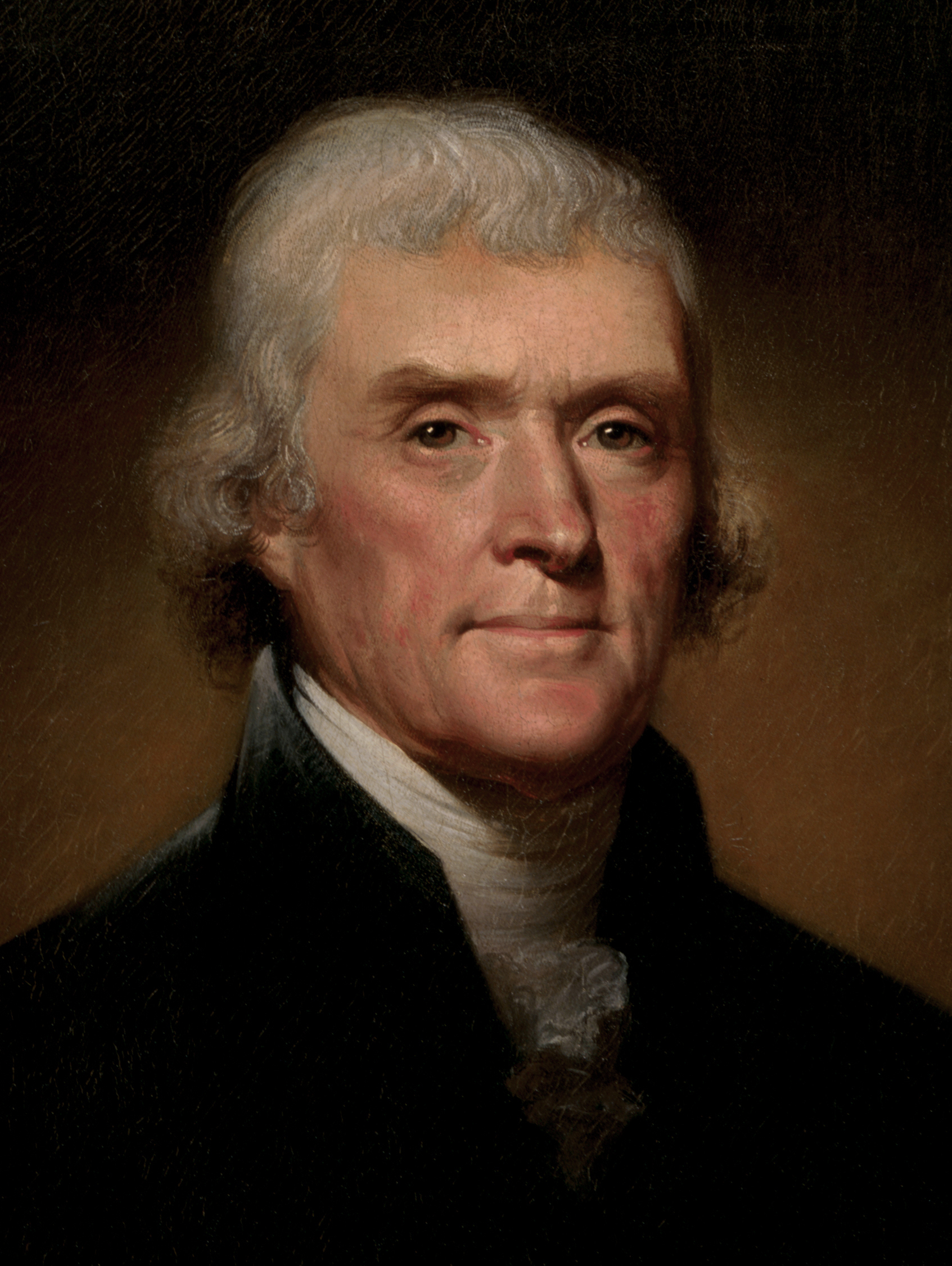
Nominee	John Adams	Thomas Jefferson
Party	Federalist	Democratic-Republican
Home state	Massachusetts	Virginia
Running mate	Charles Cotesworth Pinckney	Aaron Burr
Electoral vote	3	0
Percentage	100.00%	-

A presidential election was held in Delaware between October 31 and December 3, 1800, as part of the 1800 United States presidential election. Voters chose three representatives, or electors to the Electoral College, who voted for President and Vice President.

Delaware cast three electoral votes for the Federalist candidate and incumbent President John Adams over the Democratic-Republican candidate and incumbent Vice President Thomas Jefferson. These electors were elected by the Delaware General Assembly, the state legislature, rather than by popular vote. The three electoral votes for Vice president were cast for Adams's running mate Charles C. Pinckney from South Carolina.

== Results ==
1800 United States presidential election in Delaware
Party	Candidate	Votes	Percentage	Electoral votes
Federalist	John Adams (incumbent)	–	100.00%	3
Democratic-Republican	Thomas Jefferson	–	–	0
Totals		–	100.00%	3

== See also ==
- United States presidential elections in Delaware
