= 1800 United States presidential election in Massachusetts =

- October 31 – December 3, 1800
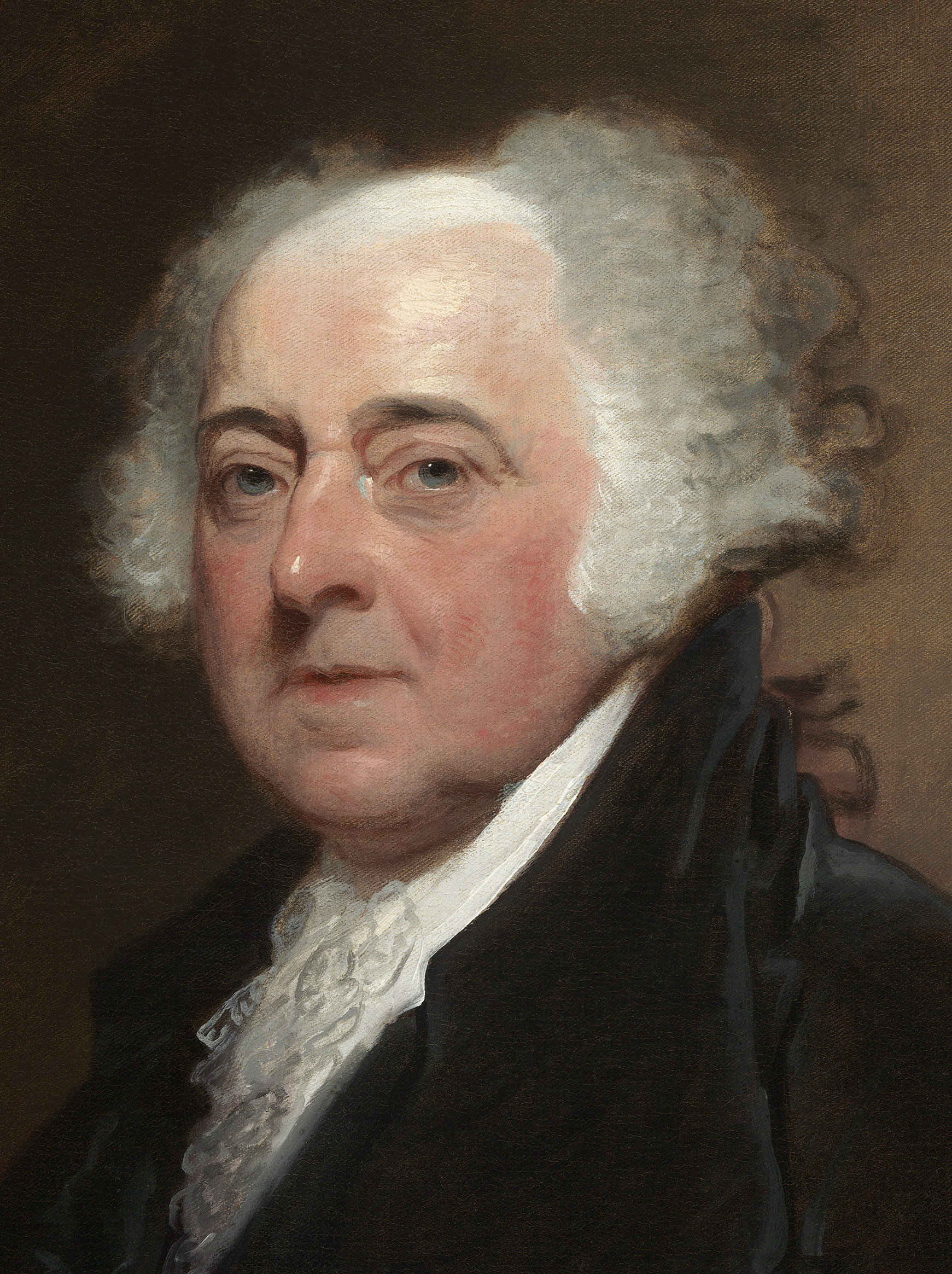

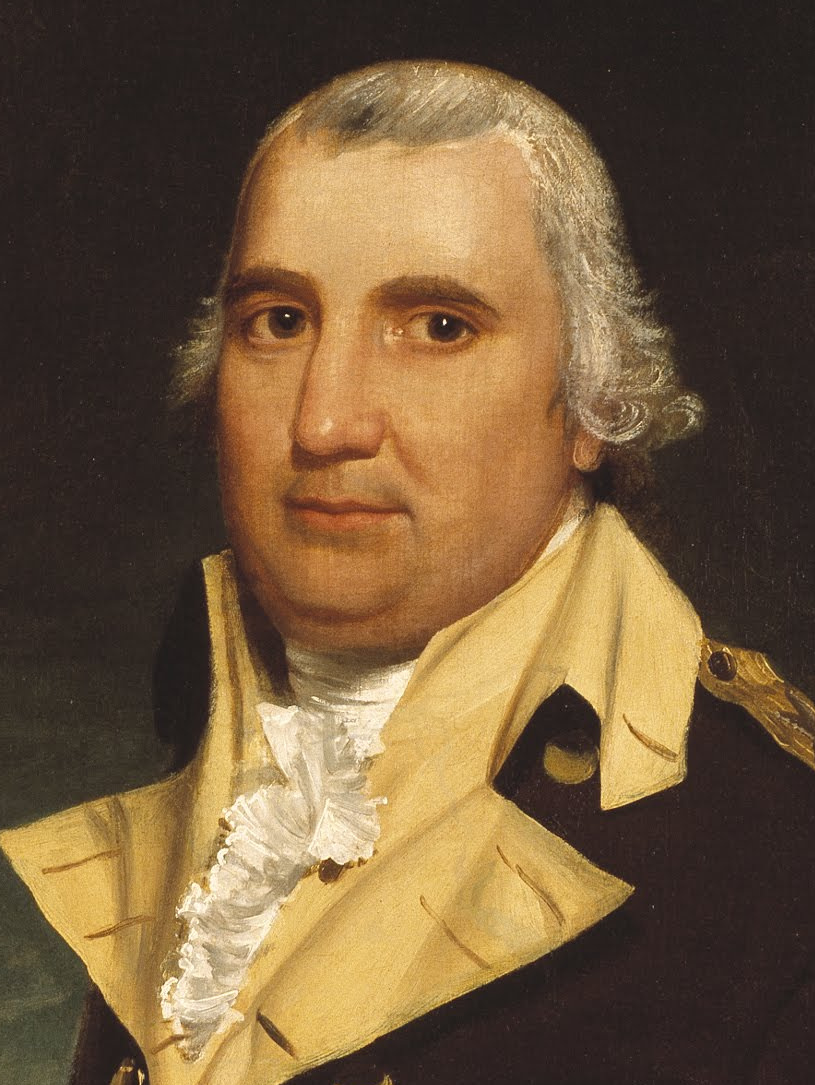
Nominee	John Adams	Charles Cotesworth Pinckney
Party	Federalist	Federalist
Home state	Massachusetts	South Carolina
Electoral vote	16	16
Percentage	100%	–
President before election
John Adams
Federalist
Elected President
Thomas Jefferson
Democratic-Republican

A presidential election was held in the state of Massachusetts between October 31 to December 3, 1800, as part of the 1800 United States presidential election. Voters chose sixteen representatives, or electors to the Electoral College, who voted for president and vice president.

During this election, Federalists John Adams and his running mate Charles Cotesworth Pinckney were the only two candidates on the ballot in Massachusetts. As both represented the Federalist Party there was no popular vote. While Adams won all 16 Massachusetts state electors in his home state, it was not enough to win the general election. The Democratic-Republican Party candidate, Vice President Thomas Jefferson, defeated Adams.

== See also ==
- United States presidential elections in Massachusetts
- Massachusetts's congressional districts
