= List of ADO Den Haag seasons =

This is a list of the seasons played by ADO Den Haag from 1956 when the club entered the Eredivisie, the club was established in 1905, to the most recent seasons. The club's achievements in all major national and international competitions as well as the top scorers are listed. Top scorers in bold and colored background were also top scorers of the Eredivisie.

ADO Den Haag have won the Netherlands Football League Championship two times; both of them before the start of the Eredivisie. The club have also won the KNVB Cup twice.

== Key ==
Key to league record:

- P – Played
- W – Games won
- D – Games drawn
- L – Games lost
- F – Goals for
- A – Goals against
- Pts – Points
- Pos – Final position

Key to colours and symbols:
Symbol	Meaning
**W**	Championship Winners
RU	Cup Runners-up
↑	Promoted
↓	Relegated
EC	European Cup / Champions League
EC	UEFA Cup / Europa League
♦	Top league scorer in Feyenoord's division

Key to rounds:

- Prel. – Preliminary round
- QR1 – First qualifying round
- QR2 – Second qualifying round, etc.
- Inter – Intermediate round (between qualifying rounds and rounds proper)
- GS – Group stage
- 1R – First round
- 2R – Second round, etc.
- R64 – 1/32 Final (round of 64)
- R32 – 1/16 Final (round of 32)
- R16 – 1/8 Final (round of 16)
- QF – Quarter-final
- SF – Semi-final
- F – Final
- W – Winners
- DNE – Did not enter

Key to competitions

- JCS – Johan Cruyff Shield
- EC – European Cup (1955–1992)
- UCL – UEFA Champions League (1992–present)
- CWC – UEFA Cup Winners' Cup (1960–1999)
- UC – UEFA Cup (1971–2009)
- UEL – UEFA Europa League (2009–present)
- USC – UEFA Super Cup
- FCWC – FIFA Club World Cup

== Seasons from 1956 to present ==
Results of league and cup competitions by season
Season	Division	P	W	D	L	F	A	Pts.	Pos.	KNVB Cup	JCS	Cup	Result	Name	Goals
Season	League									KNVB Cup	JCS	UEFA - FIFA		Top goalscorer(s)	
1956–57	Eerste Divisie A	30	20	7	3	89	35	47	**1st** ↑	SF				Carol Schuurman	27
1957–58	Eredivisie	34	14	7	13	68	56	35	6th	3rd round				Carol Schuurman	25
1958–59	Eredivisie	34	9	10	15	63	84	28	13th	RU				Carol Schuurman	19
1959–60	Eredivisie	34	13	5	16	66	68	31	12th	Not held				Lex Rijnvis	17
1960–61	Eredivisie	34	15	2	17	59	78	32	11th	2nd round				Carol Schuurman	18
1961–62	Eredivisie	34	9	11	14	58	69	29	15th	Int. round				Carol Schuurman	22
1962–63	Eredivisie	30	9	10	11	41	36	28	10th	RU				Peter Hoet	10
1963–64	Eredivisie	30	12	6	12	47	60	30	10th	RU				Kees Aarts	15
1964–65	Eredivisie	30	13	7	10	37	32	33	3rd	2nd Round				Kees Aarts	12
1965–66	Eredivisie	30	15	9	6	72	37	39	3rd	RU				Kees Aarts	18
1966–67	Eredivisie	34	18	10	6	70	40	46	4th	2nd Round				Henk Houwaart	14
1967–68	Eredivisie	34	15	11	8	53	34	41	4th	**W**				Lex Schoenmaker	12
1968–69	Eredivisie	34	12	13	9	45	37	37	6th	1/8 Final	CWC	1/8 Final		Lex Schoenmaker	19
1969–70	Eredivisie	34	14	12	8	56	33	40	6th	1/4 Final				Harald Berg	17
1970–71	Eredivisie	34	21	8	5	62	27	50	3rd	1/4 Final				Lex Schoenmaker	15
1971–72	Eredivisie	34	17	10	7	59	33	44	5th	RU	UC	1/16 Final		Sjaak Roggeveen	13
1972–73	Eredivisie	34	15	10	9	44	39	40	5th	1/4 Final	CWC	1st Round		Harald Berg	10
1973–74	Eredivisie	34	8	10	16	29	53	26	13th	2nd round				Keest Storm	6
1974–75	Eredivisie	34	7	16	11	33	42	30	10th	**W**				Henk van Leeuwen	10
1975–76	Eredivisie	34	15	7	12	65	51	37	6th	1/8 Final	CWC	1/4 Final		Henk van Leeuwen	16
1976–77	Eredivisie	34	10	12	12	50	42	32	10th	1/2 Final				Henk van Leeuwen	10
1977–78	Eredivisie	34	11	6	17	45	57	28	12th	2nd Round				Henk van Leeuwen	15
1978–79	Eredivisie	34	11	11	12	43	55	33	7th	1/8 Final				Roger Albertsen	6
1979–80	Eredivisie	34	11	9	14	38	43	31	10th	1/4 Final				Lex Schoenmaker	9
1980–81	Eredivisie	34	12	3	19	53	79	27	14th	2nd Round				Harry Melis	15
1981–82	Eredivisie	34	4	5	25	29	82	13	17th ↓	2nd Round				Bram Rontberg	6
1982–83	Eerste Divisie	30	11	10	9	60	44	32	6th	1/8 Final				Bram Rontberg	23
1983–84	Eerste Divisie	32	15	5	12	49	39	35	7th	1/8 Final				John Linford	20
1984–85	Eerste Divisie	34	16	13	5	62	40	45	4th	2nd Round				Huub Smeets	18
1985–86	Eerste Divisie	36	26	10	0	85	33	62	**1st** ↑	1/2 Final				Remco Boere	28
1986–87	Eredivisie	34	8	12	14	46	64	28	14th	RU				Tony Morley	12
1987–88	Eredivisie	34	7	8	19	50	72	22	17th ↓	1/8 Final	CWC	1/8 Final		Remco Boere	18
1988–89	Eerste Divisie	36	23	7	6	85	35	53	2nd ↑	1/2 Final				Heini Otto	17
1989–90	Eredivisie	34	13	7	14	58	63	33	10th	2nd Round				Harry van der Laan	21
1990–91	Eredivisie	34	10	8	16	40	60	28	14th	1/8 Final				Marcel Valk	6
1991–92	Eredivisie	34	6	10	18	35	63	22	16th ↓	3rd Round				Harry van der Laan	12
1992–93	Eerste Divisie	34	15	8	11	65	61	38	8th	3rd Round				Harry van der Laan	15
1993–94	Eerste Divisie	34	14	10	10	62	56	38	7th	1/4 Final				Harry van der Laan	24
1994–95	Eerste Divisie	34	16	8	10	71	52	40	4th	1/8 Final				Harry van der Laan	18
1995–96	Eerste Divisie	34	8	7	19	39	60	31	15th	1/8 Final				Gavin Price	11
1996–97	Eerste Divisie	34	14	10	10	48	48	41	8th	GS				Gavin Price	6
1997–98	Eerste Divisie	34	17	7	10	69	43	58	5th	1st Round				Dennis Iliohan	16
1998–99	Eerste Divisie	34	12	9	13	52	52	45	10th	1st Round				Edgar van der Roer	11
1999–2000	Eerste Divisie	34	12	6	16	37	52	42	11th	2nd Round				Rene Lievaart	7
2000–01	Eerste Divisie	34	9	9	16	51	71	36	16th	1st Round				Ali Boussaboun	14
2001–02	Eerste Divisie	34	18	9	7	53	36	63	4th	1st Round				Emiel van Eijkeren	16
2002–03	Eerste Divisie	34	26	5	3	74	20	83	**1st** ↑	1/8 Final				Roy Stroeve	16
2003–04	Eredivisie	34	9	7	18	36	61	34	15th	2nd Round				Roy Stroeve	10
2004–05	Eredivisie	34	10	6	18	44	59	36	14th	1/4 Final				Geert den Ouden	12
2005–06	Eredivisie	34	10	5	19	36	62	35	15th	3rd Round				Joonas Kolkka	8
2006–07	Eredivisie	34	3	8	23	40	72	17	18th ↓	3rd Round				Santi Kolk	11
2007–08	Eerste Divisie	34	16	10	12	58	50	58	6th ↑	3rd Round				Hans van de Haar	12
2008–09	Eredivisie	34	8	8	18	41	58	32	14th	1/8 Final				Richard Knopper	10
2009–10	Eredivisie	34	7	9	18	38	59	30	15th	2nd Round				Wesley Verhoek	7
2010–11	Eredivisie	34	16	6	12	63	55	54	7th	1/16 Final				Dmitri Bulykin	21
2011–12	Eredivisie	34	8	8	18	38	67	32	15th	3rd Round	EL	3rd Qual.		Lex Immers	8
2012–13	Eredivisie	34	9	13	12	49	63	40	9th	3rd Round				Danny Holla; Mike van Duinen	11
2013–14	Eredivisie	34	12	7	15	45	64	43	9th	3rd Round				Mike van Duinen	8
2014–15	Eredivisie	34	9	10	15	44	53	37	13th	2nd Round				Michiel Kramer	17
2015–16	Eredivisie	34	10	13	11	48	49	43	11th	2nd Round				Mike Havenaar	16
2016–17	Eredivisie	34	11	5	18	37	59	38	11th	1/8 Final				Mike Havenaar	9
2017–18	Eredivisie	34	13	8	13	45	53	47	7th	1st Round				Bjørn Johnsen	19
2018–19	Eredivisie	34	12	9	13	58	63	45	9th	2nd Round				Abdenasser El Khayati	17
2019–20	Eredivisie	26	4	7	15	25	54	19	17th (Note: The 2019–20 Eredivisie season was ended early due to the coronavirus pandemic, with no title winners or relegation. As a result, ADO Den Haag concluded the league season in 17th place, but were not relegated.)	1st Round				Tomáš Necid	6
2020–21	Eredivisie	34	4	10	20	29	76	22	18th ↓	2nd Round				Michiel Kramer	6
2021-22	Eerste Divisie	38	22	7	9	76	53	67	4th	1/8 Final				Thomas Verheydt	34
2022-23	Eerste Divisie	38	13	12	13	51	57	51	12th	1/4 Final				Thomas Verheydt	15
2023-24	Eerste Divisie	38	17	12	9	72	50	63	5th	1/4 Final				Henk Veerman	23
2024-25	Eerste Divisie	38	20	10	8	69	47	70	4th	1st Round				Lee Bonis	11
