= Politics of North Carolina =

Overview of the politics of the U.S. state of North Carolina

United States presidential election results for North Carolina
Year	Republican / Whig		Democratic		Third party(ies)	
Year	No.	%	No.	%	No.	%
1836	23,521	46.90%	26,631	53.10%	1	0.00%
1840	46,567	57.68%	34,168	42.32%	0	0.00%
1844	43,232	52.39%	39,287	47.61%	2	0.00%
1848	44,054	55.17%	35,772	44.80%	26	0.03%
1852	39,043	49.49%	39,788	50.43%	60	0.08%
1856	0	0.00%	48,243	56.78%	36,720	43.22%
1860	0	0.00%	2,737	2.83%	93,975	97.17%
1868	96,939	53.41%	84,559	46.59%	0	0.00%
1872	94,772	57.38%	70,130	42.46%	261	0.16%
1876	108,484	46.38%	125,427	53.62%	0	0.00%
1880	115,616	47.98%	124,204	51.55%	1,126	0.47%
1884	125,021	46.59%	142,905	53.25%	430	0.16%
1888	134,784	47.20%	147,902	51.79%	2,877	1.01%
1892	100,346	35.80%	132,951	47.44%	46,973	16.76%
1896	155,122	46.82%	174,408	52.64%	1,807	0.55%
1900	132,997	45.47%	157,733	53.92%	1,788	0.61%
1904	82,442	39.67%	124,091	59.71%	1,285	0.62%
1908	114,887	45.49%	136,928	54.22%	739	0.29%
1912	29,139	11.95%	144,507	59.24%	70,272	28.81%
1916	120,890	41.71%	168,383	58.10%	562	0.19%
1920	232,848	43.22%	305,447	56.69%	463	0.09%
1924	191,753	39.73%	284,270	58.89%	6,664	1.38%
1928	348,923	54.94%	286,227	45.06%	0	0.00%
1932	208,344	29.28%	497,566	69.93%	5,591	0.79%
1936	223,283	26.60%	616,141	73.40%	40	0.00%
1940	213,633	25.97%	609,015	74.03%	0	0.00%
1944	263,155	33.29%	527,399	66.71%	0	0.00%
1948	258,572	32.68%	459,070	58.02%	73,567	9.30%
1952	558,107	46.09%	652,803	53.91%	0	0.00%
1956	575,062	49.34%	590,530	50.66%	0	0.00%
1960	655,420	47.89%	713,136	52.11%	0	0.00%
1964	624,844	43.85%	800,139	56.15%	0	0.00%
1968	627,192	39.51%	464,113	29.24%	496,188	31.26%
1972	1,054,889	69.46%	438,705	28.89%	25,018	1.65%
1976	741,960	44.22%	927,365	55.27%	8,581	0.51%
1980	915,018	49.30%	875,635	47.18%	65,180	3.51%
1984	1,346,481	61.90%	824,287	37.89%	4,593	0.21%
1988	1,237,258	57.97%	890,167	41.71%	6,945	0.33%
1992	1,134,661	43.44%	1,114,042	42.65%	363,147	13.90%
1996	1,225,938	48.73%	1,107,849	44.04%	182,020	7.24%
2000	1,631,163	56.03%	1,257,692	43.20%	22,407	0.77%
2004	1,961,166	56.02%	1,525,849	43.58%	13,992	0.40%
2008	2,128,474	49.38%	2,142,651	49.70%	39,664	0.92%
2012	2,270,395	50.39%	2,178,391	48.35%	56,586	1.26%
2016	2,362,631	49.83%	2,189,316	46.17%	189,617	4.00%
2020	2,758,775	49.93%	2,684,292	48.59%	81,737	1.48%
2024	2,898,423	50.86%	2,715,375	47.65%	85,343	1.50%

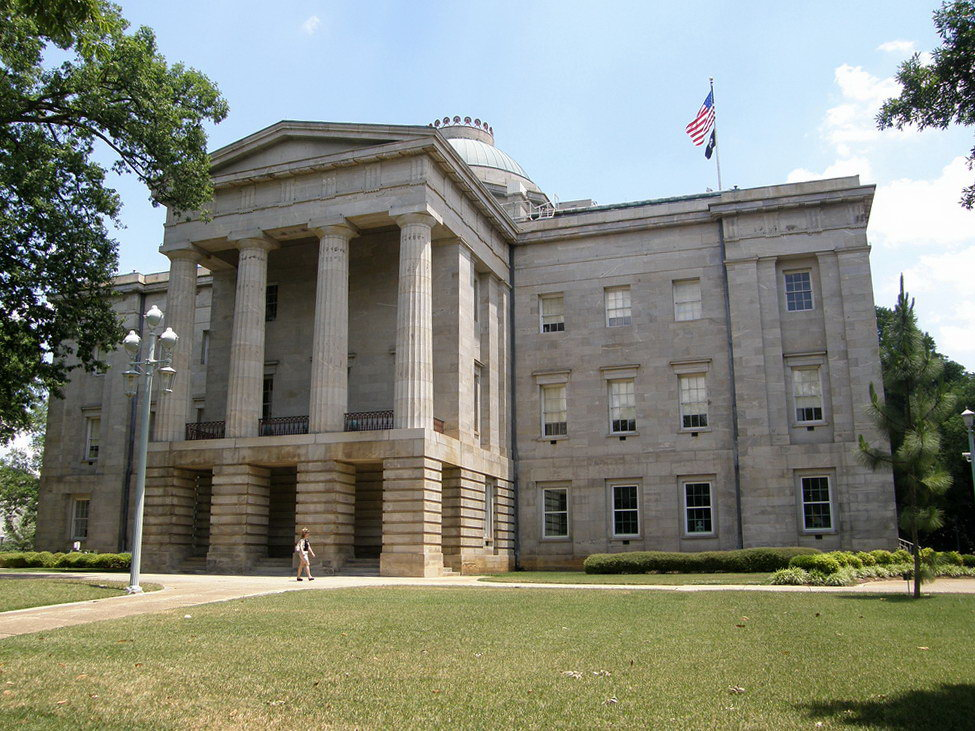
North Carolina State Capitol

Like most U.S. states, North Carolina is politically dominated by the Democratic and Republican political parties, though the Republican Party holds an edge. North Carolina has 14 seats in the U.S. House of Representatives and two seats in the U.S. Senate. North Carolina has voted for the Republican candidate in all but one presidential election since 1980; the one exception was in 2008, when a plurality of North Carolinians voted for Barack Obama. However, since that election, the state has remained closely contested with Republicans winning by no more than four points and obtaining a majority of the vote only in 2012 and 2024. This stands in contrast to the post-Civil War era, as the state was a strongly Democratic Solid South state from 1880 to 1964, only voting Republican in 1928.

However, North Carolina has mostly elected Democratic governors in its history; only four Republican governors have been elected since Reconstruction, and of those only one, James G. Martin, served two terms.

== History ==
=== Pre-Civil War ===
Historically, North Carolina was politically divided between the eastern and western parts of the state. Before the Civil War, the eastern half of North Carolina supported the Democratic Party, primarily because the region contained most of the state's planter slaveholders who profited from large cash crops. Yeomen farmers in the western Piedmont and mountains were not slaveholders and tended to support the Whig party, seen as more moderate on slavery and more supportive of business interests.

=== Post-Civil War ===
After the Civil War, Republicans, including newly enfranchised freedmen, controlled the state government during Reconstruction. When federal troops were removed in the national compromise of 1877, the Democratic Party gained control of the state government, partly through white paramilitary groups conducting a campaign of violence (KKK) against African-Americans to discourage them from voting, especially in the Piedmont counties. Despite that, the number of African-American officeholders peaked in the 1880s as they were elected to local offices in African-American-majority districts.

Hard-pressed poor cotton farmers created the Populist Party to challenge the establishment. Conditions turned much worse in the Panic of 1893, as cotton prices fell. In North Carolina, largely black Republican Party formed a fusion ticket with the largely white Populist, giving them control of the state legislature in 1894. In 1896 the Republican-Populist alliance took control of the governorship and many state offices. In response, many white Democrats began efforts to reduce voter rolls and turnout. During the late 1890s, Democrats began to pass legislation to restrict voter registration and reduce voting by African-Americans and poor whites.

With the first step accomplished in 1896 by making registration more complicated and reducing African-American voter turnout, in 1898 the state's Democratic Party regained control of the state government. Contemporary observers described the election as a "contest unquestionably accompanied by violence, intimidation and fraud—to what extent we do not know—in the securing of a majority of 60,000 for the new arrangement". Using the slogan, "White Supremacy", and backed by influential newspapers such as the Raleigh News and Observer under publisher Josephus Daniels, the Democrats ousted the Populist-Republican majority. By 1900 new laws imposed poll taxes (voters had to pay a $1 tax, but not non-voters), residency requirements, and literacy tests. Initially, the grandfather clause was used to exempt illiterate whites from the literacy test, but many were gradually disfranchised as well. By these efforts, by 1904 white Democratic legislators had eliminated African-American voter turnout in North Carolina. Disfranchisement lasted until it was ended by the federal Voting Rights Act of 1965.

=== 20th century ===
By 1900 North Carolina joined the "Solid Democratic South", with black people still members of the Republican Party but powerless in state and local affairs. However, some counties in North Carolina's western Piedmont and Appalachian Mountains continued to vote Republican, continuing a tradition that dated from their yeoman culture and opposition to secession before the Civil War. In 1928, North Carolina was one of five former Confederate states to vote for Republican Herbert Hoover, also electing two Republican congressmen from the western part of the state, Charles A. Jonas and George M. Pritchard. In 1952, aided by the presidential candidacy of popular war hero Dwight Eisenhower, the Republicans were successful in electing a U.S. Congressman, Charles R. Jonas, the son of Charles A. Jonas.

In the mid-20th century, Republicans began to attract white voters in North Carolina and other Southern states. This was after the passage of the Civil Rights Act of 1964 and the Voting Rights Act of 1965 under Democratic President Lyndon Johnson, which extended Federal protection and enforcement of civil rights for all American citizens. Because the Democratic Party had supported civil rights at the national level, most African-American voters initially aligned with the Democrats when they regained their franchise. In 1972, aided by the landslide re-election of Richard Nixon, Republicans in North Carolina elected their first governor and U.S. senator of the 20th century.

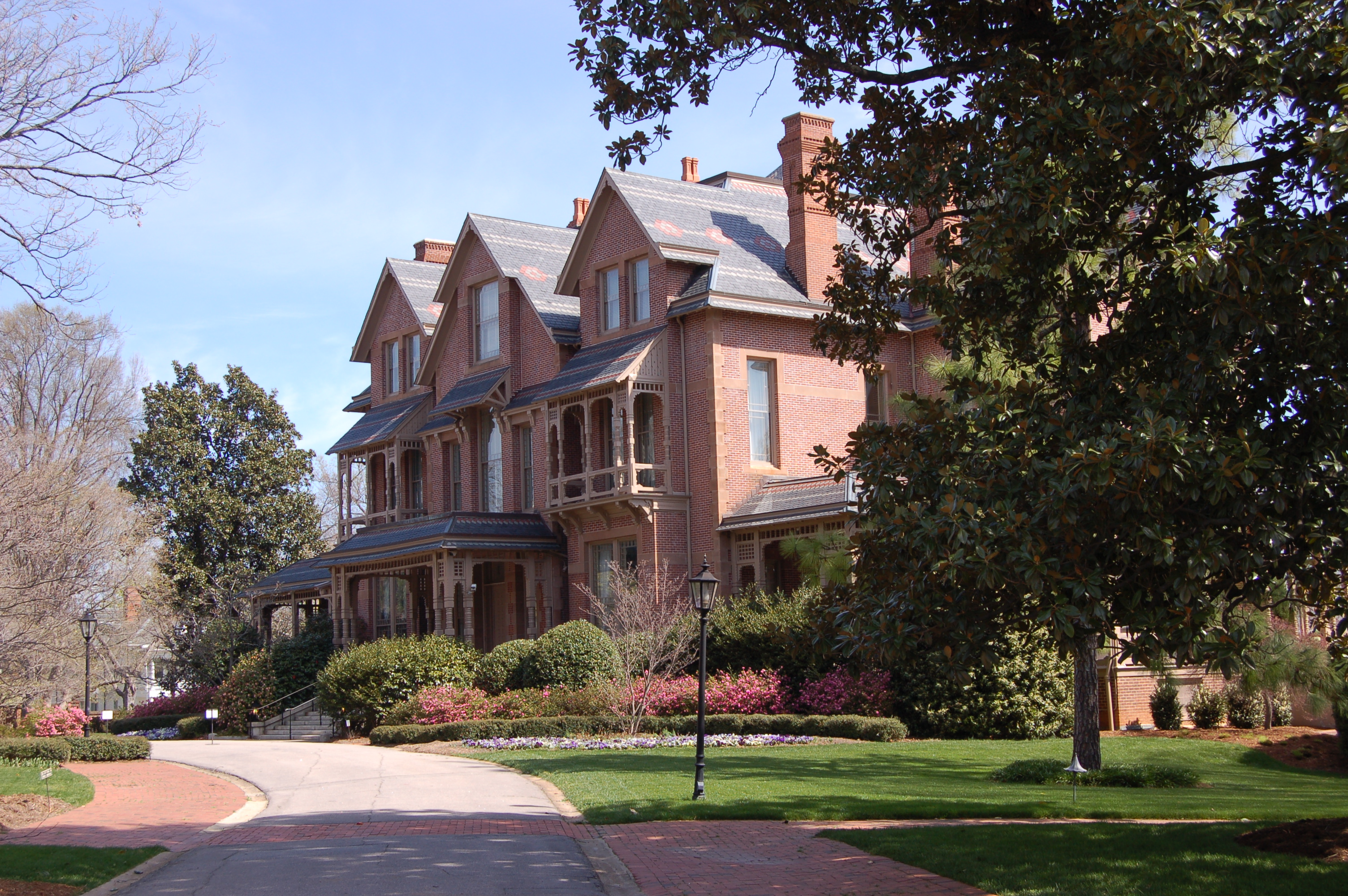
North Carolina Governor's Mansion

Senator Jesse Helms played a major role in renewing the Republican Party and turning North Carolina into a two-party state. Under his banner, many conservative white Democrats in the central and eastern parts of North Carolina began to vote Republican, at least in national elections. In part, this was due to dissatisfaction with the national Democratic Party's stance on issues of civil rights and racial integration. In later decades, conservatives rallied to Republicans over social issues such as prayer in school, gun rights, abortion rights, and gay rights.

Except for regional favorite Jimmy Carter's election in 1976, North Carolina voted Republican in every presidential election from 1968 to 2004. At the state level, however, the Democrats still controlled most of the elected offices during this time. In the middle of the 20th century, North Carolina politics followed a more moderate course than in other conservative Southern states, leading it to gain a reputation as progressive. Political scientist V. O. Key Jr. wrote in his 1949 work, Southern Politics in State and Nation, that North Carolina met "a closer approximation to national norms, or national expectations of performance, than elsewhere in the South. It enjoys a reputation for progressive outlook and action in many phases of life, especially industrial development, education and race relations." However, by the late 1970s, the state's reputation was subjected to increasing scrutiny brought on by the Wilmington Ten criminal case and declining indexes of social and economic well-being.

Two Presidents of the United States, James K. Polk and Andrew Johnson, were born and raised in North Carolina, but both began their political careers in neighboring Tennessee, and were elected president from that state. A third U.S. president, Andrew Jackson, may also have been born in North Carolina. However, as he was born almost precisely on the state line with South Carolina, both states claim him as a native son, and historians have debated for decades over the precise site of Jackson's birthplace. On the grounds of the old state capitol in Raleigh is a statue dedicated to the Presidents who were born in the state; Jackson is included in the statue. Jackson himself stated that he was born in what later became South Carolina, but at the time of his birth, the line between the states had not been surveyed.

=== 21st century ===
North Carolina remains a control state. Only one of the state's 100 counties—Graham, a rural county in the mountains of the western part of the state —remains "dry" (the sale of alcoholic beverages is illegal). Even in rural areas, the opposition to selling and drinking alcoholic beverages is declining.

By 2005, every state surrounding North Carolina had a lottery in operation. That same year, following substantial political maneuvering, the state legislature voted to implement the North Carolina Education Lottery. The state lottery began selling tickets on March 31, 2006. The lottery has had low sales since its inception.

President George W. Bush carried North Carolina by double-digit percentages in 2000 and 2004, but in 2008, a strong year for the Democratic Party, its presidential candidate Barack Obama narrowly defeated Republican candidate John McCain in North Carolina, 49.7% to 49.4%, becoming the first Democratic presidential nominee to win the state in 32 years. In 2012, North Carolina returned to the Republican column with Mitt Romney defeating Obama 50.3% to 48.3%. Thom Tillis and Richard Burr, both Republicans, represent the state in the US Senate.

The Democratic Party's strength is increasingly centered in densely populated urban counties such as Mecklenburg, Wake, Durham, and Guilford, where the bulk of the state's population growth has occurred. The Republicans maintain a strong presence in many of North Carolina's rural and small-town counties. The suburban areas around the state's larger cities usually hold the balance of power and can vote both ways, and in 2008 trended towards the Democratic Party before swinging towards the Republicans in 2010. State and local elections have become highly competitive compared to the previous one-party decades of the 20th century. For example, eastern North Carolina routinely elects Republican sheriffs and county commissioners, a development that did not happen until the 1980s.

In 2010 the Republicans won a majority of both houses of the state legislature for the first time since 1898. Whereas previous congressional redistricting plans for the state had favored Democrats, the newest plan is expected to favor Republicans. In 2012 the state also elected its first Republican governor and lieutenant governor, Pat McCrory and Dan Forest, in more than two decades while also giving the Republicans veto-proof majorities in both the State House of Representatives and State Senate. Several U.S. House of Representatives seats also flipped control, with the Republicans currently controlling ten seats to the Democrats' three.

In 2016, federal courts struck down many of voting restrictions and gerrymandered districts instituted by Republicans, saying they harmed racial minorities. After the 2016 election, Andrew Reynolds, a political science professor at the University of North Carolina at Chapel Hill, drew media attention when he noted that North Carolina's election integrity score, as measured by the Electoral Integrity Project, was similar to Cuba, Indonesia and Sierra Leone. An editorial in The Wall Street Journal, however, says his study is based on flawed data, saying that the higher scores given to autocracies like Rwanda and Cuba only discredited the study. Slate further remarked that the election integrity score of the United States "(62) is below that of Rwanda, a full-on autocracy".

As of 2017, judges in state courts must identify their party affiliation on ballots, making North Carolina the first state in nearly a century to adopt partisan court elections.

== Third parties ==
Since the collapse of the Populists around the turn of the 20th century, third parties, such as the Green Party and Libertarian Party, have had difficulty making inroads in state politics. They have both run candidates for office with neither parties winning a state office. After engaging in a lawsuit with the state over ballot access, the Libertarian Party qualified to be on the ballot after submitting more than 70,000 petition signatures.

In 2016, the Green Party came close to gaining statewide ballot access, closer than the other six new parties, but still fell short of getting the required number of signatures. The party, in collaboration with the Stein/Baraka presidential campaign, helped garner more write-in votes for Jill Stein than any presidential write-in candidate has ever received in North Carolina. After a change to state law, the Green Party gained official standing and ballot access in 2018. Shortly thereafter, the Constitution Party also collected enough signatures to qualify.

== Federal representation ==
North Carolina currently has 14 House districts. In the 119th Congress, North Carolina's House delegation is split between 10 Republicans and 4 Democrats:

- North Carolina's 1st congressional district represented by Don Davis (D)
- North Carolina's 2nd congressional district represented by Deborah K. Ross (D)
- North Carolina's 3rd congressional district represented by Greg Murphy (R)
- North Carolina's 4th congressional district represented by Valerie Foushee (D)
- North Carolina's 5th congressional district represented by Virginia Foxx (R)
- North Carolina's 6th congressional district represented by Addison McDowell (R)
- North Carolina's 7th congressional district represented by David Rouzer (R)
- North Carolina's 8th congressional district represented by Dan Bishop (R)
- North Carolina's 9th congressional district represented by Richard Hudson (R)
- North Carolina's 10th congressional district represented by Pat Harrigan (R)
- North Carolina's 11th congressional district represented by Chuck Edwards (R)
- North Carolina's 12th congressional district represented by Alma Adams (D)
- North Carolina's 13th congressional district represented by Brad Knott (R)
- North Carolina's 14th congressional district represented by Tim Moore (R)

North Carolina's two United States senators are Republicans Thom Tillis and Ted Budd, serving since 2015 and 2023, respectively.

North Carolina is part of the United States District Court for the Western District of North Carolina, United States District Court for the Middle District of North Carolina, and the United States District Court for the Eastern District of North Carolina in the federal judiciary. The district's cases are appealed to the Richmond-based United States Court of Appeals for the Fourth Circuit.

== See also ==
- 2024 North Carolina elections
- Elections in North Carolina
- Government of North Carolina
- Political party strength in North Carolina
- Politics of the United States
- Disfranchisement after Reconstruction era
- Voting rights in the United States
- Law of North Carolina
