= 1993–94 KNVB Cup =

Tournament details
- Country: Netherlands
- Teams: 63

Final positions
- Champions: Feyenoord
- Runners-up: NEC

Tournament statistics
- Top goal scorer(s): Pierre van Hooijdonk; Stefan Pettersson; Harry van der Laan; Jelle Visser; Emiel van Eijkeren (4 goals)

The 1993-94 KNVB Cup was the 76th edition of the Dutch national football annual knockout tournament for the KNVB Cup. 63 teams contested, beginning on 28 August 1993 at the final on 12 May 1994.

Feyenoord beat NEC 2–1 and won the cup for the ninth time.

== Teams ==
- All 18 participants of the Eredivisie 1993-94, eleven of which entering in the third round, the rest entering in the second round
- All 18 participants of the Eerste Divisie 1993-94, entering in the second round
- One youth team, entering in the second round
- 26 teams from lower (amateur) leagues, five of which entering in the second round

== First round ==
The matches of the first round were played on 28-29 August 1993. Only amateur teams participated.

Home team	Result	Away team
ADO '20	3–4	SV Huizen
Excelsior Maassluis	1–2	IJsselmeervogels
FC Lisse	7–1	VV Appingedam
Quick Boys	1–3	ACV
SC Genemuiden	0–5	AFC
SDVB	6–2 (aet)	WHC
Be Quick 1887	1–3	RKSV Halsteren
BVV	1–5	TONEGIDO
SV Panningen	2–4	Achilles'29
SV Meerssen	1–2	De Treffers

== Second round ==
The matches of the second round were played on October 8, 9 and 10, 1993. Except for eleven Eredivisie teams, all other participants entered the tournament here.

Home team	Result	Away team
NAC Breda _{E}	5–2	AFC _{A}
NEC _{1}	2–1	FC Lisse _{A}
RBC _{1}	1–0	FC Groningen _{E}
SDVB _{A}	1–5	sc Heerenveen _{E}
Veendam _{1}	2–3	VV Lunteren _{A}
VVV-Venlo _{E}	5–3	VV Geldrop _{A}
De Treffers _{A}	2–1 (aet)	Young Vitesse
HFC Haarlem _{1}	1–2	Telstar _{1}
RKSV Halsteren _{A}	0–2	Dordrecht'90 _{1}
USV Holland _{A}	(p) 3-3	TOP Oss _{1}

Home team	Result	Away team
IJsselmeervogels _{A}	1–2 (aet)	Go Ahead Eagles _{E}
Cambuur Leeuwarden _{E}	0–1	Sparta _{E}
ADO Den Haag _{1}	5–2	ACV _{A}
AZ _{1}	2–1	SV Huizen _{A}
FC Eindhoven _{1}	1–2	De Graafschap _{1}
FC Emmen _{1}	2–0	FC Zwolle _{1}
Excelsior _{1}	6–0	Kozakken Boys _{A}
FC Den Bosch _{1}	3–0	TONEGIDO _{A}
Helmond Sport _{1}	3–1	Achilles'29 _{A}
SC Heracles _{1}	2–0	Quick '20 _{A}
VV Katwijk _{A}	2–5	Fortuna Sittard _{1}

_{E} Eredivisie; _{1} Eerste Divisie; _{A} Amateur teams

== Third round ==
The matches of the third round were played on November 10, 11 and 14, 1993. The eleven highest ranked Eredivisie clubs from last season entered the tournament this round.

Home team	Result	Away team
SC Heracles	0–0 (p: 2–4)	Willem II _{E}
MVV _{E}	5–3 (aet)	VV Lunteren
NAC Breda	3–2 (aet)	VVV-Venlo
RKC Waalwijk _{E}	4–0	RBC
Telstar	2–1	FC Volendam _{E}
Sparta	2–2 (p: 0–3)	PSV _{E}
USV Holland	1–7	FC Twente _{E}
Dordrecht'90	6–2	FC Emmen (on December 15)

Home team	Result	Away team
Ajax _{E}	8–3	sc Heerenveen
AZ	2–0	Fortuna Sittard
De Graafschap	2–1 (aet)	Vitesse Arnhem _{E}
De Treffers	1–3	NEC
Excelsior	2–3 (aet)	Feyenoord _{E}
FC Utrecht _{E}	2–3	FC Den Bosch
Go Ahead Eagles	2–3	ADO Den Haag
Helmond Sport	1–0 (aet)	Roda JC _{E}

_{E} eleven Eredivisie entrants

== Round of 16 ==
The matches of the round of 16 were played on December 15, 1993, and on January 9 and January 12, 1994.

Home team	Result	Away team
Ajax	4–1	FC Twente
Helmond Sport	1–0	FC Den Bosch
NEC	2–0	De Graafschap
PSV	2–1	Willem II
RKC Waalwijk	2–1	Telstar
Dordrecht'90	0–2	Feyenoord
ADO Den Haag	5–1	MVV
NAC Breda	3–2	AZ

== Quarter finals ==
The quarter finals were played on February 9, 1994.

Home team	Result	Away team
ADO Den Haag	1–3	NEC
Ajax	7–1	Helmond Sport
NAC Breda	1–0 (aet)	PSV
RKC Waalwijk	2–4	Feyenoord

== Semi-finals ==
The semi-finals were played on March 9 and 20, 1994.

Home team	Result	Away team
NAC Breda	0–3	Feyenoord
Ajax	1–2	NEC

== Final ==
12 May 1994
18:00

Feyenoord	2–1	NEC
Heus 7' (pen.) van Loen 81'		Dekker 90'

De Kuip, Rotterdam
Attendance: 43,000
Referee: Mario van der Ende

Feyenoord would participate in the Cup Winners' Cup.
