= Holli Semetko =

American political scientist

Holli A. Semetko
- Education: Albion College; London School of Economics; Emory University
- Awards: Beer Prize, British Politics Group; Worcester Prize, WAPOR; Kaid-Sanders Award, APSA
- Scientific career
- Fields: Political science; Media studies
- Workplaces: Harvard University; Syracuse University; University of Amsterdam; Emory University

Holli A. Semetko is an American political scientist. As of 2025, she serves as the Asa Griggs Candler professor of media and international affairs at Emory University. She previously served as Emory University's Vice Provost for International Affairs, Director of the Office of International Affairs, and the Director of the Claus M. Halle Institute for Global Learning from 2003 to 2013. In a 2019 study on the top 400 most-cited authors in political science, Semetko was named among the top 40 most cited women in political science. Her research focuses on social media, campaigning and influence, political communication, public opinion, and political campaigns in comparative perspective.

== Education and early career ==
Semetko was born in Trenton, Michigan. She graduated from Albion College with a BA in both political science and economics. Semetko earned an MSc in political sociology from the London School of Economics and Political Science, followed by a PhD. Semetko's dissertation won the 1989 Samuel H. Beer Dissertation Prize, which is awarded by the British Politics Group "to reward exceptional work" in the area of British politics. In May 2013, she was awarded an executive MBA from the Goizueta Business School at Emory University.

In 1994, Semetko was a research fellow at the Shorenstein Center on Media, Politics and Public Policy at Harvard University. She then joined the faculty at Syracuse University, and in 1995 she moved to The University of Amsterdam, to serve as Professor and Chair of Audience and Public Opinion Research, then Chair of the Department of Communication Science and founding board chair of the Amsterdam School of Communications Research (ASCoR). Semetko moved to Emory University in 2003.

== Career ==
=== Research ===
In addition to publishing several dozen journal articles, Semetko has written or edited a number of books in comparative politics and political communication. In 1999, she coauthored the book On message: Communicating the campaign with Pippa Norris, John Curtice, David Sanders, and Margaret Scammell. The book uses the 1997 United Kingdom general election as a case to study the role of campaigning and political media in election outcomes. The book used a variety of methodologies to study that campaign, prompting Shanto Iyengar to write: "At last, a genuinely multi-method study of political campaigning".

In 1991, Semetko coauthored the comparative study of the 1984 United States presidential election and the 1983 United Kingdom general election, The Formation of Campaign Agendas: A Comparative Analysis of Party and Media Roles in Recent American and British Elections. Doris Graber reviewed this book as "a path-breaking, major work", with Ann N. Crigler writing in the American Political Science Review that it is "a well-researched and clearly written piece of scholarship that advances knowledge about the transactional relationships between the institutions of the press and politics". Among her other books, Semetko co-edited, with Margaret Scammell, The Sage Handbook of Political Communication.

Semetko received the 1992 Robert M. Worcester Prize which is given by the World Association for Public Opinion Research to the best article in the International Journal of Public Opinion Research, for an article that she coauthored with Joanne Bay Brzinski, David Weaver, and Lars Willnat. Her article with Kees Aarts, titled "The Divided Electorate: Effects of Media Use on Political Involvement" and published in The Journal of Politics, received the 2003 Kaid-Sanders Award for Best Political Communication Article of the Year from the Political Communication section of the American Political Science Association.

In 2019, a citation analysis by the political scientists Hannah June Kim and Bernard Grofman listed Semetko among the top 40 most cited women working as a political scientist at an American university.

=== Academic positions ===
From 2003 to 2013, Semetko was the Director of the Claus M. Halle Institute for Global Learning. At the end of her tenure as Director, then-Provost Earl Lewis wrote that the "Halle Institute's visibility, its programs and partnership, affiliated faculty and publications, have grown significantly under Dr. Semetko's creative leadership", citing the examples of her creation of an Emory-Nanjing Visiting Scholars Program and expanding various opportunities for Halle Institute scholars to conduct research abroad. Semetko has also been the Vice-Provost for International Affairs at Emory University, and the Director of the Office of International Affairs there.

In 2011, Semetko was elected as a life member to the Council on Foreign Relations. Semetko has also been a visiting scholar and a Fulbright scholar at IIT-Bombay Indian Institutes of Technology.

== Selected works ==
- On message: Communicating the campaign, with Pippa Norris, John Curtice, David Sanders, and Margaret Scammell (1999)
- "Framing European politics: A content analysis of press and television news", Journal of Communication, with Patti Valkenburg (2000)
- "The Divided Electorate: Effects of Media Use on Political Involvement", The Journal of Politics, with Kees Aarts (2003)
- Co-editor, The Sage Handbook of Political Communication (2012)

== Selected awards ==
- Samuel H. Beer Best Dissertation Prize (1989)
- Robert M. Worcester prize, World Association for Public Opinion Research (1992)
- Kaid-Sanders Award, American Political Science Association (2003)
