= Pippa Norris =

Political scientist

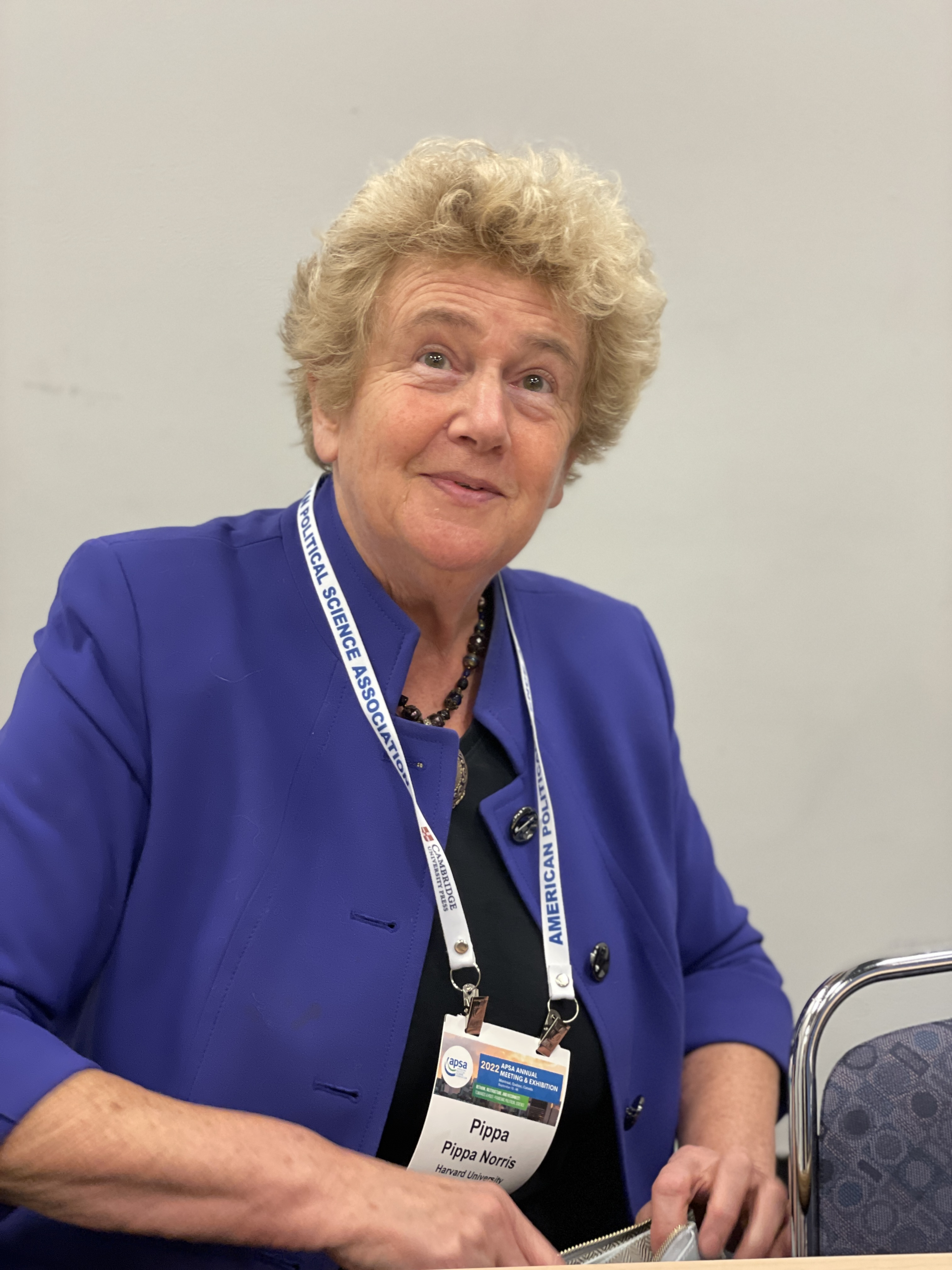
- Norris in 2022
- Born: 10 July 1953 (age 73); London, England
- Board member of: Electoral Integrity Project
- Awards: Karl Deutsch Award (2014); Johan Skytte Prize (2011)

Academic background
- Education: University of Warwick (BA); London School of Economics (MA, PhD)
- Influences: Ronald F. Inglehart

Academic work
- Discipline: Political science
- Sub-discipline: Comparative politics; Political sociology
- Institutions: University of Edinburgh; Harvard University
- Main interests: Comparative politics, public opinion, democracy

Pippa Norris (born 10 July 1953) is a British-American political scientist specializing in comparative politics. She is the McGuire Lecturer in Comparative Politics at the Harvard Kennedy School at Harvard University, and she has served as the Australian Laureate Fellow and Professor of Government and International Relations at the University of Sydney, and Director of the Electoral Integrity Project.

== Education ==
Norris holds a Bachelor of Arts in politics and philosophy with joint honors from Warwick University, as well as a masters and doctoral degree in politics from the London School of Economics, and Honorary Doctorates from the University of Edinburgh, University of Bergen, Leuphana University, and Warwick University. Prior to joining Harvard in 1993, she taught Politics at University of Edinburgh.

== Awards and recognition ==
Norris is a fellow of the British Academy and she has been elected to the American Academy of Arts and Sciences for her achievements in the field of political science.

Norris and Joni Lovenduski's book on Political Recruitment: Gender, Race and Class (Cambridge University Press, 1995) was awarded the 2018 George H. Hallett prize by APSA "for a book published at least ten years ago which has made a lasting contribution to the literature on representation and electoral systems". She has also received the Doris Graber book award for A Virtuous Circle, honored as the best book in political communications.

She was honored by award of the Sir Isaiah Berlin Lifetime Achievement award by the Political Studies Association of the UK "for the significant contribution she has made as a major political thinker and in helping to shape academic research on democracy, electoral integrity, and populism–all issues that are relevant now more than ever."

She has also received the Karl Deutsch Award for her contribution to interdisciplinary research from the International Political Science Association.

In 2011 Norris and Ronald Inglehart were awarded the Johan Skytte Prize in Political Science for "contributing innovative ideas about the relevance and roots of political culture in a global context, transcending previous mainstream approaches of research".

Norris was awarded the inaugural Kathleen Fitzpatrick Australian Laureate Fellowship in 2011.

== Selected publications ==
=== Monographs ===
- Pippa Norris. 1986. Politics of Sex. Lynne Reinner.
- Pippa Norris. 1990. British By-elections. Blackwell.
- Pippa Norris and Joni Lovenduski. 1995. Gender, Race, and Class in the British Parliament. Cambridge University Press.
- Pippa Norris. 1997. Electoral Change Since 1945. Sage.
- Pippa Norris, John Curtice, David Sanders, Margaret Scammell and Holli A. Semetko. 1999. On Message. Sage.
- Pippa Norris. 2000 A Virtuous Circle: Political Communications in Post-Industrial Democracies. Cambridge: Cambridge University Press. Pp. 398.
- Pippa Norris. 2001 Digital Divide? Civic Engagement, Information Poverty and the Internet Worldwide. Cambridge: Cambridge University Press. Pp. 303.
- Pippa Norris. 2002. Democratic Phoenix: Reinventing Political Activism. New York: Cambridge University Press.
- Ronald Inglehart and Pippa Norris. 2003. Rising Tide: Gender Equality & Cultural Change around the World. Coauthored with Ronald Inglehart. New York: Cambridge University Press.
- Pippa Norris. 2004 Electoral Engineering: Voting Rules and Political Behavior. New York: Cambridge University Press.
- Pippa Norris and Ronald Inglehart. 2004. Sacred and Secular: Politics and Religion Worldwide. New York: Cambridge University Press.
- Pippa Norris. 2005. Radical Right: Voters and Parties in the Electoral Market. New York: Cambridge University Press.
- Pippa Norris. 2008. Driving Democracy: Do Power-Sharing Institutions Work? New York: Cambridge University Press.
- Pippa Norris and Ronald Inglehart. 2009. Cosmopolitan Communications: Cultural Diversity in a Globalized World. New York: Cambridge University Press
- Pippa Norris. 2011. Democratic Deficit: Critical Citizens Revisited. New York: Cambridge University Press.
- Pippa Norris. 2012. Making Democratic Governance Work: The Impact of Regimes on Prosperity, Welfare and Peace. New York: Cambridge University Press.
- Pippa Norris. 2014. Why Electoral Integrity Matters. New York: Cambridge University Press.
- Pippa Norris. 2015. Why Elections Fail. New York: Cambridge University Press.
- Pippa Norris. 2017. Strengthening Electoral Integrit. New York: Cambridge University Press.
- Pippa Norris and Ronald Inglehart. 2019. Cultural Backlash. New York: Cambridge University Press.
- Pippa Norris. 2022. In Praise of Skepticism: Trust but Verify. Oxford: Oxford University Press

=== Edited books ===
- British Elections & Parties Yearbook (coedited, 1991, 1992, 1993)
- Gender and Party Politics (coedited with Joni Lovenduski, Sage 1993)
- Different Voices, Different Lives (coedited with Joni Lovenduski and Marianne Githens, 1994)
- Women in Politics (coedited with Joni Lovenduski, Oxford University Press 1996)
- Comparing Democracies (coedited with Lawrence LeDuc and Richard Niemi, 1996, 2nd ed. 2002, 3rd edition Sage 2009)
- Britain Votes 1997 (Oxford University Press 1997)
- Women, Media and Politics (Oxford University Press 1997)
- Politics and the Press (1997)
- Passages to Power (1997)
- Elections and Voting Behaviour (1998)
- The Politics of News (coedited with Doris Graber and Denis McQuail 1998 CQ Press, 2nd edition 2007)
- Critical Citizens (Oxford University Press 1999)
- Critical Elections (coedited with Geoffrey Evans, Sage 1999)
- Britain Votes 2001 (Oxford University Press 2001)
- Framing Terrorism (coedited with Marion Just and Montague Kern, Routledge 2003)
- Britain Votes 2005 (coedited with Christopher Wlezien, Sage 2005)
- Comparing Democracies 4 (coedited with Lawrence LeDuc and Richard Niemi, Sage 2014)
- Public Sentinel: News Media and the Governance Agenda (World Bank 2009)
- Advancing Electoral Integrity (coedited with Richard Frank and Ferran Martínez i Coma, Oxford University Press 2014)
- Contentious Elections coedited with Richard Frank and Ferran Martinez i Coma, Routledge, 2015).

She contributed to the Routledge Handbook of Election Law.
