= Tarek Masoud =

American academic

Tarek Masoud is the Ford Foundation Professor of Democracy and Governance at the John F. Kennedy School of Government at Harvard University.

== Biography ==
Masoud was born in Oshkosh, Wisconsin, to Egyptian immigrants and was raised in Saudi Arabia. Masoud attended Phillips Exeter Academy for high school and earned his Bachelor of Arts degree with honors at Brown University in political science in 1997. He then went on to Yale University, where he earned a Master of Arts, a Master of Philosophy and a PhD, all in political science.

He is the faculty director of the Kennedy School's Middle East Initiative, and the convener of Harvard's Middle East Dialogues, which consist of interviews with such figures as Jared Kushner; former Palestinian Prime Minister Salam Fayyad; former Saudi Ambassador to the United States, Prince Turki Al-Faisal; and Micah Goodman, author of Catch 67: The Left, The Right, and the Legacy of the Six-Day War.

== Works ==
- Counting Islam: Religion, Class, and Elections in Egypt (2014)
- The Arab Spring: Pathways of Repression and Reform with Jason Brownlee and Andrew Reynolds (2015)
- Democracy in Hard Places edited with Scott Mainwaring (2023)
