= Santi Kolk =

Dutch former professional footballer (born 1981)

Personal information
- Full name: Santiago Torti Kolk
- Date of birth: 2 October 1981 (age 45)
- Place of birth: The Hague, Netherlands
- Height: 1.80 m (5 ft 11 in)
- Positions: Winger; forward

Youth career
- 1986–1989: Dynamo '67
- 1989–1995: HVV Laakkwartier
- 1995–1999: ADO Den Haag

Senior career*
Years	Team	Apps	(Gls)
1999–2000	ADO Den Haag	15	(2)
2000–2004	Heerenveen	26	(1)
2001–2002	→ RKC Waalwijk (loan)	21	(1)
2003	→ ADO Den Haag (loan)	12	(3)
2003–2004	→ Den Bosch (loan)	22	(2)
2004–2006	Feyenoord	0	(0)
2004–2005	→ Excelsior (loan)	36	(10)
2005–2006	→ Zwolle (loan)	29	(18)
2006–2007	ADO Den Haag	29	(12)
2007–2010	Vitesse	69	(19)
2010–2012	Union Berlin	17	(4)
2011–2012	→ NAC Breda (loan)	26	(5)
2013	ADO Den Haag	13	(2)
Total		315	(79)

International career
2002	Netherlands U21	1	(0)
- * Club domestic league appearances and goals

Santiago Torti "Santi" Kolk (born 2 October 1981) is a Dutch former professional footballer. He currently works as a football agent. He mostly played as a forward during his career.

Kolk emerged as a talent from the ADO Den Haag academy in 1999, scoring in his senior debut. He signed with Heerenveen the following year, where he made his European debut, but soon saw himself loaned out to second-tier clubs. After a stint with Feyenoord, where he made no appearances, he returned to ADO where he experienced a breakout season, scoring 12 goals in 30 games which facilitated a move to Vitesse. Three successful seasons prompted him to join German 2. Bundesliga club Union Berlin. Injuries hindered him during his time there, and he retired as part of ADO in November 2013.

After his retirement, Kolk has worked as an agent for Juzzt Football, representing Denzel Dumfries among others.

== Club career ==
=== ADO Den Haag ===
Born in The Hague, Kolk played youth football for Dynamo '67 in Rijswijk and HVV Laakkwartier, before joining the ADO Den Haag youth academy as a 15-year-old. He made his professional debut on 29 August 1999 as part of the ADO Den Haag first team in a home match against NAC Breda. Coming on as a second-half substitute for Dennis Iliohan, he scored his first goal after only being on the pitch for one minute as ADO won 3–0.

=== Heerenveen ===
In 2000, Kolk signed a five-year contract with SC Heerenveen at age 18 as an emerging talent. He made his debut for the club on 26 August 2000 in a 2–0 away win over Fortuna Sittard. On 25 October, Kolk made his European debut in the UEFA Champions League group stage match against Lyon, coming on as a 68th-minute substitute for Jeffrey Talan in a 2–0 home loss. He scored his first goal for Heerenveen on 17 December in a 3–0 away win over RBC Roosendaal. During his first season at the club, he would mostly appear as a substitute, as the club finished in a disappointing 10th place.

After returning from a loan at ADO, Kolk's chances of playing time improved after fellow forward Romano Denneboom was told to leave. This meant that Kolk was in the starting lineup against Spanish club Villarreal in the play-off round of the UEFA Cup on 26 August 2003. At Heerenveen, however, he clashed with head coach Foppe de Haan, which Kolk later admitted was due to his own "selfishness".

==== Loans ====
On 15 October 2001, RKC Waalwijk agreed to loan Kolk for the remainder of the season in order for him to gain more playing time. He made his first appearance for the club on 20 October in a 3–1 away loss to Willem II.

He spent the second half of the 2002–03 season on loan with his former club ADO Den Haag and the entire 2003–04 season Den Bosch, winning the second-tier Eerste Divisie with both clubs.

=== Feyenoord ===
On 14 August 2004, it was announced that Feyenoord had signed Kolk on a two-year contract with an option for two additional years. As part of the deal, Kolk was sent on loan to satellite club Excelsior. He scored 10 goals in 34 league appearances for the club during the 2004–05 season in which Excelsior finished 12th in the Eerste Divisie. Kolk later recalled his season with the club: "it was a team where fun was key. We laughed so much."

On 31 August 2005, Kolk was sent on a one-season loan to Zwolle, with Dominggus Lim-Duan making a move in the opposite direction to Excelsior. He had a highly successful season at the club, and finished as shared top scorer of the Eerste Divisie with 19 goals, alongside Berry Powel.

=== Return to ADO ===
On 11 May 2006, Kolk returned to his first senior club ADO on a two-year contract. He made 30 appearances during the 2006–07 season, in which he scored 12 goals as he could not heed the club from relegation, with ADO finishing bottom of the league.

In 2007, after having played for seven clubs in eight years, Kolk commented on the fact that he had played for a relatively large number of different clubs, by stating: "I am sort of the Dutch Christian Vieri."

=== Vitesse ===
Kolk signed a four-year contract with Vitesse on 31 May 2007, after turning down an offer from Twente. Signing with Vitesse, he was united with fellow Hagenees, head coach Aad de Mos who played a substantial role in signing Kolk. He would grow into a key player for the club, scoring 12 goals in 2008.

In October 2009, Kolk lost his place in the starting lineup after suffering an achilles tendon injury. While he recuperated from the injury, Nicky Hofs and Lasse Nilsson formed a duo in attack, with Kolk only returning as a starter on 22 January 2010 after a suspension for Hofs. His contract was not renewed after the 2009–10 season. He made 87 appearances during his time at Vitesse, in which he scored 23 goals.

=== Union Berlin ===
In July 2010, Kolk agreed to a three-year contract with 1. FC Union Berlin, who at that point were playing in the 2. Bundesliga. He made his debut for the club on 15 August against Hallescher FC. In his second game on 28 August, he scored a goal against SpVgg Greuther Fürth. He scored three goals in his first six games, after which his season was repeatedly interrupted by injuries and ended prematurely in March 2011 with a foot injury. In total, he made 17 appearances and scored four goals in the 2010–11 season. In the 2011–12 season Kolk would go on to play for NAC Breda on loan. In June 2012, Union and Kolk decided to terminate his contract by mutual consent, making him a free agent.

In January 2013, Kolk returned to ADO Den Haag for the fourth time in his career. He had secured a contract after a successful trial where he, among others, impressed at the team's training camp in Estepona.

Kolk announced his retirement from football on 27 November 2013, after a move to the Indian Super League fell through. He would instead focus on obtaining his coaching diploma.

== International career ==
Kolk also played in several Dutch national youth teams. He was part of Louis van Gaal's squad for the 2001 FIFA World Youth Championship in Argentina.

== Post-playing career ==
In 2014, a year after retiring from football, Kolk started as an agent and was hired by Juzzt Football, a Dutch football agency. He represented Denzel Dumfries until 2019.

== Honours ==
ADO Den Haag

- Eerste Divisie: 2002–03

Den Bosch

- Eerste Divisie: 2003–04

Individual

- Eerste Divisie Golden Boot: 2005–06
