= Harry Melis =

Dutch footballer

Personal information
- Date of birth: 25 April 1957 (age 69)
- Place of birth: Rotterdam, Netherlands
- Position: Winger

Youth career
- Coal
- Feyenoord

Senior career*
Years	Team	Apps	(Gls)
1976–1979	Feyenoord	47	(5)
1979–1982	FC Den Haag	85	(24)
1982–1983	Germinal Ekeren		
1983–1987	DS '79	95	(12)
- * Club domestic league appearances and goals

Harry Melis (born 25 April 1957) is a Dutch former professional footballer who played as a winger. Melis played in the Eredivisie for Feyenoord, FC Den Haag and DS '79. He also spent a season in Belgian club football with Germinal Ekeren.

Harry's daughter Manon Melis also became a professional footballer and represented the Netherlands women's national football team.
