= Electoral Integrity Project =

Project surveying academics on their perception electoral integrity worldwide

The Electoral Integrity Project is a project based at Royal Military College of Canada and the University of East Anglia, England, which publishes rankings by country according to the project's view of its electoral integrity. It also organises international conferences and workshops. The 2021 Electoral Integrity Global Report, covered 480 elections in 169 countries from mid 2012 to the end of 2021. It was directed by Holly Ann Garnett and Toby S. James. It was founded in 2012 by Pippa Norris and initially housed at Harvard University and the University of Sydney.

== Findings ==
One of the project's International Advisory Board, Andrew Reynolds, a political science professor at the University of North Carolina at Chapel Hill, noted in the Raleigh-based The News & Observer that his home state's 2016 election integrity score was similar to Cuba, Indonesia and Sierra Leone. The study ranked integrity of the state's congressional districts lowest in the nation just below similar outlier Wisconsin.

== Reception ==
Kaila White of The Arizona Republic described the methodology as being widely trusted and used to compare electoral performance around the world.

The project received media attention in 2016 when it ranked the United States last among Western nations. An editorial in The Wall Street Journal ridiculed the study, noting that "Democracy in New York (which scored a 61) and Virginia (60) is supposedly more imperiled than in Rwanda (64), though Rwanda is controlled by an autocrat. The worst-performing state, Arizona (53), is outranked by Kuwait (55), Ivory Coast (59) and Kyrgyzstan (54)." Dylan Matthews writing in Vox agreed that "it seems foolish to infer from that that the US is less of a democracy than Rwanda" but felt that the EIP had highlighted important issues such as gerrymandering and voter registration laws.

Statistician Andrew Gelman critiqued the index as seeming like "an unstable combination of political ideology, academic self-promotion, credulous journalism, and plain old incompetence", noting among other things that the EIP's 2014 data release has previously given the North Korean parliamentary election an 'electoral integrity' score of 65.3 and Cuba 65.6, higher than elections in EU members Romania and Bulgaria. Norris replied to Gelman noting that her team had subsequently dropped the North Korean election from the dataset. Gelman, however, questioned her justification for this removal and continued to question the EIP's methodology more generally.
