= Lynda Lee Kaid =

- Born: August 22, 1948; Eldorado, Illinois, US
- Died: April 13, 2011 (aged 62); Gainesville, Florida, US
- Other name: Lynda Lee Kaid Jones
- Occupations: Professor and Author
- Years active: 1974 to 2011
- Spouse: Clifford Alan Jones

Academic background
- Education: Southern Illinois University (Ph.D., M.S., B.A.)

Academic work
- Discipline: Political Communication and Political Advertising
- Institutions: University of Florida (2001 to 2011); University of Oklahoma (1974 to 2000)

Lynda Lee Kaid (August 22, 1948 – April 13, 2011) was a professor of Telecommunication and Research Foundation Professor in the College of Journalism & Communications at the University of Florida and named by Communication Quarterly as one of the most productive scholars in the communication discipline. She authored more than 30 books and more than 200 peer-reviewed articles and chapters on political communication and political advertising.

Kaid was honored as a Distinguished Alumni in 2007 from Southern Illinois University. She earned a doctorate and master's degree in speech communication and a bachelor's degree in German from SIU.

She was a three-time Fulbright Scholar. Dr. Kaid was a University of Florida Research Foundation Professor.

The National Communication Association's Political Communication Division established the annual Lynda Lee Kaid Outstanding Dissertation in Political Communication award. The International Communication Association's Political Communication Division established the Keith R. Sanders and Lynda Lee Kaid Best Political Communication Article of the Year Award. She died from injuries suffered in a fall at her home.

== Selected bibliography ==
- Kaid, L. L. & Wadsworth, A. J. Political Campaign Communication: A Bibliography and Guide to the Literature 1973-1982. (Scarecrow Press, 1985).
- Sanders, K. R., Kaid, L. L., & Nimmo, D. Political Communication Yearbook, 1984. (Southern Illinois University Press, 1985).
- Kaid, L. L., Nimmo, D., & Sanders, K. R. (Eds.), New Perspectives on Political Advertising. (Southern Illinois University Press, 1986).
- Kaid, L. L. & Holtz-Bacha, C. (Eds.), Political Advertising in Western Democracies: Parties and Candidates on Television. (Sage Publications, 1995).
- Ragan, S., Bystrom, D. G., Kaid, L. L., & Beck, C. (Eds.), The Lynching of Language: Gender, Politics, and Power in the Hill-Thomas Hearings. (University of Illinois Press, 1996).
- Kaid, L. L. & Bystrom, D. (Eds.), The Electronic Election: Perspectives on the 1996 Campaign Communication. (Routledge, 1998).
- Johnston, A. & Kaid, L. L. Communicating Politics: Engaging the Public in Democratic Life. (Praeger, 2000).
- Kaid, L. L., McKinney, M. S., & Tedesco, J. C. (Eds.). Civic Dialogue in the 1996 Presidential Campaign: Candidate, Media, and Public Voices. (Hampton Press, 2001).
- Kaid, L. L., Tedesco, J. C., Bystrom, D. G., McKinney, M. S. (Eds.). The Millennium Election: Communication in the 2000 Campaign. (Rowman & Littlefield, 2003).
- Kaid, L. L. (Ed.), Handbook of Political Communication Research. (Routledge, 2004).
- McKinney, M. S., Kaid, L. L., Bystrom, D. G., & Carlin, D. B. (Eds.), Communicating Politics: Engaging the Public in Democratic Life. (Peter Lang, 2005).
- Kaid, L. L. & Holtz-Bacha, C. (Eds.), The SAGE Handbook of Political Advertising. (Sage Publications, 2006).
- Kaid, L. L. & Holtz-Bacha, C. (Eds.), Encyclopedia of Political Communication. (Sage Publications, 2007).
- Kaid, L. L. (Ed.), The EU Expansion: Communicating Shared Sovereignty in the Parliamentary Elections. (Peter Lang, 2007).
- Strömbäck, J. & Kaid, L. L. (Eds.), The Handbook of Election News Coverage Around the World. (Routledge, 2009).
- Oates, S., Kaid, L. L., & Berry, M. Terrorism, Elections, and Democracy: Political Campaigns in the United States, Great Britain, and Russia. (Palgrave Macmillan, 2010).
- Kaid, L. L. (Ed.), Television and Politics in Evolving European Democracies. (Nova Science Publishers, 2011).
- Hendricks, J. A. & Kaid, L. L. (Eds.), Techno Politics in Presidential Campaigning: New Voices, New Technologies and New Voters. (Routledge, 2011).
