= 1868 United States presidential election in North Carolina =

- November 3, 1868
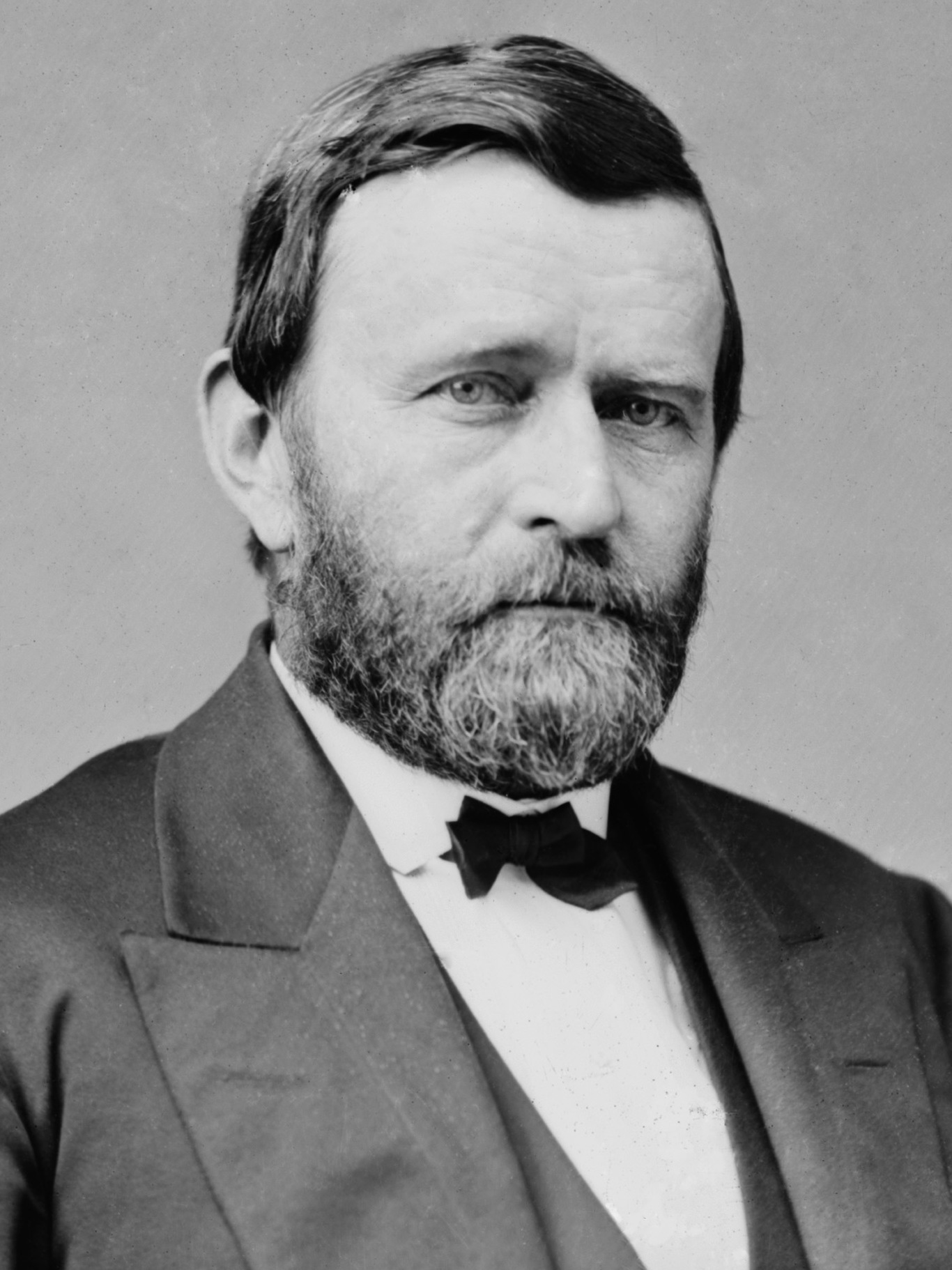

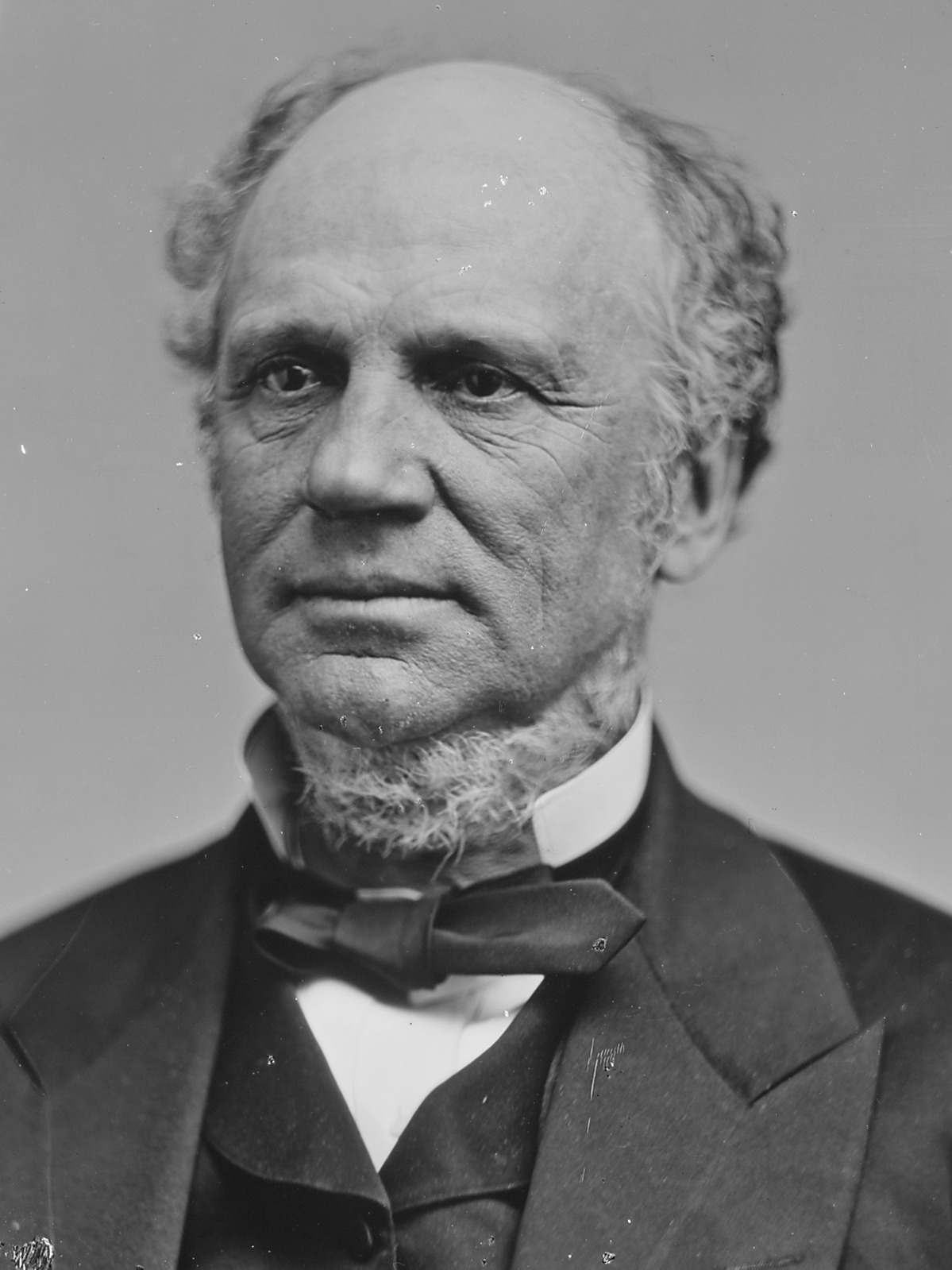
Nominee	Ulysses S. Grant	Horatio Seymour
Party	Republican	Democratic
Home state	Illinois	New York
Running mate	Schuyler Colfax	Francis Preston Blair Jr.
Electoral vote	9	0
Popular vote	96,939	84,559
Percentage	53.41%	46.59%
County results
Grant
50–60%
60–70%
70–80%
80–90%
Seymour
50–60%
60–70%
70–80%
President before election
Andrew Johnson
Democratic
Elected President
Ulysses S. Grant
Republican

The 1868 United States presidential election in North Carolina took place on November 3, 1868, as part of the 1868 United States presidential election. State voters chose nine representatives, or electors, to the Electoral College, who voted for president and vice president.

North Carolina was won by Ulysses S. Grant, formerly the 6th Commanding General of the United States Army (R-Illinois), running with Speaker of the House Schuyler Colfax, with 53.41% of the popular vote, against the 18th governor of New York, Horatio Seymour (D–New York), running with former Senator Francis Preston Blair Jr., with 46.59% of the vote. As of the 2024 presidential election this is the last election in which Yadkin County voted for the Democratic presidential nominee.

== Results ==
1868 United States presidential election in North Carolina
Party	Candidate	Running mate	Popular vote		Electoral vote	
Party	Candidate	Running mate	Count	%	Count	%
Republican	Ulysses S. Grant of Illinois	Schuyler Colfax of Indiana	96,939	53.41%	9	100.00%
Democratic	Horatio Seymour of New York	Francis Preston Blair Jr. of Missouri	84,559	46.59%	0	0.00%
Total			181,498	100.00%	9	100.00%

=== Results by county ===
County	Ulysses S. Grant Republican		Horatio Seymour Democratic		Margin	
County	%	#	%	#	%	#
Alamance	51.09%	1,102	48.91%	1,055	2.18%	47
Alexander	40.48%	351	59.52%	516	-19.03%	-165
Alleghany	46.31%	245	53.69%	284	-7.37%	-39
Anson	48.83%	1,002	51.17%	1,050	-2.34%	-48
Ashe	49.61%	634	50.39%	644	-0.78%	-10
Beaufort	51.79%	1,318	48.21%	1,227	3.58%	91
Bertie	66.83%	1,517	33.17%	753	33.66%	764
Bladen	55.98%	1,372	44.02%	1,079	11.95%	293
Brunswick	55.74%	879	44.26%	698	11.48%	181
Buncombe	48.71%	1,035	51.29%	1,090	-2.59%	-55
Burke	55.58%	927	44.42%	741	11.15%	186
Cabarrus	45.81%	940	54.19%	1,112	-8.38%	-172
Caldwell	39.09%	396	60.91%	617	-21.82%	-221
Camden	50.09%	530	49.91%	528	0.19%	2
Carteret	47.82%	823	52.18%	898	-4.36%	-75
Caswell	58.14%	1,957	41.86%	1,409	16.28%	548
Catawba	30.14%	488	69.86%	1,131	-39.72%	-643
Chatham	53.42%	1,765	46.58%	1,539	6.84%	226
Cherokee	51.15%	443	48.85%	423	2.31%	20
Chowan	57.02%	690	42.98%	520	14.05%	170
Clay	39.85%	155	60.15%	234	-20.31%	-79
Cleveland	38.75%	656	61.25%	1,037	-22.50%	-381
Columbus	34.45%	503	65.55%	957	-31.10%	-454
Craven	70.31%	3,535	29.69%	1,493	40.61%	2,042
Cumberland	48.66%	1,592	51.34%	1,680	-2.69%	-88
Currituck	31.44%	416	68.56%	907	-37.11%	-491
Davidson	68.82%	1,843	31.18%	835	37.64%	1,008
Davie	48.58%	652	51.42%	690	-2.83%	-38
Duplin	39.35%	1,025	60.65%	1,580	-21.31%	-555
Edgecombe	64.50%	2,676	35.50%	1,473	28.99%	1,203
Forsyth	61.57%	1,261	38.43%	787	23.14%	474
Franklin	50.98%	1,431	49.02%	1,376	1.96%	55
Gaston	56.43%	878	43.57%	678	12.85%	200
Gates	40.21%	452	59.79%	672	-19.57%	-220
Granville	56.18%	2,754	43.82%	2,148	12.36%	606
Greene	57.58%	756	42.42%	557	15.16%	199
Guilford	59.18%	2,169	40.82%	1,496	18.36%	673
Halifax	66.81%	3,206	33.19%	1,593	33.61%	1,613
Harnett	44.98%	645	55.02%	789	-10.04%	-144
Haywood	38.43%	412	61.57%	660	-23.13%	-248
Henderson	63.94%	640	36.06%	361	27.87%	279
Hertford	51.03%	744	48.97%	714	2.06%	30
Hyde	41.97%	572	58.03%	791	-16.07%	-219
Iredell	37.82%	859	62.18%	1,412	-24.35%	-553
Jackson	26.60%	220	73.40%	607	-46.80%	-387
Johnston	47.18%	1,204	52.82%	1,348	-5.64%	-144
Jones	58.38%	592	41.62%	422	16.77%	170
Lenoir	58.53%	1,215	41.47%	861	17.05%	354
Lincoln	45.85%	625	54.15%	738	-8.29%	-113
Macon	36.09%	323	63.91%	572	-27.82%	-249
Madison	53.60%	529	46.40%	458	7.19%	71
Martin	49.85%	1,021	50.15%	1,027	-0.29%	-6
McDowell	54.94%	740	45.06%	607	9.87%	133
Mecklenburg	47.73%	1,962	52.27%	2,149	-4.55%	-187
Mitchell	81.89%	529	18.11%	117	63.78%	412
Montgomery	68.07%	727	31.93%	341	36.14%	386
Moore	53.55%	1,019	46.45%	884	7.09%	135
Nash	43.30%	837	56.70%	1,096	-13.40%	-259
New Hanover	63.41%	3,968	36.59%	2,290	26.81%	1,678
Northampton	64.89%	1,931	35.11%	1,045	29.77%	886
Onslow	32.18%	417	67.82%	879	-35.65%	-462
Orange	43.24%	1,453	56.76%	1,907	-13.51%	-454
Pasquotank	63.96%	1,047	36.04%	590	27.92%	457
Perquimans	61.15%	913	38.85%	580	22.30%	333
Person	47.48%	953	52.52%	1,054	-5.03%	-101
Pitt	52.91%	1,752	47.09%	1,559	5.83%	193
Polk	67.50%	405	32.50%	195	35.00%	210
Randolph	66.64%	1,752	33.36%	877	33.28%	875
Richmond	60.81%	1,254	39.19%	808	21.63%	446
Robeson	49.64%	1,318	50.36%	1,337	-0.72%	-19
Rockingham	49.16%	1,463	50.84%	1,513	-1.68%	-50
Rowan	46.54%	1,332	53.46%	1,530	-6.92%	-198
Rutherford	65.12%	1,279	34.88%	685	30.24%	594
Sampson	41.49%	1,026	58.51%	1,447	-17.02%	-421
Stanly	41.72%	466	58.28%	651	-16.56%	-185
Stokes	51.28%	783	48.72%	744	2.55%	39
Surry	52.60%	818	47.40%	737	5.21%	81
Transylvania	44.50%	186	55.50%	232	-11.00%	-46
Tyrrell	36.52%	195	63.48%	339	-26.97%	-144
Union	46.58%	811	53.42%	930	-6.84%	-119
Wake	53.76%	3,433	46.24%	2,953	7.52%	480
Warren	68.67%	2,308	31.33%	1,053	37.34%	1,255
Washington	73.29%	955	26.71%	348	46.58%	607
Watauga	46.54%	303	53.46%	348	-6.91%	-45
Wayne	48.87%	1,421	51.13%	1,487	-2.27%	-66
Wilkes	59.51%	1,205	40.49%	820	19.01%	385
Wilson	44.85%	897	55.15%	1,103	-10.30%	-206
Yadkin	37.95%	266	62.05%	435	-24.11%	-169
Yancey	57.46%	840	42.54%	622	14.91%	218

== See also ==
- United States presidential elections in North Carolina
