= 1992–93 Eredivisie =

37th season of the Eredivisie

Eredivisie
- Season: 1992–93
- Champions: Feyenoord (13th title)
- Promoted: Go Ahead Eagles; Cambuur Leeuw. FC Den Bosch
- Relegated: Fortuna Sittard; FC Den Bosch; Dordrecht'90
- Champions League: Feyenoord
- Cup Winners' Cup: Ajax
- UEFA Cup: PSV; Vitesse Arnhem; FC Twente
- Goals: 899
- Average goals/game: 2.93
- Top goalscorer: (Netherlands) Dennis Bergkamp; Ajax 26 goals

The Dutch Eredivisie in the 1992–93 season was contested by 18 teams. Feyenoord won the championship.

== League standings ==
Pos	Team	Pld	W	D	L	GF	GA	GD	Pts	Qualification or relegation
1	Feyenoord (C)	34	22	9	3	82	32	+50	53	Qualification to Champions League first round
2	PSV	34	22	7	5	81	34	+47	51	Qualification to UEFA Cup first round
3	Ajax (Note: Winners of the KNVB Cup)	34	20	9	5	87	30	+57	49	Qualification to Cup Winners' Cup first round
4	Vitesse Arnhem	34	16	14	4	58	29	+29	46	Qualification to UEFA Cup first round
5	FC Twente	34	17	8	9	64	39	+25	42	Qualification to UEFA Cup first round
6	FC Volendam	34	12	13	9	51	34	+17	37	
7	MVV	34	15	7	12	49	47	+2	37	
8	FC Utrecht	34	12	11	11	44	40	+4	35	
9	RKC	34	12	9	13	49	57	−8	33	
10	Willem II	34	12	8	14	41	38	+3	32	
11	Roda JC	34	11	7	16	51	59	−8	29	
12	FC Groningen	34	9	11	14	31	49	−18	29	
13	Sparta	34	8	11	15	36	65	−29	27	
14	Cambuur Leeuwarden	34	6	13	15	39	58	−19	25	
15	Go Ahead Eagles	34	8	9	17	36	64	−28	25	
16	Fortuna Sittard (R)	34	7	7	20	34	76	−42	21	Qualification to Relegation play-offs
17	FC Den Bosch (R)	34	6	9	19	35	79	−44	21	Qualification to Relegation play-offs
18	Dordrecht'90 (R)	34	5	10	19	30	68	−38	20	Relegation to Eerste Divisie

Source: rsssf.com
(C) Champions; (R) Relegated

== Results ==
Home \ Away	AJA	DBO	CAM	DOR	FEY	FOR	GAE	GRO	MVV	PSV	RKC	RJC	SPA	TWE	UTR	VIT	VOL	WIL
Ajax	—	4–0	3–1	4–1	5–2	5–1	3–1	4–0	2–2	1–2	2–1	4–2	6–0	0–1	1–1	4–0	1–1	0–0
Den Bosch	2–2	—	3–2	2–0	1–5	1–2	0–1	0–2	4–1	2–2	1–3	4–3	1–1	2–0	2–0	0–0	0–5	0–3
Cambuur	1–3	2–1	—	5–0	0–1	1–3	1–1	0–0	0–4	0–1	0–2	1–1	0–0	4–2	1–2	1–3	0–0	3–1
Dordrecht '90	0–3	1–1	4–0	—	1–5	1–2	0–0	0–0	2–2	2–2	0–1	0–1	0–0	0–0	0–2	3–3	0–4	0–2
Feyenoord	0–3	5–0	3–1	3–0	—	4–1	4–2	3–1	3–4	1–1	4–1	3–0	2–2	1–1	0–0	2–2	2–0	3–0
Fortuna Sittard	1–4	1–1	1–1	0–2	0–1	—	3–1	1–1	1–1	1–5	4–1	1–1	1–0	0–2	1–1	1–2	0–0	0–1
Go Ahead Eagles	0–6	2–0	1–1	2–1	1–1	4–2	—	0–0	1–2	0–3	2–4	2–0	1–0	2–1	1–1	0–3	0–0	0–0
Groningen	0–3	1–1	0–1	3–0	0–5	2–1	2–1	—	2–1	0–1	2–2	0–0	1–2	1–1	2–1	0–1	2–1	1–1
MVV	1–1	2–1	1–3	1–0	0–2	5–0	3–0	1–0	—	1–5	1–1	2–1	0–2	2–0	0–3	1–0	0–1	2–0
PSV Eindhoven	2–1	7–0	3–0	4–1	1–1	5–0	2–0	3–0	2–1	—	0–3	2–0	3–1	6–2	3–1	1–0	2–2	1–1
RKC	0–5	4–2	2–2	0–3	1–2	1–3	2–1	1–2	0–3	0–3	—	1–4	4–0	2–1	2–4	0–0	2–3	0–0
Roda	1–3	4–1	3–2	1–3	1–2	4–1	4–0	4–2	0–0	2–0	1–1	—	1–2	2–2	1–3	0–2	1–0	2–0
Sparta Rotterdam	0–0	2–0	2–2	0–0	0–2	1–0	6–4	1–0	0–0	2–5	0–0	2–4	—	2–3	1–3	0–3	0–2	1–0
Twente	2–0	5–0	1–1	2–3	0–5	4–1	4–0	5–0	3–0	1–2	0–0	4–0	5–0	—	5–1	0–0	2–1	1–0
Utrecht	1–2	1–1	1–1	1–1	0–0	4–0	0–2	1–0	0–1	2–0	0–1	2–1	1–1	0–1	—	0–3	2–0	0–1
Vitesse	2–2	2–0	1–1	3–0	1–1	5–0	2–2	0–0	2–1	1–0	2–2	6–1	3–2	0–1	1–1	—	0–0	2–0
Volendam	0–0	3–0	0–0	4–1	1–2	2–0	1–0	1–3	1–2	3–1	0–2	0–0	3–3	1–1	2–2	1–1	—	5–1
Willem II	1–0	1–1	4–0	5–0	0–2	2–0	2–1	1–1	4–1	1–1	0–2	1–0	5–0	0–1	1–2	1–2	1–3	—

Legend: Blue = home team win; Yellow = draw; Red = away team win.

== Promotion/relegation play-offs ==
There was only one round in the promotion/relegation play-offs this year. Six entrants (four from the Eerste Divisie, two from this league) entered in two groups. The two group winners were promoted to (or remained in) the Eredivisie.

Group 1
Pos	Team	Pld	W	D	L	GF	GA	GD	Pts	Promotion or relegation
1	sc Heerenveen	4	3	0	1	7	4	+3	6	Promotion to Eredivisie
2	Fortuna Sittard	4	2	0	2	8	4	+4	4	Relegation to Eerste Divisie
3	NEC	4	1	0	3	4	11	−7	2	

Source: rsssf.com

Group 2
Pos	Team	Pld	W	D	L	GF	GA	GD	Pts	Promotion or relegation
1	NAC	4	4	0	0	11	1	+10	8	Promotion to Eredivisie
2	FC Den Bosch	4	1	0	3	4	7	−3	2	Relegation to Eerste Divisie
3	De Graafschap	4	1	0	3	3	12	−9	2	

Source: rsssf.com

== Attendances ==
No.	Club	Average	Change	Highest
1	PSV	25,306	5,4%	28,700
2	Feyenoord	23,374	32,4%	47,500
3	AFC Ajax	20,929	13,0%	43,000
4	FC Groningen	12,369	-13,2%	18,000
5	SC Cambuur	7,221	7,5%	13,500
6	FC Twente	7,218	24,6%	15,200
7	SBV Vitesse	7,127	14,5%	21,000
8	FC Utrecht	6,980	6,4%	16,636
9	MVV Maastricht	6,685	22,9%	11,500
10	Willem II	6,544	1,4%	11,600
11	Go Ahead Eagles	6,391	87,1%	12,603
12	Sparta Rotterdam	4,412	3,8%	13,000
13	FC Volendam	3,794	6,0%	9,000
14	Fortuna Sittard	3,641	-24,6%	9,000
15	Roda JC	3,494	-29,9%	7,000
16	FC Den Bosch	3,314	60,8%	10,500
17	RKC Waalwijk	3,229	-9,0%	6,498
18	Dordrecht '90	2,115	-3,4%	8,176

== See also ==
- 1992–93 Eerste Divisie
- 1992–93 KNVB Cup
