= 1993–94 Eerste Divisie =

38th season of the second-tier football league in Netherlands

Eerste Divisie
- Season: 1993–94
- Champions: Dordrecht '90
- Promoted: Dordrecht '90; NEC
- Goals: 903
- Average goals/game: 2.95
- Top goalscorer: 27 Virgil Breetveld (Dordrecht'90)
- Highest scoring: 7–4 (Dordrecht'90 vs ADO den Haag)

The Dutch Eerste Divisie in the 1993–94 season was contested by 18 teams. Dordrecht'90 won the championship. The play-off system was expanded this season: instead of two groups of three teams, four teams entered each group now. The two new members both came from this league.

== New entrants ==
Relegated from the Eredivisie 1992–93

- FC Den Bosch
- Dordrecht'90
- Fortuna Sittard

== League standings ==
| Pos | Team | Pld | W | D | L | GF | GA | GD | Pts | Promotion or qualification |
|---|---|---|---|---|---|---|---|---|---|---|
| 1 | Dordrecht'90 | 34 | 20 | 6 | 8 | 64 | 36 | +28 | 46 | Promotion to Eredivisie |
| 2 | NEC | 34 | 19 | 7 | 8 | 69 | 44 | +25 | 45 | Play-offs |
| 3 | AZ | 34 | 16 | 10 | 8 | 60 | 31 | +29 | 42 | Play-offs |
| 4 | SC Heracles | 34 | 16 | 9 | 9 | 68 | 37 | +31 | 41 | Play-offs |
| 5 | Telstar | 34 | 15 | 10 | 9 | 60 | 32 | +28 | 40 | Play-offs |
| 6 | De Graafschap | 34 | 13 | 12 | 9 | 45 | 37 | +8 | 38 | Play-offs |
| 7 | ADO Den Haag | 34 | 14 | 10 | 10 | 62 | 56 | +6 | 38 | Play-offs |
| 8 | FC Zwolle | 34 | 15 | 8 | 11 | 51 | 53 | −2 | 38 | |
| 9 | FC Emmen | 34 | 14 | 8 | 12 | 49 | 58 | −9 | 36 | |
| 10 | Fortuna Sittard | 34 | 11 | 11 | 12 | 36 | 36 | 0 | 33 | |
| 11 | FC Den Bosch | 34 | 12 | 9 | 13 | 55 | 57 | −2 | 33 | |
| 12 | Excelsior | 34 | 10 | 10 | 14 | 41 | 54 | −13 | 30 | |
| 13 | Helmond Sport | 34 | 9 | 12 | 13 | 35 | 51 | −16 | 30 | |
| 14 | RBC | 34 | 11 | 7 | 16 | 60 | 69 | −9 | 29 | |
| 15 | HFC Haarlem | 34 | 9 | 7 | 18 | 42 | 62 | −20 | 25 | |
| 16 | FC Eindhoven | 34 | 5 | 14 | 15 | 31 | 64 | −33 | 24 | |
| 17 | Veendam | 34 | 6 | 11 | 17 | 39 | 57 | −18 | 23 | |
| 18 | TOP Oss | 34 | 7 | 7 | 20 | 36 | 69 | −33 | 21 | |

Source: rsssf.com

== Promotion/relegation play-offs ==
In the promotion/relegation competition, eight entrants (six from this league and two from the Eredivisie) entered in two groups. The group winners were promoted to the Eredivisie.

Group 1
| Pos | Team | Pld | W | D | L | GF | GA | GD | Pts | Qualification |
|---|---|---|---|---|---|---|---|---|---|---|
| 1 | RKC Waalwijk | 6 | 3 | 1 | 2 | 14 | 7 | +7 | 7 | Remain in Eredivisie |
| 2 | Telstar | 6 | 3 | 0 | 3 | 9 | 11 | −2 | 6 | |
| 3 | ADO Den Haag | 6 | 3 | 0 | 3 | 5 | 12 | −7 | 6 | |
| 4 | AZ | 6 | 2 | 1 | 3 | 10 | 8 | +2 | 5 | |

Source: rsssf.com

Group 2
| Pos | Team | Pld | W | D | L | GF | GA | GD | Pts | Promotion or relegation |
|---|---|---|---|---|---|---|---|---|---|---|
| 1 | NEC | 6 | 6 | 0 | 0 | 14 | 5 | +9 | 12 | Promotion to Eredivisie |
| 2 | VVV-Venlo | 6 | 3 | 0 | 3 | 11 | 9 | +2 | 6 | Relegation from Eredivisie |
| 3 | SC Heracles | 6 | 2 | 0 | 4 | 8 | 12 | −4 | 4 | |
| 4 | De Graafschap | 5 | 1 | 0 | 4 | 10 | 17 | −7 | 2 | |

Source: rsssf.com

== Attendances ==
| # | Club | Average |
|---|---|---|
| 1 | AZ | 3,956 |
| 2 | De Graafschap | 3,276 |
| 3 | Zwolle | 2,802 |
| 4 | Telstar | 2,673 |
| 5 | Heracles | 2,569 |
| 6 | Helmond | 2,558 |
| 7 | Emmen | 2,426 |
| 8 | NEC | 2,339 |
| 9 | RBC | 2,300 |
| 10 | Veendam | 2,291 |
| 11 | Dordrecht | 2,276 |
| 12 | Eindhoven | 1,982 |
| 13 | Oss | 1,923 |
| 14 | Den Bosch | 1,651 |
| 15 | ADO | 1,613 |
| 16 | Fortuna | 1,609 |
| 17 | Haarlem | 1,572 |
| 18 | Excelsior | 1,347 |

== See also ==
- Eredivisie 1993–94
- KNVB Cup 1993–94
