= Kees Aarts =

Dutch political scientist

Cornelis Wilhelmus Maria Antonia (Kees) Aarts (born 24 May 1959) is a Dutch political scientist and Professor of Political Science at the Department of Public Administration (PA) of the University of Twente, particularly known for his work on comparative electoral behavior.

== Biography ==
Born in 's-Hertogenbosch, Aarts studied political science at the University of Amsterdam from 1977 to 1985, and received his PhD in 1990 at the University of Twente with a thesis entitled "Bodemverontreiniging en collectieve actie" (Soil pollution and collective action).

In 1985 Aarts started as academic career as assistant professor at the University of Twente, where in 2005 he was appointed Professor of Political Science. Aarts also participates in the Netherlands Institute for Advanced Study (NIAS), the Netherlands Institute of Government (NIG) and the Netherlands Organisation for Business Economics and Management (NOBEM), and was elected member of the Royal Netherlands Academy of Arts and Sciences in 2011.

His work focusses on the area of electoral and methodological research. He is also responsible for the National Election Studies and is currently Chairman of the Netherlands Electoral Research Foundation.

== Selected publications ==
- Aarts, Cornelis WAM. Bodemverontreiniging en collectieve actie. PhD Thesis, University of Twente, 1990.
- Aarts, K., Huib Pellikaan, and Robert J. Van der Veen. Sociale dilemma's in het milieubeleid : een perspectief op de motieven, voorkeuren, intenties en het gedrag van burgers. Amsterdam : Het Spinhuis, 1995.
- Aarts, K., Jacques Thomassen and Henk van der Kolk (eds.). Politieke veranderingen in Nederland 1971-1998 : kiezers en de smalle marges van de politiek. With Den Haag : Sdu Uitgevers, 2000.
- Aarts, K. and Henk van der Kolk (eds.). Nederlanders en Europa : het referendum over de Europese grondwet. With . Amsterdam : Bakker, 2005.

Articles, a selection:

- Aarts, Kees; Semetko, Holli A. (1999). "Representation and responsibility: the 1998 Dutch election in perspective". Acta Politica. 34 (2): 111–129.
- Aarts, Kees; Semetko, Holli A. (August 2003). "The divided electorate: media use and political involvement" (PDF). Journal of Politics. 65 (3): 759–784. doi:10.1111/1468-2508.00211. JSTOR 10.1111/1468-2508.00211.
