= Andrew Reynolds (political scientist) =

British political scientist

Andrew Stephen Reynolds (born 21 May 1967) is an author and was professor of political science at University of North Carolina. Reynolds is a specialist in democratization, electoral system design, constitutional design, minority rights and ethnic conflict.

He graduated with a degree in political science from University of East Anglia in 1989, an MA in South African politics from University of Cape Town in 1992, and a PhD in Political Science from University of California, San Diego in 1996. He taught at University of Notre Dame from 1997–2001 and at Chapel Hill from 2001 to 2020; between 2008 and 2013 he was the chair of the global studies curriculum there.

Since 1995 he has undertaken advising missions to over twenty countries and been an expert consultant for half a dozen others. He was an adviser to the Sudan People's Liberation Movement in the Sudan Comprehensive Peace Agreement talks (2003–2005), the Afghan Wolesi Jirga (2003–2007), the Libyan National Transitional Council (2011) and a number of Egyptian political parties (2011). His missions have been sponsored by the United Nations, the International Institute for Democracy and Electoral Assistance (IDEA), the UK Department for International Development, the US State Department, the National Democratic Institute, the International Republican Institute, the Organization for Security and Cooperation in Europe (OSCE) and the International Foundation for Election Systems.

He has published opinion pieces in the New York Times, Washington Post, and other papers. He also and sits on the editorial board of the academic journal Representation. His work has been translated into multiple languages: French, Spanish, Arabic, Serbo-Croat, Albanian, Burmese, and Portuguese.

His opinion piece in the North Carolina newspaper News and Observer on research from the Electoral Integrity Project, on whose International Advisory Board Reynolds sits, received attention when it declared his home state of North Carolina could "no longer considered to be a fully functioning democracy" with 12 other U.S. states scoring as poorly. Andrew Gelman, a Columbia University statistician, subsequently criticized Reynolds's op-ed and the statistical basis of the EIP's ratings.

== Books ==
- Reynolds, Andrew (1994). Election '94 South Africa: the campaigns, results and future prospects. New York: David Philip St. Martin's Press. ISBN 9780864862761.
- Reynolds, Andrew; Reilly, Andrew (1997). Electoral system design: the new international IDEA handbook (volume 1). Stockholm, Sweden: International Institute for Democracy and Electoral Assistance (IDEA).
- Reynolds, Andrew; Sisk, Timothy, eds. (1998). Elections and conflict management in Africa. Washington, DC: United States Institute of Peace Press (USIP). ISBN 978-1878379795.
- Reynolds, Andrew, ed. (1999). Election '99 South Africa: from Mandela to Mbeki. New York: St. Martin's Press. ISBN 978-0312228712.
- Reynolds, Andrew (1999). Electoral systems and democratization in Southern Africa. Oxford New York: Oxford University Press. ISBN 9780198295105.
- Reynolds, Andrew, ed. (2002). The architecture of democracy: constitutional design, conflict management, and democracy. Oxford, UK New York: Oxford University Press. ISBN 978-0199246465.
- Reynolds, Andrew; Reilly, Ben; Ellis, Andrew (2005). Electoral system design: the new international IDEA handbook. Stockholm, Sweden: International Institute for Democracy and Electoral Assistance (IDEA). ISBN 9789185391189.
- Reynolds, Andrew (2011). Designing democracy in a dangerous world. Oxford: Oxford University Press. ISBN 9780199594481.
- Brownlee, Jason; Masoud, Tarek; Reynolds, Andrew (2015). The Arab Spring: Pathways of Repression and Reform. Oxford: Oxford University Press.
