= Harry van der Laan =

Dutch footballer

Personal information
- Full name: Harry van der Laan
- Date of birth: 24 February 1964 (age 62)
- Place of birth: Gouda, Netherlands
- Height: 1.73 m (5 ft 8 in)
- Position: Striker

Youth career
- VV ONA'53
- GCFC Olympia
- RVC'33

Senior career*
Years	Team	Apps	(Gls)
1988–1990	FC Den Haag	61	(34)
1990–1991	Feyenoord	22	(9)
1991–1995	ADO Den Haag	112	(70)
1995–1996	Dordrecht'90	31	(20)
1996–1998	Cambuur	50	(36)
1998–2000	Den Bosch	76	(39)
2000–????	Viterbese Calcio	?	(?)

International career
	Netherlands	0	(0)
- * Club domestic league appearances and goals

Harry van der Laan (born 24 February 1964) is a retired Dutch football striker. He made his professional debut in the 1988–89 season for FC Den Haag. Later on he played for Feyenoord, ADO Den Haag, Dordrecht'90, SC Cambuur, FC Den Bosch, and Viterbese Calcio (Italy).
