= Dennis Iliohan =

Dutch footballer (born 1972)

Personal information
- Date of birth: 11 January 1972 (age 54)
- Place of birth: Amsterdam, Netherlands
- Position: Striker

Youth career
- 1988–1990: Haarlem

Senior career*
Years	Team	Apps	(Gls)
1990–1993	Haarlem	55	(2)
1993–1994	Animo	?	(?)
1994–1996	Lisse	?	(?)
1996–2001	ADO Den Haag	113	(31)
2001	→ Stabæk (loan)	3	(1)
2001–2002	Emmen	29	(9)
2002–2005	TOP Oss	37	(5)
2005–2007	Lisse		
- * Club domestic league appearances and goals

Dennis Iliohan (born 11 January 1972) is a Dutch former professional footballer who played as a striker. He mainly played for ADO Den Haag but also had stints at other Dutch clubs as well as Norwegian side Stabæk.

== Career ==
Born in Amsterdam, Iliohan began his career with HFC Haarlem but left in 1993. He then began playing for amateur club AVV Animo in the seventh-tier Tweede Klasse. After one season, he was signed by Lisse manager Mark Wotte, who later brought Iliohan with him to ADO Den Haag in August 1996. Towards the end of his spell with ADO, in which he scored 31 goals in 113 appearances, he was sent on loan to Norwegian club Stabæk in 2000. On 1 August 2001, Iliohan signed a one-year contract with Eerste Divisie club Emmen after a trial. He had previously trialled with Swedish club IF Elfsborg and Cypriot side Enosis Neon Paralimni without success. He would later move to TOP Oss, before finishing his career with Lisse.

== Personal life ==
Iliohan has a son, Bryan, who has also played for the FC Lisse senior team.

After his playing career, Iliohan started his own designing agency named ilio reclame headquartered in Hillegom. In August 2020, he started a new company named Mixed Media Reklame.
