= Elections in Ohio =

United States presidential election results for Ohio
Year	Republican / Whig		Democratic		Third party(ies)	
Year	No.	%	No.	%	No.	%
1824	12,280	24.55%	18,489	36.96%	19,255	38.49%
1828	63,396	48.40%	67,597	51.60%	0	0.00%
1832	76,539	48.35%	81,246	51.33%	509	0.32%
1836	104,958	51.87%	96,238	47.56%	1,137	0.56%
1840	148,157	54.10%	124,782	45.57%	903	0.33%
1844	155,113	49.68%	149,061	47.74%	8,050	2.58%
1848	138,359	42.12%	154,773	47.12%	35,347	10.76%
1852	152,523	43.18%	168,933	47.83%	31,732	8.98%
1856	187,497	48.51%	170,874	44.21%	28,126	7.28%
1860	221,809	51.24%	187,421	43.30%	23,632	5.46%
1864	265,654	56.37%	205,599	43.63%	0	0.00%
1868	280,167	54.00%	238,621	46.00%	0	0.00%
1872	281,852	53.24%	244,321	46.15%	3,263	0.62%
1876	330,698	50.21%	323,182	49.07%	4,769	0.72%
1880	375,048	51.73%	340,821	47.01%	9,098	1.25%
1884	400,082	50.99%	368,280	46.94%	16,248	2.07%
1888	416,054	49.51%	396,455	47.18%	27,852	3.31%
1892	405,187	47.66%	404,115	47.53%	40,862	4.81%
1896	525,991	51.86%	477,497	47.08%	10,807	1.07%
1900	543,918	52.30%	474,882	45.66%	21,273	2.05%
1904	600,095	59.75%	344,674	34.32%	59,624	5.94%
1908	572,312	51.03%	502,721	44.82%	46,519	4.15%
1912	278,168	26.82%	424,834	40.96%	334,092	32.21%
1916	514,753	44.18%	604,161	51.86%	46,172	3.96%
1920	1,182,022	58.47%	780,037	38.58%	59,594	2.95%
1924	1,176,130	58.33%	477,888	23.70%	362,219	17.97%
1928	1,627,546	64.89%	864,210	34.45%	16,590	0.66%
1932	1,227,319	47.03%	1,301,695	49.88%	80,714	3.09%
1936	1,127,855	37.44%	1,747,140	57.99%	137,594	4.57%
1940	1,586,773	47.80%	1,733,139	52.20%	0	0.00%
1944	1,582,293	50.18%	1,570,763	49.82%	0	0.00%
1948	1,445,684	49.24%	1,452,791	49.48%	37,596	1.28%
1952	2,100,391	56.76%	1,600,367	43.24%	0	0.00%
1956	2,262,610	61.11%	1,439,655	38.89%	0	0.00%
1960	2,217,611	53.28%	1,944,248	46.72%	0	0.00%
1964	1,470,865	37.06%	2,498,331	62.94%	0	0.00%
1968	1,791,014	45.23%	1,700,586	42.95%	468,098	11.82%
1972	2,441,827	59.63%	1,558,889	38.07%	94,071	2.30%
1976	2,000,505	48.65%	2,011,621	48.92%	99,747	2.43%
1980	2,206,545	51.51%	1,752,414	40.91%	324,644	7.58%
1984	2,678,560	58.90%	1,825,440	40.14%	43,619	0.96%
1988	2,416,549	55.00%	1,939,629	44.15%	37,521	0.85%
1992	1,894,310	38.35%	1,984,942	40.18%	1,060,712	21.47%
1996	1,859,883	41.02%	2,148,222	47.38%	526,329	11.61%
2000	2,351,209	49.97%	2,186,190	46.46%	168,058	3.57%
2004	2,859,768	50.81%	2,741,167	48.71%	26,973	0.48%
2008	2,677,820	46.80%	2,940,044	51.38%	103,967	1.82%
2012	2,661,437	47.60%	2,827,709	50.58%	101,788	1.82%
2016	2,841,006	51.31%	2,394,169	43.24%	301,372	5.44%
2020	3,154,834	53.18%	2,679,165	45.16%	98,447	1.66%
2024	3,180,122	54.82%	2,533,703	43.68%	86,866	1.50%

Elections in Ohio are held on a county, state, and federal level. The Republicans are strongest in the rural Northwest, the affluent Cincinnati and Columbus suburbs, and have made gains in Appalachian Southeast Ohio and the industrial, working-class Northeast in the 21st century. The Democrats rely on the state's major cities, and have made gains in educated suburban areas in recent years. In recent years, Ohio has trended Republican and is considered a reliable state for Republicans, which currently hold all state and Senate seats as well hold a majority in the congressional delegate.

The state was strongly Republican from the party's inception, as it voted Republican in every election from 1856 to 1908. The northern Union-aligned part of the state kept the state Republican, and consistently narrowed edged out the Democratic and Appalachia-influenced southern Ohio. From 1896 till 2020, however, Ohio has voted for the winning candidate, except for Franklin D Roosevelt in 1944, John F Kennedy in 1960, and Joe Biden in 2020. This was due to Democratic gains in the northeastern part of the state. The state has not backed a losing candidate in consecutive elections since 1848. Due to a close split in party registration, it has been a key battleground state. No Republican has ever been elected president without winning Ohio. In 2004, Ohio was the tipping point state, as Bush won the state with 51% of the vote, giving him its 20 electoral votes and the margin he needed in the Electoral College for re-election. The state was closely contested in 2008 and 2012, with Barack Obama winning narrowly on both occasions. Ohio has been a bellwether state in presidential elections.

Since 2016, Ohio's bellwether status has been questioned given that Donald Trump won it by 8 points, the largest margin for each party since 1988, and then won the state by a similar margin in 2020 despite losing nationwide and won it by double digit margin in 2024.

In a 2020 study, Ohio was ranked as the 17th hardest state for citizens to vote in.

== Federal elections ==
- House: 1964, 2006, 2008, 2010, 2012, 2014, 2016, 2018, 2020, 2022, 2024
- Senate: 1964, 2006, 2010, 2012, 2016, 2018, 2022, 2024
- Presidential primary: 2008 Democratic 2008 Republican 2012 Republican 2016 Democratic 2016 Republican 2020 Democratic 2020 Republican 2024 Democratic 2024 Republican

== State elections ==
- Ohio Attorney General elections
- Ohio State Auditor elections
- Ohio gubernatorial elections
- Ohio lieutenant gubernatorial elections
- Ohio Secretary of State elections
- Ohio Supreme Court elections
- Ohio State Treasurer elections

== Local elections ==
- City Council of Cincinnati, Ohio elections
- City Commission of Dayton, Ohio elections
- Politics of Dayton, Ohio
- Montgomery County, Ohio elections

== Election security ==
In the leadup to the 2020 Ohio elections, by February 2020, eight Ohio counties had failed to complete an election security checklist required by Ohio's top election official. One county, Van Wert County Board of Elections, was placed on administrative oversight because it provided no plan for complying with the directive.

== See also ==
- 2026 Ohio elections
- Ohio Ballot Board
- Political party strength in Ohio
- Golden Week (Ohio)
- United States presidential elections in Ohio
- Women's suffrage in Ohio
