= 1808 United States presidential election in Ohio =

- November 4, 1808
- Turnout: 14.2% ▼0.7 pp
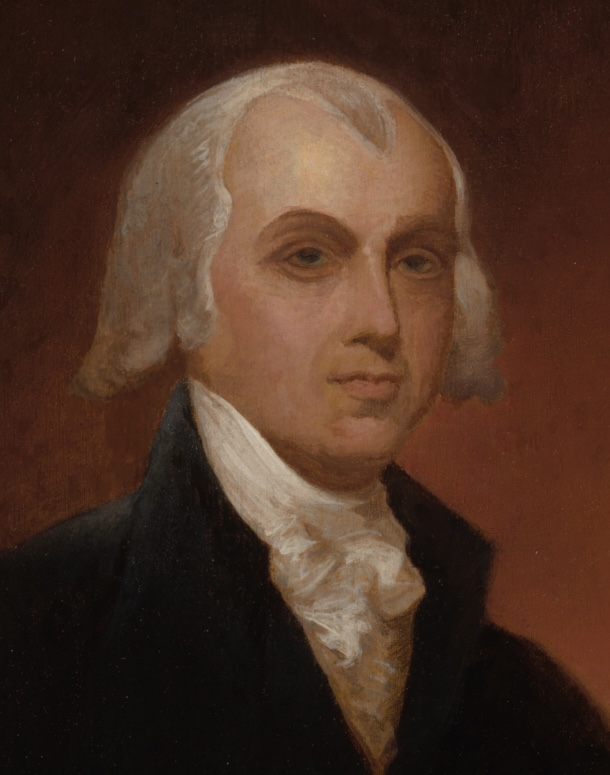

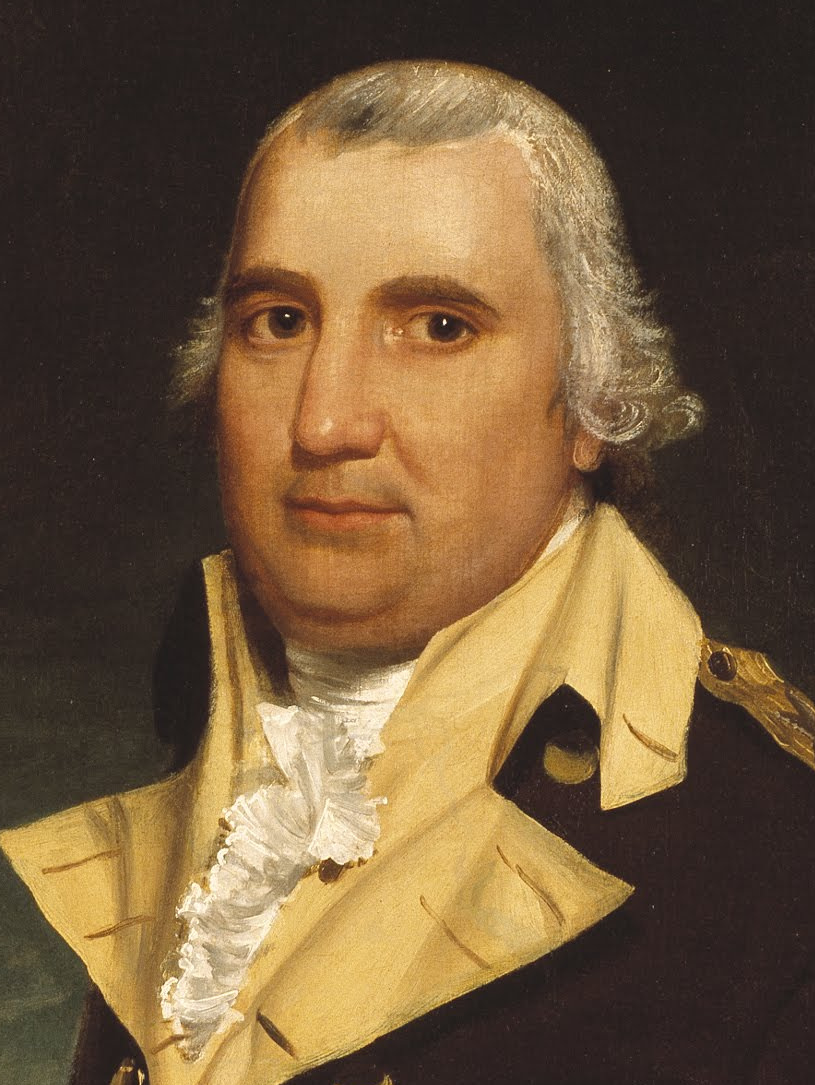

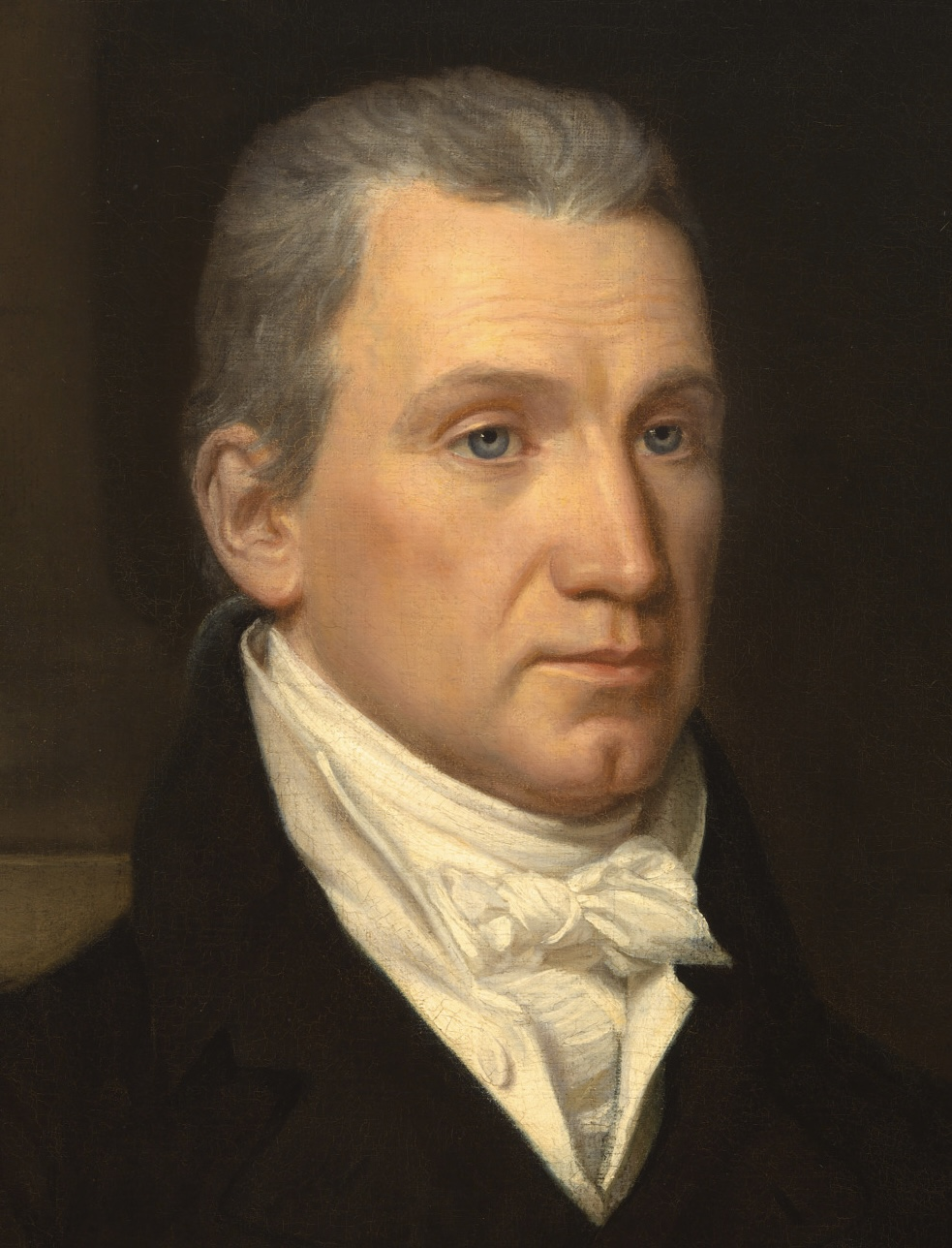
| Nominee | James Madison | Charles Cotesworth Pinckney | James Monroe |
| Party | Democratic-Republican | Federalist | Quids |
| Home state | Virginia | South Carolina | Virginia |
| Running mate | John Langdon | Rufus King | N/A |
| Electoral vote | 3 | 0 | 0 |
| Popular vote | 3,331 | 1,174 | 411 |
| Percentage | 67.8% | 23.9% | 8.4% |
- County results Madison: 50–60% 60–70% No data
President before election
Thomas Jefferson
Democratic-Republican
Elected President
James Madison
Democratic-Republican

A presidential election was held in Ohio on November 4, 1808, as part of the 1808 United States presidential election. The Democratic-Republican Party's ticket of secretary of state James Madison and New Hampshire governor John Langdon defeated the Federalist Party's ticket of former minister to France Charles Cotesworth Pinckney and former minister to the United Kingdom Rufus King. Quid former minister to the United Kingdom James Monroe finished third.

Thomas Jefferson won the 1804 United States presidential election in Ohio, defeating the Federalist unpledged electors by a majority of seven to one. Jefferson's retirement in 1808 precipitated a three-way contest for the Democratic-Republican nomination between Madison, vice president George Clinton, and Monroe. Madison prevailed in the party's congressional nominating caucus, but both rivals did not immediately withdraw from the race. Some Federalists suggested the party should adopt either Clinton or Monroe as its presidential candidate, but a secretive gathering of delegates in New York City nominated Pinckney.

Ohio Democratic-Republicans overwhelmingly supported Madison's candidacy, but split over control of the state party. Factionalism in the Ohio General Assembly foiled the initial attempts by the Democratic-Republican legislators to nominate electors. Party leaders eventually agreed on a state ticket, but lingering confusion and factional divisions produced several alternative candidates, particularly in the Western Reserve. The uncertainty surrounding the Democratic-Republican nominations fueled fears that vote splitting would hand the election to the Federalists or to the Quids.

The Federalists were energized following the 1808 Ohio gubernatorial election, but had little chance to carry the state against a united Democratic-Republican Party. Most Federalists supported the electors nominated by the Federalist Party in Washington County, Ohio; in hopes of attracting votes from Clinton's supporters, tickets circulated by the party did not list a presidential nominee. The Quids hoped to exploit the confusion created by the nomination process, but Madison's popularity hindered the efforts to swing the state's electoral votes to Monroe. Meanwhile, Clinton's ongoing dalliance with the Federalists caused Langdon to replace Clinton as Madison's running mate in Ohio.

Madison carried the state handily, winning Cincinnati and closely matching Jefferson's margins in counties with surviving returns. Although the Federalists were able to capitalize on low voter turnout to improve their margins in some counties, lack of interest in the presidential election reflected confidence in Madison's eventual victory. Despite the presence of a separate Quid ticket and the Federalist effort to sway disgruntled Clinton supporters, virtually all Ohio Democratic-Republicans voted for Madison.

== General election ==
=== Summary ===
Ohio chose three electors on a statewide general ticket. Nineteenth-century presidential elections used a form of block voting that allowed voters to modify the electoral list nominated by a political party before submitting their ballots. Because voters elected each member of the Electoral College individually, electors nominated by the same party frequently received differing numbers of votes as a consequence of voter rolloff, split-ticket voting, or electoral fusion. Despite the confusing array of candidates, Donald J. Ratcliffe notes evidence of straight-ticket voting in counties with surviving returns.

Multiple tickets backed by each party circulated during the campaign. The Democratic-Republicans nominated three electors pledged to Madison who received between 3,645 and 3,307 votes. Most Federalists voted for the electors nominated by the Washington County Federalist Party, which included two Federalists (Rufus Putnam and William Cortenus Schenck) and one candidate (Elijah Wadsworth) sometimes identified as a Quid. A second Federalist ticket including Putnam, Schenck, and Bezaleel Wells received votes in some counties. Quid John Bigger received 411 votes on a ticket that also included Wadsworth and one of the Madison electors (Nathaniel Massie). The following table compares the votes for the leading electors running exclusively on each ticket to give an approximate sense of the statewide popular vote.

1808 United States presidential election in Ohio
| Party | Candidate | Votes | % | ±% |
|---|---|---|---|---|
| Democratic-Republican | James Madison John Langdon | 3,331 | 67.76 | ▼19.93 |
| Federalist | Charles Cotesworth Pinckney Rufus King | 1,174 | 23.88 | ▲11.57 |
| Quids | James Monroe N/A | 411 | 8.36 | ▲8.36 |
| Total votes | | 4,916 | 100.00 | |

=== Results ===
1808 United States presidential election in Ohio
| Party | Candidate | Votes |
|---|---|---|
| Democratic-Republican | Nathaniel Massie (Note: Massie, a Democratic-Republican, received additional votes as part of the Quid ticket.) | 3,645 |
| Democratic-Republican | Stephen Wood | 3,331 |
| Democratic-Republican | Thomas MacCune | 3,307 |
| Federalist | Rufus Putnam | 1,174 |
| Quids | Elijah Wadsworth (Note: Wadsworth, a Quid, received additional votes as part of the Federalist ticket.) | 1,174 |
| Federalist | Bezaleel Wells | 1,057 |
| Federalist | William Cortenus Schenck | 1,031 |
| Quids | John Bigger | 411 |
| Total votes | | 4,916 |

=== Results by county ===
The following table compares the votes for the leading electors running exclusively on each ticket in each county with surviving returns.

1808 United States presidential election in Ohio by county
| County | James Madison Democratic-Republican | | Charles C. Pinckney Federalist | | James Monroe Quids | | Margin | | Total |
| County | Votes | % | Votes | % | Votes | % | Votes | % | Total |
|---|---|---|---|---|---|---|---|---|---|
| Adams | ** | | ** | | ** | | ** | | ** |
| Athens | ** | | ** | | ** | | ** | | ** |
| Belmont | ** | | ** | | ** | | ** | | ** |
| Butler | ** | | ** | | ** | | ** | | ** |
| Champaign | ** | | ** | | ** | | ** | | ** |
| Clermont | ** | | ** | | ** | | ** | | ** |
| Columbiana | ** | | ** | | ** | | 15 | ** | ** |
| Delaware | ** | | ** | | ** | | ** | | ** |
| Fairfield | ** | | ** | | ** | | ** | | ** |
| Franklin | ** | | ** | | ** | | ** | | ** |
| Gallia | ** | | ** | | ** | | ** | | ** |
| Geauga | ** | | ** | | ** | | ** | | ** |
| Greene | ** | | ** | | ** | | ** | | ** |
| Hamilton | 149 | 69.95 | 64 | 30.05 | — | | 85 | 39.91 | 213 |
| Highland | ** | | ** | | ** | | ** | | ** |
| Jefferson | ** | | ** | | ** | | ** | | ** |
| Knox | ** | | ** | | ** | | ** | | ** |
| Miami | ** | | ** | | ** | | ** | | ** |
| Montgomery | ** | | ** | | ** | | ** | | ** |
| Muskingum | ** | | ** | | ** | | ** | | ** |
| Portage | ** | | ** | | ** | | ** | | ** |
| Preble | ** | | ** | | ** | | ** | | ** |
| Ross | ** | | ** | | ** | | ** | | ** |
| Scioto | ** | | ** | | ** | | ** | | ** |
| Trumbull | ** | | ** | | ** | | ** | | ** |
| Warren | ** | | ** | | ** | | ** | | ** |
| Washington | 130 | 59.36 | 89 | 40.64 | — | | 41 | 18.72 | 219 |
| TOTAL | 279 | 64.58 | 153 | 35.42 | 0 | 0.00 | 126 | 29.17 | 432 |

== See also ==
- United States presidential elections in Ohio

== Bibliography ==
- Brent, Elbert Jay, ed. (1915). "Letters from the Samuel Huntington Correspondence, 1800–1812". Annual Reports of the Western Reserve Historical Society. Cleveland: Western Reserve Historical Society.
- Brant, Irving (2002). "Election of 1808". In Schlesinger, Arthur M. Jr.; Israel, Fred L. (eds.). History of American Presidential Elections, 1789–2001. Vol. 1. Philadelphia: Chelsea House Publishers. pp. 185–246.
- Lampi, Philip J. (n.d.). "Electoral College". A New Nation Votes. American Antiquarian Society.
- Lampi, Philip J. (2012). "Ohio 1808 Electoral College". A New Nation Votes. American Antiquarian Society.
- Ratcliffe, Donald J. (1998). Party Spirit in a Frontier Republic: Democratic Politics in Ohio, 1793–1821. Columbus: Ohio State University Press.
- Ratcliffe, Donald J. (Spring 2014). "Popular Preferences in the Presidential Election of 1824". Journal of the Early Republic. 34 (1): 45–77. JSTOR 24486931.
- Ratcliffe, Donald J. (Autumn 1987). "Voter Turnout in Early Ohio". Journal of the Early Republic. 7 (3): 223–51. JSTOR 3123782.
