= 1840 United States presidential election in Ohio =

- October 30, 1840
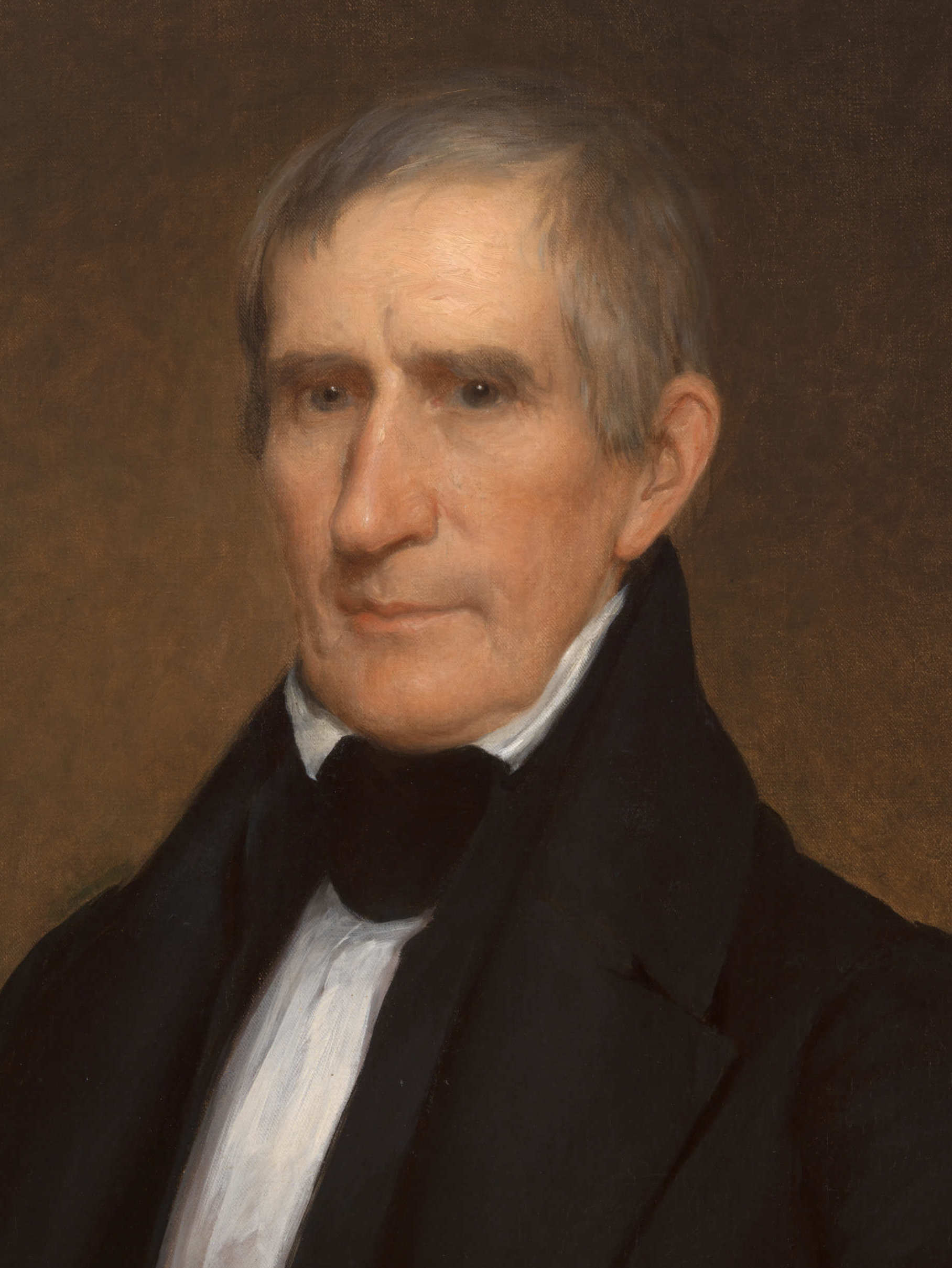

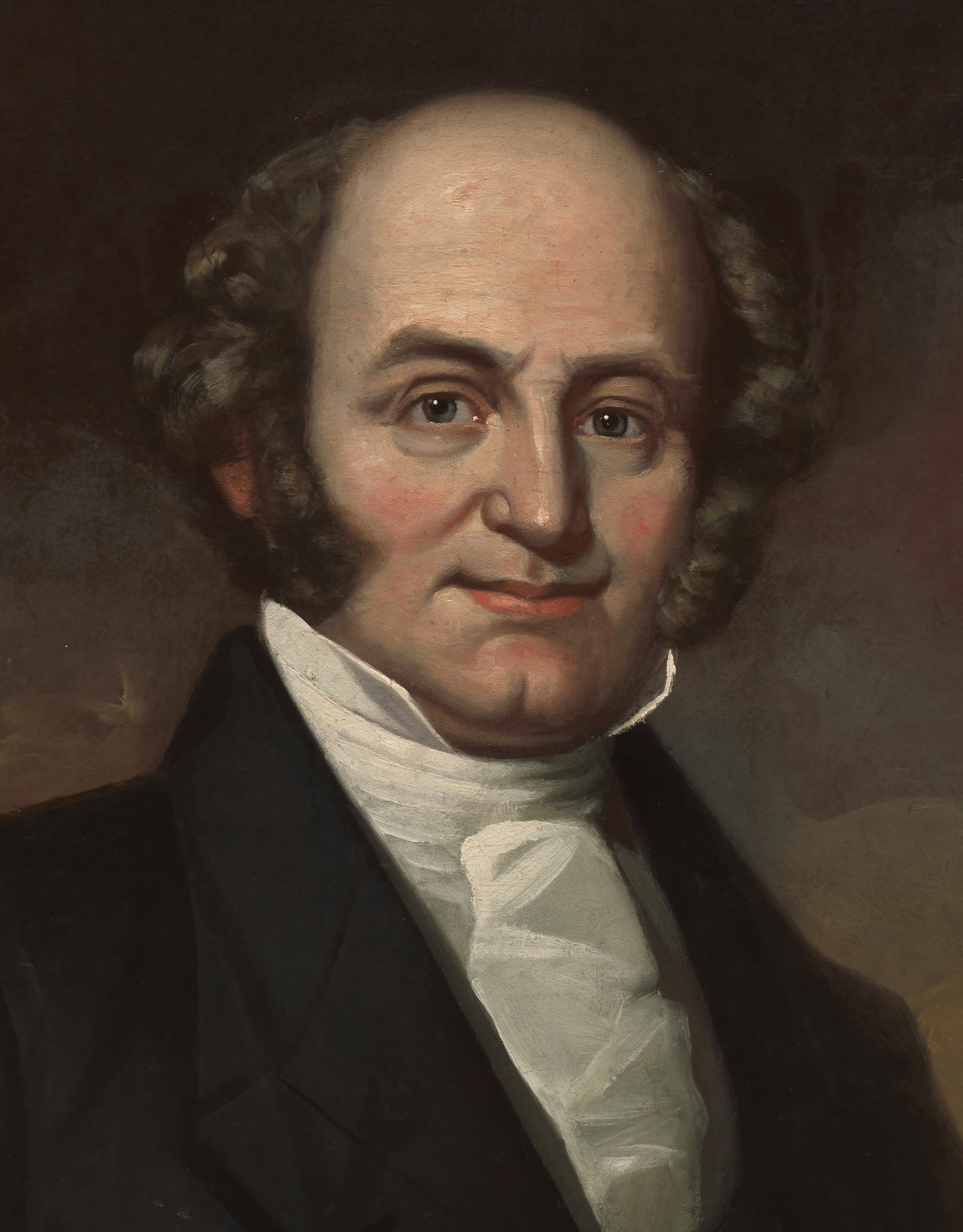
Nominee	William Henry Harrison	Martin Van Buren
Party	Whig	Democratic
Home state	Ohio	New York
Running mate	John Tyler	none
Electoral vote	21	0
Popular vote	148,157	124,782
Percentage	54.10%	45.57%

Harrison
40–50%
50–60%
60–70%
70–80%
Van Buren
50–60%
60–70%
70–80%
President before election
Martin Van Buren
Democratic
Elected President
William Henry Harrison
Whig

A presidential election was held in Ohio on October 30, 1840 as part of the 1840 United States presidential election. Voters chose 21 representatives, or electors to the Electoral College, who voted for President and Vice President.

Ohio voted for the Whig candidate, William Henry Harrison, over Democratic candidate Martin Van Buren. Harrison won Ohio by a margin of 8.53%. Ohio was the home state of William Henry Harrison, Harrison improved his margin of victory from the last election over Van Buren by +4.22%

== Results ==
1840 United States presidential election in Ohio
Party	Candidate	Running mate	Popular vote		Electoral vote	
Party	Candidate	Running mate	Count	%	Count	%
Whig	William Henry Harrison of Ohio	John Tyler of Virginia	148,157	54.10%	21	100.00%
Democratic	Martin Van Buren of New York	Richard Mentor Johnson of Kentucky	124,782	45.57%	0	0.00%
Liberty	James G. Birney of New York	Thomas Earle of Pennsylvania	903	0.33%	0	0.00%
Total			273,842	100.00%	21	100.00%

== See also ==
- United States presidential elections in Ohio
