= United States presidential elections in Ohio =

Presidential elections in Ohio
- Number of elections: 56
- Voted Democratic: 16
- Voted Republican: 31
- Voted Whig: 3
- Voted Democratic-Republican: 6
- Voted other: 0
- Voted for winning candidate: 46
- Voted for losing candidate: 10

Following is a table of United States presidential elections in Ohio, ordered by year. Since its admission to statehood in 1803, Ohio has participated in every U.S. presidential election. No republican candidate has ever won the presidency without winning Ohio.

Since 2016, Ohio is considered as a Republican leaning state. For most of its statehood from the Twentieth century on, Ohio has been considered a swing state, being won by either the Democratic or Republican candidates from election to election. As a swing state, Ohio was usually targeted by both major-party campaigns, especially in competitive elections. Pivotal in the election of 1888, Ohio was a regular swing state from 1980 until 2016.

Additionally, Ohio was previously considered a bellwether. Historian R. Douglas Hurt asserts that not since Virginia "had a state made such a mark on national political affairs". The Economist notes that "This slice of the mid-west contains a bit of everything American—part north-eastern and part southern, part urban and part rural, part hardscrabble poverty and part booming suburb". In the time since the Revolutionary War, Ohio has had ten misses (eight Democratic winners, one Democratic-Republican winner and one Whig winner) in the presidential election (John Quincy Adams in 1824, Martin Van Buren in 1836, James Polk in 1844, Zachary Taylor in 1848, James Buchanan in 1856, Grover Cleveland in 1884 and 1892, Franklin D. Roosevelt in 1944, John F. Kennedy in 1960, and Joe Biden in 2020), and prior to the 2020 election it also had the longest consistent perfect streak of any state, voting for the winning presidential candidate in each election from 1964 to 2016 — a streak that ended when Joe Biden won in 2020. No Republican has ever won the presidency without winning Ohio, and since the advent of the duopoly two-party system, Democrats have won the presidency without winning Ohio only eight times, in the elections noted above.

Winners of the state are in bold.

Party abbreviations:

- D = Democratic
- R = Republican
- D-R = Democratic-Republican
- Fed. = Federalist
- Prog. = Progressive (three distinct parties in 1912, 1924 and 1948, respectively)
- Am. Ind. = American Independent Party (1968)
- States' Rights D = States' Rights Democrats ("Dixiecrats") of 1948
- Lib. R = Liberal Republican Party ("Mugwumps") in 1872
- Const'l Union = Constitutional Union Party (1860)
- N. Dem = Northern Democratic Party (1860)
- S. Dem = Southern Democratic Party (1860)
- Nat'l R = National Republican Party (1828 & 1832, later merging into the Whig Party).

== Elections from 1864 to present ==
View source data.

Year	Winner (nationally)	Votes	Percent	Runner-up (nationally)	Votes	Percent	Other national candidates (Note: For purposes of these lists, other national candidates are defined as those who won at least one electoral vote, or won at least ten percent of the vote in multiple states.)	Votes	Percent	Electoral votes	Notes
**2024**	**Donald Trump** (R)	3,116,579	55.21	Kamala Harris (D)	2,476,003	43.86				17	
**2020**	Joe Biden (D)	2,679,165	45.24	**Donald Trump** (R)	3,154,834	53.27	—			18	
**2016 ***	**Donald Trump** (R)	2,841,006	51.31	Hillary Clinton (D)	2,394,169	43.24	—			18	* Clinton (D) won national popular vote 48.0% to 45.9%
**2012**	**Barack Obama** (D)	2,827,710	50.67	Mitt Romney (R)	2,661,433	47.69	—			18	
**2008**	**Barack Obama** (D)	2,940,044	51.50	John McCain (R)	2,677,820	46.91	—			20	
**2004**	**George W. Bush** (R)	2,859,768	50.81	John Kerry (D)	2,741,167	48.71	—			20	
**2000 ***	**George W. Bush** (R)	2,351,209	49.97	Al Gore (D)	2,186,190	46.46	—			21	* Gore (D) won national popular vote, 48.4% to 47.9%
**1996**	**Bill Clinton** (D)	2,148,222	47.38	Bob Dole (R)	1,859,883	41.02	Ross Perot (Reform)	483,207	10.66	21	
**1992**	**Bill Clinton** (D)	1,984,942	40.18	George H. W. Bush (R)	1,894,310	38.35	Ross Perot	1,036,426	20.98	21	
**1988**	**George H. W. Bush** (R)	2,416,549	55.00	Michael Dukakis (D)	1,939,629	44.15	—			23	
**1984**	**Ronald Reagan** (R)	2,678,560	58.90	Walter Mondale (D)	1,825,440	40.14	—			23	
**1980**	**Ronald Reagan** (R)	2,206,545	51.51	Jimmy Carter (D)	1,752,414	40.91	John B. Anderson	254,472	5.94	25	
**1976**	**Jimmy Carter** (D)	2,011,621	48.92	Gerald Ford (R)	2,000,505	48.65	—			25	
**1972**	**Richard Nixon** (R)	2,441,827	59.63	George McGovern (D)	1,558,889	38.07	—			25	
**1968**	**Richard Nixon** (R)	1,791,014	45.23	Hubert Humphrey (D)	1,700,586	42.95	George Wallace (Am. Ind.)	467,495	11.81	26	
**1964**	**Lyndon B. Johnson** (D)	2,498,331	62.94	Barry Goldwater (R)	1,470,865	37.06	—			26	
**1960**	John F. Kennedy (D)	1,944,248	46.72	**Richard Nixon** (R)	2,217,611	53.28	—			25	
**1956**	**Dwight D. Eisenhower** (R)	2,262,610	61.11	Adlai Stevenson II (D)	1,439,655	38.89	T. Coleman Andrews/ Unpledged Electors (Note: Was allied with a slate of unpledged electors in Louisiana, Mississippi and South Carolina)	—	—	25	
**1952**	**Dwight D. Eisenhower** (R)	2,100,391	56.76	Adlai Stevenson II (D)	1,600,367	43.24	-			25	
**1948**	**Harry S. Truman** (D)	1,452,791	49.48	Thomas E. Dewey (R)	1,445,684	49.24	Strom Thurmond (States' Rights D)	—	—	25	Henry Wallace (Prog.) won 1.3% of Ohio's votes
**1944**	Franklin D. Roosevelt (D)	1,570,763	49.82	**Thomas E. Dewey** (R)	1,582,293	50.18	—			25	
**1940**	**Franklin D. Roosevelt** (D)	1,733,139	52.2	Wendell Willkie (R)	1,586,773	47.8	—			26	
**1936**	**Franklin D. Roosevelt** (D)	1,747,140	57.99	Alf Landon (R)	1,127,855	37.44	—			26	
**1932**	**Franklin D. Roosevelt** (D)	1,301,695	49.88	Herbert Hoover (R)	1,227,319	47.03	—			26	
**1928**	**Herbert Hoover** (R)	1,627,546	64.89	Al Smith (D)	864,210	34.45	—			24	
**1924**	**Calvin Coolidge** (R)	1,176,130	58.33	John W. Davis (D)	477,888	23.7	Robert M. La Follette (Prog.)	357,948	17.75	24	
**1920**	**Warren G. Harding** (R)	1,182,022	58.47	James M. Cox (D)	780,037	38.58	Parley P. Christensen (Farmer-Labor)	—	—	24	
**1916**	**Woodrow Wilson** (D)	604,161	51.86	Charles E. Hughes (R)	514,753	44.18	—			24	
**1912**	**Woodrow Wilson** (D)	424,834	40.96	Theodore Roosevelt (Prog.)	229,807	22.16	William H. Taft (R)	278,168	26.82	24	National vote: D 41.8%, Prog 27.4% & R 23.2%
**1908**	**William H. Taft** (R)	572,312	51.03	William Jennings Bryan (D)	502,721	44.82	—			23	
**1904**	**Theodore Roosevelt** (R)	600,095	59.75	Alton B. Parker (D)	344,674	34.32	—			23	
**1900**	**William McKinley** (R)	543,918	52.30	William Jennings Bryan (D)	474,882	45.66	—			23	
**1896**	**William McKinley** (R)	525,991	51.86	William Jennings Bryan (D & People's)	477,497	47.08	—			23	
**1892**	Grover Cleveland (D)	404,115	47.53	**Benjamin Harrison** (R)	405,187	47.66	James B. Weaver (People's)	14,850	1.75	23	Electoral vote split 22 (Harrison) to 1 (Cleveland)
**1888 ***	**Benjamin Harrison** (R)	416,054	49.51	Grover Cleveland (D)	396,455	47.18	—			23	* Cleveland (D) won national popular vote, 48.6% to 47.8%
**1884**	Grover Cleveland (D)	368,280	46.94	**James G. Blaine** (R)	400,082	50.99	—			23	
**1880**	**James A. Garfield** (R)	375,048	51.73	Winfield S. Hancock (D)	340,821	47.01	James B. Weaver (Greenback Labor)	6,456	0.89	22	
**1876***	**Rutherford B. Hayes** (Note: Won the electoral college while losing the popular vote) (R)	330,698	50.21	Samuel J. Tilden (D)	323,182	49.07	—			22	* Tilden (D) won a national popular majority, 50.9% to 47.9%
**1872**	**Ulysses S. Grant** (R)	281,852	53.24	Horace Greeley (D & Lib. R)	244,321	46.15	—			22	
**1868**	**Ulysses S. Grant** (R)	280,159	54.0	Horatio Seymour (D)	238,506	46.0	—			21	
**1864**	**Abraham Lincoln** (Nat'l Union)	265,674	56.4	George B. McClellan (D)	205,609	43.6	—			21	

== Election of 1860 ==
The election of 1860 was a complex realigning election in which the breakdown of the previous two-party alignment culminated in four parties each competing for influence in different parts of the country. The result of the election, with the victory of an ardent opponent of slavery, spurred the secession of eleven states and brought about the American Civil War.

Year	Winner (nationally)	Votes	Percent	Runner-up (nationally)	Votes	Percent	Runner-up (nationally)	Votes	Percent	Runner-up (nationally)	Votes	Percent	Electoral votes
**1860**	**Abraham Lincoln** (R)	231,709	52.3	Stephen A. Douglas (N. Dem.)	187,421	42.3	John C. Breckinridge (S. Dem.)	11,406	2.6	John Bell (Const'l Union)	12,194	2.8	23

== Elections from 1828 to 1856 ==
Year	Winner (nationally)	Votes	Percent	Runner-up (nationally)	Votes	Percent	Other national candidates	Votes	Percent	Electoral votes	Notes
1856	James Buchanan (D)	170,874	44.21	**John C. Frémont** (R)	187,497	48.51	Millard Fillmore (American & Whig)	28,126	7.28	23	
1852	**Franklin Pierce** (D)	168,933	47.83	Winfield Scott (Whig)	152,523	43.18	John P. Hale (Free Soil)	31,732	8.98	23	
1848	Zachary Taylor (Whig)	138,359	42.12	**Lewis Cass** (D)	154,773	47.12	Martin Van Buren (Free Soil)	35,347	10.76	23	
1844	James K. Polk (D)	149,061	47.74	**Henry Clay** (Whig)	155,113	49.68	—			23	
1840	**William Henry Harrison** (Whig)	148,157	54.1	Martin Van Buren (D)	124,782	45.57	—			21	
1836	Martin Van Buren (D)	96,238	47.56	**William Henry Harrison** (Whig)	104,958	51.87	various (Note: Three other candidates ran and received electoral votes nationally as part of the unsuccessful Whig strategy to defeat Martin Van Buren by running four candidates with local appeal in different regions of the country. The others were Hugh Lawson White, Daniel Webster, and Willie Person Mangum. None of these candidates appeared on the ballot in Ohio.)			21	
1832	**Andrew Jackson** (D)	81,246	51.33	Henry Clay (Nat'l R)	76,539	48.35	William Wirt (Anti-Masonic)	509	0.32	21	
1828	**Andrew Jackson** (D)	67,596	51.6	John Quincy Adams (Nat'l R)	63,453	48.4	—			16	

== Election of 1824 ==
The election of 1824 was a complex realigning election following the collapse of the prevailing Democratic-Republican Party, resulting in four different candidates each claiming to carry the banner of the party, and competing for influence in different parts of the country. The election was the only one in history to be decided by the House of Representatives under the provisions of the Twelfth Amendment to the United States Constitution after no candidate secured a majority of the electoral vote. It was also the only presidential election in which the candidate who received a plurality of electoral votes (Andrew Jackson) did not become president, a source of great bitterness for Jackson and his supporters, who proclaimed the election of Adams a corrupt bargain.

Year	Winner (nationally)	Votes	Percent	Runner-up (nationally)	Votes	Percent	Runner-up (nationally)	Votes	Percent	Runner-up (nationally)	Votes	Percent	Electoral votes
**1824**	Andrew Jackson (D-R)	12,280	24.55	John Quincy Adams (D-R)	18,489	36.96	**Henry Clay** (D-R)	19,255	38.49	William H. Crawford (D-R)	no ballots		16

Note: The national popular vote (from 18 of 24 states, the other six had electors chosen by the state legislature) was Jackson 41.36%, Adams 30.92%, Clay 12.99% and Crawford 11.21%. After none of the candidates had a majority on the electoral college, Adams won the contingent election in the House of Representatives.

== Elections from 1804 to 1820 ==
In the election of 1820, incumbent President James Monroe ran effectively unopposed, winning all eight of Ohio’s electoral votes, and all electoral votes nationwide except one vote in New Hampshire. To the extent that a popular vote was held, it was primarily directed to filling the office of vice president.

Year	Winner (nationally)	Loser(s) (nationally)	Electoral votes	Notes
**1820**	**James Monroe** (D-R)	—	8	Monroe effectively ran unopposed.
**1816**	**James Monroe** (D-R)	Rufus King (Fed.)	8	
**1812**	**James Madison** (D-R)	DeWitt Clinton (Fed./D-R Fusion)	7	
**1808**	**James Madison** (D-R)	Charles C. Pinckney (Fed.)	3	
**1804**	**Thomas Jefferson** (D-R)	Charles C. Pinckney (Fed.)	3	

== See also ==
- Elections in Ohio
