= 1824 United States presidential election in Ohio =

- October 26 – December 2, 1824
- Turnout: 38.3% ▲31.5 pp
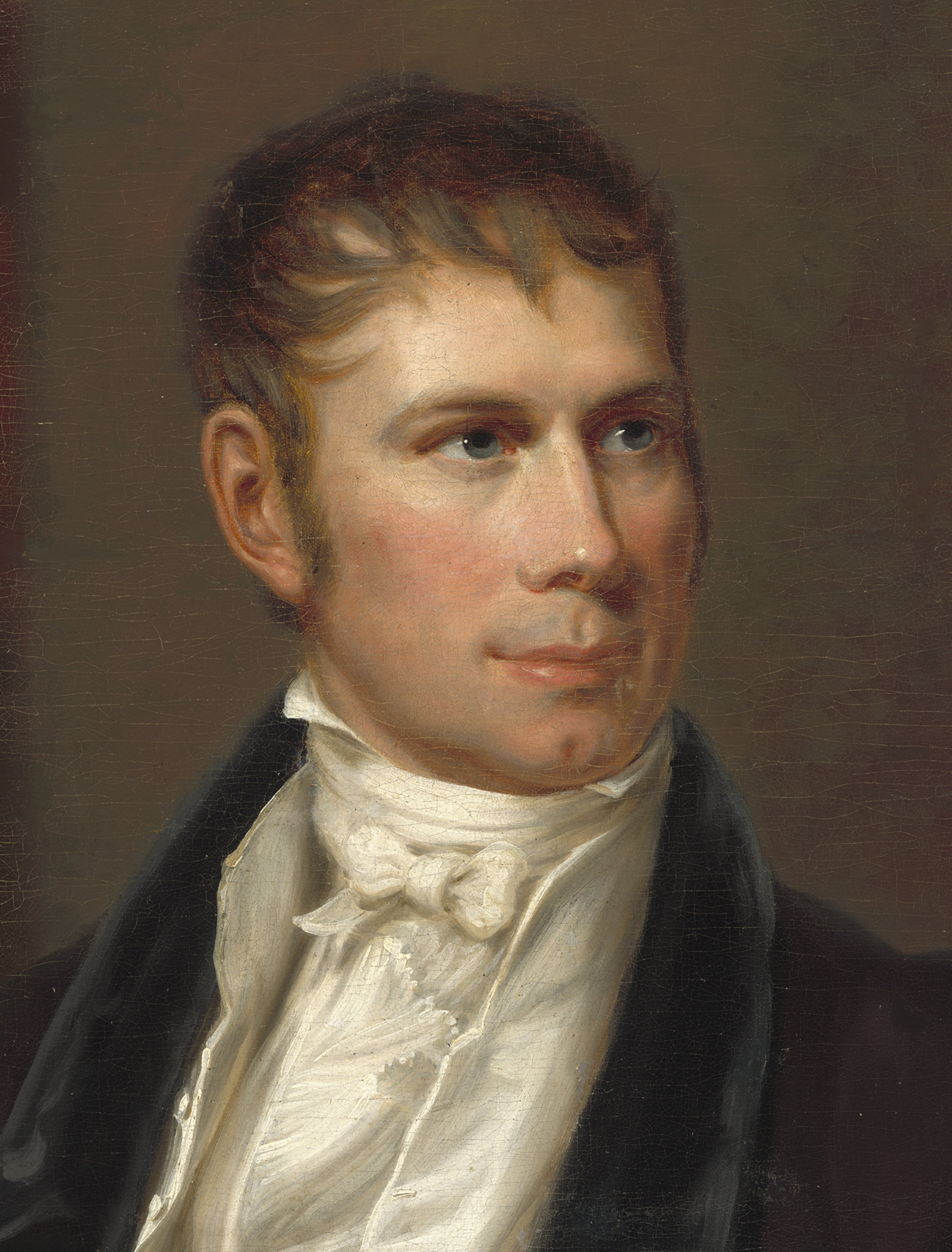

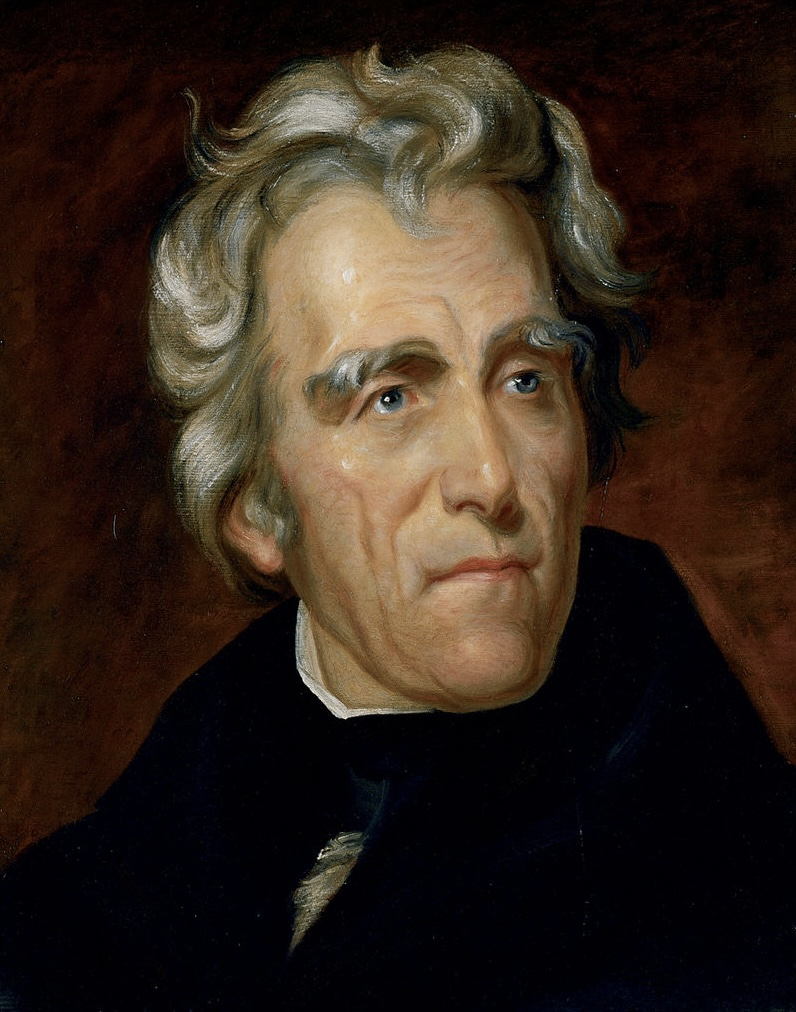

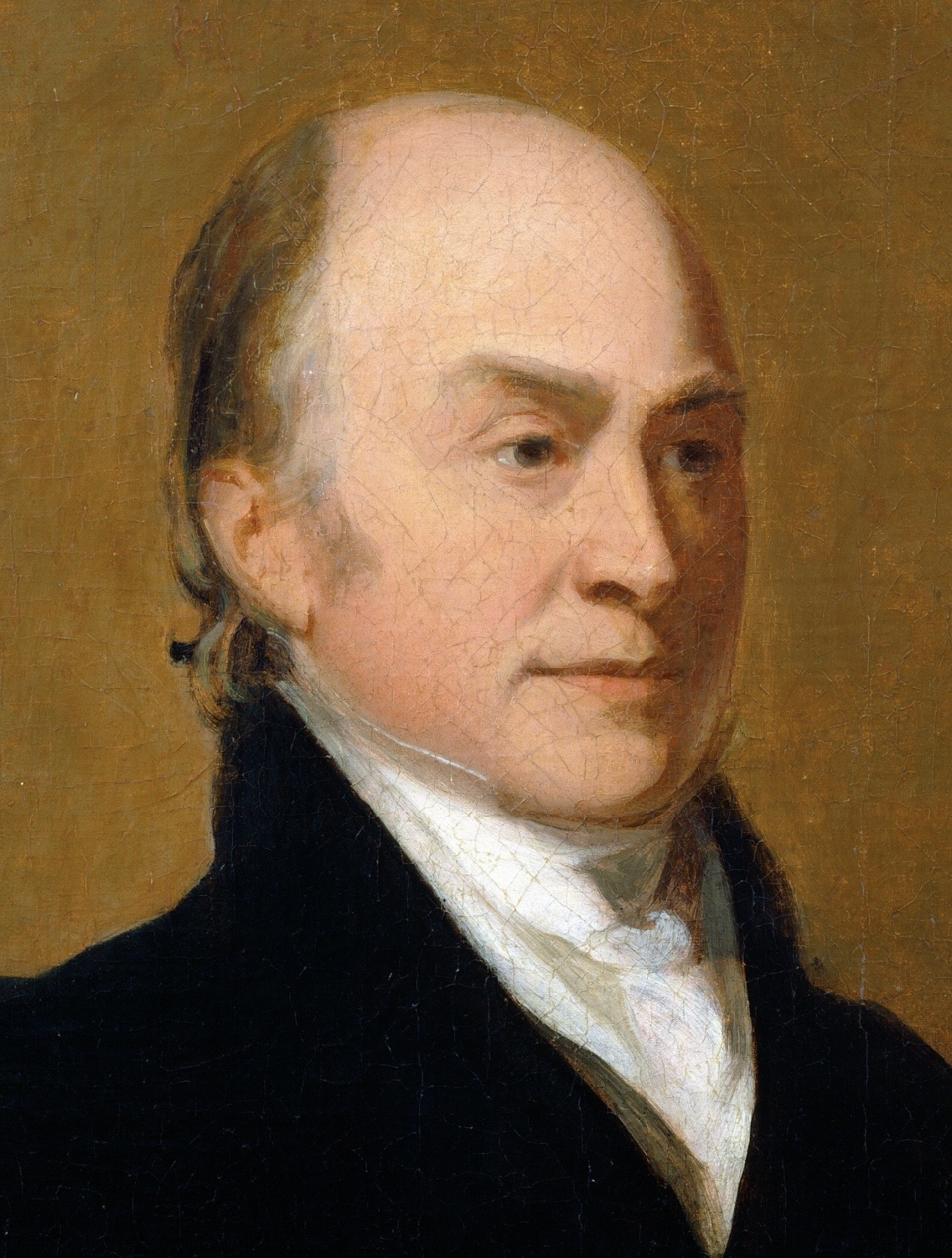
Nominee	Henry Clay	Andrew Jackson	John Quincy Adams
Party	Democratic-Republican	Democratic-Republican	Democratic-Republican
Home state	Kentucky	Tennessee	Massachusetts
Running mate	Nathan Sanford	John C. Calhoun	John C. Calhoun
Electoral vote	16	0	0
Popular vote	19,255	18,489	12,280
Percentage	38.49%	36.96%	24.55%
County results
Clay
30–40%
40–50%
50–60%
60–70%
70–80%
80–90%
Jackson
40–50%
50–60%
60–70%
70–80%
Adams
40–50%
50–60%
60–70%
70–80%
80–90%
90–100%
No Votes
No data
President before election
James Monroe
Democratic-Republican
Elected President
John Quincy Adams
Democratic-Republican

The 1824 United States presidential election in Ohio took place between October 26 and December 2, 1824, as part of the 1824 United States presidential election. Voters chose 16 representatives, or electors to the Electoral College, who voted for President and Vice President.

During this election, the Democratic-Republican Party was the only major national party, and four different candidates from this party sought the presidency. Ohio voted for Henry Clay over Andrew Jackson, John Quincy Adams, and William H. Crawford. Clay won Ohio by a narrow margin of 1.53%. This was the first time that Ohio voted for a losing presidential candidate. Among the electors was future president William Henry Harrison, who voted for Clay along with the rest of the electors.

== Results ==
1824 United States presidential election in Ohio
Party	Candidate	Votes	Percentage	Electoral votes
Democratic-Republican	Henry Clay	19,255	38.49%	16
Democratic-Republican	Andrew Jackson	18,489	36.96%	0
Democratic-Republican	John Quincy Adams	12,280	24.55%	0
Totals		50,024	100.0%	16

== See also ==
- United States presidential elections in Ohio

== Bibliography ==
- Ratcliffe, Donald J. (Autumn 1987). "Voter Turnout in Early Ohio". Journal of the Early Republic. 7 (3): 223–51. JSTOR 3123782.
