= 1880 United States presidential election in Ohio =

- November 2, 1880
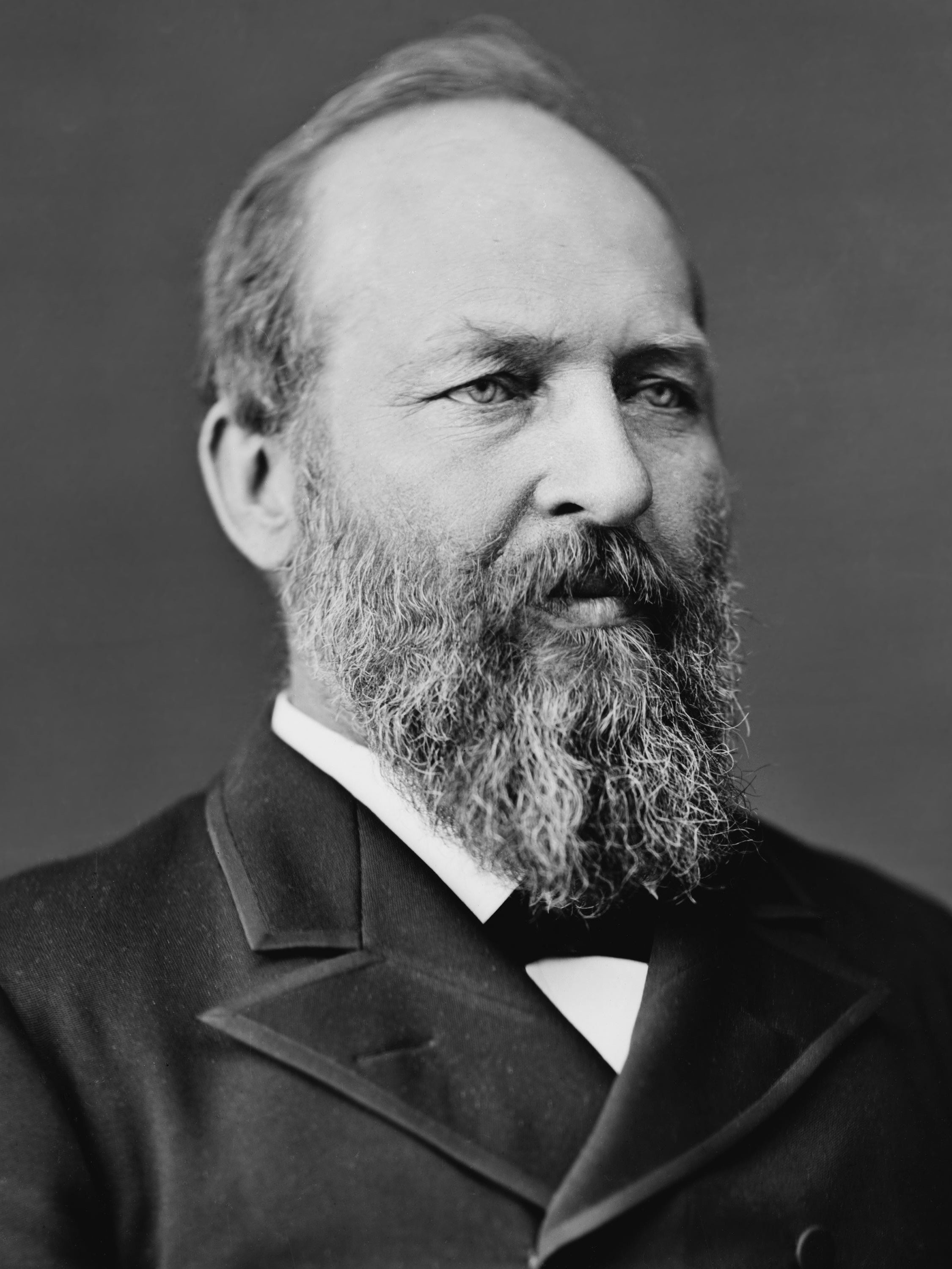

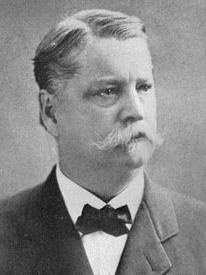
Nominee	James A. Garfield	Winfield Scott Hancock
Party	Republican	Democratic
Home state	Ohio	Pennsylvania
Running mate	Chester A. Arthur	William Hayden English
Electoral vote	22	0
Popular vote	375,048	340,821
Percentage	51.73%	47.01%
County results
Garfield
50–60%
60–70%
70–80%
Hancock
40–50%
50–60%
60–70%
70–80%
President before election
Rutherford B. Hayes
Republican
Elected President
James A. Garfield
Republican

The 1880 United States presidential election in Ohio was held on November 2, 1880, as part of the 1880 United States presidential election. State voters chose 22 electors to the Electoral College, who voted for president and vice president.

Ohio was narrowly won by the Republican Party candidate and native son, James A. Garfield, won the state with 51.73% of the popular vote. The Democratic Party candidate, Winfield Scott Hancock, garnered 47.01% of the popular vote.

== Results ==
1880 United States presidential election in Ohio
Party	Candidate	Votes	Percentage	Electoral votes
Republican	James A. Garfield	375,048	51.73%	22
Democratic	Winfield Scott Hancock	340,821	47.01%	0
Greenback	James B. Weaver	6,456	0.89%	0
Prohibition	Neal Dow	2,616	0.36%	0
Write-ins	Scattered	26	0.00%	0
Totals		724,967	100.0%	22

=== Results by county ===
County	James Abraham Garfield Republican		Winfield Scott Hancock Democratic		Various candidates Other parties		Margin		Total votes cast
County	#	%	#	%	#	%	#	%	#
Adams	2,563	48.39%	2,725	51.44%	9	0.17%	-162	-3.05%	5,297
Allen	2,906	42.44%	3,890	56.81%	51	0.74%	-984	-14.37%	6,847
Ashland	2,752	46.07%	3,217	53.86%	4	0.07%	-465	-7.79%	5,973
Ashtabula	6,926	72.88%	2,286	24.06%	291	3.06%	4,640	48.82%	9,503
Athens	3,645	60.42%	2,234	37.03%	154	2.55%	1,411	23.39%	6,033
Auglaize	1,837	33.70%	3,599	66.02%	15	0.28%	-1,762	-32.32%	5,451
Belmont	5,539	50.08%	5,379	48.63%	143	1.29%	160	1.45%	11,061
Brown	3,184	42.35%	4,324	57.51%	11	0.15%	-1,140	-15.16%	7,519
Butler	3,831	37.90%	6,266	62.00%	10	0.10%	-2,435	-24.10%	10,107
Carroll	2,241	58.00%	1,569	40.61%	54	1.40%	672	17.39%	3,864
Champaign	4,100	58.38%	2,865	40.79%	58	0.83%	1,235	17.59%	7,023
Clark	6,229	58.95%	4,179	39.55%	158	1.49%	2,050	19.40%	10,566
Clermont	4,028	46.31%	4,417	50.79%	252	2.90%	-389	-4.48%	8,697
Clinton	3,937	64.29%	2,167	35.39%	20	0.33%	1,770	28.90%	6,124
Columbiana	6,545	58.45%	4,273	38.16%	379	3.38%	2,272	20.29%	11,197
Coshocton	2,831	44.99%	3,440	54.67%	21	0.33%	-609	-9.68%	6,292
Crawford	2,622	36.10%	4,567	62.87%	75	1.03%	-1,945	-26.77%	7,264
Cuyahoga	22,123	58.66%	15,130	40.12%	463	1.23%	6,993	18.54%	37,716
Darke	4,046	43.46%	5,167	55.51%	96	1.03%	-1,121	-12.05%	9,309
Defiance	1,977	38.41%	3,140	61.01%	30	0.58%	-1,163	-22.60%	5,147
Delaware	3,508	52.90%	2,968	44.75%	156	2.35%	540	8.15%	6,632
Erie	3,661	51.51%	3,305	46.50%	141	1.98%	356	5.01%	7,107
Fairfield	3,103	38.91%	4,842	60.72%	29	0.36%	-1,739	-21.81%	7,974
Fayette	2,830	56.99%	2,111	42.51%	25	0.50%	719	14.48%	4,966
Franklin	9,438	48.30%	9,863	50.47%	240	1.23%	-425	-2.17%	19,541
Fulton	2,912	60.65%	1,787	37.22%	102	2.12%	1,125	23.43%	4,801
Gallia	3,488	59.92%	2,310	39.68%	23	0.40%	1,178	20.24%	5,821
Geauga	3,053	77.72%	815	20.75%	60	1.53%	2,238	56.97%	3,928
Greene	4,927	66.29%	2,455	33.03%	51	0.69%	2,472	33.26%	7,433
Guernsey	3,318	55.78%	2,568	43.17%	62	1.04%	750	12.61%	5,948
Hamilton	35,173	53.76%	30,122	46.04%	133	0.20%	5,051	7.72%	65,428
Hancock	3,124	47.94%	3,350	51.41%	42	0.64%	-226	-3.47%	6,516
Hardin	3,472	53.11%	3,032	46.38%	33	0.50%	440	6.73%	6,537
Harrison	2,767	56.53%	2,082	42.53%	46	0.94%	685	14.00%	4,895
Henry	1,738	37.44%	2,871	61.85%	33	0.71%	-1,133	-24.41%	4,642
Highland	3,648	50.91%	3,490	48.71%	27	0.38%	158	2.20%	7,165
Hocking	1,830	42.15%	2,422	55.78%	90	2.07%	-592	-13.63%	4,342
Holmes	1,370	29.36%	3,281	70.30%	16	0.34%	-1,911	-40.94%	4,667
Huron	4,566	57.96%	3,040	38.59%	272	3.45%	1,526	19.37%	7,878
Jackson	2,763	57.04%	2,031	41.93%	50	1.03%	732	15.11%	4,844
Jefferson	4,434	59.41%	2,945	39.46%	85	1.14%	1,489	19.95%	7,464
Knox	3,432	48.82%	3,475	49.43%	123	1.75%	-43	-0.61%	7,030
Lake	2,978	71.06%	1,104	26.34%	109	2.60%	1,874	44.72%	4,191
Lawrence	4,627	61.50%	2,862	38.04%	34	0.45%	1,765	23.46%	7,523
Licking	4,210	42.62%	5,575	56.44%	93	0.94%	-1,365	-13.82%	9,878
Logan	3,739	59.16%	2,468	39.05%	113	1.79%	1,271	20.11%	6,320
Lorain	5,609	66.25%	2,752	32.51%	105	1.24%	2,857	33.74%	8,466
Lucas	7,157	52.67%	5,985	44.04%	447	3.29%	1,172	8.63%	13,589
Madison	2,680	53.09%	2,305	45.66%	63	1.25%	375	7.43%	5,048
Mahoning	4,943	53.33%	4,044	43.63%	282	3.04%	899	9.70%	9,269
Marion	2,192	42.46%	2,932	56.79%	39	0.76%	-740	-14.33%	5,163
Medina	3,340	60.26%	2,158	38.93%	45	0.81%	1,182	21.33%	5,543
Meigs	4,103	59.51%	2,749	39.87%	43	0.62%	1,354	19.64%	6,895
Mercer	1,473	30.33%	3,367	69.34%	16	0.33%	-1,894	-39.01%	4,856
Miami	4,928	57.33%	3,604	41.93%	64	0.74%	1,324	15.40%	8,596
Monroe	1,600	29.30%	3,751	68.70%	109	2.00%	-2,151	-39.40%	5,460
Montgomery	9,726	48.28%	10,332	51.28%	89	0.44%	-606	-3.00%	20,147
Morgan	2,510	53.11%	2,091	44.24%	125	2.64%	419	8.87%	4,726
Morrow	2,581	52.92%	2,143	43.94%	153	3.14%	438	8.98%	4,877
Muskingum	5,804	51.63%	5,336	47.46%	102	0.91%	468	4.17%	11,242
Noble	2,316	50.55%	2,044	44.61%	222	4.85%	272	5.94%	4,582
Ottawa	1,510	36.58%	2,559	61.99%	59	1.43%	-1,049	-25.41%	4,128
Paulding	1,527	51.54%	1,431	48.30%	5	0.17%	96	3.24%	2,963
Perry	2,676	42.84%	3,187	51.02%	384	6.15%	-511	-8.18%	6,247
Pickaway	2,910	43.63%	3,753	56.27%	7	0.10%	-843	-12.64%	6,670
Pike	1,756	44.16%	2,192	55.13%	28	0.70%	-436	-10.97%	3,976
Portage	3,990	54.97%	3,147	43.35%	122	1.68%	843	11.62%	7,259
Preble	3,183	53.02%	2,711	45.16%	109	1.82%	472	7.86%	6,003
Putnam	1,851	34.94%	3,417	64.50%	30	0.57%	-1,566	-29.56%	5,298
Richland	4,032	45.11%	4,885	54.65%	22	0.25%	-853	-9.54%	8,939
Ross	4,734	50.81%	4,551	48.85%	32	0.34%	183	1.96%	9,317
Sandusky	3,059	44.49%	3,640	52.94%	177	2.57%	-581	-8.45%	6,876
Scioto	3,639	55.03%	2,912	44.03%	62	0.94%	727	11.00%	6,613
Seneca	4,008	44.61%	4,845	53.92%	132	1.47%	-837	-9.31%	8,985
Shelby	2,274	40.51%	3,320	59.14%	20	0.36%	-1,046	-18.63%	5,614
Stark	7,264	50.21%	6,965	48.14%	238	1.65%	299	2.07%	14,467
Summit	5,890	57.73%	4,071	39.90%	241	2.36%	1,819	17.83%	10,202
Trumbull	6,796	66.39%	3,148	30.75%	293	2.86%	3,648	35.64%	10,237
Tuscarawas	4,096	45.33%	4,844	53.61%	96	1.06%	-748	-8.28%	9,036
Union	3,302	59.12%	2,236	40.04%	47	0.84%	1,066	19.08%	5,585
Van Wert	2,634	50.51%	2,571	49.30%	10	0.19%	63	1.21%	5,215
Vinton	1,700	45.98%	1,992	53.88%	5	0.14%	-292	-7.90%	3,697
Warren	4,565	63.86%	2,564	35.87%	19	0.27%	2,001	27.99%	7,148
Washington	4,711	50.64%	4,452	47.86%	140	1.50%	259	2.78%	9,303
Wayne	4,424	47.68%	4,819	51.94%	35	0.38%	-395	-4.26%	9,278
Williams	2,881	50.92%	2,596	45.88%	181	3.20%	285	5.04%	5,658
Wood	4,305	54.16%	3,441	43.29%	203	2.55%	864	10.87%	7,949
Wyandot	2,398	44.46%	2,981	55.27%	15	0.28%	-583	-10.81%	5,394
Totals	375,048	51.73%	340,821	47.01%	9,098	1.25%	34,227	4.72%	724,967

== See also ==
- United States presidential elections in Ohio
