= 1940 United States presidential election in Ohio =

- November 5, 1940
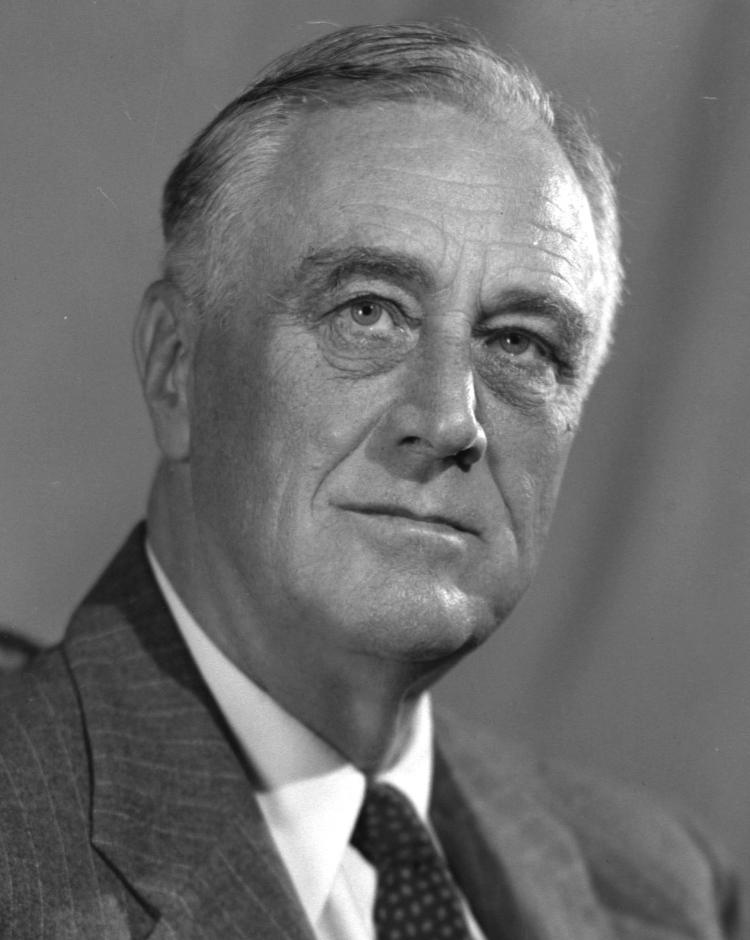

Nominee	Franklin D. Roosevelt	Wendell Willkie
Party	Democratic	Republican
Home state	New York	New York
Running mate	Henry A. Wallace	Charles L. McNary
Electoral vote	26	0
Popular vote	1,733,139	1,586,773
Percentage	52.20%	47.80%
County results
Roosevelt
50–60%
60–70%
Willkie
50–60%
60–70%
70–80%
President before election
Franklin D. Roosevelt
Democratic
Elected President
Franklin D. Roosevelt
Democratic

The 1940 United States presidential election in Ohio was held on November 5, 1940, as part of the 1940 United States presidential election. State voters chose 26 electors to the Electoral College, who voted for president and vice president.

Ohio was won by the Democratic Party candidate, incumbent President Franklin D. Roosevelt, with 52.20% of the popular vote. The Republican Party candidate, Wendell Willkie, garnered 47.80% of the popular vote. This is the only time that Democrats won Ohio in three consecutive elections.

Franklin Roosevelt became the first presidential candidate to carry Ohio three times, which only Richard Nixon (who won the state only twice consecutively) and Donald Trump have achieved since.

== Results ==
1940 United States presidential election in Ohio
Party	Candidate	Votes	Percentage	Electoral votes
Democratic	Franklin D. Roosevelt (incumbent)	1,733,139	52.20%	26
Republican	Wendell Willkie	1,586,773	47.80%	0
Totals		3,319,912	100.0%	26

=== Results by county ===
County	Franklin Delano Roosevelt Democratic		Wendell Willkie Republican		Margin		Total votes cast
County	#	%	#	%	#	%	Total votes cast
Adams	5,007	44.76%	6,180	55.24%	-1,173	-10.49%	11,187
Allen	14,469	41.17%	20,675	58.83%	-6,206	-17.66%	35,144
Ashland	7,835	47.60%	8,624	52.40%	-789	-4.79%	16,459
Ashtabula	14,454	43.87%	18,491	56.13%	-4,037	-12.25%	32,945
Athens	11,449	50.52%	11,213	49.48%	236	1.04%	22,662
Auglaize	5,704	38.92%	8,953	61.08%	-3,249	-22.17%	14,657
Belmont	28,618	61.78%	17,705	38.22%	10,913	23.56%	46,323
Brown	5,644	50.75%	5,477	49.25%	167	1.50%	11,121
Butler	30,821	56.86%	23,380	43.14%	7,441	13.73%	54,201
Carroll	3,589	41.02%	5,160	58.98%	-1,571	-17.96%	8,749
Champaign	5,929	43.06%	7,841	56.94%	-1,912	-13.89%	13,770
Clark	25,888	55.59%	20,681	44.41%	5,207	11.18%	46,569
Clermont	8,942	48.84%	9,367	51.16%	-425	-2.32%	18,309
Clinton	4,964	41.40%	7,027	58.60%	-2,063	-17.20%	11,991
Columbiana	22,349	51.29%	21,221	48.71%	1,128	2.59%	43,570
Coshocton	7,889	47.78%	8,623	52.22%	-734	-4.45%	16,512
Crawford	8,966	46.45%	10,336	53.55%	-1,370	-7.10%	19,302
Cuyahoga	347,118	62.41%	209,070	37.59%	138,048	24.82%	556,188
Darke	9,651	46.40%	11,147	53.60%	-1,496	-7.19%	20,798
Defiance	4,313	35.00%	8,010	65.00%	-3,697	-30.00%	12,323
Delaware	5,666	37.19%	9,570	62.81%	-3,904	-25.62%	15,236
Erie	9,254	45.10%	11,267	54.90%	-2,013	-9.81%	20,521
Fairfield	11,298	51.10%	10,813	48.90%	485	2.19%	22,111
Fayette	5,249	46.73%	5,984	53.27%	-735	-6.54%	11,233
Franklin	96,601	51.08%	92,533	48.92%	4,068	2.15%	189,134
Fulton	2,530	22.62%	8,653	77.38%	-6,123	-54.75%	11,183
Gallia	3,943	35.12%	7,285	64.88%	-3,342	-29.76%	11,228
Geauga	3,318	38.19%	5,371	61.81%	-2,053	-23.63%	8,689
Greene	8,881	48.92%	9,273	51.08%	-392	-2.16%	18,154
Guernsey	8,710	46.24%	10,125	53.76%	-1,415	-7.51%	18,835
Hamilton	148,907	49.04%	154,733	50.96%	-5,826	-1.92%	303,640
Hancock	7,755	35.36%	14,174	64.64%	-6,419	-29.27%	21,929
Hardin	6,547	41.60%	9,192	58.40%	-2,645	-16.81%	15,739
Harrison	4,559	44.31%	5,729	55.69%	-1,170	-11.37%	10,288
Henry	3,508	31.07%	7,784	68.93%	-4,276	-37.87%	11,292
Highland	6,921	44.79%	8,530	55.21%	-1,609	-10.41%	15,451
Hocking	5,688	51.60%	5,336	48.40%	352	3.19%	11,024
Holmes	3,349	51.13%	3,201	48.87%	148	2.26%	6,550
Huron	6,741	36.44%	11,758	63.56%	-5,017	-27.12%	18,499
Jackson	6,382	45.80%	7,551	54.20%	-1,169	-8.39%	13,933
Jefferson	29,514	64.03%	16,578	35.97%	12,936	28.07%	46,092
Knox	7,081	40.73%	10,303	59.27%	-3,222	-18.53%	17,384
Lake	12,408	47.96%	13,464	52.04%	-1,056	-4.08%	25,872
Lawrence	10,661	50.92%	10,274	49.08%	387	1.85%	20,935
Licking	16,379	50.14%	16,288	49.86%	91	0.28%	32,667
Logan	6,351	39.17%	9,861	60.83%	-3,510	-21.65%	16,212
Lorain	25,831	52.45%	23,422	47.55%	2,409	4.89%	49,253
Lucas	77,948	50.50%	76,405	49.50%	1,543	1.00%	154,353
Madison	4,390	42.65%	5,904	57.35%	-1,514	-14.71%	10,294
Mahoning	76,441	67.09%	37,496	32.91%	38,945	34.18%	113,937
Marion	10,462	46.96%	11,817	53.04%	-1,355	-6.08%	22,279
Medina	6,722	39.92%	10,116	60.08%	-3,394	-20.16%	16,838
Meigs	4,983	40.77%	7,239	59.23%	-2,256	-18.46%	12,222
Mercer	5,114	39.28%	7,905	60.72%	-2,791	-21.44%	13,019
Miami	11,799	44.48%	14,725	55.52%	-2,926	-11.03%	26,524
Monroe	4,138	47.72%	4,534	52.28%	-396	-4.57%	8,672
Montgomery	86,084	59.80%	57,866	40.20%	28,218	19.60%	143,950
Morgan	2,637	34.68%	4,966	65.32%	-2,329	-30.63%	7,603
Morrow	3,215	37.07%	5,457	62.93%	-2,242	-25.85%	8,672
Muskingum	15,753	44.82%	19,395	55.18%	-3,642	-10.36%	35,148
Noble	3,037	38.16%	4,922	61.84%	-1,885	-23.68%	7,959
Ottawa	5,556	44.71%	6,872	55.29%	-1,316	-10.59%	12,428
Paulding	3,155	38.93%	4,949	61.07%	-1,794	-22.14%	8,104
Perry	6,953	44.54%	8,656	55.46%	-1,703	-10.91%	15,609
Pickaway	6,895	53.58%	5,974	46.42%	921	7.16%	12,869
Pike	4,962	61.06%	3,165	38.94%	1,797	22.11%	8,127
Portage	12,687	51.86%	11,777	48.14%	910	3.72%	24,464
Preble	5,735	46.83%	6,511	53.17%	-776	-6.34%	12,246
Putnam	3,655	29.01%	8,946	70.99%	-5,291	-41.99%	12,601
Richland	18,645	52.08%	17,157	47.92%	1,488	4.16%	35,802
Ross	12,447	51.38%	11,780	48.62%	667	2.75%	24,227
Sandusky	7,116	33.61%	14,054	66.39%	-6,938	-32.77%	21,170
Scioto	21,926	52.98%	19,462	47.02%	2,464	5.95%	41,388
Seneca	7,464	31.45%	16,272	68.55%	-8,808	-37.11%	23,736
Shelby	6,105	46.13%	7,130	53.87%	-1,025	-7.74%	13,235
Stark	59,496	56.19%	46,384	43.81%	13,112	12.38%	105,880
Summit	89,555	58.55%	63,405	41.45%	26,150	17.10%	152,960
Trumbull	34,615	58.04%	25,026	41.96%	9,589	16.08%	59,641
Tuscarawas	19,004	56.43%	14,675	43.57%	4,329	12.85%	33,679
Union	3,947	35.36%	7,214	64.64%	-3,267	-29.27%	11,161
Van Wert	6,254	41.95%	8,656	58.05%	-2,402	-16.11%	14,910
Vinton	2,404	42.97%	3,190	57.03%	-786	-14.05%	5,594
Warren	6,895	44.15%	8,722	55.85%	-1,827	-11.70%	15,617
Washington	8,584	38.77%	13,558	61.23%	-4,974	-22.46%	22,142
Wayne	10,748	44.28%	13,525	55.72%	-2,777	-11.44%	24,273
Williams	4,065	30.05%	9,463	69.95%	-5,398	-39.90%	13,528
Wood	9,711	36.36%	16,998	63.64%	-7,287	-27.28%	26,709
Wyandot	4,206	40.14%	6,272	59.86%	-2,066	-19.72%	10,478
Totals	1,733,139	52.20%	1,586,773	47.80%	146,366	4.41%	3,319,912

==== Counties that flipped from Democratic to Republican ====
- Allen
- Ashland
- Ashtabula
- Auglaize
- Clermont
- Coshocton
- Crawford
- Darke
- Defiance
- Erie
- Fayette
- Greene
- Guernsey
- Hamilton
- Hardin
- Harrison
- Henry
- Highland
- Hancock
- Huron
- Knox
- Lake
- Madison
- Marion
- Medina
- Mercer
- Miami
- Monroe
- Muskingum
- Ottawa
- Paulding
- Perry
- Preble
- Putnam
- Sandusky
- Shelby
- Van Wert
- Vinton
- Wayne
- Wyandot

== See also ==
- United States presidential elections in Ohio
