= 1864 United States presidential election in Ohio =

- November 8, 1864

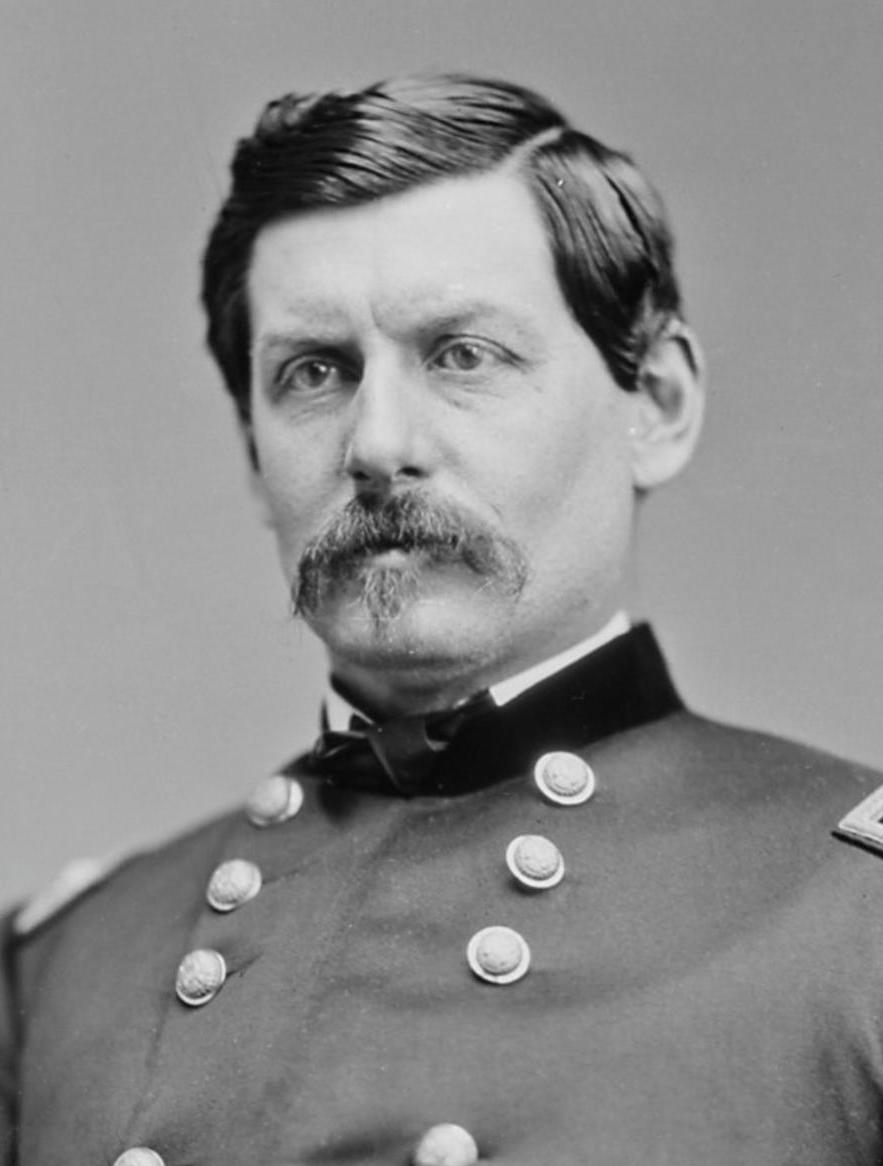
Nominee	Abraham Lincoln	George B. McClellan
Party	National Union	Democratic
Home state	Illinois	New Jersey
Running mate	Andrew Johnson	George H. Pendleton
Electoral vote	21	0
Popular vote	265,654	205,599
Percentage	56.37%	43.63%
County results
Lincoln
50–60%
60–70%
70–80%
80–90%
McClellan
50–60%
60–70%
70–80%
President before election
Abraham Lincoln
Republican
Elected President
Abraham Lincoln
National Union

The 1864 United States presidential election in Ohio was held on November 8, 1864, as part of the 1864 United States presidential election. State voters chose 21 electors to the Electoral College, who voted for president and vice president.

Ohio was won by the National Union Party candidate, incumbent Republican President Abraham Lincoln and his running mate Andrew Johnson. They defeated the Democratic Party candidate, George B. McClellan and his running mate George H. Pendleton. Lincoln won the state by a margin of 12.74%.

== Results ==
1864 United States presidential election in Ohio
Party	Candidate	Votes	Percentage	Electoral votes
National Union	Abraham Lincoln (incumbent)	265,654	56.37%	21
Democratic	George B. McClellan	205,599	43.63%	0
Totals		471,253	100.0%	21

=== Results by county ===
County	Abraham Lincoln National Union		George B. McClellan Democratic		Margin		Total votes cast
County	#	%	#	%	#	%	Total votes cast
Adams	2,094	51.99%	1,934	48.01%	160	3.97%	4,028
Allen	1,882	45.61%	2,244	54.39%	-362	-8.77%	4,126
Ashland	2,144	48.46%	2,280	51.54%	-136	-3.07%	4,424
Ashtabula	6,045	85.30%	1,042	14.70%	5,003	70.59%	7,087
Athens	3,040	69.82%	1,314	30.18%	1,726	39.64%	4,354
Auglaize	1,180	33.17%	2,377	66.83%	-1,197	-33.65%	3,557
Belmont	3,379	49.10%	3,503	50.90%	-124	-1.80%	6,882
Brown	2,702	47.98%	2,929	52.02%	-227	-4.03%	5,631
Butler	3,250	42.96%	4,316	57.04%	-1,066	-14.09%	7,566
Carroll	1,826	59.79%	1,228	40.21%	598	19.58%	3,054
Champaign	2,766	61.06%	1,764	38.94%	1,002	22.12%	4,530
Clark	3,720	68.61%	1,702	31.39%	2,018	37.22%	5,422
Clermont	3,316	50.02%	3,314	49.98%	2	0.03%	6,630
Clinton	2,771	66.55%	1,393	33.45%	1,378	33.09%	4,164
Columbiana	4,553	64.54%	2,501	35.46%	2,052	29.09%	7,054
Coshocton	2,122	46.40%	2,451	53.60%	-329	-7.19%	4,573
Crawford	1,955	38.34%	3,144	61.66%	-1,189	-23.32%	5,099
Cuyahoga	10,009	63.06%	5,864	36.94%	4,145	26.11%	15,873
Darke	2,584	48.90%	2,700	51.10%	-116	-2.20%	5,284
Defiance	1,146	42.15%	1,573	57.85%	-427	-15.70%	2,719
Delaware	2,900	60.28%	1,911	39.72%	989	20.56%	4,811
Erie	3,033	62.41%	1,827	37.59%	1,206	24.81%	4,860
Fairfield	2,427	40.87%	3,512	59.13%	-1,085	-18.27%	5,939
Fayette	1,848	59.83%	1,241	40.17%	607	19.65%	3,089
Franklin	4,819	45.73%	5,719	54.27%	-900	-8.54%	10,538
Fulton	1,953	66.86%	968	33.14%	985	33.72%	2,921
Gallia	2,828	70.75%	1,169	29.25%	1,659	41.51%	3,997
Geauga	2,974	85.73%	495	14.27%	2,479	71.46%	3,469
Greene	3,887	71.40%	1,557	28.60%	2,330	42.80%	5,444
Guernsey	2,677	57.52%	1,977	42.48%	700	15.04%	4,654
Hamilton	22,833	57.89%	16,606	42.11%	6,227	15.79%	39,439
Hancock	2,178	48.64%	2,300	51.36%	-122	-2.72%	4,478
Hardin	1,640	52.92%	1,459	47.08%	181	5.84%	3,099
Harrison	2,236	58.81%	1,566	41.19%	670	17.62%	3,802
Henry	830	40.06%	1,242	59.94%	-412	-19.88%	2,072
Highland	3,120	54.61%	2,593	45.39%	527	9.22%	5,713
Hocking	1,381	42.30%	1,884	57.70%	-503	-15.41%	3,265
Holmes	1,066	28.45%	2,681	71.55%	-1,615	-43.10%	3,747
Huron	4,430	67.99%	2,086	32.01%	2,344	35.97%	6,516
Jackson	1,957	59.77%	1,317	40.23%	640	19.55%	3,274
Jefferson	3,407	66.32%	1,730	33.68%	1,677	32.65%	5,137
Knox	2,899	53.25%	2,545	46.75%	354	6.50%	5,444
Lake	2,787	82.63%	586	17.37%	2,201	65.25%	3,373
Lawrence	2,985	72.68%	1,122	27.32%	1,863	45.36%	4,107
Licking	3,312	46.22%	3,853	53.78%	-541	-7.55%	7,165
Logan	2,637	61.86%	1,626	38.14%	1,011	23.72%	4,263
Lorain	4,600	73.65%	1,646	26.35%	2,954	47.29%	6,246
Lucas	3,790	64.40%	2,095	35.60%	1,695	28.80%	5,885
Madison	1,688	58.94%	1,176	41.06%	512	17.88%	2,864
Mahoning	3,044	55.71%	2,420	44.29%	624	11.42%	5,464
Marion	1,520	46.91%	1,720	53.09%	-200	-6.17%	3,240
Medina	2,936	64.29%	1,631	35.71%	1,305	28.57%	4,567
Meigs	3,522	70.68%	1,461	29.32%	2,061	41.36%	4,983
Mercer	834	30.21%	1,927	69.79%	-1,093	-39.59%	2,761
Miami	3,821	61.94%	2,348	38.06%	1,473	23.88%	6,169
Monroe	1,440	31.03%	3,201	68.97%	-1,761	-37.94%	4,641
Montgomery	5,554	51.21%	5,291	48.79%	263	2.43%	10,845
Morgan	2,601	60.14%	1,724	39.86%	877	20.28%	4,325
Morrow	2,366	58.83%	1,656	41.17%	710	17.65%	4,022
Muskingum	4,422	53.16%	3,896	46.84%	526	6.32%	8,318
Noble	2,211	56.23%	1,721	43.77%	490	12.46%	3,932
Ottawa	823	49.31%	846	50.69%	-23	-1.38%	1,669
Paulding	805	69.10%	360	30.90%	445	38.20%	1,165
Perry	1,824	49.52%	1,859	50.48%	-35	-0.95%	3,683
Pickaway	2,215	46.67%	2,531	53.33%	-316	-6.66%	4,746
Pike	1,048	41.24%	1,493	58.76%	-445	-17.51%	2,541
Portage	3,475	64.40%	1,921	35.60%	1,554	28.80%	5,396
Preble	2,687	61.25%	1,700	38.75%	987	22.50%	4,387
Putnam	1,120	39.53%	1,713	60.47%	-593	-20.93%	2,833
Richland	3,194	48.41%	3,404	51.59%	-210	-3.18%	6,598
Ross	3,380	51.34%	3,204	48.66%	176	2.67%	6,584
Sandusky	2,294	49.09%	2,379	50.91%	-85	-1.82%	4,673
Scioto	2,806	57.78%	2,050	42.22%	756	15.57%	4,856
Seneca	3,042	48.08%	3,285	51.92%	-243	-3.84%	6,327
Shelby	1,602	44.18%	2,024	55.82%	-422	-11.64%	3,626
Stark	4,797	52.84%	4,282	47.16%	515	5.67%	9,079
Summit	4,204	69.88%	1,812	30.12%	2,392	39.76%	6,016
Trumbull	5,093	72.83%	1,900	27.17%	3,193	45.66%	6,993
Tuscarawas	3,049	49.47%	3,114	50.53%	-65	-1.05%	6,163
Union	2,233	63.87%	1,263	36.13%	970	27.75%	3,496
Van Wert	1,214	50.44%	1,193	49.56%	21	0.87%	2,407
Vinton	1,212	47.42%	1,344	52.58%	-132	-5.16%	2,556
Warren	3,911	70.84%	1,610	29.16%	2,301	41.68%	5,521
Washington	4,102	57.35%	3,050	42.65%	1,052	14.71%	7,152
Wayne	3,155	48.13%	3,400	51.87%	-245	-3.74%	6,555
Williams	2,154	60.27%	1,420	39.73%	734	20.54%	3,574
Wood	2,614	63.60%	1,496	36.40%	1,118	27.20%	4,110
Wyandot	1,730	47.94%	1,879	52.06%	-149	-4.13%	3,609
Totals	265,660	56.37%	205,590	43.63%	60,070	12.75%	471,250

== See also ==
- United States presidential elections in Ohio
