= 1844 United States presidential election in Ohio =

- November 1, 1844
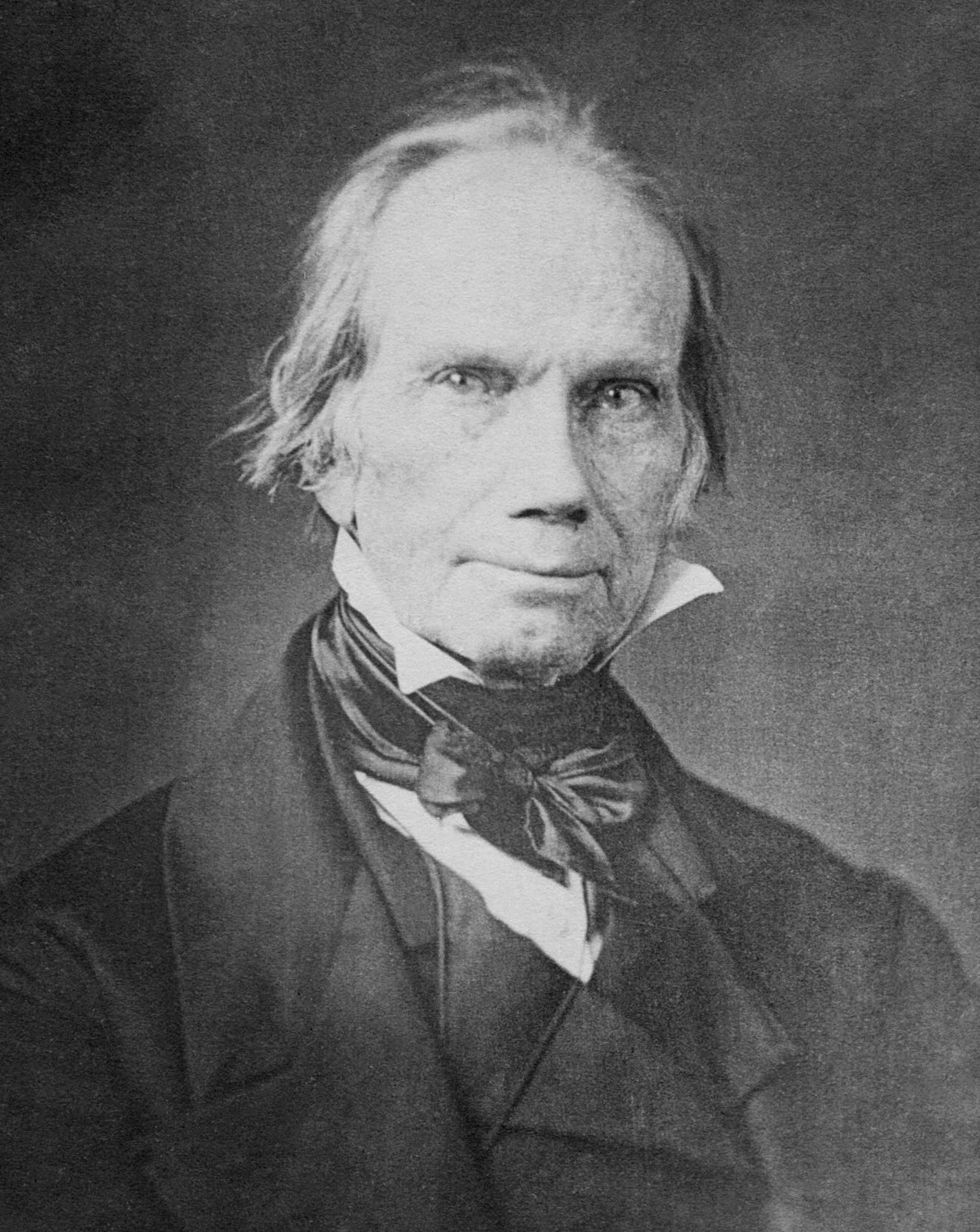

Nominee	Henry Clay	James K. Polk
Party	Whig	Democratic
Home state	Kentucky	Tennessee
Running mate	Theodore Frelinghuysen	George M. Dallas
Electoral vote	23	0
Popular vote	155,113	149,061
Percentage	49.68%	47.74%

Clay
40–50%
50–60%
60–70%
Polk
40–50%
50–60%
60–70%
70–80%
President before election
John Tyler
Independent
Elected President
James K. Polk
Democratic

A presidential election was held in Ohio on November 1, 1844 as part of the 1844 United States presidential election. Voters chose 23 representatives, or electors to the Electoral College, who voted for President and Vice President.

Ohio voted for the Whig candidate, Henry Clay, over Democratic candidate James K. Polk. Clay won Ohio by a narrow margin of 1.94%. This was last election where a Whig won Ohio.

== Results ==
1844 United States presidential election in Ohio
Party	Candidate	Running mate	Popular vote		Electoral vote	
Party	Candidate	Running mate	Count	%	Count	%
Whig	Henry Clay of Kentucky	Theodore Frelinghuysen of New York	155,113	49.68%	23	100.00%
Democratic	James K. Polk of Tennessee	George M. Dallas of Pennsylvania	149,061	47.74%	0	0.00%
Liberty	James G. Birney of Michigan	Thomas Morris of Ohio	8,050	2.58%	0	0.00%
Total			312,224	100.00%	23	100.00%

== See also ==
- United States presidential elections in Ohio
