= 1828 United States presidential election in Ohio =

- October 31 – December 2, 1828
- Turnout: 82.6% ▲44.3 pp

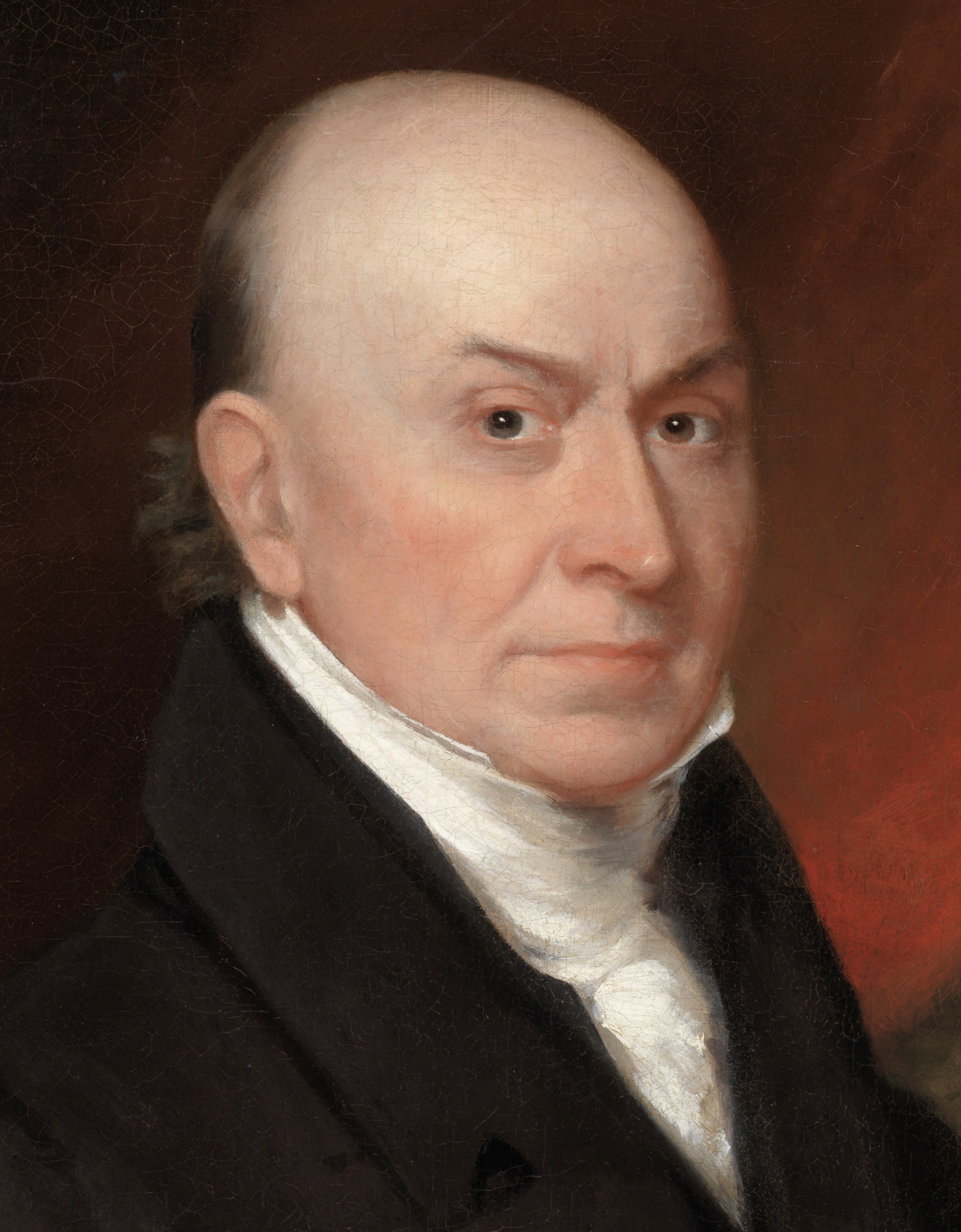
Nominee	Andrew Jackson	John Quincy Adams
Party	Democratic	National Republican
Home state	Tennessee	Massachusetts
Running mate	John C. Calhoun	Richard Rush
Electoral vote	16	0
Popular vote	67,595	63,394
Percentage	51.60%	48.40%
County results
Jackson
50–60%
60–70%
70–80%
Adams
50–60%
60–70%
70–80%
80–90%
90–100%
President before election
John Quincy Adams
Democratic-Republican
Elected President
Andrew Jackson
Democratic

The 1828 United States presidential election in Ohio took place between October 31 and December 2, 1828, as part of the 1828 United States presidential election. Voters chose 16 representatives, or electors to the Electoral College, who voted for President and Vice President.

Ohio voted for the Democratic candidate, Andrew Jackson, over the National Republican candidate, John Quincy Adams. Jackson won Ohio by a narrow margin of 3.2%. This was the first election of the Second Party System, and as such the first election in which Ohio voted for a candidate of a party other than the Democratic-Republicans.

== Results ==
1828 United States presidential election in Ohio
Party	Candidate	Votes	Percentage	Electoral votes
Democratic	Andrew Jackson	67,597	51.60%	16
National Republican	John Quincy Adams (incumbent)	63,396	48.40%	0
Totals		130,993	100.0%	16

== See also ==
- United States presidential elections in Ohio

== Bibliography ==
- Ratcliffe, Donald J. (Autumn 1987). "Voter Turnout in Early Ohio". Journal of the Early Republic. 7 (3): 223–51. JSTOR 3123782.
