= 1868 United States presidential election in Ohio =

- November 3, 1868
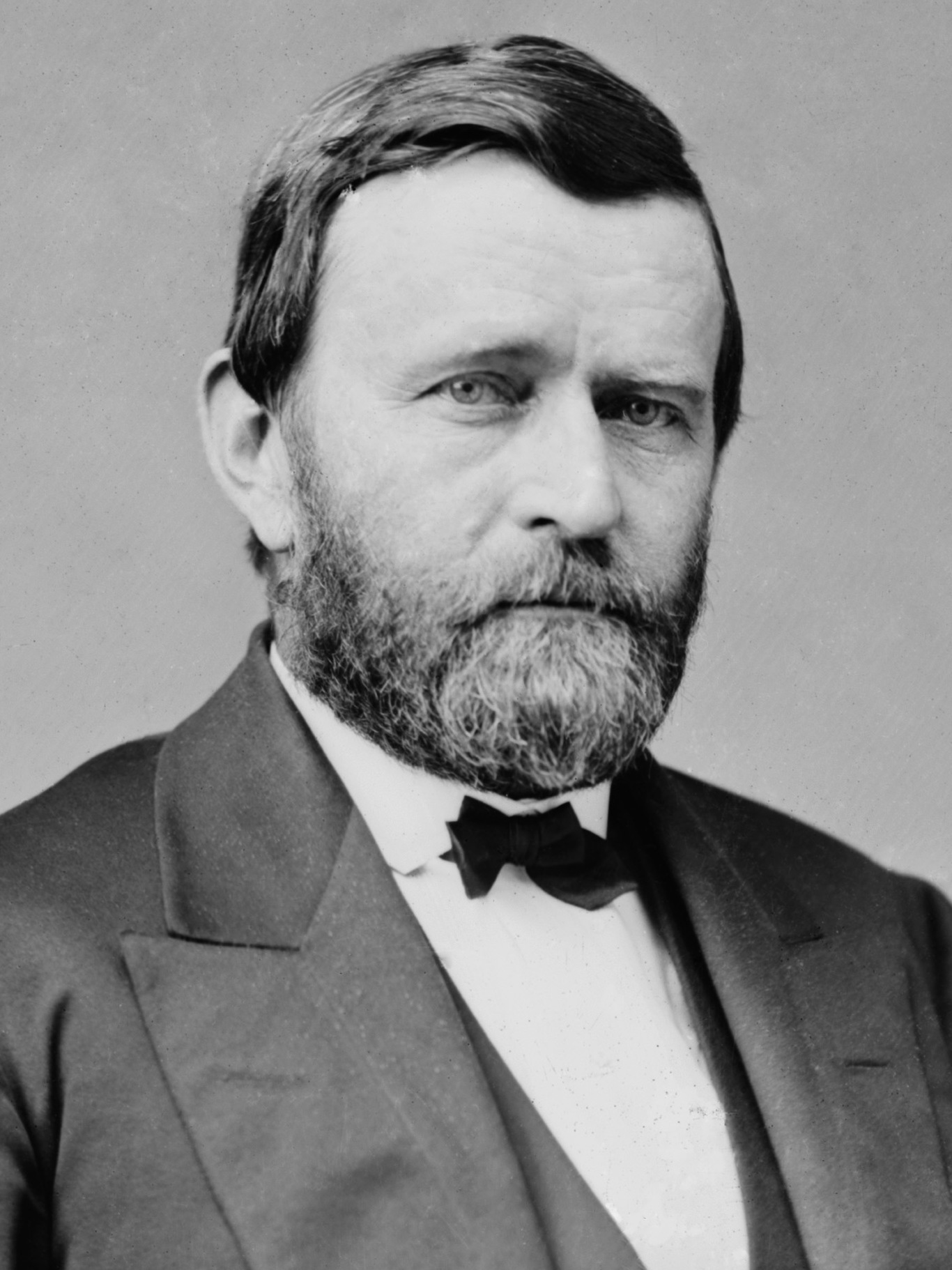

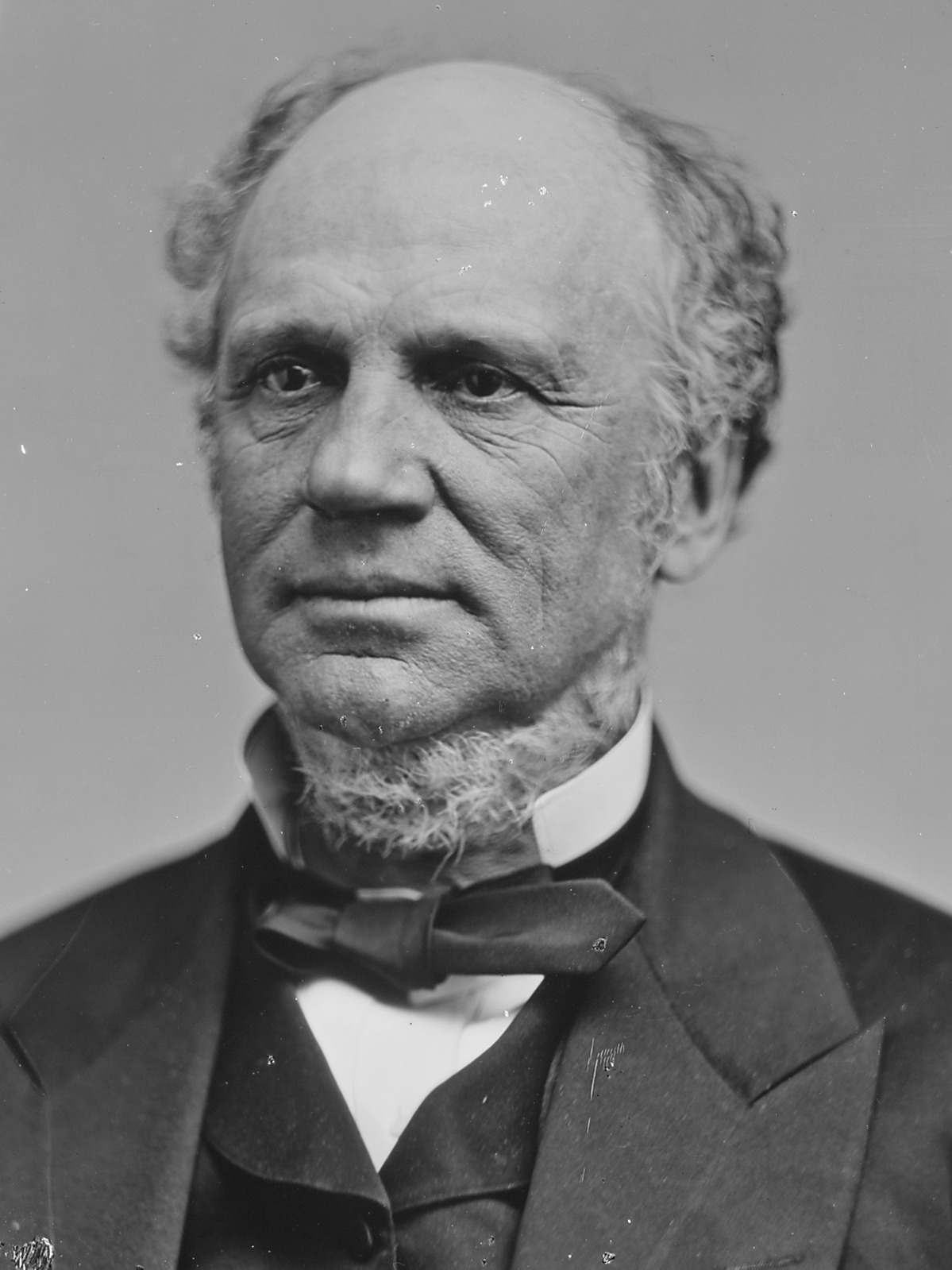
Nominee	Ulysses S. Grant	Horatio Seymour
Party	Republican	Democratic
Home state	Illinois	New York
Running mate	Schuyler Colfax	Francis Preston Blair Jr.
Electoral vote	21	0
Popular vote	280,167	238,621
Percentage	54.00%	46.00%
County results
Grant
50–60%
60–70%
70–80%
80–90%
Seymour
50–60%
60–70%
70–80%
President before election
Andrew Johnson
National Union
Elected President
Ulysses S. Grant
Republican

The 1868 United States presidential election in Ohio was held on November 3, 1868, as part of the 1868 United States presidential election. State voters chose 21 electors to the Electoral College, who voted for president and vice president.

Ohio was won by the Republican Party candidate, Ohio native and General Ulysses S. Grant, who won the state with 54.00% of the popular vote. The Democratic Party candidate, Horatio Seymour, garnered 46.00% of the popular vote. This was the first time that Ohio voted less Republican than South Carolina.

== Results ==
1868 United States presidential election in Ohio
Party	Candidate	Votes	Percentage	Electoral votes
Republican	Ulysses S. Grant	280,167	54.00%	21
Democratic	Horatio Seymour	238,621	46.00%	0
Totals		518,788	100.0%	21

=== Results by county ===
County	Ulysses S. Grant Republican		Horatio Seymour Democratic		Margin		Total votes cast
County	#	%	#	%	#	%	#
Adams	2,044	47.63%	2,247	52.37%	-203	-4.73%	4,291
Allen	1,892	42.15%	2,597	57.85%	-705	-15.71%	4,489
Ashland	2,205	46.83%	2,504	53.17%	-299	-6.35%	4,709
Ashtabula	6,108	81.35%	1,400	18.65%	4,708	62.71%	7,508
Athens	2,908	64.62%	1,592	35.38%	1,316	29.24%	4,500
Auglaize	1,266	31.49%	2,754	68.51%	-1,488	-37.01%	4,020
Belmont	3,893	50.20%	3,862	49.80%	31	0.40%	7,755
Brown	2,715	45.61%	3,238	54.39%	-523	-8.79%	5,953
Butler	3,298	40.01%	4,945	59.99%	-1,647	-19.98%	8,243
Carroll	1,807	58.37%	1,289	41.63%	518	16.73%	3,096
Champaign	2,954	58.01%	2,138	41.99%	816	16.03%	5,092
Clark	3,928	64.12%	2,198	35.88%	1,730	28.24%	6,126
Clermont	3,475	49.16%	3,594	50.84%	-119	-1.68%	7,069
Clinton	2,922	64.92%	1,579	35.08%	1,343	29.84%	4,501
Columbiana	4,881	62.42%	2,938	37.58%	1,943	24.85%	7,819
Coshocton	2,176	45.35%	2,622	54.65%	-446	-9.30%	4,798
Crawford	2,019	35.89%	3,607	64.11%	-1,588	-28.23%	5,626
Cuyahoga	12,582	61.15%	7,993	38.85%	4,589	22.30%	20,575
Darke	2,989	48.73%	3,145	51.27%	-156	-2.54%	6,134
Defiance	1,108	36.85%	1,899	63.15%	-791	-26.31%	3,007
Delaware	2,976	57.84%	2,169	42.16%	807	15.69%	5,145
Erie	3,130	62.43%	1,884	37.57%	1,246	24.85%	5,014
Fairfield	2,439	37.44%	4,076	62.56%	-1,637	-25.13%	6,515
Fayette	1,970	58.88%	1,376	41.12%	594	17.75%	3,346
Franklin	5,079	41.64%	7,119	58.36%	-2,040	-16.72%	12,198
Fulton	2,171	65.37%	1,150	34.63%	1,021	30.74%	3,321
Gallia	2,678	62.31%	1,620	37.69%	1,058	24.62%	4,298
Geauga	2,892	81.88%	640	18.12%	2,252	63.76%	3,532
Greene	4,233	69.83%	1,829	30.17%	2,404	39.66%	6,062
Guernsey	2,743	58.46%	1,949	41.54%	794	16.92%	4,692
Hamilton	24,167	56.29%	18,768	43.71%	5,399	12.57%	42,935
Hancock	2,279	47.41%	2,528	52.59%	-249	-5.18%	4,807
Hardin	1,884	51.62%	1,766	48.38%	118	3.23%	3,650
Harrison	2,267	58.32%	1,620	41.68%	647	16.65%	3,887
Henry	1,156	42.19%	1,584	57.81%	-428	-15.62%	2,740
Highland	3,038	51.60%	2,850	48.40%	188	3.19%	5,888
Hocking	1,369	39.34%	2,111	60.66%	-742	-21.32%	3,480
Holmes	1,083	27.47%	2,859	72.53%	-1,776	-45.05%	3,942
Huron	4,019	64.18%	2,243	35.82%	1,776	28.36%	6,262
Jackson	2,083	56.37%	1,612	43.63%	471	12.75%	3,695
Jefferson	3,394	61.59%	2,117	38.41%	1,277	23.17%	5,511
Knox	2,908	51.25%	2,766	48.75%	142	2.50%	5,674
Lake	2,909	76.59%	889	23.41%	2,020	53.19%	3,798
Lawrence	3,159	65.73%	1,647	34.27%	1,512	31.46%	4,806
Licking	3,487	44.03%	4,432	55.97%	-945	-11.93%	7,919
Logan	2,778	61.08%	1,770	38.92%	1,008	22.16%	4,548
Lorain	4,443	69.72%	1,930	30.28%	2,513	39.43%	6,373
Lucas	4,873	61.22%	3,087	38.78%	1,786	22.44%	7,960
Madison	1,682	52.04%	1,550	47.96%	132	4.08%	3,232
Mahoning	3,387	55.13%	2,757	44.87%	630	10.25%	6,144
Marion	1,548	44.43%	1,936	55.57%	-388	-11.14%	3,484
Medina	2,886	63.03%	1,693	36.97%	1,193	26.05%	4,579
Meigs	3,548	63.64%	2,027	36.36%	1,521	27.28%	5,575
Mercer	884	26.97%	2,394	73.03%	-1,510	-46.06%	3,278
Miami	3,958	59.82%	2,659	40.18%	1,299	19.63%	6,617
Monroe	1,443	29.81%	3,397	70.19%	-1,954	-40.37%	4,840
Montgomery	6,502	51.54%	6,113	48.46%	389	3.08%	12,615
Morgan	2,521	57.09%	1,895	42.91%	626	14.18%	4,416
Morrow	2,469	58.24%	1,770	41.76%	699	16.49%	4,239
Muskingum	4,677	50.78%	4,534	49.22%	143	1.55%	9,211
Noble	2,204	56.24%	1,715	43.76%	489	12.48%	3,919
Ottawa	963	42.48%	1,304	57.52%	-341	-15.04%	2,267
Paulding	834	57.24%	623	42.76%	211	14.48%	1,457
Perry	1,725	46.48%	1,986	53.52%	-261	-7.03%	3,711
Pickaway	2,176	44.40%	2,725	55.60%	-549	-11.20%	4,901
Pike	1,155	40.08%	1,727	59.92%	-572	-19.85%	2,882
Portage	3,604	60.41%	2,362	39.59%	1,242	20.82%	5,966
Preble	2,738	58.93%	1,908	41.07%	830	17.86%	4,646
Putnam	1,184	37.15%	2,003	62.85%	-819	-25.70%	3,187
Richland	3,300	46.78%	3,754	53.22%	-454	-6.44%	7,054
Ross	3,230	46.98%	3,645	53.02%	-415	-6.04%	6,875
Sandusky	2,443	46.19%	2,846	53.81%	-403	-7.62%	5,289
Scioto	2,904	57.00%	2,191	43.00%	713	13.99%	5,095
Seneca	2,977	45.68%	3,540	54.32%	-563	-8.64%	6,517
Shelby	1,626	41.69%	2,274	58.31%	-648	-16.62%	3,900
Stark	5,601	53.10%	4,948	46.90%	653	6.19%	10,549
Summit	4,634	65.47%	2,444	34.53%	2,190	30.94%	7,078
Trumbull	5,338	69.77%	2,313	30.23%	3,025	39.54%	7,651
Tuscarawas	3,145	47.82%	3,432	52.18%	-287	-4.36%	6,577
Union	2,361	61.89%	1,454	38.11%	907	23.77%	3,815
Van Wert	1,547	51.95%	1,431	48.05%	116	3.90%	2,978
Vinton	1,499	49.10%	1,554	50.90%	-55	-1.80%	3,053
Warren	3,917	67.63%	1,875	32.37%	2,042	35.26%	5,792
Washington	4,258	54.20%	3,598	45.80%	660	8.40%	7,856
Wayne	3,557	48.24%	3,816	51.76%	-259	-3.51%	7,373
Williams	2,280	55.69%	1,814	44.31%	466	11.38%	4,094
Wood	2,957	60.99%	1,891	39.01%	1,066	21.99%	4,848
Wyandot	1,734	44.19%	2,190	55.81%	-456	-11.62%	3,924
Totals	280,173	54.00%	238,620	46.00%	41,553	8.01%	518,793

== See also ==
- United States presidential elections in Ohio
