= 1884 United States presidential election in Ohio =

- November 4, 1884
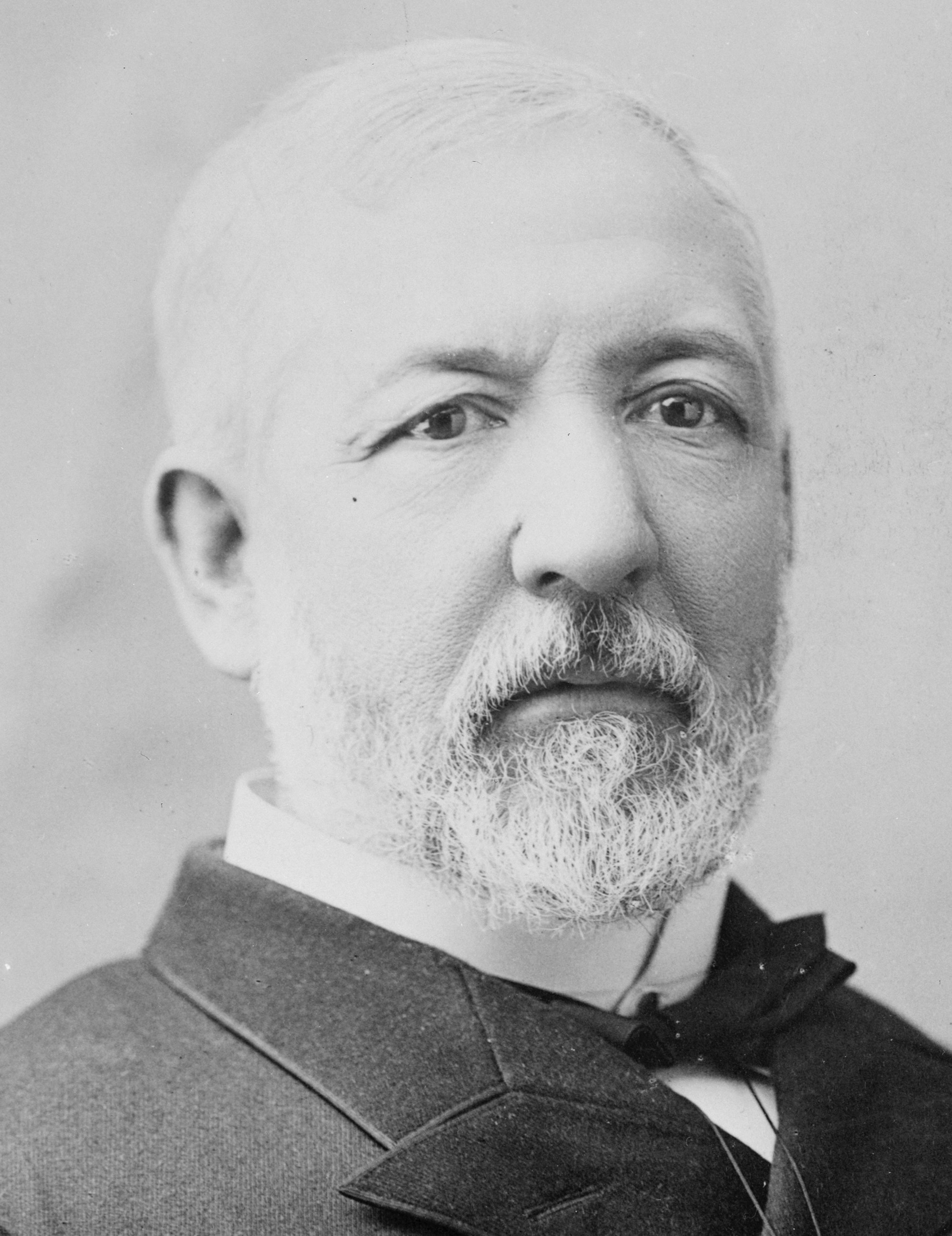

Nominee	James G. Blaine	Grover Cleveland
Party	Republican	Democratic
Home state	Maine	New York
Running mate	John A. Logan	Thomas A. Hendricks
Electoral vote	23	0
Popular vote	400,082	368,280
Percentage	50.99%	46.94%
County results
Blaine
40–50%
50–60%
60–70%
70–80%
Cleveland
40–50%
50–60%
60–70%
70–80%
President before election
Chester A. Arthur
Republican
Elected President
Grover Cleveland
Democratic

The 1884 United States presidential election in Ohio was held on November 4, 1884, as part of the 1884 United States presidential election. State voters chose 23 electors to the Electoral College, who voted for president and vice president.

Ohio was narrowly won by the Republican Party candidate, James G. Blaine, with 50.99% of the popular vote. The Democratic Party candidate, Grover Cleveland, garnered 46.94% of the popular vote.

== Results ==
1884 United States presidential election in Ohio
Party	Candidate	Votes	Percentage	Electoral votes
Republican	James G. Blaine	400,082	50.99%	23
Democratic	Grover Cleveland	368,280	46.94%	0
Prohibition	John St. John	11,069	1.41%	0
Greenback	Benjamin Butler	5,179	0.66%	0
Totals		784,610	100.0%	23

=== Results by county ===
County	James Gillespie Blaine Republican		Stephen Grover Cleveland Democratic		Various candidates Other parties		Margin		Total votes cast
County	#	%	#	%	#	%	#	%	#
Adams	2,833	49.05%	2,886	49.97%	57	0.99%	-53	-0.92%	5,776
Allen	3,372	42.67%	4,442	56.21%	89	1.13%	-1,070	-13.54%	7,903
Ashland	2,616	43.21%	3,325	54.92%	113	1.87%	-709	-11.71%	6,054
Ashtabula	7,269	69.41%	2,643	25.24%	560	5.35%	4,626	44.17%	10,472
Athens	3,828	59.21%	2,252	34.83%	385	5.96%	1,576	24.38%	6,465
Auglaize	2,026	34.21%	3,882	65.55%	14	0.24%	-1,856	-31.34%	5,922
Belmont	6,186	50.79%	5,763	47.32%	231	1.90%	423	3.47%	12,180
Brown	3,226	42.75%	4,272	56.61%	49	0.65%	-1,046	-13.86%	7,547
Butler	3,976	36.72%	6,751	62.34%	102	0.94%	-2,775	-25.62%	10,829
Carroll	2,314	55.88%	1,665	40.21%	162	3.91%	649	15.67%	4,141
Champaign	4,157	56.41%	3,078	41.77%	134	1.82%	1,079	14.64%	7,369
Clark	7,517	57.25%	5,204	39.64%	408	3.11%	2,313	17.62%	13,129
Clermont	4,242	49.26%	4,193	48.69%	177	2.06%	49	0.57%	8,612
Clinton	3,864	61.21%	2,284	36.18%	165	2.61%	1,580	25.03%	6,313
Columbiana	6,995	57.85%	4,472	36.99%	624	5.16%	2,523	20.86%	12,091
Coshocton	2,839	44.69%	3,469	54.60%	45	0.71%	-630	-9.91%	6,353
Crawford	2,731	35.40%	4,851	62.88%	133	1.72%	-2,120	-27.48%	7,715
Cuyahoga	24,052	55.15%	18,764	43.02%	797	1.83%	5,288	12.13%	43,613
Darke	4,390	44.29%	5,442	54.91%	79	0.80%	-1,052	-10.62%	9,911
Defiance	2,184	39.57%	3,288	59.58%	47	0.85%	-1,104	-20.00%	5,519
Delaware	3,513	50.55%	3,078	44.29%	359	5.17%	435	6.26%	6,950
Erie	3,507	45.51%	4,044	52.48%	155	2.01%	-537	-6.97%	7,706
Fairfield	3,210	38.94%	4,922	59.70%	112	1.36%	-1,712	-20.76%	8,244
Fayette	3,171	58.87%	2,160	40.10%	55	1.02%	1,011	18.77%	5,386
Franklin	11,194	47.68%	11,842	50.44%	441	1.88%	-648	-2.76%	23,477
Fulton	2,848	56.90%	1,904	38.04%	253	5.05%	944	18.86%	5,005
Gallia	3,690	60.67%	2,333	38.36%	59	0.97%	1,357	22.31%	6,082
Geauga	2,960	74.60%	824	20.77%	184	4.64%	2,136	53.83%	3,968
Greene	4,920	63.39%	2,624	33.81%	218	2.81%	2,296	29.58%	7,762
Guernsey	3,409	55.18%	2,570	41.60%	199	3.22%	839	13.58%	6,178
Hamilton	38,744	53.45%	33,248	45.87%	494	0.68%	5,496	7.58%	72,486
Hancock	3,245	47.32%	3,497	50.99%	116	1.69%	-252	-3.67%	6,858
Hardin	3,647	51.09%	3,373	47.25%	119	1.67%	274	3.84%	7,139
Harrison	2,765	55.39%	2,077	41.61%	150	3.00%	688	13.78%	4,992
Henry	1,982	37.86%	3,196	61.05%	57	1.09%	-1,214	-23.19%	5,235
Highland	3,683	50.84%	3,438	47.45%	124	1.71%	245	3.39%	7,245
Hocking	1,819	41.66%	2,426	55.57%	121	2.77%	-607	-13.91%	4,366
Holmes	1,366	28.57%	3,368	70.43%	48	1.00%	-2,002	-41.86%	4,782
Huron	4,650	56.01%	3,311	39.88%	341	4.11%	1,339	16.13%	8,302
Jackson	3,427	55.97%	2,575	42.05%	121	1.98%	852	13.92%	6,123
Jefferson	4,834	58.09%	3,283	39.45%	204	2.45%	1,551	18.64%	8,321
Knox	3,573	49.03%	3,530	48.44%	185	2.54%	43	0.59%	7,288
Lake	2,925	69.64%	1,120	26.67%	155	3.69%	1,805	42.97%	4,200
Lawrence	4,817	60.91%	3,024	38.24%	67	0.85%	1,793	22.67%	7,908
Licking	4,599	42.97%	5,958	55.67%	145	1.35%	-1,359	-12.70%	10,702
Logan	3,998	58.83%	2,625	38.63%	173	2.55%	1,373	20.20%	6,796
Lorain	5,478	60.30%	3,199	35.21%	408	4.49%	2,279	25.09%	9,085
Lucas	8,341	51.86%	7,384	45.91%	360	2.24%	957	5.95%	16,085
Madison	2,706	52.28%	2,391	46.19%	79	1.53%	315	6.09%	5,176
Mahoning	6,007	55.59%	4,432	41.01%	367	3.40%	1,575	14.58%	10,806
Marion	2,439	43.11%	3,118	55.12%	100	1.77%	-679	-12.01%	5,657
Medina	3,433	59.62%	2,135	37.08%	190	3.30%	1,298	22.54%	5,758
Meigs	4,177	60.39%	2,630	38.02%	110	1.59%	1,547	22.37%	6,917
Mercer	1,384	26.95%	3,728	72.59%	24	0.47%	-2,344	-45.64%	5,136
Miami	5,273	55.56%	4,084	43.03%	134	1.41%	1,189	12.53%	9,491
Monroe	1,645	28.99%	4,010	70.66%	20	0.35%	-2,365	-41.67%	5,675
Montgomery	11,524	50.12%	11,326	49.26%	143	0.62%	198	0.86%	22,993
Morgan	2,556	55.13%	1,972	42.54%	108	2.33%	584	12.60%	4,636
Morrow	2,612	52.39%	2,160	43.32%	214	4.29%	452	9.07%	4,986
Muskingum	5,896	50.25%	5,696	48.54%	142	1.21%	200	1.71%	11,734
Noble	2,385	52.27%	2,061	45.17%	117	2.56%	324	7.10%	4,563
Ottawa	1,575	36.07%	2,742	62.80%	49	1.12%	-1,167	-26.73%	4,366
Paulding	2,182	50.95%	2,082	48.61%	19	0.44%	100	2.33%	4,283
Perry	3,222	48.19%	3,114	46.57%	350	5.23%	108	1.62%	6,686
Pickaway	2,931	42.66%	3,889	56.60%	51	0.74%	-958	-13.94%	6,871
Pike	1,792	43.78%	2,238	54.68%	63	1.54%	-446	-10.90%	4,093
Portage	3,931	52.11%	3,273	43.39%	339	4.49%	658	8.72%	7,543
Preble	3,178	51.21%	2,817	45.39%	211	3.40%	361	5.82%	6,206
Putnam	2,194	35.11%	4,009	64.15%	46	0.74%	-1,815	-29.04%	6,249
Richland	4,018	42.93%	5,191	55.47%	150	1.60%	-1,173	-12.54%	9,359
Ross	4,830	50.30%	4,723	49.18%	50	0.52%	107	1.12%	9,603
Sandusky	3,130	45.10%	3,684	53.08%	126	1.82%	-554	-7.98%	6,940
Scioto	4,155	57.45%	2,990	41.34%	88	1.22%	1,165	16.11%	7,233
Seneca	4,004	43.72%	4,950	54.05%	205	2.24%	-946	-10.33%	9,159
Shelby	2,420	40.64%	3,496	58.71%	39	0.65%	-1,076	-18.07%	5,955
Stark	8,315	49.62%	7,955	47.47%	487	2.91%	360	2.15%	16,757
Summit	6,588	55.97%	4,586	38.96%	597	5.07%	2,002	17.01%	11,771
Trumbull	6,521	65.35%	3,000	30.07%	457	4.58%	3,521	35.28%	9,978
Tuscarawas	4,394	44.96%	5,215	53.36%	165	1.69%	-821	-8.40%	9,774
Union	3,515	59.51%	2,242	37.95%	150	2.54%	1,273	21.56%	5,907
Van Wert	3,052	50.43%	2,940	48.58%	60	0.99%	112	1.85%	6,052
Vinton	1,725	47.94%	1,852	51.47%	21	0.58%	-127	-3.53%	3,598
Warren	4,318	62.73%	2,481	36.05%	84	1.22%	1,837	26.68%	6,883
Washington	4,790	49.93%	4,667	48.65%	136	1.42%	123	1.28%	9,593
Wayne	4,497	47.05%	4,818	50.41%	242	2.53%	-321	-3.36%	9,557
Williams	2,907	48.62%	2,897	48.45%	175	2.93%	10	0.17%	5,979
Wood	4,549	53.06%	3,753	43.78%	271	3.16%	796	9.28%	8,573
Wyandot	2,380	43.05%	3,074	55.60%	75	1.36%	-694	-12.55%	5,529
Totals	400,082	50.99%	368,280	46.94%	16,248	2.07%	31,802	4.05%	784,610

== See also ==
- United States presidential elections in Ohio
