= 1804 United States presidential election in Ohio =

- November 4, 1804
- Turnout: 14.9%
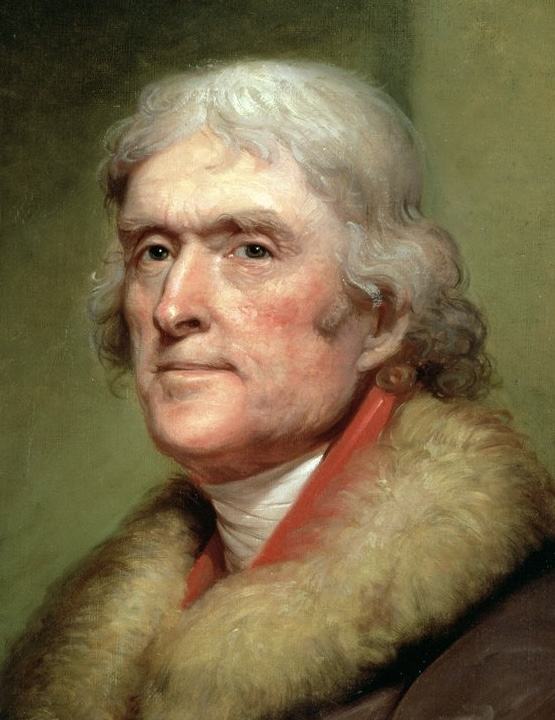

Nominee	Thomas Jefferson	Unpledged electors
Party	Democratic-Republican	Federalist
Home state	Virginia	N/A
Running mate	George Clinton	N/A
Electoral vote	3	0
Popular vote	2,593	364
Percentage	87.7%	12.3%
County results
Jefferson
80–90%
90–100%
No data
President before election
Thomas Jefferson
Democratic-Republican
Elected President
Thomas Jefferson
Democratic-Republican

A presidential election was held in Ohio on November 4, 1804, as part of the 1804 United States presidential election. The Democratic-Republican Party's ticket of incumbent president Thomas Jefferson and former New York governor George Clinton defeated the Federalist Party's ticket.

The Democratic-Republicans were eager to avoid a factional conflict following legislative elections in 1803, which saw a coalition of Federalists and dissident Democratic-Republicans win control of the Ohio House of Representatives. The Federalists proposed dividing the state into three single-member districts in order to improve their chances of winning any of the state's electoral votes, but the legislators ultimately rejected this plan in favor of choosing all three electors on a general ticket.

The Democratic-Republican members of the Ohio General Assembly held a caucus at Chillicothe, Ohio, in February and nominated three electors pledged to Jefferson. The Federalist Party nominated its ticket in a public meeting in Cincinnati; in an attempt to win support from the dissident Democratic-Republican faction, the meeting named a ticket that included both Federalists and Democratic-Republicans. Although a gathering of Federalist members of Congress had nominated Charles Cotesworth Pinckney for president in February, the Federalist electors remained formally unpledged. In contrast to the previous year, Ohio Democratic-Republicans displayed remarkable unity at the polls, and Jefferson carried the state by a nearly 7:1 margin.

== General election ==
=== Summary ===
Ohio chose three electors on a statewide general ticket. Nineteenth-century election laws required voters to elect the members of the Electoral College individually, rather than as a block. This sometimes resulted in small differences in the number of votes cast for electors pledged to the same presidential nominee, if some voters did not vote for all the electors nominated by a party. The following table compares the votes for the leading Democratic-Republican and Federalist electors to give an approximate sense of the statewide popular vote.

1804 United States presidential election in Ohio
Party	Candidate	Votes	%
Democratic-Republican	Thomas Jefferson George Clinton	2,594	87.69
Federalist	Unpledged electors	364	12.31
Total votes		2,957	100.00

=== Results ===
1804 United States presidential election in Ohio
Party	Candidate	Votes
Democratic-Republican	Nathaniel Massie	2,593
Democratic-Republican	William Goforth	2,502
Democratic-Republican	James Pritchard	2,475
Federalist	Bezaleel Wells	364
Federalist	John Riley	329
Federalist	Benjamin Ives Gilman	190
Federalist	John Carlisle	80
Democratic-Republican	John Bigger	76
Total votes		2,957

=== Results by county ===
1804 United States presidential election in Ohio by county
County	Thomas Jefferson Democratic-Republican		Unpledged electors Federalist		Margin		Total
County	Votes	%	Votes	%	Votes	%	Total
Adams	**		**		**		**
Belmont	**		**		**		**
Butler	**		**		**		**
Clermont	**		**		**		**
Columbiana	**		**		**		**
Fairfield	**		**		**		**
Franklin	**		**		**		**
Gallia	**		**		**		**
Greene	**		**		**		**
Hamilton	503	96.92	16	3.08	487	93.83	519
Jefferson	**		**		**		**
Montgomery	**		**		**		**
Muskingum	**		**		**		**
Ross (Note: Incomplete)	118	80.27	29	19.73	89	60.54	147
Scioto	**		**		**		**
Trumbull	**		**		**		**
Warren	**		**		**		**
Washington	**		**		**		**
TOTAL	621	93.24	45	6.76	576	86.49	666

== See also ==
- United States presidential elections in Ohio

== Bibliography ==
- Dauer, Manning Julian (2002). "Election of 1804". In Schlesinger, Arthur M. Jr.; Israel, Fred L. (eds.). History of American Presidential Elections, 1789–2001. Vol. 1. Philadelphia: Chelsea House Publishers. pp. 159–82.
- Lampi, Philip J. (n.d.). "Electoral College". A New Nation Votes. American Antiquarian Society.
- Lampi, Philip J. (2012). "Ohio 1804 Electoral College". A New Nation Votes. American Antiquarian Society.
- Ratcliffe, Donald J. (1998). Party Spirit in a Frontier Republic: Democratic Politics in Ohio, 1793–1821. Columbus: Ohio State University Press.
- Ratcliffe, Donald J. (Autumn 1987). "Voter Turnout in Early Ohio". Journal of the Early Republic. 7 (3): 223–51.
