= 1836 United States presidential election in Ohio =

- November 4, 1836
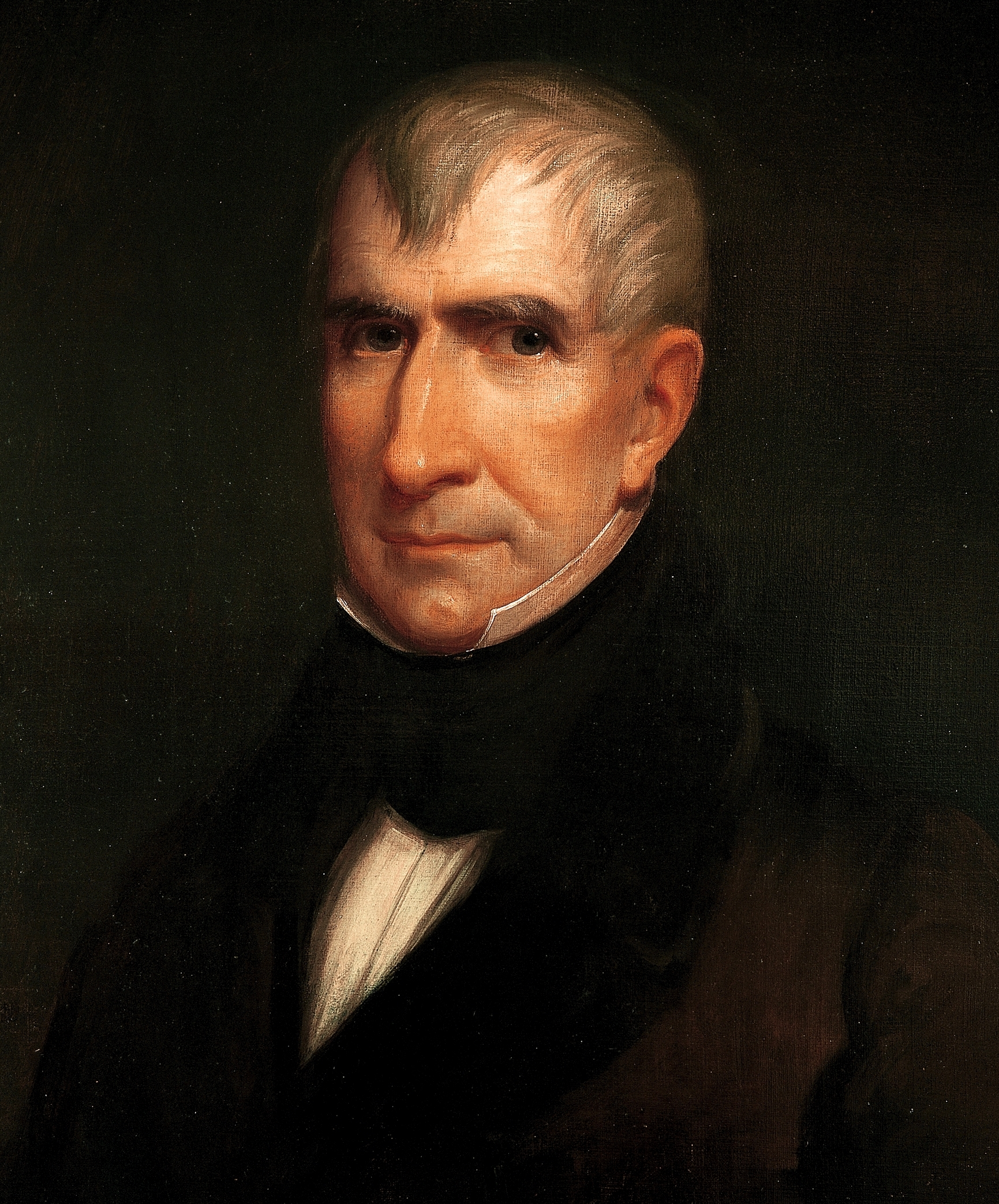

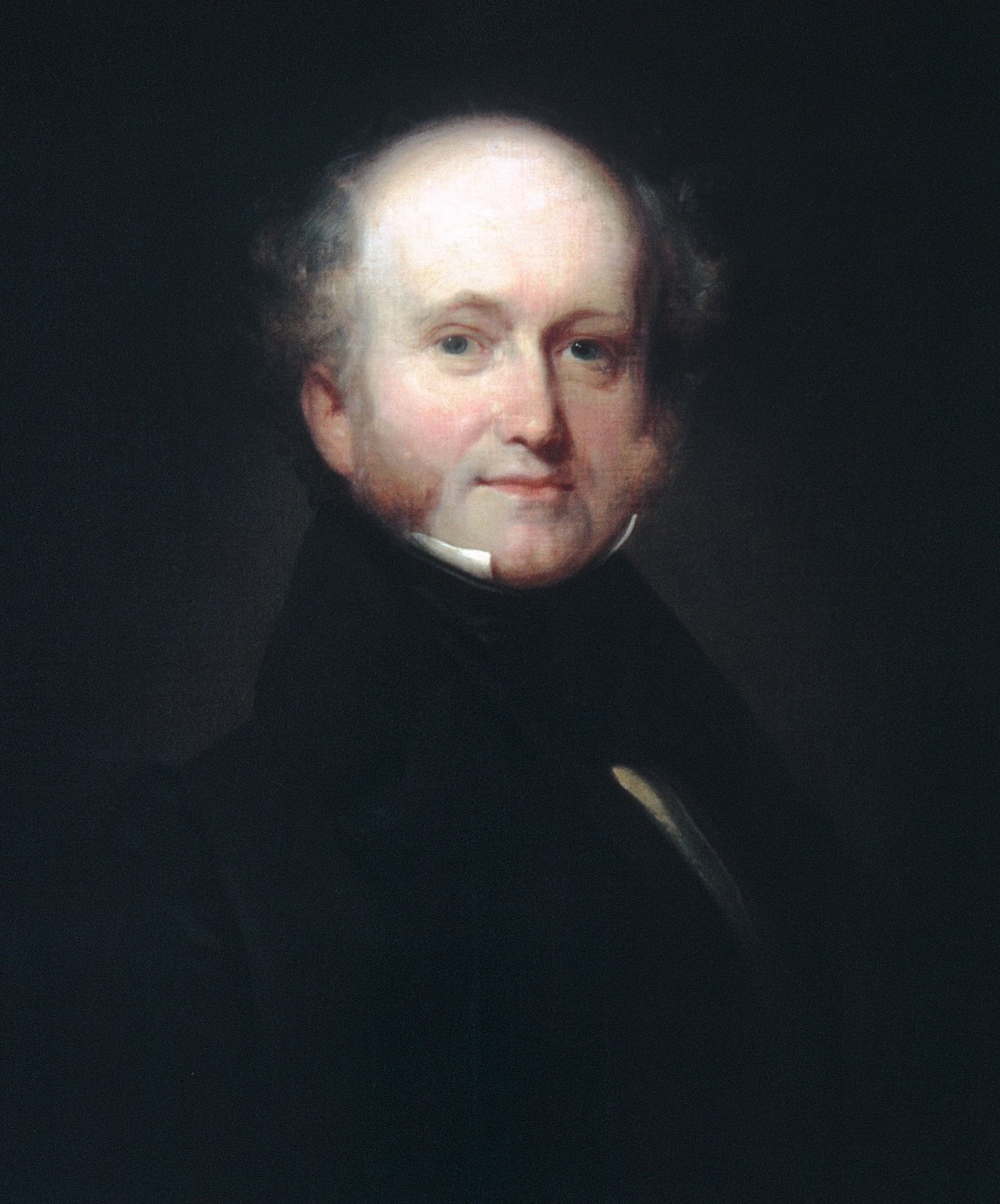
Nominee	William Henry Harrison	Martin Van Buren
Party	Whig	Democratic
Home state	Ohio	New York
Running mate	Francis Granger	Richard Mentor Johnson
Electoral vote	21	0
Popular vote	104,958	96,238
Percentage	51.87%	47.56%
County results
Harrison
50–60%
60–70%
70–80%
Van Buren
50–60%
60–70%
70–80%
No Votes
No data
President before election
Andrew Jackson
Democratic
Elected President
Martin Van Buren
Democratic

A presidential election was held in Ohio on November 4, 1836 as part of the 1836 United States presidential election. Voters chose twenty-one representatives, or electors to the Electoral College, who voted for President and Vice President.

Ohio voted for Whig candidate William Henry Harrison over Democratic candidate Martin Van Buren. Harrison won Ohio by a narrow margin of 4.31%. Ohio was the home state of William Henry Harrison.

== Results ==
1836 United States presidential election in Ohio
Party	Candidate	Running mate	Popular vote		Electoral vote	
Party	Candidate	Running mate	Count	%	Count	%
Whig	William Henry Harrison of Ohio	Francis Granger of New York	104,958	51.87%	21	100.00%
Democratic	Martin Van Buren of New York	Richard Mentor Johnson of Kentucky	96,238	47.56%	0	0.00%
N/A	Others	Others	1,137	0.56%	0	0.00%
Total			202,333	100.00%	21	100.00%

== See also ==
- United States presidential elections in Ohio
