= 1808 United States presidential election in Massachusetts =

- November 1–8, 1808
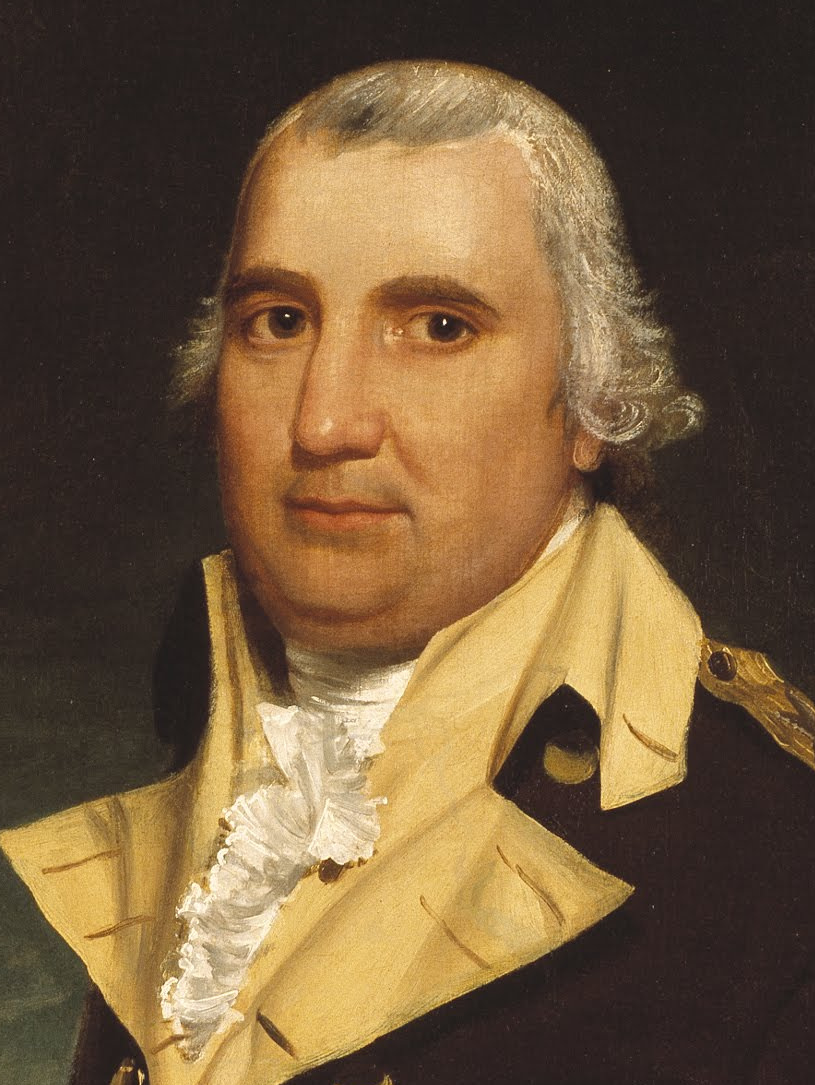
Nominee	Charles Cotesworth Pinckney
Party	Federalist
Home state	South Carolina
Running mate	Rufus King
Electoral vote	19
Popular vote	–
Percentage	100%
President before election
Thomas Jefferson
Democratic-Republican
Elected President
James Madison
Democratic-Republican

The 1808 United States presidential election in Massachusetts took place between November 1 and 8, 1808, as part of the 1808 United States presidential election. The state legislature appointed 19 representatives, or electors to the Electoral College, who voted for president and vice president.

During this election, the Federalist candidate Charles Cotesworth Pinckney along with his running mate Rufus King ran unopposed in the state. However, both would ultimately lose the election nationally to the chosen Democratic-Republican candidate James Madison and his running mate George Clinton.

== Results ==
1808 United States presidential election in Massachusetts
Party	Candidate	Votes	Percentage	Electoral votes
Federalist	Charles Cotesworth Pinckney	–	–	19
Totals		–	100.0%	19

1808 vice presidential electoral vote		
Party	Candidate	Electoral votes
Federalist	Rufus King	19
Totals		19

== See also ==
- United States presidential elections in Massachusetts
