= 1808 United States presidential election in Maryland =

- 1808
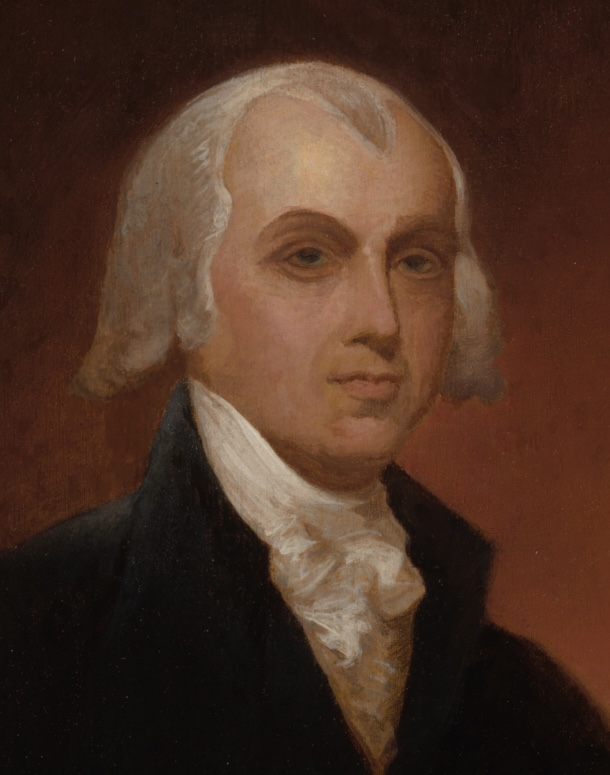

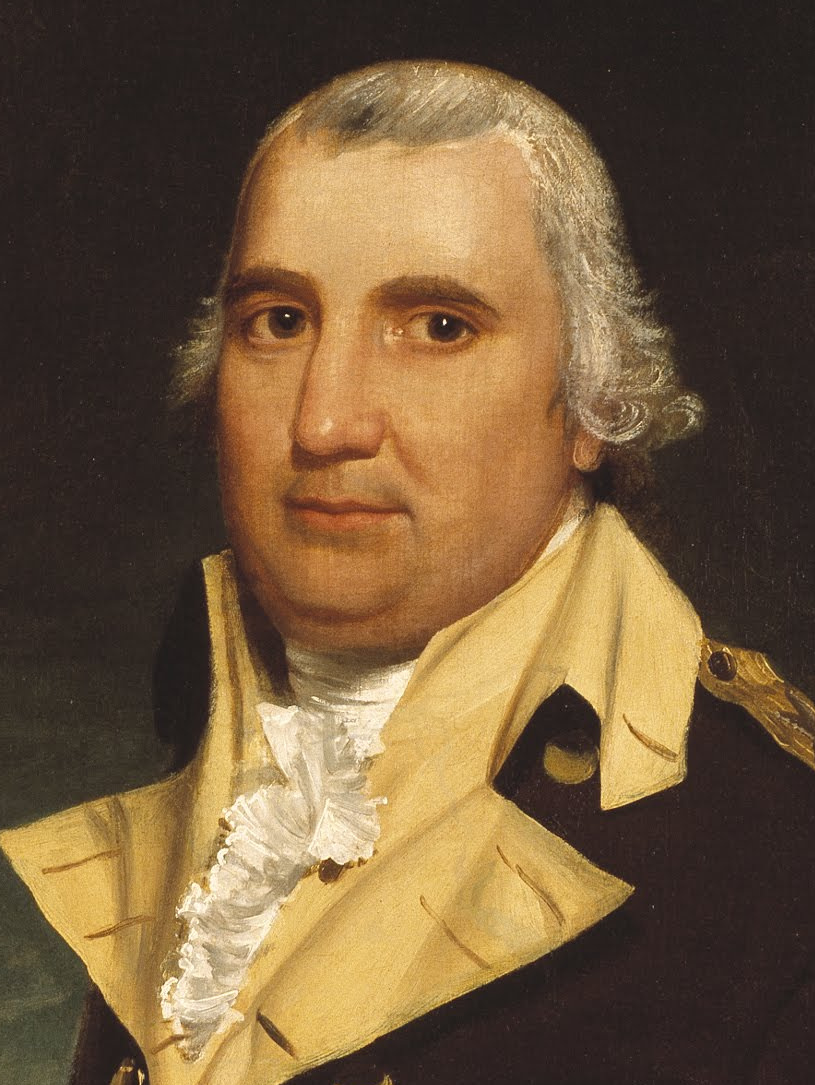
Nominee	James Madison	Charles Cotesworth Pinckney
Party	Democratic-Republican	Federalist
Home state	Virginia	South Carolina
Electoral vote	9	2
Popular vote	15,336	8,886
Percentage	63.31%	36.69%
County results
Madison
50–60%
60–70%
70–80%
80–90%
90–100%
Pinckney
50–60%
60–70%
70–80%
90–100%
President before election
Thomas Jefferson
Democratic-Republican
Elected President
James Madison
Democratic-Republican

The 1808 United States presidential election in Maryland took place on an unknown date as part of the 1808 United States presidential election. Voters chose eleven representatives, or electors, to the Electoral College, who voted for president and vice president.

Early elections were quite different from modern ones. Voters in Maryland voted for individual electors, who were pledged to vote for certain candidates. Often, which candidate an elector intended to support was unclear. Prior to the ratification of the 12th amendment, each elector did not distinguish between a vote cast for president and vice president, and simply cast two votes.

Starting with the 1796 United States presidential election and ending with the 1824 United States presidential election, Maryland used an electoral district system to choose its electors, with each district electing a single elector. This method is similar to the way Nebraska and Maine choose their electors in modern elections.

== Results ==
Presidential candidate	Party	Home state	Popular vote		Electoral vote
Presidential candidate	Party	Home state	Count	Percentage	Electoral vote
James Madison	Democratic-Republican	Virginia	15,336	63.31%	9
Charles Cotesworth Pinckney	Federalist	South Carolina	8,886	36.69%	2
Total			24,222	100.00%	11

=== Results by electoral district ===
Results by district
District	James Madison Democratic-Republican			Charles Cotesworth Pinckney Federalist			Other			Margin		Total votes cast
District	#	%	Electors	#	%	Electors	#	%	Electors	#	%	Total votes cast
1	27	3.32%	0	781	96.30%	1	3	0.36%	0	-751	-92.62%	811
2	1,268	51.60%	1	1,189	48.40%	0	0	0.00%	0	79	3.20%	2,457
3	7,241	95.64%	2	308	4.06%	0	22	0.30%	0	6,911	91.28%	7,571
4	8,707	52.81%	2	7,776	47.17%	0	2	0.02%	0	929	5.62%	16,485
5	1,673	93.98%	1	107	6.02%	0	0	0%	0	1,566	87.96%	1,780
6	1,678	82.29%	1	361	17.71%	0	0	0%	0	1,317	64.58%	2,039
7	890	99.10%	1	0	0.00%	0	8	0.90%	0	890	98.2%	898
8	1,287	57.58%	1	948	42.42%	0	0	0.00%	0	339	15.16%	2,235
9	539	27.33%	0	1,433	72.67%	1	0	0.00%	0	-894	-45.34%	1,972
Total	15,336	63.31%	9	8,886	36.69%	2	35	0.54%	0	6,450	26.62%	24,222

=== Results by county ===
County	James Madison Democratic-Republican		Charles Cotesworth Pinckney Federalist		Other		Margin		Total votes cast
County	#	%	#	%	#	%	#	%	Total votes cast
Allegany	207	36.25%	364	63.75%	0	0%	-157	-27.50%	571
Anne Arundel	618	97.94%	13	2.06%	0	0.00%	615	95.88%	631
Baltimore (City and County)	4,510	97.45%	118	2.55%	0	0%	4,392	94.90%	4,628
Calvert	339	46.57%	389	53.43%	0	0.00%	-50	-6.86%	728
Caroline	559	62.25%	339	37.75%	0	0.00%	220	24.50%	898
Cecil	682	77.41%	199	22.59%	0	0.00%	483	54.82%	881
Charles	10	2.54%	383	97.46%	0	0.00%	-373	-94.92%	393
Dorchester	282	42.92%	375	57.08%	0	0.00%	-93	-14.16%	657
Frederick	2,471	51.35%	2,341	48.65%	0	0.00%	130	2.70%	4,812
Harford	996	86.01%	162	13.99%	0	0.00%	834	72.02%	1,158
Kent	459	100.00%	0	0.00%	0	0.00%	459	100.00%	459
Montgomery	483	49.85%	486	50.15%	0	0.00%	-3	-0.30%	969
Prince George's	627	54.38%	526	45.62%	0	0.00%	101	8.76%	1,153
Queen Anne's	431	100.00%	0	0.00%	0	0.00%	431	100.00%	431
St. Mary's	0	0.00%	321	100.00%	0	0.00%	-321	-100.00%	321
Somerset	167	22.54%	574	77.46%	0	0.00%	-407	-54.92%	741
Talbot	536	50.71%	521	49.29%	0	0.00%	266	55.18%	482
Washington	1,525	58.90%	1,064	41.10%	0	0.00%	461	17.80%	2,589
Worcester	292	33.80%	572	66.20%	0	0.00%	-280	-32.40%	864
Total	15,194	63.46%	8,747	36.53%	0	0.00%	6,447	26.93%	23,941

==== Counties that flipped from Democratic-Republican to Federalist ====
- Allegany
- Calvert
- Montgomery

== See also ==
- United States presidential elections in Maryland
- 1808 United States presidential election
- 1808 United States elections
