= 1808 United States presidential election in Kentucky =

- November 4 – December 7, 1808
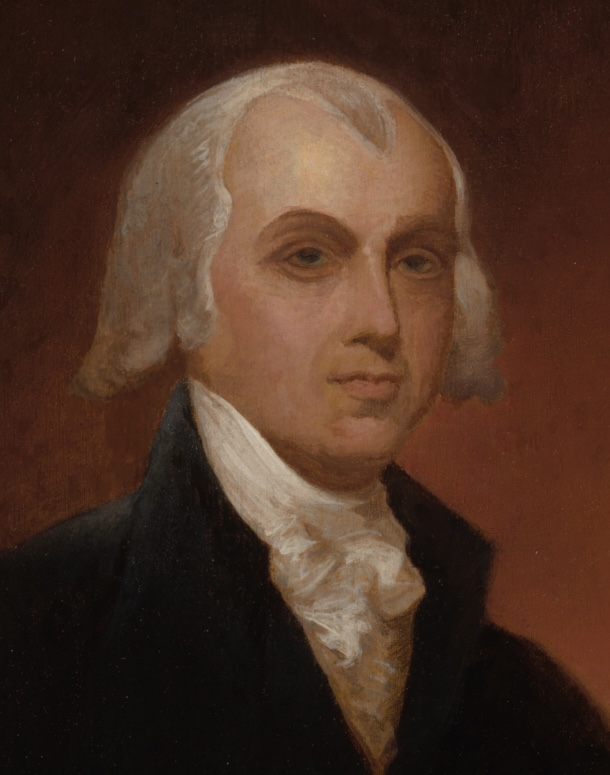

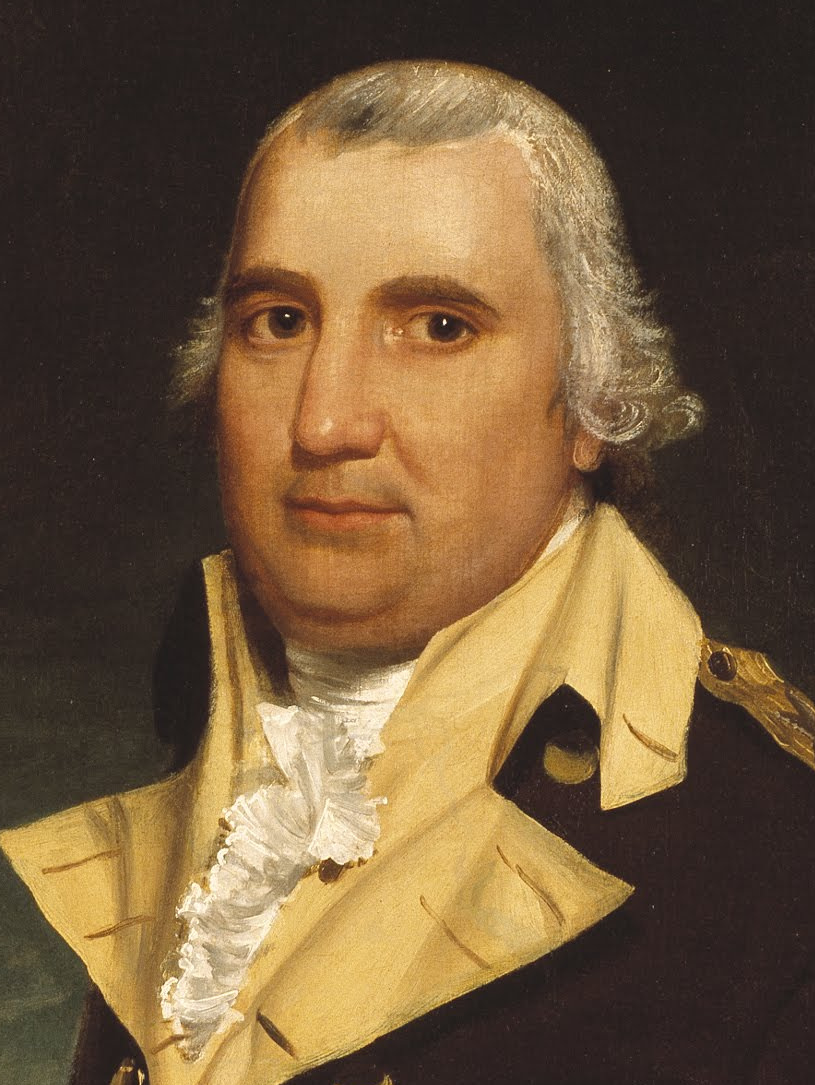
Nominee	James Madison	Charles Cotesworth Pinckney
Party	Democratic-Republican	Federalist
Home state	Virginia	South Carolina
Running mate	George Clinton	Rufus King
Electoral vote	7	0
Popular vote	2,679	54
Percentage	98.02%	1.98%

The 1808 United States presidential election in Kentucky took place between November 4 and December 7, 1808, as part of the 1808 United States presidential election. Voters chose eight representatives, or electors to the Electoral College, who voted for President and Vice President.

Kentucky cast seven electoral votes, as one elector didn't vote, for the Democratic-Republican candidate James Madison over the Federalist candidate Charles Cotesworth Pinckney. The electoral votes for Vice President were cast for Madison's running mate George Clinton from New York. The state was divided into two electoral districts with four electors each, whereupon each district's voters chose the electors.

== Results ==
1808 United States presidential election in Kentucky
Party	Candidate	Votes	Percentage	Electoral votes
Democratic-Republican	James Madison	2,679	98.02%	7
Federalist	Charles Cotesworth Pinckney	54	1.98%	0
None	Not Cast	–	–	1
Totals		2,733	100.0%	8

== See also ==
- United States presidential elections in Kentucky
