= 1808 United States presidential election in Virginia =

Virginia in the 6th presidential election

- November 4 – December 7, 1808
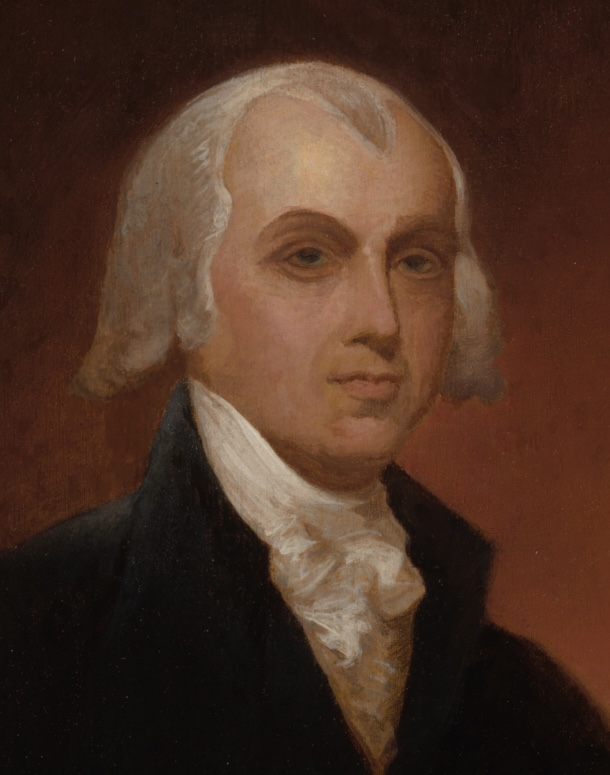

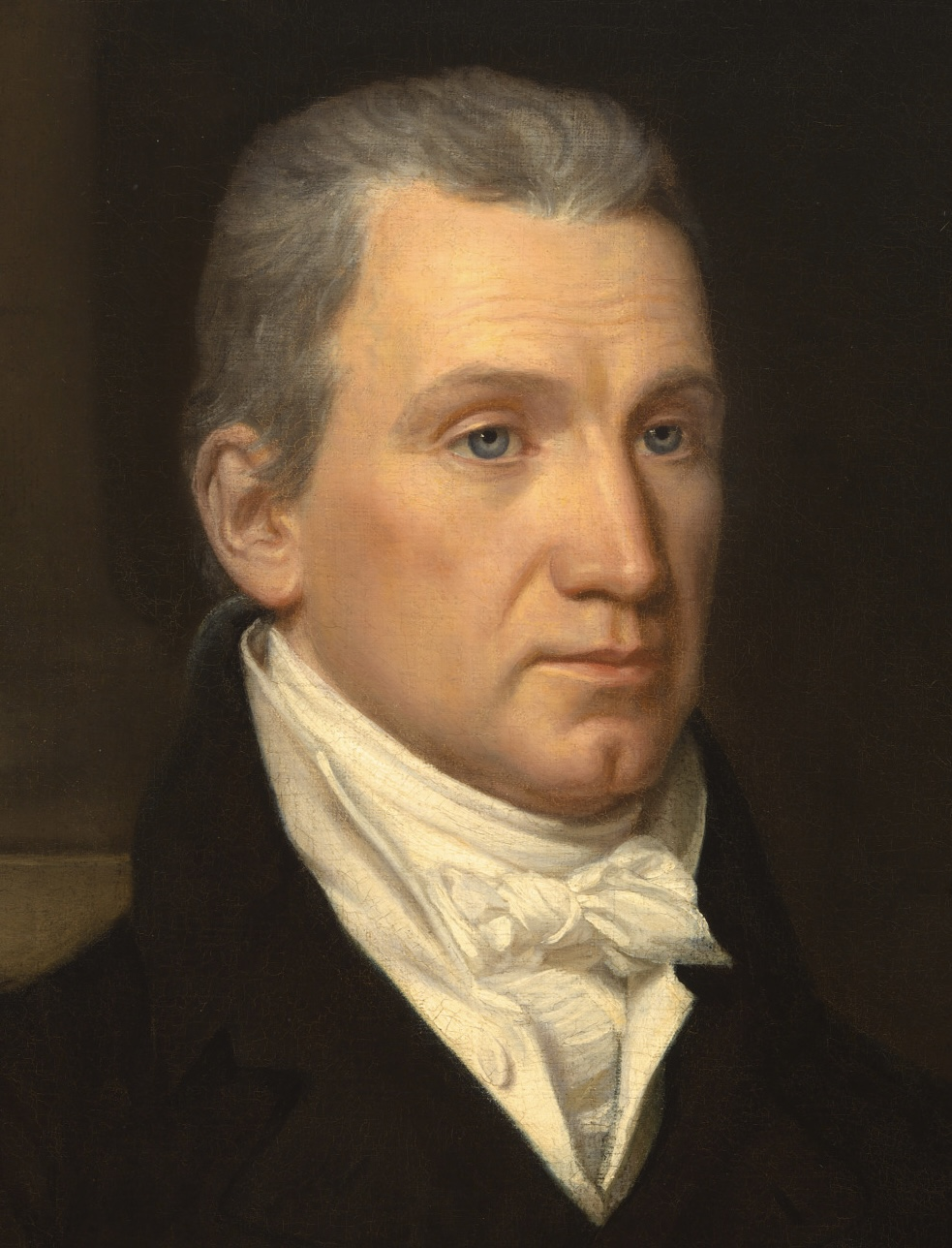

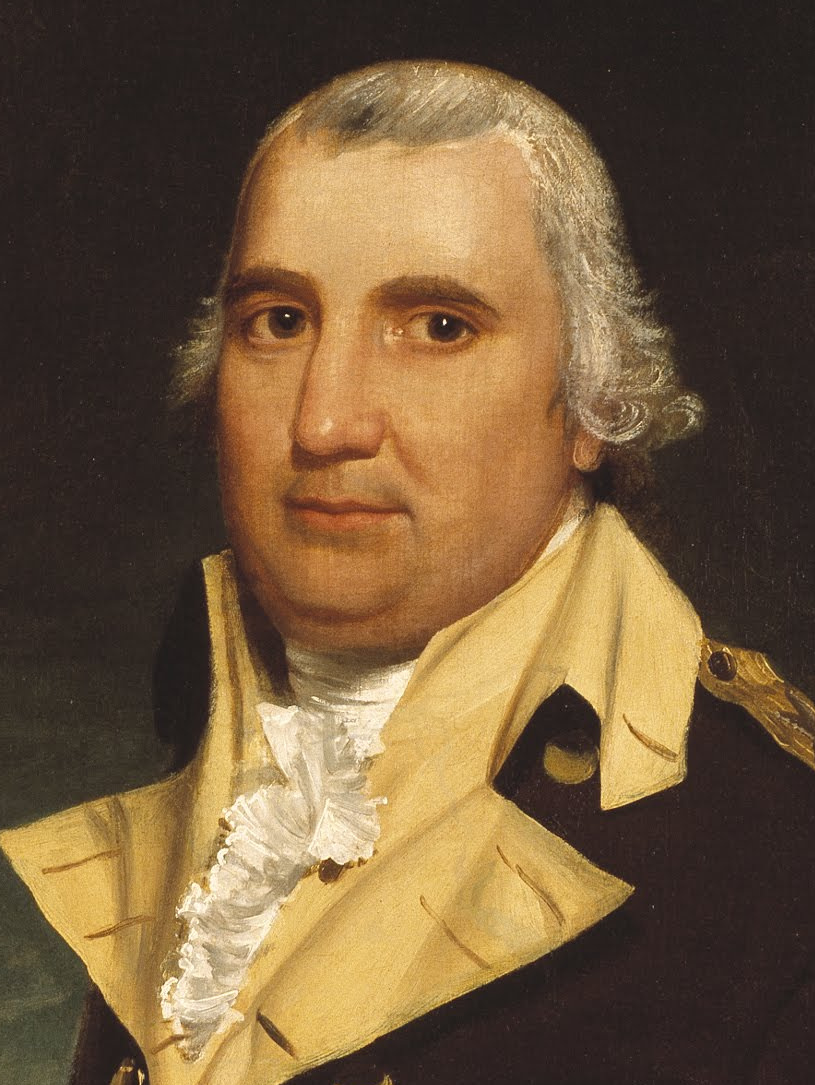
Nominee	James Madison	James Monroe	Charles Cotesworth Pinckney
Party	Democratic-Republican	Democratic-Republican	Federalist
Home state	Virginia	Virginia	South Carolina
Running mate	George Clinton	none	Rufus King
Electoral vote	24	0	0
Popular vote	15,683	3,505	761
Percentage	78.62%	17.57%	3.81%
County results
Madison
50–60%
60–70%
70–80%
80–90%
90–100%
Monroe
50–60%
60–70%
70–80%
90–100%
No data/vote
President before election
Thomas Jefferson
Democratic-Republican
Elected President
James Madison
Democratic-Republican

The 1808 United States presidential election in Virginia was held between November 4 and December 7, 1808, as part of the 1808 United States presidential election. Virginia voters chose 24 representatives, or electors, to the Electoral College, who voted for president and vice president.

Democratic-Republican Secretary of State James Madison won in a landslide victory with 78.6% of the popular vote plus 24 electoral votes, compared to 3.8% of Federalist Minister to France Charles Cotesworth Pinckney and 17.6% of Minister to the United Kingdom James Monroe, who would become the 5th president of the United States in 1817.

== Results ==
1808 United States presidential election in Virginia
Party	Candidate	Votes	Percentage	Electoral votes
Democratic-Republican	James Madison	15,683	78.62%	24
Democratic-Republican	James Monroe	3,505	17.57%	0
Federalist	Charles Cotesworth Pinckney	761	3.81%	0
Totals		19,949	100.00%	24

== See also ==
- United States presidential elections in Virginia
