= 1808 United States presidential election in North Carolina =

- November 4 – December 7, 1808
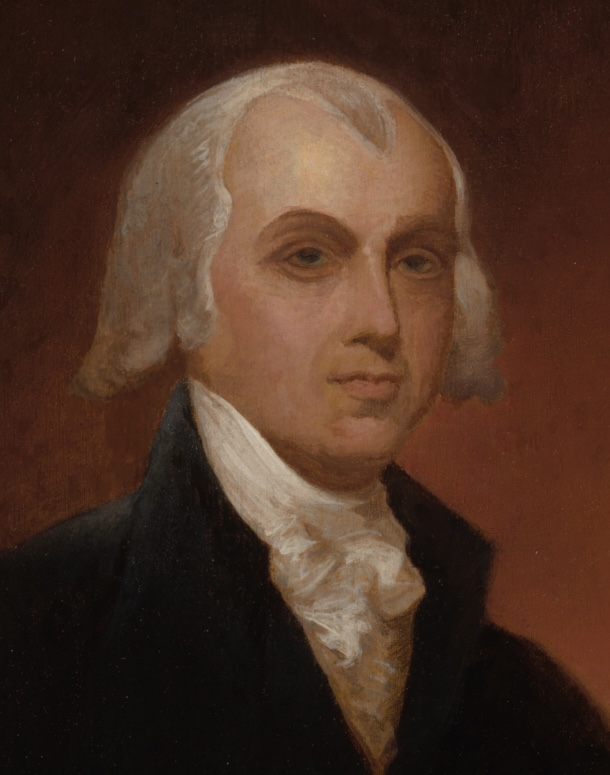

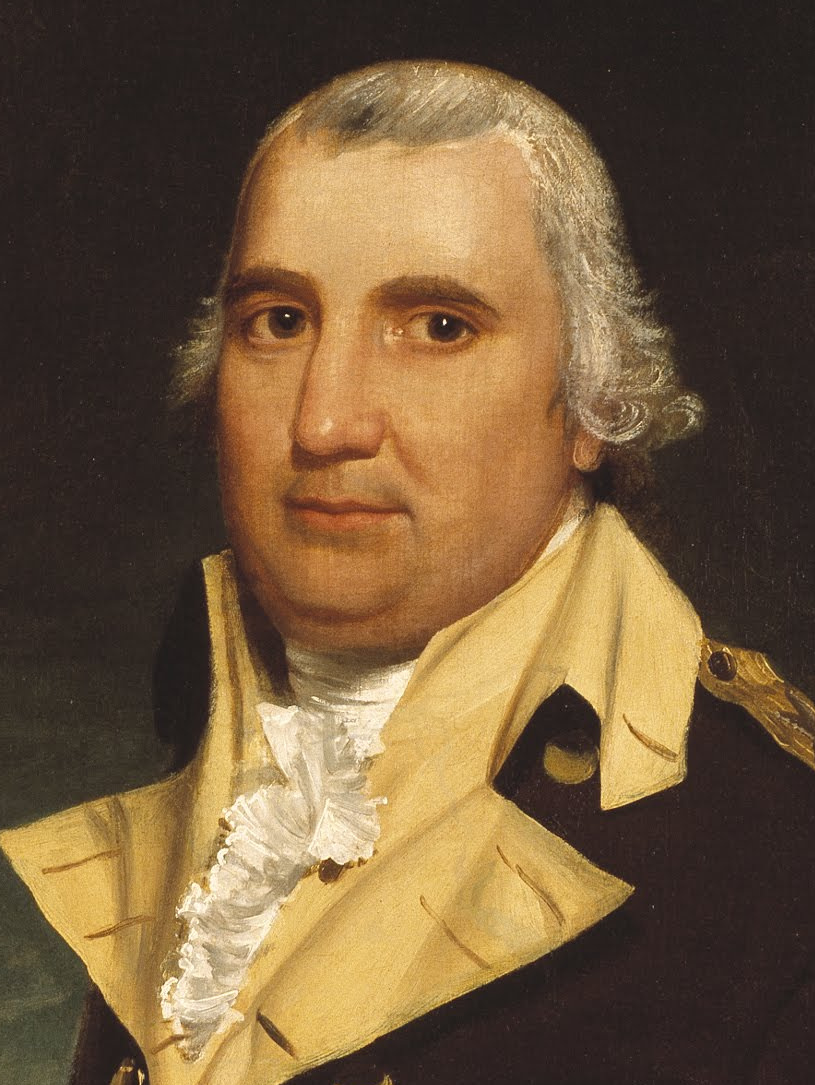

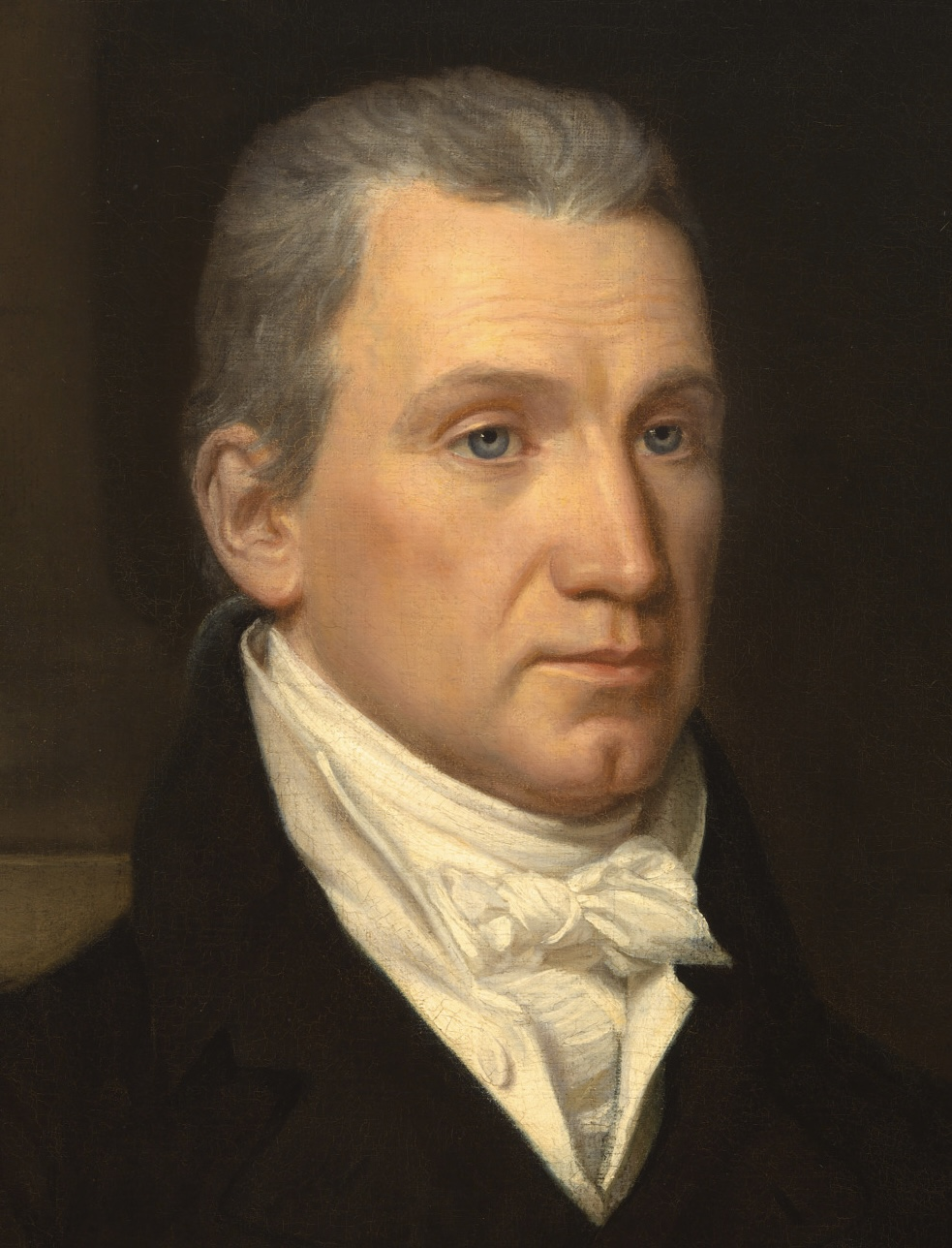
Nominee	James Madison	Charles Cotesworth Pinckney	James Monroe
Party	Democratic-Republican	Federalist	Democratic-Republican
Home state	Virginia	South Carolina	Virginia
Electoral vote	11	3
Popular vote	8,829	7,523	931
Percentage	51.08%	43.53%	5.39%
County results
Madison
50–60%
60–70%
70–80%
80–90%
90–100%
Pinckney
50–60%
60–70%
70–80%
90–100%
Monroe
60–70%
No Data/Vote
President before election
Thomas Jefferson
Democratic-Republican
Elected President
James Madison
Democratic-Republican

The 1808 United States presidential election in North Carolina took place between November 4 and December 7, 1808, as part of the 1808 United States presidential election. North Carolina voters chose fourteen representatives, or electors, to the Electoral College, who voted for president and vice president.

North Carolina voted for the Democratic-Republican candidate James Madison over the Federalist candidate Charles Cotesworth Pinckney and Democratic-Republican James Monroe, who would become president following Madison.

North Carolina used an electoral district system to choose its electors, with each district electing a single elector. This is similar to the way Nebraska and Maine choose their electors in modern elections.

== Results ==
1808 United States presidential election in North Carolina
Party	Candidate	Votes	Percentage	Electoral votes
Democratic-Republican	James Madison	8,829	51.08%	11
Federalist	Charles Cotesworth Pinckney	7,523	43.53%	3
Democratic-Republican	James Monroe	931	5.39%	
Totals		17,283	100.00%	14

== See also ==
- United States presidential elections in North Carolina
