= 1808 United States presidential election in New Hampshire =

Election

- November 4 – December 7, 1808
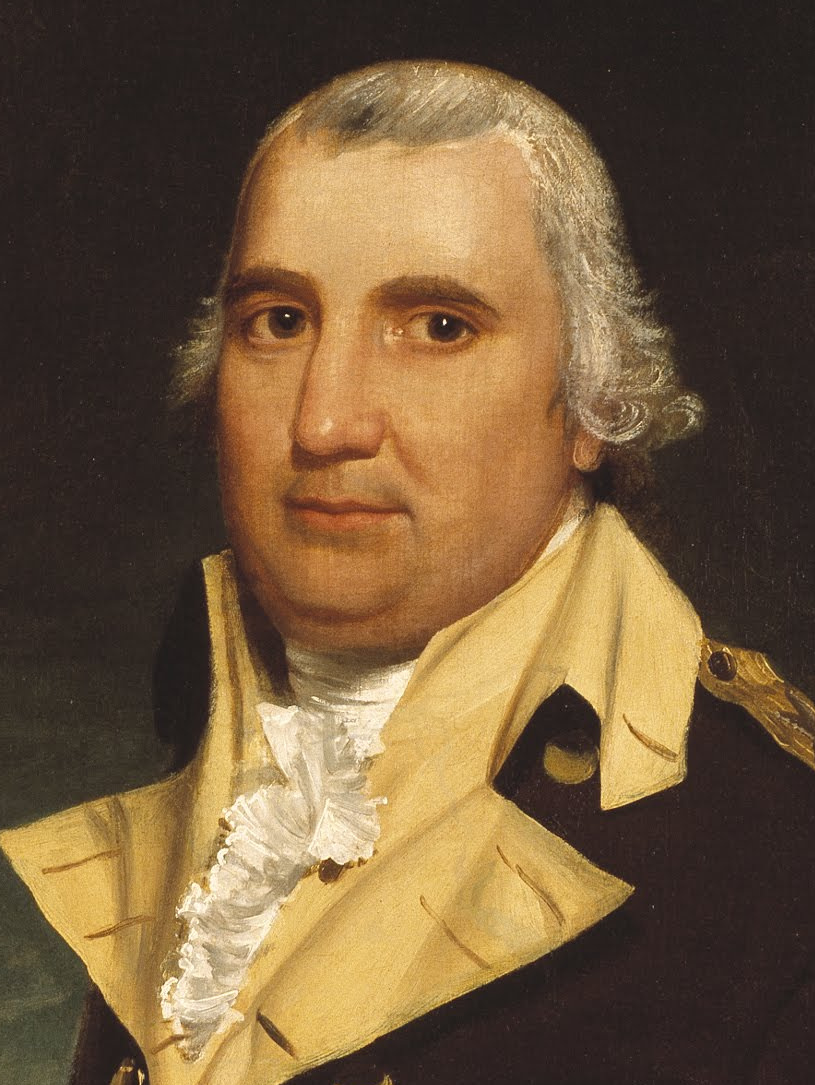

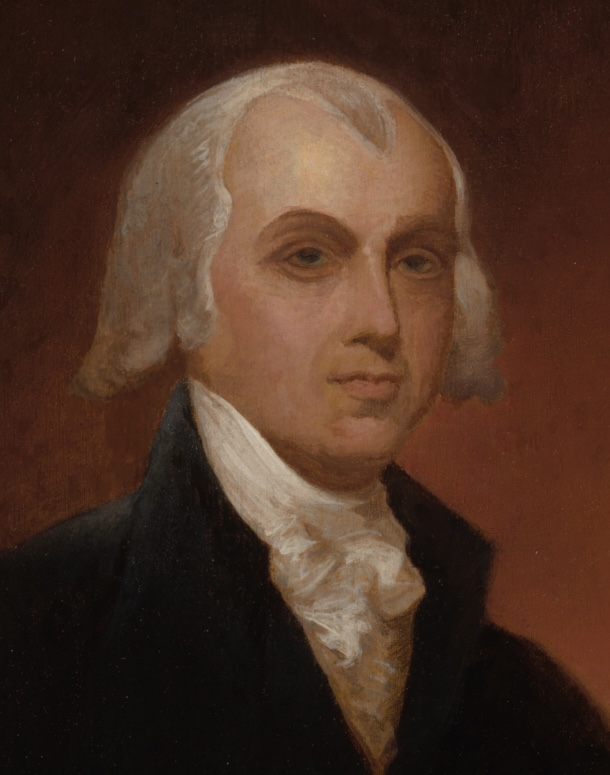
Nominee	Charles Cotesworth Pinckney	James Madison
Party	Federalist	Democratic-Republican
Home state	South Carolina	Virginia
Running mate	Rufus King	George Clinton
Electoral vote	7	0
Popular vote	14,085	12,793
Percentage	52.40%	47.59%
County results
Pinckney
60–70%
Madison
50–60%
President before election
Thomas Jefferson
Democratic-Republican
Elected President
James Madison
Democratic-Republican

The 1808 United States presidential election in New Hampshire took place between November 4 and December 7, 1808, as part of the 1808 United States presidential election. Voters chose five representatives, or electors, to the Electoral College, who voted for president and vice president.

New Hampshire voted for Federalist candidate and Minister to France Charles Cotesworth Pinckney over the Democratic-Republican candidate and Secretary of State James Madison by a margin of 4.8%, although Pinckney won the state's presidential election. However, Pinckney lost to Madison in the national presidential election, making this the second time New Hampshire voted for a losing candidate in its presidential voting history.

== Results ==
1808 United States presidential election in New Hampshire
Party	Candidate	Votes	Percentage	Electoral votes
Federalist	Charles Cotesworth Pinckney	14,085	52.40%	7
Democratic-Republican	James Madison	12,793	47.59%	–
–	Other	4	0.01%	–
Totals		26,882	100.00%	7

== See also ==
- United States presidential elections in New Hampshire
