= 1808 United States presidential election in New Jersey =

- November 4 – December 7, 1808
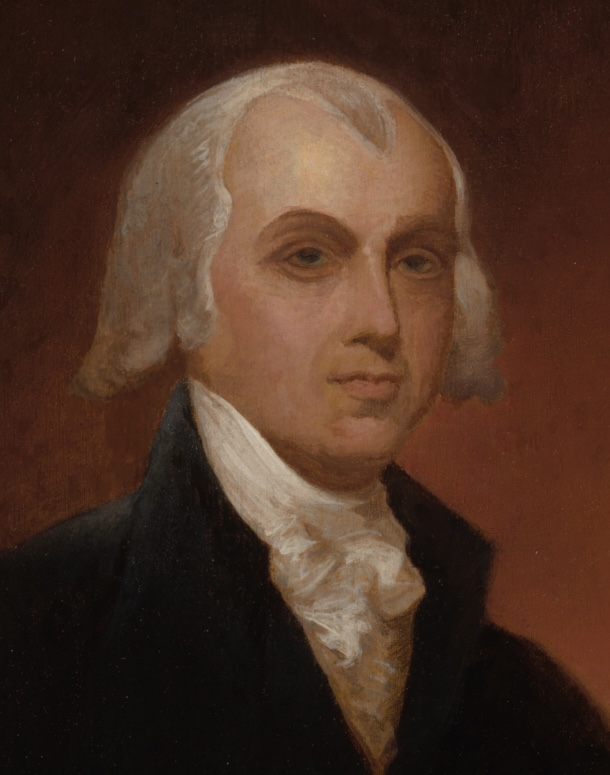

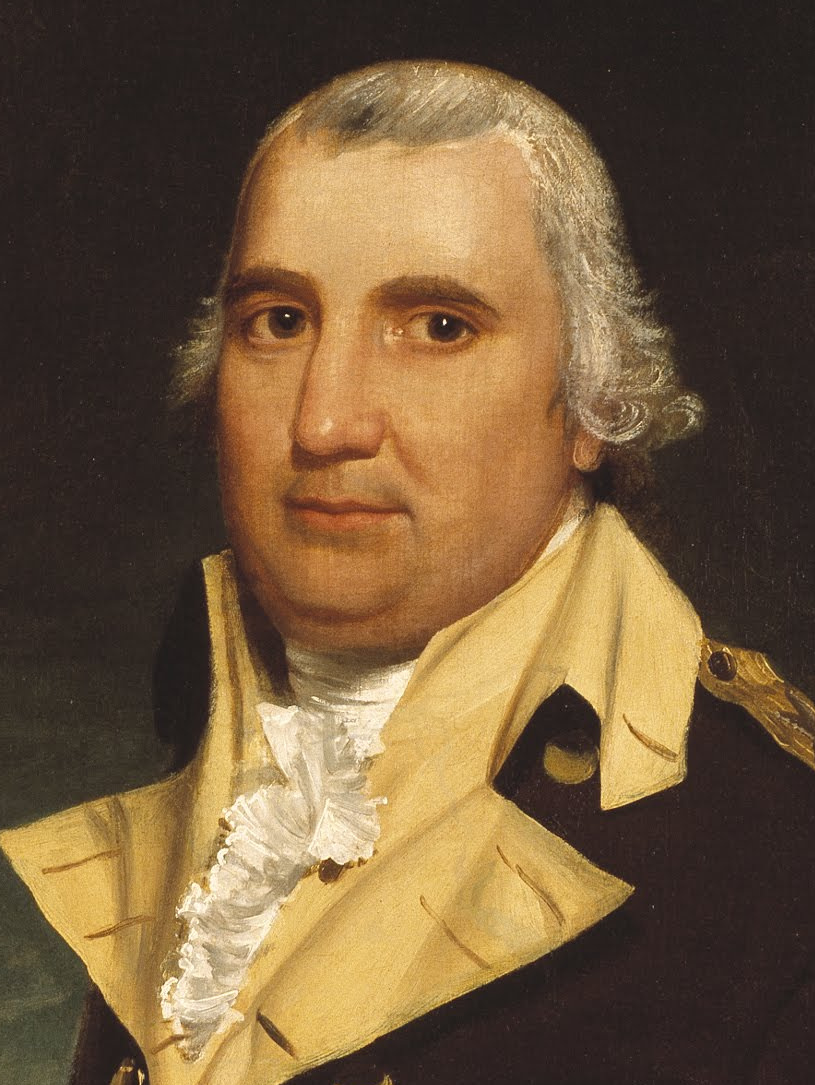
Nominee	James Madison	Charles Cotesworth Pinckney
Party	Democratic-Republican	Federalist
Home state	Virginia	South Carolina
Running mate	George Clinton	Rufus King
Electoral vote	8	0
Popular vote	18,670	14,687
Percentage	55.97%	44.03%
County results
Madison
50–60%
60–70%
80–90%
Pinckney
50–60%
60–70%
70–80%
President before election
Thomas Jefferson
Democratic-Republican
Elected President
James Madison
Democratic-Republican

The 1808 United States presidential election in New Jersey took place between November 4 and December 7, 1808, as part of the 1808 United States presidential election. The state chose eight representatives, or electors to the Electoral College, who voted for President and Vice President.

During this election, New Jersey cast its eight electoral votes to Democratic Republican candidate and Secretary of State James Madison.

== See also ==
- United States presidential elections in New Jersey
