= 1808 United States presidential election in Connecticut =

- November 4 – December 7, 1808
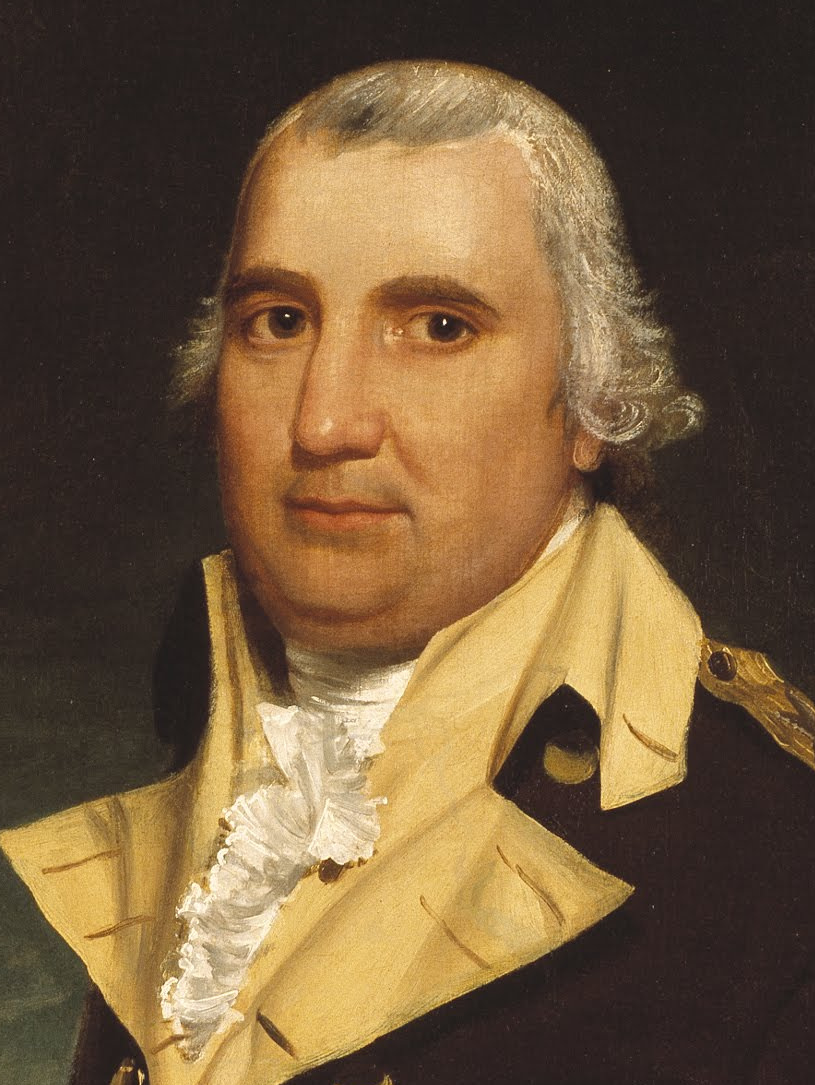
Nominee	Charles Cotesworth Pinckney
Party	Federalist
Home state	South Carolina
Running mate	Rufus King
Electoral vote	9
Percentage	100%
President before election
Thomas Jefferson
Democratic-Republican
Elected President
James Madison
Democratic-Republican

The 1808 United States presidential election in Connecticut took place between November 4 and December 7, 1808, as part of the 1808 United States presidential election. The state legislature chose nine representatives, or electors to the Electoral College, who voted for President and Vice President.

During this election, Connecticut cast its nine electoral votes to Federalist candidate Charles Cotesworth Pinckney. 4 of the 5 New England states voted for Pinckney, barring Vermont, which voted for Democratic Republican candidate and Secretary of State James Madison, who nationally won the election.

== See also ==
- United States presidential elections in Connecticut
