= 1808 United States presidential election in Georgia =

- November 4 – December 7, 1808
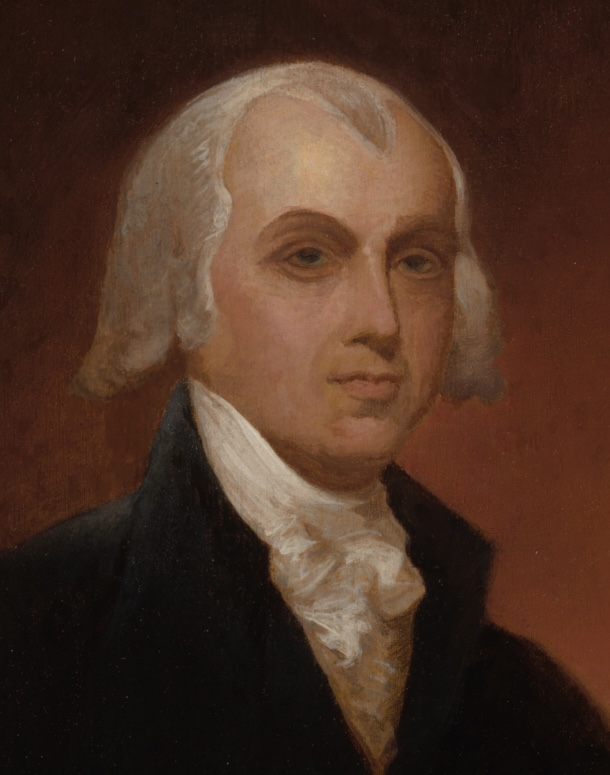

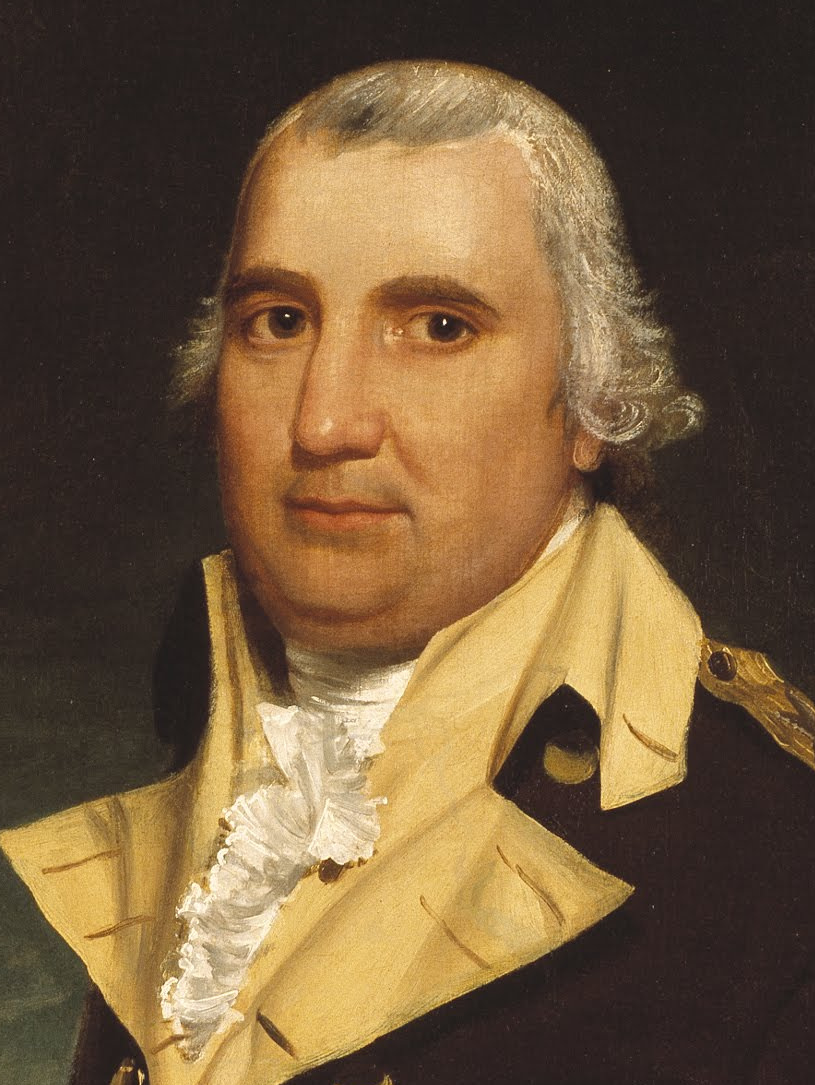
Nominee	James Madison	Charles Cotesworth Pinckney
Party	Democratic-Republican	Federalist
Home state	Virginia	South Carolina
Running mate	George Clinton	Rufus King
Electoral vote	6	0

The 1808 United States presidential election in Georgia took place between November 4 and December 7, 1808, as part of the 1808 United States presidential election. The state legislature chose six representatives, or electors to the Electoral College, who voted for President and Vice President.

Georgia cast six electoral votes for the Democratic-Republican candidate James Madison over the Federalist candidate Charles Cotesworth Pinckney. The electoral votes for Vice president were cast for Madison's running mate George Clinton from New York. These electors were elected by the Georgia General Assembly, the state legislature, rather than by popular vote.

== Results ==
1808 United States presidential election in Georgia
Party	Candidate	Votes	Percentage	Electoral votes
Democratic-Republican	James Madison	–	–	6
Federalist	Charles Cotesworth Pinckney	–	–	0
Totals		–	–	6

== See also ==
- United States presidential elections in Georgia
