= 1808 United States presidential election in Pennsylvania =

- November 4 – December 7, 1808
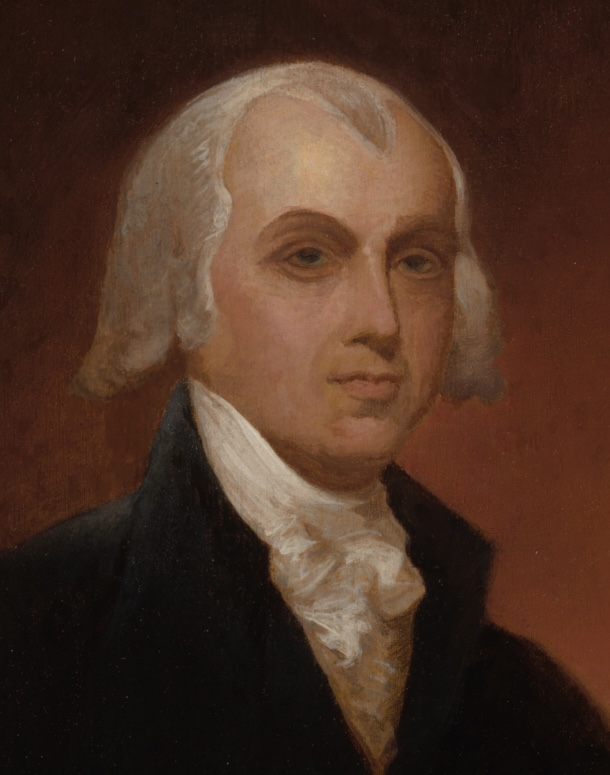

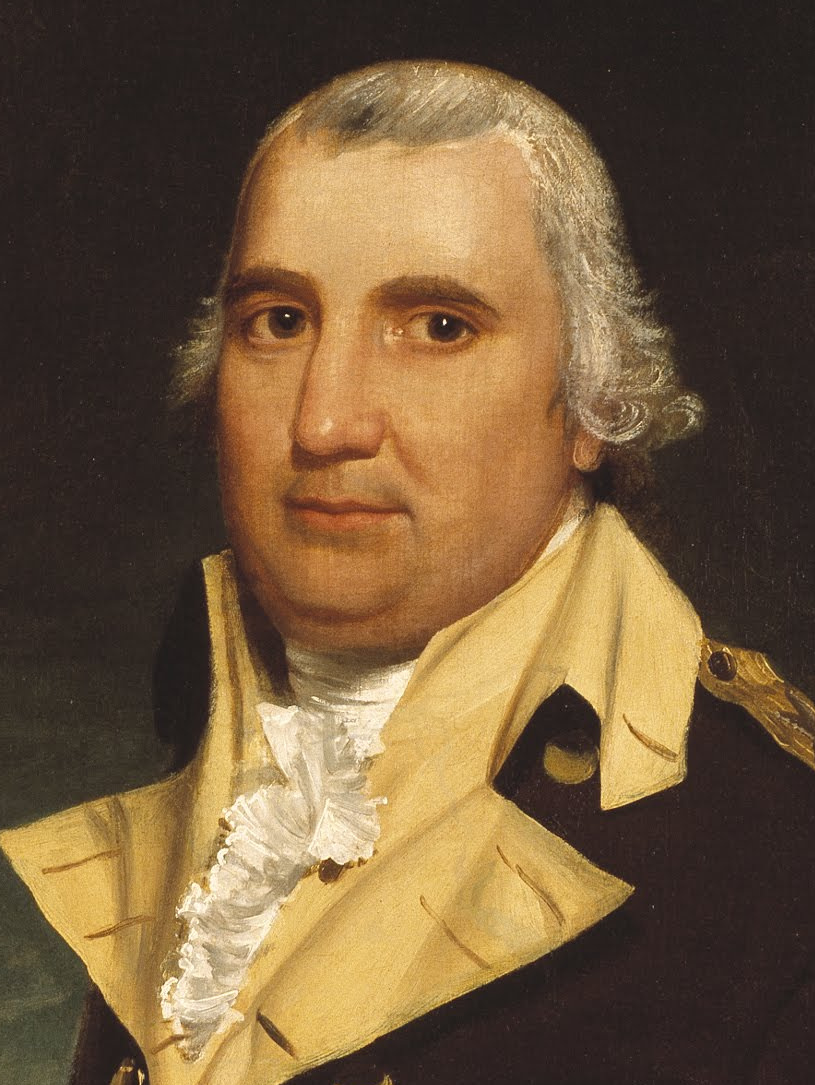
Nominee	James Madison	Charles Cotesworth Pinckney
Party	Democratic-Republican	Federalist
Home state	Virginia	South Carolina
Running mate	George Clinton	Rufus King
Electoral vote	20	0
Popular vote	42,508	11,735
Percentage	78.37%	21.63%
County results
Madison
50–60%
60–70%
70–80%
80–90%
90–100%
Pinckney
50–60%
President before election
Thomas Jefferson
Democratic-Republican
Elected President
James Madison
Democratic-Republican

A presidential election was held in Pennsylvania in 1808, as part of the 1808 United States presidential election. Voters chose 20 representatives, or electors to the Electoral College, who voted for President and Vice President.

Pennsylvania voted for the Democratic-Republican candidate, James Madison, over the Federalist candidate, Charles Cotesworth Pinckney. Madison won Pennsylvania by a margin of 56.74%.

== Results ==
1808 United States presidential election in Pennsylvania
Party	Candidate	Votes	Percentage	Electoral votes
Democratic-Republican	James Madison	42,508	78.37%	20
Federalist	Charles Cotesworth Pinckney	11,735	21.63%	0
Totals		54,243	100.0%	20

=== County results ===
County	James Madison Democratic-Republican		Charles Cotesworth Pinckney Federalist		Total votes cast
County	%	#	%	#	Total votes cast
Adams	53.08%	414	46.92%	366	780
Allegheny	75.48%	982	24.52%	319	1,301
Armstrong	100.00%	178	0.00%	0	178
Beaver	100.00%	243	0.00%	0	243
Bedford	71.14%	668	28.86%	271	939
Berks	93.04%	3,206	6.96%	240	3,446
Bucks	60.01%	1,660	39.99%	1,106	2,766
Butler	85.22%	294	14.78%	51	345
Cambria	89.86%	62	10.14%	7	69
Centre & Clearfield	95.55%	858	4.45%	40	898
Chester	66.57%	2,545	33.43%	1,278	3,823
Crawford	64.51%	269	35.49%	148	417
Cumberland	79.25%	1,772	20.75%	464	2,236
Dauphin	90.14%	2,120	9.86%	232	2,352
Delaware	45.12%	703	54.88%	855	1,558
Erie	69.93%	200	30.07%	86	286
Fayette	88.76%	892	11.24%	113	1,005
Franklin	81.46%	1,419	18.54%	323	1,742
Greene	98.06%	353	1.94%	7	360
Huntingdon	63.39%	355	36.61%	205	560
Indiana & Jefferson	94.29%	132	5.71%	8	140
Lancaster	98.88%	2,560	1.12%	29	2,589
Luzerne	52.84%	456	47.16%	407	863
Lycoming	74.29%	598	25.71%	207	805
Mercer	100.00%	288	0.00%	0	288
Mifflin	96.34%	789	3.66%	30	819
Montgomery	78.61%	2,444	21.39%	665	3,109
Northampton	79.67%	2,273	20.33%	580	2,853
Northumberland	93.63%	2,688	6.37%	183	2,871
Philadelphia (County)	75.10%	3,407	23.90%	1,070	4,477
Philadelphia (City)	60.02%	2,831	39.98%	1,886	4,717
Somerset	88.07%	384	11.93%	52	436
Venango & Warren	83.02%	88	16.98%	18	106
Washington	91.95%	1,794	8.05%	157	1,951
Wayne	88.56%	178	11.44%	23	201
Westmoreland	80.73%	595	19.27%	142	737
York	91.55%	1,810	8.45%	167	1,977
^{Source:}

== See also ==
- United States presidential elections in Pennsylvania
