= 1808 United States presidential election in Rhode Island =

- November 4 – December 7, 1808
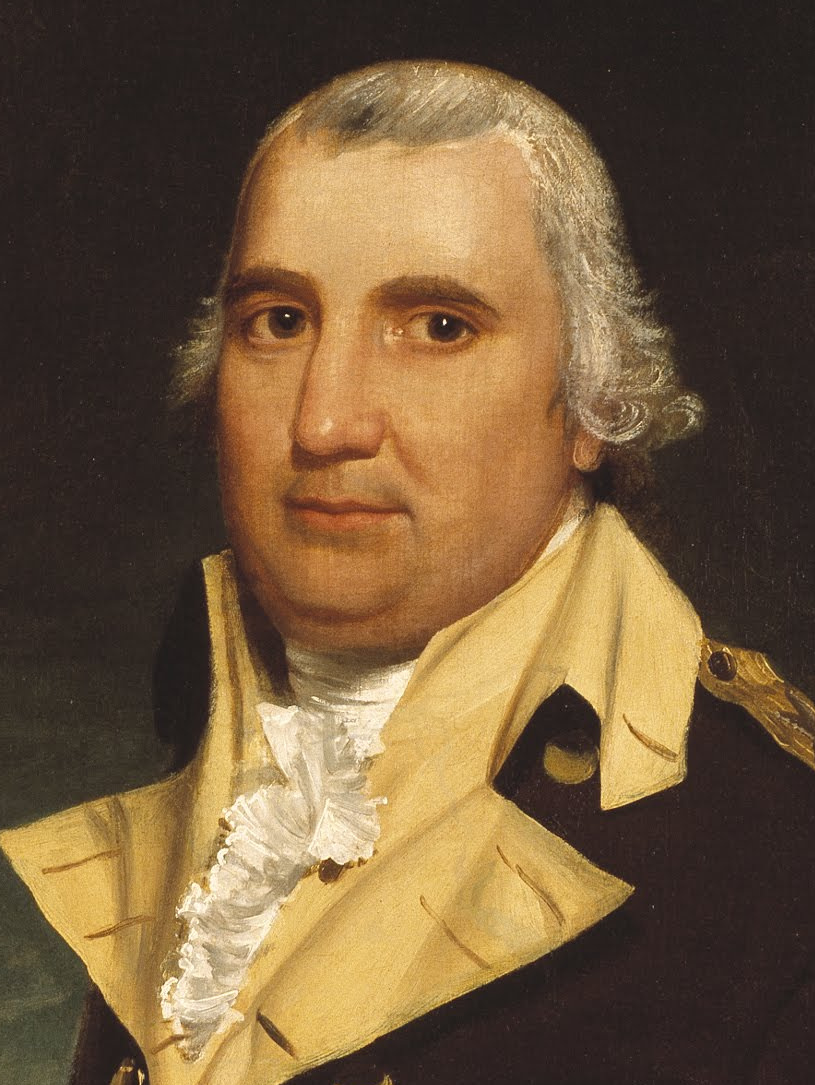

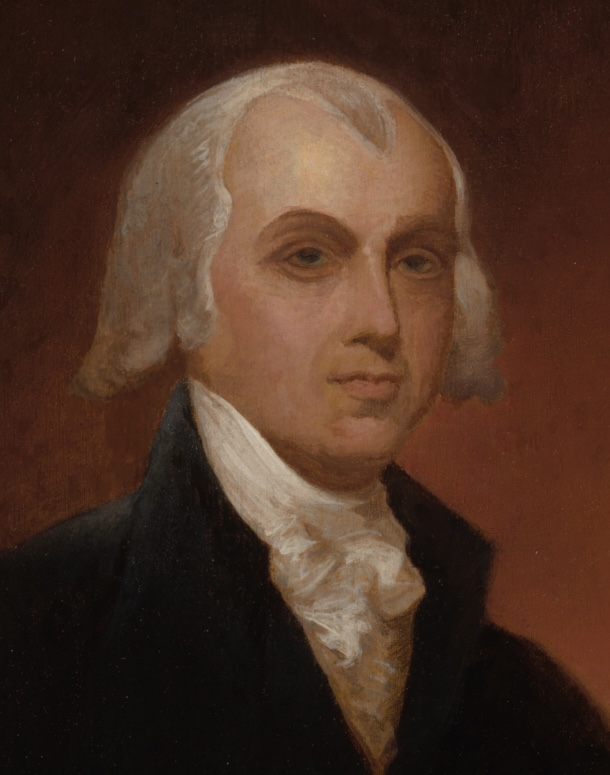
Nominee	Charles Cotesworth Pinckney	James Madison
Party	Federalist	Democratic-Republican
Home state	South Carolina	Virginia
Running mate	Rufus King	George Clinton
Electoral vote	4	0
Popular vote	3,072	2,692
Percentage	53.30%	46.70%

Madison
50-60%
60-70%
70-80%
80-90%
Pinckney
50-60%
60-70%
70-80%
80-90%
Tie
50%
President before election
Thomas Jefferson
Democratic-Republican
Elected President
James Madison
Democratic-Republican

The 1808 United States presidential election in Rhode Island took place as part of the 1808 United States presidential election. Voters chose 4 representatives, or electors to the Electoral College who voted for president and vice president.

Rhode Island voted for the Federalist candidate, Charles Cotesworth Pinckney, over the Democratic-Republican candidate, James Madison. Pinckney won Rhode Island by a margin of 6.6%.

== Results ==
1808 United States presidential election in Rhode Island
Party	Candidate	Votes	Percentage	Electoral votes
Federalist	Charles Cotesworth Pinckney	3,072	53.30%	4
Democratic-Republican	James Madison	2,692	46.70%	–
Totals		5,764	100.00%	4

== See also ==
- United States presidential elections in Rhode Island
