= 1808 United States presidential election =

Election of James Madison

- November 4 – December 7, 1808

176 members of the Electoral College 89 electoral votes needed to win
- Turnout: 36.8% (▲13.0 pp)
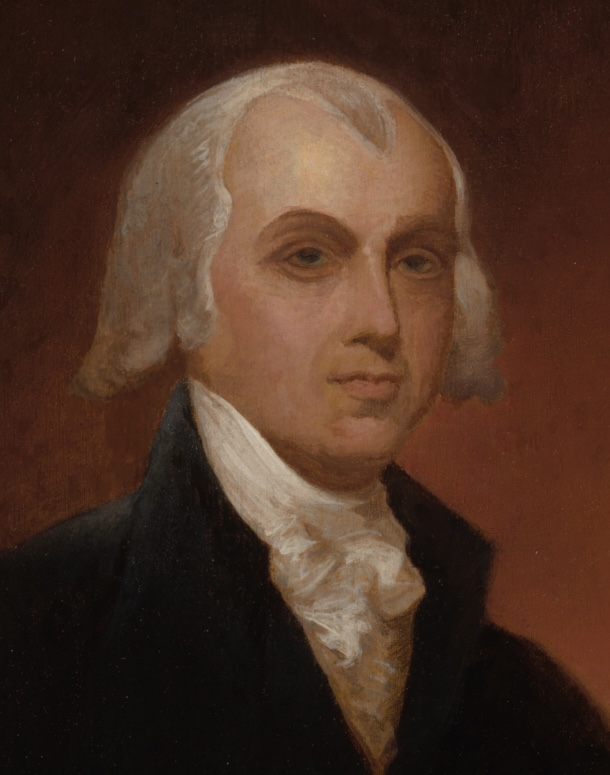

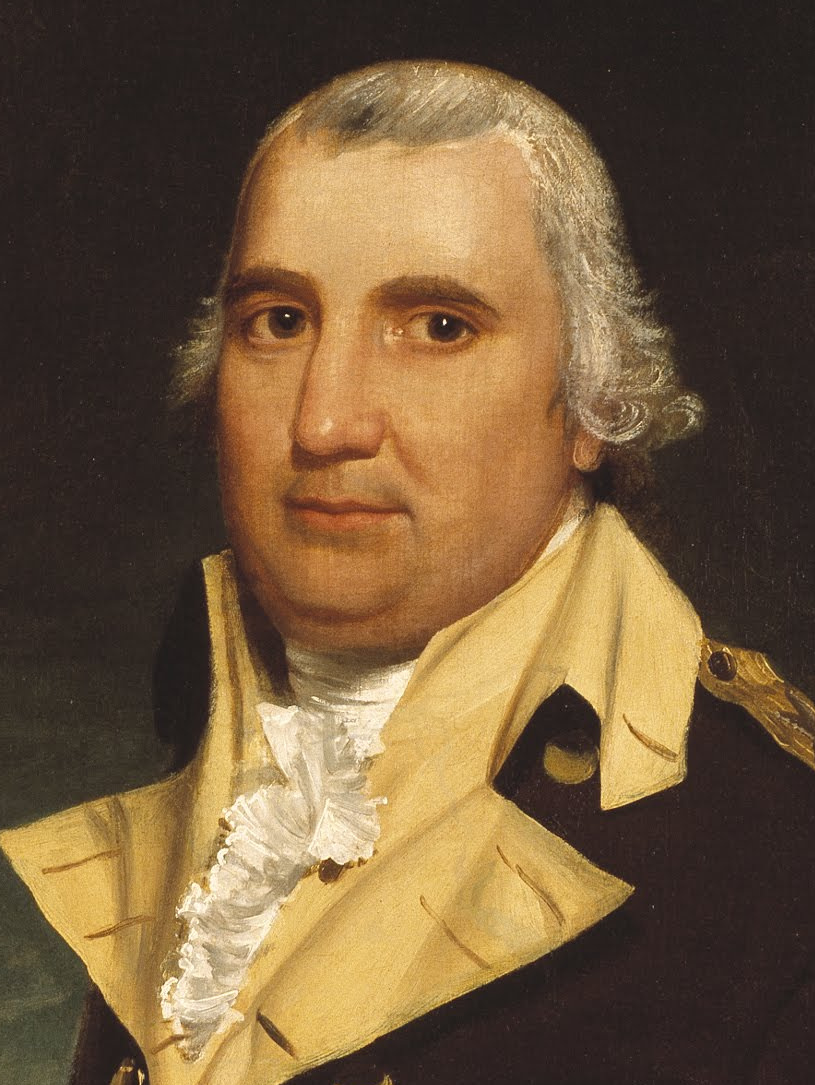
Nominee	James Madison	Charles Cotesworth Pinckney
Party	Democratic-Republican	Federalist
Home state	Virginia	South Carolina
Running mate	George Clinton	Rufus King
Electoral vote	122	47
States carried	12	5
Popular vote	124,964	60,976
Percentage	65.0%	31.7%
- Presidential election results map. Green denotes states won by Madison/Clinton, Salmon denotes states won by Pinckney/King. In addition, Light Green denotes the electoral votes won by Clinton in the state of New York. Numbers indicate the number of electoral votes cast by each state.
President before election
Thomas Jefferson
Democratic-Republican
Elected President
James Madison
Democratic-Republican

A presidential election was held in the United States from November 4 to December 7, 1808. The Democratic-Republican candidate James Madison defeated Federalist candidate Charles Cotesworth Pinckney decisively.

Madison had served as Secretary of State since President Thomas Jefferson took office in 1801. Jefferson, who had declined to run for a third term, threw his strong support behind Madison, a fellow Virginian. Sitting Vice President George Clinton and former Ambassador James Monroe both challenged Madison for leadership of the party, but Madison won his party's nomination and Clinton was renominated as vice president. The Federalists chose to re-nominate Pinckney, a former ambassador who had served as the party's 1804 nominee, again alongside Rufus King.

Despite the unpopularity of the Embargo Act of 1807, Madison won the vast majority of electoral votes outside of the Federalist stronghold of New England. Clinton received six electoral votes for president from his home state of New York. This election was the first of two instances in American history in which a new president was selected but the incumbent vice president won re-election, the other being in 1828.

== Nominations ==
=== Democratic-Republican Party nomination ===
Democratic-Republican Party 1808 Democratic-Republican Party Ticket
James Madison	George Clinton
for President	for Vice President
5th U.S. Secretary of State (1801–1809)	4th Vice President of the United States (1805–1812)

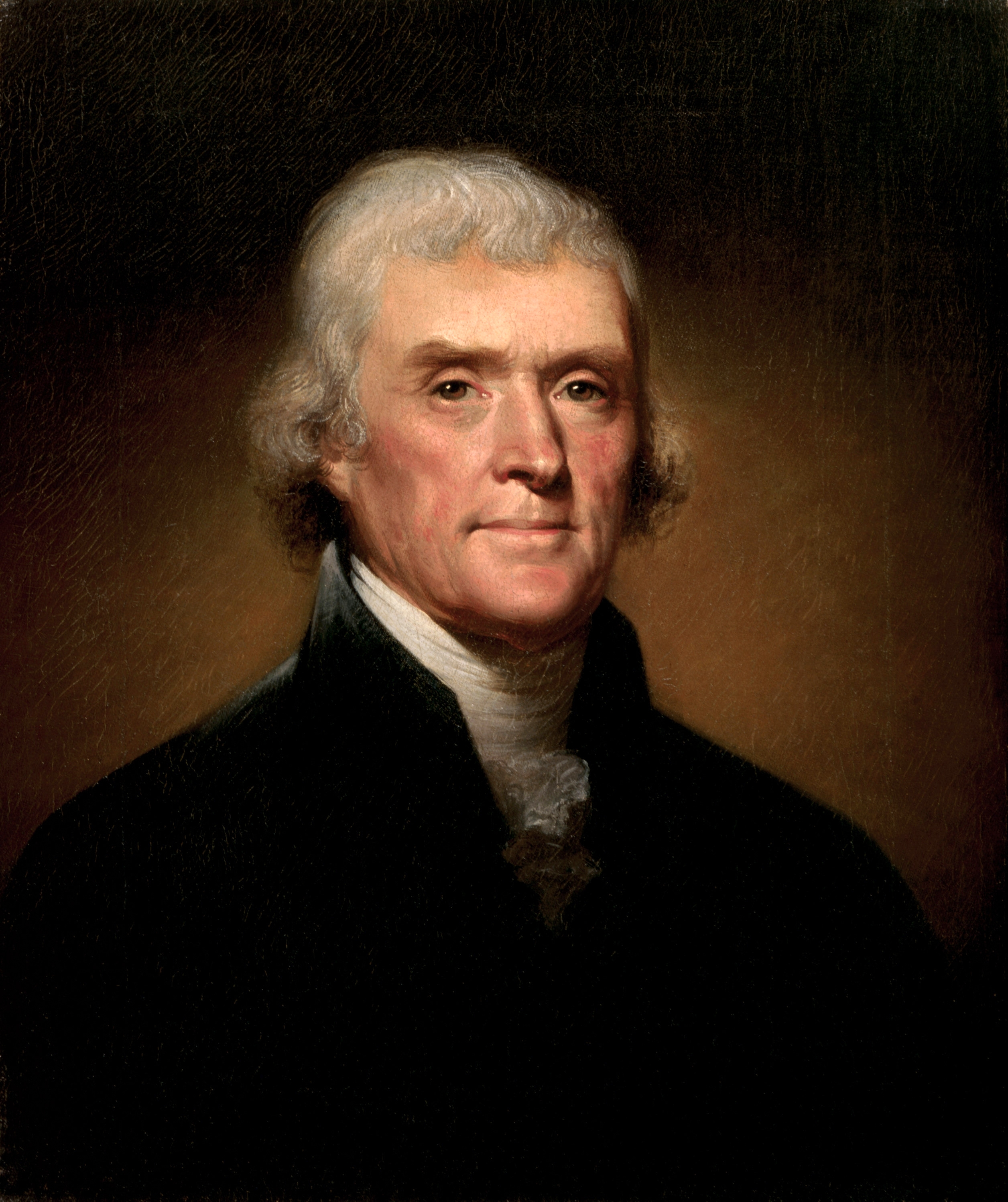
Thomas Jefferson, the incumbent president in 1808, whose second term expired on March 4, 1809

==== Presidential candidates ====
- James Madison (Virginia), Secretary of State
- James Monroe (Virginia), Former U.S. Ambassador to Great Britain
- George Clinton (New York), Vice President of the United States
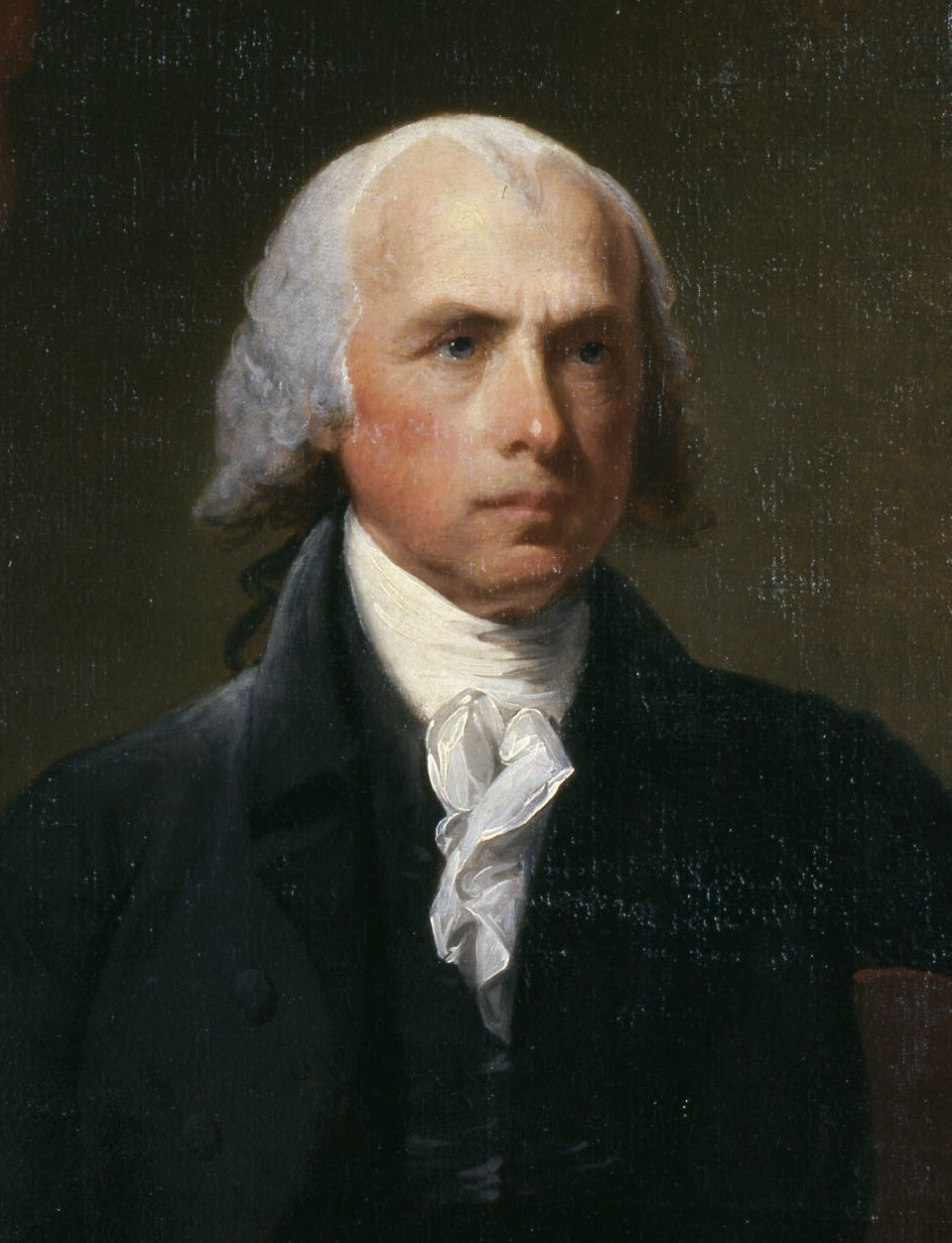
Secretary of State
James Madison
from Virginia

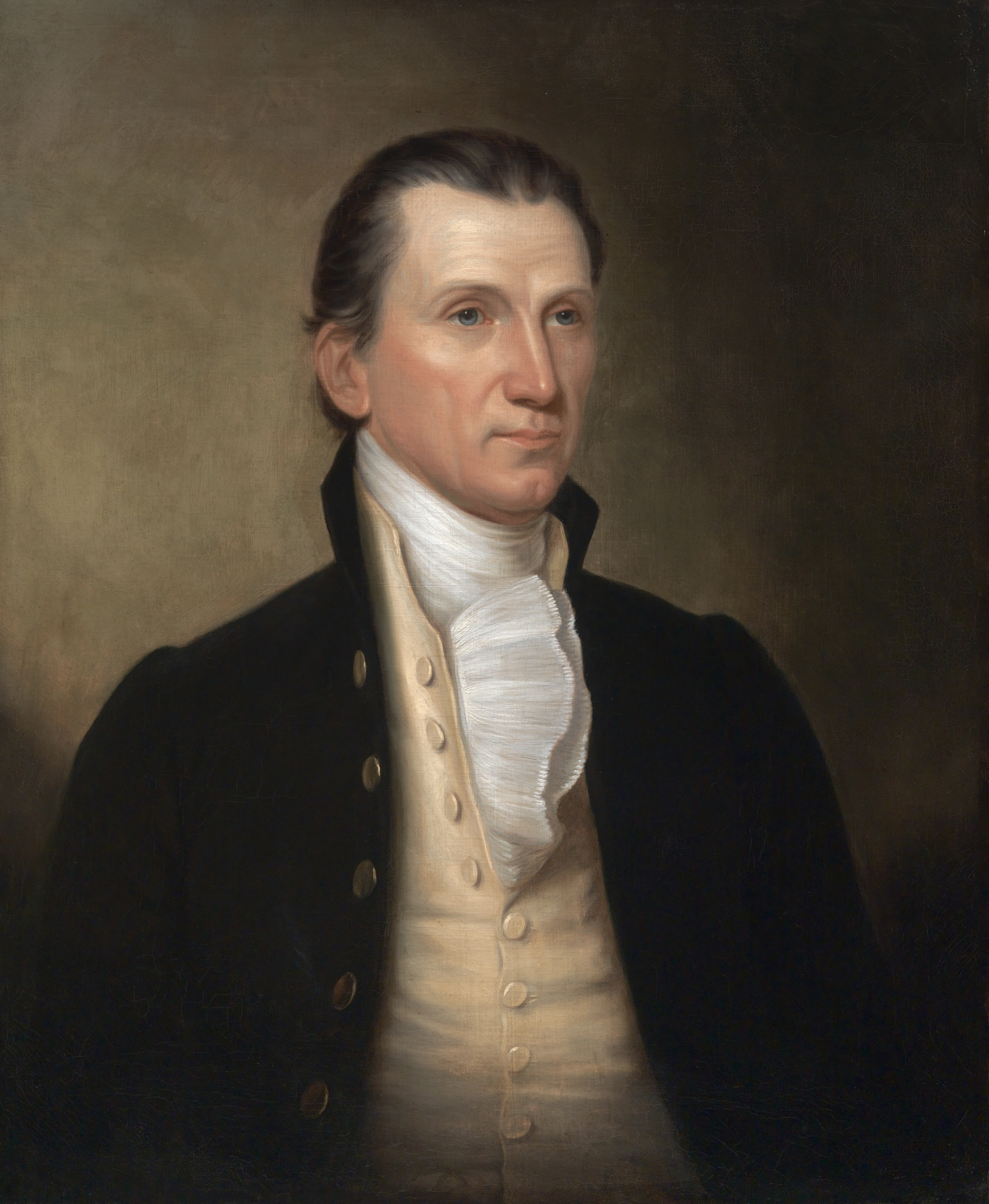
Former U.S. Ambassador
James Monroe
from Virginia

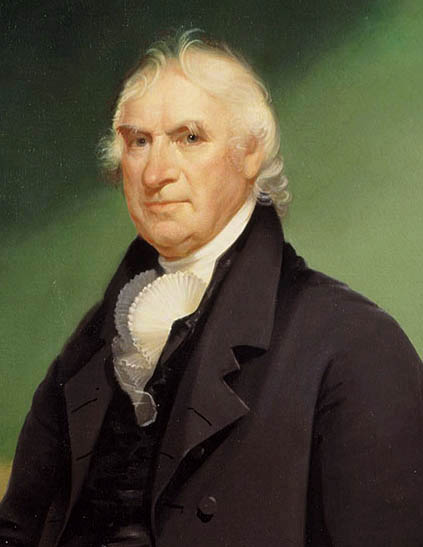
Vice President
George Clinton
from New York

==== Vice-presidential candidates ====
- George Clinton (New York), Vice President of the United States
- John Langdon (New Hampshire), Governor
- Henry Dearborn (Massachusetts), Secretary of War
- John Quincy Adams (Massachusetts), United States Senator
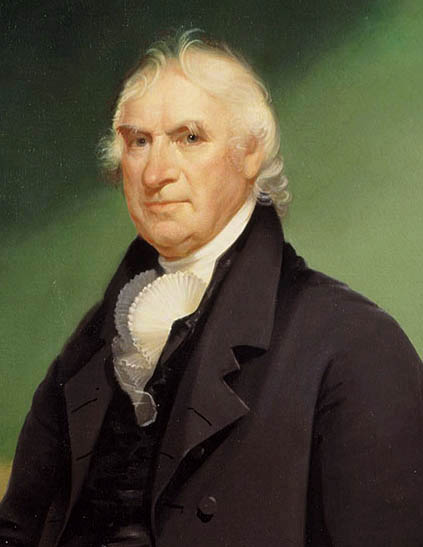
Vice President
George Clinton
from New York

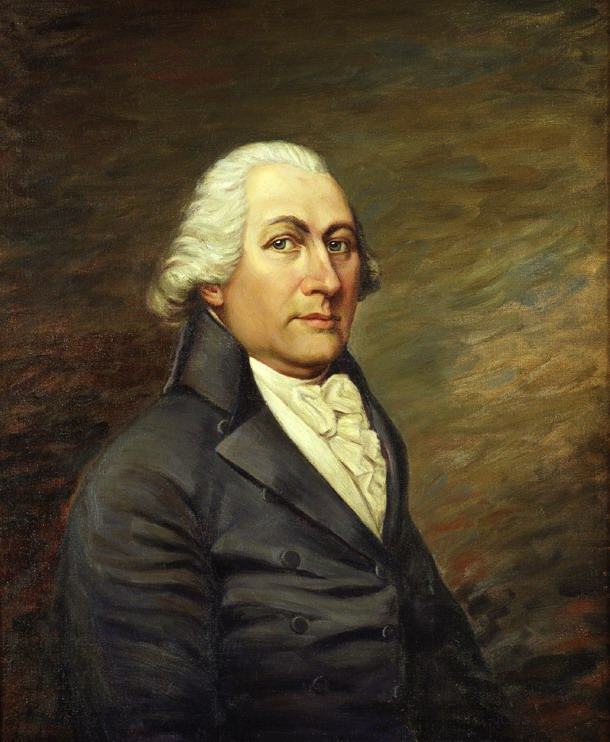
Governor
John Langdon
from New Hampshire

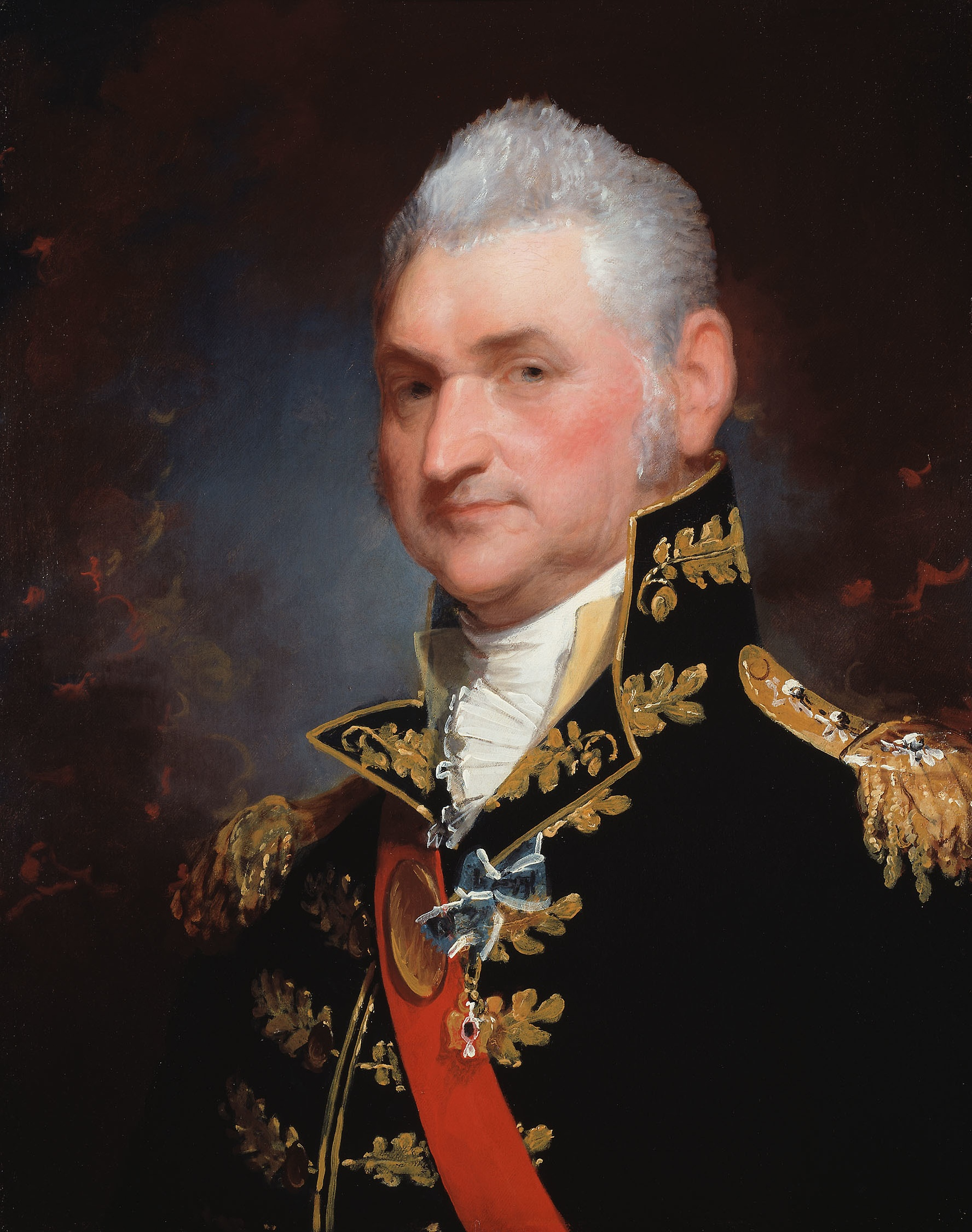
Secretary of War
Henry Dearborn
from Massachusetts

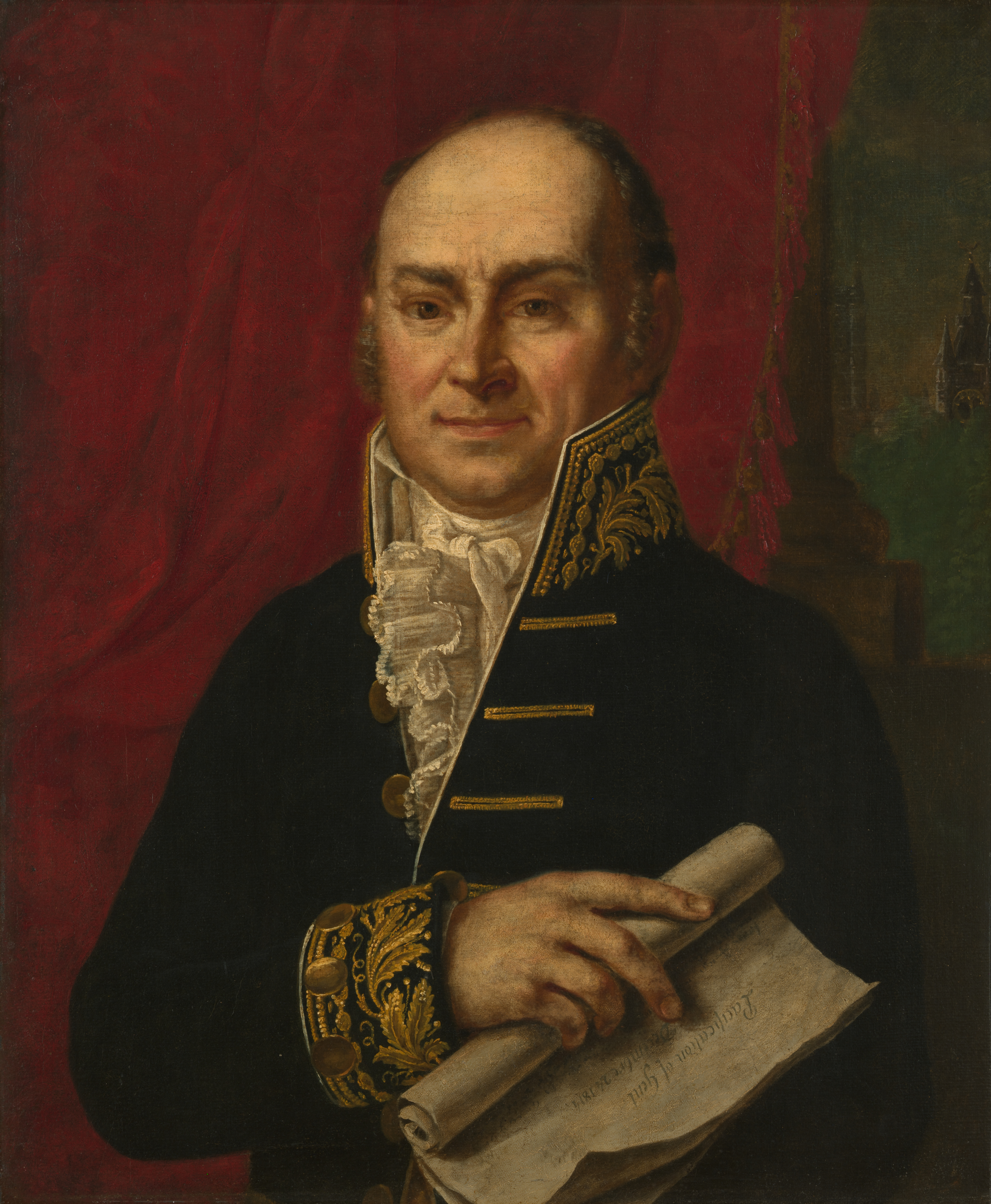
Senator
John Quincy Adams
from Massachusetts

==== Caucus ====
Senator Stephen R. Bradley, who had chaired the congressional nominating caucus during the 1804 presidential election, made a call for the 1808 caucus to the 146 Democratic-Republican members of the United States Congress and Federalist allies. The caucus was attended by 89 to 94 members of Congress.

The caucus was held in January 1808. With the support of outgoing President Thomas Jefferson, Secretary of State James Madison won the presidential nomination over opposing candidates James Monroe and Vice President George Clinton. The caucus voted to give the vice presidential nomination to Clinton over his main opponent John Langdon, although Clinton's supporters believed Clinton would receive the Federalist Party's presidential nomination. The Federalists instead nominated Charles Cotesworth Pinckney that September. A committee of fifteen members was selected to manage Madison's campaign.

Seventeen Democratic-Republicans in Congress opposed Madison's selection and the caucus system whose authority to select presidential and vice-presidential candidates was disputed. Clinton also opposed the caucus system. Monroe, who was supported by dissident and majority leader John Randolph, was nominated by a group of Virginia Democratic-Republicans (Old Republicans), and although he did not actively try to defeat Madison, he also refused to withdraw from the race. Clinton was also supported by a group of New York Democratic-Republicans for president even as he remained the party's official vice presidential candidate.

==== Balloting ====
Presidential Ballot	Total	Vice Presidential Ballot	Total
James Madison	83	George Clinton	79
James Monroe	3	John Langdon	5
George Clinton	3	Henry Dearborn	3
		John Quincy Adams	1

=== Federalist Party nomination ===
Federalist Party 1808 Federalist Party Ticket
Charles Cotesworth Pinckney	Rufus King
for President	for Vice President
6th U.S. Minister to France (1796–1797)	3rd U.S. Minister to Great Britain (1796–1803)

The Federalist caucus met in September 1808 and re-nominated the party's 1804 ticket, which consisted of General Charles Cotesworth Pinckney of South Carolina and former Senator Rufus King of New York. This was the only time in American history that a defeated major party renominated its losing ticket for a second time.

== General election ==
=== Campaign ===
The election was marked by opposition to Jefferson's Embargo Act of 1807, a halt to trade with Europe that disproportionately hurt New England merchants and was perceived as favoring France over Britain. Nonetheless, Jefferson was still very popular with Americans generally and Pinckney was soundly defeated by Madison, though not as badly as in 1804. Pinckney received few electoral votes outside of New England.

=== Results ===
Pinckney retained the electoral votes of the two states that he carried in 1804 (Connecticut and Delaware), and he also picked up New Hampshire, Massachusetts, Rhode Island, and three electoral districts in North Carolina besides the two electoral districts in Maryland that he carried earlier. Except for the North Carolina districts, all of the improvement was in New England.

Monroe won a portion of the popular vote in Virginia and North Carolina, while the New York legislature split its electoral votes between Madison and Clinton.

Electoral results
Presidential candidate	Party	Home state	Popular vote^{(a), (b)}		Electoral vote^{(c)}	Running mate		
Presidential candidate	Party	Home state	Count	Percentage	Electoral vote^{(c)}	Vice-presidential candidate	Home state	Electoral vote^{(c)}
James Madison	Democratic-Republican	Virginia	124,964	64.97%	122	George Clinton (incumbent)	New York	113
James Madison	Democratic-Republican	Virginia	124,964	64.97%	122	John Langdon	New Hampshire	9
Charles Cotesworth Pinckney	Federalist	South Carolina	60,976	31.70%	47	Rufus King	New York	47
George Clinton	Democratic-Republican	New York	—	—	6	James Madison	Virginia	3
George Clinton	Democratic-Republican	New York	—	—	6	James Monroe	Virginia	3
James Monroe	Democratic-Republican	Virginia	5,618	2.92%	0	None	N/A	0
Unpledged electors	None	N/A	776	0.40%	0	N/A	N/A	0
Total			192,334	100%	175			175
Needed to win					89			89

Source (Popular Vote): A New Nation Votes: American Election Returns 1787-1825
Source (Electoral Vote): "Electoral College Box Scores 1789–1996". National Archives and Records Administration.

^{(a)} Only 10 of the 17 states chose electors by popular vote.
^{(b)} Those states that did choose electors by popular vote had widely varying restrictions on suffrage via property requirements.
^{(c)} One Elector from Kentucky did not vote.

=== Electoral votes by state ===
State	Electoral votes	For President				For Vice President					
State	Electoral votes	JMa	GC	CCP	B	GC	JMa	JMo	JL	RK	B
Connecticut	9	—	—	9	—	—	—	—	—	9	—
Delaware	3	—	—	3	—	—	—	—	—	3	—
Georgia	6	6	—	—	—	6	—	—	—	—	—
Kentucky	8	7	—	—	1	7	—	—	—	—	1
Maryland	11	9	—	2	—	9	—	—	—	2	—
Massachusetts	19	—	—	19	—	—	—	—	—	19	—
New Hampshire	7	—	—	7	—	—	—	—	—	7	—
New Jersey	8	8	—	—	—	8	—	—	—	—	—
New York	19	13	6	—	—	13	3	3	—	—	—
North Carolina	14	11	—	3	—	11	—	—	—	3	—
Ohio	3	3	—	—	—	—	—	—	3	—	—
Pennsylvania	20	20	—	—	—	20	—	—	—	—	—
Rhode Island	4	—	—	4	—	—	—	—	—	4	—
South Carolina	10	10	—	—	—	10	—	—	—	—	—
Tennessee	5	5	—	—	—	5	—	—	—	—	—
Vermont	6	6	—	—	—	—	—	—	6	—	—
Virginia	24	24	—	—	—	24	—	—	—	—	—
TOTAL	175	122	6	47	1	113	3	3	9	47	1
TO WIN	89					89					

=== Maps ===
Electoral College map (president)

Electoral College map (vice president)

Map of presidential election results by county, shaded according to the vote share of the highest result for an elector of any given candidate

Map of presidential election results by electoral district, shaded according to the vote share of the highest result for an elector of any given candidate. Electoral boundaries for Maryland could not be found

== Popular vote by state ==
The popular vote totals used are the elector from each party with the highest total of votes. The vote totals of Kentucky, North Carolina, and Tennessee appear to be incomplete.

State	James Madison Democratic-Republican		Charles Cotesworth Pinckney Federalist		James Monroe Democratic-Republican		Other		Margin		Ref
	#	%	#	%	#	%	#	%	#	%	
Kentucky	2,679+	76.89%	54	1.55%	No ballots		751	21.56%	1,874	53.78%	
Maryland	15,336	67.30%	7,433	32.62%	No ballots		18	0.08%	7,885	34.60%	
New Hampshire	12,793	47.59%	14,085	52.40%	No ballots		4	0.01%	-1,288	-4.8%	
New Jersey	18,670	55.97%	14,687	44.03%	No ballots		3	0.01%	3,980	11.93%	
North Carolina	9,932+	52.70%	7,975+	42.32%	939+	4.98%	No ballots		1,018	5.40%	
Ohio	3,331	67.76%	1,174	23.88%	411	8.36%	No ballots		2,157	43.88%	
Pennsylvania	42,518	78.37%	11,735	21.63%	No ballots		No ballots		30,783	56.74%	
Rhode Island	2,692	46.70%	3,072	53.30%	No ballots		No ballots		-380	-6.60%	
Tennessee	1,016	? (Note: All non-Madison electors were reported under an "others" section.)	?	?	?	?	?	?	?	?	
Virginia	15,683	78.62%	761	3.81%	3,505	17.57%	No ballots		12,178	61.05%	

=== States that flipped from Democratic-Republican to Federalist ===
- Massachusetts
- New Hampshire
- Rhode Island

=== Close states ===
States where the margin of victory was under 5%:

1. New Hampshire, 4.8% (1,288 votes)

States where the margin of victory was under 10%:

1. Rhode Island, 6.6% (380 votes)
2. North Carolina, 5.40% (1,018 votes)

Popular vote
Madison	65.0%
Pinckney	31.7%
Monroe	2.9%
Unpledged electors	0.4%

Electoral vote (presidential)
Madison	69.7%
Pinckney	26.9%
Clinton	3.4%

Electoral vote (vice presidential)
Clinton	64.6%
King	26.9%
Langdon	5.1%
Madison	1.7%
Monroe	1.7%

== Electoral college selection ==
Method of choosing electors	State(s)
Each Elector appointed by state legislature	Connecticut; Delaware; Georgia; Massachusetts; New York; South Carolina; Vermont
Each Elector chosen by voters statewide	New Hampshire; New Jersey; Ohio; Pennsylvania; Rhode Island; Virginia
State is divided into two electoral districts and half the electors are chosen from each district.	Kentucky
State is divided into electoral districts, with one Elector chosen per district by the voters of that district	Maryland; North Carolina; Tennessee

== See also ==
- History of the United States (1789–1849)
- First inauguration of James Madison
- 1808–09 United States House of Representatives elections
- 1808–09 United States Senate elections
