= Charles Cotesworth Pinckney =

American Founding Father and politician (1746–1825)

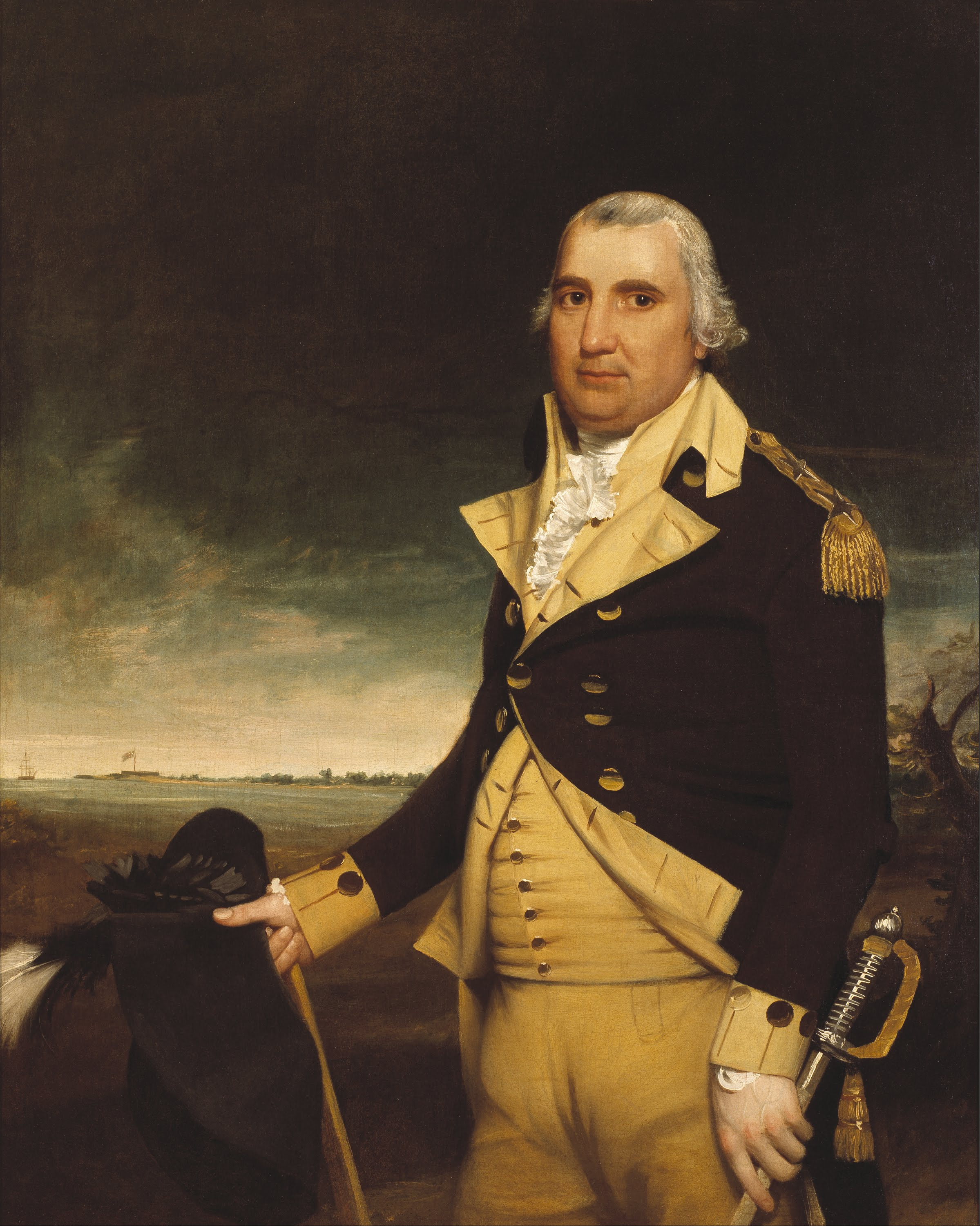
- Portrait by James Earl, c. 1795

6th United States Minister to France
- In office September 9, 1796 – February 5, 1797
- Nominated by: George Washington
- Preceded by: James Monroe
- Succeeded by: Robert R. Livingston

Personal details
- Born: February 25, 1746 [O.S. February 14, 1746] Charles Town, Province of South Carolina, British America
- Died: August 16, 1825 (aged 79) Charleston, South Carolina, U.S.
- Party: Federalist
- Spouse(s): Sarah Middleton (m. 1773; died 1784) Mary Stead (m. 1786)
- Children: 3
- Parent(s): Charles Pinckney; Eliza Lucas
- Education: Westminster School; Christ Church, Oxford; Middle Temple
- Other political post(s): Member of the Constitutional Convention; Member of the South Carolina Senate; Member of the South Carolina House of Representatives; Member of the South Carolina Commons House of Assembly

Military service
- Allegiance: South Carolina; United States
- Branch/service: South Carolina Militia; Continental Army; United States Army
- Years of service: 1769–1783; 1798–1800
- Rank: Major general
- Commands: First South Carolina Regiment; U.S. Army Southern Department
- Battles/wars: American Revolutionary War; Battle of Sullivan's Island; Battle of Brandywine; Battle of Germantown; Siege of Savannah; Siege of Charleston (POW)

Charles Cotesworth Pinckney (February 25 [O.S. February 14, 1746] – August 16, 1825) was an American statesman, military officer and Founding Father who served as United States Minister to France from 1796 to 1797. A delegate to the Constitutional Convention where he signed the Constitution of the United States, Pinckney was twice nominated by the Federalist Party as its presidential candidate in 1804 and 1808, losing both elections.

Born into a planter class family from South Carolina, Pinckney practiced law for several years and was elected to the colonial legislature. A supporter of independence from Great Britain, Pinckney served in the American Revolutionary War, rising to the rank of brigadier general. After the war, he won election to the South Carolina legislature, where he and his brother Thomas represented the landed slavocracy of the South Carolina Lowcountry. An advocate of a stronger federal government, Pinckney served as a delegate to the 1787 Philadelphia Convention, which wrote a new federal constitution. Pinckney's influence helped ensure that South Carolina would ratify the United States Constitution. A town and district named Pinckneyville in South Carolina were named after Charles in 1791.

Pinckney declined George Washington's first offer to serve in his administration, but in 1796 Pinckney accepted the position of minister to France. In what became known as the XYZ Affair, the French demanded a bribe before they would agree to meet with the U.S. delegation. Pinckney returned to the United States, accepting an appointment as a general during the Quasi-War with France. Though he had resisted joining either major party for much of the 1790s, Pinckney began to identify with the Federalist Party following his return from France. The Federalists chose him as their vice presidential nominee in the 1800 presidential election, hoping that his presence on the ticket could win support for the party in the American South. Though Alexander Hamilton schemed to elect Pinckney president under the electoral rules then in place, both Pinckney and incumbent Federalist president John Adams were defeated by the Democratic-Republican candidates.

Seeing little hope of defeating popular incumbent president Thomas Jefferson, the Federalists chose Pinckney as their presidential nominee for the 1804 election. Neither Pinckney nor the party pursued an active campaign, and Jefferson won in a landslide. The Federalists nominated Pinckney again in 1808, in the hope that Pinckney's military experience and Jefferson's economic policies would give the party a chance of winning. Though the 1808 presidential election was closer than the 1804 election had been, Democratic-Republican nominee James Madison nonetheless prevailed.

== Early life and family ==
Charles Cotesworth Pinckney was born in Charlestown in the Province of South Carolina on February 25, 1746, into the planter class. He was the son of Charles Pinckney, who would later serve as the chief justice of the Province of South Carolina, and Eliza Lucas, a celebrated planter and agriculturalist, who is credited with developing indigo cultivation in this area. His younger brother, Thomas Pinckney, later served as governor of South Carolina, as did his first cousin once removed, Charles Pinckney.

In 1753, Pinckney's father moved the family to London, England, where he served as the colony's agent. Both Charles and his brother Thomas were enrolled in the Westminster School, where they continued as students after the rest of the family returned to South Carolina in 1758. Pinckney enrolled in Christ Church, Oxford, in 1763 and began studying law at Middle Temple in 1764. After a short stint at a military academy in France, Pinckney completed his studies in 1769 and was called to the English bar. He briefly practiced law in England before establishing a legal practice in Charleston.

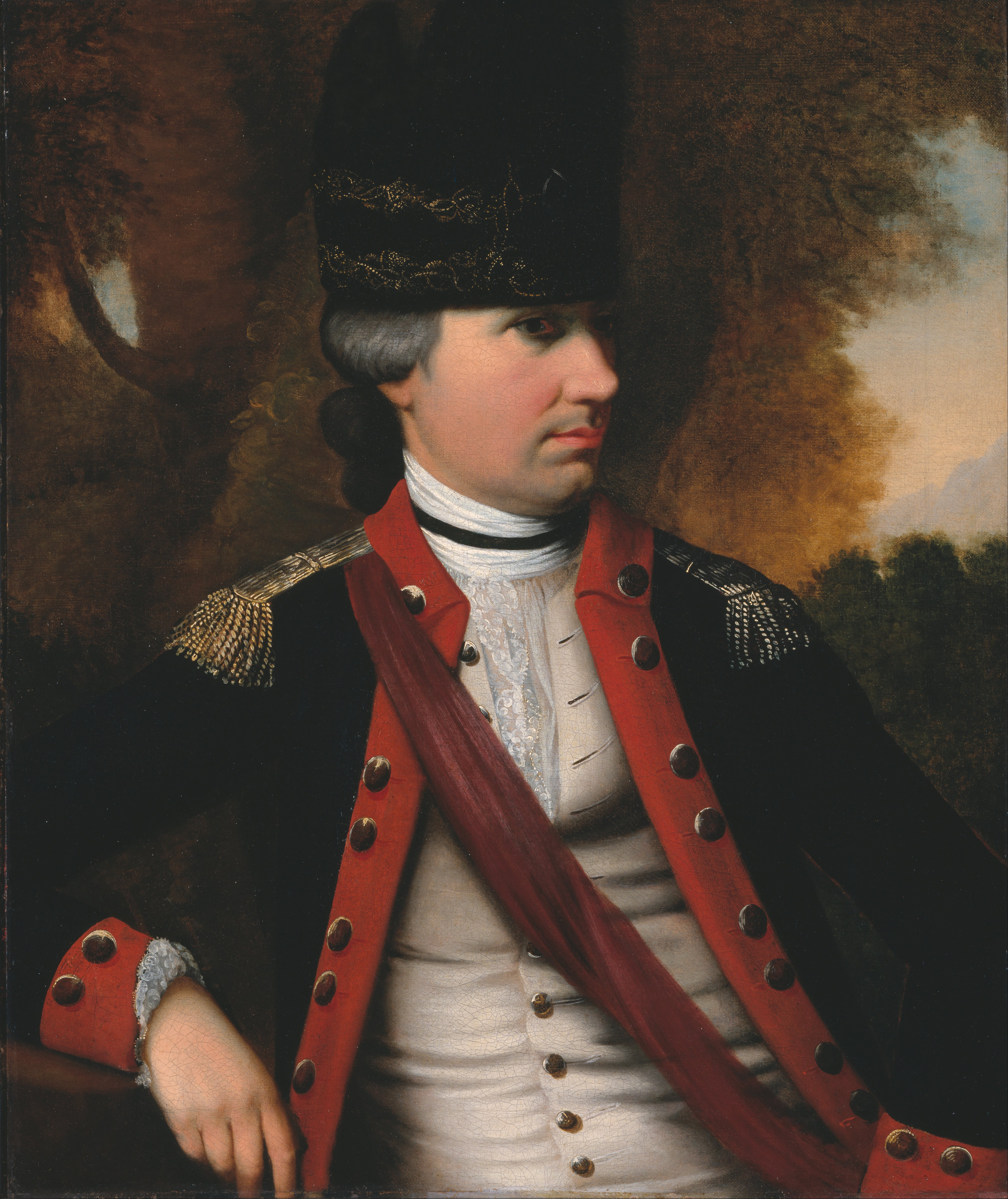
c. 1773 portrait of Pinckney by Henry Benbridge

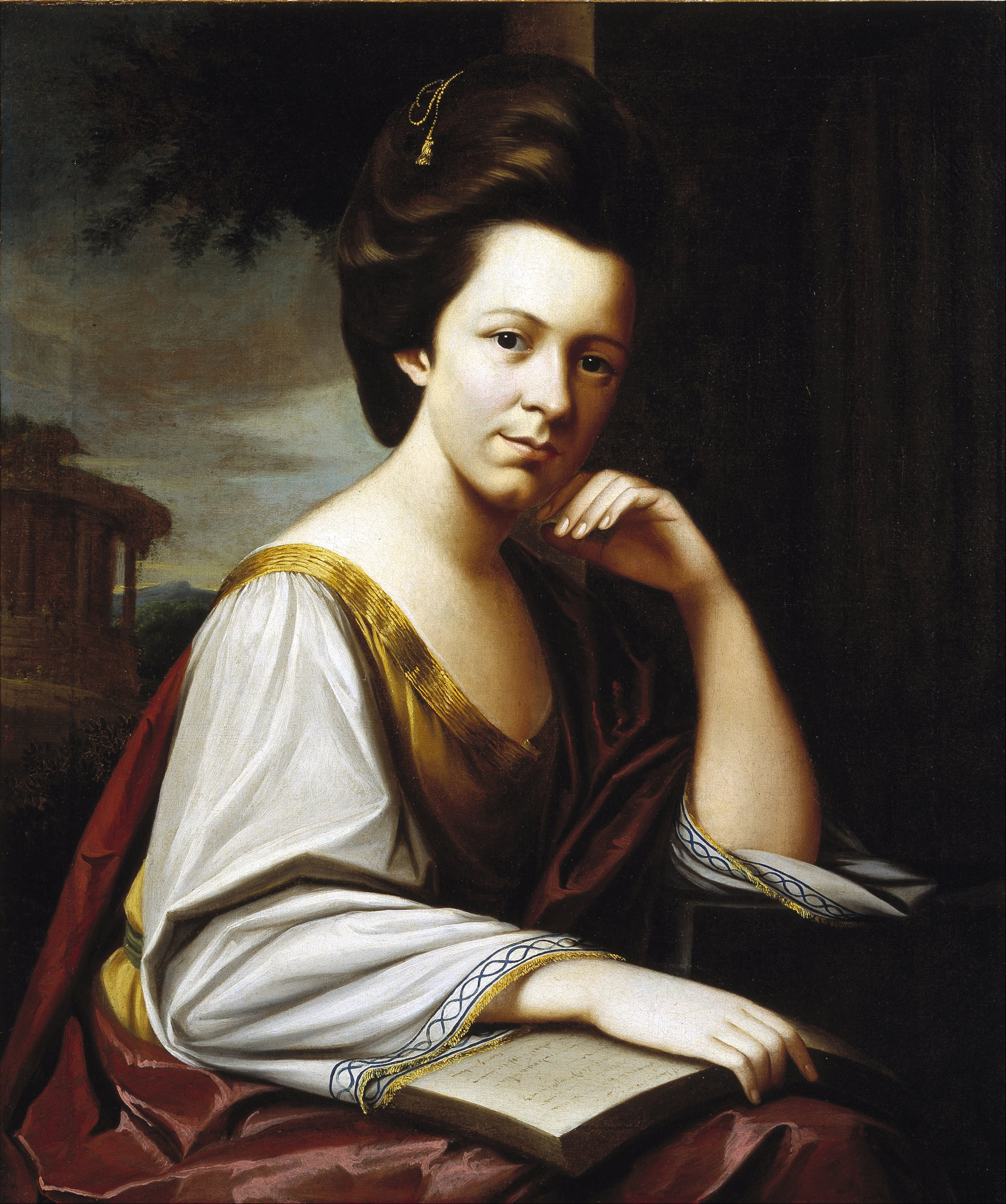
Portrait of Sarah by Benbridge

After returning to the American colonies in 1773, Pinckney married Sarah Middleton. Her father Henry Middleton later served as the second president of the Continental Congress, and her brother Arthur Middleton signed the Declaration of Independence. Sarah died in 1784. In 1786, Pinckney married again, to Mary Stead, who came from a wealthy family of planters in Georgia. Pinckney had three daughters. Pinckney's daughter, Maria Henrietta Pinckney, authored the Quintessence of Long Speeches, Arranged as a Political Catechism defending states rights and nullification.

Pinckney studied botany in France in 1769 for a year. For his assistance to the French botanist André Michaux, he was honored by having a plant species named for him: Pinckneya pubens.

== Early political career ==
After returning to South Carolina from Europe, Pinckney began to practice law in Charleston. He was first elected to a seat in the colonial legislature in 1770. In 1773 he served as a regional attorney general. When war erupted between the thirteen American colonies and Great Britain in 1775, Pinckney stood with the American Patriots; in that year he was a member of the first South Carolina provincial congress, which helped South Carolina transition from being a British colony to being an independent state. During the American Revolutionary War, he served in the lower house of the state legislature and as a member of the South Carolina Senate, in addition to his military service.

== Revolutionary War ==
Pinckney joined the colonial militia in 1772, and he helped organize South Carolina's resistance to British rule. In 1775, after the American Revolutionary War had broken out, Pinckney volunteered for military service as a full-time regular officer in George Washington's Continental Army. As a senior company commander with the rank of captain, Pinckney raised and led the elite Grenadiers of the 1st South Carolina Regiment. He participated in the successful defense of Charleston in the Battle of Sullivan's Island in June 1776, when British forces under General Sir Henry Clinton staged an amphibious attack on the state capital. Later in 1776 Pinckney took command of the regiment, with the rank of colonel, a position he retained to the end of the war.

After this, the British Army shifted its focus to the northern and mid-Atlantic states. Pinckney led his regiment north to join General Washington's troops near Philadelphia. Pinckney and his regiment participated in the Battle of Brandywine and the Battle of Germantown. Around this time he first met fellow officers Alexander Hamilton and James McHenry, who became future Federalist statesmen.

In 1778, Pinckney and his regiment, returning to the South, took part in a failed American expedition attempting to seize British East Florida. The expedition ended because of severe logistical difficulties and a British victory in the Battle of Alligator Creek Bridge. Later that year, the British Army shifted its focus to the southern theater, capturing Savannah, Georgia, in December 1778. In October 1779, the southern Army of Major General Benjamin Lincoln, with Pinckney leading one of its brigades, attempted to re-take the city in the Siege of Savannah. This attack was a disaster for the Americans, who suffered numerous casualties.

Pinckney participated in the 1780 defense of Charleston against British siege, but the city fell. Major General Lincoln surrendered his 5,000 men to the British on May 12, 1780, and Pinckney became a prisoner of war. As such, he demonstrated leadership, playing a major role in maintaining the troops' loyalty to the Patriot cause. During this time, he said, "If I had a vein that did not beat with the love of my Country, I myself would open it. If I had a drop of blood that could flow dishonorable, I myself would let it out." He was kept in close confinement until his release in 1782. In November 1783, he was commissioned a brevet brigadier general shortly before the southern regiments were disbanded. He was promoted to major general during his subsequent service in the South Carolina militia.

== Constitutional Convention ==
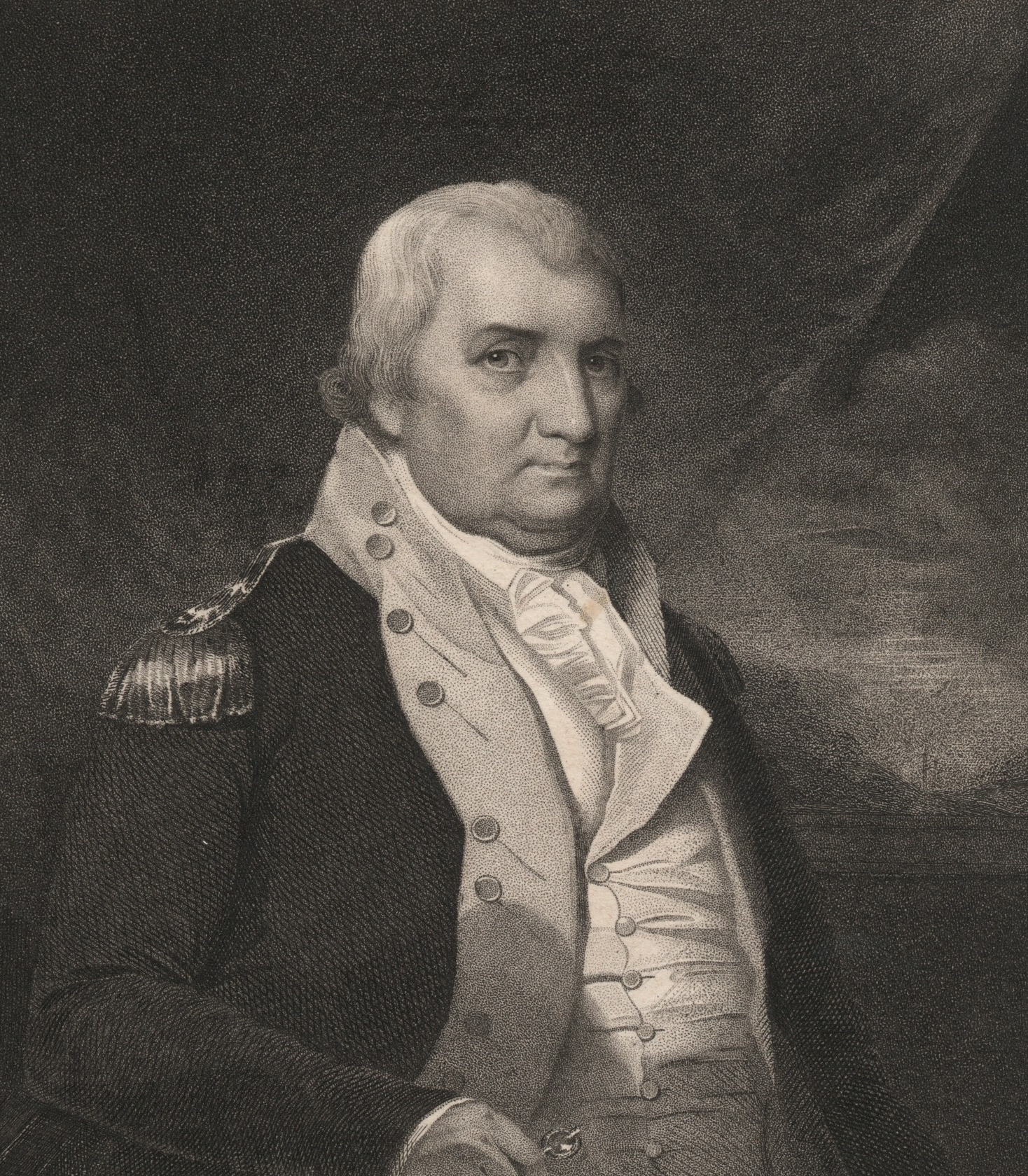
Engraving of Pinckney after an Edward Greene Malbone portrait

With the conclusion of the Revolutionary War, Pinckney returned to his legal practice, becoming one of the most acclaimed attorneys in South Carolina. He also returned to the lower house of the South Carolina legislature, and he and his brother Thomas became major political powers in the state. He became an advocate of the landed elite of the South Carolina Lowcountry, who dominated the state's government during this period. Though close friends with fellow legislator Edward Rutledge, Pinckney opposed Rutledge's attempts to end the importation of slaves, arguing that South Carolina's economy required the continual infusion of new slaves. Pinckney also took the lead in negotiating the end to a border dispute with the state of Georgia, and he signed the Convention of Beaufort, which temporarily solved some of the disputes.

The Revolutionary War had convinced many in South Carolina, including Pinckney, that the defense of the state required the cooperation of the other colonies. As such, Pinckney advocated a stronger national government than that provided by the Articles of Confederation, and he represented South Carolina at the Constitutional Convention of 1787, where his younger cousin Charles Pinckney also served as a delegate. Pinckney advocated that African American slaves be counted as a basis of representation. According to a book review in The New York Times in January 2015:

The Northwest Ordinance of July 1787 held that slaves 'may be lawfully reclaimed' from free states and territories, and soon after, a fugitive slave clause – Article IV, Section 2 – was woven into the Constitution at the insistence of the Southern delegates, leading South Carolina's Charles C. Pinckney to boast, 'We have obtained a right to recover our slaves in whatever part of America they may take refuge, which is a right we had not before.'

Pinckney advocated for a strong national government (albeit one with a system of checks and balances) to replace the weak one of the time. He opposed as impractical the election of representatives by popular vote. He also opposed paying senators, who, he thought, should be men of independent wealth. Pinckney played a key role in requiring treaties to be ratified by the Senate and in the compromise that resulted in continued American participation in the international slave trade for at least twenty years. He also opposed placing a limitation on the size of a federal standing army.

Pinckney played a prominent role in securing the ratification of the Federal Constitution in the South Carolina convention of 1788, and in framing the South Carolina Constitution in the convention of 1790. At the ratification convention, Pinckney distinguished three types of government and said republics were where "the people at large, either collectively or by representation, form the legislature". After this, he announced his retirement from politics.

== XYZ Affair ==
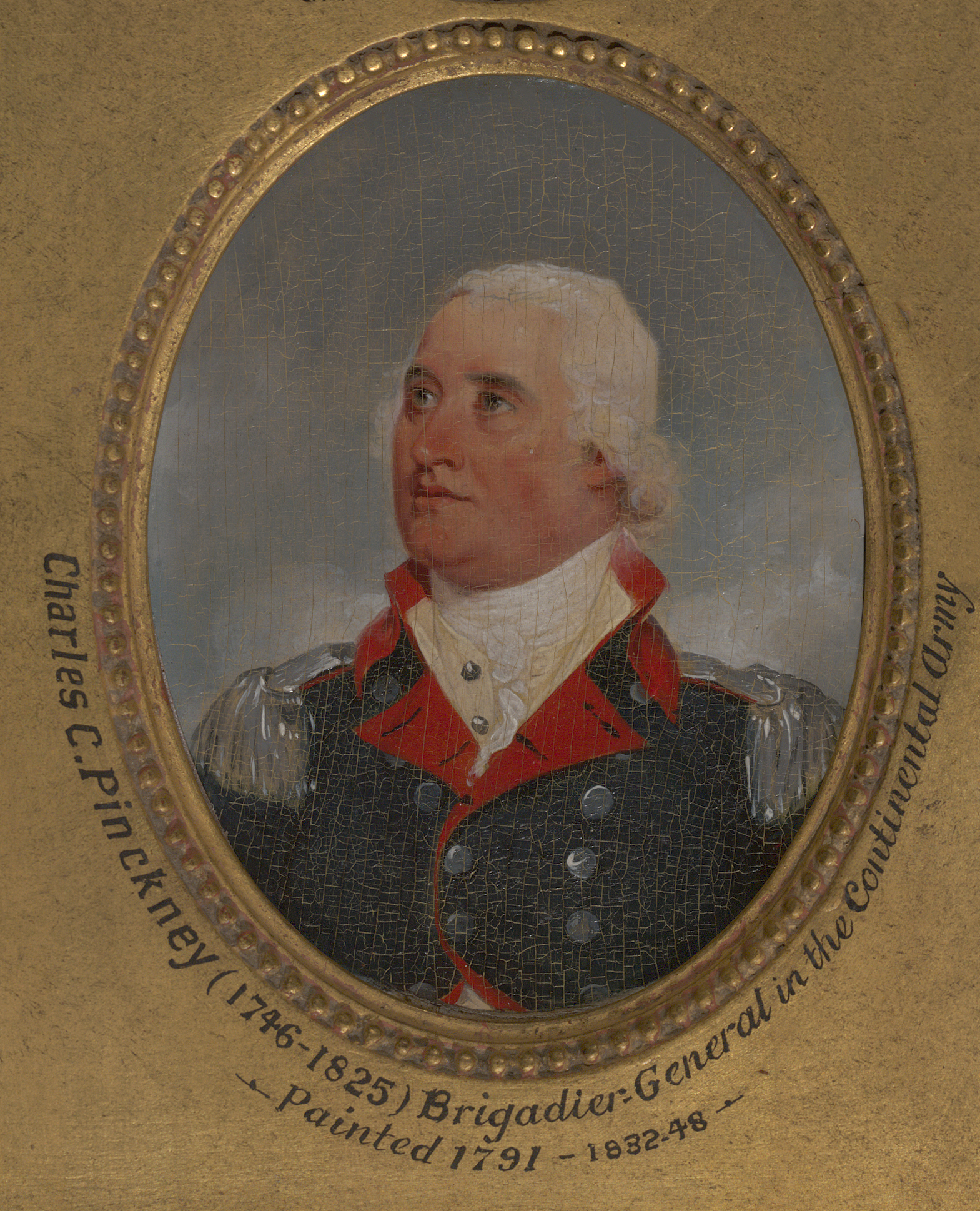
1791 miniature portrait of Pinckney by John Trumbull

In 1789, President George Washington offered Pinckney his choice of the State Department or the War Department; Pinckney declined both. When Washington offered Pinckney the role of Secretary of State in 1795, Pinckney declined but accepted the post of minister to France in 1796. Relations with the French First Republic were then at a low ebb: the Jay Treaty between the U.S. and Great Britain had angered members of the ruling French Directory, and they had ordered the French Navy to step up seizures of American merchant vessels found to be trading with Britain, with whom France was at war. When Pinckney presented his credentials in November 1796, they were refused, with the Directory stating that no ambassador could be accepted until the outstanding crisis was resolved. Pinckney was outraged by the offense.

After Pinckney reported this to the recently inaugurated President John Adams in 1797, a commission composed of Pinckney, John Marshall, and Elbridge Gerry was established to treat with the French. Gerry and Marshall joined Pinckney at The Hague and traveled to Paris in October 1797. After a cursory preliminary meeting with the new French Foreign Minister Talleyrand, the commissioners were approached informally by a series of intermediaries who spelled out French demands. These included a large loan to France, which the commissioners had been instructed to refuse, and substantial bribes for Talleyrand and members of the Directory, which the commissioners found offensive. These exchanges became the basis for what became known as the "XYZ Affair" when documents concerning them were published in 1798.

Talleyrand, who was aware of political differences in the commission (Pinckney and Marshall were Federalists who favored Britain, and Gerry wavered politically between moderate Federalist ideas and the Jeffersonian Republicans, who favored France and were strongly hostile to Britain), exploited this division in the informal discussions. Pinckney and Marshall left France in April 1798; Gerry remained behind in an unofficial capacity, seeking to moderate French demands. The breakdown of negotiations led to what became known as the undeclared Quasi-War, pitting the two nation's navies against each other.

With a potential war looming, Congress authorized the expansion of the Army, and President Adams asked Washington to take command as commander-in-chief of the Army. As a condition for accepting the position, Washington insisted that Pinckney be offered a position as a general. Washington believed that Pinckney's military experience and political support in the South made him indispensable in defending against a possible invasion by the French. Many Federalists feared that Pinckney would chafe at serving under Hamilton, who had been appointed as Washington's second-in-command, but Pinckney pleasantly surprised the Federalists by accepting his appointment as a general without complaint. Pinckney led the Army's southern department from July 1798 to June 1800.

== Presidential candidate ==
Pinckney and his political allies had resisted becoming closely allied with the Federalist or Democratic-Republican parties during the 1790s, but Pinckney began to identify as a Federalist following his return from France. With the support of Hamilton, Pinckney became the Federalist vice presidential nominee in the 1800 presidential election. (Note: Technically, Pinckney and Adams were both presidential candidates. Prior to the passage of the Twelfth Amendment in 1804, each presidential elector would cast two ballots; the highest vote-getter would become president and the runner-up would become vice president.) Pinckney's military and political service had won him national stature, and Federalists hoped that Pinckney could win some southern votes against Democratic-Republican nominee Thomas Jefferson. Hamilton had even greater hopes, as he wished to displace Adams as president and viewed Pinckney as more amenable to his policies. In-fighting between supporters of Adams and Hamilton plagued the Federalists, and the Democratic-Republicans won the election. Pinckney refused to become involved in Hamilton's plans to make him president and promised not to accept the votes of any elector who was not also pledged to Adams.

Federalists saw little hope of defeating the popular Jefferson in the 1804 election; though the party remained strong in New England, Jefferson was widely expected to win the southern and mid-Atlantic states. With little hope of winning the presidency, the Federalists nominated Pinckney as their presidential candidate, but neither Pinckney nor the Federalists pursued an active presidential campaign against Jefferson. The Federalists hoped that Pinckney's military reputation and his status as a southerner would show that the Federalist Party remained a national party, but they knew that Pinckney had little chance of winning even his own home state. Jefferson won the election in a rout, taking 162 electoral votes compared to Pinckney's 14. Pinckney's defeat in South Carolina made him the first major party presidential nominee to lose his own home state.

Jefferson's second term proved more difficult than his first, as the British and French attacked American shipping as part of the Napoleonic Wars. With Jefferson's popularity waning, Federalists entertained stronger hopes of winning back the presidency in 1808 than they had in 1804. With the support of Jefferson, James Madison was put forward as the Democratic-Republican nominee. Some Federalists favored supporting a renegade Democratic-Republican in James Monroe or George Clinton, but at the Federalist nominating convention, the party again turned to Pinckney. With a potential war against France or Britain looming, the Federalists hoped that Pinckney's military experience would appeal to the nation. The Federalists won Delaware and most of New England, but Madison won the remaining states and won a commanding majority of the electoral college.

== Final years and death ==
Coat of Arms of Charles Cotesworth Pinckney

After the 1808 election, Pinckney focused on managing his plantations and developing his legal practice. From 1805 until his death in 1825, Pinckney was president-general of the Society of the Cincinnati. Pinckney was elected a member of the American Antiquarian Society in 1813. Pinckney was elected to the American Philosophical Society in 1789.

Pinckney died on August 16, 1825, and was buried in St. Michael's Churchyard in Charleston, South Carolina. His tombstone reads, "One of the founders of the American Republic. In war he was a companion in arms and friend of Washington. In peace he enjoyed his unchanging confidence."

== Views on slavery ==
Pinckney was a life-long slave owner. He repeatedly espoused the belief that slavery was necessary to the economy of states like South Carolina and opposed emancipation. At the Constitutional Convention, he did agree to abolish the importation of slaves in 1808, but his rationale was based on how stopping this trade would increase the value of large existing slave holdings like his. In 1801, Pinckney owned about 250 slaves. When his daughter Eliza married, Pinckney gave her fifty slaves. On his death, he bequeathed his remaining slaves to his daughters and nephews.

In the South Carolina House of Representatives, on January 18, 1788, Pinckney offered several defenses for the lack of a bill of rights in the proposed U.S. Constitution. One was that bills of rights generally begin by declaring that all men are by nature born free. The reporter's summary of his observation concludes, "Now, we should make that declaration with a very bad grace, when a large part of our property consists in men who are actually born slaves."

== Memorialization ==
- Castle Pinckney in Charleston Harbor, completed about 1810, and an earlier fort on the same site, were named for Pinckney.
- Pinckney Island National Wildlife Refuge, a national wildlife refuge on the site of the Pinckney family's plantation, was named for Pinckney.
- A school in Fort Jackson, South Carolina, is called C. C. Pinckney Elementary.
- A school in Mount Pleasant, South Carolina, is called Charles Pinckney Elementary School.
- A school in Lawrence, Kansas, is called Pinckney Elementary.
- In 1942, during World War II, a 422-foot liberty ship was built in Wilmington, North Carolina, and named SS Charles C. Pinckney in his honor.
- Pinckney Street on Beacon Hill in Boston and in Madison, Wisconsin, were named in his honor.
- Pinckneyville, Illinois was named after him.
- Pinckney Highway (SC 9) in Chester, South Carolina, was named in his honor.
- Pinckneya, a monotypic genus of Rubiaceae, was named for him by L.C.M. Richard in A. Michaux's Flora Boreali-Americana.
- In the Netflix animated comedy television series The Epic Tales of Captain Underpants, Charles Cotesworth Pinckney is often brought up as something of a running gag. Often during these gags, either George, Harold, or Mr. Krupp will yell "DARN YOU, CHARLES COTESWORTH PINCKNEY!" at a painting of him.

== Bibliography ==
- Buchanan, John (1997). The Road to Guilford Courthouse. John Wiley & Sons. ISBN 9780471327165.
- Chisholm, Hugh, ed. (1911). "Pinckney, Charles Cotesworth" . Encyclopædia Britannica. Vol. 21 (11th ed.). Cambridge University Press. pp. 616–617.
- Lander, Ernest M. Jr. (1956). "The South Carolinians at the Philadelphia Convention, 1787". The South Carolina Historical Magazine. 57 (3): 134–155. JSTOR 27566067.
- Morison, Samuel E. (1912). "The First National Nominating Convention, 1808". The American Historical Review. 17 (4): 744–763. doi:10.2307/1832458. JSTOR 1832458.
- Sharp, James Roger (2010). The Deadlocked Election of 1800. University Press of Kansas. ISBN 978-0-7006-1742-5.
- Southwick, Leslie (1998). Presidential Also-Rans and Running Mates, 1788 through 1996 (Second ed.). McFarland. ISBN 0-7864-0310-1.
- Williams, Francis Leigh (1978). A Founding Family: The Pinckneys of South Carolina. Harcourt Brace Jovanovich. ISBN 978-0151315031.
- Zahniser, Marvin R. (1967). Charles Cotesworth Pinckney: Founding Father. University of North Carolina Press. OCLC 318431751.

Collier, Christopher and James Lincoln (1986). Decision in Philadelphia: The Constitutional Convention of 1787. Ballantine. ISBN 0-345-34652-1.

Diplomatic posts
Preceded by James Monroe	United States Minister to France; 1796–1797	Succeeded by Robert R. Livingston
Party political offices
Preceded by Thomas Pinckney	Federalist nominee for Vice President of the United States; 1800	Succeeded by Rufus King
Preceded by John Adams	Federalist nominee for President of the United States; 1804, 1808	Succeeded by DeWitt Clinton
Non-profit organization positions
Preceded by Alexander Hamilton	President General of the Society of the Cincinnati; 1805–1825	Succeeded by Thomas Pinckney
