= Politics of Ohio =

United States presidential election results for Ohio
Year	Republican / Whig		Democratic		Third party(ies)	
Year	No.	%	No.	%	No.	%
1824	12,280	24.55%	18,489	36.96%	19,255	38.49%
1828	63,396	48.40%	67,597	51.60%	0	0.00%
1832	76,539	48.35%	81,246	51.33%	509	0.32%
1836	104,958	51.87%	96,238	47.56%	1,137	0.56%
1840	148,157	54.10%	124,782	45.57%	903	0.33%
1844	155,113	49.68%	149,061	47.74%	8,050	2.58%
1848	138,359	42.12%	154,773	47.12%	35,347	10.76%
1852	152,523	43.18%	168,933	47.83%	31,732	8.98%
1856	187,497	48.51%	170,874	44.21%	28,126	7.28%
1860	221,809	51.24%	187,421	43.30%	23,632	5.46%
1864	265,654	56.37%	205,599	43.63%	0	0.00%
1868	280,167	54.00%	238,621	46.00%	0	0.00%
1872	281,852	53.24%	244,321	46.15%	3,263	0.62%
1876	330,698	50.21%	323,182	49.07%	4,769	0.72%
1880	375,048	51.73%	340,821	47.01%	9,098	1.25%
1884	400,082	50.99%	368,280	46.94%	16,248	2.07%
1888	416,054	49.51%	396,455	47.18%	27,852	3.31%
1892	405,187	47.66%	404,115	47.53%	40,862	4.81%
1896	525,991	51.86%	477,497	47.08%	10,807	1.07%
1900	543,918	52.30%	474,882	45.66%	21,273	2.05%
1904	600,095	59.75%	344,674	34.32%	59,624	5.94%
1908	572,312	51.03%	502,721	44.82%	46,519	4.15%
1912	278,168	26.82%	424,834	40.96%	334,092	32.21%
1916	514,753	44.18%	604,161	51.86%	46,172	3.96%
1920	1,182,022	58.47%	780,037	38.58%	59,594	2.95%
1924	1,176,130	58.33%	477,888	23.70%	362,219	17.97%
1928	1,627,546	64.89%	864,210	34.45%	16,590	0.66%
1932	1,227,319	47.03%	1,301,695	49.88%	80,714	3.09%
1936	1,127,855	37.44%	1,747,140	57.99%	137,594	4.57%
1940	1,586,773	47.80%	1,733,139	52.20%	0	0.00%
1944	1,582,293	50.18%	1,570,763	49.82%	0	0.00%
1948	1,445,684	49.24%	1,452,791	49.48%	37,596	1.28%
1952	2,100,391	56.76%	1,600,367	43.24%	0	0.00%
1956	2,262,610	61.11%	1,439,655	38.89%	0	0.00%
1960	2,217,611	53.28%	1,944,248	46.72%	0	0.00%
1964	1,470,865	37.06%	2,498,331	62.94%	0	0.00%
1968	1,791,014	45.23%	1,700,586	42.95%	468,098	11.82%
1972	2,441,827	59.63%	1,558,889	38.07%	94,071	2.30%
1976	2,000,505	48.65%	2,011,621	48.92%	99,747	2.43%
1980	2,206,545	51.51%	1,752,414	40.91%	324,644	7.58%
1984	2,678,560	58.90%	1,825,440	40.14%	43,619	0.96%
1988	2,416,549	55.00%	1,939,629	44.15%	37,521	0.85%
1992	1,894,310	38.35%	1,984,942	40.18%	1,060,712	21.47%
1996	1,859,883	41.02%	2,148,222	47.38%	526,329	11.61%
2000	2,351,209	49.97%	2,186,190	46.46%	168,058	3.57%
2004	2,859,768	50.81%	2,741,167	48.71%	26,973	0.48%
2008	2,677,820	46.80%	2,940,044	51.38%	103,967	1.82%
2012	2,661,437	47.60%	2,827,709	50.58%	101,788	1.82%
2016	2,841,006	51.31%	2,394,169	43.24%	301,372	5.44%
2020	3,154,834	53.18%	2,679,165	45.16%	98,447	1.66%
2024	3,180,117	54.88%	2,533,700	43.73%	80,521	1.39%

Political control of Ohio has oscillated between the two major parties. Republicans outnumber Democrats in Ohio government. The governor, Mike DeWine, is a Republican, as are all other non-judicial statewide elected officials: Lieutenant Governor of Ohio Jim Tressel, Ohio Attorney General Dave Yost, Ohio State Auditor Keith Faber, Ohio Secretary of State Frank LaRose and Ohio State Treasurer Robert Sprague.

In the Ohio State Senate, the Republicans have a supermajority (26–7), and in the Ohio House of Representatives the Republicans also have a supermajority delegation (66–32), and they have generally held the legislature since the latter half of the 20th century. The Ohio congressional delegation is mostly Republican as well; 10 representatives are Republicans while five are Democrats. Both U.S. senators, Bernie Moreno and Jon Husted, are Republicans.

The mayors of most of the 10 largest cities in the state (Columbus, Cleveland, Cincinnati, Toledo, Akron, Dayton, Youngstown, Canton, Parma, Lorain) are Democrats. The Republicans are strongest in the rural Northwest, the affluent Cincinnati and Columbus suburbs, and have made gains in Appalachian Southeast Ohio and the industrial, working-class Northeast in the 21st century. The Democrats rely on the state's major cities, and have made gains in educated suburban areas in recent years.

The state was strongly Republican from the party's inception, voting Republican in every election from 1856 to 1908. The northern Union-aligned part of the state kept the state Republican, and consistently narrowly edged out the Democratic and Appalachia-influenced southern Ohio. Since 1896, however, Ohio has voted for the winning candidate, except for Franklin D Roosevelt in 1944, John F Kennedy in 1960, and Joe Biden in 2020. This was due to Democratic gains in the northeastern part of the state. The state has not backed a losing candidate in consecutive elections since 1848. Due to a close split in party registration, it has been a key battleground state. No Republican has ever been elected president without winning Ohio. In 2004, Ohio was the tipping point state, as Bush won the state with 51% of the vote, giving him its 20 electoral votes and the margin he needed in the Electoral College for re-election. The state was closely contested in 2008 and 2012, with Barack Obama winning narrowly on both occasions. Ohio has been a bellwether state in presidential elections.

Since 2016, Ohio's bellwether status has been questioned given that Donald Trump won it by eight points, the largest margin for a candidate from either party since 1988, and then won the state by a similar margin in 2020 despite losing nationwide.

Ohio's presidential electoral vote total has been declining for decades. Ohio lost two electoral votes after the results of the 2010 United States census, leaving it with 18 electoral votes for the presidential elections in 2012, 2016, and 2020. The number of electoral votes was down from 20 in the 2004 and 2008 elections, and down from a peak of 26 in 1964 and 1968. As of 2020, Ohio has its fewest electoral votes since 1828, when it cast 16. The state cast 3.71 percent of all electoral votes from 2004 through 2020, the smallest percentage since it cast 3.40 percent of the votes in 1820.

Ohio's large population has long made the state a major influence in politics. Seven presidents have been from Ohio, all Republicans: William Henry Harrison, Ulysses S. Grant, Rutherford B. Hayes, James A. Garfield, William McKinley, William Howard Taft and Warren G. Harding.

== Parties ==
As of September 18, 2024, there were three recognized political parties in Ohio.

Democratic
Republican
Libertarian

Party registration as of May 10, 2024
Party	Total voters	Percentage
Unaffiliated	5,734,850	71.1%
Democratic	817,063	10.1%
Republican	1,508,641	17.5%
Total	8,060,554	100%

There is also one deregistered party that has an active executive committee.

The Greens
Charter Party
Working Families Party
Communist Party
Constitution Party
Forward Ohio
Party for Socialism and Liberation

== Federal representation ==
Following each decennial census, the General Assembly, with the approval of the governor, draws the U.S. congressional districts for Ohio's seats in the United States House of Representatives (the Ohio Apportionment Board draws state legislative districts). Ohio currently has 15 House districts. In the 119th Congress, five of Ohio's seats are held by Democrats and 10 are held by Republicans:

- Ohio's 1st congressional district represented by Greg Landsman (D)
- Ohio's 2nd congressional district represented by David Taylor (R)
- Ohio's 3rd congressional district represented by Joyce Beatty (D)
- Ohio's 4th congressional district represented by Jim Jordan (R)
- Ohio's 5th congressional district represented by Bob Latta (R)
- Ohio's 6th congressional district represented by Michael Rulli (R)
- Ohio's 7th congressional district represented by Max Miller (R)
- Ohio's 8th congressional district represented by Warren Davidson (R)
- Ohio's 9th congressional district represented by Marcy Kaptur (D)
- Ohio's 10th congressional district represented by Mike Turner (R)
- Ohio's 11th congressional district represented by Shontel Brown (D)
- Ohio's 12th congressional district represented by Troy Balderson (R)
- Ohio's 13th congressional district represented by Emilia Sykes (D)
- Ohio's 14th congressional district represented by Dave Joyce (R)
- Ohio's 15th congressional district represented by Mike Carey (R)

Ohio's two United States senators are Republicans Bernie Moreno and Jon Husted, both beginning their terms in 2025.

Ohio is part of the United States District Court for the Northern District of Ohio and the United States District Court for the Southern District of Ohio in the federal judiciary. The district's cases are appealed to the Cincinnati-based United States Court of Appeals for the Sixth Circuit.

== See also ==
- Government of Ohio
- Elections in Ohio
- Political Party Strength in Ohio
  - Ohio Democratic Party
  - Ohio Republican Party
  - Libertarian Party of Ohio
  - Charter Party of Cincinnati, Ohio
  - Green Party of Ohio
