= 1928 United States presidential election in Ohio =

- November 6, 1928

Nominee	Herbert Hoover	Al Smith
Party	Republican	Democratic
Home state	California	New York
Running mate	Charles Curtis	Joseph T. Robinson
Electoral vote	24	0
Popular vote	1,627,546	864,210
Percentage	64.89%	34.45%
County results
Hoover
50–60%
60–70%
70–80%
80–90%
Smith
50–60%
President before election
Calvin Coolidge
Republican
Elected President
Herbert Hoover
Republican

The 1928 United States presidential election in Ohio was held on November 6, 1928, as part of the 1928 United States presidential election. State voters chose 24 electors to the Electoral College, who voted for president and vice president.

Between 1856 and 1908, Ohio had voted consistently, though generally narrowly, for Republican candidates, because the heavily Yankee northeast and Ohio Company counties of the southeast slightly outvoted the Copperhead Appalachian south and German-American counties of the northwest. Woodrow Wilson, who grew up in Appalachia whose culture exert a major influence on Buckeye State politics, would carry the state in both of his winning presidential campaigns in 1912 and 1916. However, reaction against Democratic nominee James M. Cox, who had opposed the teaching of German in schools when the state's Governor, meant Ohio went Republican by a 20% margin in the landslide of 1920, and five counties went Republican for the first time ever.

In 1924, John W. Davis, although a native of adjacent and culturally allied West Virginia, had negligible support in the Yankee- and German-settled areas of northern and central Ohio. Thus, Davis received barely half the proportion that Cox had, as he was further handicapped by his indecisiveness towards the powerful Ku Klux Klan, and by the complete lack of support from local Democrats in the interests of state offices. Progressive Robert La Follette would receive over 17% of Ohio's vote, close to his national average but his best state east of the Mississippi and Illinois Rivers.

For 1928, the Democrats nominated almost by default Al Smith, an urban New York Catholic. Although he was endorsed by La Follette after his 1925 death, Smith was handicapped in urban Ohio by the state's cities' large population from Appalachian regions of the South, who refused rigidly to vote for a Catholic. Similar sentiments were felt amongst traditionally Democratic German Protestants in the central part of the state; in heavily Amish Holmes County, which had still held the line for Cox and Davis by double digits, Hoover not only was the first ever Republican victor but also won over two-thirds of the county's vote.

By the week of the election, Hoover was overwhelmingly favored to carry the state, and ultimately he won 64.89% of the popular vote in the state. This stands as the best popular vote percentage ever recorded by any presidential candidate in Ohio since 1820, when James Monroe ran unopposed.

== Results ==
1928 United States presidential election in Ohio
Party	Candidate	Votes	Percentage	Electoral votes
Republican	Herbert Hoover	1,627,546	64.89%	24
Democratic	Al Smith	864,210	34.45%	0
Socialist	Norman Thomas	8,683	0.35%	0
Prohibition	William F. Varney	3,556	0.14%	0
Workers	William Foster	2,836	0.11%	0
Socialist Labor	Verne L. Reynolds	1,515	0.06%	0
Totals		2,508,346	100.0%	24

=== Results by county ===
County	Herbert Clark Hoover Republican		Alfred Emmanual Smith Democratic		Norman Matton Thomas Socialist		Various candidates Other parties		Margin		Total votes cast
County	#	%	#	%	#	%	#	%	#	%	Total votes cast
Adams	5,665	65.23%	3,000	34.54%	2	0.02%	18	0.21%	2,665	30.69%	8,685
Allen	20,693	68.21%	9,462	31.19%	94	0.31%	88	0.29%	11,231	37.02%	30,337
Ashland	8,745	72.29%	3,256	26.92%	22	0.18%	74	0.61%	5,489	45.37%	12,097
Ashtabula	18,870	75.13%	5,951	23.69%	133	0.53%	164	0.65%	12,919	51.43%	25,118
Athens	11,101	70.02%	4,546	28.67%	136	0.86%	72	0.45%	6,555	41.34%	15,855
Auglaize	7,794	60.91%	4,954	38.72%	20	0.16%	28	0.22%	2,840	22.19%	12,796
Belmont	20,969	60.84%	12,807	37.16%	249	0.72%	443	1.29%	8,162	23.68%	34,468
Brown	5,681	62.05%	3,422	37.38%	13	0.14%	39	0.43%	2,259	24.68%	9,155
Butler	29,124	64.66%	15,663	34.77%	153	0.34%	102	0.23%	13,461	29.89%	45,042
Carroll	5,572	80.32%	1,321	19.04%	21	0.30%	23	0.33%	4,251	61.28%	6,937
Champaign	7,651	69.52%	3,296	29.95%	20	0.18%	39	0.35%	4,355	39.57%	11,006
Clark	26,666	71.72%	10,316	27.74%	104	0.28%	97	0.26%	16,350	43.97%	37,183
Clermont	9,732	69.60%	4,194	29.99%	26	0.19%	31	0.22%	5,538	39.61%	13,983
Clinton	7,150	72.98%	2,603	26.57%	13	0.13%	31	0.32%	4,547	46.41%	9,797
Columbiana	26,405	77.30%	7,461	21.84%	136	0.40%	156	0.46%	18,944	55.46%	34,158
Coshocton	9,154	70.58%	3,745	28.87%	23	0.18%	48	0.37%	5,409	41.70%	12,970
Crawford	11,235	66.90%	5,472	32.59%	44	0.26%	42	0.25%	5,763	34.32%	16,793
Cuyahoga	194,508	53.42%	166,188	45.64%	2,006	0.55%	1,406	0.39%	28,320	7.78%	364,108
Darke	11,765	66.34%	5,822	32.83%	27	0.15%	120	0.68%	5,943	33.51%	17,734
Defiance	6,289	64.33%	3,487	35.67%	0	0.00%	0	0.00%	2,802	28.66%	9,776
Delaware	8,049	67.75%	3,720	31.31%	21	0.18%	90	0.76%	4,329	36.44%	11,880
Erie	10,380	57.68%	7,570	42.06%	33	0.18%	13	0.07%	2,810	15.61%	17,996
Fairfield	12,072	67.87%	5,619	31.59%	38	0.21%	59	0.33%	6,453	36.28%	17,788
Fayette	5,251	65.23%	2,752	34.19%	17	0.21%	30	0.37%	2,499	31.04%	8,050
Franklin	92,019	65.86%	47,084	33.70%	367	0.26%	242	0.17%	44,935	32.16%	139,712
Fulton	6,416	77.74%	1,788	21.66%	12	0.15%	37	0.45%	4,628	56.08%	8,253
Gallia	5,513	73.42%	1,916	25.52%	30	0.40%	50	0.67%	3,597	47.90%	7,509
Geauga	4,161	77.37%	1,180	21.94%	23	0.43%	14	0.26%	2,981	55.43%	5,378
Greene	10,030	74.14%	3,385	25.02%	52	0.38%	61	0.45%	6,645	49.12%	13,528
Guernsey	11,174	74.10%	3,709	24.60%	93	0.62%	104	0.69%	7,465	49.50%	15,080
Hamilton	147,534	57.03%	110,151	42.58%	701	0.27%	306	0.12%	37,383	14.45%	258,692
Hancock	13,151	75.54%	4,158	23.88%	34	0.20%	67	0.38%	8,993	51.65%	17,410
Hardin	8,137	60.20%	5,306	39.25%	27	0.20%	47	0.35%	2,831	20.94%	13,517
Harrison	6,095	79.40%	1,516	19.75%	10	0.13%	55	0.72%	4,579	59.65%	7,676
Henry	5,370	59.29%	3,647	40.27%	16	0.18%	24	0.26%	1,723	19.02%	9,057
Highland	8,325	68.12%	3,836	31.39%	18	0.15%	42	0.34%	4,489	36.73%	12,221
Hocking	5,497	67.92%	2,502	30.92%	70	0.86%	24	0.30%	2,995	37.01%	8,093
Holmes	3,457	67.43%	1,631	31.81%	19	0.37%	20	0.39%	1,826	35.62%	5,127
Huron	10,702	67.18%	5,157	32.37%	33	0.21%	38	0.24%	5,545	34.81%	15,930
Jackson	7,129	71.40%	2,775	27.79%	39	0.39%	42	0.42%	4,354	43.61%	9,985
Jefferson	19,175	68.09%	8,711	30.93%	119	0.42%	156	0.55%	10,464	37.16%	28,161
Knox	10,028	73.07%	3,601	26.24%	33	0.24%	62	0.45%	6,427	46.83%	13,724
Lake	11,823	74.24%	4,024	25.27%	35	0.22%	44	0.28%	7,799	48.97%	15,926
Lawrence	10,346	74.51%	3,470	24.99%	48	0.35%	21	0.15%	6,876	49.52%	13,885
Licking	19,130	72.14%	7,244	27.32%	76	0.29%	67	0.25%	11,886	44.82%	26,517
Logan	9,602	76.63%	2,858	22.81%	19	0.15%	52	0.41%	6,744	53.82%	12,531
Lorain	24,386	63.83%	13,607	35.62%	129	0.34%	83	0.22%	10,779	28.21%	38,205
Lucas	78,435	63.21%	44,977	36.25%	318	0.26%	351	0.28%	33,458	26.96%	124,081
Madison	5,522	68.13%	2,527	31.18%	14	0.17%	42	0.52%	2,995	36.95%	8,105
Mahoning	48,341	63.82%	26,928	35.55%	199	0.26%	280	0.37%	21,413	28.27%	75,748
Marion	13,398	70.29%	5,468	28.69%	145	0.76%	49	0.26%	7,930	41.61%	19,060
Medina	9,510	79.58%	2,357	19.72%	44	0.37%	39	0.33%	7,153	59.86%	11,950
Meigs	6,580	70.65%	2,661	28.57%	44	0.47%	29	0.31%	3,919	42.08%	9,314
Mercer	5,129	45.29%	6,155	54.34%	10	0.09%	32	0.28%	-1,026	-9.06%	11,326
Miami	16,063	72.80%	5,867	26.59%	73	0.33%	63	0.29%	10,196	46.21%	22,066
Monroe	4,287	60.73%	2,729	38.66%	14	0.20%	29	0.41%	1,558	22.07%	7,059
Montgomery	71,279	64.53%	38,517	34.87%	506	0.46%	159	0.14%	32,762	29.66%	110,461
Morgan	4,359	75.09%	1,397	24.07%	12	0.21%	37	0.64%	2,962	51.02%	5,805
Morrow	4,801	71.67%	1,818	27.14%	23	0.34%	57	0.85%	2,983	44.53%	6,699
Muskingum	22,120	76.81%	6,507	22.60%	79	0.27%	92	0.32%	15,613	54.22%	28,798
Noble	4,462	66.45%	2,190	32.61%	17	0.25%	46	0.69%	2,272	33.83%	6,715
Ottawa	5,772	62.54%	3,435	37.22%	14	0.15%	8	0.09%	2,337	25.32%	9,229
Paulding	4,093	61.79%	2,473	37.33%	22	0.33%	36	0.54%	1,620	24.46%	6,624
Perry	8,551	64.39%	4,653	35.04%	35	0.26%	40	0.30%	3,898	29.35%	13,279
Pickaway	5,871	59.87%	3,894	39.71%	8	0.08%	33	0.34%	1,977	20.16%	9,806
Pike	3,246	54.51%	2,709	45.49%	0	0.00%	0	0.00%	537	9.02%	5,955
Portage	12,086	71.31%	4,756	28.06%	58	0.34%	48	0.28%	7,330	43.25%	16,948
Preble	6,693	65.21%	3,513	34.23%	22	0.21%	35	0.34%	3,180	30.99%	10,263
Putnam	5,337	48.28%	5,667	51.27%	21	0.19%	29	0.26%	-330	-2.99%	11,054
Richland	18,468	71.28%	7,295	28.16%	55	0.21%	91	0.35%	11,173	43.12%	25,909
Ross	11,179	64.59%	6,062	35.02%	31	0.18%	36	0.21%	5,117	29.56%	17,308
Sandusky	12,200	67.33%	5,834	32.20%	55	0.30%	30	0.17%	6,366	35.13%	18,119
Scioto	20,997	73.60%	7,425	26.03%	70	0.25%	38	0.13%	13,572	47.57%	28,530
Seneca	13,369	61.93%	8,136	37.69%	35	0.16%	47	0.22%	5,233	24.24%	21,587
Shelby	5,975	52.14%	5,448	47.54%	13	0.11%	24	0.21%	527	4.60%	11,460
Stark	59,564	70.85%	23,840	28.36%	415	0.49%	256	0.30%	35,724	42.49%	84,075
Summit	78,504	70.86%	31,506	28.44%	388	0.35%	387	0.35%	46,998	42.42%	110,785
Trumbull	29,710	75.80%	9,110	23.24%	208	0.53%	166	0.42%	20,600	52.56%	39,194
Tuscarawas	20,494	74.34%	6,805	24.68%	163	0.59%	106	0.38%	13,689	49.66%	27,568
Union	5,876	70.53%	2,386	28.64%	22	0.26%	47	0.56%	3,490	41.89%	8,331
Van Wert	7,540	59.39%	5,089	40.08%	21	0.17%	46	0.36%	2,451	19.31%	12,696
Vinton	2,810	63.75%	1,559	35.37%	15	0.34%	24	0.54%	1,251	28.38%	4,408
Warren	8,708	77.62%	2,455	21.88%	24	0.21%	32	0.29%	6,253	55.74%	11,219
Washington	12,767	73.18%	4,582	26.26%	52	0.30%	46	0.26%	8,185	46.91%	17,447
Wayne	14,192	74.60%	4,825	25.36%	6	0.03%	1	0.01%	9,367	49.24%	19,024
Williams	8,138	71.81%	3,136	27.67%	19	0.17%	39	0.34%	5,002	44.14%	11,332
Wood	15,409	76.56%	4,612	22.92%	53	0.26%	52	0.26%	10,797	53.65%	20,126
Wyandot	5,790	65.41%	3,024	34.16%	6	0.07%	32	0.36%	2,766	31.25%	8,852
Totals	1,627,546	64.89%	864,210	34.45%	8,683	0.35%	7,907 (Note: Two of these "other" votes were not distributed by county, and there are some conflicts between individual and total figures for Foster and Reynolds.)	0.32%	763,336	30.43%	2,508,346

== See also ==
- United States presidential elections in Ohio
