= 1916 United States presidential election in Ohio =

- November 7, 1916

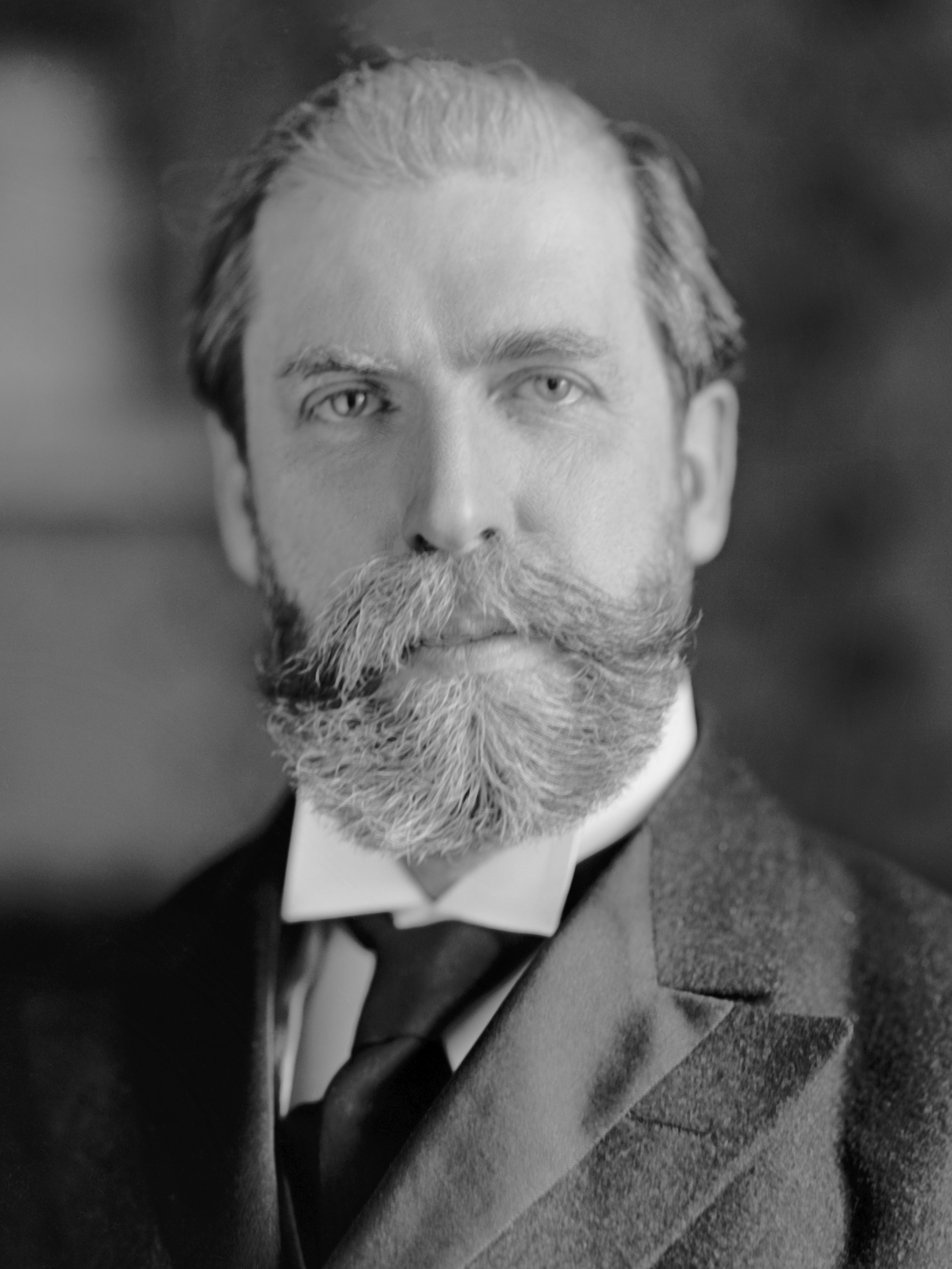
Nominee	Woodrow Wilson	Charles Evans Hughes
Party	Democratic	Republican
Home state	New Jersey	New York
Running mate	Thomas R. Marshall	Charles W. Fairbanks
Electoral vote	24	0
Popular vote	604,161	514,753
Percentage	51.86%	44.18%
County results
Wilson
40–50%
50–60%
60–70%
70–80%
Hughes
40–50%
50–60%
President before election
Woodrow Wilson
Democratic
Elected President
Woodrow Wilson
Democratic

The 1916 United States presidential election in Ohio was held on November 7, 1916. State voters chose 24 electors to the Electoral College, who voted for president and vice president.

Ohio was won by the Democratic Party candidate, incumbent President Woodrow Wilson, who won the state with 51.86 percent of the popular vote. The Republican Party candidate, Charles Evans Hughes, garnered 44.18 percent of the popular vote. Wilson's large margin of victory was attributed to Ohio's large German-American population at the time, who favored Wilson.

As a result of his win in Ohio, Wilson became the first Democratic presidential candidate since Andrew Jackson in 1832 to win Ohio with a majority of the votes, although three Democrats in the intervening period – Wilson himself in 1912, Franklin Pierce in 1852, and Lewis Cass in 1848 – had won the state with pluralities.

As of the 2024 presidential election, this is the last election in which Delaware County voted for a Democratic presidential candidate, the longest county voting streak for either party in the state.

== Results ==
1916 United States presidential election in Ohio
Party	Candidate	Votes	Percentage	Electoral votes
Democratic	Woodrow Wilson (incumbent)	604,161	51.86%	24
Republican	Charles E. Hughes	514,753	44.18%	0
Socialist	Allan L. Benson	38,092	3.27%	0
Prohibition	Frank Hanly	8,080	0.69%	0
Totals		1,165,086	100.0%	24

=== Results by county ===
County	Thomas Woodrow Wilson Democratic		Charles Evans Hughes Republican		Allan Louis Benson Socialist		James Franklin Hanly Prohibition		Margin		Total votes cast
County	#	%	#	%	#	%	#	%	#	%	Total votes cast
Adams	2,887	49.38%	2,819	48.21%	107	1.83%	34	0.58%	68	1.16%	5,847
Allen	7,905	55.91%	5,713	40.40%	411	2.91%	111	0.79%	2,192	15.50%	14,140
Ashland	4,000	59.89%	2,534	37.94%	97	1.45%	48	0.72%	1,466	21.95%	6,679
Ashtabula	5,306	42.02%	6,608	52.34%	569	4.51%	143	1.13%	-1,302	-10.31%	12,626
Athens	4,101	40.74%	5,554	55.18%	338	3.36%	73	0.73%	-1,453	-14.43%	10,066
Auglaize	4,124	57.48%	2,763	38.51%	246	3.43%	42	0.59%	1,361	18.97%	7,175
Belmont	7,911	46.41%	7,526	44.15%	1,387	8.14%	222	1.30%	385	2.26%	17,046
Brown	3,959	63.43%	2,227	35.68%	45	0.72%	11	0.18%	1,732	27.75%	6,242
Butler	10,806	58.75%	5,850	31.81%	1,625	8.84%	111	0.60%	4,956	26.95%	18,392
Carroll	1,672	43.04%	2,086	53.69%	61	1.57%	66	1.70%	-414	-10.66%	3,885
Champaign	3,338	46.80%	3,695	51.80%	70	0.98%	30	0.42%	-357	-5.00%	7,133
Clark	8,848	48.37%	8,715	47.64%	538	2.94%	192	1.05%	133	0.73%	18,293
Clermont	4,247	53.56%	3,549	44.76%	106	1.34%	27	0.34%	698	8.80%	7,929
Clinton	2,602	41.83%	3,520	56.58%	52	0.84%	47	0.76%	-918	-14.76%	6,221
Columbiana	7,788	44.95%	8,118	46.85%	999	5.77%	421	2.43%	-330	-1.90%	17,326
Coshocton	4,269	56.60%	2,831	37.53%	284	3.77%	159	2.11%	1,438	19.06%	7,543
Crawford	6,014	67.05%	2,673	29.80%	215	2.40%	68	0.76%	3,341	37.25%	8,970
Cuyahoga	71,533	55.49%	51,287	39.79%	5,662	4.39%	418	0.32%	20,246	15.71%	128,900
Darke	6,186	56.94%	4,322	39.78%	115	1.06%	242	2.23%	1,864	17.16%	10,865
Defiance	3,359	55.47%	2,565	42.36%	97	1.60%	34	0.56%	794	13.11%	6,055
Delaware	3,754	50.95%	3,461	46.97%	49	0.67%	104	1.41%	293	3.98%	7,368
Erie	5,152	53.27%	4,170	43.12%	317	3.28%	32	0.33%	982	10.15%	9,671
Fairfield	6,172	63.34%	3,380	34.69%	111	1.14%	81	0.83%	2,792	28.65%	9,744
Fayette	2,616	47.69%	2,772	50.53%	67	1.22%	31	0.57%	-156	-2.84%	5,486
Franklin	34,103	57.10%	24,107	40.36%	1,172	1.96%	345	0.58%	9,996	16.74%	59,727
Fulton	2,507	45.28%	2,933	52.97%	69	1.25%	28	0.51%	-426	-7.69%	5,537
Gallia	2,277	43.55%	2,860	54.71%	67	1.28%	24	0.46%	-583	-11.15%	5,228
Geauga	1,345	41.80%	1,806	56.12%	43	1.34%	24	0.75%	-461	-14.33%	3,218
Greene	2,913	37.86%	4,458	57.93%	209	2.72%	115	1.49%	-1,545	-20.08%	7,695
Guernsey	4,312	45.65%	4,228	44.76%	776	8.22%	130	1.38%	84	0.89%	9,446
Hamilton	51,990	43.30%	64,030	53.33%	3,739	3.11%	310	0.26%	-12,040	-10.03%	120,069
Hancock	5,416	54.29%	4,268	42.78%	211	2.12%	81	0.81%	1,148	11.51%	9,976
Hardin	4,304	50.24%	4,119	48.08%	113	1.32%	31	0.36%	185	2.16%	8,567
Harrison	1,911	42.33%	2,517	55.76%	50	1.11%	36	0.80%	-606	-13.42%	4,514
Henry	3,252	55.47%	2,482	42.33%	91	1.55%	38	0.65%	770	13.13%	5,863
Highland	3,964	50.85%	3,727	47.81%	60	0.77%	45	0.58%	237	3.04%	7,796
Hocking	2,907	53.59%	2,357	43.45%	134	2.47%	27	0.50%	550	10.14%	5,425
Holmes	2,846	73.64%	955	24.71%	43	1.11%	21	0.54%	1,891	48.93%	3,865
Huron	4,136	49.36%	4,048	48.31%	139	1.66%	57	0.68%	88	1.05%	8,380
Jackson	2,922	47.11%	3,116	50.23%	127	2.05%	38	0.61%	-194	-3.13%	6,203
Jefferson	5,250	41.94%	6,658	53.19%	500	3.99%	109	0.87%	-1,408	-11.25%	12,517
Knox	4,578	54.61%	3,646	43.49%	96	1.15%	63	0.75%	932	11.12%	8,383
Lake	2,596	46.21%	2,887	51.39%	106	1.89%	29	0.52%	-291	-5.18%	5,618
Lawrence	2,821	38.21%	4,363	59.10%	165	2.24%	33	0.45%	-1,542	-20.89%	7,382
Licking	8,183	56.43%	5,935	40.93%	268	1.85%	114	0.79%	2,248	15.50%	14,500
Logan	3,483	43.93%	4,345	54.80%	45	0.57%	56	0.71%	-862	-10.87%	7,929
Lorain	7,658	50.91%	6,868	45.66%	464	3.08%	52	0.35%	790	5.25%	15,042
Lucas	30,779	60.80%	16,711	33.01%	3,000	5.93%	136	0.27%	14,068	27.79%	50,626
Madison	2,667	48.35%	2,809	50.92%	16	0.29%	24	0.44%	-142	-2.57%	5,516
Mahoning	13,013	51.59%	11,256	44.62%	741	2.94%	215	0.85%	1,757	6.97%	25,225
Marion	5,273	53.53%	4,264	43.29%	264	2.68%	49	0.50%	1,009	10.24%	9,850
Medina	2,984	50.71%	2,754	46.80%	111	1.89%	36	0.61%	230	3.91%	5,885
Meigs	2,628	43.57%	3,184	52.79%	189	3.13%	30	0.50%	-556	-9.22%	6,031
Mercer	3,803	62.27%	2,065	33.81%	55	0.90%	184	3.01%	1,738	28.46%	6,107
Miami	5,582	47.01%	5,772	48.61%	433	3.65%	86	0.72%	-190	-1.60%	11,873
Monroe	3,322	67.62%	1,504	30.61%	51	1.04%	36	0.73%	1,818	37.00%	4,913
Montgomery	24,339	51.92%	19,683	41.99%	2,618	5.59%	235	0.50%	4,656	9.93%	46,875
Morgan	1,833	44.26%	2,136	51.58%	105	2.54%	67	1.62%	-303	-7.32%	4,141
Morrow	2,345	51.64%	2,062	45.41%	39	0.86%	95	2.09%	283	6.23%	4,541
Muskingum	6,328	42.75%	7,597	51.32%	676	4.57%	201	1.36%	-1,269	-8.57%	14,802
Noble	2,175	47.80%	2,290	50.33%	32	0.70%	53	1.16%	-115	-2.53%	4,550
Ottawa	3,347	64.44%	1,793	34.52%	46	0.89%	8	0.15%	1,554	29.92%	5,194
Paulding	2,313	45.64%	2,647	52.23%	85	1.68%	23	0.45%	-334	-6.59%	5,068
Perry	3,860	46.73%	3,953	47.85%	381	4.61%	67	0.81%	-93	-1.13%	8,261
Pickaway	3,820	58.66%	2,629	40.37%	21	0.32%	42	0.64%	1,191	18.29%	6,512
Pike	2,091	55.72%	1,616	43.06%	29	0.77%	17	0.45%	475	12.66%	3,753
Portage	4,269	55.56%	3,142	40.90%	215	2.80%	57	0.74%	1,127	14.67%	7,683
Preble	3,387	53.09%	2,881	45.16%	59	0.92%	53	0.83%	506	7.93%	6,380
Putnam	4,294	64.79%	2,243	33.84%	53	0.80%	38	0.57%	2,051	30.94%	6,628
Richland	6,985	56.87%	4,886	39.78%	343	2.79%	69	0.56%	2,099	17.09%	12,283
Ross	5,154	50.68%	4,857	47.76%	109	1.07%	50	0.49%	297	2.92%	10,170
Sandusky	5,264	58.25%	3,557	39.36%	132	1.46%	84	0.93%	1,707	18.89%	9,037
Scioto	4,808	40.71%	6,356	53.82%	521	4.41%	124	1.05%	-1,548	-13.11%	11,809
Seneca	6,451	57.80%	4,301	38.54%	320	2.87%	89	0.80%	2,150	19.26%	11,161
Shelby	3,801	60.32%	2,352	37.33%	110	1.75%	38	0.60%	1,449	23.00%	6,301
Stark	15,316	48.93%	14,159	45.23%	1,506	4.81%	322	1.03%	1,157	3.70%	31,303
Summit	19,343	59.45%	11,593	35.63%	1,260	3.87%	343	1.05%	7,750	23.82%	32,539
Trumbull	6,091	46.57%	6,167	47.15%	684	5.23%	138	1.06%	-76	-0.58%	13,080
Tuscarawas	7,608	54.84%	5,404	38.96%	806	5.81%	54	0.39%	2,204	15.89%	13,872
Union	2,747	45.73%	3,182	52.97%	47	0.78%	31	0.52%	-435	-7.24%	6,007
Van Wert	3,753	48.56%	3,802	49.19%	131	1.69%	43	0.56%	-49	-0.63%	7,729
Vinton	1,433	49.19%	1,420	48.75%	53	1.82%	7	0.24%	13	0.45%	2,913
Warren	2,937	44.22%	3,610	54.35%	60	0.90%	35	0.53%	-673	-10.13%	6,642
Washington	5,267	50.43%	4,745	45.43%	335	3.21%	97	0.93%	522	5.00%	10,444
Wayne	5,930	60.22%	3,676	37.33%	135	1.37%	106	1.08%	2,254	22.89%	9,847
Williams	3,552	51.68%	3,132	45.57%	131	1.91%	58	0.84%	420	6.11%	6,873
Wood	5,796	52.18%	5,034	45.32%	202	1.82%	76	0.68%	762	6.86%	11,108
Wyandot	3,250	60.50%	2,078	38.68%	33	0.61%	11	0.20%	1,172	21.82%	5,372
Totals	604,161	51.84%	514,753	44.17%	38,392	3.29%	8,080	0.69%	89,408	7.67%	1,165,386

== See also ==
- United States presidential elections in Ohio
