= 1852 United States presidential election in Ohio =

- November 2, 1852

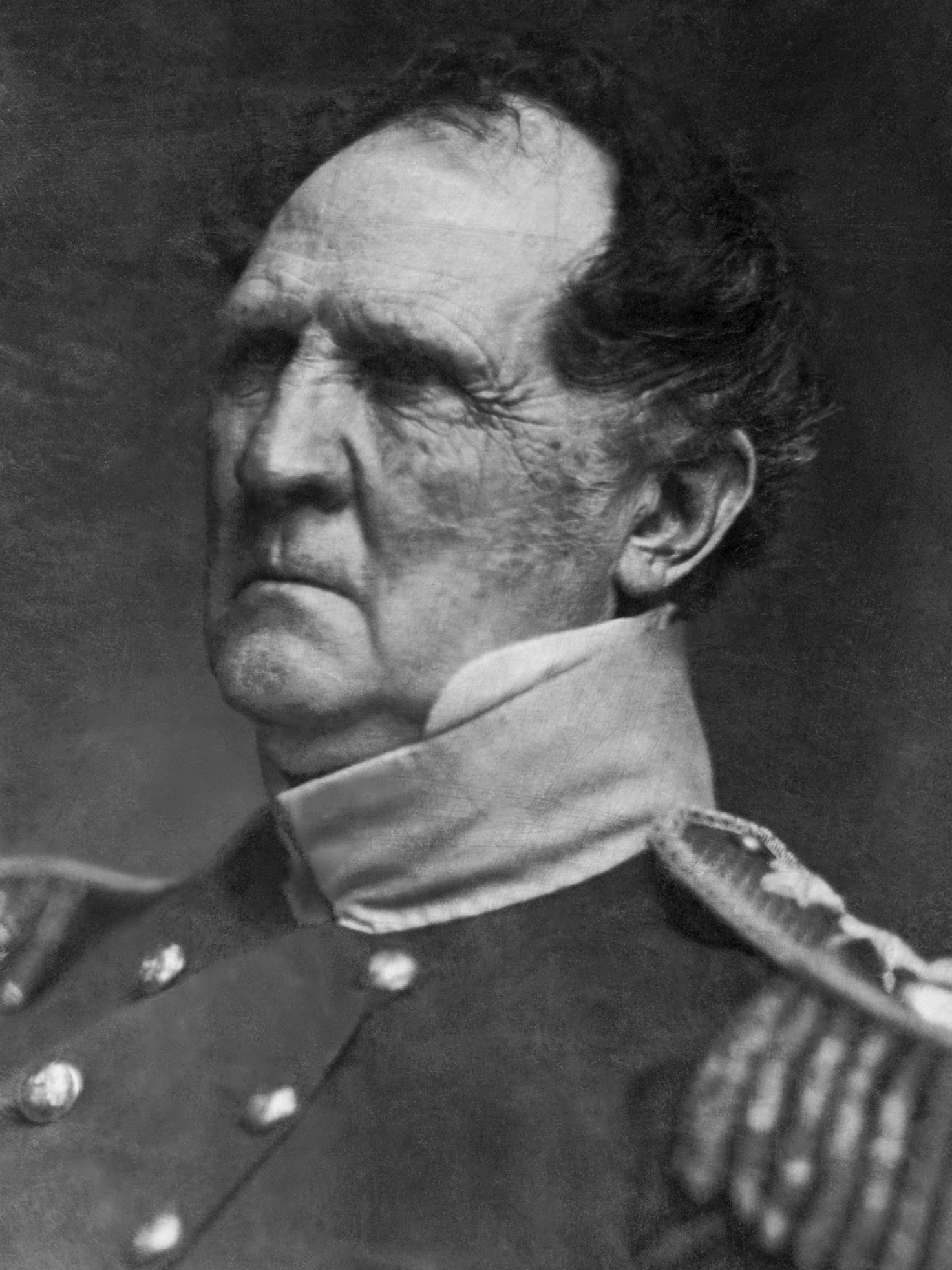

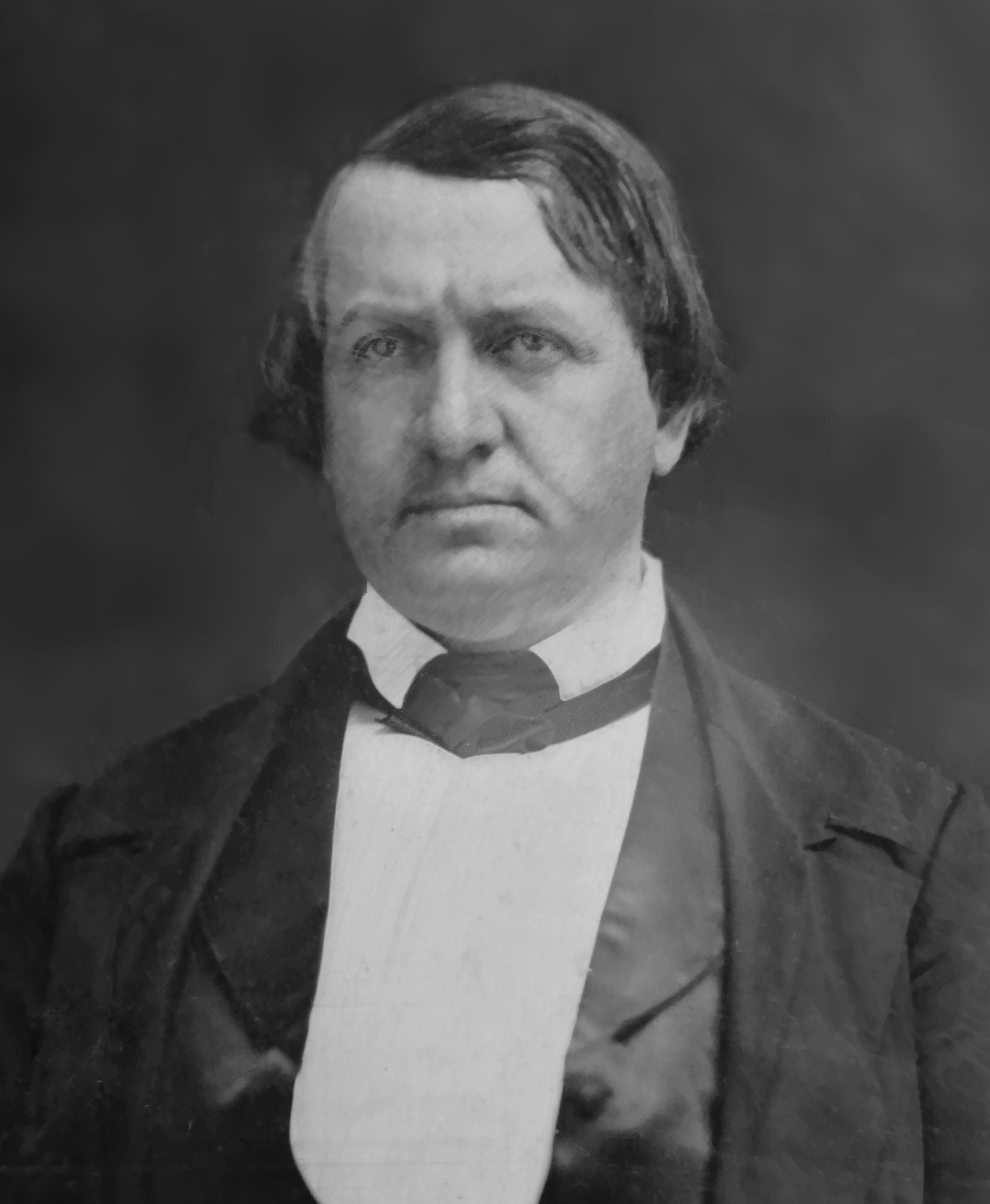
Nominee	Franklin Pierce	Winfield Scott	John P. Hale
Party	Democratic	Whig	Free Soil
Home state	New Hampshire	New Jersey	New Hampshire
Running mate	William R. King	William A. Graham	George W. Julian
Electoral vote	23	0	0
Popular vote	168,933	152,523	31,732
Percentage	47.83%	43.18%	8.98%
County results
Pierce
40–50%
50–60%
60–70%
70–80%
Scott
40–50%
50–60%
60–70%
Hale
40–50%
President before election
Millard Fillmore
Whig
Elected President
Franklin Pierce
Democratic

The 1852 United States presidential election in Ohio was held on November 2, 1852, as part of the 1852 United States presidential election. State voters chose 23 electors to the Electoral College, who voted for President and Vice President.

Ohio was narrowly won by the Democratic Party candidate, Franklin Pierce, who won the state with a plurality of 47.83 percent of the popular vote. The Whig Party candidate, Winfield Scott, garnered 43.18 percent of the popular vote, and Free Soil Party candidate John P. Hale gained 8.98 percent, a figure exceeded by a third-party candidate in Ohio only six times since. (Note: In 1912, both Theodore Roosevelt and Eugene V. Debs exceeded Hale’s share, as did Robert M. La Follette in 1924, George Wallace in 1968, and Ross Perot in both 1992 and 1996.)

Pierce would become the final Democrat to win Ohio until Woodrow Wilson won it in 1912.

== Results ==
1852 United States presidential election in Ohio
Party	Candidate	Votes	Percentage	Electoral votes
Democratic	Franklin Pierce	168,933	47.83%	23
Whig	Winfield Scott	152,523	43.18%	0
Free Soil	John P. Hale	31,732	8.98%	0
Totals		353,188	100.0%	23

=== By county ===
County	Franklin Pierce Democratic		Winfield Scott Whig		John P. Hale Free Soil		Margin		Total
County	#	%	#	%	#	%	#	%	Total
Adams	1,736	54.56%	1,213	38.12%	233	7.32%	523	16.44%	3,182
Allen	1,536	61.03%	958	38.06%	23	0.91%	578	22.97%	2,517
Ashland	2,434	59.38%	1,368	33.37%	297	7.25%	1,066	26.01%	4,099
Ashtabula	1,075	18.69%	2,174	37.80%	2,502	43.51%	-328	-5.71%	5,751
Athens	1,383	39.53%	1,750	50.01%	366	10.46%	-367	-10.48%	3,499
Auglaize	1,480	70.75%	588	28.11%	24	1.14%	892	42.64%	2,092
Belmont	2,694	45.40%	2,786	46.95%	454	7.65%	-92	-1.55%	5,934
Brown	2,460	53.99%	1,703	37.38%	393	8.63%	757	16.61%	4,556
Butler	3,579	60.55%	2,210	37.39%	122	2.06%	1,369	23.16%	5,911
Carroll	1,355	43.15%	1,543	49.14%	242	7.71%	-188	-5.99%	3,140
Champaign	1,687	43.40%	1,994	51.30%	206	5.30%	-307	-7.90%	3,887
Clark	1,374	32.57%	2,662	63.10%	183	4.33%	-1,288	-30.53%	4,219
Clermont	2,765	51.33%	2,213	41.08%	409	7.59%	552	10.25%	5,387
Clinton	1,063	33.33%	1,424	44.65%	702	22.02%	-361	-11.32%	3,189
Columbiana	2,911	47.40%	2,237	36.43%	993	16.17%	674	10.97%	6,141
Coshocton	2,618	57.05%	1,898	41.36%	73	1.59%	720	15.69%	4,589
Crawford	2,106	65.04%	1,074	33.17%	58	1.79%	1,032	31.87%	3,238
Cuyahoga	3,571	41.41%	2,945	34.15%	2,107	24.44%	626	7.26%	8,623
Darke	1,797	49.81%	1,719	47.64%	92	2.55%	78	2.17%	3,608
Defiance	895	60.11%	551	37.00%	43	2.89%	344	23.11%	1,489
Delaware	1,591	39.14%	2,083	51.24%	391	9.62%	-492	-12.10%	4,065
Erie	1,404	42.96%	1,589	48.62%	275	8.42%	-185	-5.66%	3,268
Fairfield	3,211	60.15%	2,117	39.66%	10	0.19%	1,094	20.49%	5,338
Fayette	893	39.17%	1,221	53.55%	166	7.28%	-328	-14.38%	2,280
Franklin	3,652	49.40%	3,498	47.32%	242	3.28%	154	2.08%	7,392
Fulton	727	52.49%	587	42.38%	71	5.13%	140	10.11%	1,385
Gallia	1,103	39.32%	1,567	55.86%	135	4.82%	-464	-16.54%	2,805
Geauga	664	20.43%	1,147	35.29%	1,439	44.28%	-292	-8.99%	3,250
Greene	1,490	33.71%	2,430	54.98%	500	11.31%	-940	-21.27%	4,420
Guernsey	1,809	42.53%	1,941	45.64%	503	11.83%	-132	-3.11%	4,253
Hamilton	13,207	57.06%	9,253	39.98%	684	2.96%	3,954	17.08%	23,144
Hancock	1,617	59.27%	1,076	39.44%	35	1.29%	541	19.83%	2,728
Hardin	847	46.98%	882	48.92%	74	4.10%	-35	-1.94%	1,803
Harrison	1,462	40.53%	1,723	47.77%	422	11.70%	-261	-7.24%	3,607
Henry	536	61.26%	325	37.14%	14	1.60%	211	24.12%	875
Highland	2,299	50.39%	1,982	43.45%	281	6.16%	317	6.94%	4,562
Hocking	1,852	67.64%	865	31.59%	21	0.77%	987	36.05%	2,738
Holmes	2,100	65.46%	1,066	33.23%	42	1.31%	1,034	32.23%	3,208
Huron	1,819	36.72%	2,242	45.26%	893	18.02%	-423	-8.54%	4,954
Jackson	1,093	50.11%	1,069	49.01%	19	0.88%	24	1.10%	2,181
Jefferson	2,169	48.13%	1,995	44.26%	343	7.61%	174	3.87%	4,507
Knox	2,692	56.18%	1,874	39.11%	226	4.71%	818	17.07%	4,792
Lake	670	23.70%	1,046	37.00%	1,111	39.30%	-65	-2.30%	2,827
Lawrence	981	42.75%	1,299	56.60%	15	0.65%	-318	-13.85%	2,295
Licking	3,569	51.50%	2,779	40.10%	582	8.40%	790	11.40%	6,930
Logan	1,361	37.08%	2,118	57.71%	191	5.21%	-757	-20.63%	3,670
Lorain	1,553	33.31%	1,332	28.57%	1,777	38.12%	-224	-4.81%	4,662
Lucas	1,271	48.18%	1,238	46.93%	129	4.89%	33	1.25%	2,638
Madison	655	30.95%	1,400	66.16%	61	2.89%	-745	-35.21%	2,116
Mahoning	1,873	48.51%	955	24.74%	1,033	26.75%	840	21.76%	3,861
Marion	1,270	56.12%	914	40.39%	79	3.49%	356	15.73%	2,263
Medina	1,754	40.41%	1,579	36.37%	1,008	23.22%	175	4.04%	4,341
Meigs	1,399	42.80%	1,573	48.12%	297	9.08%	-174	-5.32%	3,269
Mercer	829	61.87%	500	37.31%	11	0.82%	329	24.56%	1,340
Miami	2,004	40.14%	2,754	55.16%	235	4.70%	-750	-15.02%	4,993
Monroe	2,422	67.30%	997	27.70%	180	5.00%	1,425	39.60%	3,599
Montgomery	3,744	47.96%	3,886	49.78%	177	2.26%	-142	-1.82%	7,807
Morgan	1,708	42.57%	2,084	51.94%	220	5.49%	-376	-9.37%	4,012
Morrow	1,710	49.04%	1,029	29.51%	748	21.45%	681	19.53%	3,487
Muskingum	3,500	44.08%	4,228	53.24%	213	2.68%	-728	-9.16%	7,941
Noble	1,487	52.97%	885	31.53%	435	15.50%	602	21.44%	2,807
Ottawa	400	59.17%	274	40.53%	2	0.30%	126	18.64%	676
Paulding	347	73.36%	121	25.58%	5	1.06%	226	47.78%	473
Perry	2,246	60.15%	1,471	39.39%	17	0.46%	775	20.76%	3,734
Pickaway	2,041	48.01%	2,175	51.16%	35	0.83%	-134	-3.15%	4,251
Pike	1,029	52.18%	927	47.01%	16	0.81%	102	5.17%	1,972
Portage	2,007	41.35%	1,551	31.95%	1,296	26.70%	456	9.40%	4,854
Preble	1,633	40.00%	2,253	55.18%	197	4.82%	-620	-15.18%	4,083
Putnam	890	63.03%	461	32.65%	61	4.32%	429	30.38%	1,412
Richland	3,234	58.00%	2,133	38.25%	209	3.75%	1,101	19.75%	5,576
Ross	2,465	42.98%	3,091	53.90%	179	3.12%	-626	-10.92%	5,735
Sandusky	1,619	58.43%	1,064	38.40%	88	3.17%	555	20.03%	2,771
Scioto	1,424	43.72%	1,804	55.39%	29	0.89%	-380	-11.67%	3,257
Seneca	2,809	57.34%	1,972	40.25%	118	2.41%	837	17.09%	4,899
Shelby	1,309	52.15%	1,147	45.70%	54	2.15%	162	6.45%	2,510
Stark	3,634	54.00%	2,740	40.71%	356	5.29%	894	13.29%	6,730
Summit	1,965	39.61%	2,336	47.09%	660	13.30%	-371	-7.48%	4,961
Trumbull	2,039	35.49%	1,968	34.25%	1,739	30.25%	71	1.24%	5,746
Tuscarawas	2,685	49.21%	2,659	48.74%	112	2.05%	26	0.47%	5,456
Union	943	38.54%	1,249	51.04%	255	10.42%	-306	-12.50%	2,447
Van Wert	737	63.26%	422	36.22%	6	0.52%	315	27.04%	1,165
Vinton	912	51.21%	774	43.46%	95	5.33%	138	7.75%	1,781
Warren	1,919	38.64%	2,823	56.85%	224	4.51%	-904	-18.21%	4,966
Washington	2,139	44.19%	2,369	48.95%	332	6.86%	-230	-4.76%	4,840
Wayne	3,143	57.35%	2,288	41.75%	49	0.90%	855	15.60%	5,480
Williams	832	54.10%	546	35.50%	160	10.40%	286	18.60%	1,538
Wood	986	53.67%	831	45.24%	20	1.09%	155	8.43%	1,837
Wyandot	1,290	56.36%	990	43.25%	9	0.39%	300	13.11%	2,289
Totals	168,933	47.83%	152,523	43.18%	31,732	8.99%	16,410	4.65%	353,188

== See also ==
- United States presidential elections in Ohio
