= 1856 United States presidential election in Ohio =

- November 4, 1856
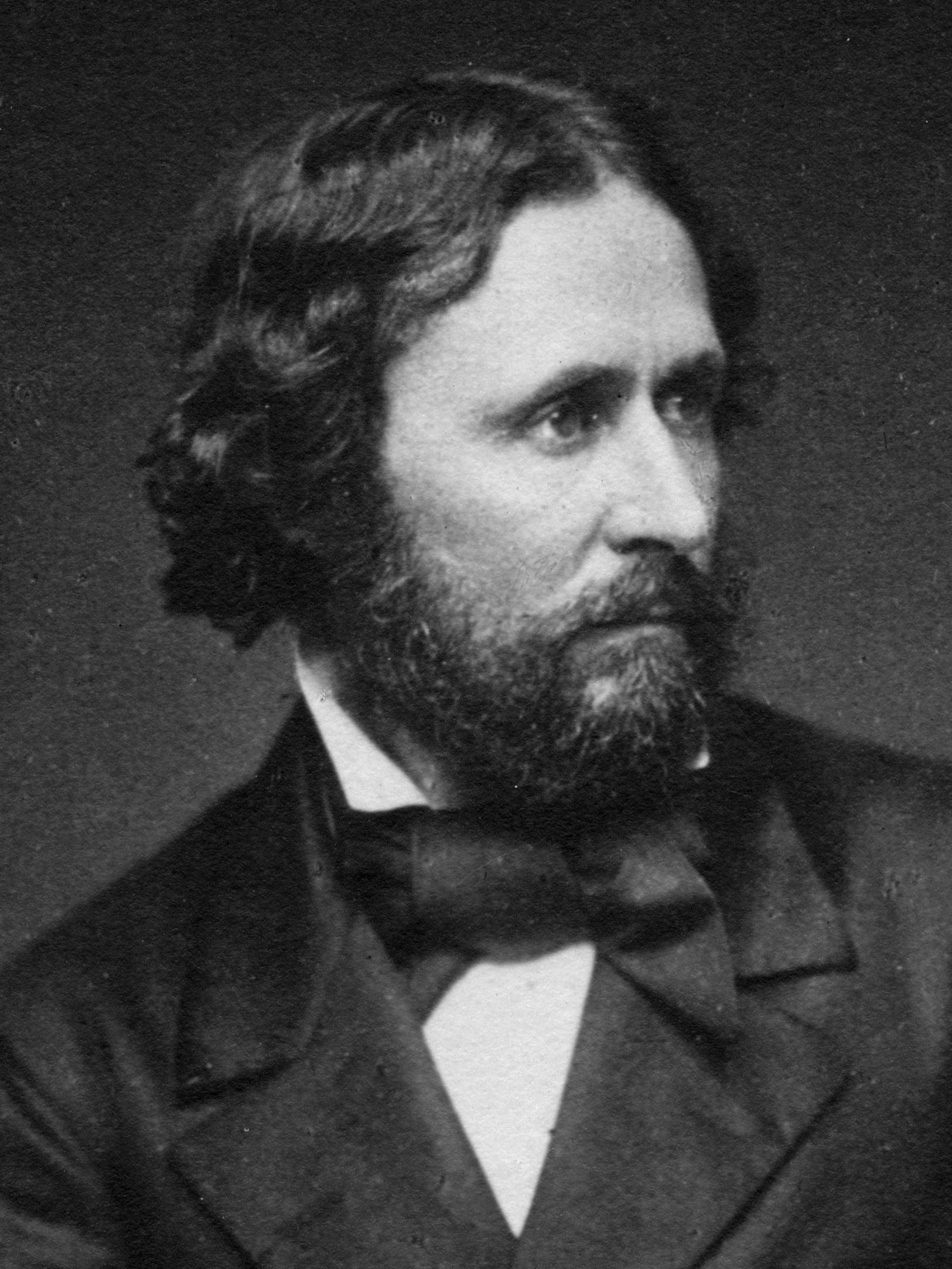

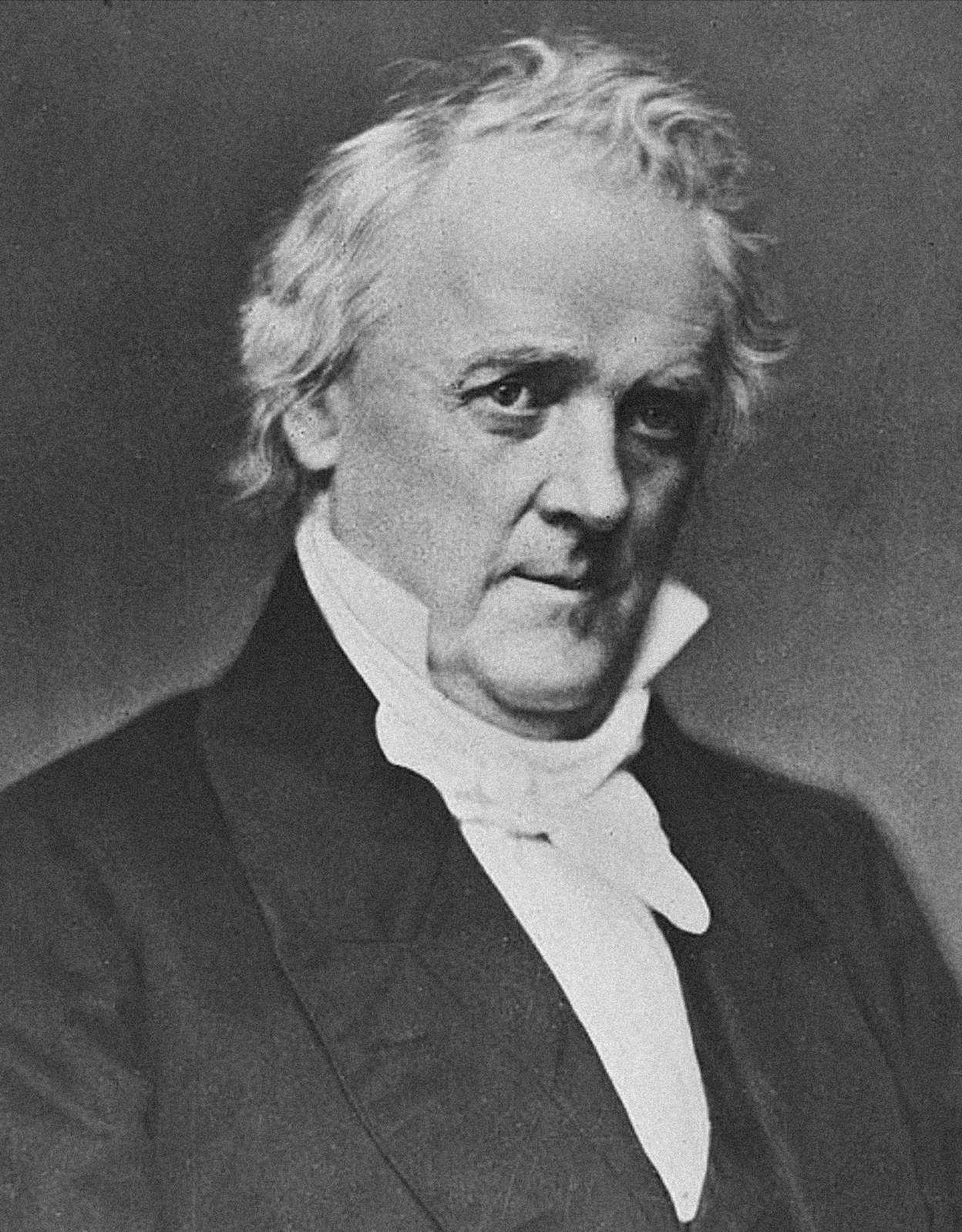

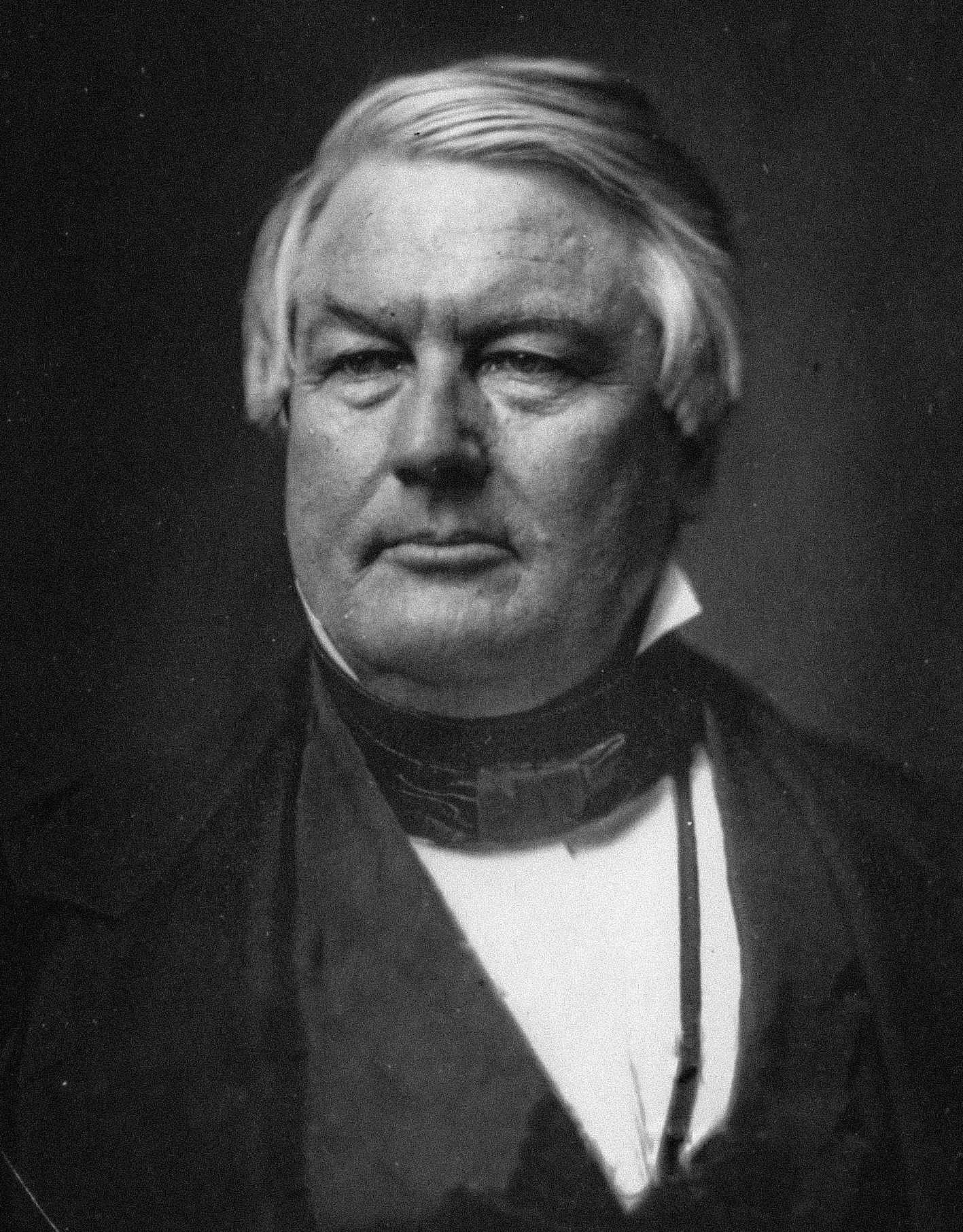
Nominee	John C. Frémont	James Buchanan	Millard Fillmore
Party	Republican	Democratic	Know Nothing
Home state	California	Pennsylvania	New York
Running mate	William L. Dayton	John C. Breckinridge	Andrew Jackson Donelson
Electoral vote	23	0	0
Popular vote	187,497	170,874	28,126
Percentage	48.51%	44.21%	7.28%
County results
Fremont
40–50%
50–60%
60–70%
70–80%
80–90%
Buchanan
40–50%
50–60%
60–70%
President before election
Franklin Pierce
Democratic
Elected President
James Buchanan
Democratic

The 1856 United States presidential election in Ohio took place on November 4, 1856, as part of the 1856 United States presidential election. Voters chose 23 representatives, or electors to the Electoral College, who voted for president and vice president.

Ohio was won by California Senator John C. Frémont, running with New Jersey Senator William L. Dayton, with 48.51% of the popular vote, against Senator James Buchanan (D–Pennsylvania), running with Representative and future presidential candidate in the 1860 presidential election John C. Breckinridge, with 44.21% of the popular vote and the 13th president of the United States Millard Fillmore (A–New York), running with the 2nd United States Ambassador to Germany Andrew Jackson Donelson, with 7.28% of the popular vote.

This election began a streak of 14 consecutive victories for the Republican party; Indeed, due to the creation of the party only two years prior in 1854, no Republican Presidential nominee would lose the state until William Howard Taft in 1912. However, this streak was tenuous, and only twice (in 1864 and 1904) did the Republican margin of victory exceed ten percentage points. Indeed, in 1892 the margin was so tight that one Cleveland elector received more votes than the lowest Harrison elector. The nomination of Ohio politicians Rutherford B. Hayes, James A. Garfield, William McKinley, and William Howard Taft certainly helped maintain the light but steady grip their party held on the state. Indeed, even when the nominee was not an Ohio politician, they were often a resident of a nearby state like Indiana (Harrison) or Illinois (Lincoln), or, in the case of Grant, a resident of Illinois who had been born and raised in Ohio. Thus, during the 60-year hegemony of the Republican party in Ohio, only two nominees – James G. Blaine in 1884 and Theodore Roosevelt in 1904 – had no connection whatsoever to the lower Midwest.

== Results ==
1856 United States presidential election in Ohio
Party	Candidate	Votes	%
Republican	John C. Frémont	187,497	48.51%
Democratic	James Buchanan	170,874	44.21%
Know Nothing	Millard Fillmore	28,126	7.28%
Total votes		386,497	100.00%

=== Results by county ===
County	John C. Fremont Republican		James Buchanan Democratic		Millard Fillmore Know Nothing		Margin		Total votes cast
County	#	%	#	%	#	%	#	%	Total votes cast
Adams	1,407	40.49%	1,790	51.51%	278	8.00%	-383	-11.02%	3,475
Allen	1,415	46.90%	1,508	49.98%	94	3.12%	-93	-3.08%	3,017
Ashland	1,912	47.33%	2,089	51.71%	39	0.96%	-177	-4.38%	4,040
Ashtabula	5,108	80.63%	975	15.39%	252	3.98%	4,133	65.24%	6,335
Athens	2,299	60.45%	1,350	35.50%	154	4.05%	949	24.95%	3,803
Auglaize	912	35.02%	1,604	61.60%	88	3.38%	-692	-26.58%	2,604
Belmont	1,817	28.48%	2,810	44.04%	1,753	27.48%	-993	-15.56%	6,380
Brown	1,785	36.33%	2,700	54.96%	428	8.71%	-915	-18.63%	4,913
Butler	2,301	37.68%	3,509	57.47%	296	4.85%	-1,208	-19.79%	6,106
Carroll	1,750	56.60%	1,255	40.59%	87	2.81%	495	16.01%	3,092
Champaign	1,995	49.55%	1,711	42.50%	320	7.95%	284	7.05%	4,026
Clark	2,641	60.74%	1,539	35.40%	168	3.86%	1,102	25.34%	4,348
Clermont	2,188	38.32%	2,741	48.00%	781	13.68%	-553	-9.68%	5,710
Clinton	2,117	60.02%	1,170	33.17%	240	6.81%	947	26.85%	3,527
Columbiana	3,516	57.55%	2,497	40.87%	96	1.58%	1,019	16.68%	6,109
Coshocton	2,162	48.06%	2,281	50.70%	56	1.24%	-119	-2.64%	4,499
Crawford	1,685	43.53%	2,154	55.64%	32	0.83%	-469	-12.11%	3,871
Cuyahoga	6,360	57.29%	4,446	40.05%	296	2.66%	1,914	17.24%	11,102
Darke	2,086	48.70%	1,988	46.42%	209	4.88%	98	2.28%	4,283
Defiance	821	46.81%	895	51.03%	38	2.16%	-74	-4.22%	1,754
Delaware	2,367	55.75%	1,649	38.84%	230	5.41%	718	16.91%	4,246
Erie	2,258	60.86%	1,377	37.12%	75	2.02%	881	23.74%	3,710
Fairfield	1,700	30.12%	3,233	57.28%	711	12.60%	-1,533	-27.16%	5,644
Fayette	1,209	49.11%	880	35.74%	373	15.15%	329	13.37%	2,462
Franklin	3,488	44.42%	3,791	48.27%	574	7.31%	-303	-3.85%	7,853
Fulton	1,098	56.77%	772	39.92%	64	3.31%	326	16.85%	1,934
Gallia	610	19.32%	1,341	42.48%	1,206	38.20%	135 (Note: In this county where Fremont ran third behind both Buchanan and Fillmore, margin given is Buchanan vote minus Fillmore vote and percentage margin Buchanan percentage minus Fillmore percentage.)	-23.16%	3,157
Geauga	2,694	80.97%	575	17.28%	58	1.75%	2,119	63.69%	3,327
Greene	3,032	64.36%	1,465	31.10%	214	4.54%	1,567	33.26%	4,711
Guernsey	2,392	52.76%	1,932	42.61%	210	4.63%	460	10.15%	4,534
Hamilton	9,345	33.28%	13,051	46.48%	5,680	20.24%	-3,706	-13.20%	28,076
Hancock	1,773	47.23%	1,944	51.78%	37	0.99%	-171	-4.55%	3,754
Hardin	1,091	53.09%	882	42.92%	82	3.99%	209	10.17%	2,055
Harrison	2,060	56.55%	1,473	40.43%	110	3.02%	587	16.12%	3,643
Henry	587	46.44%	655	51.82%	22	1.74%	-68	-5.38%	1,264
Highland	1,810	37.37%	2,140	44.18%	894	18.45%	-330	-6.81%	4,844
Hocking	1,092	41.04%	1,454	54.64%	115	4.32%	-362	-13.60%	2,661
Holmes	1,285	37.87%	2,103	61.98%	5	0.15%	-818	-24.11%	3,393
Huron	3,468	66.30%	1,709	32.67%	54	1.03%	1,759	33.63%	5,231
Jackson	938	34.27%	1,383	50.53%	416	15.20%	-445	-16.26%	3,269
Jefferson	2,424	51.86%	1,991	42.60%	259	5.54%	433	9.26%	4,674
Knox	2,735	51.64%	2,437	46.02%	124	2.34%	298	5.62%	5,296
Lake	2,371	78.04%	628	20.67%	39	1.29%	1,743	57.37%	3,038
Lawrence	743	26.58%	1,150	41.14%	902	32.28%	248	8.86%	2,795
Licking	3,027	44.42%	3,371	49.46%	417	6.12%	-344	-5.04%	6,815
Logan	2,093	56.75%	1,328	36.01%	267	7.24%	765	20.74%	3,688
Lorain	3,604	70.97%	1,420	27.96%	54	1.07%	2,184	43.01%	5,078
Lucas	1,639	41.07%	1,866	46.76%	486	12.17%	-227	-5.69%	3,991
Madison	997	46.85%	656	30.83%	475	22.32%	341	16.02%	2,128
Mahoning	2,323	54.16%	1,937	45.16%	29	0.68%	386	9.00%	4,289
Marion	1,367	51.66%	1,275	48.19%	4	0.15%	92	3.47%	2,646
Medina	2,635	62.22%	1,572	37.12%	28	0.66%	1,063	25.10%	4,235
Meigs	1,998	50.65%	1,603	40.63%	344	8.72%	395	10.02%	3,996
Mercer	629	33.07%	1,159	60.94%	114	5.99%	-530	-27.87%	1,902
Miami	3,171	59.63%	1,988	37.38%	159	2.99%	1,183	22.25%	5,318
Monroe	1,016	23.96%	2,812	66.31%	413	9.73%	-1,796	-42.35%	4,672
Montgomery	4,038	46.34%	4,285	49.17%	391	4.49%	-247	-2.83%	8,714
Morgan	2,125	53.19%	1,669	41.78%	201	5.03%	456	11.41%	3,995
Morrow	2,031	53.46%	1,667	43.88%	101	2.66%	364	9.58%	3,799
Muskingum	3,172	41.44%	3,391	44.30%	1,092	14.26%	-219	-2.86%	7,655
Noble	1,603	51.81%	1,337	43.21%	154	4.98%	266	8.60%	3,094
Ottawa	454	48.71%	477	51.18%	1	0.11%	-23	-2.47%	932
Paulding	497	73.96%	170	25.30%	5	0.74%	327	48.66%	672
Perry	1,385	37.19%	1,847	49.60%	492	13.21%	-462	-12.41%	3,724
Pickaway	1,724	41.32%	2,066	49.52%	382	9.16%	-342	-8.20%	4,172
Pike	523	25.23%	1,175	56.68%	375	18.09%	-652	-31.45%	2,073
Portage	2,983	58.94%	2,072	40.94%	6	0.12%	911	18.00%	5,061
Preble	2,249	55.08%	1,561	38.23%	273	6.69%	688	16.85%	4,083
Putnam	790	41.36%	1,116	58.43%	4	0.21%	-326	-17.07%	1,910
Richland	2,726	47.93%	2,909	51.14%	53	0.93%	-183	-3.21%	5,688
Ross	2,436	42.69%	2,681	46.99%	589	10.32%	-245	-4.30%	5,706
Sandusky	1,548	48.50%	1,599	50.09%	45	1.41%	-51	-1.59%	3,192
Scioto	546	15.60%	1,634	46.67%	1,321	37.73%	313	8.94%	3,501
Seneca	2,565	48.64%	2,605	49.40%	103	1.96%	-40	-0.76%	5,273
Shelby	1,356	46.30%	1,446	49.37%	127	4.33%	-90	-3.07%	2,929
Stark	3,770	50.73%	3,633	48.88%	29	0.39%	137	1.85%	7,432
Summit	3,185	63.64%	1,746	34.89%	74	1.47%	1,439	28.75%	5,005
Trumbull	4,049	67.63%	1,920	32.07%	18	0.30%	2,129	35.56%	5,987
Tuscarawas	3,007	52.93%	2,656	46.75%	18	0.32%	351	6.18%	5,681
Union	1,431	52.06%	1,055	38.38%	263	9.56%	376	13.68%	2,749
Van Wert	758	48.01%	789	49.97%	32	2.02%	-31	-1.96%	1,579
Vinton	932	43.21%	1,174	54.43%	51	2.36%	-242	-11.22%	2,157
Warren	2,688	55.91%	1,776	36.94%	344	7.15%	912	18.97%	4,808
Washington	2,783	52.36%	2,251	42.35%	281	5.29%	532	10.01%	5,315
Wayne	2,904	49.48%	2,918	49.72%	47	0.80%	-14	-0.24%	5,869
Williams	1,327	55.34%	1,022	42.62%	49	2.04%	305	12.72%	2,398
Wood	1,319	55.03%	935	39.01%	143	5.96%	384	16.02%	2,397
Wyandot	1,247	47.36%	1,278	48.54%	108	4.10%	-31	-1.18%	2,633
Totals	187,497	48.51%	170,874	44.21%	28,126	7.28%	16,623	4.30%	386,497

== See also ==
- United States presidential elections in Ohio
