= 1848 United States presidential election in Ohio =

- November 7, 1848
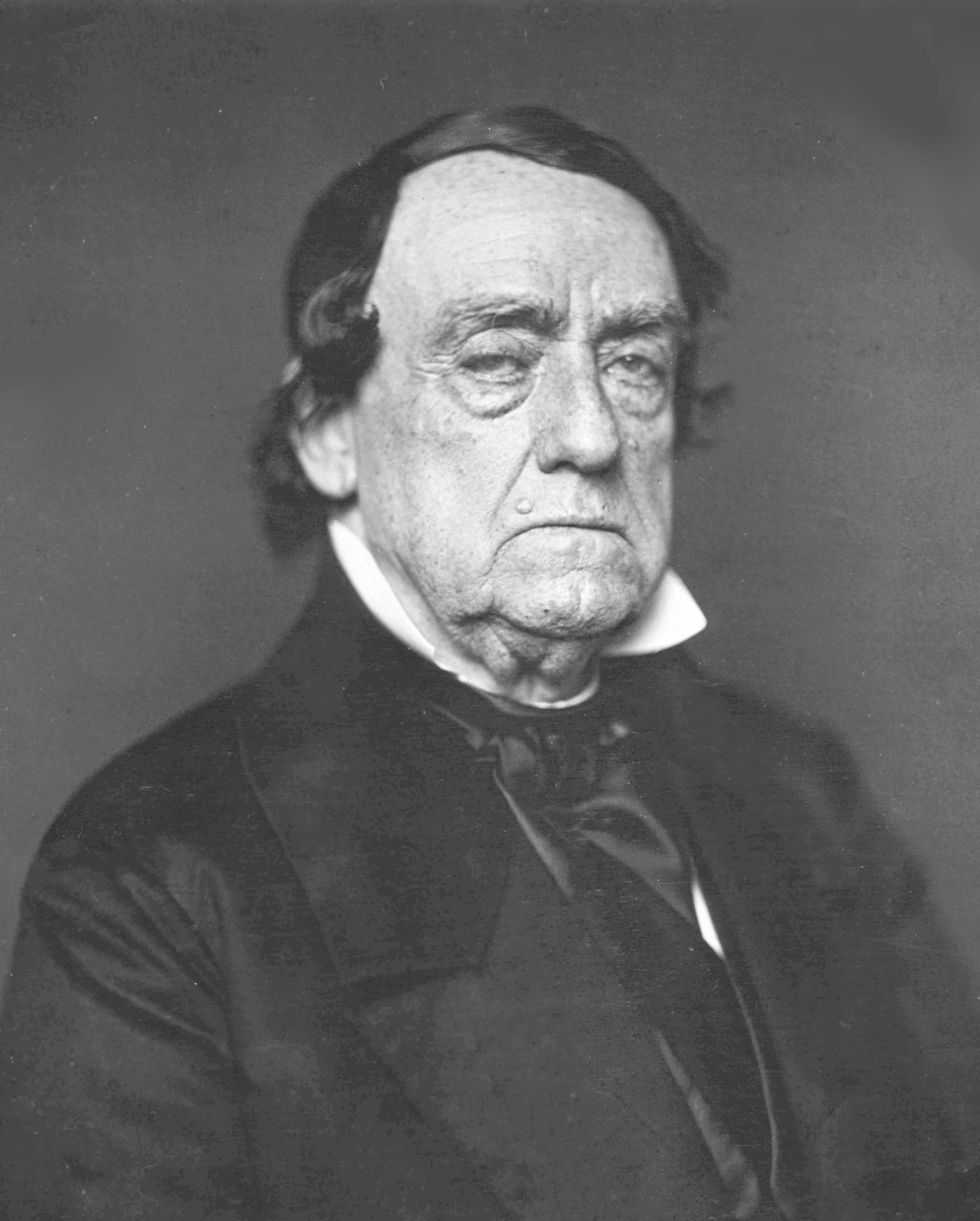

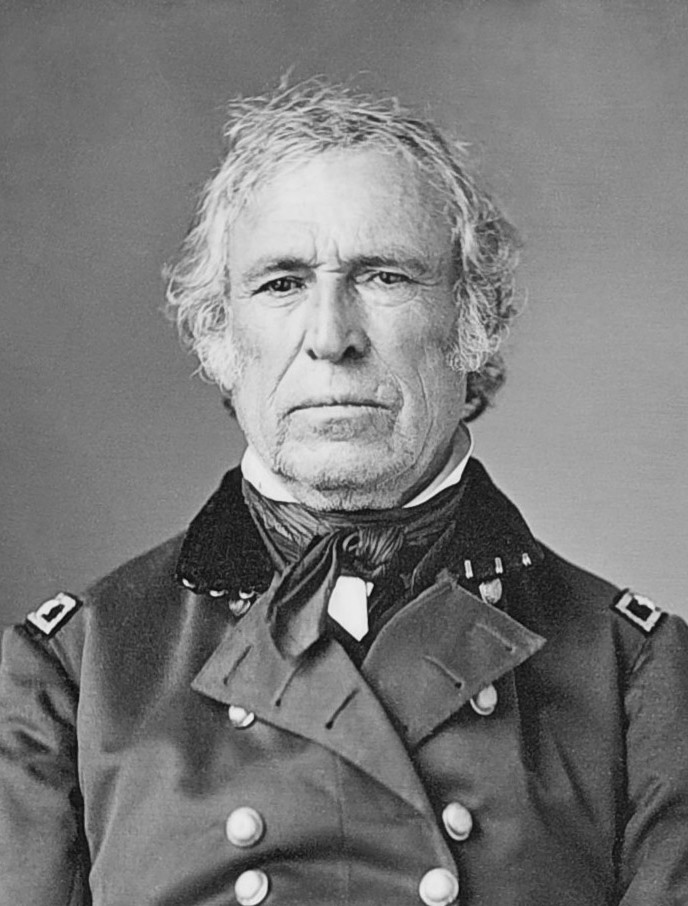

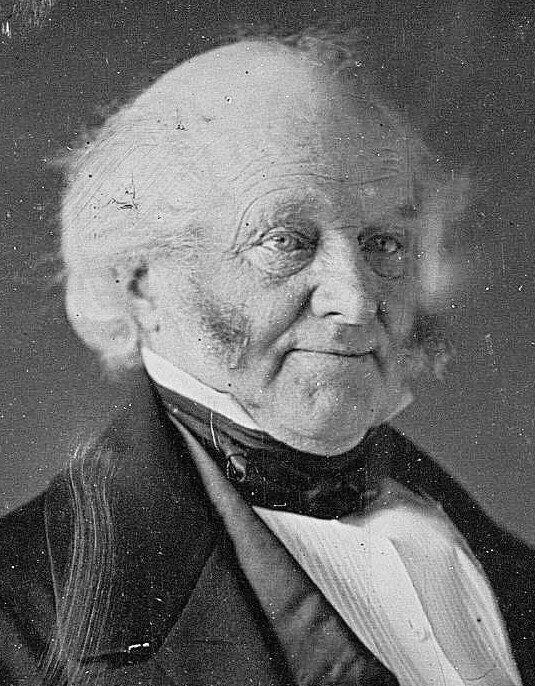
Nominee	Lewis Cass	Zachary Taylor	Martin Van Buren
Party	Democratic	Whig	Free Soil
Home state	Michigan	Louisiana	New York
Running mate	William O. Butler	Millard Fillmore	Charles Francis Adams Sr.
Electoral vote	23	0	0
Popular vote	154,773	138,359	35,347
Percentage	47.12%	42.12%	10.76%
County results
Cass
40–50%
50–60%
60–70%
70–80%
Taylor
30–40%
40–50%
50–60%
60–70%
Van Buren
30–40%
40–50%
50–60%
President before election
James K. Polk
Democratic
Elected President
Zachary Taylor
Whig

The 1848 United States presidential election in Ohio was held on November 7, 1848, as part of the 1848 United States presidential election. State voters chose twenty-three electors to the Electoral College, who voted for President and Vice President.

Ohio voted for the Democratic Party candidate, Lewis Cass, who won the state with a plurality of 47.12% of the popular vote. The Whig Party candidate, Zachary Taylor, garnered 42.12% of the popular vote. This is the only election where the Democratic candidate won Ohio but lost the general election, as well as the most recent election where Ohio voted for a losing presidential candidate in consecutive elections. This was the only state in this cycle to be flipped by Senator Cass.

== Results ==
1848 United States presidential election in Ohio
Party	Candidate	Votes	Percentage	Electoral votes
Democratic	Lewis Cass	154,773	47.12%	23
Whig	Zachary Taylor	138,359	42.12%	0
Free Soil	Martin Van Buren	35,347	10.76%	0
Totals		328,479	100.0%	23

== See also ==
- United States presidential elections in Ohio
