= 1832 United States presidential election in Ohio =

- November 2 – December 5, 1832
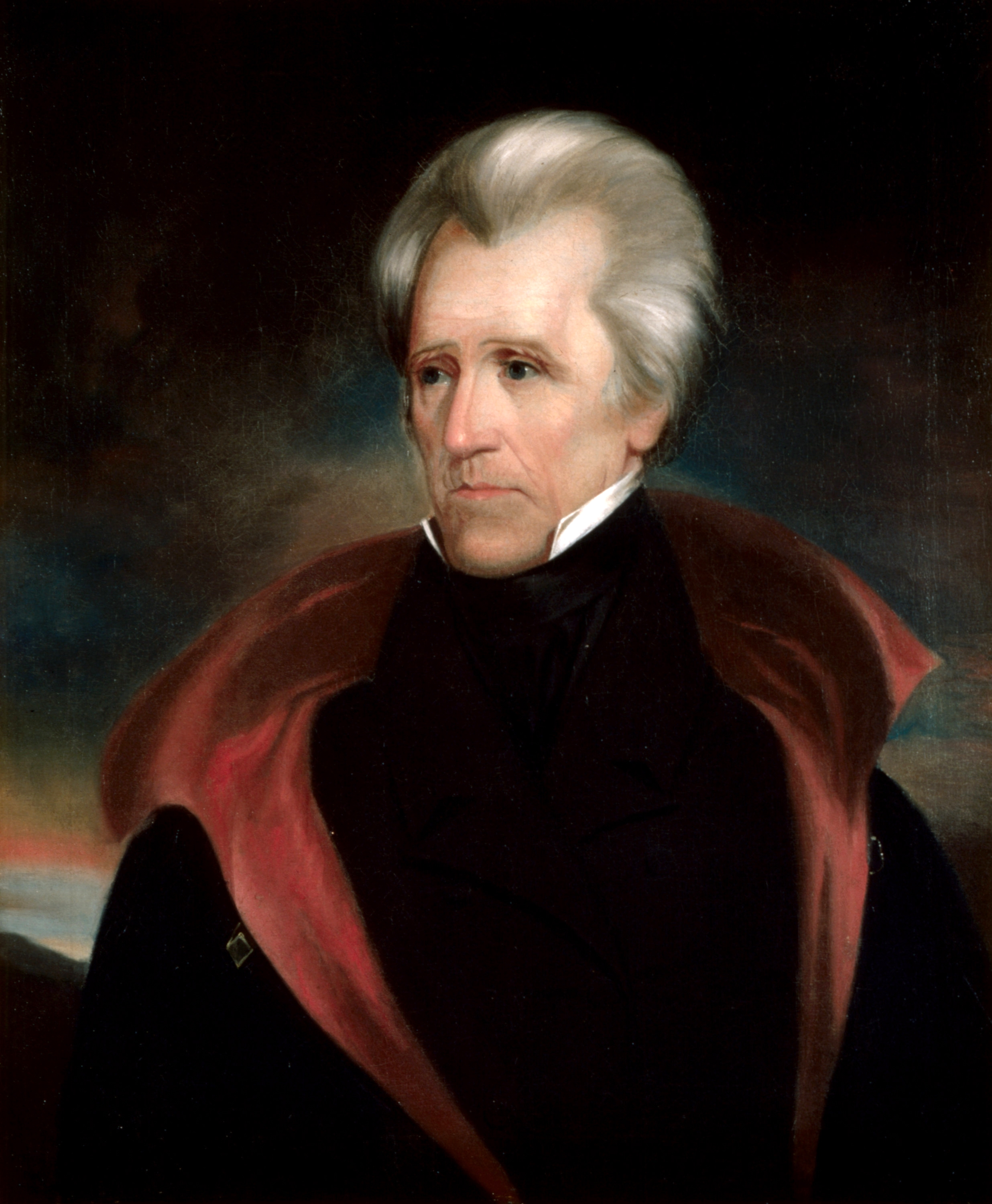

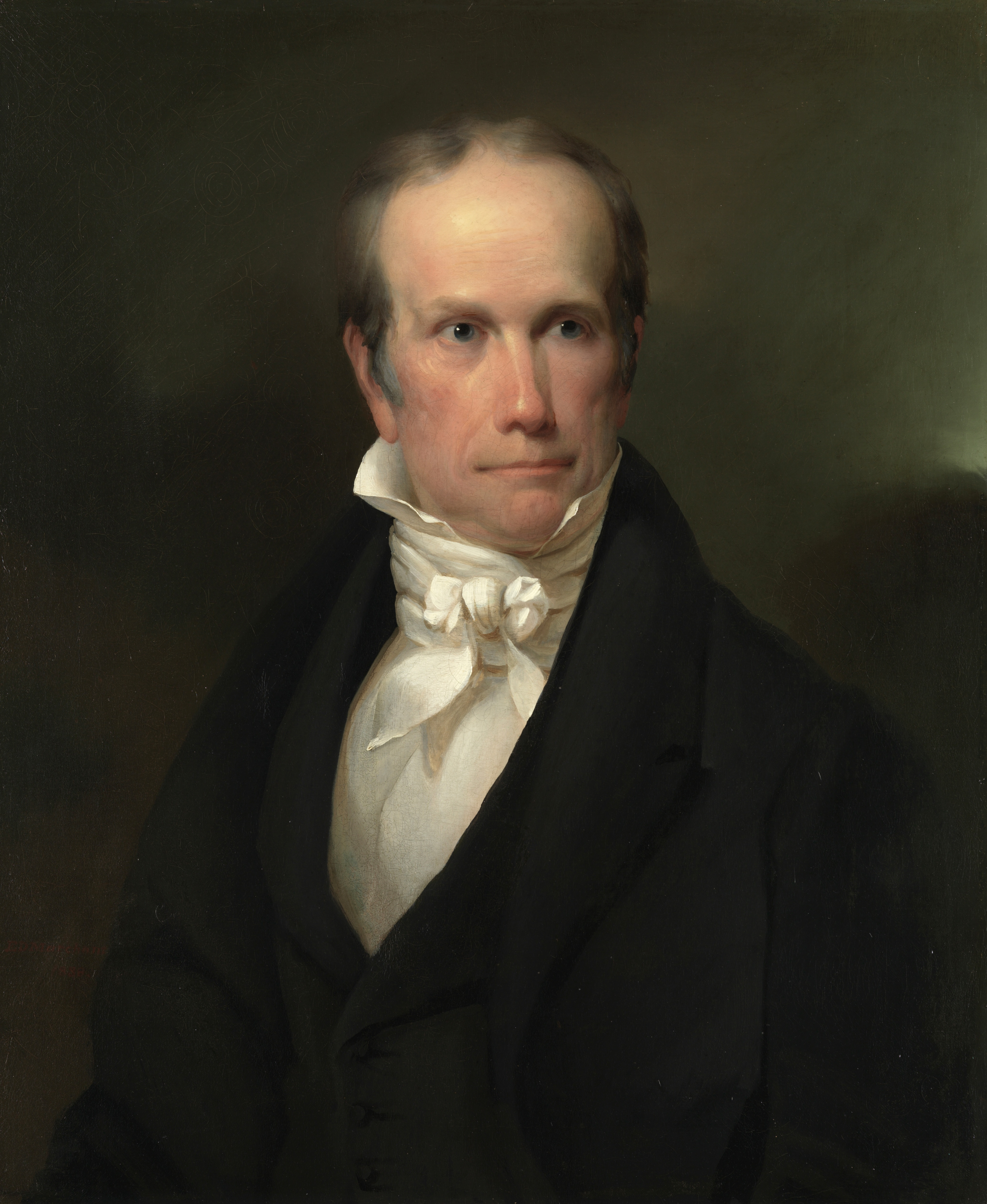
Nominee	Andrew Jackson	Henry Clay
Party	Democratic	National Republican
Alliance		Anti-Masonic
Home state	Tennessee	Kentucky
Running mate	Martin Van Buren	John Sergeant
Electoral vote	21	0
Popular vote	81,246	76,539
Percentage	51.33%	48.35%
County results
Jackson
50–60%
60–70%
70–80%
80–90%
Clay
50–60%
60–70%
70–80%
No Votes
No data
President before election
Andrew Jackson
Democratic
Elected President
Andrew Jackson
Democratic

The 1832 United States presidential election in Ohio took place between November 2 and December 5, 1832, as part of the 1832 United States presidential election. Voters chose 21 representatives, or electors to the Electoral College, who voted for President and Vice President.

Andrew Jackson was the incumbent president running for re-election on the Democratic ticket. Following the result of the 1828 election, the Adams Party split into competing factions. The Anti-Masonic Party drew support from New Englanders in the Western Reserve, while the National Republicans dominated the Anti-Jacksonian opposition in the rest of the state. The Anti-Masons were the first to hold a national convention and nominated former United States Attorney General William Wirt for president. They hoped the selection of Wirt, who had served in the John Quincy Adams Administration, could unite all Anti-Jacksonians under a single banner, but the National Republican convention spurned the Anti-Masons and nominated their own candidate, Senator Henry Clay of Kentucky. Fearing a split in the opposition vote could throw the election to Jackson, opposition leaders in Ohio agreed to support a fusion ticket of electors jointly nominated by the two parties who were pledged to vote for whichever candidate stood the best chance to defeat Jackson. While the plan succeeded in nearly uniting Ohio's Anti-Jacksonians, Jackson carried Ohio by a margin of 3 percent. This would be the last time a Democrat carried a majority of the vote in Ohio until 1916.

== Results ==
1832 United States presidential election in Ohio
Party	Candidate	Votes	Percentage	Electoral votes
Democratic	Andrew Jackson (incumbent)	81,246	51.33%	21
National Republican	Henry Clay	76,539	48.35%	0
Anti-Masonic	William Wirt	509	0.32%	0
Totals		158,294	100.0%	21

== See also ==
- United States presidential elections in Ohio
