= 1912 United States presidential election in Ohio =

- November 5, 1912

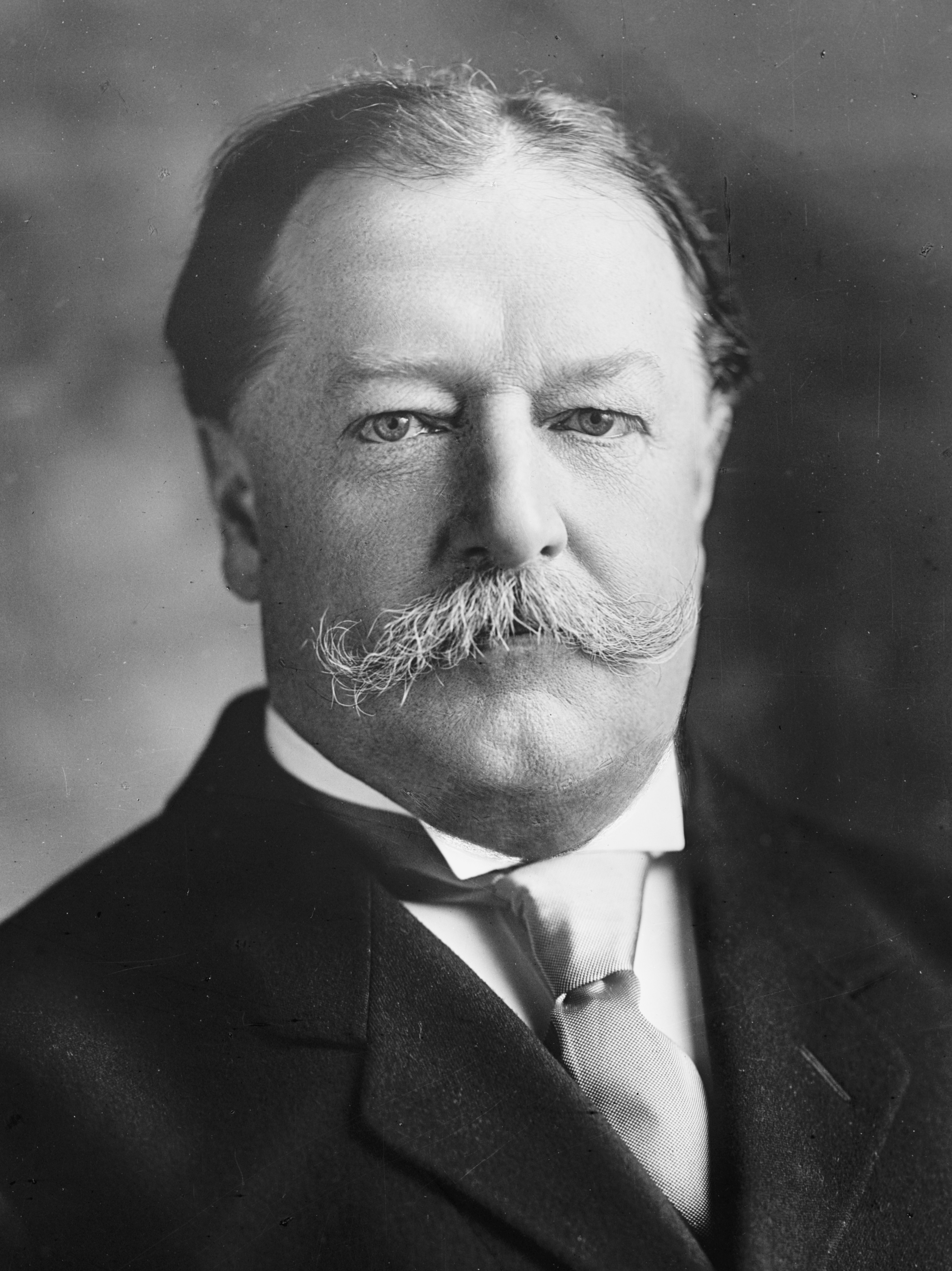

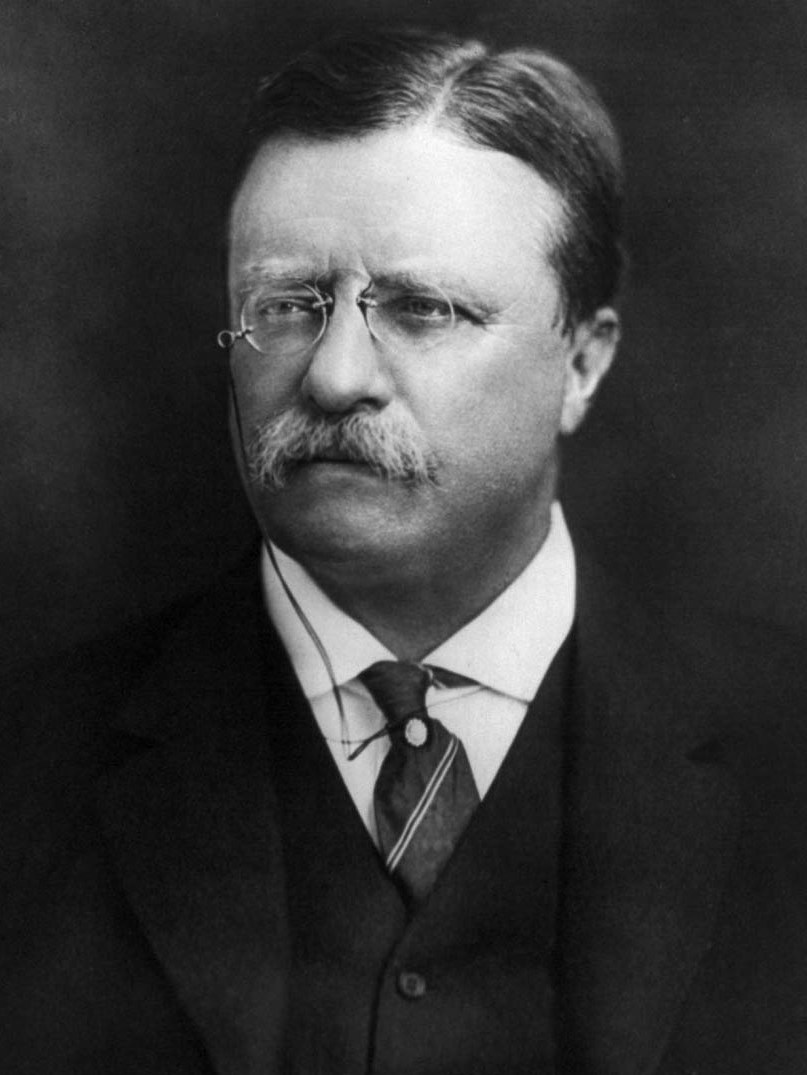

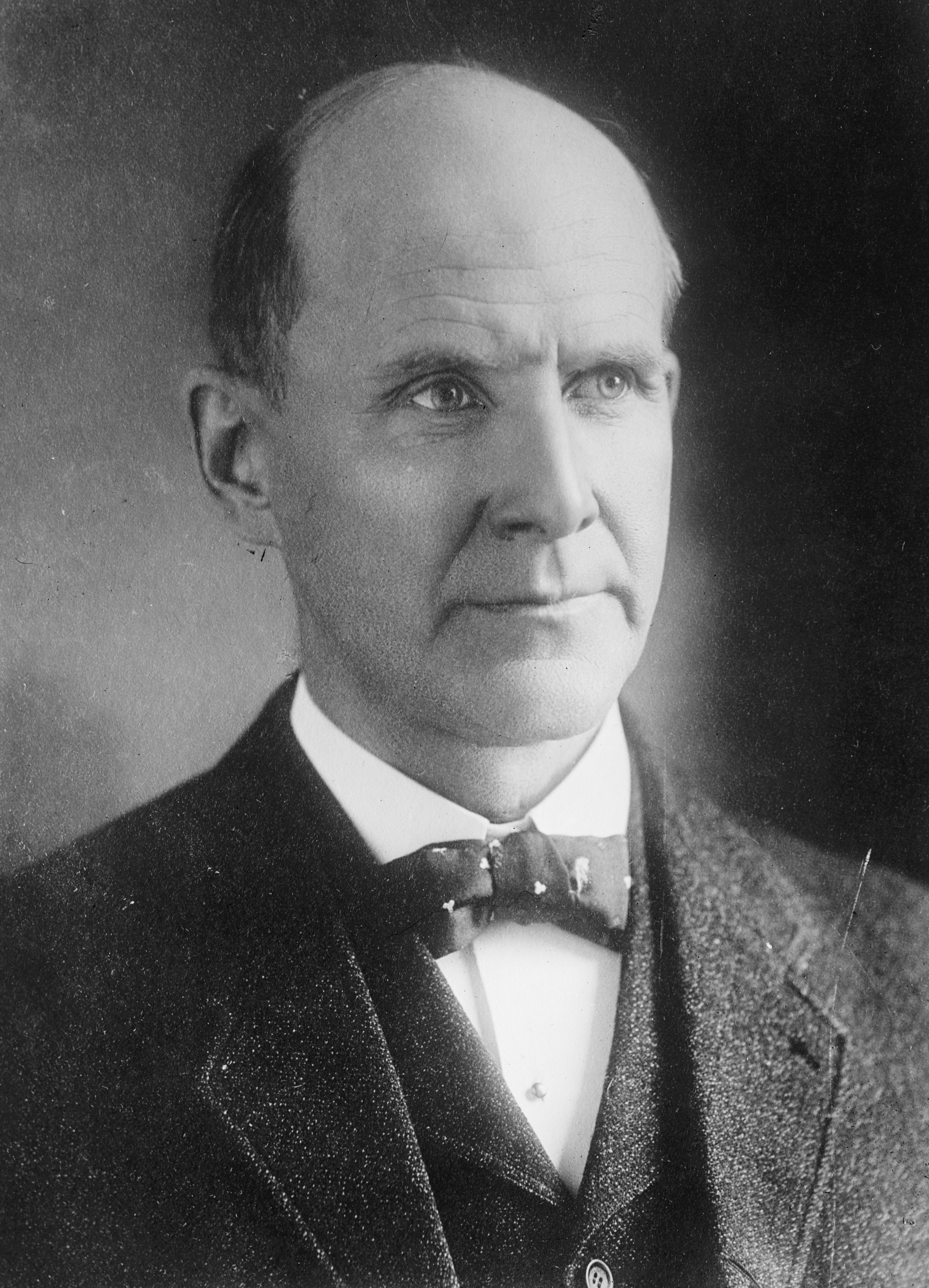
Nominee	Woodrow Wilson	William Howard Taft
Party	Democratic	Republican
Home state	New Jersey	Ohio
Running mate	Thomas R. Marshall	Nicholas Murray Butler
Electoral vote	24	0
Popular vote	424,834	278,168
Percentage	40.96%	26.82%
Nominee	Theodore Roosevelt	Eugene V. Debs
Party	Progressive	Socialist
Home state	New York	Indiana
Running mate	Hiram Johnson	Emil Seidel
Electoral vote	0	0
Popular vote	229,807	90,144
Percentage	22.16%	8.69%
County results
Wilson
20–30%
30–40%
40–50%
50–60%
60–70%
Taft
30–40%
40–50%
Roosevelt
30–40%
40–50%
50–60%
President before election
William Howard Taft
Republican
Elected President
Woodrow Wilson
Democratic

The 1912 United States presidential election in Ohio took place on November 5, 1912 as part of the 1912 United States presidential election. State voters chose 24 electors to the Electoral College, which selected the president and vice president.

Ohio was won by the Democratic nominee Woodrow Wilson and his running mate Thomas R. Marshall. As a result of his victory, Wilson became the first Democratic presidential candidate since Franklin Pierce in 1852 to win the state. Due to the creation of the Republican party two years after that victory, in 1854, Taft became the first ever Presidential nominee of the Republican party to lose Ohio.

Ohio had been a Republican state since 1856, but broke tradition due to the strong performance by the Progressive Party (also known as the Bull Moose Party) led by Theodore Roosevelt, which ultimately split the Republican vote. Theodore Roosevelt was able to gain 22.16 percent of the popular vote - though trailed the Republican Party nominee William Howard Taft, an Ohio native, who won 26.82% of the popular vote, and Wilson of the Democratic Party who won 40.96% of the popular vote. It marked Ohio's shift from a reliably Republican state to a bellwether state, as it would vote for the winning candidate in every presidential election thereafter except 1944, 1960, and 2020.

== Results ==
1912 United States presidential election in Ohio
Party	Candidate	Votes	Percentage	Electoral votes
Democratic	Woodrow Wilson	424,834	40.96%	24
Republican	William Howard Taft (incumbent)	278,168	26.82%	0
Progressive	Theodore Roosevelt	229,807	22.16%	0
Socialist	Eugene V. Debs	90,144	8.69%	0
Prohibition	Eugene W. Chafin	11,511	1.11%	0
Socialist Labor	Arthur E. Reimer	2,630	0.25%	0
Totals		1,037,094	100.0%	24

=== Results by county ===
County	Woodrow Wilson Democratic		William Howard Taft Republican		Theodore Roosevelt Progressive "Bull Moose"		Eugene Debs Socialist		Eugene Chafin Prohibition		Arthur Reimer Socialist Labor		Margin		Total votes cast
County	#	%	#	%	#	%	#	%	#	%	#	%	#	%	Total votes cast
Adams	2,279	46.52%	1,863	38.03%	563	11.49%	133	2.71%	54	1.10%	7	0.14%	416	8.49%	4,899
Allen	5,696	48.21%	2,638	22.33%	2,337	19.78%	977	8.27%	140	1.18%	27	0.23%	3,058	25.88%	11,815
Ashland	3,364	53.45%	1,017	16.16%	1,559	24.77%	274	4.35%	64	1.02%	16	0.25%	1,805 (Note: In this county where Roosevelt ran second ahead of Taft, the margin given is that between Wilson and Roosevelt (Wilson positive).)	28.68%	6,294
Ashtabula	3,181	25.84%	2,214	17.99%	5,189	42.16%	1,552	12.61%	142	1.15%	30	0.24%	-2,008	-16.31%	12,308
Athens	2,393	25.23%	3,090	32.58%	2,811	29.64%	1,056	11.14%	106	1.12%	27	0.28%	279 (Note: In this county where Roosevelt ran second ahead of Wilson, the margin given is that between Taft and Roosevelt (Taft positive).)	2.94%	9,483
Auglaize	3,726	55.81%	1,401	20.99%	1,025	15.35%	460	6.89%	56	0.84%	8	0.12%	2,325	34.83%	6,676
Belmont	5,412	34.94%	5,267	34.00%	1,584	10.23%	2,731	17.63%	433	2.80%	64	0.41%	145	0.94%	15,491
Brown	3,451	59.13%	1,650	28.27%	569	9.75%	125	2.14%	39	0.67%	2	0.03%	1,801	30.86%	5,836
Butler	7,763	46.59%	3,431	20.59%	1,787	10.72%	3,500	21.00%	99	0.59%	83	0.50%	4,263 (Note: In this county where Debs ran second ahead of Taft, the margin given is that between Wilson and Debs.)	25.58%	16,663
Carroll	1,293	34.74%	1,096	29.45%	1,089	29.26%	108	2.90%	128	3.44%	8	0.21%	197	5.29%	3,722
Champaign	2,763	40.53%	2,392	35.08%	1,423	20.87%	172	2.52%	62	0.91%	6	0.09%	371	5.44%	6,818
Clark	5,217	31.25%	6,036	36.16%	3,239	19.40%	1,909	11.44%	246	1.47%	46	0.28%	-819	-4.91%	16,693
Clermont	3,610	47.52%	2,543	33.47%	1,115	14.68%	269	3.54%	51	0.67%	9	0.12%	1,067	14.05%	7,597
Clinton	2,010	33.56%	2,916	48.68%	841	14.04%	146	2.44%	72	1.20%	5	0.08%	-906	-15.13%	5,990
Columbiana	4,816	29.93%	4,601	28.59%	3,811	23.68%	1,916	11.91%	915	5.69%	32	0.20%	215	1.34%	16,091
Coshocton	3,465	47.77%	1,984	27.35%	968	13.34%	667	9.19%	148	2.04%	22	0.30%	1,481	20.42%	7,254
Crawford	4,733	58.84%	1,432	17.80%	1,176	14.62%	588	7.31%	93	1.16%	22	0.27%	3,301	41.04%	8,044
Cuyahoga	43,610	42.49%	14,176	13.81%	33,824	32.96%	10,096	9.84%	373	0.36%	545	0.53%	9,786	9.54%	102,624
Darke	5,027	49.24%	3,107	30.43%	1,175	11.51%	296	2.90%	595	5.83%	9	0.09%	1,920	18.81%	10,209
Defiance	2,784	50.58%	872	15.84%	1,459	26.51%	331	6.01%	51	0.93%	7	0.13%	1,325	24.07%	5,504
Delaware	2,934	40.10%	2,584	35.32%	1,510	20.64%	123	1.68%	157	2.15%	8	0.11%	350	4.78%	7,316
Erie	3,504	39.29%	2,695	30.22%	1,675	18.78%	961	10.77%	54	0.61%	30	0.34%	809	9.07%	8,919
Fairfield	5,101	57.45%	1,672	18.83%	1,774	19.98%	188	2.12%	138	1.55%	6	0.07%	3,327	37.47%	8,879
Fayette	2,261	41.08%	2,186	39.72%	844	15.33%	141	2.56%	69	1.25%	3	0.05%	75	1.36%	5,504
Franklin	20,697	40.81%	12,791	25.22%	11,737	23.14%	5,005	9.87%	398	0.78%	87	0.17%	7,906	15.59%	50,715
Fulton	1,805	34.28%	929	17.64%	2,304	43.76%	164	3.11%	55	1.04%	8	0.15%	-499	-9.48%	5,265
Gallia	1,765	32.87%	1,355	25.23%	2,027	37.75%	170	3.17%	48	0.89%	5	0.09%	-262	-4.88%	5,370
Geauga	873	27.47%	579	18.22%	1,618	50.91%	77	2.42%	24	0.76%	7	0.22%	-745	-23.44%	3,178
Greene	2,107	29.92%	3,242	46.03%	993	14.10%	533	7.57%	151	2.14%	17	0.24%	-1,135	-16.12%	7,043
Guernsey	2,726	29.98%	3,426	37.68%	1,373	15.10%	1,342	14.76%	180	1.98%	45	0.49%	-700	-7.70%	9,092
Hamilton	42,909	39.03%	42,119	38.31%	16,828	15.31%	7,542	6.86%	384	0.35%	167	0.15%	790	0.72%	109,949
Hancock	4,309	47.66%	2,241	24.79%	1,757	19.43%	614	6.79%	104	1.15%	16	0.18%	2,068	22.87%	9,041
Hardin	3,912	46.83%	2,775	33.22%	1,236	14.80%	313	3.75%	93	1.11%	25	0.30%	1,137	13.61%	8,354
Harrison	1,714	37.29%	1,950	42.43%	704	15.32%	147	3.20%	76	1.65%	5	0.11%	-236	-5.13%	4,596
Henry	2,994	57.20%	804	15.36%	1,166	22.28%	204	3.90%	55	1.05%	11	0.21%	1,828	34.93%	5,234
Highland	3,314	44.43%	2,757	36.96%	1,116	14.96%	185	2.48%	80	1.07%	7	0.09%	557	7.47%	7,459
Hocking	2,295	45.79%	1,354	27.02%	935	18.66%	368	7.34%	46	0.92%	14	0.28%	941	18.77%	5,012
Holmes	2,429	66.90%	465	12.81%	581	16.00%	123	3.39%	29	0.80%	4	0.11%	1,848	50.90%	3,631
Huron	3,317	40.05%	1,707	20.61%	2,810	33.92%	356	4.30%	71	0.86%	22	0.27%	507	6.12%	8,283
Jackson	2,049	33.12%	1,860	30.06%	1,584	25.60%	612	9.89%	53	0.86%	29	0.47%	189	3.05%	6,187
Jefferson	3,171	27.78%	4,777	41.85%	2,042	17.89%	1,193	10.45%	205	1.80%	27	0.24%	-1,606	-14.07%	11,415
Knox	3,632	46.01%	2,530	32.05%	1,226	15.53%	396	5.02%	96	1.22%	14	0.18%	1,102	13.96%	7,894
Lake	1,429	28.34%	1,155	22.91%	2,115	41.95%	299	5.93%	29	0.58%	15	0.30%	-686	-13.61%	5,042
Lawrence	2,042	28.81%	2,650	37.39%	1,937	27.33%	407	5.74%	45	0.63%	6	0.08%	-608	-8.58%	7,087
Licking	6,120	46.01%	4,487	33.73%	1,683	12.65%	819	6.16%	162	1.22%	30	0.23%	1,633	12.28%	13,301
Logan	2,727	37.34%	1,977	27.07%	2,278	31.19%	229	3.14%	84	1.15%	9	0.12%	449	6.15%	7,304
Lorain	4,591	33.71%	2,226	16.34%	5,156	37.85%	1,556	11.42%	67	0.49%	25	0.18%	-565	-4.15%	13,621
Lucas	13,999	37.22%	5,622	14.95%	12,442	33.08%	5,173	13.75%	216	0.57%	158	0.42%	1,557	4.14%	37,610
Madison	2,172	41.48%	2,271	43.37%	681	13.01%	66	1.26%	45	0.86%	1	0.02%	-99	-1.89%	5,236
Mahoning	6,838	33.03%	5,839	28.20%	5,226	25.24%	2,422	11.70%	321	1.55%	57	0.28%	999	4.83%	20,703
Marion	4,024	45.07%	3,218	36.04%	934	10.46%	639	7.16%	98	1.10%	15	0.17%	806	9.03%	8,928
Medina	2,108	37.15%	685	12.07%	2,514	44.31%	302	5.32%	55	0.97%	10	0.18%	-406	-7.16%	5,674
Meigs	1,738	29.71%	2,129	36.39%	1,353	23.13%	548	9.37%	63	1.08%	19	0.32%	-391	-6.68%	5,850
Mercer	3,591	63.19%	1,324	23.30%	570	10.03%	126	2.22%	67	1.18%	5	0.09%	2,267	39.89%	5,683
Miami	4,310	38.74%	3,615	32.49%	2,056	18.48%	1,010	9.08%	111	1.00%	23	0.21%	695	6.25%	11,125
Monroe	3,199	66.08%	1,055	21.79%	380	7.85%	123	2.54%	77	1.59%	7	0.14%	2,144	44.29%	4,841
Montgomery	15,544	39.31%	10,341	26.15%	6,236	15.77%	7,079	17.90%	250	0.63%	88	0.22%	5,203	13.16%	39,538
Morgan	1,633	40.26%	1,448	35.70%	705	17.38%	141	3.48%	126	3.11%	3	0.07%	185	4.56%	4,056
Morrow	1,880	41.92%	1,240	27.65%	1,124	25.06%	102	2.27%	132	2.94%	7	0.16%	640	14.27%	4,485
Muskingum	5,376	38.47%	4,134	29.59%	3,207	22.95%	1,015	7.26%	221	1.58%	20	0.14%	1,242	8.89%	13,973
Noble	1,842	40.90%	1,804	40.05%	681	15.12%	96	2.13%	76	1.69%	5	0.11%	38	0.84%	4,504
Ottawa	2,728	59.16%	791	17.15%	957	20.75%	104	2.26%	23	0.50%	8	0.17%	1,771	38.41%	4,611
Paulding	2,296	43.58%	1,542	29.27%	1,223	23.21%	153	2.90%	53	1.01%	2	0.04%	754	14.31%	5,269
Perry	3,147	39.08%	1,739	21.60%	2,220	27.57%	806	10.01%	104	1.29%	36	0.45%	927	11.51%	8,052
Pickaway	3,311	52.41%	2,282	36.12%	569	9.01%	82	1.30%	68	1.08%	5	0.08%	1,029	16.29%	6,317
Pike	1,691	49.20%	1,184	34.45%	443	12.89%	81	2.36%	34	0.99%	4	0.12%	507	14.75%	3,437
Portage	2,855	38.65%	1,162	15.73%	2,583	34.97%	681	9.22%	101	1.37%	5	0.07%	272	3.68%	7,387
Preble	2,859	46.43%	2,135	34.67%	910	14.78%	177	2.87%	76	1.23%	1	0.02%	724	11.76%	6,158
Putnam	4,000	62.40%	1,000	15.60%	1,182	18.44%	144	2.25%	69	1.08%	15	0.23%	2,818	43.96%	6,410
Richland	5,201	48.62%	2,389	22.33%	2,058	19.24%	925	8.65%	97	0.91%	28	0.26%	2,812	26.29%	10,698
Ross	4,494	45.89%	3,600	36.76%	1,096	11.19%	464	4.74%	122	1.25%	16	0.16%	894	9.13%	9,792
Sandusky	4,333	50.66%	1,576	18.43%	2,103	24.59%	446	5.21%	77	0.90%	18	0.21%	2,230	26.07%	8,553
Scioto	3,508	33.26%	3,609	34.22%	2,012	19.08%	1,222	11.59%	168	1.59%	28	0.27%	-101	-0.96%	10,547
Seneca	5,082	49.63%	2,362	23.07%	2,062	20.14%	567	5.54%	147	1.44%	20	0.20%	2,720	26.56%	10,240
Shelby	3,305	56.00%	1,613	27.33%	678	11.49%	245	4.15%	52	0.88%	9	0.15%	1,692	28.67%	5,902
Stark	9,908	37.07%	6,033	22.57%	6,802	25.45%	3,606	13.49%	309	1.16%	71	0.27%	3,106	11.62%	26,729
Summit	7,786	33.57%	3,502	15.10%	7,473	32.22%	3,936	16.97%	378	1.63%	117	0.50%	313	1.35%	23,192
Trumbull	3,347	29.42%	2,633	23.15%	3,556	31.26%	1,640	14.42%	161	1.42%	38	0.33%	-209	-1.84%	11,375
Tuscarawas	4,978	39.84%	3,417	27.34%	1,749	14.00%	2,177	17.42%	105	0.84%	70	0.56%	1,561	12.49%	12,496
Union	2,362	40.68%	2,051	35.32%	1,209	20.82%	121	2.08%	59	1.02%	5	0.09%	311	5.36%	5,807
Van Wert	3,287	46.26%	2,490	35.04%	1,050	14.78%	209	2.94%	60	0.84%	10	0.14%	797	11.22%	7,106
Vinton	1,228	41.11%	952	31.87%	581	19.45%	203	6.80%	15	0.50%	8	0.27%	276	9.24%	2,987
Warren	2,101	33.52%	2,788	44.49%	1,100	17.55%	207	3.30%	61	0.97%	10	0.16%	-687	-10.96%	6,267
Washington	4,637	46.65%	3,326	33.46%	1,222	12.29%	618	6.22%	121	1.22%	17	0.17%	1,311	13.19%	9,941
Wayne	4,737	51.14%	1,674	18.07%	2,351	25.38%	350	3.78%	137	1.48%	14	0.15%	2,386	25.76%	9,263
Williams	2,875	44.81%	1,145	17.85%	2,081	32.43%	219	3.41%	81	1.26%	15	0.23%	794	12.38%	6,416
Wood	4,356	43.46%	2,020	20.15%	3,021	30.14%	473	4.72%	133	1.33%	21	0.21%	1,335	13.32%	10,024
Wyandot	2,848	54.46%	1,409	26.94%	854	16.33%	93	1.78%	22	0.42%	4	0.08%	1,439	27.51%	5,230
Totals	424,834	40.96%	278,168	26.82%	229,807	22.16%	90,164	8.69%	11,511	1.11%	2,630	0.25%	146,666	14.14%	1,037,114

== See also ==
- United States presidential elections in Ohio
