= 1924 United States presidential election in Ohio =

- November 4, 1924

Nominee	Calvin Coolidge	John W. Davis	Robert M. La Follette
Party	Republican	Democratic	Progressive
Home state	Massachusetts	West Virginia	Wisconsin
Running mate	Charles G. Dawes	Charles W. Bryan	Burton K. Wheeler
Electoral vote	24	0	0
Popular vote	1,176,130	477,888	357,948
Percentage	58.33%	23.70%	17.75%
County results
Coolidge
40–50%
50–60%
60–70%
70–80%
Davis
40–50%
50–60%
President before election
Calvin Coolidge
Republican
Elected President
Calvin Coolidge
Republican

The 1924 United States presidential election in Ohio was held on November 4, 1924, as part of the 1924 United States presidential election. State voters chose twenty-four electors to the Electoral College, who voted for president and vice president.

Ohio was won decisively by the Republican Party candidate, incumbent president Calvin Coolidge with 58.33 percent of the popular vote. The Democratic Party candidate, John W. Davis, garnered only 23.70 percent of the popular vote.

The 1920s were a fiercely Republican decade in American politics, and Ohio in that era was a fiercely Republican state in presidential elections. The economic boom and good feelings of the Roaring Twenties under popular Republican leadership virtually guaranteed Calvin Coolidge an easy win in the state against the conservative Southern Democrat John Davis, who had little appeal in Northern states like Ohio where his reticence on the Ku Klux Klan was opposed by Catholics. Ohio did possess a very powerful Ku Klux Klan organization which had swept the state's elected offices in the previous year, but had a sufficiently large Catholic population that its delegates to the Democratic National Convention demanded an anti-KKK plank. Davis was also handicapped by a complete lack of support from local Democratic officeholders, despite efforts to campaign in the state in October.

Coolidge won a strong majority statewide even with the Republican vote being split by the strong third party candidacy of Senator Robert M. La Follette, who ran as the Progressive Party candidate and peeled away the votes of many German Americans and progressive Republicans. Owing to Ohio being the most German of the states immediately north of the boundary with antebellum slave states, Ohio was La Follette's best east of the Mississippi and Illinois Rivers (other than Wisconsin, which was his home state that he won) although his vote share was only one percent above his national figure. Nonetheless, La Follette easily outpolled Davis in the major urban areas of northern Ohio, and carried the city of Cleveland and many precincts elsewhere in Cuyahoga County on the strength of labor union support. To date, this was the best ever showing for the Republican Party in Ohio as no other Republican candidate has been able to match Coolidge's landslide 34.63% margin in the state.

== Results ==
1924 United States presidential election in Ohio
Party	Candidate	Votes	Percentage	Electoral votes
Republican	Calvin Coolidge (incumbent)	1,176,130	58.33%	24
Democratic	John W. Davis	477,888	23.70%	0
Progressive	Robert M. La Follette	357,948	17.75%	0
Socialist Labor	Frank Johns	3,025	0.15%	0
Commonwealth Land	William J. Wallace	1,246	0.06%	0
Totals		2,016,237	100.0%	24

=== Results by county ===
County	Calvin Coolidge Republican		John W. Davis Democratic		Robert M. La Follette Progressive		Frank Johns Socialist Labor		William J. Wallace Commonwealth Land		Margin		Total votes cast
County	#	%	#	%	#	%	#	%	#	%	#	%	Total votes cast
Adams	4,315	52.46%	3,762	45.73%	149	1.81%	0	0.00%	0	0.00%	553	6.72%	8,226
Allen	15,711	61.76%	7,378	29.00%	2,283	8.98%	59	0.23%	6	0.02%	8,333	32.76%	25,437
Ashland	5,777	52.68%	4,377	39.91%	802	7.31%	7	0.06%	3	0.03%	1,400	12.77%	10,966
Ashtabula	14,767	69.21%	2,135	10.01%	4,370	20.48%	43	0.20%	22	0.10%	10,397 (Note: In this county where La Follette ran second ahead of Davis, the margin given is that between Coolidge and La Follette)	48.73%	21,337
Athens	8,695	58.19%	2,669	17.86%	3,501	23.43%	47	0.31%	31	0.21%	5,194	34.76%	14,943
Auglaize	5,507	51.86%	3,952	37.22%	1,143	10.76%	9	0.08%	7	0.07%	1,555	14.64%	10,618
Belmont	16,378	54.53%	8,074	26.88%	5,386	17.93%	155	0.52%	42	0.14%	8,304	27.65%	30,035
Brown	3,616	43.05%	4,120	49.05%	660	7.86%	1	0.01%	2	0.02%	-504	-6.00%	8,399
Butler	19,349	56.25%	11,612	33.76%	3,339	9.71%	84	0.24%	14	0.04%	7,737	22.49%	34,398
Carroll	4,369	70.78%	1,430	23.17%	364	5.90%	7	0.11%	3	0.05%	2,939	47.61%	6,173
Champaign	6,181	60.33%	3,575	34.90%	478	4.67%	10	0.10%	1	0.01%	2,606	25.44%	10,245
Clark	20,340	66.44%	8,415	27.49%	1,816	5.93%	27	0.09%	17	0.06%	11,925	38.95%	30,615
Clermont	6,867	55.18%	4,544	36.51%	1,019	8.19%	10	0.08%	5	0.04%	2,323	18.67%	12,445
Clinton	5,954	67.08%	2,496	28.12%	421	4.74%	3	0.03%	2	0.02%	3,458	38.96%	8,876
Columbiana	20,483	69.97%	4,685	16.01%	4,036	13.79%	47	0.16%	21	0.07%	15,798	53.97%	29,272
Coshocton	5,837	49.77%	4,415	37.64%	1,456	12.41%	11	0.09%	10	0.09%	1,422	12.12%	11,729
Crawford	5,896	40.83%	4,384	30.36%	4,140	28.67%	14	0.10%	6	0.04%	1,512	10.47%	14,440
Cuyahoga	130,169	49.29%	24,000	9.09%	109,287	41.39%	392	0.15%	218	0.08%	20,882	7.91%	264,066
Darke	9,166	52.92%	7,316	42.24%	811	4.68%	22	0.13%	6	0.03%	1,850	10.68%	17,321
Defiance	4,841	52.55%	3,227	35.03%	1,134	12.31%	6	0.07%	5	0.05%	1,614	17.52%	9,213
Delaware	6,731	60.41%	3,537	31.74%	866	7.77%	5	0.04%	3	0.03%	3,194	28.67%	11,142
Erie	7,689	54.34%	2,968	20.97%	3,462	24.46%	24	0.17%	8	0.06%	4,227	29.87%	14,151
Fairfield	8,281	53.80%	5,890	38.26%	1,200	7.80%	16	0.10%	6	0.04%	2,391	15.53%	15,393
Fayette	4,542	60.27%	2,696	35.77%	293	3.89%	5	0.07%	0	0.00%	1,846	24.50%	7,536
Franklin	61,891	57.68%	26,505	24.70%	18,743	17.47%	116	0.11%	40	0.04%	35,386	32.98%	107,295
Fulton	4,951	69.56%	1,333	18.73%	832	11.69%	1	0.01%	1	0.01%	3,618	50.83%	7,118
Gallia	4,325	61.21%	2,284	32.32%	453	6.41%	3	0.04%	1	0.01%	2,041	28.88%	7,066
Geauga	3,375	72.39%	635	13.62%	642	13.77%	6	0.13%	4	0.09%	2,733	58.62%	4,662
Greene	8,410	72.98%	2,471	21.44%	628	5.45%	13	0.11%	1	0.01%	5,939	51.54%	11,523
Guernsey	8,997	59.56%	3,604	23.86%	2,455	16.25%	28	0.19%	22	0.15%	5,393	35.70%	15,106
Hamilton	115,950	60.70%	34,916	18.28%	39,768	20.82%	264	0.14%	131	0.07%	76,182	39.88%	191,029
Hancock	9,167	57.03%	5,111	31.80%	1,764	10.97%	23	0.14%	9	0.06%	4,056	25.23%	16,074
Hardin	7,112	53.66%	5,523	41.67%	613	4.63%	3	0.02%	3	0.02%	1,589	11.99%	13,254
Harrison	4,904	65.97%	1,999	26.89%	520	6.99%	8	0.11%	3	0.04%	2,905	39.08%	7,434
Henry	3,855	45.51%	2,922	34.50%	1,693	19.99%	0	0.00%	0	0.00%	933	11.02%	8,470
Highland	6,845	57.16%	4,583	38.27%	535	4.47%	8	0.07%	5	0.04%	2,262	18.89%	11,976
Hocking	4,086	50.46%	2,854	35.24%	1,136	14.03%	17	0.21%	5	0.06%	1,232	15.21%	8,098
Holmes	1,824	38.26%	2,539	53.25%	400	8.39%	4	0.08%	1	0.02%	-715	-15.00%	4,768
Huron	8,340	62.12%	2,871	21.39%	2,186	16.28%	19	0.14%	9	0.07%	5,469	40.74%	13,425
Jackson	5,977	61.45%	2,848	29.28%	869	8.93%	27	0.28%	6	0.06%	3,129	32.17%	9,727
Jefferson	14,929	67.97%	3,840	17.48%	3,097	14.10%	75	0.34%	22	0.10%	11,089	50.49%	21,963
Knox	7,519	57.43%	4,721	36.06%	852	6.51%	0	0.00%	1	0.01%	2,798	21.37%	13,093
Lake	7,727	70.71%	974	8.91%	2,208	20.21%	8	0.07%	10	0.09%	5,519	50.51%	10,927
Lawrence	6,798	63.96%	2,729	25.68%	1,078	10.14%	20	0.19%	3	0.03%	4,069	38.29%	10,628
Licking	13,914	58.49%	7,428	31.23%	2,418	10.16%	14	0.06%	14	0.06%	6,486	27.27%	23,788
Logan	7,186	61.03%	3,176	26.97%	1,393	11.83%	12	0.10%	7	0.06%	4,010	34.06%	11,774
Lorain	17,062	61.43%	3,965	14.28%	6,680	24.05%	42	0.15%	25	0.09%	10,382	37.38%	27,774
Lucas	53,670	55.39%	11,948	12.33%	31,039	32.03%	160	0.17%	85	0.09%	22,631	23.35%	96,902
Madison	4,829	61.97%	2,685	34.46%	278	3.57%	0	0.00%	0	0.00%	2,144	27.52%	7,792
Mahoning	37,647	68.12%	9,335	16.89%	8,102	14.66%	127	0.23%	53	0.10%	28,312	51.23%	55,264
Marion	9,161	54.20%	5,234	30.97%	2,475	14.64%	23	0.14%	8	0.05%	3,927	23.24%	16,901
Medina	6,756	67.76%	1,844	18.49%	1,351	13.55%	16	0.16%	4	0.04%	4,912	49.26%	9,971
Meigs	4,864	57.28%	1,944	22.89%	1,648	19.41%	27	0.32%	9	0.11%	2,920	34.39%	8,492
Mercer	4,215	40.40%	5,135	49.21%	1,071	10.26%	9	0.09%	4	0.04%	-920	-8.82%	10,434
Miami	11,851	62.70%	5,296	28.02%	1,726	9.13%	13	0.07%	15	0.08%	6,555	34.68%	18,901
Monroe	2,674	40.58%	3,742	56.79%	165	2.50%	6	0.09%	2	0.03%	-1,068	-16.21%	6,589
Montgomery	50,845	62.61%	21,860	26.92%	8,312	10.24%	144	0.18%	49	0.06%	28,985	35.69%	81,210
Morgan	3,553	60.94%	2,072	35.54%	199	3.41%	5	0.09%	1	0.02%	1,481	25.40%	5,830
Morrow	3,790	57.39%	2,379	36.02%	435	6.59%	0	0.00%	0	0.00%	1,411	21.37%	6,604
Muskingum	15,571	65.71%	6,709	28.31%	1,377	5.81%	28	0.12%	12	0.05%	8,862	37.40%	23,697
Noble	4,284	60.78%	2,485	35.26%	272	3.86%	4	0.06%	3	0.04%	1,799	25.52%	7,048
Ottawa	4,137	51.77%	2,571	32.17%	1,274	15.94%	6	0.08%	3	0.04%	1,566	19.60%	7,991
Paulding	3,648	57.79%	2,242	35.52%	414	6.56%	5	0.08%	3	0.05%	1,406	22.28%	6,312
Perry	7,592	58.11%	3,702	28.34%	1,718	13.15%	36	0.28%	17	0.13%	3,890	29.77%	13,065
Pickaway	4,166	46.24%	4,539	50.38%	293	3.25%	5	0.06%	6	0.07%	-373	-4.14%	9,009
Pike	2,569	43.87%	3,185	54.39%	100	1.71%	1	0.02%	1	0.02%	-616	-10.52%	5,856
Portage	8,583	62.43%	2,994	21.78%	2,131	15.50%	26	0.19%	15	0.11%	5,589	40.65%	13,749
Preble	5,676	56.75%	4,033	40.33%	282	2.82%	7	0.07%	3	0.03%	1,643	16.43%	10,001
Putnam	4,377	41.83%	4,795	45.82%	1,283	12.26%	6	0.06%	4	0.04%	-418	-3.99%	10,465
Richland	12,013	55.50%	6,703	30.97%	2,905	13.42%	21	0.10%	3	0.01%	5,310	24.53%	21,645
Ross	8,431	53.86%	6,028	38.51%	1,178	7.53%	12	0.08%	4	0.03%	2,403	15.35%	15,653
Sandusky	9,381	60.88%	4,388	28.48%	1,626	10.55%	11	0.07%	2	0.01%	4,993	32.41%	15,408
Scioto	12,189	62.83%	5,532	28.51%	1,643	8.47%	34	0.18%	3	0.02%	6,657	34.31%	19,401
Seneca	9,641	53.29%	6,290	34.77%	2,119	11.71%	26	0.14%	15	0.08%	3,351	18.52%	18,091
Shelby	4,359	44.41%	4,840	49.31%	606	6.17%	6	0.06%	5	0.05%	-481	-4.90%	9,816
Stark	40,858	64.28%	12,544	19.74%	9,960	15.67%	170	0.27%	30	0.05%	28,314	44.55%	63,562
Summit	53,774	65.28%	17,533	21.29%	10,855	13.18%	160	0.19%	49	0.06%	36,241	44.00%	82,371
Trumbull	22,341	74.35%	4,007	13.33%	3,628	12.07%	56	0.19%	17	0.06%	18,334	61.01%	30,049
Tuscarawas	13,573	56.97%	5,566	23.36%	4,602	19.32%	68	0.29%	16	0.07%	8,007	33.61%	23,825
Union	5,256	62.74%	2,571	30.69%	540	6.45%	8	0.10%	3	0.04%	2,685	32.05%	8,378
Van Wert	6,206	53.14%	4,318	36.98%	1,138	9.74%	7	0.06%	9	0.08%	1,888	16.17%	11,678
Vinton	2,244	51.87%	1,838	42.49%	232	5.36%	8	0.18%	4	0.09%	406	9.39%	4,326
Warren	6,729	69.02%	2,406	24.68%	609	6.25%	3	0.03%	2	0.02%	4,323	44.34%	9,749
Washington	8,704	57.12%	5,727	37.58%	780	5.12%	20	0.13%	8	0.05%	2,977	19.54%	15,239
Wayne	8,928	53.80%	6,023	36.30%	1,624	9.79%	14	0.08%	5	0.03%	2,905	17.51%	16,594
Williams	5,802	56.41%	2,795	27.18%	1,671	16.25%	9	0.09%	8	0.08%	3,007	29.24%	10,285
Wood	10,665	65.33%	3,291	20.16%	2,347	14.38%	18	0.11%	4	0.02%	7,374	45.17%	16,325
Wyandot	3,973	50.86%	3,271	41.88%	561	7.18%	5	0.06%	1	0.01%	702	8.99%	7,811
Totals	1,176,130	58.33%	477,888	23.70%	357,948	17.75%	3,025	0.15%	1,246	0.06%	698,242	34.63%	2,016,237

== See also ==
- United States presidential elections in Ohio
