= 1864 Democratic National Convention =

U.S. political event held in Chicago, Illinois

- 1864 presidential election
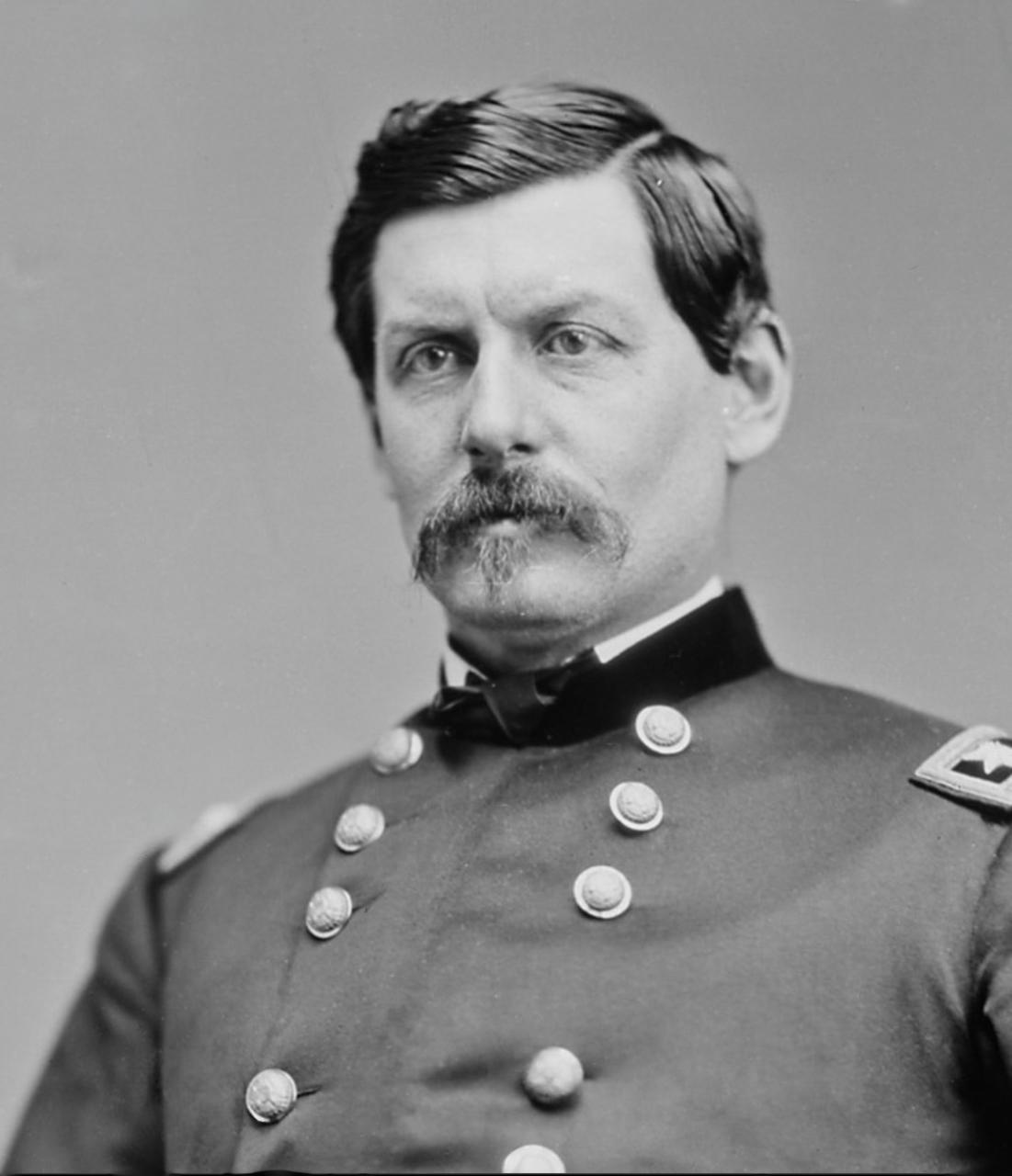
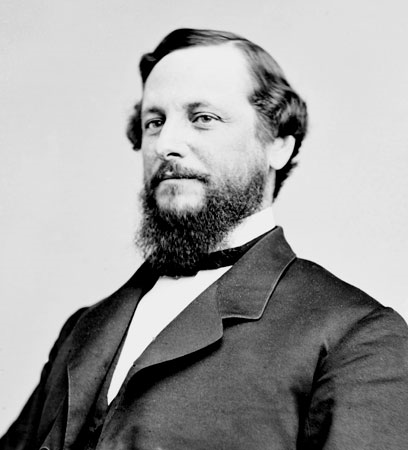
- Nominees; McClellan and Pendleton

Convention
- Dates: August 29–31, 1864
- City: Chicago, Illinois
- Venue: The Amphitheater

Candidates
- Presidential nominee: George B. McClellan of New Jersey
- Vice-presidential nominee: George H. Pendleton of Ohio

The 1864 Democratic National Convention was held at The Amphitheatre in Chicago, Illinois, United States.

The Convention nominated Major General George B. McClellan from New Jersey for president, and Representative George H. Pendleton of Ohio for vice president. McClellan, age 37 at the time of the convention, and Pendleton, age 39, are the youngest major party presidential ticket ever nominated in the United States.

== Background ==
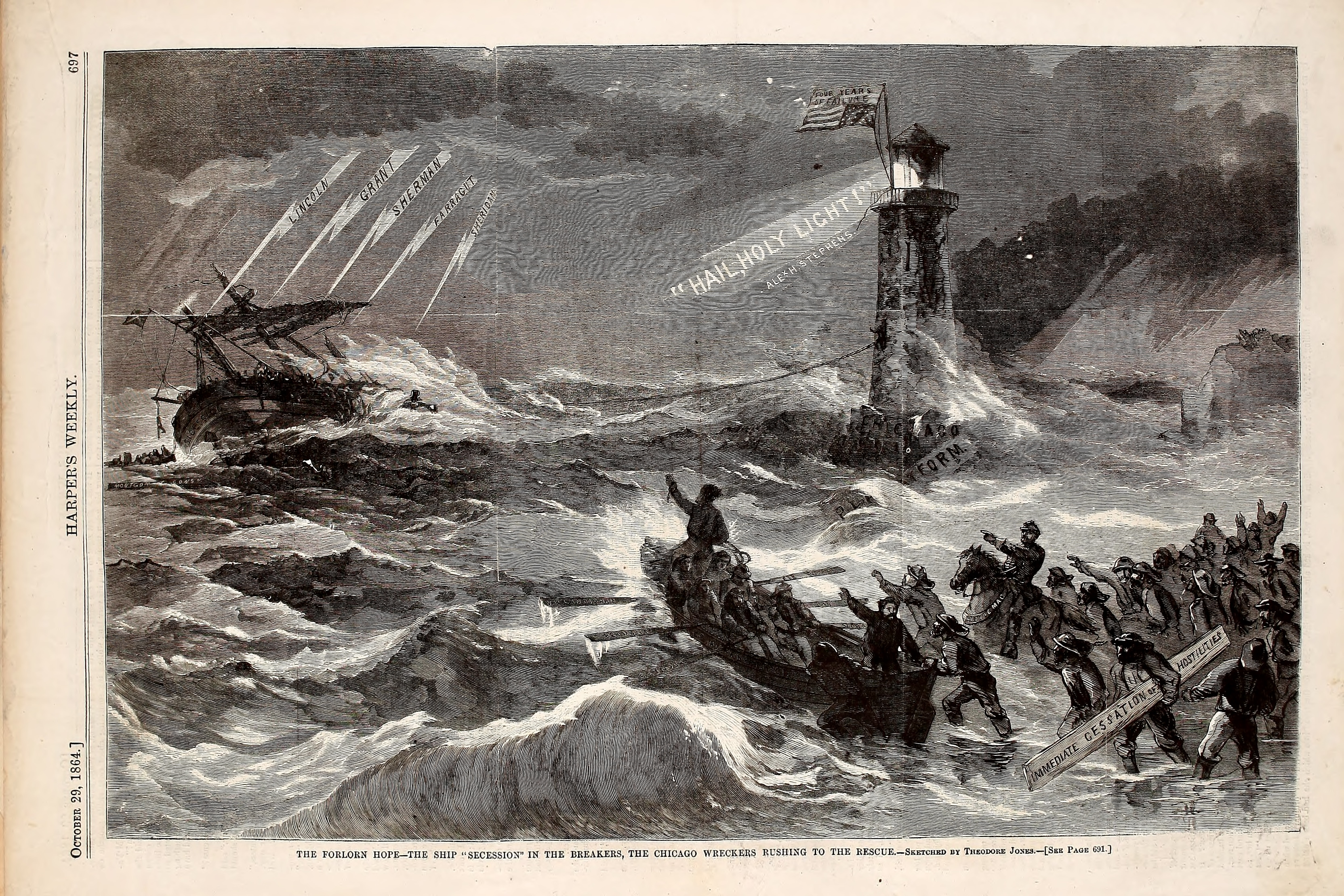
Woodblock etching political cartoon depicting a foundering Confederacy, with the possibility of being rescued by "Chicago Wreckers" (Peace Democrats from the Chicago convention). By Theodore Jones, Harper's Weekly, October 29, 1864.

The Democratic Party was bitterly split over the American Civil War between the War Democrats and the Peace Democrats. Also making matters complicated were the factions that existed among the Peace Democrats. For much of the war they had been dominated by the Copperheads, led by Clement Vallandigham. The Copperheads declared the war to be a failure and favored an immediate end to hostilities without securing Union victory, either via re-admitting all the Confederate states with slavery intact and legally protected, or by formally recognizing the Confederacy as a sovereign nation and attempting to re-establish peaceful relationships.

In 1863, the Peace Democrats started to splinter between the Copperheads and their more moderate members. Moderate Peace Democrats such as Horatio Seymour proposed a negotiated peace that would secure Union victory. They believed this was the best course of action because an armistice could finish the war without destroying the South. The Copperheads continued to advocate allowing the Confederate states to rejoin with slavery intact, however, believing that to do otherwise would merely lead to another Civil War sooner or later.

== Platform ==
On the first day of the convention, a peace platform was adopted. The platform declared the federal government's prosecution of the American Civil War a "failure". McClellan, the front-runner for the Democratic nomination, was personally opposed to a peace platform. McClellan supported the continuation of the war and restoration of the Union, but the party platform, written by Vallandigham, was opposed to this position.

== Presidential nomination ==
=== Presidential candidates ===
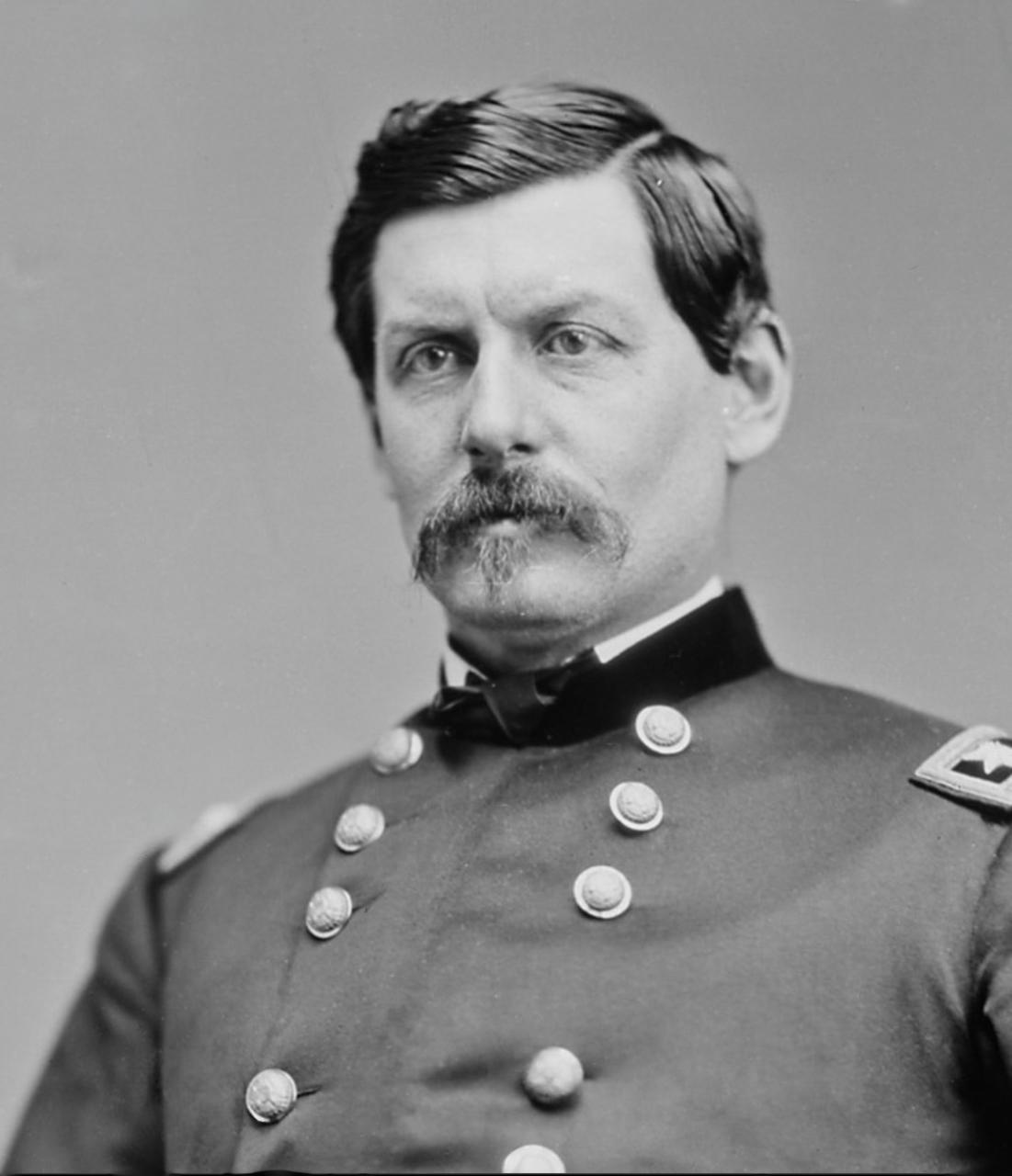
Major General
George B. McClellan
of New Jersey

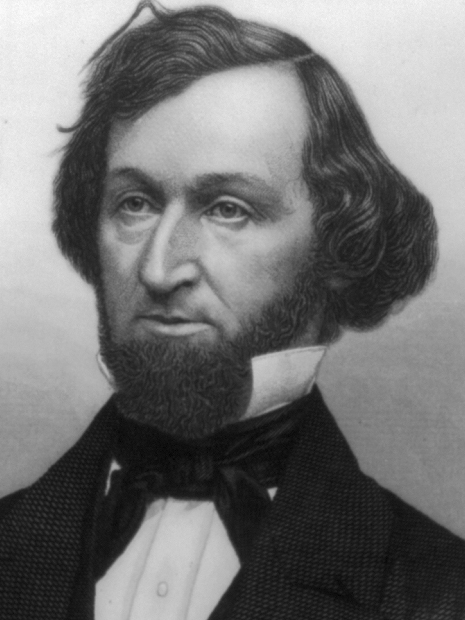
Former Governor
Thomas H. Seymour
of Connecticut

=== Declined ===
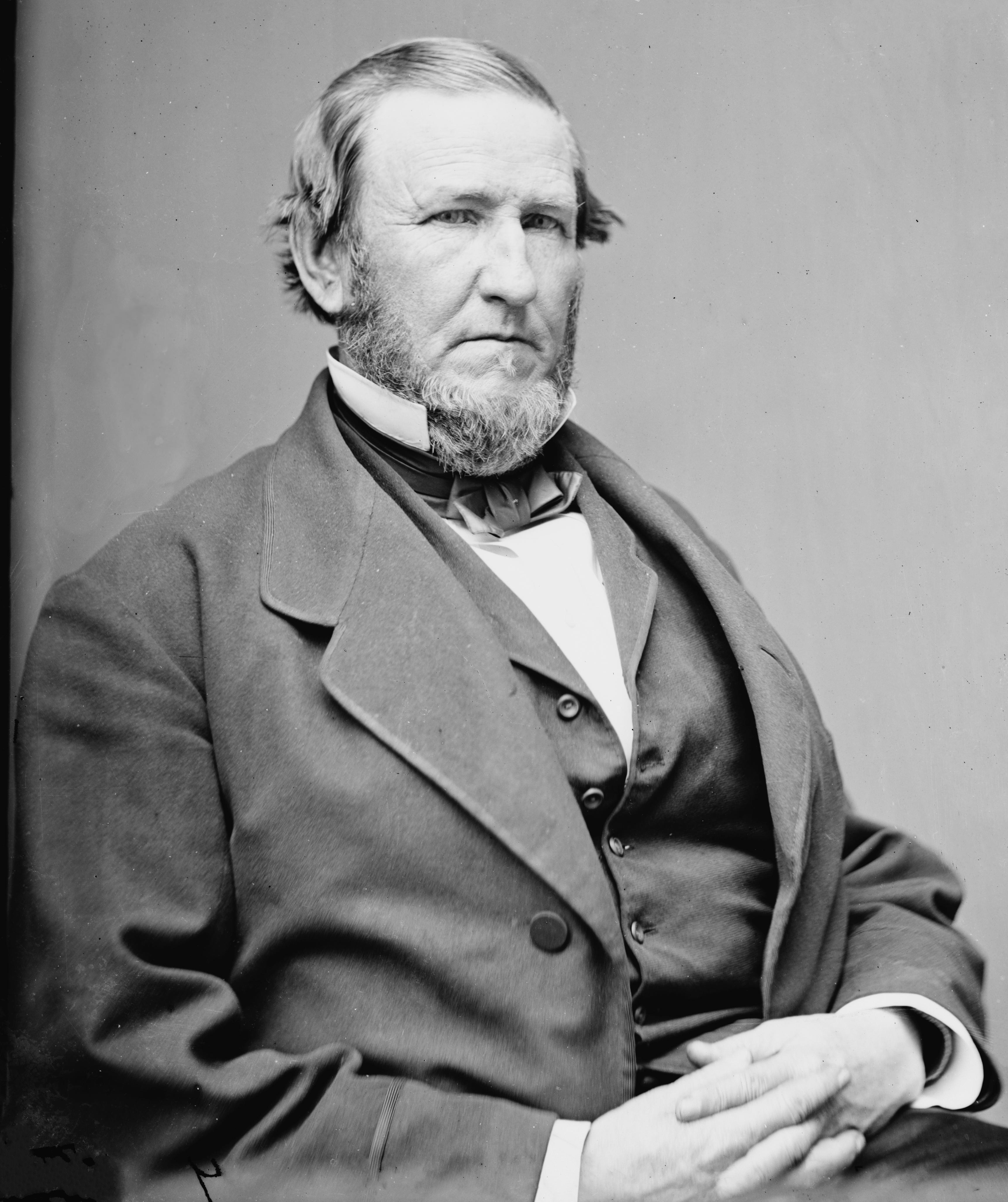
Senator
Lazarus W. Powell
of Kentucky

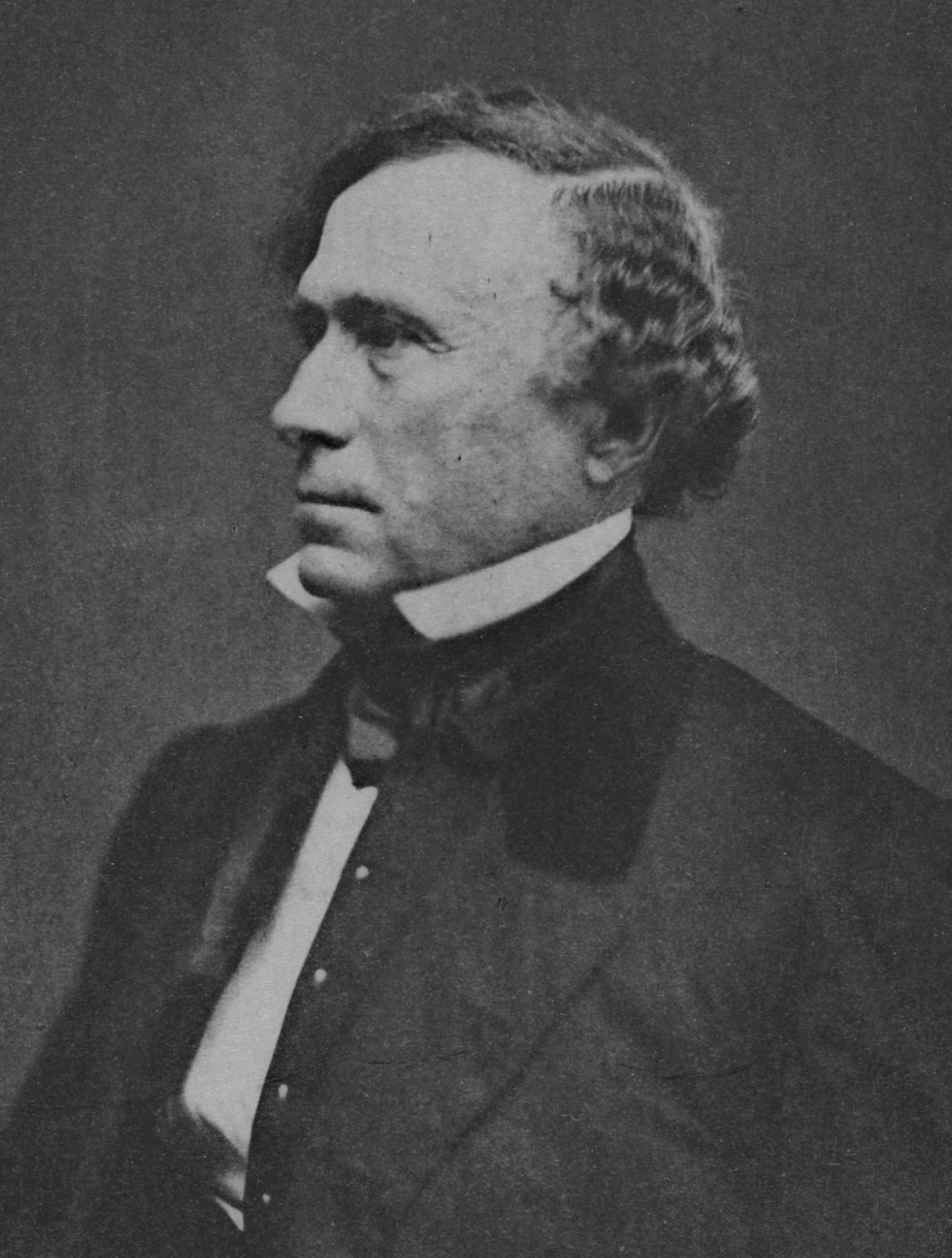
Former President
Franklin Pierce
from New Hampshire

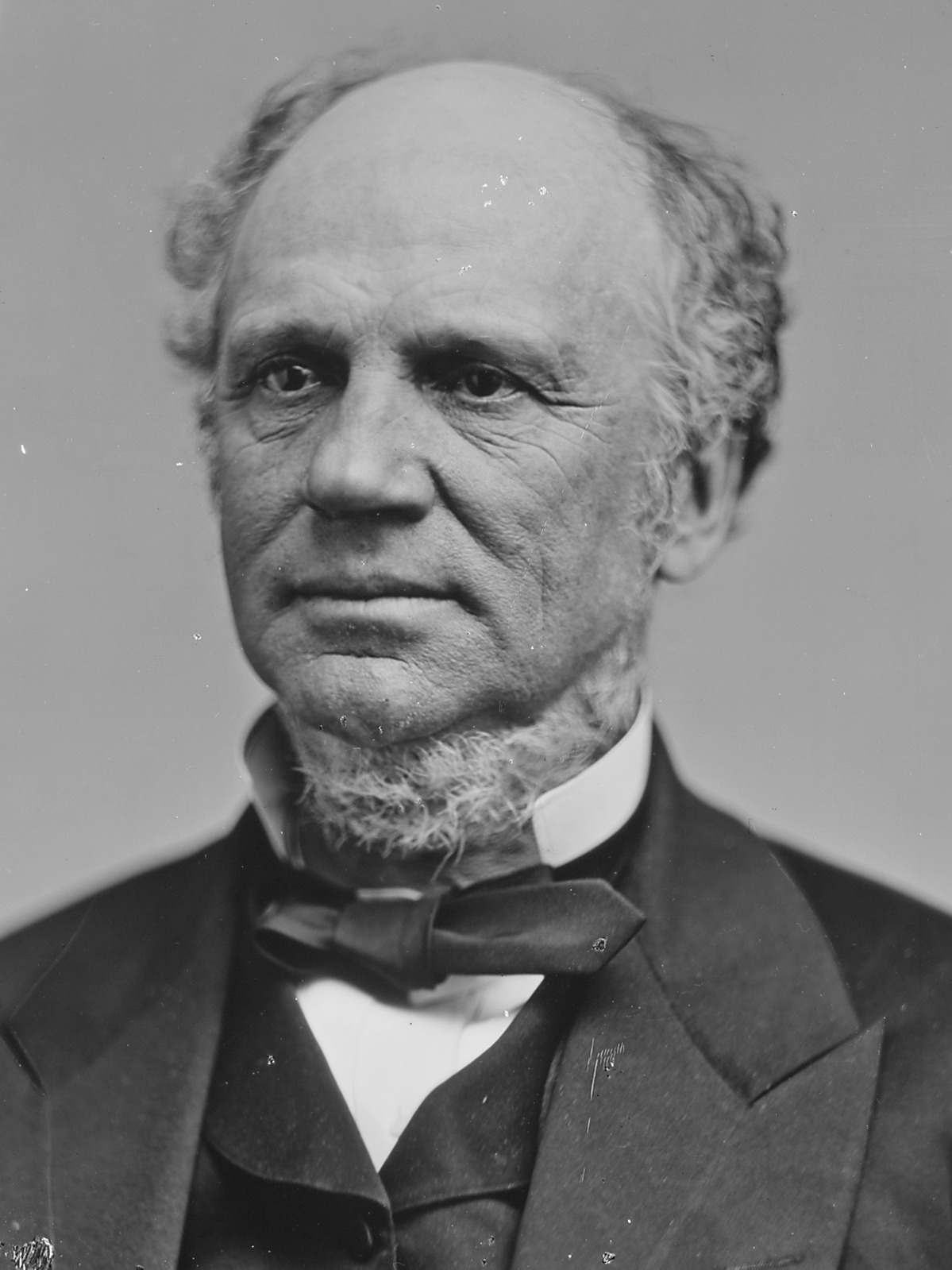
Governor
Horatio Seymour
of New York

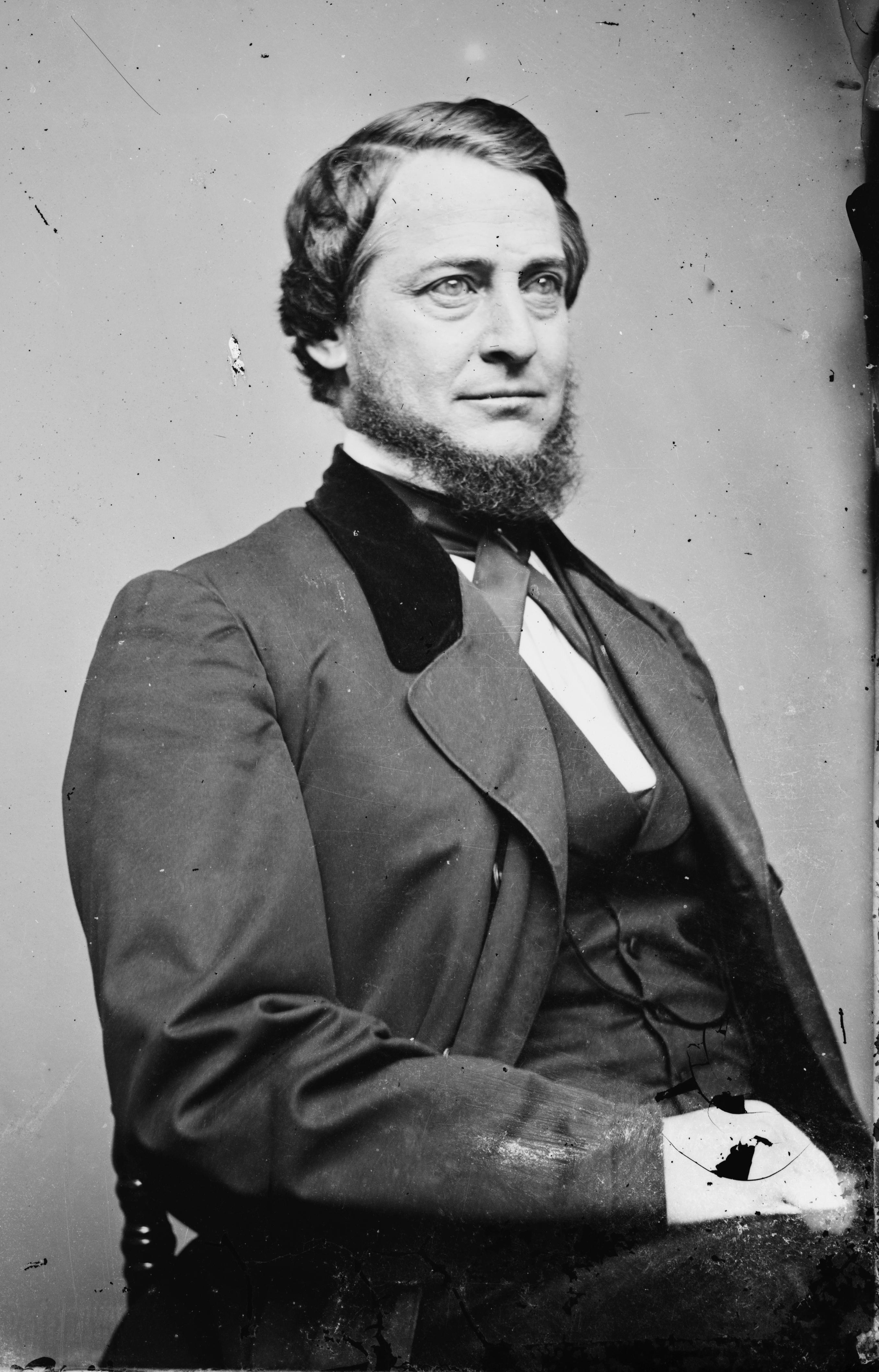
Former Representative
Clement Vallandigham
from Ohio

General George B. McClellan had widespread support from the War Democrats, and was generally seen as the front-runner. The Peace Democrats, however, found it much harder to come up with a candidate. Many of them had hoped that Horatio Seymour would act as their standard-bearer, but early in 1864 he broke with the Copperheads and aligned himself with the more moderate Peace Democrats. Many of his allies tried to get him to run anyway, believing that he would be an acceptable compromise candidate who could stop McClellan from being nominated, but on the day before the convention commenced, Seymour announced positively that he would not be a candidate. Nonetheless, a portion of the Illinois delegation placed Seymour's name in nomination during the convention. Seymour himself, acting as chairman of the convention, declared that the Illinois delegate was "not in order" since a different motion was already under discussion.

Vallandigham, the ideological leader of the Copperheads, recognized that he was too divisive a figure to earn the required two-thirds majority at the convention (indeed, he would be loudly booed by the War Democrats and even some of the more moderate Peace Democrats when he delivered a speech on the first day), and declined to put his name forward. Instead, the Copperheads eventually put forward former governor Thomas H. Seymour of Connecticut. Other candidates were placed in nomination before eventually being withdrawn. Senator Lazarus W. Powell was placed in nomination by the Delaware delegation, but Powell personally asked that his name be withdrawn since he believed the eventual Democratic presidential candidate "should come from one of the non-slaveholding States." Amid "great applause", a portion of the Kentucky delegation placed the name of former President Franklin Pierce before the convention. But Pierce's name was withdrawn from consideration when a delegate revealed that he had received both written and verbal instructions from Pierce stating that he did not wish to be presented as a candidate.

As the first ballot began, McClellan took a commanding lead over Seymour, with the support of both the War Democrats and the moderate Peace Democrats. The Copperheads, realizing that trying to stop McClellan's nomination would most likely be futile, soon started to throw their votes behind the general, who finished comfortably in excess of the required two-thirds majority at the end of the first ballot. A motion to have McClellan's nomination be declared unanimous was carried.

Presidential Ballot
	1st	1st (Revised)	Unanimous
McClellan	174	202.5	226
T. Seymour	38	23.5	
H. Seymour	12	0	
O'Conor	0.5	0	
Not Voting	1.5	0	

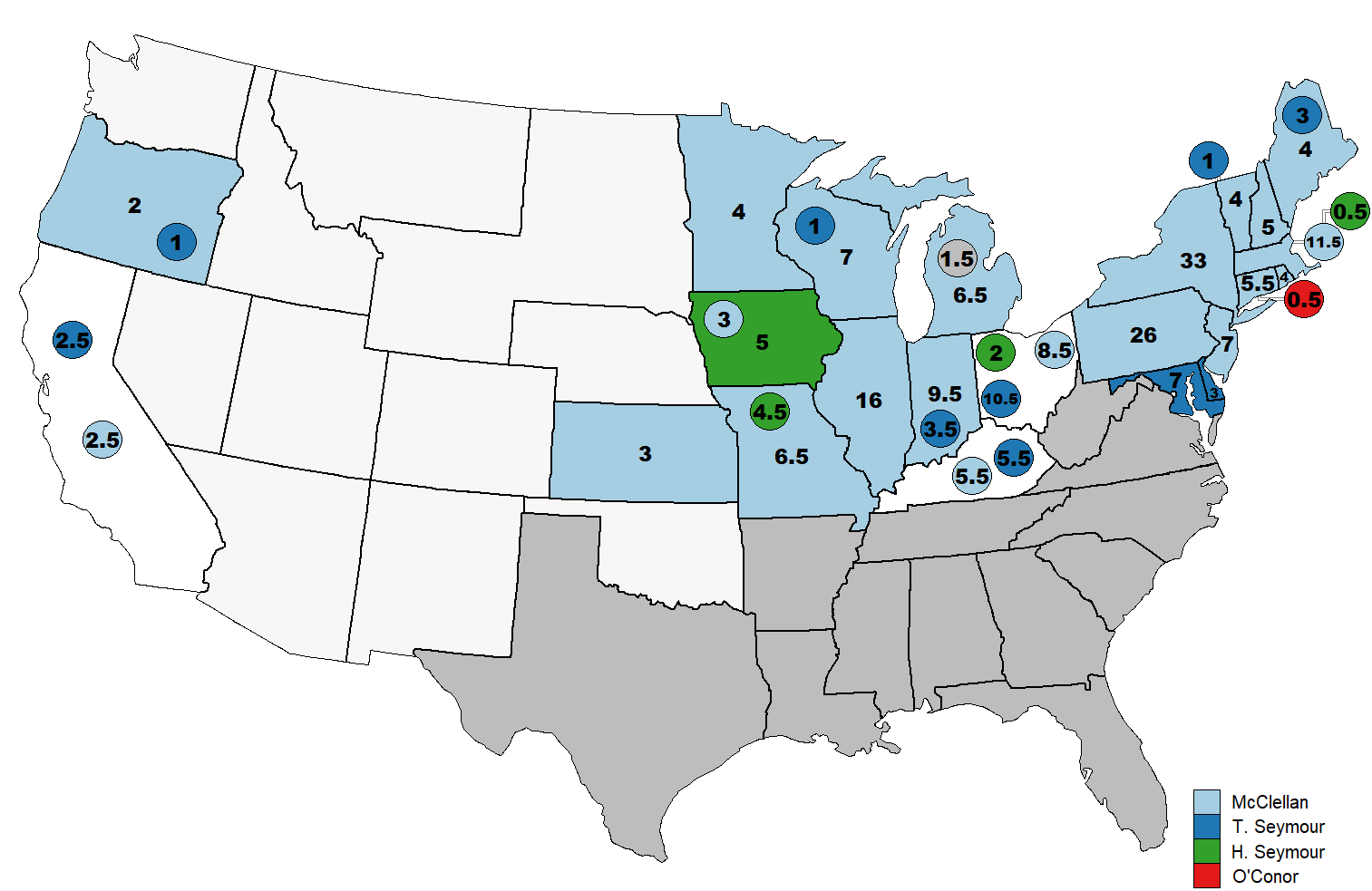
1st Ballot

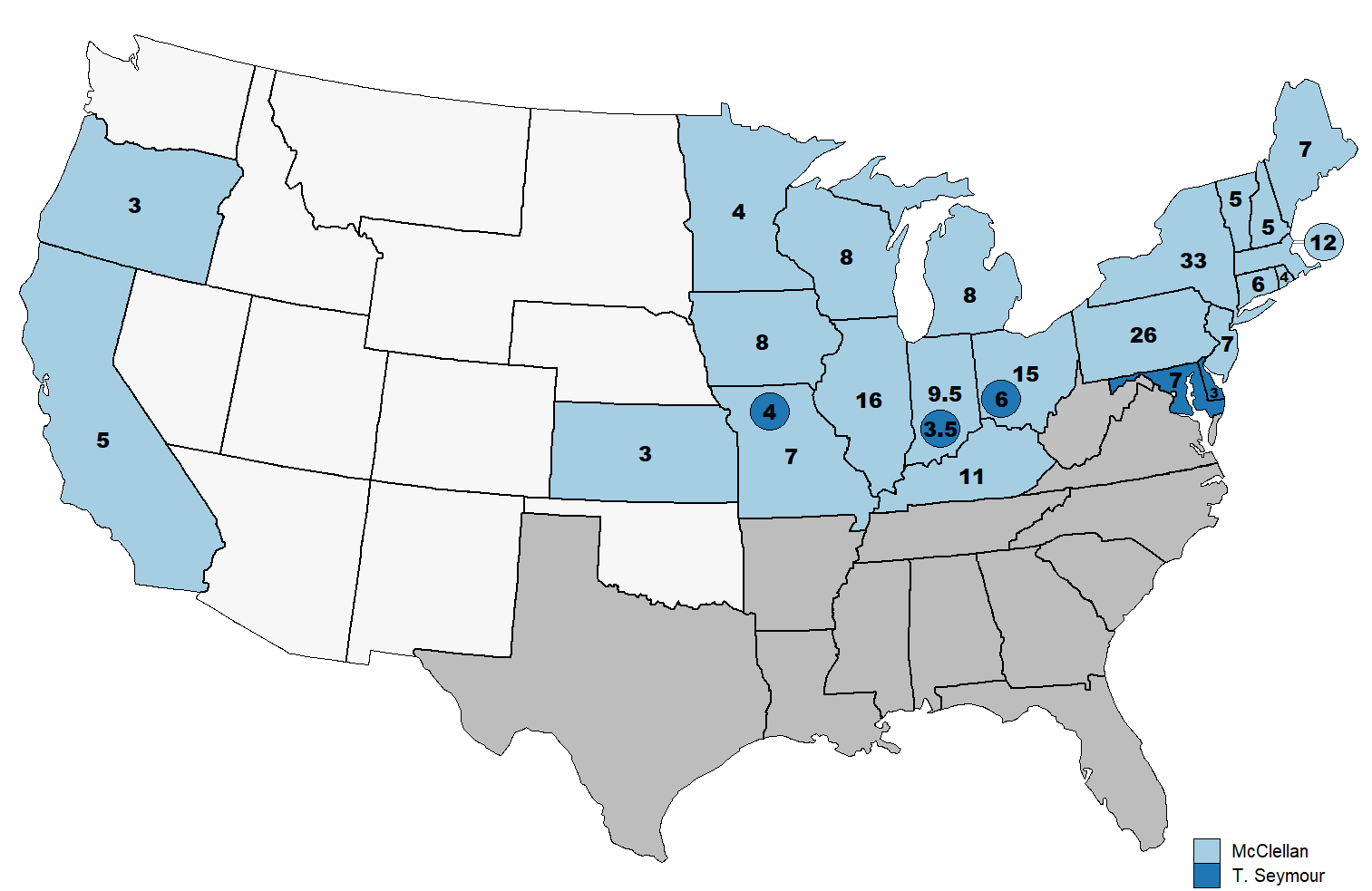
1st Ballot
(Revised)

== Vice presidential nomination ==
=== Vice presidential candidates ===
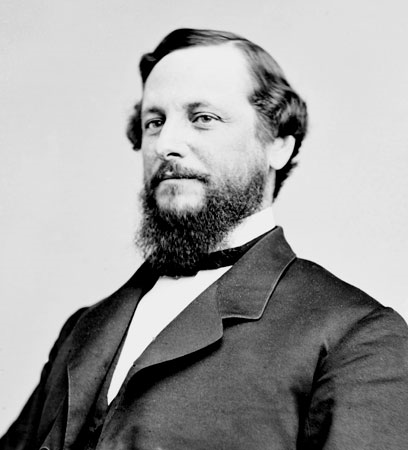
Representative
George H. Pendleton
of Ohio

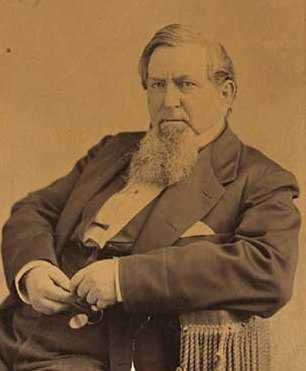
Railroad President George W. Cass
of Pennsylvania

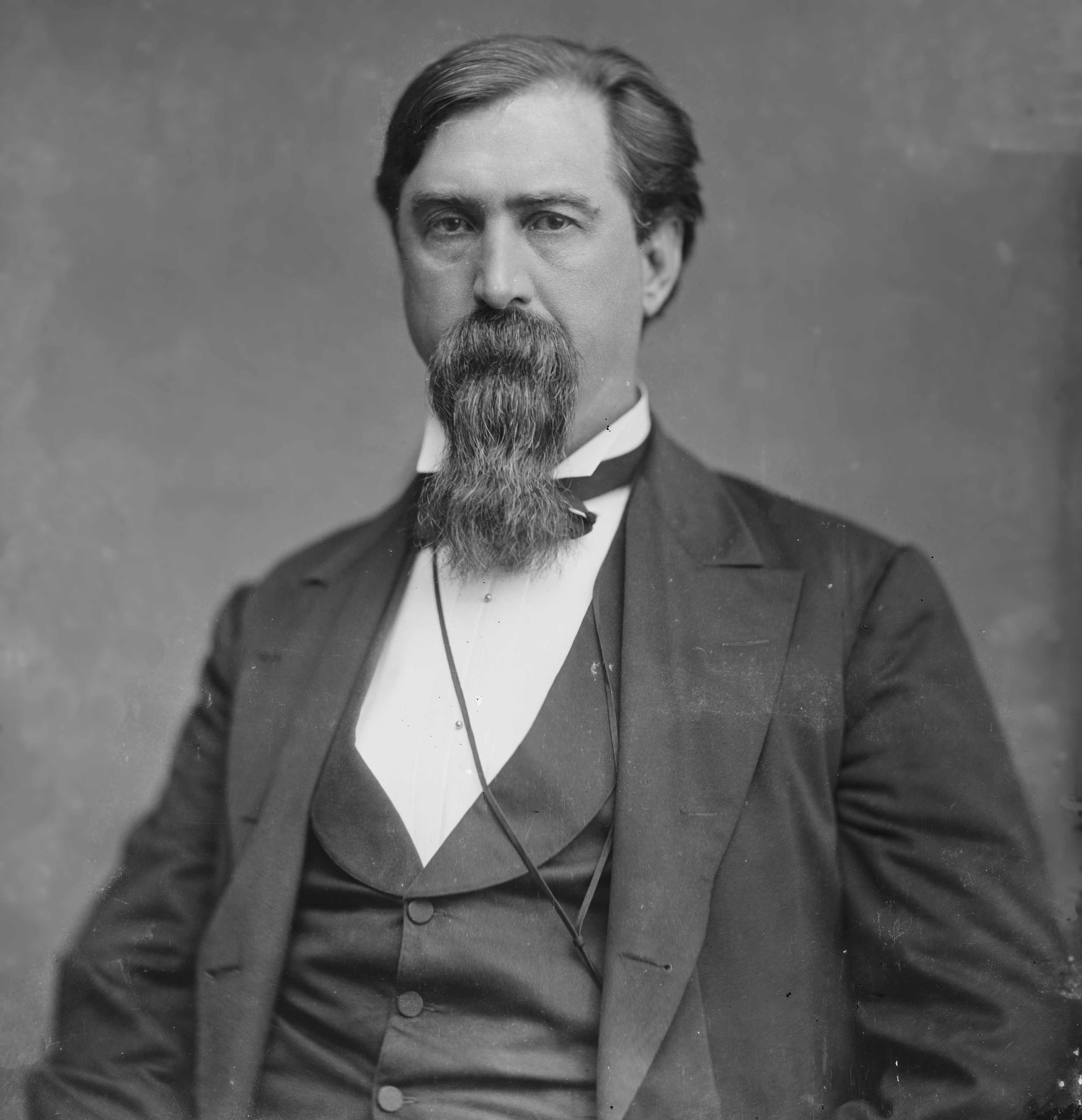
Representative
Daniel W. Voorhees
of Indiana

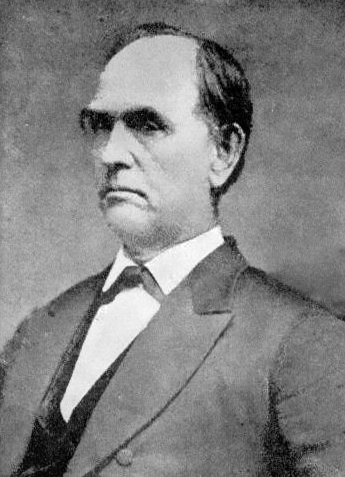
Former Senator Augustus C. Dodge
of Iowa

=== Declined ===
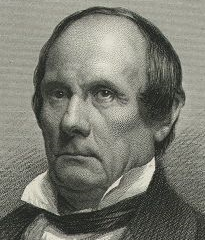
Former Treasury Secretary James Guthrie of Kentucky

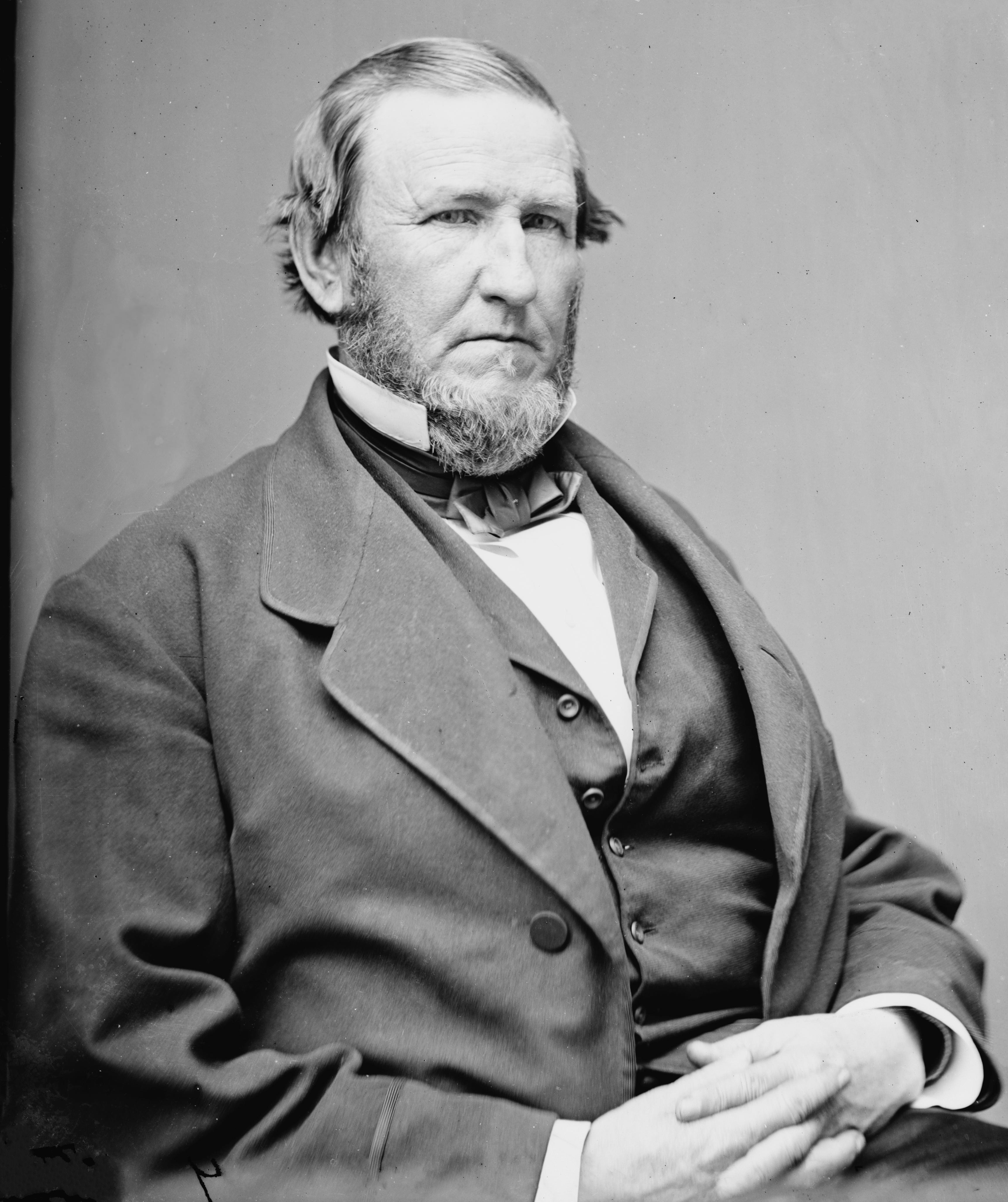
Senator
Lazarus W. Powell
of Kentucky

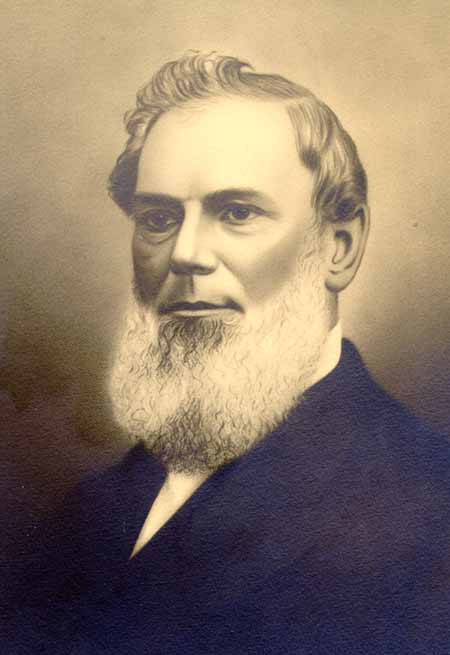
Former Chief Justice John D. Caton
of Illinois

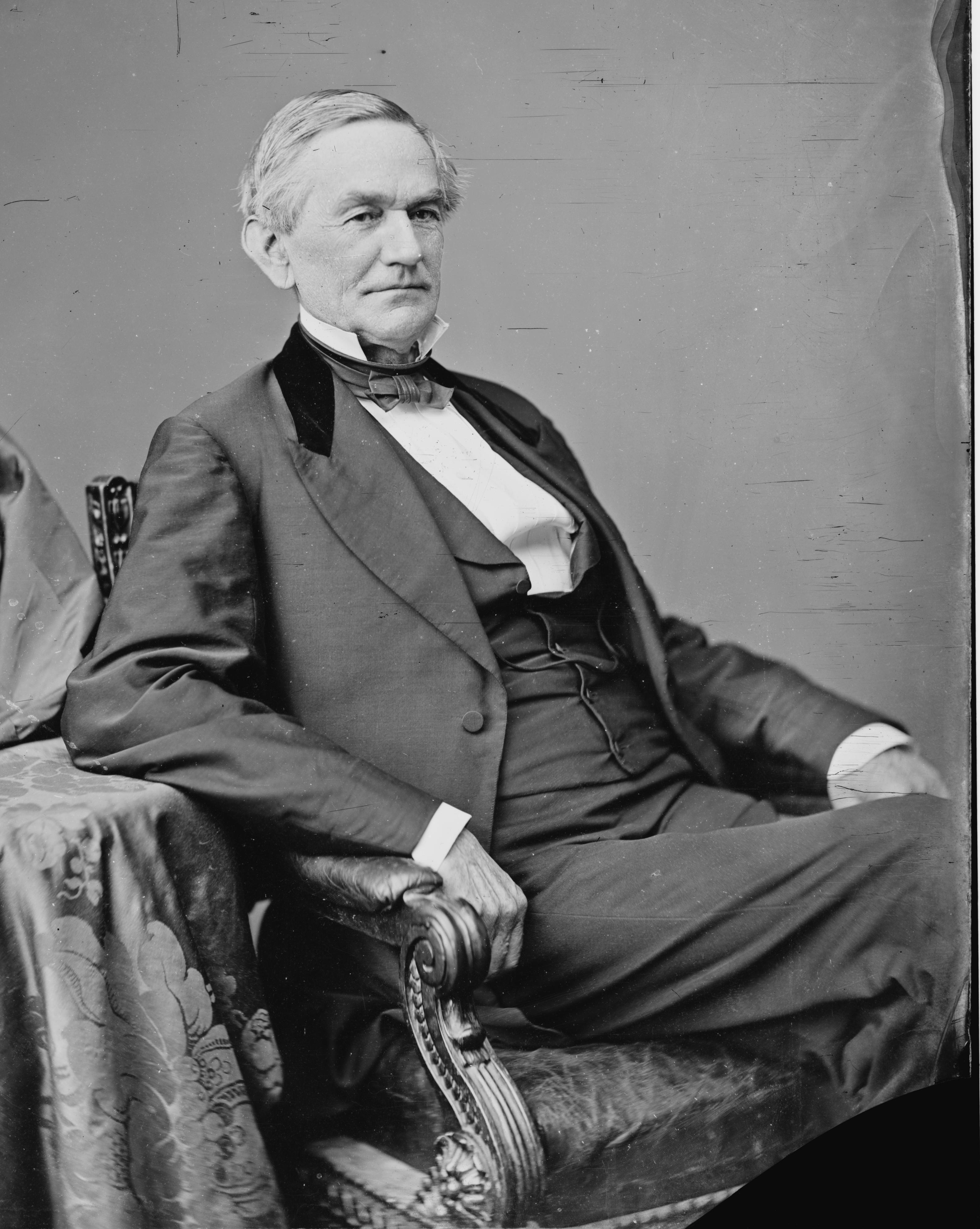
Former Representative John S. Phelps
of Missouri

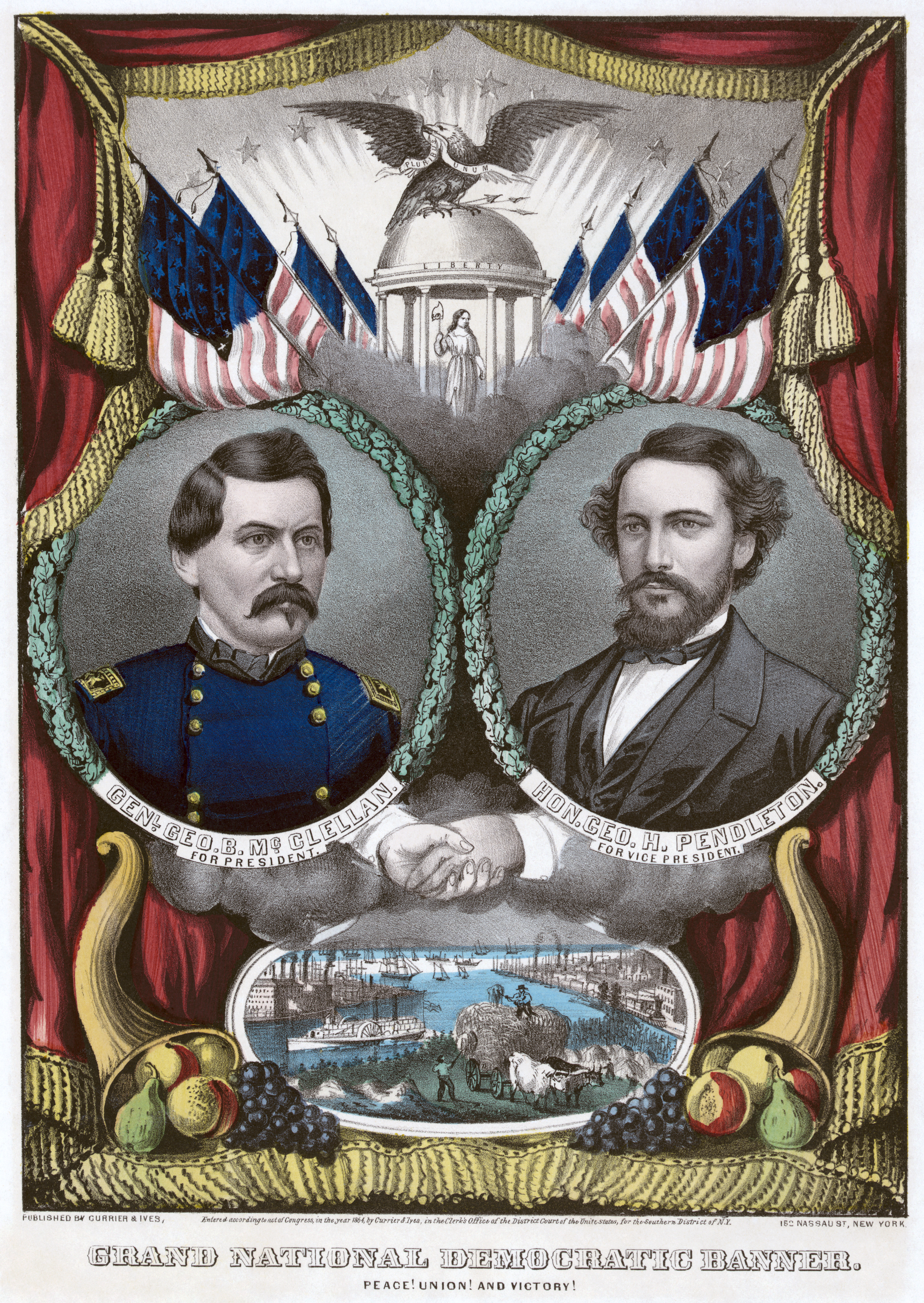
McClellan/Pendleton campaign poster

Eight names were placed in nomination: George H. Pendleton, James Guthrie, Lazarus W. Powell, George W. Cass, John D. Caton, Daniel W. Voorhees, Augustus C. Dodge, and John S. Phelps. Following the first ballot roll call, the names of Guthrie, Powell, Caton, and Phelps were withdrawn from consideration when it was revealed none of them desired the nomination. Before the first ballot could be finalized, 70 delegates who had supported one of the withdrawn candidates shifted their votes to Pendleton. As a result, Pendleton was supported by a majority of the delegates when the vote for the first ballot was finalized. With the exception of Pendleton, the remaining contenders were favorite son candidates who only had the support of their home states. During the second ballot roll call, each state recorded its vote for Pendleton.

Pendleton, a close associate of Vallandigham, was an Extreme Peace Democrat representative from the electoral-rich state of Ohio. Since the Democrats were divided by issues of war and peace, Pendleton's well-known rejection of the Lincoln administration's assertion of the constitutional right to coerce a state back into the Union balanced the ticket.

Vice Presidential Ballot
	1st (Before Shifts)	1st (After Shifts)	2nd
Pendleton	55.5	125.5	226
Guthrie	65.5	27	0
Powell	32.5	26	0
Cass	26	26	0
Caton	16	0	0
Voorhees	13	13	0
Dodge	9	8	0
Phelps	8	0	0
Not Voting	0.5	0.5	0

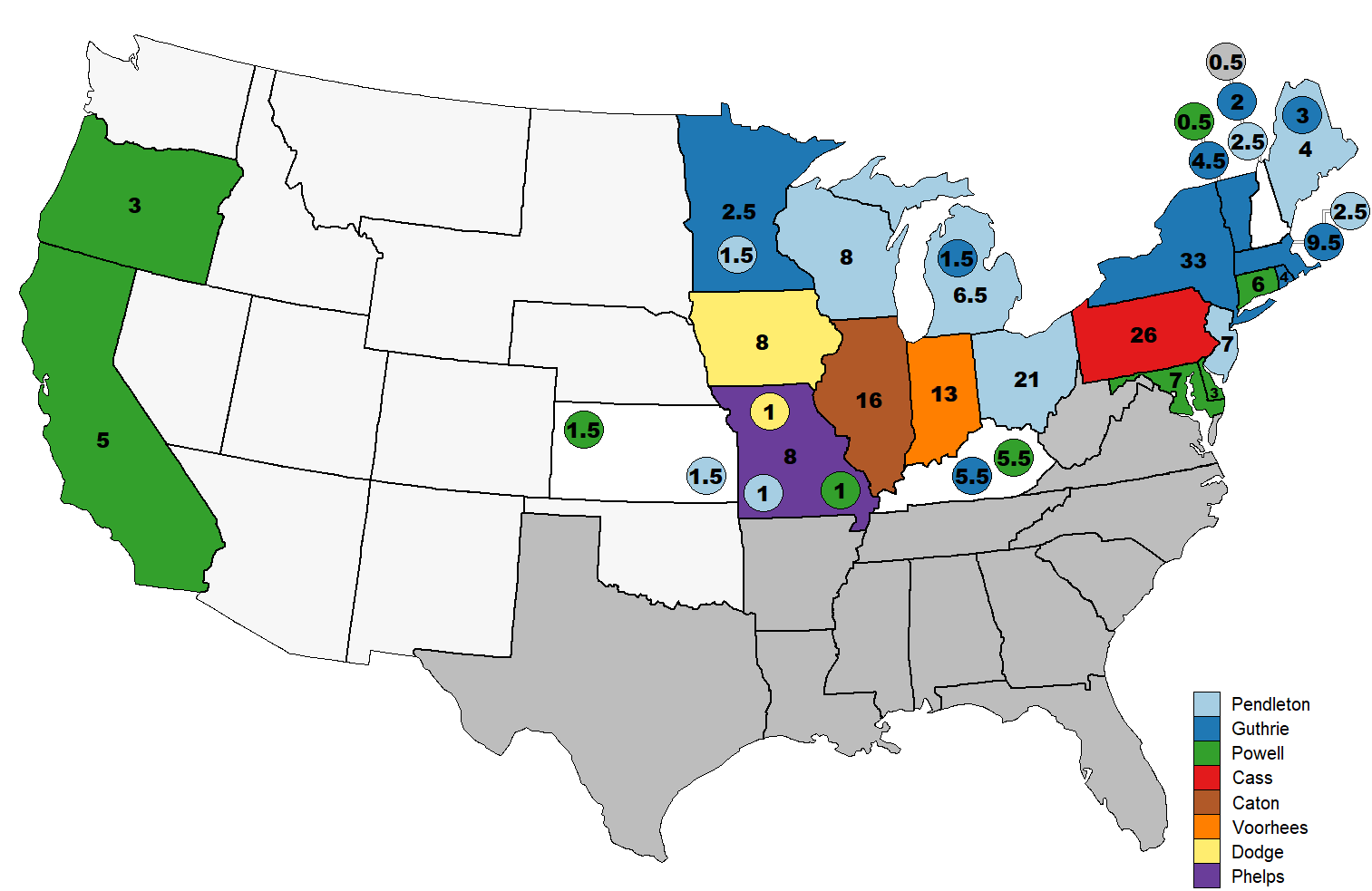
1st Ballot
(Before Shifts)

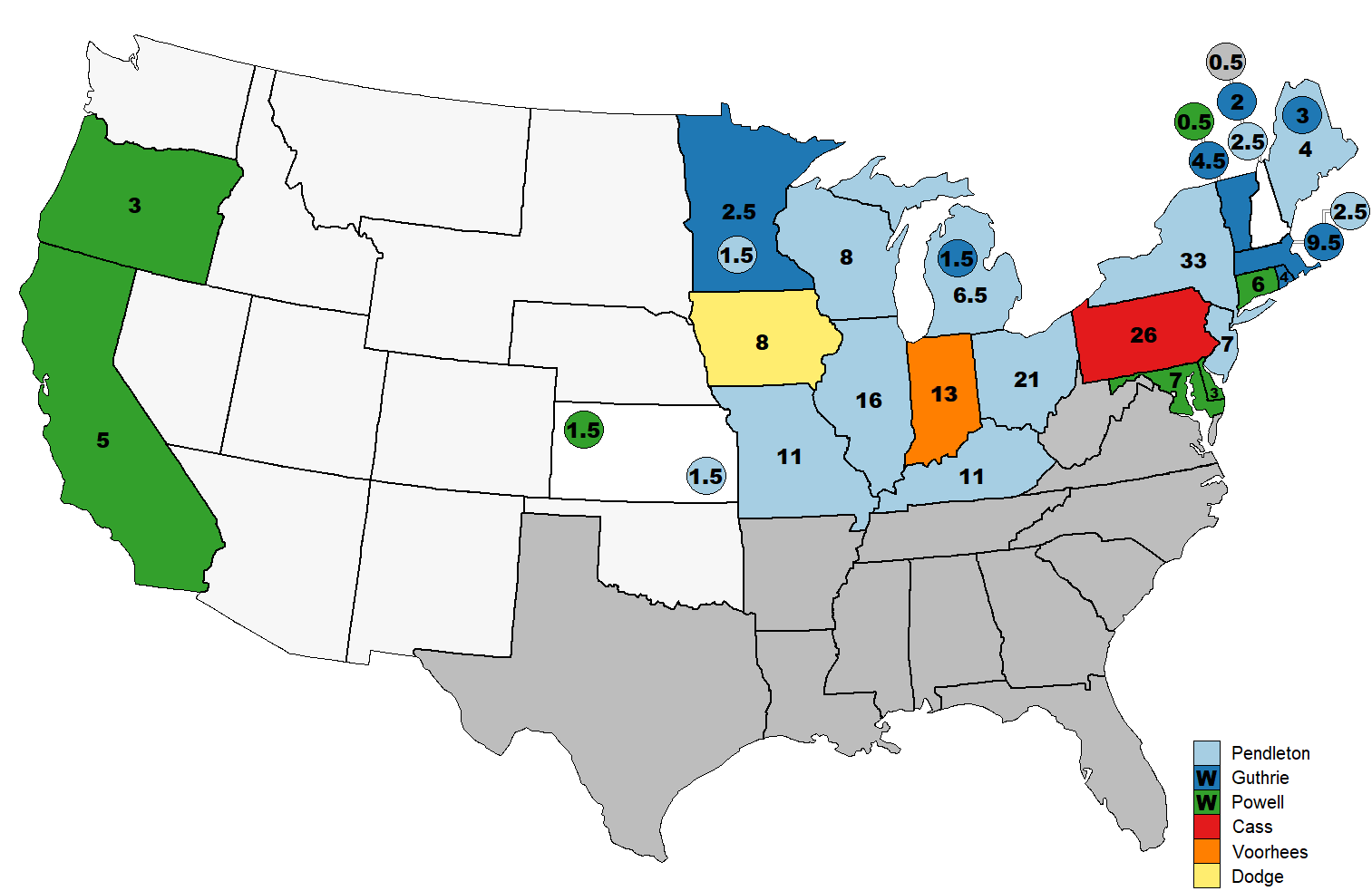
1st Ballot
(After Shifts)

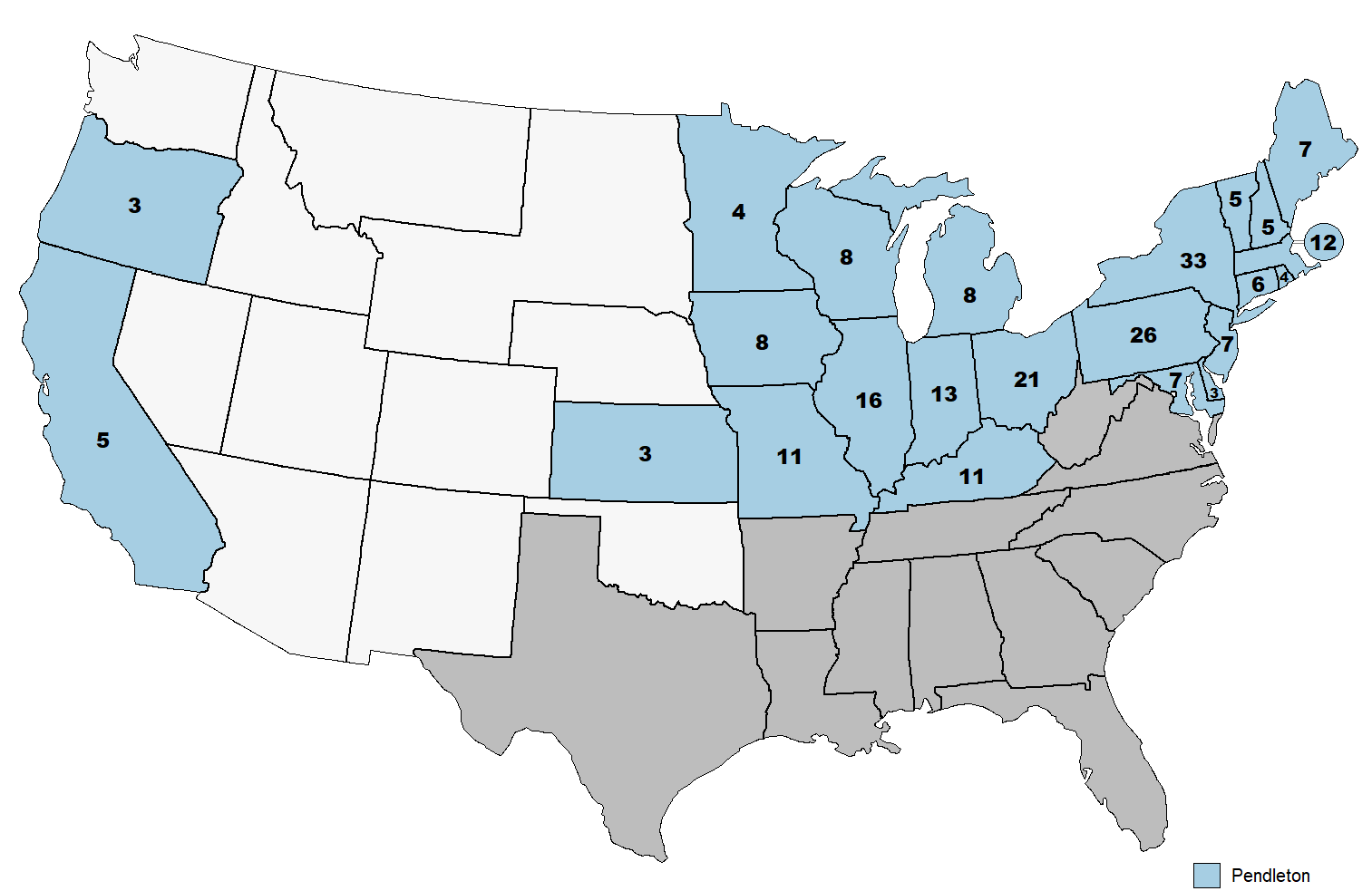
2nd Ballot

== See also ==
- History of the United States Democratic Party
- List of Democratic National Conventions
- U.S. presidential nomination convention
- 1864 Republican National Convention
- 1864 United States presidential election

Preceded by 1860; Charleston, South Carolina; Baltimore, Maryland	Democratic National Conventions	Succeeded by 1868; New York, New York
