= Chicago Democratic National Convention =

Chicago Democratic National Convention may refer to the following Democratic National Convention events:

- 1864 Democratic National Convention
- 1884 Democratic National Convention
- 1892 Democratic National Convention
- 1896 Democratic National Convention
- 1932 Democratic National Convention
- 1940 Democratic National Convention
- 1944 Democratic National Convention
- 1952 Democratic National Convention
- 1956 Democratic National Convention
- 1968 Democratic National Convention
  - 1968 Democratic National Convention protest activity
- 1996 Democratic National Convention
