= Favorite son =

Political term

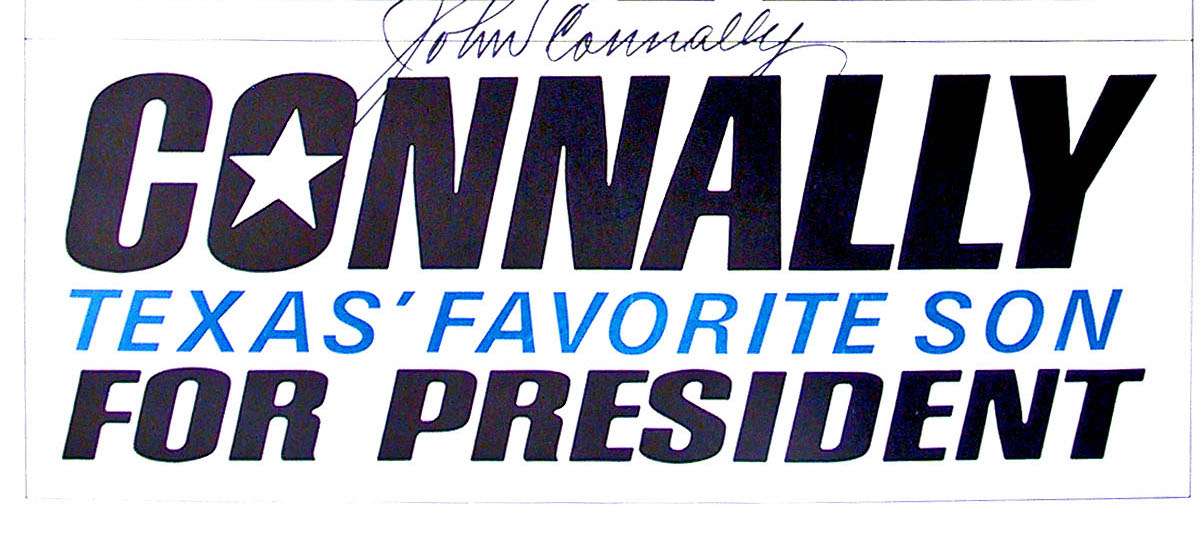
Favorite son banner from 1980 for John Connally

Favorite son (or favorite daughter) is a political term referring to a presidential candidate, either one that is nominated by a state but considered a nonviable candidate or a politician whose electoral appeal derives from their native state, rather than their political views. The technique was widely used in the 19th and early 20th centuries.

== Description ==
At the quadrennial American national political party conventions, a state delegation sometimes nominates a presidential candidate from the state—or less often from the state's region— who is not a viable candidate in the view of other delegations, and votes for this candidate in the initial ballot. The technique allows state leaders to negotiate with leading candidates in exchange for the delegation's support in subsequent ballots. The nominated individual is known as a favorite son or favorite daughter. The terms are also used for politicians whose electoral appeal derives from their native state, rather than their political views; for example, in the United States, a presidential candidate will usually win the support of their home state(s).

Serious candidates usually avoided campaigning in favorite sons' states. If a party's leader in a state—usually a governor or senator—was unsure of whom to support, supporting the favorite son could allow the state party to avoid disputes. Conversely, a party leader who has chosen a candidate might become a favorite son to keep other candidates' campaigns out of the state, demonstrate political leadership in the state, or prevent a rival local politician from becoming a favorite son. The favorite son may explicitly state that the candidacy is not viable, or that the favorite son is not a candidate at all. The favorite son may hope to receive the vice-presidential nomination, Cabinet post or other job, increase support for the favorite son's region or policies, or just the publicity from being nominated at the convention.

== History ==
The technique was widely used in the 19th and early 20th centuries. Sometimes it proved useful to emphasize a candidate's ties to multiple states, as in 1860's "Lincoln and Liberty" campaign song.

Since nationwide campaigns by candidates and binding primary elections have replaced brokered conventions, the technique has fallen out of use, as party rule changes in the early 1970s required candidates to have nominations from more than one state.

A particularly notable instance of a politician whose electoral appeal derives from their native state occurred in 1984, when challenger Walter Mondale lost 49 of 50 states against popular incumbent Ronald Reagan, winning only his home state of Minnesota and Washington, D.C.

== See also ==
- List of major-party United States presidential candidates who lost their home state
- Home state advantage

== Bibliography ==
- Elliot, Jeffrey M.; Ali, Sheikh R. (1 September 2007). The Presidential-Congressional Political Dictionary. Wildside Press LLC. ISBN 9781434492340 – via Google Books.
- Harris, Joseph P. (1961). California Politics (3rd ed.). Stanford University Press. ISBN 9780804709361 – via Google Books.
- Kamarck, Elaine C. (1 December 2009). Primary Politics: How Presidential Candidates Have Shaped the Modern Nominating System. Brookings Institution Press. p. 153 – via Internet Archive. "To further understand why modern nominating conventions are so dull, we need to look beyond the candidate-focus of the delegates: namely, to the fact that convention delegates elected to represent "uncommitted" or a favorite-son candidate have all but disappeared."
- Sabato, Larry J.; Ernst, Howard R. (14 May 2014). Encyclopedia of American Political Parties and Elections. Infobase Publishing. ISBN 9781438109947 – via Google Books.
- Safire, William (14 November 2017). Safire's Political Dictionary. Oxford University Press. ISBN 9780195343342 – via Google Books.
