= Home state advantage =

Belief that the candidate will receive more votes in their home state

Home state advantage, in electoral politics, and particularly in United States presidential elections, is the presumption that a candidate will receive a higher proportion of votes in their home state as compared to other states with similar population profiles.

The definition of a "home state" for purposes of such an advantage can be complicated by the fact that candidates may be born and raised in one state yet achieve political success in a different state before seeking national elected office. In some cases, a candidate may have gained recognition in multiple states before running for national office, such as 2016 Democratic nominee for president Hillary Clinton, who was born in Illinois, yet served as First Lady of Arkansas while her husband Bill Clinton was that state's governor from 1979 to 1981 and 1983 to 1992, and then served as the United States Senator for New York from 2001 to 2009.

While many successful candidates have won the presidency without winning their birth state, only four (James K. Polk, Woodrow Wilson, Richard Nixon, and Donald Trump) have been elected despite losing their state of residence at the time of the election. Polk and Trump are the only candidates to win the presidency while losing both the state of their birth and the state of their residence (Polk was born in North Carolina and resided in Tennessee, states he both lost; Trump was born and resided in New York in 2016 yet lost the state). Similarly, many losing presidential candidates have still managed to win their home state, even in elections that were otherwise landslide losses for them. For example, Walter Mondale won his home state of Minnesota in 1984, and no other state. By contrast, in 2000, Al Gore failed to win the popular vote in his home state, Tennessee, which both he and his father had represented in the Senate, making him the first major-party presidential candidate to have lost his home state since George McGovern lost South Dakota in 1972.

The perception that a home state advantage can deliver votes in an important state (particularly swing states) has also frequently influenced presidential nominees in the selection of a running mate.

== See also ==
- List of major-party United States presidential candidates who lost their home state
- Home (sports)
