= John D. Caton =

American judge

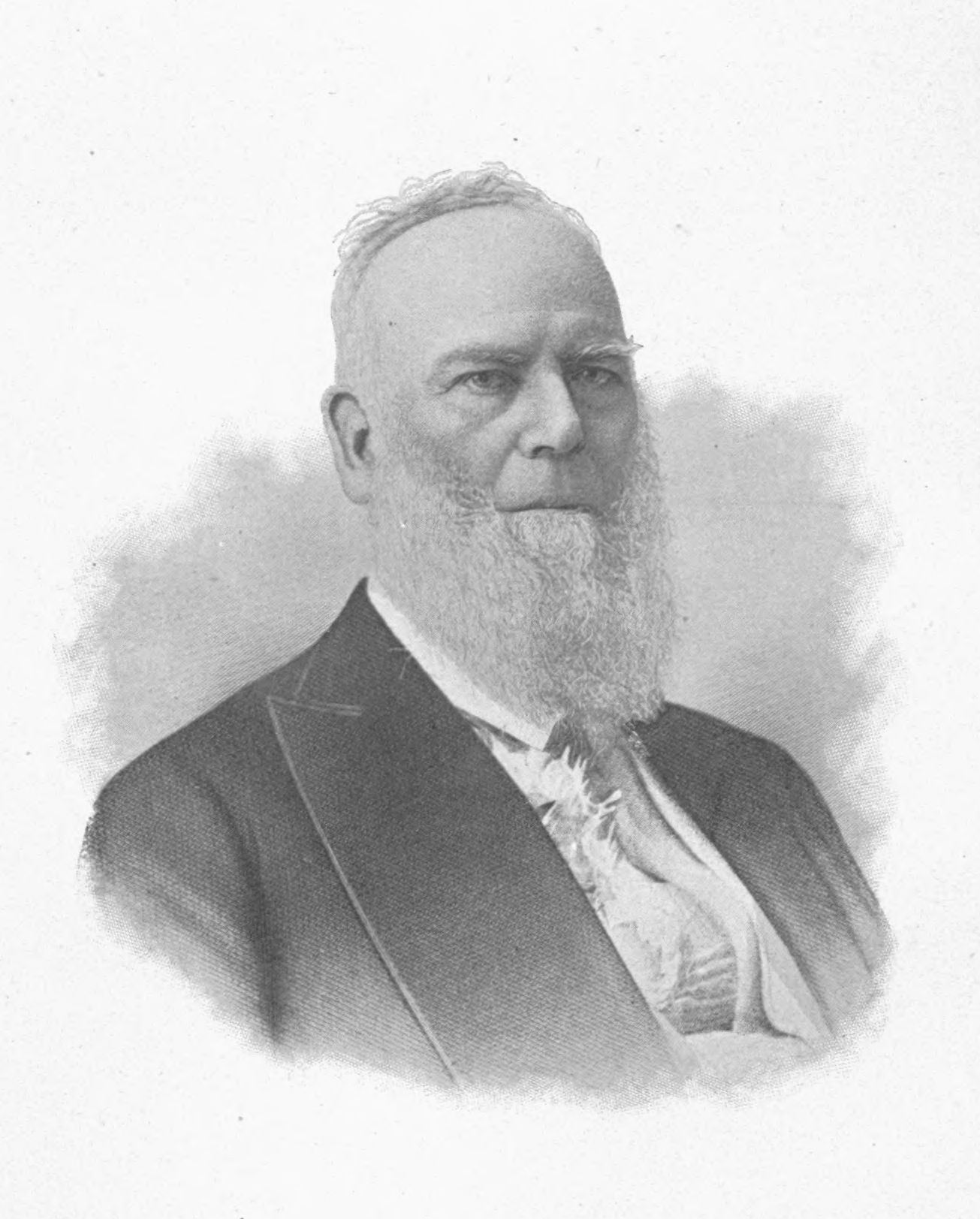
John D. Caton

John Dean Caton (March 19, 1812 – July 30, 1895) was an American associate justice and chief justice of the Illinois Supreme Court.

== Family, early life, education ==
Caton was born in a Quaker family in Monroe County, New York, on March 19, 1812. His father died when he was 3 years old and his mother then brought the family to her brother's farm near Utica, New York. The family managed to gather the money needed to send him to the Utica Academy. During his studies, he worked as a teacher in Utica. He studied law and civil engineering.

Later he married Laura A. Sheril; they had a son, Arthur Caton (1849/50–1904).

== Law practice ==
In 1833, Caton moved to Chicago, then a small town, and opened the first law office there with his partner, Giles Spring.

In his book, Early Bench and Bar of Illinois, inspired by an 1893 speech given to the Illinois Bar Association, Judge Caton claims to have tried the first jury case in a court of record in Cook County, Illinois. He recounts his experiences riding the circuit in the early days of Illinois statehood, and his later appointment to the Illinois Supreme Court, a period of some sixty years. He relates a number of humorous anecdotes about his days as a circuit rider.

Abraham Lincoln was an attorney in 214 cases in the Illinois Supreme Court in which Caton was a justice.

== Telegraph ==
Judge Caton was an early adopter of telegraph technology. As a young lawyer, he was asked by a Rochester, New York, friend, Henry O'Riley, and his friends in Ottawa to organize the Illinois and Mississippi Telegraph Company at a meeting in Peoria, Illinois. Caton was elected one of the directors of the new company and played an active role in getting the right of way for the erection of telegraph poles across the state. The Illinois and Mississippi Telegraph Company was a Morse patentee company that was a profitable and well-connected company on the western frontier after 1849. Caton and his Ottawa friends founded a telegraph instrument-making company in Ottawa, Illinois, initially staffed largely by German immigrant instrument makers. Caton Telegraph Instrument Company was a large-scale producer of high-quality instruments and was a major supplier of instruments in the Illinois and Mississippi Valleys. Ottawa was the seat of the third district of the Illinois Supreme Court where Judge Caton presided. Caton and his interest in the Illinois and Mississippi Telegraph Company owned north-south telegraph lines that were a significant monopoly that was eventually key to the success of the Rochester-based Western Union telegraph company's attempt to build a line to St. Louis and further west as the Illinois and Mississippi and Caton's own private telegraph companies had agreements with most of the railroads in Illinois. Eventually, Caton and his friends sold the telegraph lines to Western Union, and later, Caton sold his telegraph instrument manufacturing company located in Ottawa, Illinois, to Western Electric Company, which consolidated their Cleveland, Ohio manufacturing into the larger and more advanced facility in Ottawa after the Civil War in 1868. The Ottawa telegraph instrument designs, patents, and production methods were eventually consolidated into the post-1872 Chicago Western Electric facilities on Kinzie Avenue.

== Natural history and Darwin ==
By the late 1860s, his wealth allowed him to start studying natural history and traveling. He published several authoritative papers and books, among which The Antelope and Deer of America (1877).

He exchanged correspondence with Charles Darwin, who cited his work numerous times in The descent of man (1871). When Darwin's sons George and Francis visited the United States in 1871, he sent a letter of introduction with them to Caton.

Later, Caton also published books and papers on Hawaii, Norway, and on Illinois history.

== Publications ==
- (1863) The position and policy of the Democratic Party, letter to Gov. H. Seymour, New York Argus
- (1865) Death of Lincoln : proceedings in the Supreme Court of Illinois : presentation of the bar resolutions in regard to Mr. Lincoln's decease, Chicago, J.W. Middleton & Co., OCLC 228669573
- (1869) Origin of the prairies (read before the Ottawa Academy of Natural Sciences on December 30, 1869), Transactions of the Ottawa Academy of Natural Sciences, 30 p., OCLC 13725958
- (1870) Our courtship and our marriage : with incidents preceding and relating thereto, and observations suggested thereby : intended exclusively for our family, 280 p., OCLC 681902309
- (1870) The last of the Illinois, and a sketch of the Pottawatomies (read before the Chicago Historical Society on December 13, 1870), Chicago, ed. Rand, McNally & Co. (reedited 1876, Fergus Printing Co., Chicago), 36 p., OCLC 3623245
- (1875) A summer in Norway; with notes on the industries, habits, customs and peculiarities of the people, the history and institutions of the country,..., Chicago, ed. Jansen, McClurg & Co., 401 p. + 6 pl., OCLC 4139290
- (1877) The antelope and deer of America, Boston, ed. Houghton, Mifflin & Co. (revised edition in 1881), 426 p., OCLC 67402434
- (1880) Miscellanies, Houghton, Osgood & Co., 360 p.
- Shields, George Oliver (editor), with numerous contributors including Caton, John Dean. The Big game of North America. Its habits, habitat, haunts, and characteristics : how, when, and where to hunt it. Boston: Rand, McNally & Co. OCLC 67402434.
- (1893) Early bench and bar of Illinois, Chicago Legal News Company, 252 p., OCLC 3780983
- (1898) Argument favoring the annexation of Hawaii, 15 p., OCLC 857815883. This was part of the documents of reference for the Congress while debating the annexation of Hawaï between 1893 and 1898.

== See also ==
=== Bibliography ===
- Blanchard, Charles (1863), "Chief Justice Caton's Seymour letter", published in the Ottawa Republican on April 4 & 11, 1863, 12 p.
- Fergus, Robert (1882) Biographical sketch of John Dean Caton, ex-Chief-Justice of Illinois, Chicago, Fergus Printing Co., 48 p., OCLC 4715371
- Townley, Wayne C. (Wayne Carlyle) (1948) Two judges from Ottawa, McLean County Historical Society, vol. 7, Egypt Book House, 48 p. On John Dean Caton and Theophilas Lyle Dickey (1811-1885), Judges.
