= List of major-party United States presidential candidates who lost their home state =

Below is a list of major party United States presidential candidates who lost their birth or resident states. While many successful candidates have won the presidency without winning their birth state, only four (James K. Polk, Woodrow Wilson, Richard Nixon, and Donald Trump) have won an election despite losing their state of residence. Nixon, a lifelong Californian, had taken residence in New York after his failed run for governor of California, but later switched back during his presidency and ahead of his reelection.

== List of candidates ==
=== Won the presidential election ===
Election year	Name	Party	State of birth			State of residence		
Election year	Name	Party	State	Result	Margin	State	Result	Margin
1832	Andrew Jackson	Democratic	South Carolina	Lost	N/A	Tennessee	Won	90.84%
1840	William Henry Harrison	Whig	Virginia	Lost	–1.3%	Ohio	Won	8.53%
1844	James K. Polk	Democratic	North Carolina	Lost	–4.78%	Tennessee	Lost	–0.10%
1848	Zachary Taylor	Whig	Virginia	Lost	–1.60%	Louisiana	Won	9.18%
1860	Abraham Lincoln	Republican	Kentucky	Lost	–44.3%	Illinois	Won	3.5%
1864	Abraham Lincoln	Republican	Kentucky	Lost	–39.6%	Illinois	Won	8.8%
1916	Woodrow Wilson	Democratic	Virginia	Won	35.16%	New Jersey	Lost	–11.72%
1968	Richard Nixon	Republican	California	Won	3.08%	New York	Lost	–5.46%
1988	George H. W. Bush	Republican	Massachusetts	Lost	–7.85%	Texas	Won	12.60%
2000	George W. Bush	Republican	Connecticut	Lost	–17.47%	Texas	Won	21.32%
2004	George W. Bush	Republican	Connecticut	Lost	–10.36%	Texas	Won	22.87%
2016	Donald Trump	Republican	New York	Lost	−22.49%	New York	Lost	−22.49%
2024	Donald Trump	Republican	New York	Lost	-12.6%	Florida	Won	13.1%

=== Lost the presidential election ===
Only candidates who won at least one state (most of them not having necessarily won their birth states and most of the others not having necessarily won their resident states) in the general elections are listed here.

Name	Election year	Party	State of birth	State of residency
Charles Cotesworth Pinckney	1804	Federalist	Lost South Carolina	
Charles Cotesworth Pinckney	1808	Federalist	Lost South Carolina	
Rufus King	1816	Federalist	Won Massachusetts	Lost New York
Henry Clay	1824	Democratic-Republican	Lost Virginia	Won Kentucky
Henry Clay	1832	National Republican	Lost Virginia	Won Kentucky
William Wirt	1832	Anti-Masonic	Lost Maryland	
John Floyd	1832	Nullifier	Lost Kentucky	Lost Virginia
William Henry Harrison	1836	Whig	Lost Virginia	Won Ohio
Hugh Lawson White	1836	Whig	Lost North Carolina	Won Tennessee
Daniel Webster	1836	Whig	Lost New Hampshire	Won Massachusetts
Willie Person Mangum	1836	Whig	Lost North Carolina	
Martin Van Buren	1840	Democratic	Lost New York	
Henry Clay	1844	Whig	Lost Virginia	Won Kentucky
Winfield Scott	1852	Whig	Lost Virginia	Lost New Jersey
John C. Frémont	1856	Republican	Lost Georgia	Lost California
Millard Fillmore	1856	Know-Nothing	Lost New York	
Stephen A. Douglas	1860	Northern Democratic	Lost Vermont	Lost Illinois
John C. Breckinridge	1860	Southern Democratic	Lost Kentucky	
George B. McClellan	1864	Democratic	Lost Pennsylvania	Won New Jersey
Horace Greeley	1872	Liberal Republican; Democratic	Lost New Hampshire	Lost New York
Winfield Scott Hancock	1880	Democratic	Lost Pennsylvania	
Grover Cleveland	1888	Democratic	Won New Jersey	Lost New York
Benjamin Harrison	1892	Republican	Won Ohio	Lost Indiana
James B. Weaver	1892	Populist	Lost Ohio	Lost Iowa
William Jennings Bryan	1896	Democratic-Populist	Lost Illinois	Won Nebraska
William Jennings Bryan	1900	Democratic-Populist	Lost Illinois	Lost Nebraska
Alton B. Parker	1904	Democratic	Lost New York	
William Jennings Bryan	1908	Democratic	Lost Illinois	Won Nebraska
Theodore Roosevelt	1912	Progressive	Lost New York	
William Howard Taft	1912	Republican	Lost Ohio	
James M. Cox	1920	Democratic	Lost Ohio	
John W. Davis	1924	Democratic	Lost West Virginia	
Al Smith	1928	Democratic	Lost New York	
Herbert Hoover	1932	Republican	Lost Iowa	Lost California
Alf Landon	1936	Republican	Lost Pennsylvania	Lost Kansas
Wendell Willkie	1940	Republican	Won Indiana	Lost New York
Thomas E. Dewey	1944	Republican	Lost Michigan	Lost New York
Adlai Stevenson	1952	Democratic	Lost California	Lost Illinois
Adlai Stevenson	1956	Democratic	Lost California	Lost Illinois
Hubert Humphrey	1968	Democratic	Lost South Dakota	Won Minnesota
George McGovern	1972	Democratic	Lost South Dakota	
George H. W. Bush	1992	Republican	Lost Massachusetts	Won Texas
Al Gore	2000	Democratic	Won District of Columbia	Lost Tennessee
John Kerry	2004	Democratic	Lost Colorado	Won Massachusetts
Mitt Romney	2012	Republican	Lost Michigan	Lost Massachusetts
Donald Trump	2020	Republican	Lost New York	Won Florida

=== Lost the home states of their running mates ===
- In 1796, John Adams lost South Carolina, the home state of his running mate Thomas Pinckney. Thomas Jefferson lost New York, the home state of his running mate Aaron Burr as well as Burr's birth state of New Jersey.
- In 1800, Thomas Jefferson lost New Jersey, the birth state of his running mate Aaron Burr. John Adams lost South Carolina, the home state of his running mate Charles Cotesworth Pinckney.
- In 1804, Charles Cotesworth Pinckney lost New York, the home state of his running mate Rufus King, as well as King's birth state of Massachusetts.
- In 1808, Charles Cotesworth Pinckney lost New York, the home state of his running mate Rufus King.
- In 1812, James Madison lost Massachusetts, the home state of his running mate Elbridge Gerry. DeWitt Clinton lost Pennsylvania, the home state of his running mate Jared Ingersoll.
- In 1816, Rufus King lost Maryland, the home state of his running mate John Eager Howard.
- In 1824, John Quincy Adams lost South Carolina, the home state of his running mate John C. Calhoun. Henry Clay lost New York, the home state of his running mate Nathan Sanford. William H. Crawford lost North Carolina, the home state of his running mate Nathaniel Macon.
- In 1828, John Quincy Adams lost Pennsylvania, the home state of his running mate Richard Rush.
- In 1832, Henry Clay lost Pennsylvania, the home state of his running mate John Sergeant. William Wirt lost Pennsylvania, the home state of his running mate Amos Ellmaker. John Floyd lost Massachusetts, the home state of his running mate Henry Lee.
- In 1836, Martin Van Buren lost Kentucky, the home state of his running mate Richard Mentor Johnson. William Henry Harrison and Daniel Webster both lost New York, the home state of their mutual running mate Francis Granger, as well as Granger's birth state of Connecticut. Hugh Lawson White and Willie Person Mangum both lost Virginia, the home state of their mutual running mate John Tyler.
- In 1840, William Henry Harrison lost Virginia, the home state of his running mate John Tyler.
- In 1844, Henry Clay lost New York, the home state of his running mate Theodore Frelinghuysen.
- In 1848, Lewis Cass lost Kentucky, the home state of his running mate William Orlando Butler.
- In 1852, Winfield Scott lost North Carolina, the home state of his running mate William Alexander Graham.
- In 1856, John C. Frémont lost New Jersey, the home state of his running mate William L. Dayton. Millard Fillmore lost Tennessee, the home state of his running mate Andrew Jackson Donelson.
- In 1860, Stephen A. Douglas lost Georgia, the home state of his running mate Herschel Vespasian Johnson. John C. Breckinridge lost Oregon, the home state of his running mate Joseph Lane. John Bell lost Massachusetts, the home state of his running mate Edward Everett.
- In 1864, George B. McClellan lost Ohio, the home state of his running mate George H. Pendleton. In addition, due to the American Civil War, Abraham Lincoln did not receive any votes in North Carolina, the birth state of his running mate Andrew Johnson.
- In 1868, Ulysses S. Grant lost New York, the birth state of his running mate Schuyler Colfax. Horatio Seymour lost Missouri, the home state of his running mate Francis Preston Blair Jr.
- In 1876, Rutherford B. Hayes lost New York, the home state of his running mate William A. Wheeler. Samuel J. Tilden lost Ohio, the birth state of his running mate Thomas A. Hendricks.
- In 1880, Winfield Scott Hancock lost Indiana, the home state of his running mate William Hayden English.
- In 1884, Grover Cleveland lost Ohio, the birth state of his running mate Thomas A. Hendricks.
- In 1888, Grover Cleveland lost Ohio, the home state of his running mate Allen G. Thurman.
- In 1892, Benjamin Harrison lost New York, the home state of his running mate Whitelaw Reid. James B. Weaver lost Virginia, the home state of his running mate James G. Field.
- In 1896, William Jennings Bryan lost Maine, the home state of his running mate Arthur Sewall.
- In 1900, William Jennings Bryan lost Illinois, the home state of his running mate Adlai Stevenson I.
- In 1904, Alton B. Parker lost West Virginia, the home state of his running mate Henry Gassaway Davis, as well as Davis' birth state of Maryland.
- In 1908, William Jennings Bryan lost Indiana, the home state of his running mate John W. Kern.
- In 1912, William Howard Taft lost New York, the home state of his running mate Nicholas Murray Butler.
- In 1916, Woodrow Wilson lost Indiana, the home state of his running mate Thomas R. Marshall. Charles Evans Hughes lost Ohio, the birth state of his running mate Charles W. Fairbanks.
- In 1920, James M. Cox lost New York, the home state of his running mate Franklin D. Roosevelt.
- In 1924, John W. Davis lost Nebraska, the home state of his running mate Charles W. Bryan, as well as Bryan's birth state of Illinois. Robert M. La Follette lost Montana, the home state of his running mate Burton K. Wheeler, as well as Wheeler's birth state of Massachusetts.
- In 1932, Herbert Hoover lost Kansas, the home state of his running mate Charles Curtis.
- In 1936, Alf Landon lost Illinois, the home state of his running mate Frank Knox, as well as Knox's birth state of Massachusetts.
- In 1940, Franklin D. Roosevelt lost Iowa, the home state of his running mate Henry A. Wallace. Wendell Willkie lost Oregon, the home state of his running mate Charles L. McNary.
- In 1948, Thomas E. Dewey lost California, the home state of his running mate Earl Warren.
- In 1956, Adlai Stevenson II lost Tennessee, the home state of his running mate Estes Kefauver.
- In 1960, Richard Nixon lost Massachusetts, the home state of his running mate Henry Cabot Lodge Jr.
- In 1964, Barry Goldwater lost New York, the home state of his running mate William E. Miller.
- In 1968, Richard Nixon lost Maryland, the home state of his running mate Spiro Agnew. George Wallace lost California, the home state of his running mate Curtis LeMay, as well as LeMay's birth state of Ohio.
- In 1972, George McGovern lost Maryland, the home state of his running mate Sargent Shriver.
- In 1984, Walter Mondale lost New York, the home state of his running mate Geraldine Ferraro.
- In 1988, Michael Dukakis lost Texas, the home state of his running mate Lloyd Bentsen.
- In 1996, Bob Dole lost New York, the home state of his running mate Jack Kemp, as well as Kemp's birth state of California.
- In 2004, John Kerry lost North Carolina, the home state of his running mate John Edwards, as well as Edwards' birth state of South Carolina.
- In 2012, Mitt Romney lost Wisconsin, the home state of his running mate Paul Ryan.
- In 2024, Kamala Harris lost Nebraska, the birth state of her running mate Tim Walz, including his birth congressional district.

== See also ==
- President of the United States
