= Clay Local School District =

School district in Ohio, United States

Address
- 44 Clay High Street Portsmouth, Ohio; United States
- Coordinates: 38°47′32″N 82°58′6″W

District information
- Type: (Ohio) public, rural, school district
- Motto: "Cognitiones Artes Habitus Virtutes"
- Grades: K–12
- Established: 1940; 86 years ago
- Superintendent: W. Todd Warnock

Students and staff
- Students: 717 (as of 2018)
- Faculty: 40
- Athletic conference: Southern Ohio Conference—Division I
- District mascot: Panthers
- Colors: Royal Blue and Gold

Other information
- Website: www.claylocalschools.org

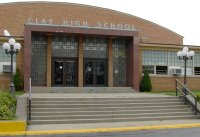
Clay Junior–Senior High School, opened in 1956 at a cost of $600,000. The main building no longer exists. Some of it was incorporated into the new PK–12 building.

The Clay Local School District (CLSD) is located four miles (6.4 km) north of the Portsmouth, Ohio, city limits on U.S. Route 23 in Clay Township in Scioto County—which is 85 miles (137 km) south of Columbus, Ohio; 50 miles (80 km) west of Huntington, West Virginia; and 100 miles (160 km) east of Cincinnati, Ohio. Clay is a rural Ohio public school district serving 700 students in grades pre-K through 12 in Southern Ohio. With the creation of a high school (Clay Township High School) for the district in 1940, students for the first time were able to graduate from a Clay Local School District building.

In 2010 a new PK-12 building was constructed. Until 2010, Clay Junior–Senior High School was one of three buildings used in the district. Rubyville Elementary School (4–6), on Maple Benner Road at the intersection of State Route 139, and Rosemount Primary School (K–3), on Rose Valley Road just off Rosemount Road in Rosemount, Ohio, were the other two buildings.

== General information ==
The enrollment for Clay Local School District, K–12, is 700+ with 350 students in the elementary grades (K–6) and 350 students in grades seven through twelve. The district's mascot is the black panther while the district's colors are royal blue and gold. Ninety-six (96.22) percent of the students that attend the district are white. The other four percent are Hispanic (1.15), African American (.82), multiracial (.82), Asian (.66), or American Indian (.33). The district covers 22.12 square miles (57.3 km^{2}). There are forty full-time faculty members serving the 700 students. The athletes compete in the small division in every Ohio High School Athletic Association (OHSAA) sport. The school competes with ten (12) sports teams at the high school level and five at the junior high level. The school district belongs to the OHSAA and to the Southern Ohio Conference-Division I.

The district received communication from the Ohio School Facilities Commission on May 3, 2007, that the district had been approved for the state funds. After new Ohio legislation allowing the district to proceed, a bond issue was placed on the March 2008 ballot to build a new pre-K–12 facility. The ballot issue passed and the district is in the process of building a new facility. The actual groundbreaking occurred in the Spring of 2009.

== Brief history ==
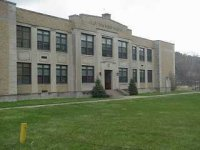
Rubyville Elementary (served as Clay High School from 1940 to 1956). The Clay Township High School was built as part of the Federal Emergency Administration of Public Works under President Franklin D. Roosevelt. At the time Harold L. Ickes was the administrator of the Public Works program. The building no longer exists.

The Clay Local School District was created in 1940 to serve the residents of Clay Township and the individual communities of Eden Park, Rosemount, Rubyville, and Twin Valley. For those students who desired to go on to high school before the opening of the high school in 1940, the board of education provided their tuition to Glenwood High School or to Portsmouth High School. "There were buses to transport students to and from school, but there was no cafeteria, therefore, students brought their lunches." The first graduating class in 1940 was nicknamed the "Dirty Dozen" because there were twelve students that walked across the stage for the first time as Clay graduates.

The district began with four buildings—one high school and three elementary schools. There were two buildings in Rubyville—the former Rubyville Elementary building, which served as the high school from 1940 to 1956, and an elementary building (originally Sumers, later renamed Long Run School), which is now a local church. The district also had an elementary building in Eden Park, which still stands but is no longer used by the district, and one in Rosemount (Scioto Trail School), which was located on the current site of JW Village Market.

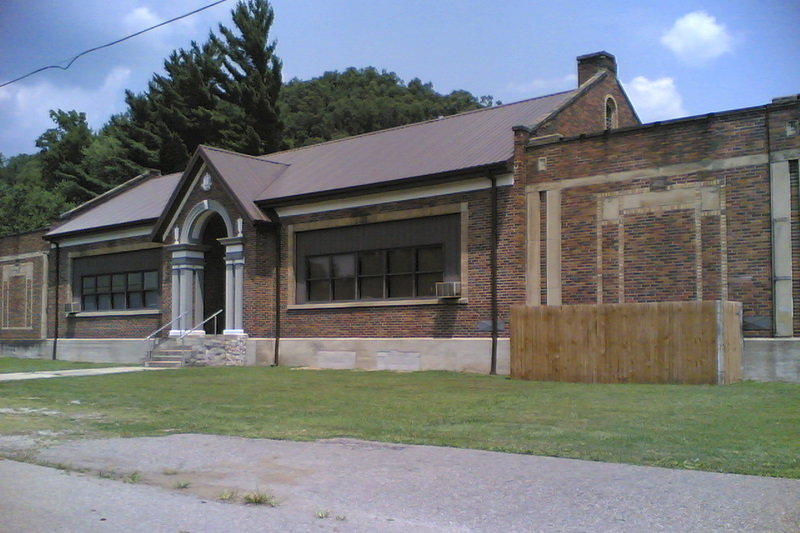
The former Eden Park Elementary School

In 1956, the Rubyville building (built in 1939) became the elementary building. With a bond issue to raise $325,000 (along with matching funds for a total cost of nearly $600,000) a new high school building, which opened its doors on February 1, 1956, was built on Clay High Street. Mr. Carl Bandy was the Executive Head of the Clay (Rural) Local School District when the high school was built in 1955. At that time, the enrollment of the district was 719. One year later, it was 915. During the period of peak employment at the Atomic Plant in Piketon (now U.S.E.C.), the enrollment was 1100. A new elementary building was then built in Rosemount (Rosemount Primary, built in 1964).

The district no longer uses these three buildings. In 1964 the Rosemount building was constructed, and a band room and junior high wing were added to the high school. In 1998 an additional wing was built on to the high school structure. Additional upgrades and renovations have occurred to all three buildings over the years including improvements to the high school gym, new science laboratories, renovations to all the restroom facilities, new roofs, and air conditioning for all three buildings. The enrollment for the district is currently 700.

- Clay Local School District

44 Clay High Street, Portsmouth, OH 45662

740.354.6645 / 740.354.5746 (fax)

== Academics ==
Academically, Clay has a reputation as one of the better schools in Southern Ohio. The latest Ohio Department of Education report card indicated CHS met the graduation, AYP (average yearly progress), and attendance percentages/rates.

=== District Profile ===
http://clay.k12.oh.us/info-and-links/district-profile

=== Clay Jr.–Sr. High School (7–12) ===
The school year is divided into two semesters for grading and course scheduling purposes, with a three-day finals schedule at the end of the year (see Academic term). The majority of the courses offered are year-long courses, but students have the opportunity to take a few courses on a semester basis. The school meets on a 47-minute, seven-period schedule in which students attend each class daily. Different schedules have been used over the years including a nine-period day, in which two days a month operated on an activity schedule. The 30-minute time period on these days were set aside to allow for curricular and extracurricular clubs to meet that would not otherwise fit into either the regular school day or after school because of scheduling.

While student enrollment (350) and class sizes are small (17:1), Clay offers many opportunities for its students including both curricular and extracurricular activities. These academic opportunities include, but are not limited to, AP courses, Art I–IV, band, Chemistry I and II, chorus, computer applications, pre-engineering courses, economics, physics, Spanish I–IV, and web page design.

Recent graduates of CHS have attended/graduated from such universities/colleges as Berea College, Cornell University, Eastern Kentucky University, Marshall University, Miami University, Morehead State University, Northern Kentucky University, Ohio University, Ohio Northern University, Purdue University, Shawnee State University, Ohio State University, Transylvania University, University of Cincinnati, University of Kentucky, Valparaiso University, St. Bonaventure University, University of Dayton, West Point, Wittenberg University, and Wright State University. Clay's graduating classes, which average about 35 students, have received in excess of $300,000 each year in scholarship money. The 2007 Clay graduating class, for example, was offered close to $450,000 in scholarships.

Likewise, the CHS staff members have also attended/graduated from many of these same institutions. The CHS staff members have an average of 16 years of educational experience.

=== Rubyville Elementary (4–6) ===
Rubyville Elementary School is one of two former elementary schools in the Clay Local School District. Rubyville Elementary (a.k.a. Rubyville) served students in grades four through six. The building was located on Maple Benner Road at the intersection of Ohio State Route 139 in Scioto County. The building no longer exists.

=== Rosemount Primary (K–3) ===
Rosemount Primary School is the other former elementary building in the district. It was located on Rose Valley Road in Rosemount, Ohio. It was built in 1964. This building no longer exists.

== Extracurricular activities ==
- Athletic: Baseball, boys' and girls' basketball, boys' and girls' cross country, boys' golf, boys' soccer, fast-pitch softball, boys' tennis, and girls' volleyball.
- Other activities: Academic competition team (quiz bowl), band, Bible Club, cheerleading, Encore (show choir), CHS National Honor Society, the Clay Pep Club, student council, the venturing club, and PNN.
- Community and school-related service activities: American Red Cross blood drives, CF (cystic fibrosis) walks, health fairs, political campaigns, Sierra's Haven, and other acts of volunteerism.

=== Athletics ===
Clay Junior–Senior High School is a "small division" school in every Ohio High School Athletic Association sports' division. The school participates in ten OHSAA sanctioned sports—baseball, boys' and girls' basketball, boys' and girls' cross country, boys' golf, boys' soccer, girls' fast pitch softball, boys' tennis, and girls' volleyball. The district also fields boys' and girls' basketball and volleyball teams in our junior high. The district also has baseball, golf, and softball as sports at the junior high level even though these teams are not recognized as official school teams.

There are ten school districts and eleven high schools in Scioto County along with one parochial school as well as several private and community schools. The school's athletic affiliation is with the Ohio High School Athletic Association (OHSAA) and the Southern Ohio Conference (SOC), which has sixteen member schools and is divided into two divisions (SOC I and SOC II) based on the schools' enrollment. The SOC includes teams from four different Ohio counties:

- Jackson County
  - Oak Hill High School
- Lawrence County
  - Saint Joseph Central Catholic High School
  - Symmes Valley High School
- Pike County
  - Waverly High School
  - Eastern High School
  - Western High School
- Scioto County
  - Clay High School
  - Green High School
  - Glenwood High School
  - Sciotoville Community School
  - Valley High School
  - Minford High School
  - Portsmouth West High School
  - Notre Dame High School
  - South Webster High School
  - Wheelersburg High School

See also Ohio High School Athletic Conferences and the Southern Ohio Conference

==== Softball ====
In athletics, the Clay softball team has won three OHSAA State Championships—1980, 1981, and 1983. The team was 79–1 in those three years under the direction of Carol Vice, a member of the Clay Coaches' Hall of Fame. In 1979 and 1988, the softball team was runner-up. The softball team has won 23 league titles, 29 sectional titles, 21 district titles, and ten regional titles along with three state championship banners. The softball team is the only team from Scioto County ever to win a state championship. In fact, the team was in the Final Four in nine out of the 11 years from 1978 to 1988. Carol and Clay Vice have their names/stars on the Portsmouth Wall of Fame in honor of their success and contributions to the Portsmouth area.

==== Boys' basketball ====
The boys' basketball team made it to the OHSAA Final Four in 1969 under the direction of Arch Justus, who is also a member of the Clay Coaches' Hall of Fame and the Ohio Basketball Coaches Hall of Fame. The team has also won 14 league titles (most recently in 2004–05), 23 sectional titles, three district titles, and one regional title.

==== Girls' basketball ====
The girls' basketball team went to the OHSAA Final Four in 1980. The team is still the only girls' Scioto County team and one of only two in the Southern Ohio Conference (Oak Hill being the other one) to reach that level. Terri Boldman, a member of the Clay Coaches' Hall of Fame and current high school assistant principal, guided the girls to the OHSAA Final Four. The girls' basketball team has won three league titles (1980, 2005, and 2006), 13 sectional titles, two district titles, and one regional title.

==== Baseball, golf, soccer, tennis, and volleyball ====
While these three sports may have garnered the spotlight in years past, Clay teams have won numerous league, sectional, district, regional, and state titles. The boys' baseball team won the Regional title in 1944 and has also captured 21 conference titles, 8 sectional titles, and 5 district titles. The volleyball team has won seven league titles, 15 sectional titles, four district titles, and went to the regional tournament as recently as 2007. Most recently, the golf team won its ninth straight league title. The team qualified for the state championships for three straight years between 2004 and 2006. The tennis team captured its first SOC title in 2005 and won it again in 2007 and 2008. In addition, the soccer team has won two league title and three sectional titles.

==== Ohio High School Athletic Association state championships, appearances, and records ====
- Boys' Basketball—OHSAA Final Four Appearance—1969 (Arcanum def. Clay 76–61)
- Girls' Basketball—OHSAA Final Four Appearance—1980
- Boys' Golf—OHSAA Division III State Championship Appearances—2004, 2005, 2006
- Girls' Softball

OHSAA State Championships

1980—(d. Archbold 18–6 and d. New Madison Tri-Village 12–3 to finish season at 25–0)
1981—(d. Jeromesville Hillsdale 7–2 and d. Beverly Fort Frye 21–0 to finish season at 29–0)
1983—(d. Pioneer North Central 8–7 and d. Mineral Ridge 6–2 to finish season at 24–1)

OHSAA State Runner-up

1979—(d. New Madison Tri-Village 11–2 and lost to Jeromesville Hillsdale 1–4 to finish the season at 19–1)
1988—(d. Sycamore Mohawk 10–0 and lost to Strasburg-Franklin 0–14 to finish the season at 27–3)

OHSAA Final Four Appearances (besides the Championships and Second Place Finishes)

1978—(lost to Jeromesville Hillsdale 5–0)
1984—(lost to Arcanum 10–4)
1986—(lost to Archbold 5–4)
2007—(lost to Triad 13–3 to finish season at 22–5)

OHSAA Softball Tournament Records

Most Runs (Game, One Team)—Portsmouth Clay (Division III) 21 v. Beverly Fort Frye, 1981
Most Hits (Game)—Portsmouth Clay (Division III) 19 v. Archbold, 1980
Most Hits (Game)—North Lewisburg Triad (Division IV) 13 v. Portsmouth Clay, 2007
Most Hits (Game, Both Teams)—Portsmouth Clay (Division III) 28 v. Archbold, 1980
Teresa Ruby—played in first four OHSAA state softball tournaments (1978–1981), coach (2007)

- Clay Championship Banners/Titles

==== School fight song ====
Clay High

Clay High
Three Cheers for old Clay High
Clay High
Clay High
For you we'll do or die!
Our hearts so true
We give to gold and blue
And so we pledge
The Best We Have to you
P-A-N-T-H-E-R-S

Panther, Panthers, Panthers are the BEST!

Words to the school fight song were written by Wanda Lake, a Clay alumna.

== Notable alumni, coaches, faculty, and staff ==
While many of the alumni, coaches, faculty, and staff listed below have not gained notable recognition abroad, all of these individuals are well-known figures in the Portsmouth and surrounding areas and they have made considerable contributions to the Clay Local School District, to the educational field, to the sports' teams they coached, and to the athletes and students.

- Carl Bandy, a long-time teacher and administrator in the district.
- Dale Bandy, 1956 Clay HS graduate and the son of long time administrator, Carl Bandy. He went on to play baseball and basketball at Ohio University. He was an assistant under legendary OU basketball coach Jim Snyder before taking over the reins in 1974 (1974–1980). He currently lives in Texas half of the year. The other half of the year he lives in Pennsylvania and is an assistant men's basketball coach for the California University of Pennsylvania Vulcans' squad under Bill Brown.
- Terri Boldman, 1968 Clay graduate, teacher (1972–current), coach (1974–81 and 1983–85), dean of students, current assistant principal, and member of the Clay Coaches' Hall of Fame.
- Arch Justus, teacher (1950–53 and 1958–83), principal (1968–77), superintendent (1978–82), and basketball coach (1959–83). He had a record of 394–169 while at Clay. His overall record was 532–220. He is also a member of Clay Coaches' Hall of Fame and a member of Ohio Basketball Coaches' Hall of Fame.
- David Leightenheimer, teacher (1963–86) and coach (1972–86). He is a member of the Clay Coaches' Hall of Fame and a member of the Ohio High School Officials' Hall of Fame
- Kinney Long, teacher (1939–71), principal (1946–47), and baseball coach (1939–71). He had a 408–160 record while at Clay and is a member of the Clay Coaches' Hall of Fame
- Teresa Ruby, a student-athlete and a 1981 Clay graduate who holds numerous girls' basketball records, including most points (1,846). Her jersey number (14) was retired. She was a member of the 1980 Final Four girls' basketball and state softball championship teams and the 1979 state softball runner-up team. She played softball and basketball at Morehead State University. She is currently the director of Southern Ohio Medical CenterHospice and is the assistant softball coach at Shawnee State University. She received a star on the Portsmouth Wall of Stars in 2009.
- Carol "Burgess" Vice, 1952 Clay graduate, teacher (1972–2002), coach (1978–88), and member of the Clay Coaches' Hall of Fame. As a softball coach, she finished with a 261–20 record. Her softball teams won three OHSAA state titles and were runners-up twice. She was inducted into the Ohio High School Fastpitch Softball Coaches Association Hall of Fame in 2010; and she has a star on the Portsmouth Wall of Stars.

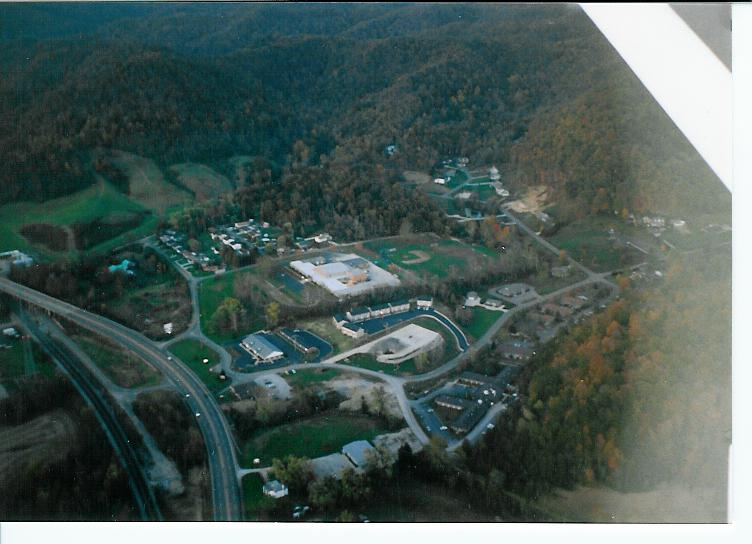
Clay Junior-Senior High School (aerial view, fall of 2003)

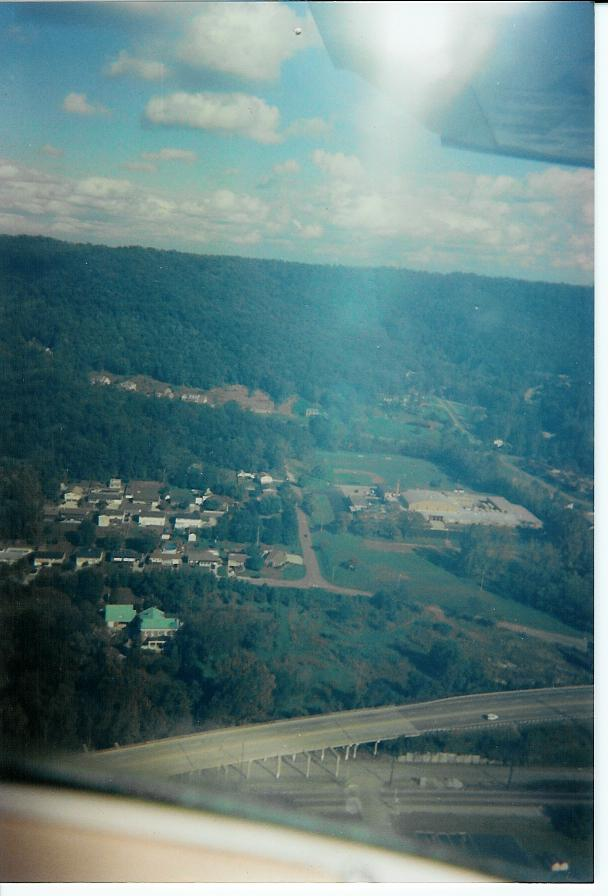
Clay Junior-Senior High School (aerial view, fall of 2003)
