= Northwest High School (McDermott, Ohio) =

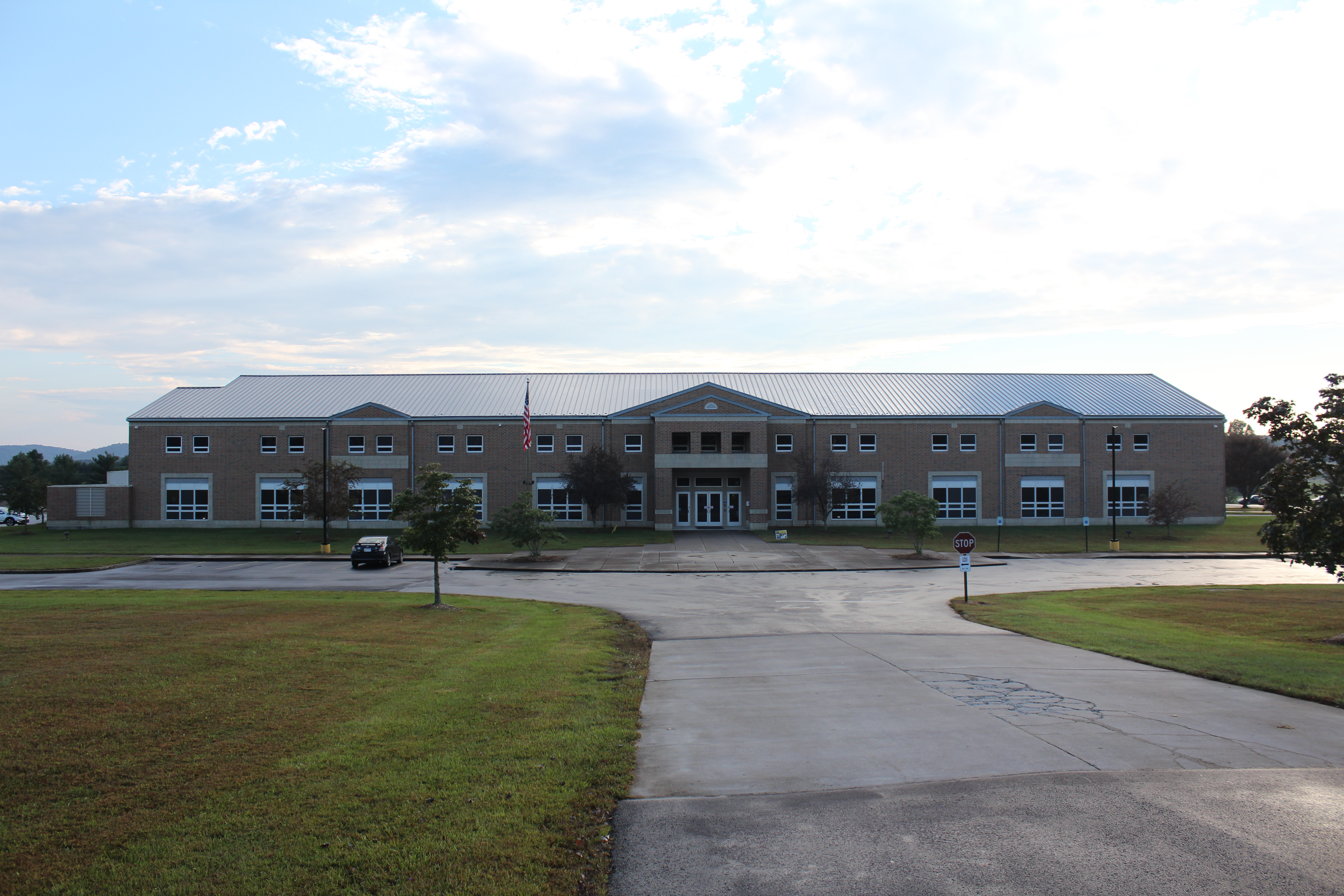

Location
- 914 Mohawk Drive; McDermott, Ohio; United States
- Coordinates: 38°52′46″N 83°05′04″W

Information
- Type: public, rural, high school
- Established: 1958
- School district: Northwest Local School District
- Principal: Rick Scarberry
- Head of school: Todd Jenkins, Superintendent
- Grades: 9–12
- Enrollment: 355 (2023-2024)
- Colors: Red and blue
- Athletics: baseball, boys' and girls' basketball, boys' and girls' cross country, football, boys' and girls' golf, boys' soccer, fast pitch softball, boys' and girls' swimming, boys' and girls' track, and volleyball
- Athletics conference: Southern Ohio Conference
- Mascot: Mohawks
- Website: District Website

Northwest High School (NHS) is a public high school in McDermott, Ohio in Scioto County in Southern Ohio. It is the only high school in the Northwest Local School District. The school mascot is the Mohawks and their school colors are red, white and blue.

== History ==
Future governor of Ohio, Ted Strickland was part of the class of 1959. While governor of Ohio, Strickland spoke at the school, and told students to "remember their rural roots".

As of 2022, less than half of seniors who graduate go on to attend college.

== Athletics ==
There are ten school districts and eleven high schools in Scioto County along with one parochial school as well several private and community schools. The school's athletic affiliation is with the Ohio High School Athletic Association (OHSAA) and the Southern Ohio Conference (SOC), which has seventeen member schools and is divided into two divisions (SOC I & SOC II) based on the schools' enrollment. The SOC includes teams from four different Ohio counties - Jackson County (Oak Hill High School), Lawrence County (Saint Joseph Central High School and Symmes Valley High School), Pike County (Waverly High School, Eastern High School, and Western High School), and Scioto County (Clay High School, Green High School, Glenwood High School, Sciotoville Community School, Valley High School, Northwest High School, Minford High School, Portsmouth West High School, Notre Dame High School, South Webster High School, and Wheelersburg High School).

See also Ohio High School Athletic Conferences and the Southern Ohio Conference

== Notable alumni ==
- Steve Free - Five time ASCAP Award Winner for songwriting, ASCAP Award for performances on National Public Radio 1998, Academy of Independent Recording Artist singer/songwriter of the year 1996, and Airplay International Lifetime Achievement Award, 1999, 2000.
- Ted Strickland - Former governor of Ohio and U.S. Representative, Class of 1959

== Notable Coaches ==
- Ed Cable (Northwest) - Recipient of the Ohio Sportsmanship, Ethics, & Integrity Softball Coaches' Award (2002)
- Dave Frantz - Former Head Football Coach and present Athletic Director and Track Coach, recipient of the Ohio Sportsmanship, Ethics, and Integrity Award for Track and Field Coaches.
- Dennis Hagerty - Former baseball coach, 2005 Ohio High School Baseball Coaches Hall of Fame Inductee
