= Symmes Valley High School =

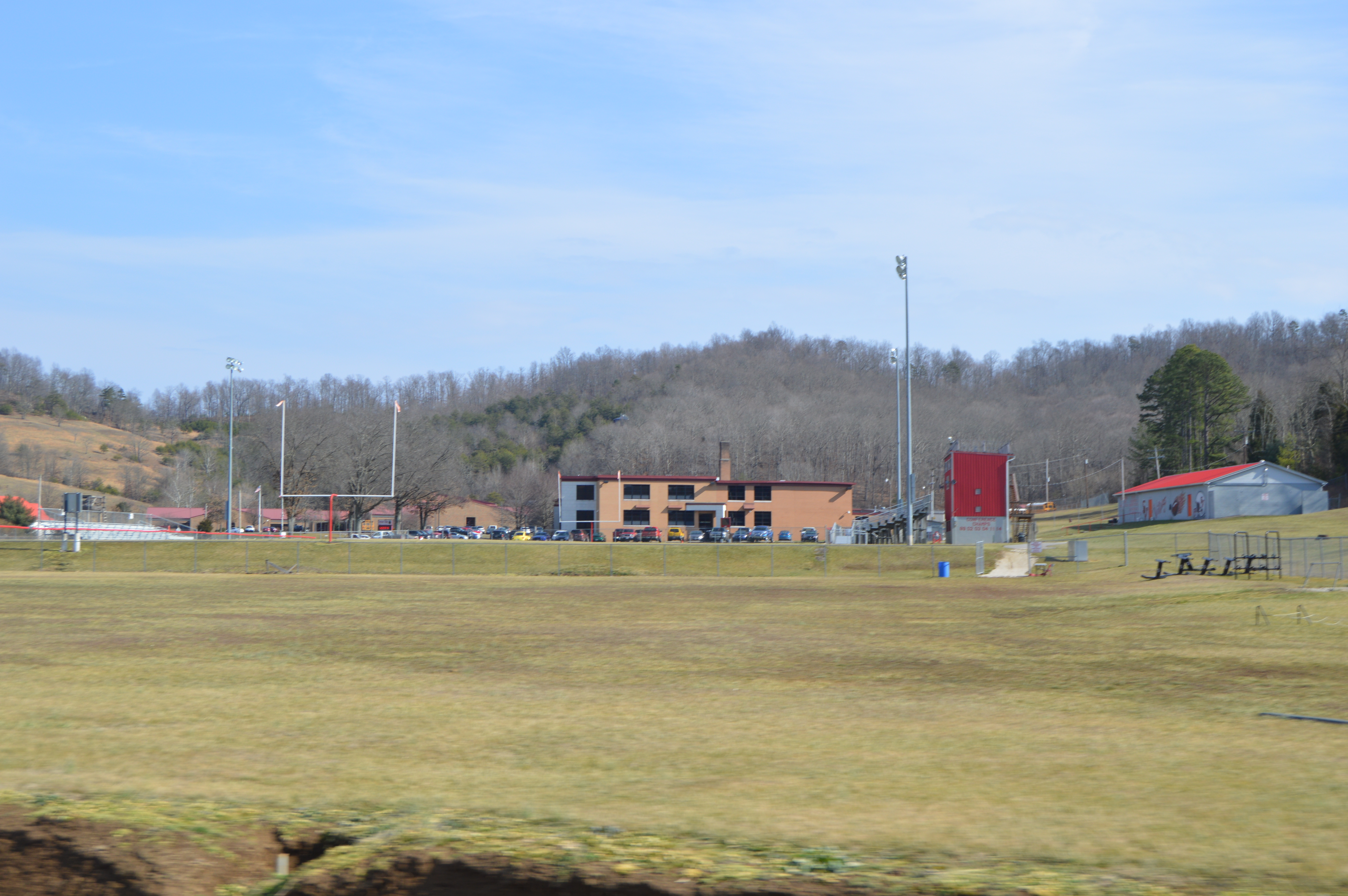
- Seen from the west on State Route 141

Location
- 14778 State Route 141; Willow Wood, (Lawrence County), Ohio 45696; United States
- Coordinates: 38°36′28″N 82°29′1″W

Information
- Type: Public, coeducational high school
- Established: 1961
- School district: Symmes Valley Local School District
- Superintendent: Greg Bowman
- Principal: Zacc Russell
- Grades: 9-12
- Enrollment: 169 (2022-23)
- Colors: Scarlet and gray
- Fight song: "Go Symmes Valley HS"
- Athletics: baseball, boys' and girls' basketball, football, fast pitch softball, and girls' volleyball
- Athletics conference: Southern Ohio Conference
- Mascot: Viking
- Team name: Vikings
- Athletic director: Eric Holland
- Website: District website

Symmes Valley High School (SVHS) is a public high school near Willow Wood in Lawrence County in Southern Ohio, United States. It is the only high school in the Symmes Valley Local School District. The school's athletic teams are known as the Vikings, and the official school colors are scarlet and gray. There are currently approximately 300 students enrolled in grades 9-12.

== History ==
Symmes Valley High School was created with the consolidation of Waterloo High School, Windsor High School, and Mason-Aid High School. Classes began in 1961.

The main portion of the building was constructed in 1961, and there have been several building modernization projects and additions. Six additional classrooms were added to the school in 1975. In 1994, a new elementary building was added on the same campus. Renovations were done, including the removal of asbestos, and the addition of a new heating and air conditioning system, new lights, new ceilings, and new windows. A new band room was constructed at the rear of the building, and the gym received new seating, a refurbishment of the floor, and new paint. In 2003, another multimillion-dollar project was completed. A new, state-of-the-art library and media center was constructed along with new offices, a new kitchen and cafeteria, and several new classrooms. The hallways received new flooring, new lighting and ceilings again, all new interior doors, and painting. The home economics classroom was also completely remodeled. The gymnasium again received new seating in the summer of 2007, along with a sanding and repainting of the gymnasium floor.

== Athletics ==
The Vikings are members of the Southern Ohio Conference (SOC) and compete in baseball (boys), basketball (girls and boys), football (boys), softball (girls), and volleyball (girls). According to the Ohio High School Athletic Association (OHSAA), the school is in Division VII for football and Division IV for baseball, basketball, softball, and volleyball. These divisions are for the smallest schools in Ohio.

The S.O.C. includes teams from four different Ohio counties - Jackson County (Oak Hill High School), Lawrence County (Saint Joseph Central High School and Symmes Valley High School), Pike County (Waverly High School, Eastern High School, and Western High School), and Scioto County (Clay High School, Green High School, Glenwood High School, Sciotoville Community School, Valley High School, Northwest High School, Minford High School, Portsmouth West High School, Notre Dame High School, South Webster High School, and Wheelersburg High School).

See also Ohio High School Athletic Conferences and the Southern Ohio Conference.

=== Ohio High School Athletic Association championships and appearances ===
- Boys' basketball (as Waterloo High School before consolidation, "Waterloo Wonders")

OHSAA State Championship

1934 (d. Lowellville 43-32 & d. Mark Center 40-26)
1935 (d. Fremont St. Joseph 48-21 & d. Oxford Stewart 25-22)
