= Valley High School (Ohio) =

Coordinates: 38.88208°N 82.965882°W

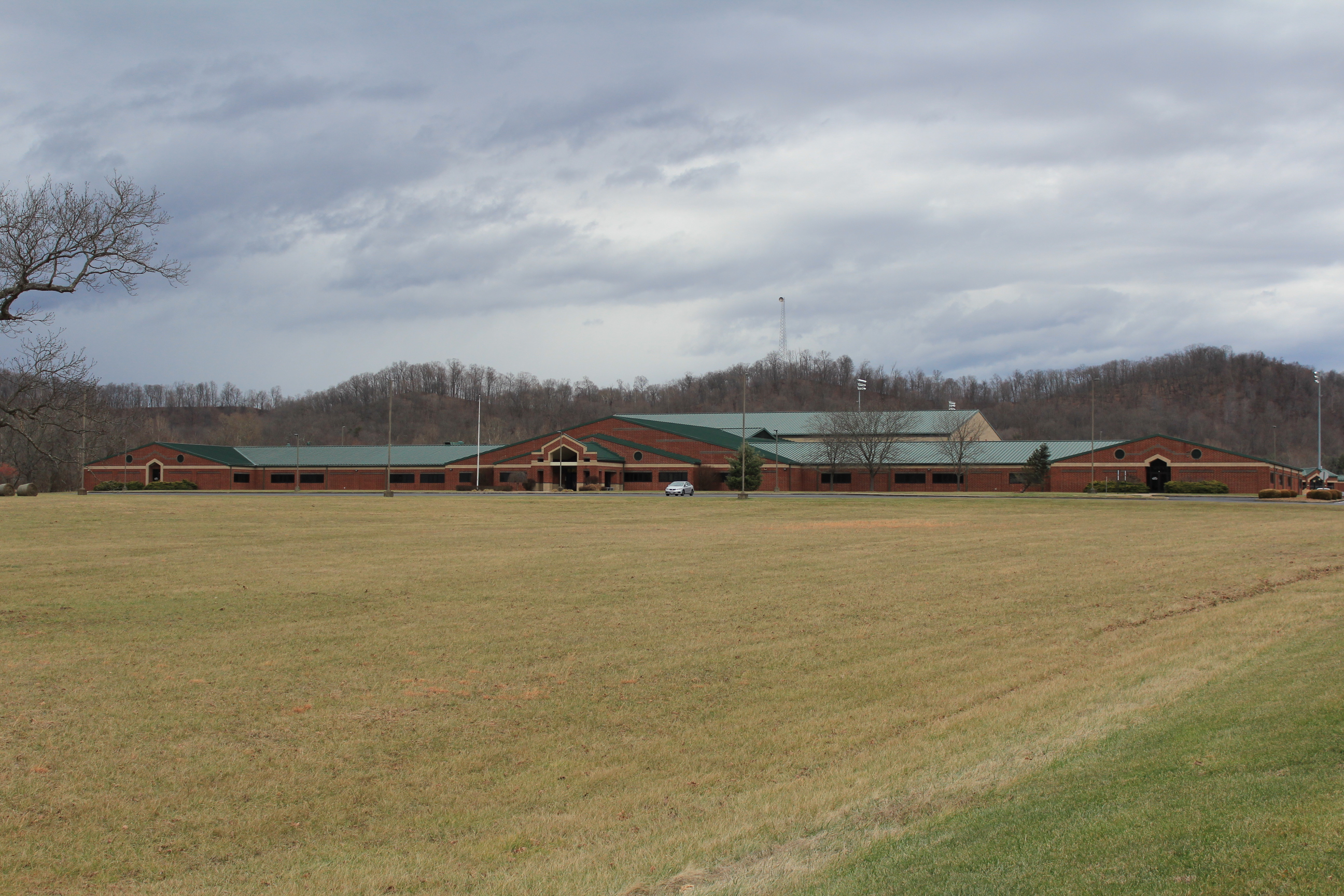
- 1821 St. Rte. 728 Lucasville, Ohio; United States

Information
- Type: Ohio, public, rural, high school
- Established: 1942
- School district: Lucasville Valley Local School District
- Principal: Kari Smith, Principal Jason Fell, Athletic Director
- Head of school: Aaron Franke, Superintendent
- Grades: 9-12
- Enrollment: 281 (2023-2024)
- Colors: Purple and gold
- Athletics: Football, basketball, baseball, soccer, track and field, softball, volleyball, cross country, tennis, swimming, golf
- Athletics conference: Southern Ohio Conference
- Mascot: Indians
- Website: District Website

Valley High School (VHS) is a public high school in Lucasville in Scioto County in southern Ohio. It is the only high school in the Valley Local School District. Their nickname is the Indians, and their colors are purple and gold.

== Campus ==
The high school building is located on a large property adjacent to the Southern Ohio Correctional Facility. The Valley Elementary School building sits on the same property northeast of the high school building. The local Kiwanis group assisted in the setting up of playground equipment on the side of the elementary building.

Both the high school and elementary were built in 1992-1993 and were scheduled to begin holding classes after the Easter break in the spring of 1993. However, a prisoner uprising on Easter Sunday at the Southern Ohio Correctional Facility, commonly referred to as the Lucasville Prison Riot, prevented the opening of the buildings.

The high school stadium which boasts a FieldTurf surface is immediately north of the high school building and finished construction prior to the start of the school year in 2000. The high school has tennis courts as well as five baseball/softball fields, three additional soccer fields, and two football fields used for local youth sports are also located on the property. The high school baseball and softball stadiums are located on a nearby property.

== Academics ==
Valley High School has an average graduating class size of 94 students, and the student teacher ratio is 16:1. The number of students in grade 10 that were at or above proficiency standards exceeded the state average in all five subjects of the Ohio Graduation Test in 2011. Advance Placement courses are offered in English literature and composition, U.S. government and politics, calculus, and chemistry.

== Athletics ==
There are ten school districts and eleven high schools in Scioto County along with one parochial school as well several private and community schools. The school's athletic affiliation is with the Ohio High School Athletic Association (OHSAA) and the Southern Ohio Conference (SOC), which has seventeen member schools and is divided into two divisions (SOC I & SOC II) based on the schools' enrollment. The SOC includes teams from four different Ohio counties - Jackson County (Oak Hill High School), Lawrence County (Saint Joseph Central High School and Symmes Valley High School), Pike County (Waverly High School, Eastern High School, and Western High School), and Scioto County (Clay High School, Green High School, Glenwood High School, Sciotoville Community School, Valley High School, Northwest High School, Minford High School, Portsmouth West High School, Notre Dame High School, South Webster High School, and Wheelersburg High School).

See also Ohio High School Athletic Conferences and the Southern Ohio Conference

=== Ohio High School Athletic Association championships and appearances ===
- Boys' Baseball

OHSAA Division A Championship

1975 - defeated Russia 5-0
2021- Final four Appearance, Division IV, defeated by Lincolnview, 2-1

- Girls' Softball

OHSAA Final Four Appearances

1993 - lost to North Robinson Colonel Crawford 9-3
1994 - lost to Jeromesville Hillsdale 6-1

- Boys' Soccer

OHSAA Final Four Appearance

1998 - lost to Canal Fulton Northwest 7-2

- Football

2014 - Regional Champions. Lost to Kirtland 28-7 in State Semi Finals

== Notable alumni ==
- Branch Rickey – professional baseball player and executive who broke Major League Baseball's color barrier by signing Jackie Robinson
- Gene Tenace – professional baseball player and coach, 6 time World Series Champion
