= Western High School (Ohio) =

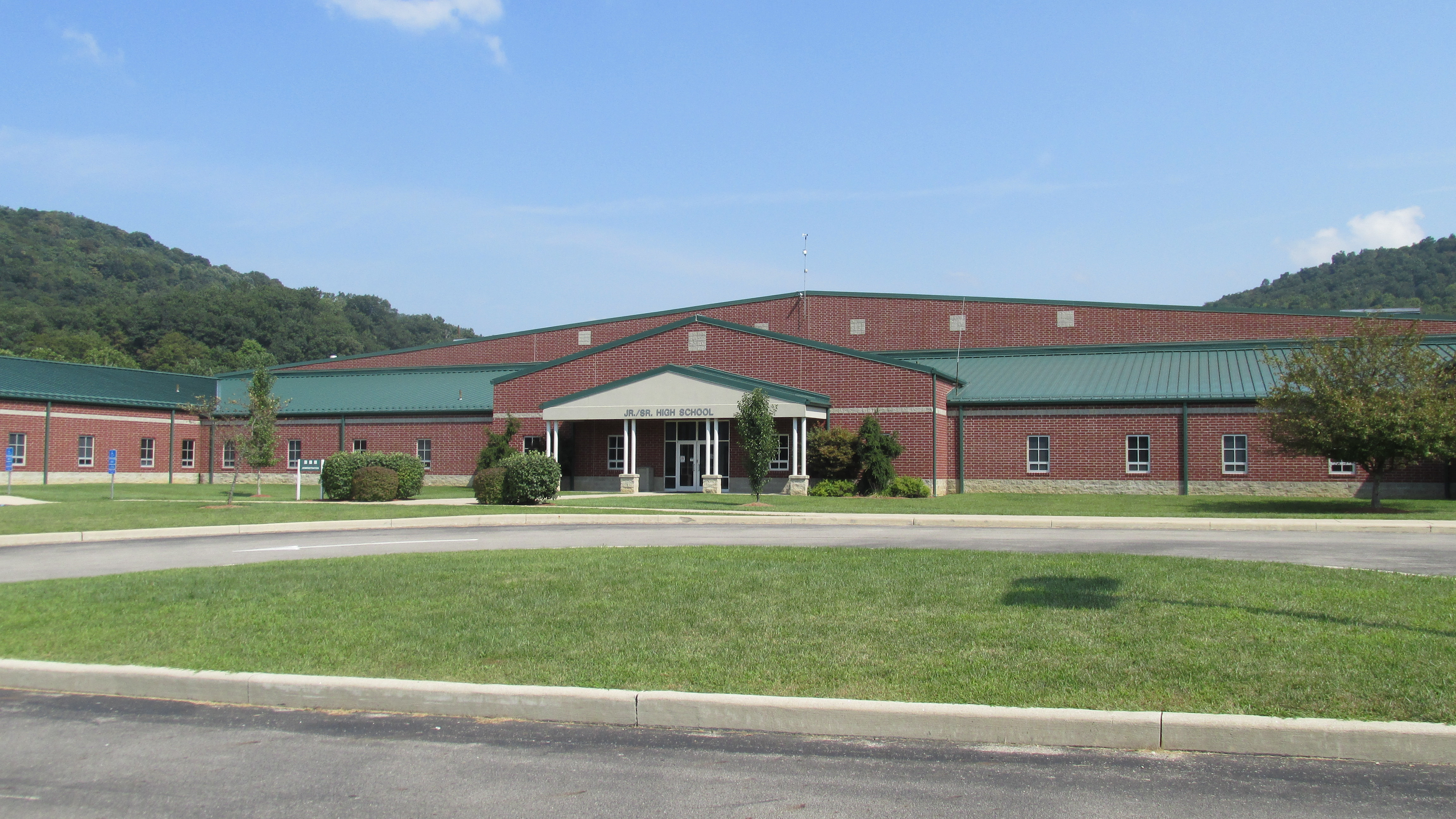

Location
- 7959 St. Rte. 124, Latham, Ohio
- Coordinates: 39°5′55″N 83°14′48″W

Information
- Type: Ohio, public, rural, high school
- School district: Western Local School District
- Principal: Carrie Gast
- Grades: 7-12
- Enrollment: 281 (2023-2024)
- Colors: Green and white
- Athletics: baseball, boys' and girls' basketball, boys' and girls' cross country, boys' golf, fastpitch softball, boys' and girls' track, and girls' volleyball
- Athletics conference: Southern Ohio Conference
- Mascot: Indian
- Website: District Website

Western High School (WHS) is a public high school in Latham, Pike County in Southern Ohio. It is the only high school in the Western Local School District. Their nickname is the Indians and their school colors are green and white.

== Athletics ==
The school's athletic affiliation is with the Ohio High School Athletic Association (OHSAA) and the Southern Ohio Conference (SOC), which has seventeen member schools and is divided into two divisions (SOC I & SOC II) based on the schools' enrollment. The SOC includes teams from four different Ohio counties - Jackson County (Oak Hill High School), Lawrence County (Saint Joseph Central High School and Symmes Valley High School), Pike County (Waverly High School, Eastern High School, and Western High School), and Scioto County (Clay High School, Green High School, Glenwood High School, Sciotoville Community School, Valley High School, Northwest High School, Minford High School, Portsmouth West High School, Notre Dame High School, South Webster High School, and Wheelersburg High School).

See also Ohio High School Athletic Conferences and the Southern Ohio Conference
