= South Webster High School =

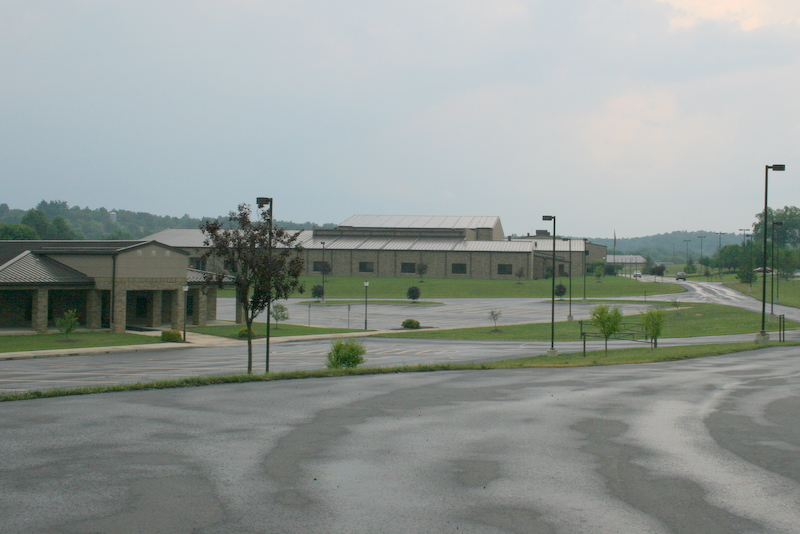

Location
- 10529 Main Street; South Webster, Ohio 45682; United States
- 38°49′03″N 82°43′59″W

Information
- Other name: SWHS
- Type: Public high school
- School district: Bloom-Vernon Local Schools
- NCES School ID: 390495903640
- Principal: Brett Roberts
- Teaching staff: 22.00 (on an FTE basis)
- Grades: 7–12
- Enrollment: 348 (2023-2024)
- Student to teacher ratio: 15.82
- Colors: Red, White, Black
- Athletics conference: Southern Ohio Conference
- Mascot: Jeep
- Nickname: Jeeps
- Website: www.bvjeeps.org

South Webster High School (SWHS) is a public Jr/Sr high school in South Webster, Ohio. It is the only high school in the Bloom-Vernon Local School District.

== Athletics ==
There are ten school districts and eleven high schools in Scioto County along with one parochial school as well several private and community schools. The school's athletic affiliation is with the Ohio High School Athletic Association (OHSAA) and the Southern Ohio Conference (SOC), which has seventeen member schools and is divided into two divisions (SOC I & SOC II) based on the schools' enrollment. The SOC includes teams from four different Ohio counties - Jackson County (Oak Hill High School), Lawrence County (Saint Joseph Central High School and Symmes Valley High School), Pike County (Waverly High School, Eastern High School, and Western High School), and Scioto County (Clay High School, Green High School, Glenwood High School, Sciotoville Community School, Valley High School, Northwest High School, Minford High School, Portsmouth West High School, Notre Dame High School, South Webster High School, and Wheelersburg High School).

=== Ohio High School Athletic Association championships and appearances ===
- Boys' Basketball

OHSAA State Championship

2006 - (d. Lockland 61-58 & d. Columbus Grove 83-65)

OHSAA Final Four Appearances

2004 - (Holgate d. South Webster 31-28)
2025 - (Cornerstone Christian d. South Webster 66-58)
