= Sciotoville Community School =

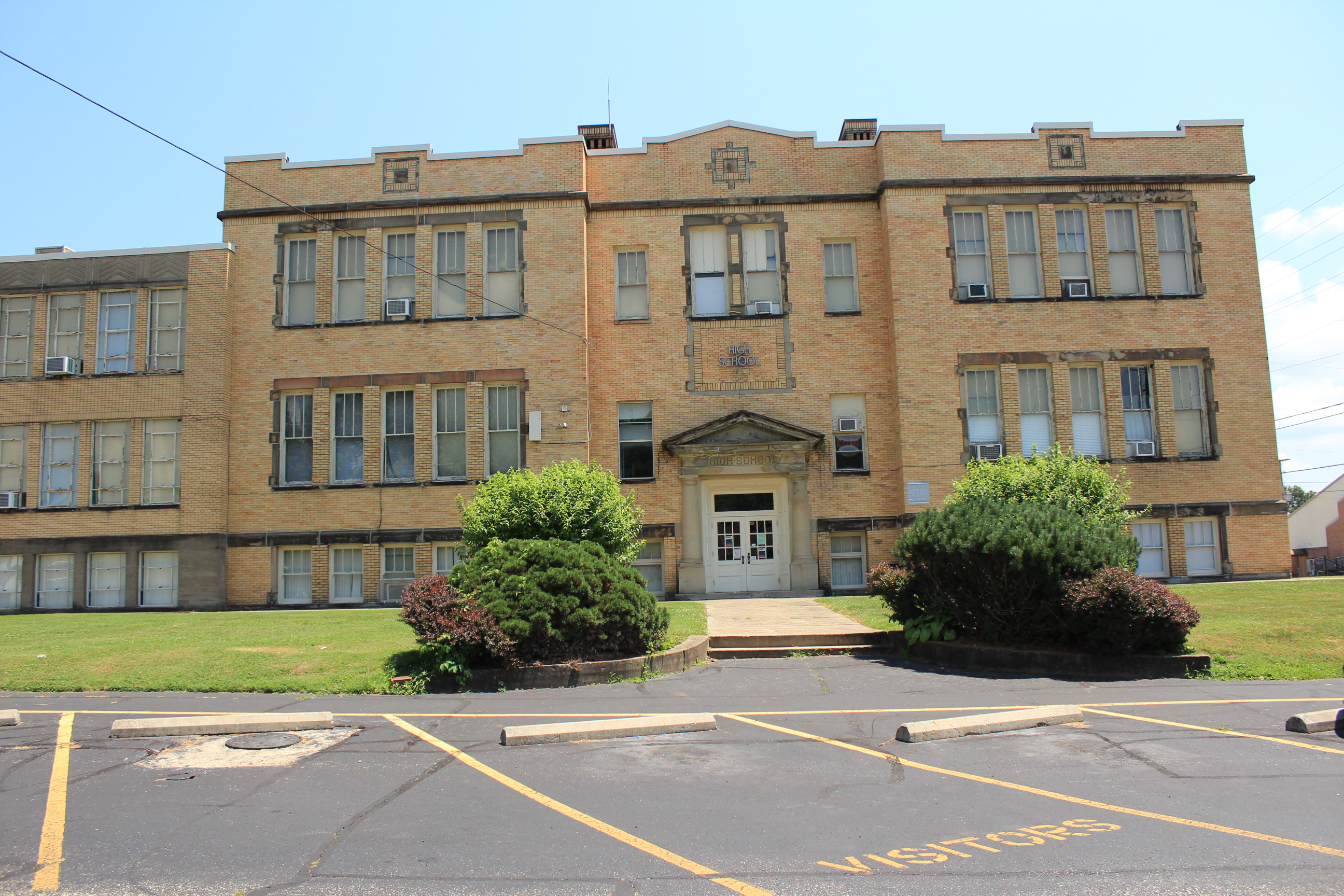

Location
- 224 Marshall Avenue; Sciotoville, Ohio 45662; United States
- Coordinates: 38°45′31″N 82°53′18″W

Information
- Former name: East High School
- Type: High school
- Established: 1927
- School district: Sciotoville Community School
- Superintendent: Foresta Shope (Acting in Capacity as Principal)
- Principal: Lance Davis
- Grades: 6–12
- Colors: Blue and gray
- Athletics: Baseball, boys' and girls' basketball, football, boys' golf, fast pitch softball, boys' and girls' swimming, boys' tennis, boys' and girls' track, and volleyball
- Athletics conference: Southern Ohio Conference
- Mascot: Tartans
- Website: ehs.easttartans.org

Sciotoville Community School is a charter school in Sciotoville (within the city limits of Portsmouth), Scioto County, Ohio, United States. Their mascot is the Tartans and their colors are blue and white/gray. In 2000, East High School was supposed to be closed by the City of Portsmouth, but with public effort, they were able to convert the high school to a community school.

== Athletics ==
There are ten school districts and eleven high schools in Scioto County along with one parochial school as well several private and community schools. The school's athletic affiliation is with the Ohio High School Athletic Association (OHSAA) and the Southern Ohio Conference (SOC), which has seventeen member schools and is divided into two divisions (SOC I & SOC II) based on the schools' enrollment. The SOC includes teams from four different Ohio counties - Jackson County (Oak Hill High School), Lawrence County (Saint Joseph Central High School and Symmes Valley High School), Pike County (Waverly High School, Eastern High School, and Western High School), and Scioto County (Clay High School, Green High School, Glenwood High School, Sciotoville Community School, Valley High School, Northwest High School, Minford High School, Portsmouth West High School, Notre Dame High School, South Webster High School, and Wheelersburg High School).

For the first time in their 97-year history, East High School has its own football and tennis athletic facilities in 2007. The Portsmouth city council sold Allard Park, a former city-owned park where the Tartans have played their contests, to the Sciotoville Community School for $1. In the ceremony, Bill Shope, Sciotoville Community School's governing body president, gave Jim Kalb, Portsmouth's mayor, a 1921 silver dollar representing the date in which Sciotoville became a part of Portsmouth.

=== Ohio High School Athletic Association championships and appearances ===
- Boys' Baseball - 1973 (East def. Adena Buckeye West 5–3)

== See also ==
- Ohio High School Athletic Conferences
