= Wheelersburg High School =

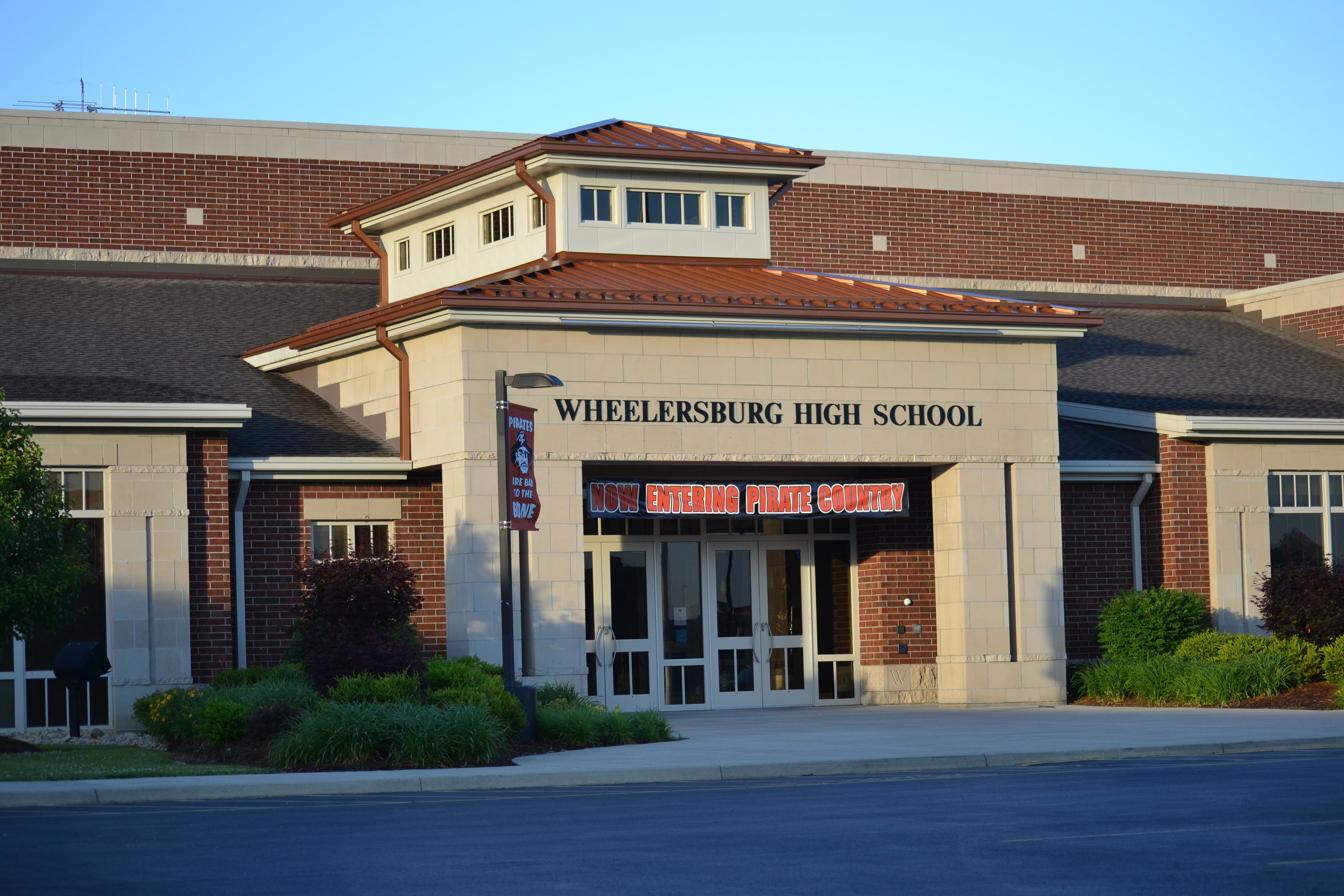

Location
- 800 Pirate Drive; Wheelersburg, Ohio 45694; United States
- Coordinates: 38.7222222°N 82.8466667°W

Information
- Type: Public high school
- School district: Wheelersburg Local School District
- NCES School ID: 390496603667
- Principal: Chris Porter
- Teaching staff: 18.00 (on an FTE basis)
- Grades: 9-12
- Enrollment: 462 (2023-2024)
- Student to teacher ratio: 25.67
- Colors: Orange and black
- Athletics conference: Southern Ohio Conference - Division IV
- Mascot: Pirates
- Website: hs.wheelersburg.net

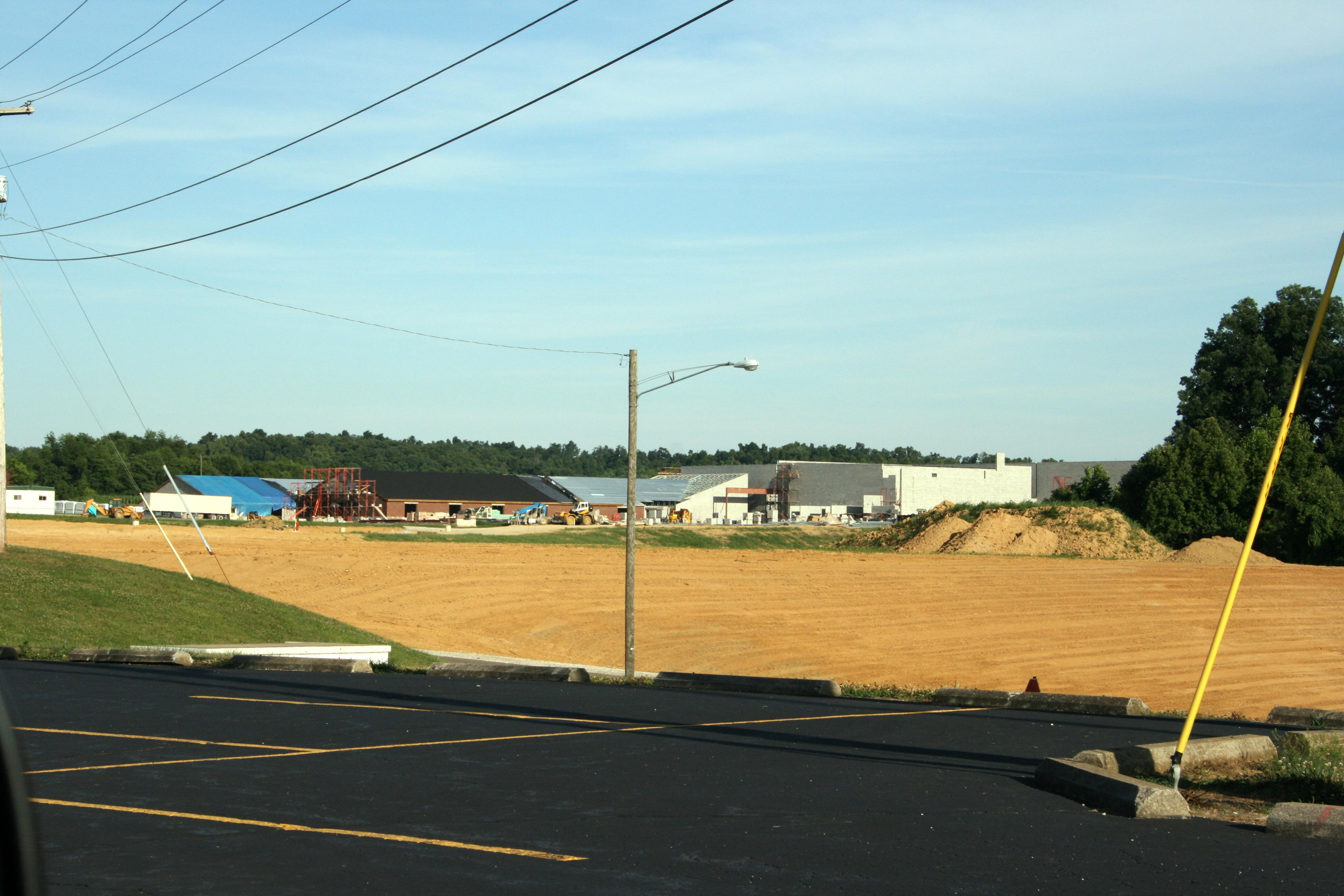
A view of construction on the new Wheelersburg (K-12) School from the current high school parking lot.

Wheelersburg High School (WHS) is a public high school in Wheelersburg, Ohio, United States. It is the only high school in the Wheelersburg Local School District, which is located in Porter Township along the northern bank of the Ohio River in Southern Ohio. Wheelersburg's mascot is the Pirates and their school colors are orange and black.

The district is bordered by the Bloom-Vernon Local School District and the Minford Local School District to the north along Ohio 140, the Green Local School District to the east along U.S. 52 and Ohio 522 (before entering Lawrence County), and the Portsmouth City School District to the west.

Students entered a new K-12 academic building during the 2008–2009 school year.

== Academics ==
Wheelersburg High School won the Ohio Academic Competition in 1985 and 1986. The school also won the 1984 National Academic Championship.

For the past five years, the Wheelersburg High School has received an "Excellent" rating on the State of Ohio's Local Report Card.

== Athletics ==
There are ten school districts and eleven high schools in Scioto County along with one parochial school as well as several private and community schools. The school's athletic affiliation is with the Ohio High School Athletic Association (OHSAA) and the Southern Ohio Conference (SOC), which has seventeen member schools and is divided into two divisions (SOC I & SOC II) based on the schools' enrollment. The SOC includes teams from four different Ohio counties - Jackson County (Oak Hill High School), Lawrence County (Saint Joseph Central High School and Symmes Valley High School), Pike County (Waverly High School, Eastern High School, and Western High School), and Scioto County (Clay High School, Green High School, Glenwood High School, Sciotoville Community School, Valley High School, Northwest High School, Minford High School, Portsmouth West High School, Notre Dame High School, South Webster High School, and Wheelersburg High School).

See also Ohio High School Athletic Conferences and the Southern Ohio Conference

=== State championships ===
- Baseball - 1996, 2012, 2013
- Football - 1989, 2016, 2017, 2022, 2023, 2025
- Softball - 2026

== Notable alumni ==
- Kylan Darnell, Class of 2022 - Miss Ohio Teen USA 2022 and internet personality
- George Washington Rightmire - President of Ohio State University (1925-1938)
- Seth Morrison, Class of 2006 - Lead Guitarist Skillet
- Josh Newman, Class of 2000 - Former MLB pitcher and current assistant baseball coach at Penn State Nittany Lions
- Redonda Miller, Class of 1984 - Current President of The Johns Hopkins Hospital
- Matthew W. McFarland, Class of 1985 - United States District Judge of the United States District Court for the Southern District of Ohio and former Judge of the Ohio Fourth District Court of Appeals.
