= Northwest Local School District =

Northwest Local School District may refer to:

- Northwest Local School District (Hamilton County, Ohio), Hamilton County, Ohio
- Northwest Local School District (Scioto County), Scioto County, Ohio
- Northwest Local School District (Stark County, Ohio), Stark County, Ohio
