= Northwest School District =

Northwest School District may refer to:

- Northwest Independent School District, Dallas–Fort Worth metroplex, north Texas
- Northwest Local School District (Hamilton County, Ohio), Ohio
- Northwest Local School District (Scioto County), Ohio
- Northwest Local School District (Stark County, Ohio), Ohio
- Northwest R-I School District, Jefferson County, Missouri
