= McDermott, Ohio =

- CDP
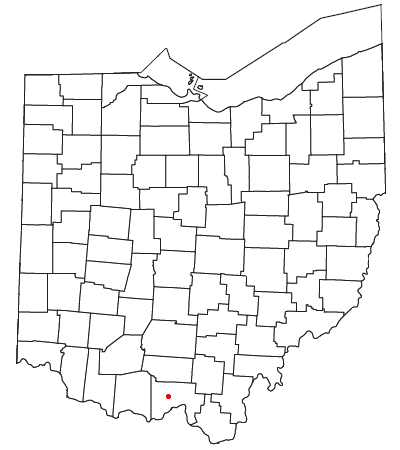
- Location of McDermott, Ohio
- Coordinates: 38°50′04″N 83°03′31″W
- Country: United States
- State: Ohio
- County: Scioto
- Township: Rush
- Elevation: 571 ft (174 m)

Population (2020)
  - Total: 308
- Time zone: UTC-5 (Eastern (EST))
  - Summer (DST): UTC-4 (EDT)
- ZIP code: 45652
- Area codes: 740, 220
- GNIS feature ID: 2628930

McDermott is a census-designated place in western Rush Township, Scioto County, Ohio, United States. As of the 2020 census it had a population of 308. It has a post office with the ZIP code 45652.

== History ==
Platted on July 28, 1898, the community of McDermott is named after one of the area's earliest commercial ventures, McDermott Stone Company. A post office called McDermott has been in operation since 1898.

== Education ==
The Northwest Local School District includes the Northwest High School.
