= Minford (disambiguation) =

Minford, Ohio, is census-designated place located in Ohio.

Minford may also refer to:

- John Minford, sinologist and literary translator
- Nat Minford, Unionist politician in Northern Ireland
- Patrick Minford, British macroeconomist
- Sue Minford, Irish tennis player
- Minford High School, rural, public, high school located in Minford, Ohio
