= Portsmouth High School =

Portsmouth High School may refer to:

United Kingdom

- Portsmouth High School (Southsea) — Southsea, England

United States

- Portsmouth Abbey School — Portsmouth, Rhode Island (private school)
- Portsmouth High School (Rhode Island) — Portsmouth, Rhode Island (public school)
- Portsmouth High School (New Hampshire) — Portsmouth, New Hampshire
- Portsmouth High School (Ohio) — Portsmouth, Ohio
- Portsmouth West High School — West Portsmouth, Ohio
