= Southern Ohio Conference =

- Founded: 1946
- Founder: Charter Members: Central Catholic HS (Notre Dame), Glenwood HS (New Boston), Portsmouth East HS (Sciotoville Community), Washington Township HS (Portsmouth West), & Waverly HS
- Type: Ohio High School Athletic Association athletic conference
- Purpose: Athletic participation
- Region served: 5 Ohio counties (Jackson, Lawrence, Pike, Gallia, & Scioto)
- Members: 18
- Commissioner: Tony Mantell
- Key people: Athletic Directors: Mark Rose (Clay) Adam Bailey (East) Rob Day (Eastern) Matthew McCorkle (Green) Kristin Ruby (Minford) Donnie Stapleton (New Boston) Bill Crabtree (Northwest) Bob Boldman (Notre Dame) Beth McCorkle (Oak Hill) Greg Bryant (St. Joe) Greg Sullivan (South Webster) Eric Holland (Symmes Valley) Darren Crabtree (Valley) Bo Arnett (Waverly) Ben Johnson (West) Rachel Henderson (Western) Jarod Shaw (Wheelersburg)

The Southern Ohio Conference (S.O.C.) is an athletic conference in Ohio. The conference is also a member of the Ohio High School Athletic Association, the governing body of Ohio athletics. There are currently seventeen member schools in the conference. The S.O.C. includes teams from five different Ohio counties - Jackson County (Oak Hill High School), Lawrence County (St. Joe High School and Symmes Valley High School), Pike County (Waverly High School, Eastern High School, and Western High School), and Scioto County (Clay High School, Green High School, Glenwood High School, Sciotoville Community School, Valley High School, Northwest High School, Minford High School, Portsmouth West High School, Notre Dame High School, South Webster High School, and Wheelersburg High School). Portsmouth High School will join the conference in 2027. The conference recognizes: baseball, boys' and girls' basketball, boys' and girls' cross country, football, boys' and girls' soccer, fast pitch softball, boys' and girls' swimming, boys' and girls' tennis, boys' and girls' track and field athletics, and girls' volleyball.

It is listed as part of the Ohio High School Athletic Conferences.

== Conference Information ==
Football

SOC Division I: East (Sciotoville), Eastern (Pike), Green, Notre Dame, Symmes Valley, South Gallia

SOC Division II: Minford, Northwest, Oak Hill, Portsmouth West, Valley, Waverly, & Wheelersburg

Basketball/Volleyball/Baseball/Softball

SOC Division I: Clay, East (Sciotoville), Ironton St. Joseph, Glenwood (New Boston) Green, Notre Dame

SOC Division II: Eastern (Pike), Northwest, Oak Hill, South Gallia, Symmes Valley, Western (Pike)

SOC Division III: Minford, Portsmouth West, South Webster, Valley, Waverly, Wheelersburg

== Southern Ohio Conference Mem ==
=== S.O.C. Division I (Smaller Schools) ===
- Portsmouth Clay Panthers^{4} (1979–present)
- New Boston Glenwood Tigers (1946–present)
- Franklin Furnace Green Bobcats^{4} (1979–present)
- Portsmouth Notre Dame Titans (Portsmouth Central Catholic until 1984, 1954–present)
- Ironton St.Joseph Central Flyers (2019–present)
- Sciotoville Community East Tartans (formerly Portsmouth East, 1946–present)
- Crown City South Gallia Rebels (2023–present)
- Willow Wood Symmes Valley Vikings (1991–present)
- Latham Western Indians (2002–present)

=== S.O.C. Division II (Larger Schools) ===
- Minford Falcons^{2} (1947–58, to Scioto County League, 1959–present)
- McDermott Northwest Mohawks^{2} (1960–present) *plays in smaller division for football
- Oak Hill Oaks (1991–present) *played in smaller division for football until 2019
- West Portsmouth Portsmouth West Senators (Washington Twp. until 1950, 1946–present)
- South Webster Jeeps^{4} (1979–present) *plays in smaller division for golf and boys soccer until 2019
- Lucasville Valley Indians^{2} (1958–present) *plays in smaller division for boys soccer
- Waverly Tigers^{1} (1946–70, to Southeastern Ohio Athletic League, 1983–present)
- Wheelersburg Pirates^{2, 3} (1950–present)
- Beaver Eastern Eagles^{4} (1981–present)
1. Concurrent with Pike County League 1946-64.
2. Concurrent with SCL from entry into SOC until 1979.
3. Concurrent with Ohio Valley Conference 1954-57.
4. Concurrent with southeastern Tri-County League from entry into SOC until 1985

=== Former Members ===
- Portsmouth Holy Redeemer Wildcats (1946–54, consolidated into Portsmouth Central Catholic)
- Portsmouth St. Mary's Titans (1946–54, consolidated into Portsmouth Central Catholic)
- Chesapeake Panthers (1948–1954, to Ohio Valley Conference)
- South Point Pointers^{1} (1948–51, to Lawrence County)
- Coal Grove Dawson-Bryant Hornets^{1} (1950–1952, to Lawrence County)
- Piketon Redstreaks (1958–62, to Scioto Valley League)
- Ironton St. Joseph Central Flyers (1982–89)
1. Concurrent with Lawrence County League for the duration of SOC membership.

== Ohio High School Athletic Association state championships and appearances ==
- Portsmouth Clay

Boys' Basketball

OHSAA Final Four Appearance

1969 (Arcanum def. Clay 76-61)

Girls' Basketball

OHSAA Final Four Appearance

1980

Boys' Golf

OHSAA Division III State Championship Appearances

2004, 2005, 2006

Girls' Softball

OHSAA State Championships

1980 - (d. Archbold 18-6 & d. New Madison Tri-Village 12-3 to finish season at 25-0)
1981 - (d. Jeromesville Hillsdale 7-2 & d. Beverly Fort Frye 21-0 to finish season at 29-0)
1983 - (d. Pioneer North Central 8-7 & d. Mineral Ridge 6-2 to finish season at 24-1)

OHSAA State Runner-up

1979 - (d. New Madison Tri-Village 11-2 & lost to Jeromesville Hillsdale 1-4 to finish the season at 19-1)
1988 - (d. Sycamore Mohawk 10-0 & lost to Strasburg-Franklin 0-14 to finish the season at 27-3)

OHSAA Final Four Appearances (besides the Championships and Second Place Finishes)

1978 - (lost to Jeromesville Hillsdale 5-0)
1984 - (lost to Arcanum 10-4)
1986 - (lost to Archbold 5-4)
2007 - (lost to Triad 13-3 to finish season at 22-5)

OHSAA Softball Tournament Records

Most Runs (Game, One Team) - Portsmouth Clay (Division III) 21 v. Beverly Fort Frye, 1981
Most Hits (Game) - Portsmouth Clay (Division III) 19 v. Archbold, 1980
Most Hits (Game) - North Lewisburg Triad (Division IV) 13 v. Portsmouth Clay, 2007
Most Hits (Game, Both Teams) - Portsmouth Clay (Division III) 28 v. Archbold, 1980
Teresa Ruby - played in first four OHSAA state softball tournaments (1978-1981), coach (2007)

- East (Sciotoville Community)

Boys' Baseball -

OHSAA State Championship

1973 (East def. Adena Buckeye West 5-3)

- Eastern Pike

Boys' Golf

OHSAA Division III State Championship Appearance

2006

- Franklin Furnace Green

Boys' Basketball

OHSAA Final Four Appearance

1939

- Minford

Girls' Softball

OHSAA Runner-up

1997 - (d. LaGrange Keystone 1-0 & lost to Tallmadge 7-0 to finish season at 27-4)

OHSAA Final Four Appearances (besides the Second Place Finish)

1994 - (lost to LaGrange Keystone 2-0)
1996 - (lost to Alliance Marlington 4-0)

- New Boston

Boys' Basketball

OHSAA Final Four Appearances

1938
1960 - (Salem Local d. New Boston 67-59)
2021 (Columbus Grove d. New Boston 58-53)

- Notre Dame

Football - 1967 & 1970 Associated Press state championships

- Oak Hill

Girls' Basketball

OHSAA Runner-ups

2004 - (Youngstown Ursuline d. Oak Hill 66-52)
2009 - (South Euclid Regina d. Oak Hill 63-48)
2011 - (Anna d. Oak Hill 50-32)

Boys' Basketball

OHSAA State Championship

2009 - ( d. Kalida 48-43 2OT)

- South Webster

Boys' Basketball

OHSAA State Championship

2006 - (d. Lockland 61-58 & d. Columbus Grove 83-65)

OHSAA Final Four Appearances

2004 - (Holgate d. South Webster 31-28)

- Symmes Valley

Boys' Basketball (as Waterloo High School before consolidation, "Waterloo Wonders")

OHSAA State Championship

1934 - (d. Lowellville 43-32 & d. Mark Center 40-26)
1935 - (d. Fremont St. Joseph 48-21 & d. Oxford Stewart 25-22)

OHSAA Final Four Appearances (besides the Championships)

1941

Girls' Softball

OHSAA State Runner-up

2005 (d. Cortland Maplewood 3-2 & lost to Convoy Crestview 6-4 to finish season at 28-5)

- Lucasville Valley

Boys' Baseball

OHSAA State Championship

1975 (Valley def. Russia 5-0)

Girls' Softball

OHSAA Final Four Appearances

1993 - (lost to North Robinson Colonel Crawford 9-3)
1994 - (lost to Jeromesville Hillsdale 6-1)

- Waverly

Boys' Baseball

OHSAA State Championship

1954 (Waverly def. Sycamore 2-1)

Boys' Basketball

OHSAA Final Four Appearance

1970 (Dayton Chaminade d. Waverly 73-55)
1973 - Associated Press Class AA Boys' Basketball Poll Champion (17-1)

- Portsmouth West

Football

Division IV State Final Appearance

2002 (Kenton def. Portsmouth West 45-13)

Girls' Softball

OHSAA State Runner-up

1987 - (d. Marion Elgin 4-3 & lost to Akron Hoban 5-1 to finish season at 22-6)
1988 - (d. Newark Licking Valley 5-4 & lost to Tallmadge 16-2 to finish season at 28-1)

OHSAA Final Four Appearances (besides the Second Place Finishes)

1986 - (lost to Newark Licking Valley 11-1)
1989 - (lost to Springfield Northwestern 8-4)
1998 - (lost to Keystone LaGrange 2-1)
1999 - (lost to Keystone LaGrange 1-0)
2000 - (lost to Lima Bath 3-2)
2001 - (lost to Keystone LaGrange 3-0)
2002 - (lost to Springfield Kenton Ridge 4-0)
2003 - (lost to Convoy Crestview 5-0)

- Wheelersburg

Boys' Baseball
OHSAA State Championships

1996 - def. Middlefield Cardinal 4-1
2012 - def. Lima Central Catholic 1-0
2013 - def. Bloom-Carroll 5-4

Boys' Basketball

OHSAA State Runner-up

1984 - (d. Willard 70-64 & lost to Akron St. Vincent - St. Mary 75-71 to finish season at 23-5)
1995 - (d. Columbus Bishop Hartley 76-60 & lost to Orrville 79-50 to finish season at 23-4)

OHSAA Final Four Appearances

1982 - Youngstown Rayen d. Wheelersburg 61-45)
1989 - (Cincinnati North College Hill d. Wheelersburg 71-67 (2OT))
2006 - (Cleveland Cleveland Villa Angela-St. Joseph d. Wheelersburg 71-62)
2007 - (Cincinnati North College Hill d. Wheelersburg 69-66 (OT))

OHSAA State Basketball Tournament Records

Largest Margin of Victory - Championship Game (Division III) - Orrville 79 d. Wheelersburg 50 in 1995
Most Two-Point Field Goals - Championship Game - Orrville (35) v. Wheelersburg in 1995
Most Two-Point Field Goals, Both Teams - Championship Game - 53 (Orrville 35 & Wheelersburg 18) in 1995
Most Rebounds - Championship Game - Orrville (44) v. Wheelersburg in 1995

Football

OHSAA State Championship

1989 (def. Warren John F. Kennedy 14-7)
2017 (def. Pemberville Eastwood 21-14OT)

Girls' Softball

OHSAA State Runner-up

2004 (d. Archbold 2-1 & lost to Woodsfield Monroe Central 1-0 to finish season at 25-6)

OHSAA State Championship

2016 (d. Johnstown-Monroe, 1-0, within the state semifinals, and then d. South Range, 8-3, within the championship final. The Pirates finished the season 26-2.

== Conference awards and championships ==
Conference Awards & Championships in each Sport

== Notable coaches' and player awards ==
- Terri Boldman (Clay) - Clay Coaches' Hall of Fame, one of only two S.O.C. coaches to lead girls' basketball team to OHSAA Final Four (1980)
- Ed Cable (Northwest) - Recipient of the Ohio Sportsmanship, Ethics, & Integrity Softball Coaches' Award (2002)
- Odie Estep (Willow Wood Symmes Valley) - Ohio Softball Coaches' Hall of Fame (2007)
- Arch Justus (Clay, Minford & Valley) - Ohio Basketball Coaches' Hall of Fame, Clay Coaches' Hall of Fame, won 532 total basketball games
- David Leightenheimer (Clay) - Clay Coaches' Hall of Fame & OHSAA Officials' Hall of Fame
- Kinney Long (Clay) - Clay Coaches' Hall of Fame
- Ed Miller (Notre Dame & Wheelersburg) - Ohio Football Coaches' Hall of Fame (1996), won two Associated Press state titles with Notre Dame in 1967 and 1970 and a Division IV OHSAA title with Wheelersburg in 1989
- Teresa Ruby (Clay) - played in the first four OHSAA state softball Final Four tournaments (1978–1981), won two state softball championships (as a player) in 1980 & 1981 and finished second in 1979, played in the 1980 girls' basketball Final Four, led her softball team (as a coach) to the 2007 state Final Four, holds many Clay basketball records (including leading scorer), has her number (#14) retired by the school. She also has a star on the Portsmouth Wall of Stars (2009).
- Carol Vice (Clay) - Clay Coaches' Hall of Fame, Ohio High School Fastpitch Softball Coaches Association Hall of Fame (2010); Star on Portsmouth's Wall of Stars, made it to the Final Four in softball 9 of 10 years as a coach, won three OHSAA state softball titles (1980, 81, & 83) while also finishing as runners-up twice (1979 & 1988), only softball coach from S.O.C. to win a softball title
- Norm Persin - Oak Hill Basketball - voted National Basketball Coach of The Year in 2009.

== External links & gallery ==
Member Schools & Websites

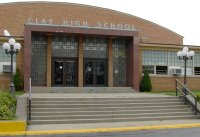
Portsmouth Clay HS

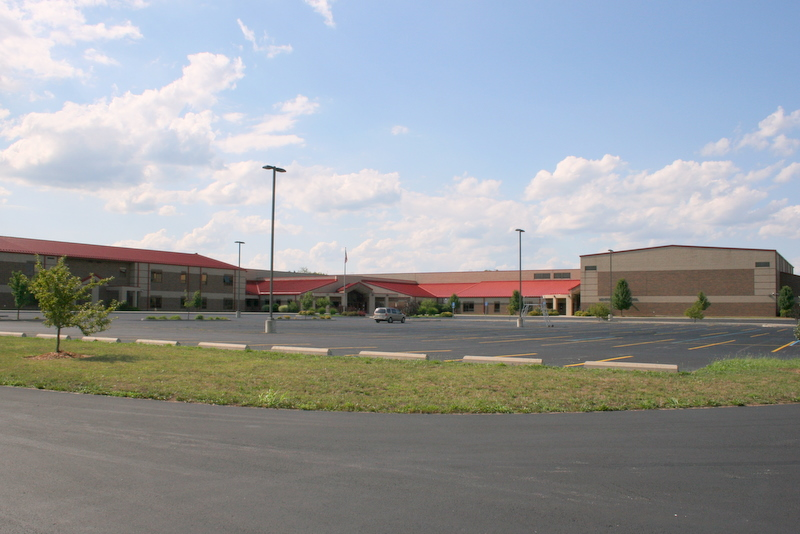
Minford HS

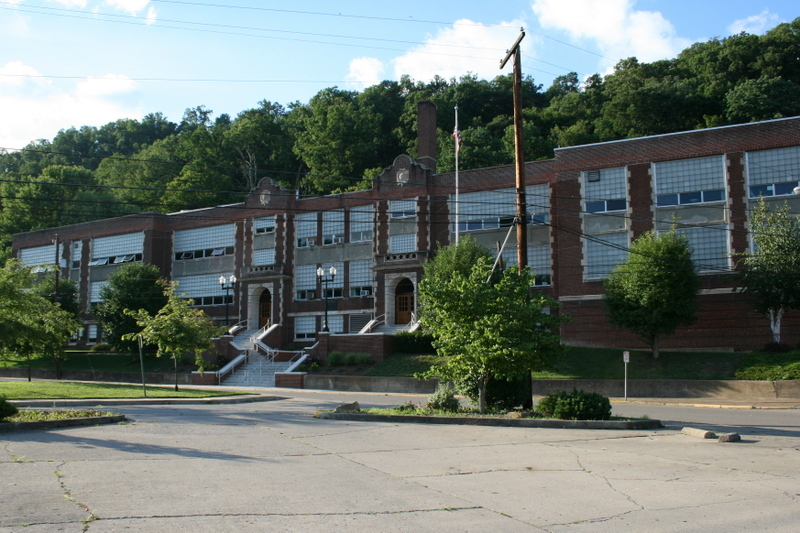
Glenwood HS

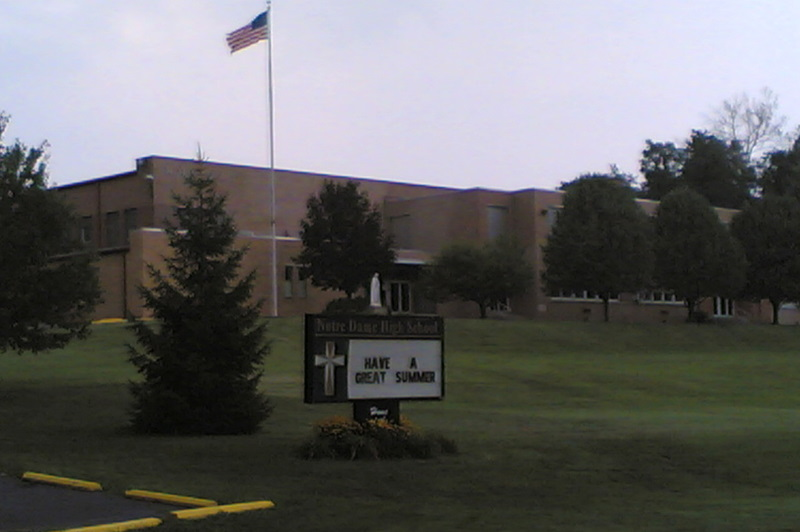
Notre Dame

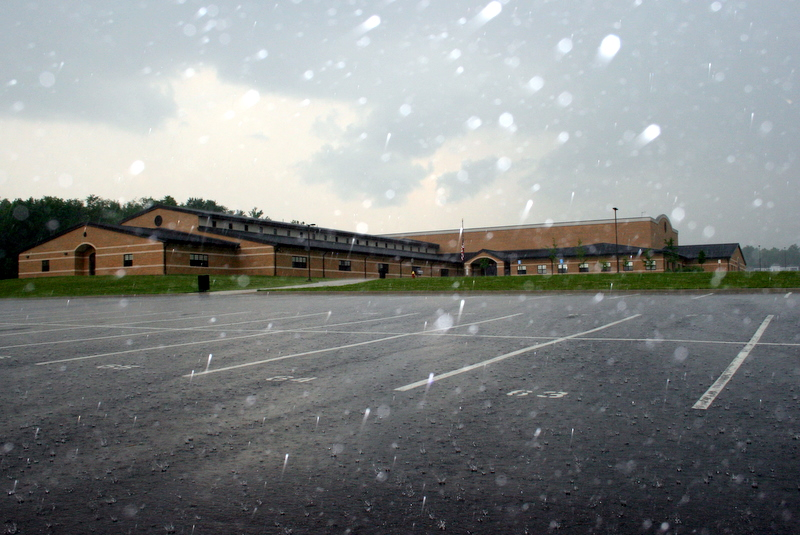
Oak Hill HS

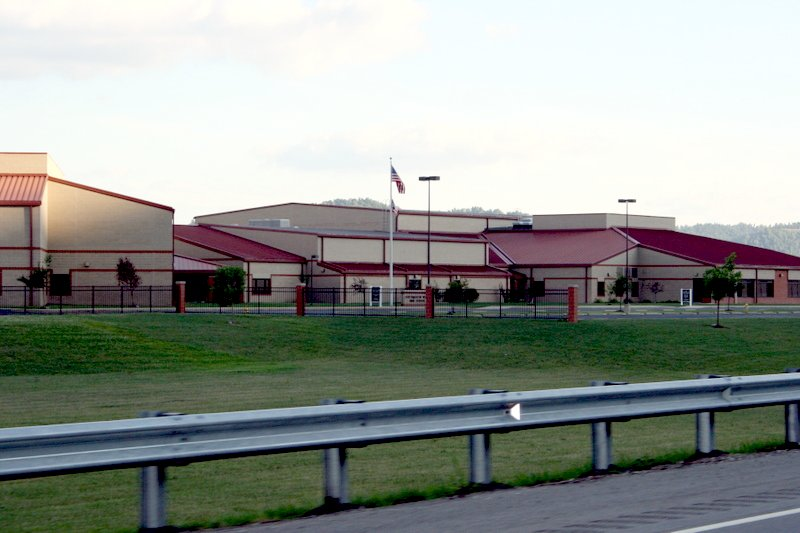
Portsmouth West HS

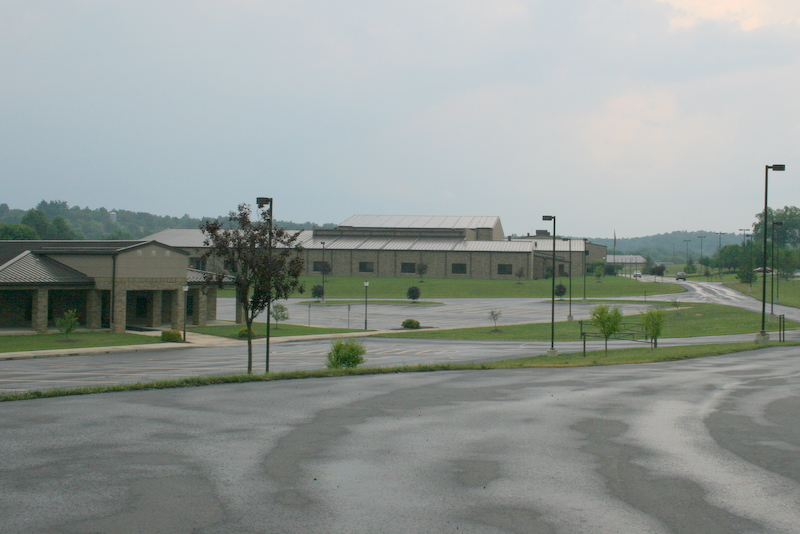
South Webster HS

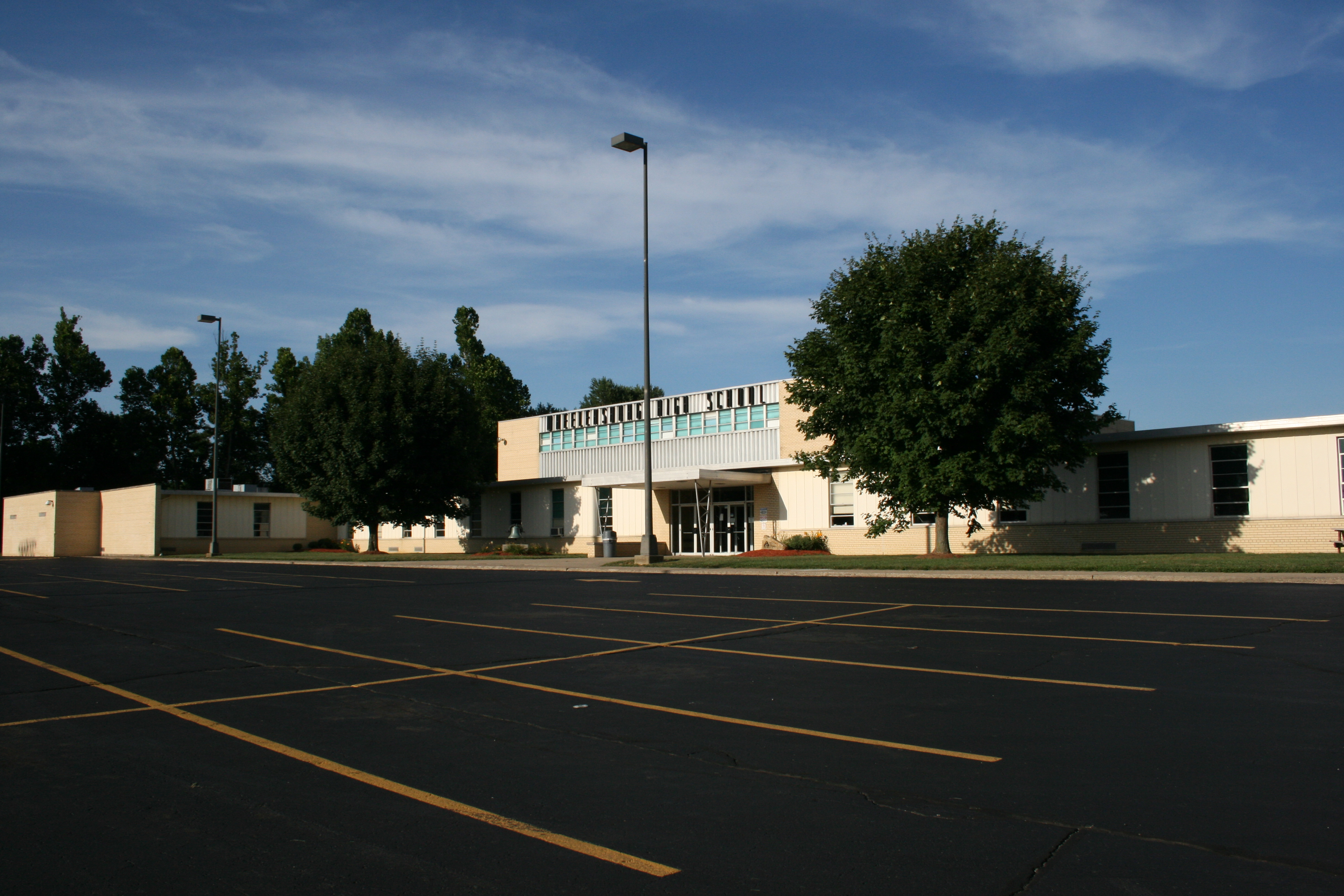
Wheelersburg HS
- Sciotoville Community East
- Eastern Pike
- Green
- McDermott Northwest
- Willow Wood Symmes Valley
- Lucasville Valley
- Waverly
- Western Pike
- History of the Southern Ohio Conference
