= Northwest Local School District (Scioto County) =

School district in Ohio, United States

Address
- 800 Mohawk Drive Mc Dermott, Ohio, 45652; United States

District information
- Type: Public
- Grades: PK–12
- Established: 1958; 68 years ago
- Schools: 3
- NCES District ID: 3904963

Students and staff
- Students: 1,126 (2024–2025)
- Teachers: 87.32 (on an FTE basis) (2024–2025)
- Staff: 157.53 (on an FTE basis) (2024–2025)
- Student–teacher ratio: 12.90 (2024–2025)
- District mascot: Mohawks

Other information
- Website: www.nwmohawks.org

Northwest Local School District is located in Scioto County, Ohio. The district enrolls public school students from Brush Creek township, Morgan township, Rarden township, Rush township, and Union township.

== Schools ==
As of 2024, Northwest Local serves 3 schools:

- Northwest Elementary School (PK-5)
- Northwest Middle School (6-8)
- Northwest High School (9-12)
