= Northwest Local School District (Stark County, Ohio) =

School district in Ohio, United States

Address
- 2309 Locust Street South Canal Fulton, Ohio, 44614; United States
- Coordinates: 40°54′N 81°36′W

District information
- Type: Public
- Motto: "Fiscally Responsible... Quality Academic Education"
- Grades: KG–12
- Established: 1956; 70 years ago
- Schools: 4
- NCES District ID: 3904990

Students and staff
- Students: 1,636 (2024–2025)
- Teachers: 111.35 (on an FTE basis) (2024–2025)
- Staff: 224.49 (on an FTE basis) (2024–2025)
- Student–teacher ratio: 14.69 (2024–2025)
- District mascot: Indians

Other information
- Website: www.northwest.sparcc.org

Northwest Local Schools is a school district located in Stark County, Ohio. The district enrolls students from City of Canal Fulton, Village of Clinton (Summit County), Lawrence Township and City of New Franklin (Summit County).

== Schools ==
- Northwest Primary School (K-2)
- W.S. Stinson Upper Elementary School (3-5)
- Northwest Middle School (6-8)
- Northwest High School (9-12)
