= Arcanum High School =

Location
- 2011 Trojan Avenue; Arcanum, (Darke County), Ohio 45304; United States
- Coordinates: 39°59′41″N 84°33′15″W

Information
- Type: Public, Coeducational high school
- School district: Arcanum-Butler Local Schools
- Superintendent: John Stephens
- Principal: Jason Stephan
- Teaching staff: 19.58 (FTE)
- Grades: 9-12
- Student to teacher ratio: 19.77
- Colors: Orange & Black
- Athletics conference: Western Ohio Athletic Conference
- Team name: Trojans
- Website: http://www.arcanum-butler.k12.oh.us

Arcanum High School is a public high school in Arcanum, Ohio. It is the only high school in the Arcanum-Butler Local School District.

== Ohio High School Athletic Association State Championships ==
- Boys Basketball – 1956, 1969
- Boys Track and Field - 1969
