= Glenwood High School (Ohio) =

Coordinates: 38°45′37″N 82°55′47″W

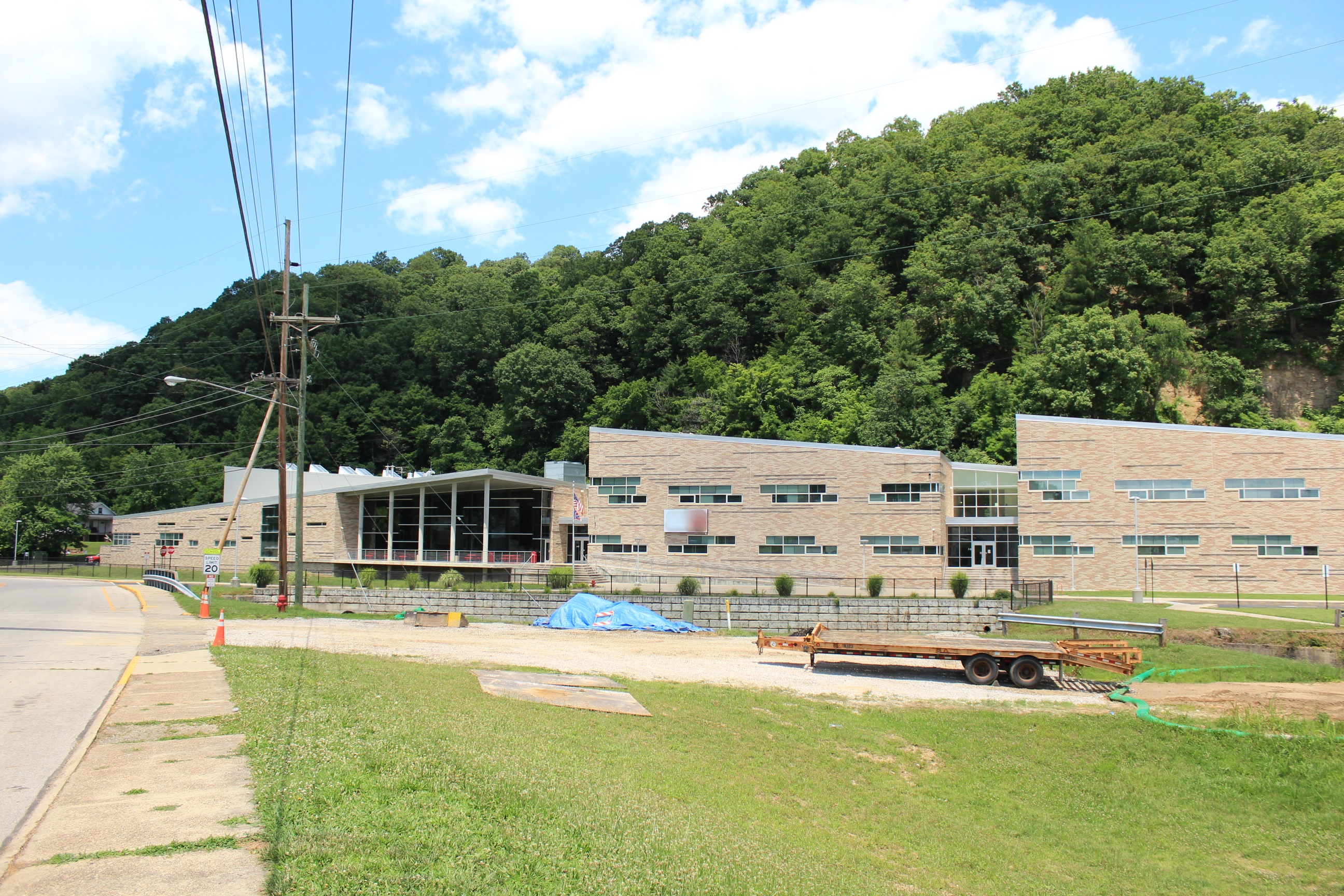
- Home of the Tigers
- 1 Glenwood Tiger Trail; New Boston, Ohio; United States

Information
- Type: Ohio, public, rural, high school
- School district: New Boston Local School District
- Superintendent: PJ Fitch
- Principal: Jeff Pica
- Faculty: 14.25 (on an FTE basis)
- Grades: 7–12
- Enrollment: 139 (2023–24)
- Student to teacher ratio: 9.75
- Colors: Scarlet and gray
- Athletics conference: Southern Ohio Conference
- Mascot: Tigers
- Website: Home page

Glenwood High School (GHS) is a public high school in New Boston, a village located in Scioto County in the southern part of the U.S. state of Ohio. It is the only high school in the New Boston Local School District. Their mascot is the Tiger, and their colors are scarlet and gray.

== History ==
The New Boston School District consisted of three schools until recently. The buildings constructed in the early 1900s included Stanton Elementary, Oak Street Intermediate, and Glenwood Junior-Senior High School. Glenwood housed grades 7-12, yet it was once the only school in the district and housed all grades.

In 2008, voters of New Boston approved a 7.61 mil levy to build a new $20 million Pre-K through 12 school building on #1 Glenwood Tiger Trail, which used to be Lakeview Avenue. The former Sun and Funland Pool once sat on the same location. The school purchased the land from the pool for $34,000. The local share of the $20 million school was only $3 million, and the rest is provided by the Ohio School Facilities Commission.

The school broke ground in February 2010 and opened in time for the 2012 school year. This is the first new school building built for New Boston since 1906.

== Academics ==
In 2009, the New Boston School District was identified by the Ohio Department of Education as being among the top 30 districts in the state for students with special needs.

== Athletics ==
Glenwood High School's athletic affiliation is with the Ohio High School Athletic Association (OHSAA) and the Southern Ohio Conference, Southeastern District.

As of 2020–2021 Glenwood High School offers the following extracurricular athletic teams for their student-athletes: basketball (boys' and girls', grades 7-12), cheerleading, soccer, volleyball (grades 7-12), softball, tennis, and track (grades 7-12).

== Notable alumni ==
- Vern Riffe Jr. - Longest running Speaker of the Ohio House of Representatives
