= Oak Hill High School (Ohio) =

Oak Hill High and Middle School
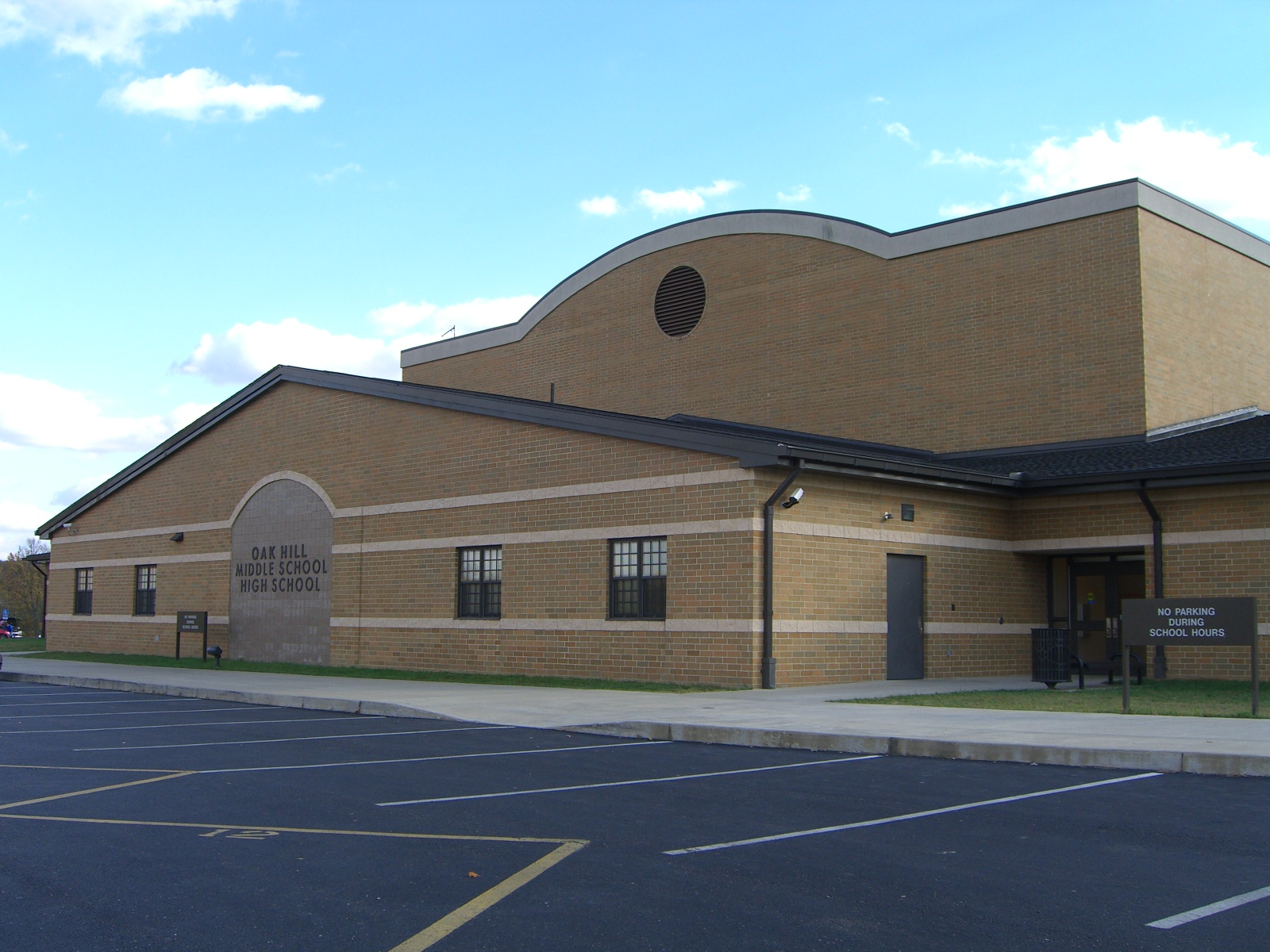

Location
- 5063 State Route 93; Oak Hill, Ohio 45656; United States
- Coordinates: 38°54′26″N 82°34′16″W

Information
- Other name: OHHS
- Type: Public high school
- School district: Oak Hill Union Local School District
- NCES School ID: 390477604623
- Principal: Whitney Crabtree and Joshua Donley
- Teaching staff: 30.00 (on an FTE basis)
- Grades: 6–12
- Enrollment: 590 (2023-2024)
- Student to teacher ratio: 19.67
- Campus type: Rural
- Colors: Black, White, Red
- Athletics conference: Southern Ohio Conference
- Mascot: Archie the Acorn
- Nickname: Oaks
- Website: www.oakhill.k12.oh.us
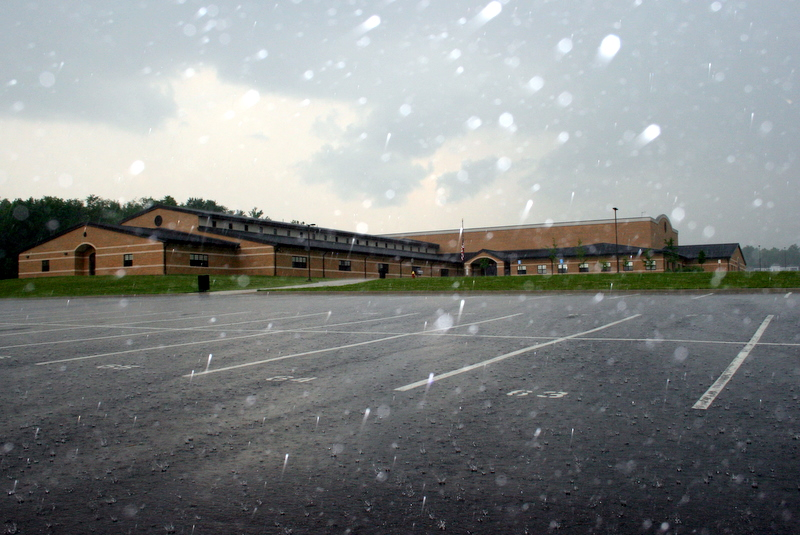
- View of school in July 2007.

Oak Hill High School (OHHS) is a public high school in Oak Hill, Ohio, United States. It is the only high school in the Oak Hill Union Local School District. The high school and elementary school are both located just north of the city limits on Route 93.

== Athletics ==
The school's athletic affiliation is with the Ohio High School Athletic Association (OHSAA) and the Southern Ohio Conference (SOC), which has seventeen member schools and is divided into three divisions (SOC I, SOC II, & SOC III). The SOC includes teams from four different Ohio counties.
