= Eastern High School (Beaver, Ohio) =

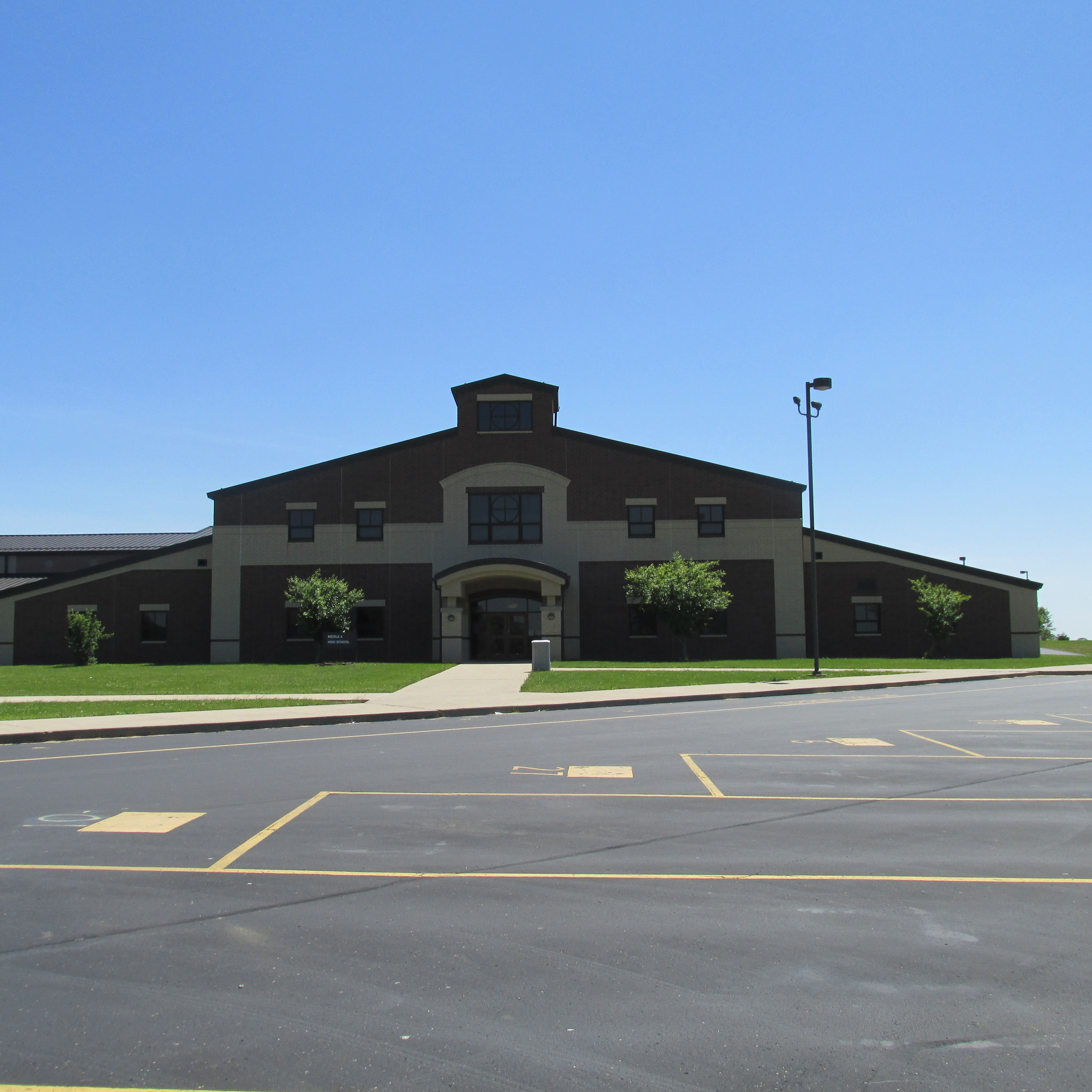

Location
- 1170 Tile Mill Road; Beaver, Ohio 45613; United States; 39.033928°N 82.844244°W

Information
- Type: Ohio, public, rural, high school
- Established: 1959; 67 years ago
- School district: Eastern Local School District
- Superintendent: Rick Bowman
- NCES School ID: 390491203499
- Principal: Robie Day
- Grades: 9-12
- Enrollment: 168 (2023-2024)
- Student to teacher ratio: 11.20
- Colors: Brown, white and orange
- Athletics: baseball, boys and girls basketball, boys and girls cross country, boys and girls golf, softball, football, boys and girls track, and girls volleyball
- Athletics conference: Southern Ohio Conference
- Mascot: Eagles
- Website: District Website

Eastern High School (EHS) is a public high school in Beaver, Pike County, in Southern Ohio. It is the only high school in the Eastern Local School District. The mascot is the Eagle and the school colors are brown and white.

== History ==
The Eastern Local School District was officially formed on October 5, 1959 by a vote of the Pike County Board of Education. The district was a consolidation of the Beaver, Stockdale, and Union Local School Districts. The district covers approximately 107 square miles. Most of the district is located in Pike County with portions extending into both Jackson and Scioto counties.

The newly formed Eastern district built a new high school near the intersection of Tile Mill Road and Beaver Pike. The district, for many years, utilized the Beaver and Stockdale buildings for grades K-8, and the new high school for grades 9-12.

In 1997, voters approved a bond issue to fund the local portion of a state-sponsored project that resulted in the construction of the current facility. That facility, which houses all grades, opened 2002, and is also located on the Tile Mill property. Upon completion of the new K-12 facility, the Beaver and Stockdale buildings were note razed. Those buildings, no longer owned by the district, served their respective communities in a variety of non-school capacities.

Currently, the district serves over 950 students, including a portion of the juniors and seniors who attend the Pike County Career Technology Center. The district employs over 120 staff members, including administrators, teachers, and support personnel such as custodians, cooks, bus drivers, secretaries, and aides.

== Academics ==
Eastern High School is currently rated as "Effective" per the Ohio Department of Education for the 2010-2011 school year.

== Athletics ==
The school's athletic affiliation is with the Ohio High School Athletic Association (OHSAA) and the Southern Ohio Conference (SOC), which has seventeen member schools and is divided into two divisions (SOC I & SOC II) based on the schools' enrollment.

See also Ohio high school athletic conferences and Southern Ohio Conference

=== Ohio High School Athletic Association championships and appearances ===
- Boys Golf - OHSAA Division III State Championship Appearance - 2006
- Girls Volleyball - OHSAA Division IV State Semi-Finalist - 2012
