= Waverly High School (Ohio) =

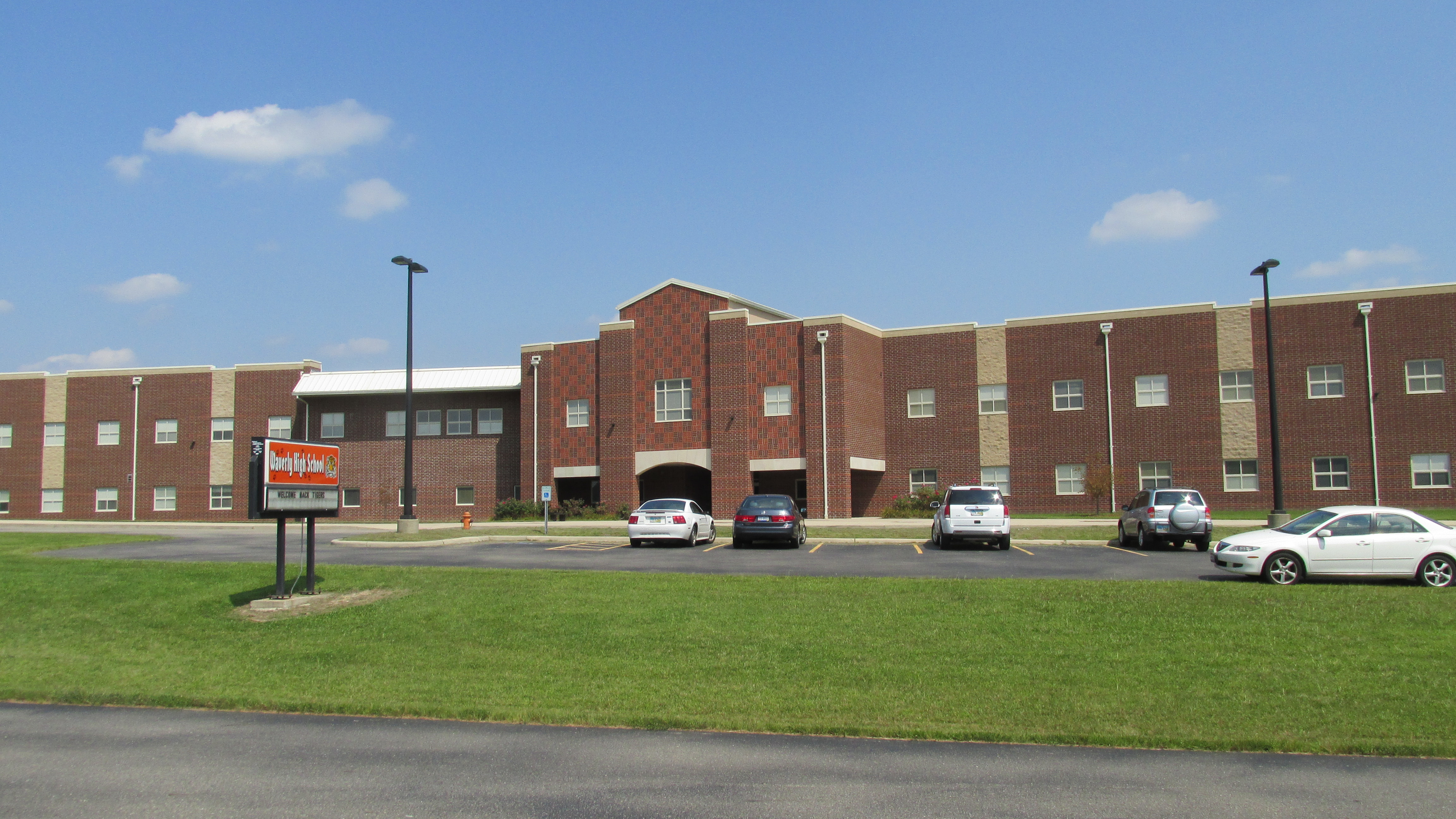

Location
- 1 Tiger Drive; Waverly, Ohio 45690; United States; 39°07′53″N 82°59′53″W

Information
- Type: Public high school
- School district: Waverly City School District
- NCES School ID: 390491403506
- Principal: Sara Ramsey
- Teaching staff: 38.00 (on an FTE basis)
- Grades: 9-12
- Enrollment: 483 (2022-2023)
- Student to teacher ratio: 12.71
- Colors: Orange and black
- Athletics conference: Southern Ohio Conference
- Mascot: Tiger
- Website: www.waverly.k12.oh.us

Waverly High School (WHS) is a public high school in Waverly, Ohio, United States. It is the only high school in the Waverly City School District.

== Music and Arts ==
Groups in the Arts at Waverly High School:

Drama Club, Jazz Band, Literature Club, Madrigals, Polarity (disbanded), Select Art, The Waverly Marching Tigers, WHS Concert Band, WHS Concert Choir, WHS Musicals, WHS Pep Band

Polarity, WHS pop a cappella group, received third place in the national a cappella competition, Harmony Sweepstakes, in May 2019. They have since been disbanded.

The Waverly Marching Tigers, the marching band, went to Hawaii for the 2025 Pearl Harbor day parade in December 2025.

== Athletics ==
The school's athletic affiliation is with the Ohio High School Athletic Association (OHSAA) and the Southern Ohio Conference (SOC).

=== Ohio High School Athletic Association championships and appearances ===
- Boys' Baseball – 1954 (Waverly def. Sycamore 2–1)
- Boys' Basketball - OHSAA Final Four Appearance - 1970 (Dayton Chaminade d. Waverly 73–55)

1973 - Associated Press Class AA Boys' Basketball Poll Champion (17-1)
2021-2022 - OHSAA Final Four Appearance
(Gilmour Academy d. Waverly 58-43)

== Notable alumni ==
- John Shoemaker, baseball coach
