= Notre Dame High School (Portsmouth, Ohio) =

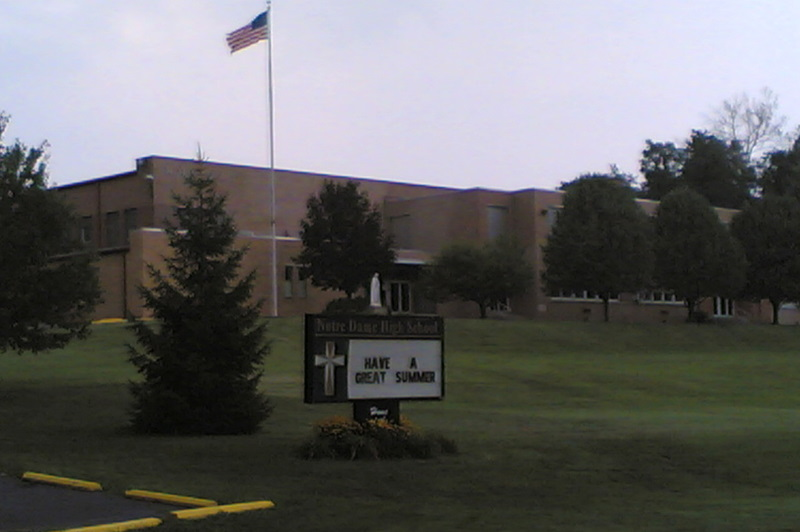

Location
- 2220 Sunrise Avenue; Portsmouth, Ohio 45662; United States; 38°45′0″N 82°59′9″W

Information
- Type: Private high school
- Religious affiliation: Roman Catholic
- Established: 1952 as Portsmouth Central Catholic
- Oversight: Roman Catholic Diocese of Columbus
- NCES School ID: 01060182
- Principal: Cullen Harris, Interim
- Teaching staff: 13.9 (on an FTE basis)
- Grades: 7–12
- Gender: Co-educational
- Enrollment: 95 (2022-2023)
- Student to teacher ratio: 11.8
- Hours in school day: 6.5
- Colors: Navy blue and gold
- Fight song: Notre Dame Victory March
- Athletics conference: Southern Ohio Conference
- Mascot: Titans
- Nickname: Titans
- Accreditation: Ohio Catholic School Accrediting Association
- Website: www.notredameschools.com

Notre Dame High School is a private, Roman Catholic high school in Portsmouth, Ohio, United States. It is a part of the Roman Catholic Diocese of Columbus. Notre Dame was founded in 1952 as a consolidated diocesan high school after the closure of Holy Redeemer High School and St. Mary High School. The building was added onto in 1966 to include a chapel, priest residences, and additional classroom space.

== Academics & activities ==
- Mock Trial
- National Honor Society
- Ohio Model United Nations
- Pep Club
- Quiz Bowl
- Student Council
- Yearbook
- Key Club
- Builder's Club
- Mass Choir

== Athletics ==
There are ten school districts and eleven high schools in Scioto County along with one diocesan high school as well several private and community schools. The school's athletic affiliation is with the Ohio High School Athletic Association (OHSAA) and the Southern Ohio Conference (SOC), which has seventeen member schools and is divided into two divisions (SOC I & SOC II) based on the schools' enrollment. Notre Dame is currently in SOC I.

Notre Dame participates in baseball, boys' and girls' basketball, boys' and girls' cross country, football, boys' golf, fast-pitch softball, boys' and girls' swimming, boys' and girls' tennis, boys' and girls' track & field, and girls' volleyball.

See also Ohio High School Athletic Conferences and the Southern Ohio Conference.

=== State championships ===
- Softball - 2025, 2026

== Notable alumni, coaches, and faculty ==
- Chuck Ealey — football star
