= Green High School (Franklin Furnace, Ohio) =

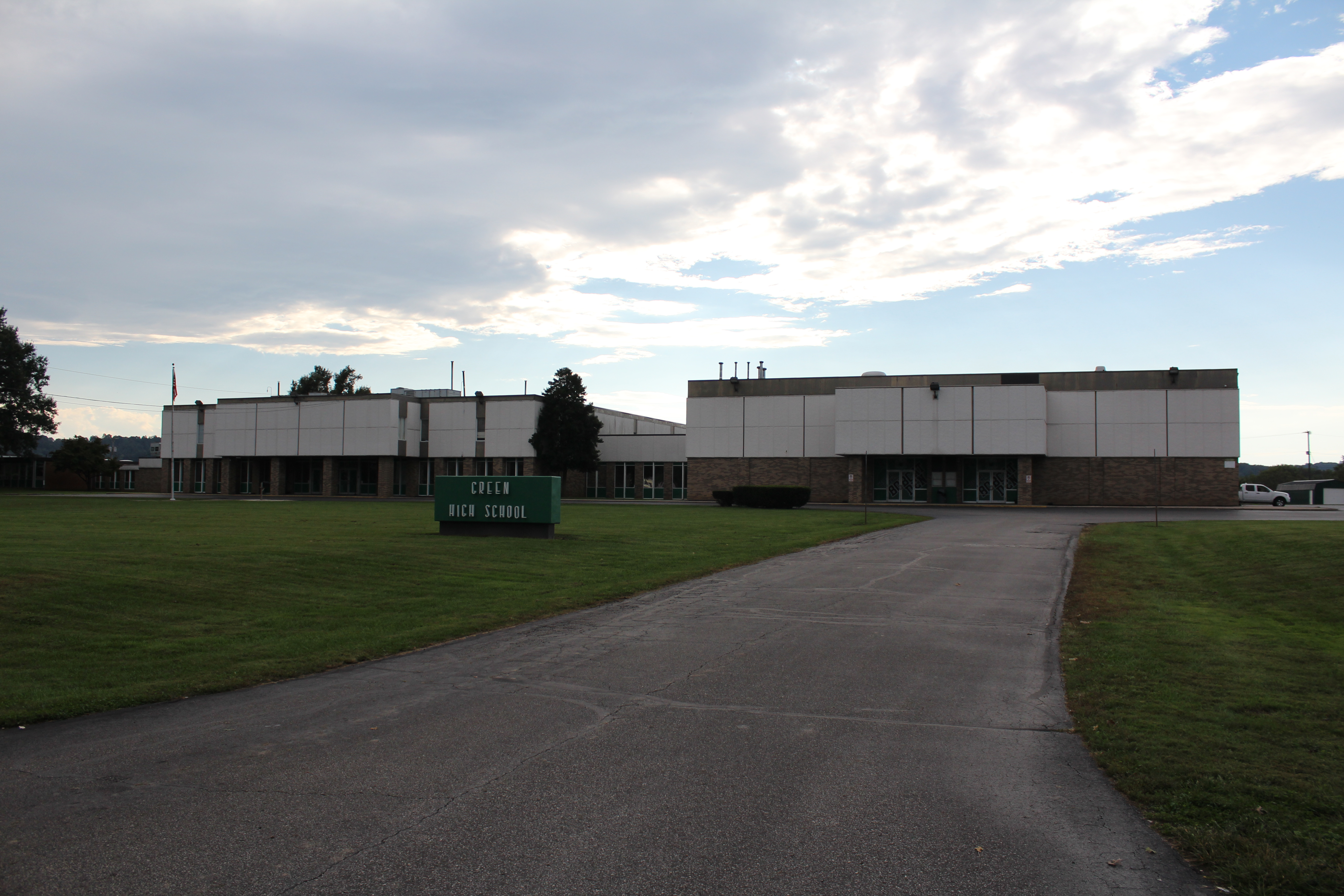

Location
- 4070 Gallia Pike; Franklin Furnace, Ohio 45629; United States; 38°37′10″N 82°50′40″W

Information
- Type: Public
- School district: Green Local School District
- Superintendent: Jodi Armstrong
- Principal: Jarod Shaw
- Teaching staff: 15.00 (FTE)
- Grades: 7–12
- Enrollment: 217 (2023-2024)
- Student to teacher ratio: 14.47
- Colors: Kelly green, white and black
- Athletics conference: Southern Ohio Conference
- Team name: Bobcats
- Website: www.greenbobcats.com

Green High School (GHS) is a rural, public high school located in Franklin Furnace, Ohio, United States. It is the only high school in the Green Local School District. The school mascot is the bobcat and the school colors are green and white. The school fight song is adopted originally from Northwestern University, titled "Go Northwestern Go". The superintendent of the school district is Jodi Armstrong.

== History ==
The current Green High School campus was completed in 1973. In 2018, voters in the school district passed a bond issue to construct a new campus for the schools.

== Athletics ==
There are ten school districts and eleven high schools in Scioto County along with one parochial school as well several private and community schools. The school's athletic affiliation is with the Ohio High School Athletic Association (OHSAA) and the Southern Ohio Conference (SOC), which has seventeen member schools and is divided into two divisions (SOC I & SOC II) based on the schools' enrollment. The SOC includes teams from four different Ohio counties:

== Gallery ==
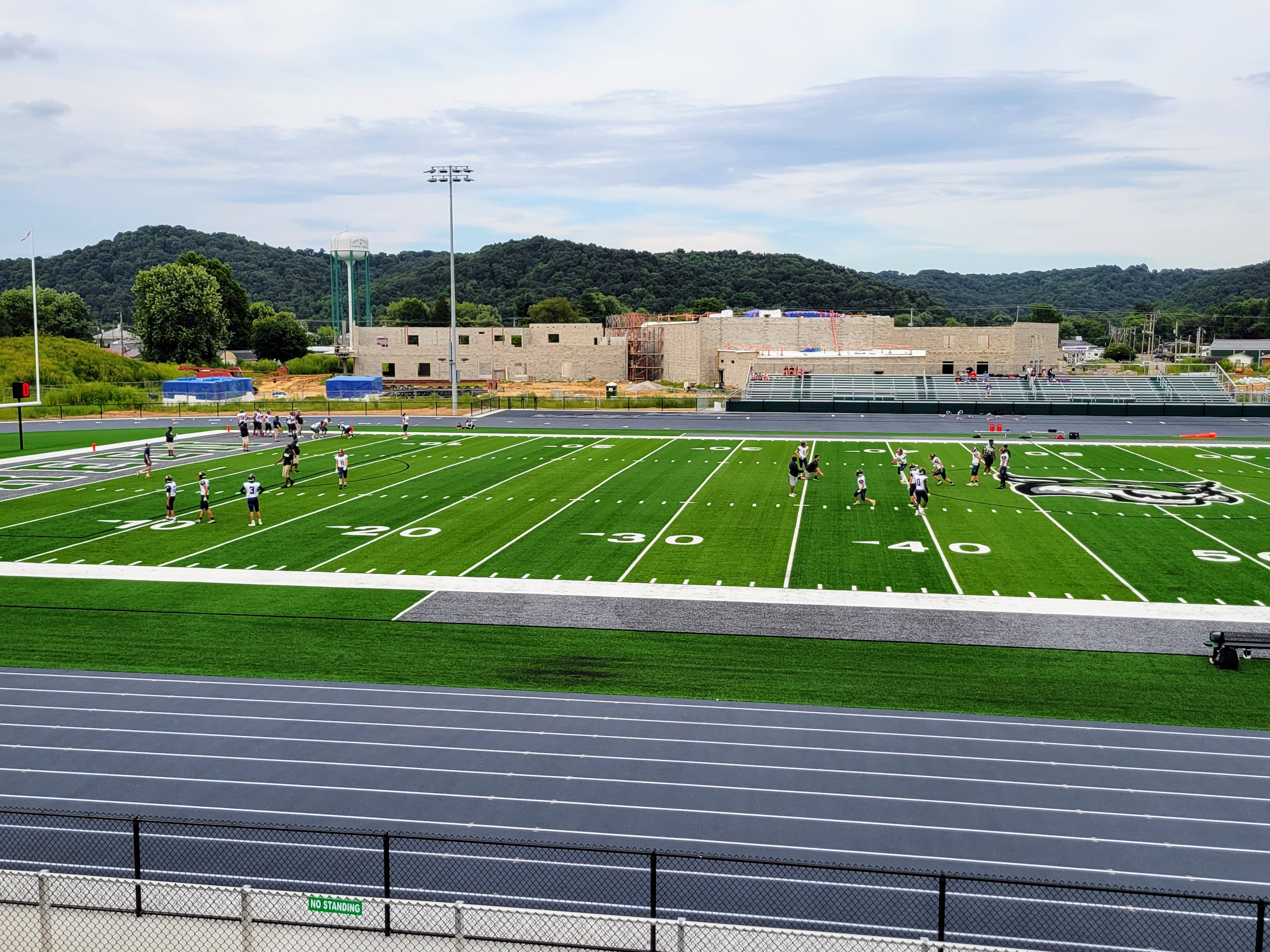
Prior to the first game at Green's new field on Aug. 20, 2022 vs. Fairfield Christian Academy. The new high school has been built behind the field.
