= Minford High School =

Public school in Ohio, United States

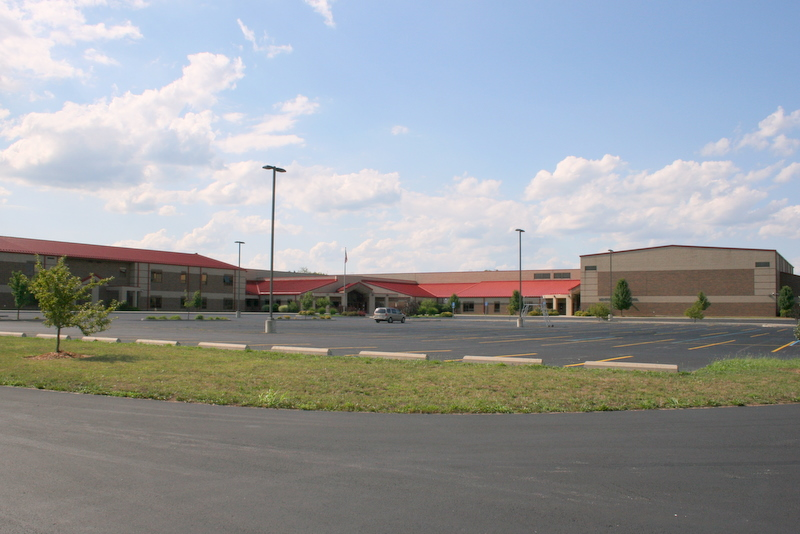

Location
- 491 Bond Road; Minford, Ohio 45653; United States; 38°51′40″N 82°51′12″W

Information
- Type: Ohio, public, rural, high school
- Established: 1923
- School district: Minford Local School District
- Principal: Jeff Pica
- Head of school: Jeremy Litteral, Superintendent
- Teaching staff: 17.00 (FTE)
- Grades: 9-12
- Enrollment: 362 (2023-2024)
- Student to teacher ratio: 21.29
- Colors: Scarlet and Gray
- Athletics: baseball, boys' and girls' basketball, boys' and girls' cross country, football, boys' and girls' tennis, boys' and girls' track, boys' and girls' soccer, fast pitch softball, boys' and girls' swimming, volleyball, and marching band
- Athletics conference: Southern Ohio Conference
- Mascot: Falcon (previously known as the Maroons until 1944)
- Website: www.minford.k12.oh.us/minfordhighschool_home.aspx

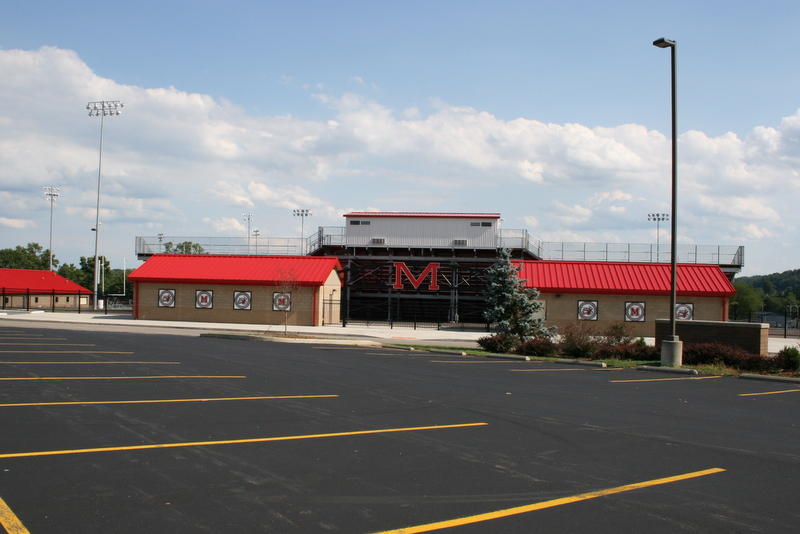
Minford High School Athletic Complex (football field)

Minford High School (MHS) is a rural, public, high school located in Minford in Scioto County in Southern Ohio. It is the only high school in the Minford Local School District. The school mascot is the falcon and the school colors are scarlet and grey.

== Brief history ==
The first high school was opened in 1923, but in 1971 it was turned into the middle school when the new high school was built. In the early 1980s the high school, having been built on top of a swamp, began to sink and the walls began to crack. In 2001 a new high school was built. The old high school was demolished and rebuilt upon pillars as the new elementary/middle school. The 1923 school was demolished and the land is now a commercial site (Desco Federal Credit Union).

== Athletics ==
There are ten school districts and eleven high schools in Scioto County along with one parochial school as well several private and community schools. The school's athletic affiliation is with the Ohio High School Athletic Association (OHSAA) and the Southern Ohio Conference (SOC), which has seventeen member schools and is divided into two divisions (SOC I & SOC II) based on the schools' enrollment. The SOC includes teams from four different Ohio counties.

=== State championships and appearances ===
- Girls' Softball

OHSAA Runner-up

1997 - (d. LaGrange Keystone 1-0 & lost to Tallmadge 7-0 to finish season at 27-4)

OHSAA Final Four Appearances (Other than Second Place Finish)

1994 - (lost to LaGrange Keystone 2-0)
1996 - (lost to Alliance Marlington 4-0)

- Golf

Bob Sowards - 1985 Low Medalist - State Champion AA

- Boys' Cross Country

OHSAA State Meet Appearances

1980
2000
