= Portsmouth West High School =

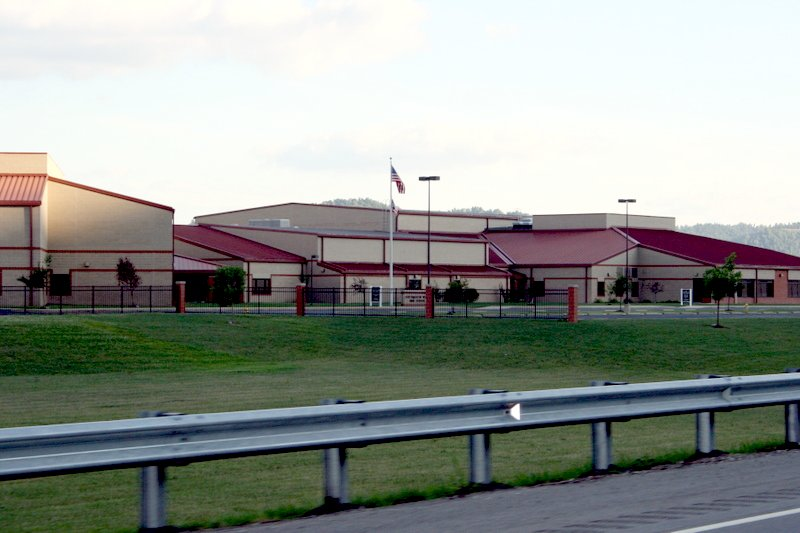
- Home of the Senators

Location
- 15332 U.S. Route 52; West Portsmouth, Ohio 45663; United States; 38°42′57″N 83°03′07″W

Information
- Type: Public
- School district: Washington–Nile Local School District
- Principal: Jason Kegley (2025)
- Grades: 9–12
- Enrollment: 336 (2023–2024)
- Campus type: Rural
- Colors: Black and Orange
- Athletics: Baseball, Basketball (B/G), Cheerleading, Cross Country (B/G), Football, Golf, Soccer (B/G), Softball, Swim Team, Tennis, Track, Volleyball (G)
- Athletics conference: Southern Ohio Conference
- Mascot: "Sider Sam"
- Team name: Senators aka Siders
- Website: www.westsenators.org/o/portsmouth-west-high-school

Portsmouth West High School (PWHS) is a public high school in Washington Township, just south of West Portsmouth, Ohio, United States. It is the only high school in the Washington–Nile Local School District. Athletic teams are known as the Senators, adopted when the school's official name was Washington High School, and the school colors are black and orange.

The school district serves residents primarily in Nile Township, which includes Friendship, and Washington Township, which includes West Portsmouth.

== Band ==
The Portsmouth West High School has a marching band, "The Sensational Senators", who play at football games, local parades, and compete at contests. PWHS hosts an annual OMEA adjudicated event called the "Southern Ohio Marching Band Classic" or the "West Contest".

== Choir ==
Portsmouth West High School offers several options to students who wish to participate in a choral ensemble. Students have the choice of General Choir and Chamber Choir in signing up for classes. For an extracurricular activity for the students, they may audition for select groups such as Advanced Choir, SMOW (Men's Ensemble), and Prima (Women's Ensemble). The Advanced Choir group regularly performs, by invitation, for local churches and for other community events. Each spring, the Vocal Music Department presents a full-scale musical theater production.

== Athletics ==
PWHS teams are known as the Senators and compete in the Ohio High School Athletic Association (OHSAA) as members of the Southern Ohio Conference (SOC), which has 18 member schools and is divided into two divisions (SOC I & SOC II & III) based on the schools' enrollment. The SOC includes teams from five Ohio counties. PWHS has teams in baseball, boys and girls basketball, boys and girls cross country, boys golf, football, boys soccer, boys and girls track, fastpitch softball, boys tennis, and girls volleyball

=== State finishes ===
The football team has made nine appearances in the OHSAA playoffs and finishing as state runners-up in Division IV in 2002 and advancing to the Division V semifinal in 2011. They have two undefeated regular seasons, in 1990 and 2008.

The softball team has made 10 appearances in the state semifinals, advancing to the state championship game twice, where they finished as state runners-up in 1987 and 1988.

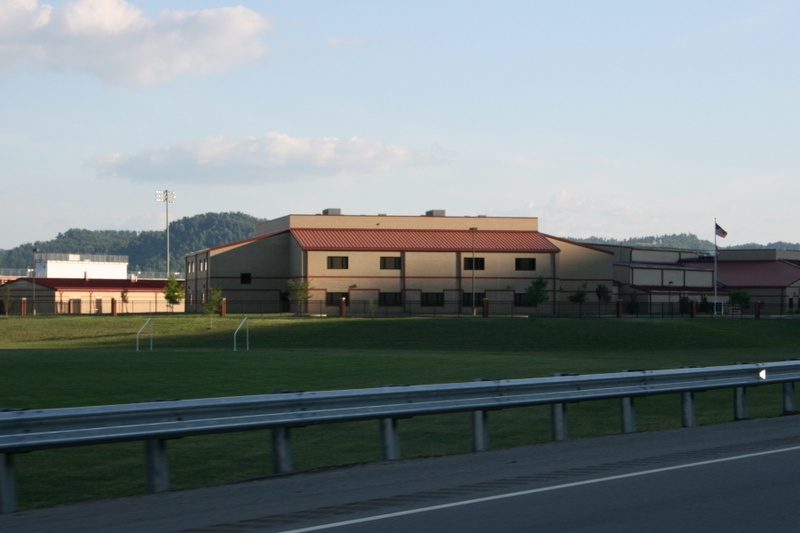
A view of PWHS from U.S. 52
