= Saint Joseph Central High School (Ironton, Ohio) =

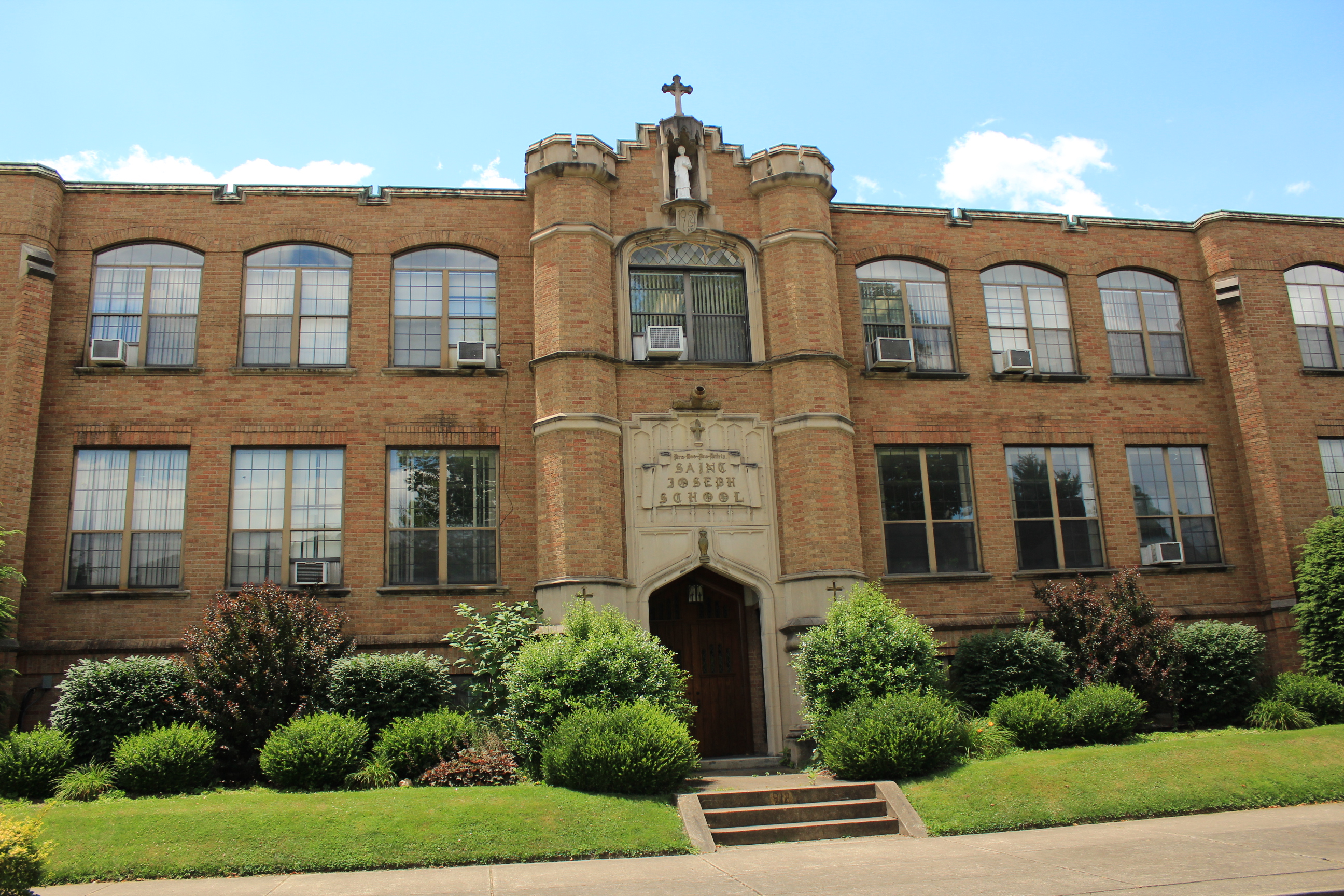

Location
- 912 South Sixth Street; Ironton, (Lawrence County), Ohio 45638; United States; 38°31′48″N 82°40′38″W

Information
- Type: Private, Coeducational
- Religious affiliation: Roman Catholic
- School board: Ironton Catholic Schools
- Oversight: Roman Catholic Diocese of Steubenville
- Principal: Chris Monte
- Grades: 7–12
- Colors: Purple and Gold
- Song: Saint Joe School Song
- Athletics conference: Southern Ohio Conference
- Sports: Soccer, Basketball, Baseball Cheerleading, Bowling, Golf, Track
- Mascot: The Flyer
- Team name: Flyers
- Rival: Portsmouth Notre Dame
- Newspaper: The Lamplighter
- Yearbook: The Lamp

Saint Joseph Central Catholic High School is a private, Catholic high school in Ironton, Ohio. It is operated by the Roman Catholic Diocese of Steubenville. The school's sports teams are known as the Flyers. In addition to housing the high school grades of 9-12, the school also houses junior high grades 7–8.
