= Ohio State Route 823 =

State highway in Scioto County, Ohio, US

State Route 823
- Southern Ohio Veterans Memorial Highway
- SR 823 highlighted in red

Route information
- Maintained by ODOT
- Length: 16.692 mi (26.863 km)
- Existed: December 14, 2018–present

Major junctions
- South end: US 52 in Sciotodale
- SR 140 near Sciotoville
- North end: US 23 in Lucasville

Location
- Country: United States
- State: Ohio
- Counties: Scioto

Highway system
- Ohio State Highway System; Interstate; US; State; Scenic
← SR 822	→ SR 824

State Route 823 (SR 823), officially known as the Southern Ohio Veterans Memorial Highway and colloquially as the Portsmouth Bypass, is a north–south four-lane divided controlled-access highway in Scioto County, Ohio. The highway, which runs from Sciotodale to Lucasville, reroutes through traffic around the cities of Portsmouth and New Boston to the east. The bypass provides better mobility within the local area for residents and has the potential to increase the economic development of the local area. In September 2013, the Ohio Department of Transportation (ODOT) recommended a public–private partnership (P3) to fund and build the highway. Construction began in June 2015. The highway was dedicated on December 13, 2018 with vehicle traffic beginning the next day.

== Route description ==
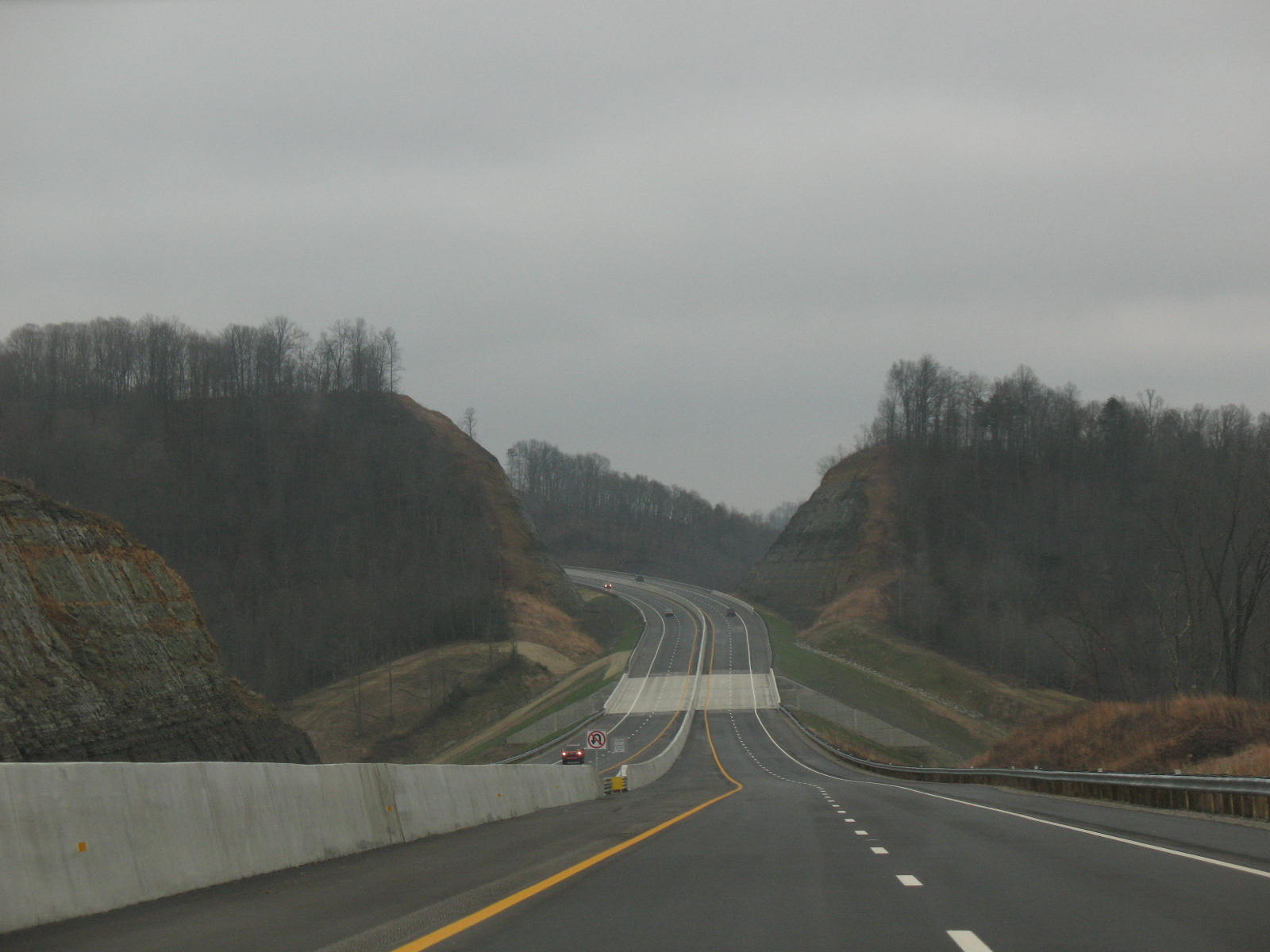
Ohio State Route 823 east of Lucasville

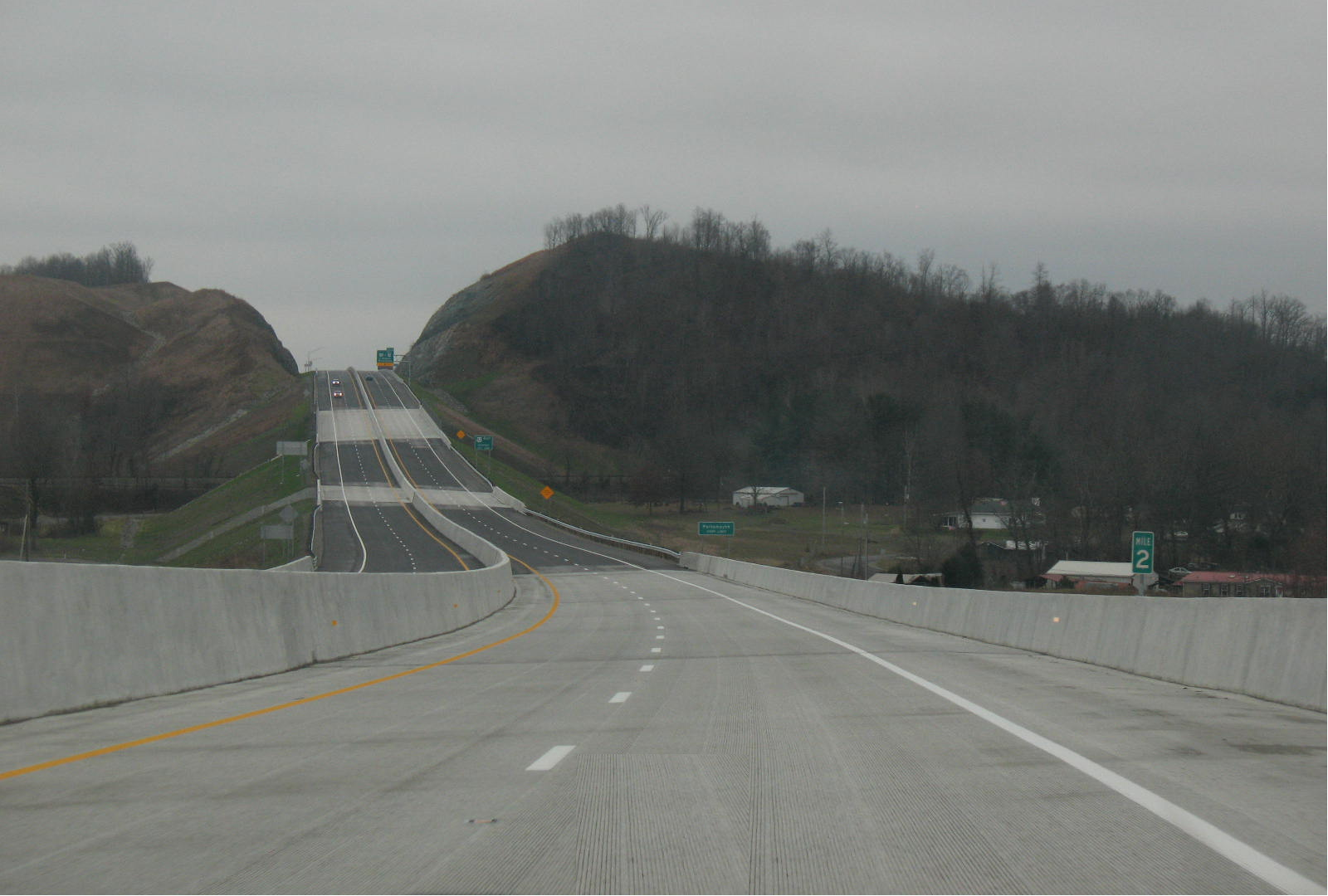
Ohio State Route 823 north of Sciotodale

The 16-mile-long (26 km) freeway bypasses the cities of Portsmouth and New Boston by connecting US 52 east of New Boston and west of Wheelersburg to US 23 north of Lucasville. SR 823 begins at a partial interchange with US 52 and heads north, passing through the communities of Minford, Lucasville, and Sciotodale before ending at a trumpet interchange with US 23. The freeway has three interchanges with local roads: SR 140 near the Portsmouth city limit, CR 234 (Shumway Hollow Road) adjacent to the Greater Portsmouth Regional Airport just south of Minford, and at CR 28 (Lucasville-Minford Road) in Minford.

== History ==
The proposal for a bypass began in the 1962 which called for the construction of a 8 mi (13 km) bypass designated as Ohio State Route 423 running north from Rosemount to east of Sciotoville. An engineering contract was awarded in the waning days of Governor Michael DiSalle's administration in 1963 which called for the construction of a 14.41 mi (23.19 km) bypass at a cost of $19.1 million. This was promptly terminated in the same year when Jim Rhodes assumed the governorship with the engineering firm citing that the bypass would not be under construction within two to three years. The proposed bypass was referred to as a part of Corridor B following the establishment of the Appalachian Development Highway System. The project languished for years as the bypass was "plagued with problems" with the state prioritizing the construction of Corridor D. It wasn't until 1998 that a $5 million environmental study was earmarked from federal transportation dollars. After three proposed routes, the hill alignment was chosen after ODOT conducted numerous studies concerning impact to the environment and local area.

=== Construction ===
The bypass was constructed in three general phases. Phase 1 connects Lucasville-Minford Road near Rases Mountain Drive to Airport Road (a newly relocated Shumway Hollow Road) adjacent to the Greater Portsmouth Regional Airport on SR 335—this phase was scheduled to take approximately three years to complete. In conjunction with the freeway construction, the 0.23-mile-long (0.37 km) section of relocated Shumway Hollow Road came under state maintenance as unsigned SR 823A. Phase 2 continues the freeway from the Lucasville-Minford Road interchange to US 23 just north of Lucasville. Phase 3 continues the freeway from the Shumway Hollow Road/Airport Road interchange in Minford to US 52 near Wheelersburg. The freeway did not open for traffic on completed sections but rather upon completion of the entire project in December 2018. The construction cost was initially projected to be $429 million in June 2015, had a total construction cost of $634 million when completed in December 2018. The state's share will be $1.2 billion over a 35-year period to construct and maintain the highway while servicing its debt.

== Exit list ==
The entire route is in Scioto County.

Location	mi	km	Exit	Destinations	Notes
Sciotodale	0.000	0.000	-	US 52 east – Ironton	Southbound exit and northbound entrance only
Sciotodale	0.963	1.550	1	SR 140 (Webster Street) to US 52 west	Southbound exit and northbound entrance only
Minford	6.453– 7.040	10.385– 11.330	7	CR 234 (Shumway Hollow Road) to SR 335	Diamond interchange; Shumway Hollow Road is unsigned SR 823A
Minford	9.346– 9.563	15.041– 15.390	9	CR 28 – Lucasville, Minford	Folded diamond interchange
Lucasville	16.374– 16.692	26.351– 26.863	16	US 23 – Chillicothe, Portsmouth	Trumpet interchange
1.000 mi = 1.609 km; 1.000 km = 0.621 mi: Incomplete access
