= Rubyville Elementary School =

Public elementary school in Ohio, U.S.

Coordinates: 38°49′13″N 82°56′18″W

former Rubyville Elementary School
- 3019 Maple Benner Road; Portsmouth, Ohio; United States

Information
- Type: (Ohio) public, rural, elementary school
- Motto: "Cognitiones Artes Habitus Virtutes"
- Established: 1940
- Principal: Tony Piguet, Elementary Principal
- Head of school: Anthony Mantell, Superintendent (Clay Local School District)
- Faculty: 9
- Grades: 4-6
- Enrollment: 140 (as of 2006)
- Colors: Royal Blue and gold
- Mascot: Panthers
- Information: 740-353-0272
- Website: Clay Local School District

Rubyville Elementary School was one of two elementary schools in the Clay Local School District in the far southern region of the U.S. state of Ohio. Rubyville Elementary (a.k.a. Rubyville) serves students in grades four through six. The building was located on Maple Benner Road at the intersection of State Route 139 in Scioto County's Clay Township. The other elementary building in the district was Rosemount Primary School (K-3) located on Rose Valley Road in Rosemount.

== Brief history ==
The Clay Local School District (CLSD) was created in 1940 to serve the residents of Clay Township and the individual communities of Eden Park, Rosemount, Rubyville, and Twin Valley. For those students who desired to go on to high school before the opening of the high school in 1940, the board of education provided their tuition to Glenwood High School or to Portsmouth High School. "There were buses to transport students to and from school, but there was no cafeteria, therefore, students brought their lunches." The first graduating class in 1940 was nicknamed the "Dirty Dozen" because there were twelve students that walked across the stage for the first time as Clay graduates.

The district began with four buildings—one high school and three elementary schools. There were two buildings in Rubyville—the current elementary building, which served as the high school from 1940–1956, and an elementary building (originally Sumers, later renamed Long Run School), which is now a local church. The district also had an elementary building in Eden Park, which still stands but is no longer used by the district, and one in Rosemount (Scioto Trail School), which was located on the current site of JW Village Market.

In 1956, the Rubyville building (built in 1939) became the elementary building. With a bond issue to raise $325,000 (along with matching funds for a total cost of nearly $600,000) a new high school building, which opened its doors on February 1, 1956, was built on Clay High Street. Mr. Carl Bandy was the Executive Head of the Clay (Rural) Local School District when the high school was built in 1955. At that time, the enrollment of the district was 719. One year later, it was 915. During the period of peak employment at the Atomic Plant in Piketon (now U.S.E.C.), the enrollment was 1100. A new elementary building was then built in Rosemount (Rosemount Primary, built in 1964).

The district currently uses a new PK-12 building constructed in 2010. In 1964 the Rosemount building was constructed, and a band room and junior high wing were added to the high school. In 1998 an additional "wing" was built on to the high school structure. Additional upgrades and renovations have occurred to all three buildings over the years including improvements to the high school gym, new science laboratories, renovations to all the restroom facilities, new roofs, and air conditioning for all three buildings. The enrollment for the district is currently 700.

== Photo gallery ==
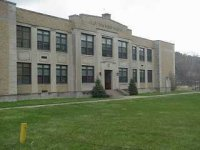
Rubyville Elementary (served as Clay High School from 1940 to 1956). The Clay Township High School was built as part of the Federal Emergency Administration of Public Works under President Franklin D. Roosevelt. At the time Harold L. Ickes was the administrator of the Public Works program.

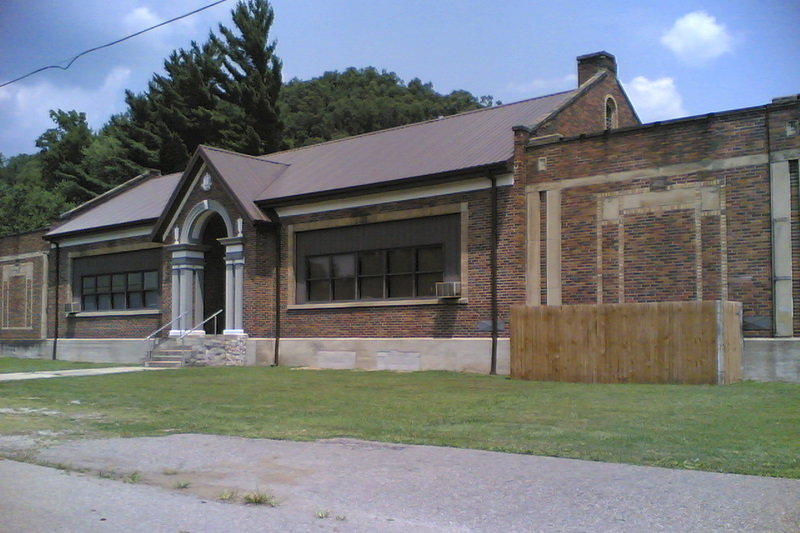
The former Eden Park Elementary School
