= Scioto =

Scioto is a word of Wyandot origin given to the Scioto River, which flows southwards from north central Ohio to the Ohio River.

Scioto may also refer to:

== Places ==
=== In Ohio ===
- Scioto River
- Little Scioto River (disambiguation), several flowing watercourses
- Scioto Audubon Metro Park, in Columbus
- Scioto Country Club, in Upper Arlington
- Scioto County, Ohio, at the confluence of the Scioto and Ohio rivers
- Scioto County Airport, a general aviation facility
- Scioto Furnace, Ohio, an unincorporated community in Scioto County
- Scioto Grange No. 1234, a historic building in Jackson
- Scioto Greenway Trail, in Columbus
- Scioto Mile, a collection of parks and trails in Columbus
  - Scioto Mile Fountain
  - Scioto Mile Promenade
- Scioto Ordnance Plant, a WWII-era incendiary munitions factory
- Scioto Peninsula, a land feature of the neighborhood of Franklinton (Columbus, Ohio)
- Scioto Township (disambiguation), several places
- Scioto Trail State Forest, in Pike and Ross counties

=== In other states ===
- Scioto Mills, Illinois, an unincorporated community in Stephenson County
- Sod, West Virginia (a.k.a. Scioto), an unincorporated community in Lincoln County

== Animals ==
- Scioto madtom (Noturus trautmani), an extinct species of freshwater fish
- Scioto pigtoe (Pleurobema bournianum), a species of freshwater mussel

== Other uses ==
- Scioto Company, a French land company, established 1787, which operated in America
- Scioto Lounge, a series of bronze sculptures in Columbus, Ohio
