= Clay High School (Portsmouth, Ohio) =

Public high school in Ohio, United States

Clay Junior-Senior High School
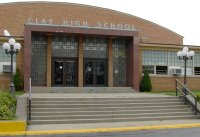

Location
- 44 Clay High Street; Portsmouth, Ohio 45662; United States
- 38.804°N 82.981°W

Information
- Type: Public, Coeducational high school
- Established: 1939
- School district: Clay Local School District
- Superintendent: W. Todd Warnock
- School code: 391002603644
- CEEB code: 364260
- Principal: Russ Breech
- Faculty: 23.00 (on FTE basis)
- Grades: 7-12
- Student to teacher ratio: 6.17
- Colors: Royal Blue and Gold
- Slogan: Cognitiones Artes Habitus Virtutes
- Athletics conference: Southern Ohio Conference
- Mascot: Panthers
- Team name: Panthers
- Athletic Director: Mark Rose
- Website: www.claylocalschools.org/our-schools/clay-high

Clay Junior-Senior High School is a public high school in Clay Township, Ohio, United States, located four miles (6 km) north of the Portsmouth in Scioto County. It is the only high school in the Clay Local School District. Clay is a rural high school serving about 300 students in grades 7–12 in Southern Ohio. The first class graduated in 1940.

Clay High School is now part of one building serving students in PK-12. The old high school building was one of three buildings used in the district from 1956 to 2010. Rubyville Elementary School (4-6), which was on Maple Benner Road at the intersection of State Route 139, and Rosemount Primary School (K-3), which was on Rose Valley Road just off Rosemount Road in Rosemount, Ohio, were the other two buildings.

== General information ==
The enrollment for Clay Junior-Senior High School, grades 7–12, is 300 with 190 students in grades nine through twelve. The school's mascot is the black panther while the school colors are royal blue and gold. Ninety-six (96.22) percent of the students that attend the school are white. The other four percent are Hispanic (1.15), African American (.82), multiracial (.82), Asian (.66), or American Indian (.33). The district covers 22.12 square miles (57.3 km^{2}). There are twenty-two full-time faculty members serving the 300 students. The athletes complete in the small division in every Ohio High School Athletic Association (OHSAA) sport. The school competes with ten (10) sports teams at the high school level and three at the junior high level. The school belongs to the OHSAA and to the Southern Ohio Conference - Division I (SOC I).

The district received communication from the Ohio School Facilities Commission on May 3, 2007, that the district had been approved for the state funds. After new Ohio legislation allowing the district to proceed, a bond issue was placed on the March 2008 ballot to build a new preK-12 facility. The ballot issue passed and the district began building a new facility. The actual groundbreaking was in the Spring of 2009.

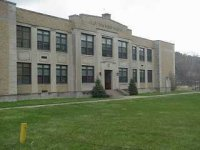
Rubyville Elementary (served as Clay High School from 1940 to 1956) The Clay Township High School was built as part of the Federal Emergency Administration of Public Works under President Franklin D. Roosevelt. At the time Harold L. Ickes was the administrator of the Public Works program.

== History ==
The Clay Local School District was created in 1940 to serve the residents of Clay Township and the individual communities of Eden Park, Rosemount, Rubyville, and Twin Valley. For those students who desired to go on to high school before the opening of the high school in 1940, the board of education provided their tuition to Glenwood High School or to Portsmouth High School. When the school was built in 1940 "there were buses to transport students to and from school, but there was no cafeteria, therefore, students brought their lunches." The first graduating class in 1940 was nicknamed the "Dirty Dozen" because there were twelve students who walked across the stage for the first time as Clay graduates.

The district began with four buildings - one high school and three elementary schools. There were two buildings in Rubyville - the Rubyville Elementary building, which served as the high school from 1940 to 1956, and an elementary building (originally Sumers, later renamed Long Run School), which is now a local church. The district also had an elementary building in Eden Park, which still stands but is no longer used by the district, and one in Rosemount (Scioto Trail School), which was located on the current site of JW Village Market.

In 1956, the Rubyville building (built in 1939) became the elementary building. With a bond issue to raise $325,000 (along with matching funds from the state and federal government for a total cost of nearly $600,000) a new high school building, which opened its doors on February 1, 1956, was built on Clay High Street. Mr. Carl Bandy was the Executive Head of the Clay (Rural) Local School District when the high school was built in 1955 . At that time, the enrollment of the district was 719. One year later, it was 915. During the period of peak employment at the Atomic Plant in Piketon (now U.S.E.C.), the enrollment was 1100. A new elementary building was then built in Rosemount (Rosemount Primary, built in 1964).

The district no longer uses these three buildings. At the time the Rosemount building was constructed in 1964, a band room and a junior high wing were added to the high school. In 1998 an additional "wing" was built on to the high school structure. Additional upgrades and renovations have occurred to all three buildings over the years including improvements to the high school gym, new science laboratories, renovations to all the restroom facilities, new roofs, and air conditioning for all three buildings. The enrollment for the district is currently 717.

== Campus ==
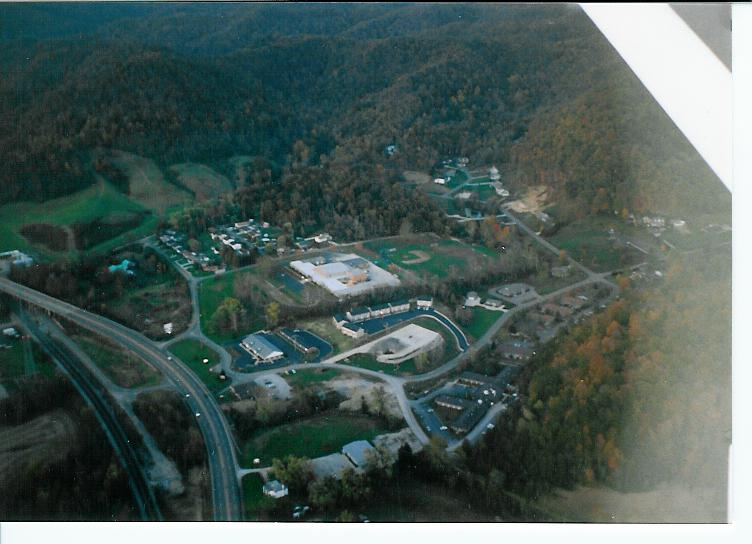
Clay Junior-Senior High School (aerial view, fall of 2003)

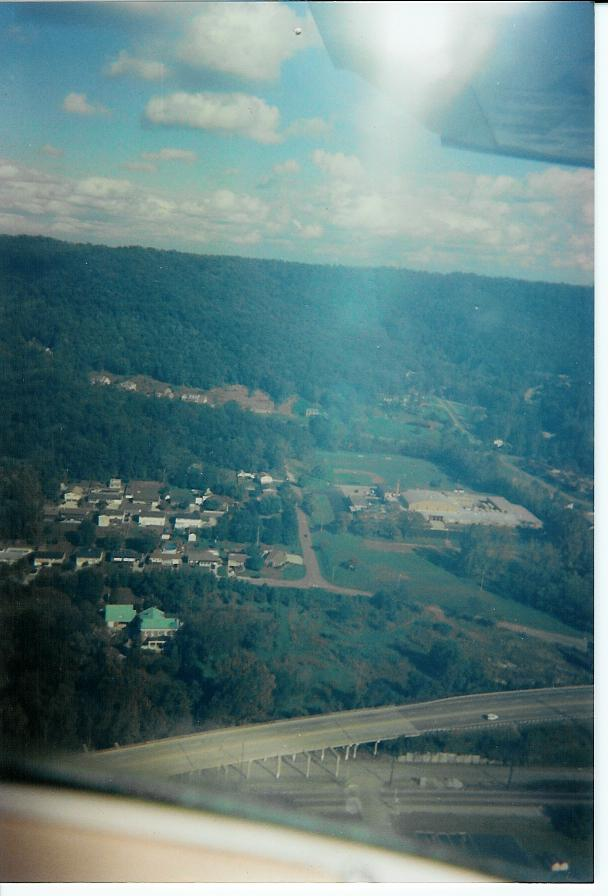
Clay Junior-Senior High School (aerial view, fall of 2003)

Clay Junior-Senior High School is located in the rolling hills of Southern Ohio (Appalachian Ohio) just north of the Ohio River near Portsmouth. The building and grounds are located on Clay High Street just off U.S. Route 23 and Lochner Road in Rosemount, which is nestled in a rural, community area of apartments, small businesses, homes, and farmland. The campus consists of several acres in which PK-12 building and several athletic fields (baseball and soccer) are located.

The old Clay Jr.-Sr. High School building was shaped somewhat as an "E" (facing east) from an aerial view. In the middle of the vertical arm was the main entrance, which faced west toward U.S. Route 23. The industrial arts and drafting rooms were located in the top wing while the lower arm (or "old junior high" wing) housed additional academic classrooms. The middle wing consisted of the cafeteria, band room, gymnasium, health facility, and the "new junior high" wing.

There were twenty-seven academic classrooms in the Clay High School building including three computer labs, an industrial arts shop and drafting room, a chemistry/physics lab, a biology lab, and a home economics lab. The district's superintendent and treasurer also have offices in the building. The CHS softball field is located on the grounds of the former Rubyville Elementary building. The school has new tennis courts (as of 2019) located on Rose Valley Road behind where the old Rosemount Elementary stood.

== Academics ==
Academically, Clay has a reputation as one of the better schools in Southern Ohio. The latest Ohio Department of Education report card indicated CHS met the graduation, AYP (average yearly progress), and attendance percentages/rates.

The school year is divided into two semesters for grading and course scheduling purposes, with a three-day finals schedule at the end of the year (see Academic term). The majority of the courses offered are year-long courses, but students have the opportunity to take a few courses on a semester basis. The school currently meets on a 47-minute, eight-period schedule in which students attend each class daily.

While student enrollment (198) and class sizes are small (17:1), Clay offers many opportunities for its students including both curricular and extracurricular activities. These academic opportunities include, but are not limited to, AP courses, Art I-IV, band, Chemistry I & II, chorus, computer applications, pre-engineering courses, economics, industrial arts, physics, senior composition, Spanish I-IV, and web page design.

Recent graduates of CHS have attended/graduated from such universities/colleges as Berea College, Eastern Kentucky University, Marshall University, Miami University, Morehead State University, Northern Kentucky University, Ohio University, Ohio Northern University, Purdue University, Shawnee State University, Ohio State University, Transylvania University, University of Cincinnati, University of Kentucky, Valparaiso University, St. Bonaventure University, the University of Dayton, Cornell University, West Point, Wittenberg University, and Wright State University. Clay's graduating classes, which average about 35 students, have received in excess of $300,000 each year in scholarship money. The 2007 Clay graduating class, for example, was offered close to $450,000 in scholarships.

Likewise, the CHS staff members have also attended/graduated from many of these same institutions. The CHS staff members have an average of 16 years of experience.

== Extracurricular activities ==
- Community & school-related service activities: American Red Cross blood drives, CF (cystic fibrosis) walks, health fairs, political campaigns, Sierra's Haven, and other acts of volunteerism.
- Other activities: Academic competition team (quiz bowl), band, Bible Club, cheerleading, Encore (show choir), CHS National Honor Society, the Clay Pep Club, student council, the venturing club, and the PNN news team.

== Athletics ==
Clay Junior-Senior High School is a "small division" school in every Ohio High School Athletic Association sports' division. The school participates in twelve OHSAA sanctioned sports - baseball, boys' and girls' basketball, boys' and girls' cross country, boys' golf, boys' soccer, girls' fast pitch softball, boys' tennis, boys' and girls' track and field, and girls' volleyball. The district also fields boys' and girls' basketball, boys' and girls' cross country, boys' and girls' track and field, and girls' volleyball teams in our junior high. The district also has baseball, golf, and softball as sports at the junior high level even though these teams are not recognized as official school teams.

There are ten school districts and eleven high schools in Scioto County along with one parochial school as well as several private and community schools. The school's athletic affiliation is with the Ohio High School Athletic Association (OHSAA) and the Southern Ohio Conference (SOC), which has seventeen member schools and is divided into two divisions (SOC I & SOC II) based on the schools' enrollment. The SOC includes teams from four different Ohio counties - Jackson County (Oak Hill High School), Lawrence County (Saint Joseph Central High School and Symmes Valley High School), Pike County (Waverly High School, Eastern High School, and Western High School), and Scioto County (Clay High School, Green High School, Glenwood High School, Sciotoville Community School, Valley High School, Northwest High School, Minford High School, Portsmouth West High School, Notre Dame High School, South Webster High School, and Wheelersburg High School).

=== Softball ===
In athletics, the Clay softball team has won three OHSAA State Championships—1980, 1981, & 1983. The team was 79–1 in those three years under the direction of Carol Vice, a member of the Clay Coaches' Hall of Fame. In 1979 and 1988, the softball team was runner-up. The softball team has won 23 league titles, 29 sectional titles, 20 district titles, and ten regional titles along with three state championship banners. The softball team is the only team from Scioto County ever to win a state championship. In fact, the team was in the Final Four in nine out of the 11 years from 1978 to 1988. Carol and Clay Vice have their names/stars on the Portsmouth Wall of Fame in honor of their success and contributions to the Portsmouth area. The team's last appearance in the state tournament was in 2007.

=== Boys' basketball ===
The boys' basketball team made it to the OHSAA Final Four in 1969 under the direction of Arch Justus, who is also a member of the Clay Coaches' Hall of Fame and the Ohio Basketball Coaches Hall of Fame. The team has also won 14 league titles (most recently in 2004–5), 23 sectional titles, three district titles, and one regional title.

=== Girls' basketball ===
The girls' basketball team went to the OHSAA Final Four in 1980. The team is still the only girls' Scioto County team and one of only two in the Southern Ohio Conference (Oak Hill being the other one) to reach that level. Terri Boldman, a member of the Clay Coaches' Hall of Fame and current high school assistant principal, guided the girls to the OHSAA Final Four. The girls' basketball team has won three league titles (1980, 2005, & 2005–06), 13 sectional titles, two district titles, and one regional title.

=== Baseball, golf, soccer, tennis, and volleyball ===
While softball, boys' basketball, and girls' basketball may have garnered the spotlight in years past, Clay teams have won numerous league, sectional, district, regional, and state titles. The boys' baseball team won the Regional title in 1944 and has also captured 21 conference titles, 8 sectional titles, and 5 district titles. The volleyball team has won seven league titles, 15 sectional titles, four district titles, and went to the regional tournament as recently as 2007. Most recently, the golf team won its ninth straight league title. The team also qualified for the state championships for three straight years between 2004 & 2006. The tennis team captured its first SOC title in 2005 and won it again in 2007 and 2008. In addition, the soccer team has won two league title and three sectional titles.

=== Ohio High School Athletic Association state championships, appearances, and records ===
- Boys' Basketball - OHSAA Final Four Appearance - 1969 (Arcanum def. Clay 76–61)
- Girls' Basketball - OHSAA Final Four Appearance - 1980
- Boys' Golf - OHSAA Division III State Championship Appearances - 2004, 2005, 2006
- Girls' Softball

OHSAA State Championships

1980 - (d. Archbold 18-6 & d. New Madison Tri-Village 12-3 to finish season at 25-0)
1981 - (d. Jeromesville Hillsdale 7-2 & d. Beverly Fort Frye 21-0 to finish season at 29-0)
1983 - (d. Pioneer North Central 8-7 & d. Mineral Ridge 6-2 to finish season at 24-1)

OHSAA State Runner-up

1979 - (d. New Madison Tri-Village 11-2 & lost to Jeromesville Hillsdale 1-4 to finish the season at 19-1)
1988 - (d. Sycamore Mohawk 10-0 & lost to Strasburg-Franklin 0-14 to finish the season at 27-3)

OHSAA Final Four Appearances (besides the Championships and Second Place Finishes)

1978 - (lost to Jeromesville Hillsdale 5-0)
1984 - (lost to Arcanum 10-4)
1986 - (lost to Archbold 5-4)
2007 - (lost to Triad 13-3 to finish season at 22-5)

OHSAA Softball Tournament Records

Most Runs (Game, One Team) - Portsmouth Clay (Division III) 21 v. Beverly Fort Frye, 1981
Most Hits (Game) - Portsmouth Clay (Division III) 19 v. Archbold, 1980
Most Hits (Game) - North Lewisburg Triad (Division IV) 13 v. Portsmouth Clay, 2007
Most Hits (Game, Both Teams) - Portsmouth Clay (Division III) 28 v. Archbold, 1980
Teresa Ruby - played in first four OHSAA state softball tournaments (1978-1981), coach (2007)

- Clay Championship Banners/Titles

=== School fight song ===
Words to the school fight song were written by Wanda Lake, a Clay alumna. The song's lyrics are sung to the tune of the trio section from the popular march, Military Escort, by Harold Bennett, a pseudonym of Cincinnati composer and bandmaster Henry Fillmore (1881-1956).

== Notable alumni ==
- Dale Bandy - He is a 1956 Clay HS graduate and the son of long time administrator, Carl Bandy. He went on to play baseball and basketball at Ohio University. He was an assistant under legendary OU basketball coach Jim Snyder before taking over the reins in 1974 (1974–1980). He currently lives in Texas half of the year. The other half of the year he lives in Pennsylvania and is an assistant men's basketball coach for the California University of Pennsylvania Vulcans' squad under Bill Brown.
