= Portsmouth Airport =

Portsmouth Airport may refer to:

- Greater Portsmouth Regional Airport (IATA:PMH, ICAO:KPMH), near Portsmouth, Ohio
- Portsmouth International Airport at Pease (IATA: PSM, ICAO: KPSM), near Portsmouth, New Hampshire
- Portsmouth Airport, Hampshire on Portsea Island, England
