= Ohio State Route 140 =

State highway in southern Ohio, US

State Route 140

Route information
- Maintained by ODOT
- Length: 20.74 mi (33.38 km)
- Existed: 1923–present

Major junctions
- West end: US 52 in Portsmouth
- East end: SR 93 near Oak Hill

Location
- Country: United States
- State: Ohio
- Counties: Scioto, Lawrence, Jackson

Highway system
- Ohio State Highway System; Interstate; US; State; Scenic
← SR 139	→ SR 141

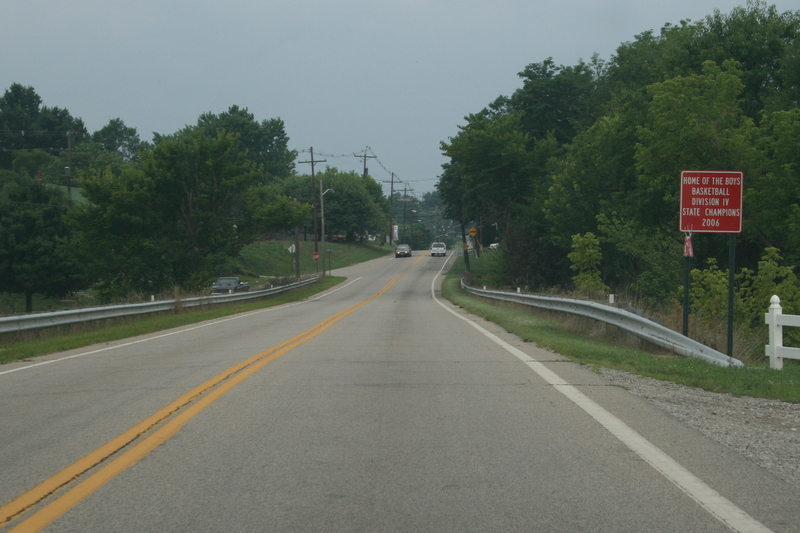
A view of SR 140 entering South Webster from the northeast

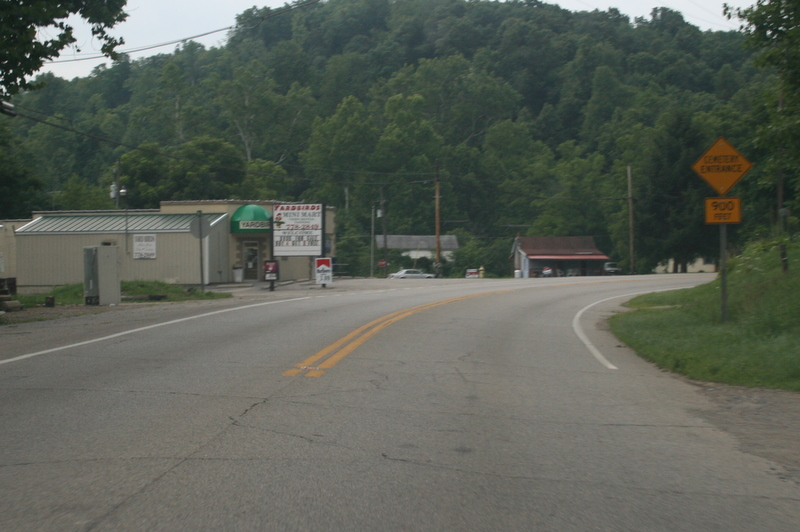
A view of SR 140 entering Scioto Furnace from the northeast

State Route 140 (SR 140) is an east–west state highway in the southern portion of the U.S. state of Ohio. The highway has its western terminus in Portsmouth at a diamond interchange with U.S. Route 52. Its eastern terminus is at State Route 93 approximately 2.75 miles (4.43 km) south of Oak Hill.

State Route 140 first appeared in the mid-1920s. The two-lane highway passes through three counties along its path: Scioto, Lawrence and Jackson. It begins at an interchange with U.S. Route 52 and, immediately following the interchange, leaves the Portsmouth corporation limits and heads east. The route makes a quick hilly climb upward and downward to the former Teays River Valley near Slocum; it then traverses primarily wooded areas as it passes through Ashley Corner, Scioto Furnace, South Webster, and Eifort. It retains the forested area up until its eastern terminus. For most of its alignment, State Route 140 parallels an abandoned Baltimore and Ohio Railroad line.

== Route description ==
Along its way, State Route 140 travels through eastern Scioto County, clips the northwestern corner of Lawrence County and then sneaks into southern Jackson County. State Route 140 is not a part of the National Highway System, a system of highways deemed most important for the nation's economy, mobility and defense.

== History ==
State Route 140 was established in 1923. The original routing of the highway is the one which it still utilizes to this day through Scioto, Lawrence and Jackson Counties. The highway has not experienced any major changes since its inception, excepting the highways that it intersects at its endpoints. Its western terminus, which is now U.S. Route 52, was originally a part of State Route 7. Meanwhile, its eastern terminus, which is currently State Route 93, was originally designated as State Route 75.

== Major intersections ==
County	Location	mi	km	Destinations	Notes
Scioto	Portsmouth	0.00– 0.18	0.00– 0.29	US 52 / Webster Street – New Boston, Ironton	Interchange
Scioto	Portsmouth	0.43	0.69	SR 823 (north) – Chillicothe	Interchange; northbound entrance only
Lawrence	No major junctions				
Jackson	Jefferson Township	20.74	33.38	SR 93 – Oak Hill, Ironton	
1.000 mi = 1.609 km; 1.000 km = 0.621 mi: Incomplete access
