= Minford, Ohio =

- Census-designated place
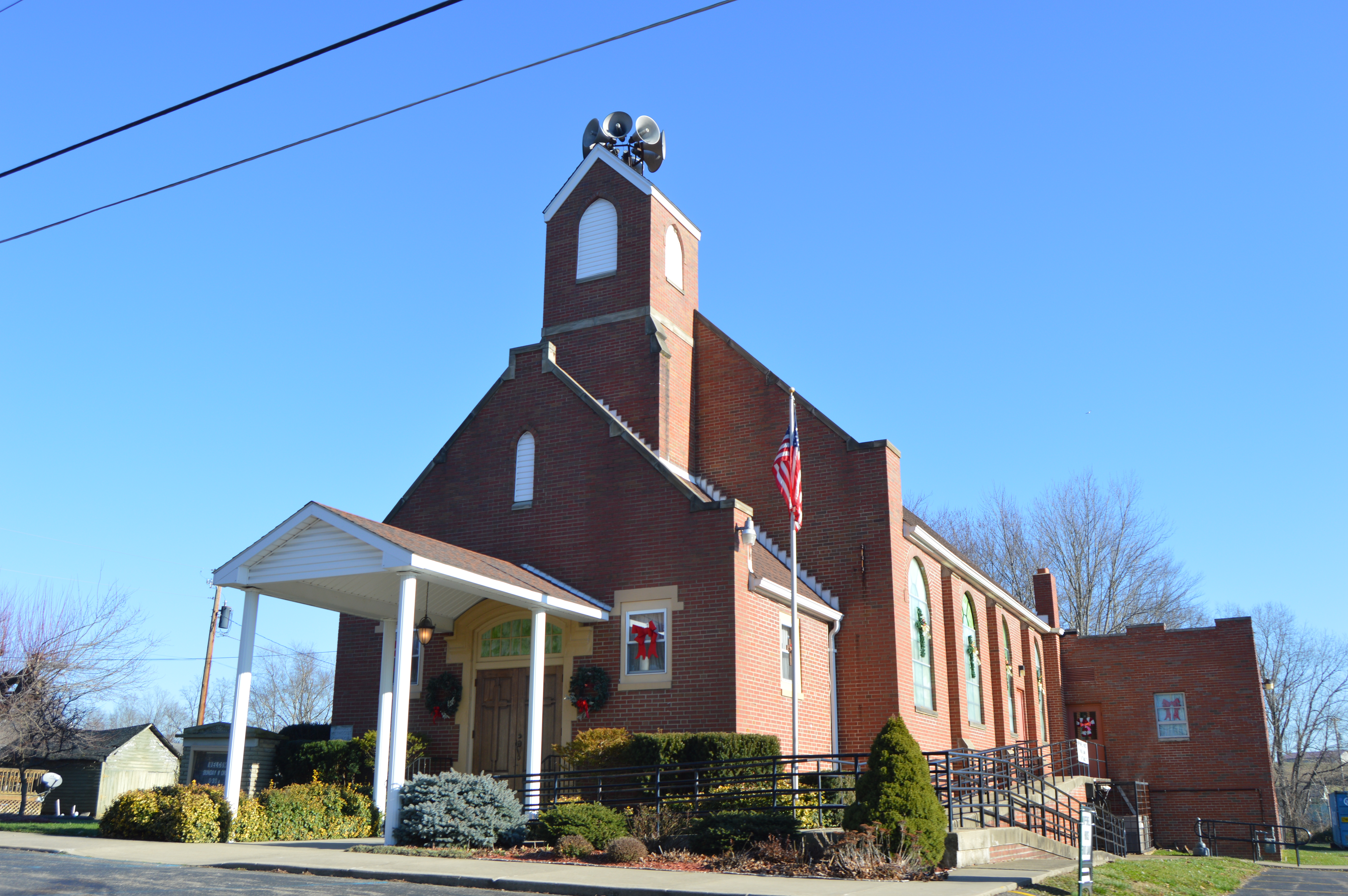
- Methodist church
- Nicknames: Hillhound City, Falcon City
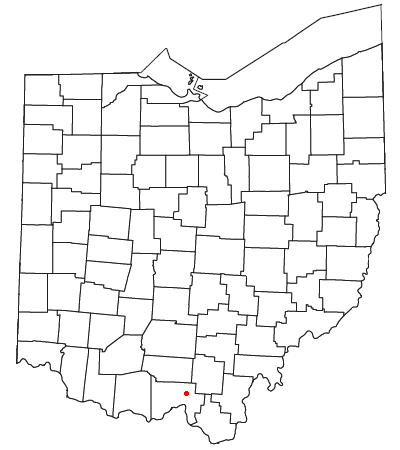
- Location of Minford, Ohio
- Coordinates: 38°52′05″N 82°51′38″W
- Country: United States
- State: Ohio
- County: Scioto

Government
  - Type: Part of a civil township

Area
  - Total: 1.75 sq mi (4.53 km^{2})
  - Land: 1.75 sq mi (4.52 km^{2})
  - Water: 0.0039 sq mi (0.01 km^{2})
- Elevation: 686 ft (209 m)

Population (2020)
  - Total: 641
  - Density: 367.6/sq mi (141.95/km^{2})
- Time zone: UTC-5 (Eastern (EST))
  - Summer (DST): UTC-4 (EDT)
- ZIP codes: 45653
- Area code: 740
- FIPS code: 39-50876
- GNIS feature ID: 2628934

Minford is a census-designated place located on the border of Harrison and Madison townships in northeastern Scioto County, Ohio, United States, about 14 miles (23 km) northeast of the county seat of Portsmouth. As of the 2020 census, it had a population of 641.

== History ==
The community was originally formed as Harrisonville in 1859, but its name was changed to Minford in 1917 due to the construction of the C&O Railroad, as there was another town along the railroad already named Harrisonville. The present name is in honor of the local Minford family.

== Geography ==
=== Physical geography ===
Minford is situated in rolling hills of the Appalachian Plateau and the Unglaciated Allegheny Plateau. These Appalachian foothills of southeastern Ohio, especially in nearby Shawnee State Park and Forest, have been nicknamed the "Little Smokies".

=== Rivers ===
The Little Scioto River runs adjacent (east) of Minford and continues southward through the Minford area toward Sciotoville where it flows into the Ohio River.

=== Climate ===
The area consists of deciduous forests and is within the ecoregion of Appalachian mixed mesophytic forests.

Being located in extreme southern Ohio, approximately 7 miles (11 km) from the Ohio River and Ohio-Kentucky border, the climate of Minford lies in the transitional/borderline region of two climate zones, the humid continental climate and the humid subtropical climate. However, the climate is closer to the humid continental climate.

Minford's weather is characterized by warm humid summers, cold wet winters, with brisk temperate spring and fall seasons. Rainfall amounts peak in late spring through summer (May to August).

=== Coordinates and distance to cities ===
Minford is located at 38°51′32″N 82°51′44″W, which is approximately 14 miles (23 km) northeast of Portsmouth, 45 miles (72 km) northwest of Huntington, West Virginia, and about 90 miles (140 km) south of Columbus.

=== Location and referencing ===
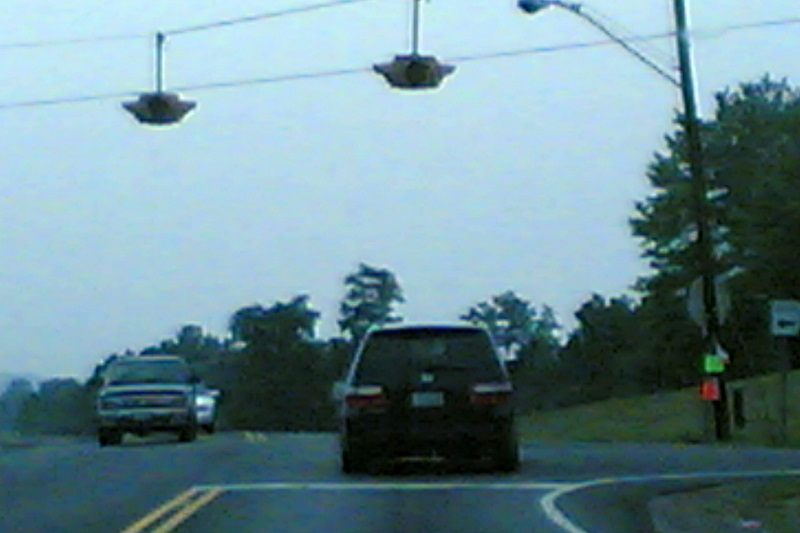
A view of the SR 139 & SR 335 intersection while traveling north on SR 335 in Minford

The center of Minford is located at the junction of State Route 335 and State Route 139. However, the Minford Local School District covers most of Madison and Harrison townships, including places of different ZIP codes.

=== Zip codes ===
Minford's post office has the ZIP code of 45653. Other ZIP codes in Harrison and Madison Townships include 45648 (Lucasville), 45662 (Portsmouth), and 45694 (Wheelersburg).

== Demographics ==
Historical population
Census	Pop.	Note	%±
2020	641		—
U.S. Decennial Census

== Transportation ==
=== State Route 139 ===
Minford's postal and office business district lies on South SR 139. New Boston is just 10 miles (16 km) south, and Jackson is just a little over 21 miles (34 km) north. SR 335 intersects with the route.

=== State Route 335 ===
Minford's business and school district lies on South SR 335. Sciotoville is 7 miles (11 km) south, and SR 32 is just a little over 14 miles (23 km) north. SR 139 intersects with the route, as do Lucasville-Minford Road and Bennett Road.

=== Lucasville-Minford Road ===
Lucasville-Minford Road is Minford's major truck and countryside route. It carries truckers and commuters from US 23 in Lucasville to SR 335 in Mule Town towards Minford to US 52 in Sciotoville. It becomes SR 728 in Valley Township near the Southern Ohio Correctional Facility to the road's terminus at US 23.

=== High Street ===
High Street is a subsidiary route that carries truckers and commuters from SR 335 to Lucasville-Minford Road in Mule Town. The route is just over 1 mile (1.6 km) long. SR 139 intersects with the route.

== Postal, telephone, cable and internet services ==
=== Post office ===
Minford is the home of Scioto County's fifth post office. However, the original building is no longer standing; a new post office was recently constructed at that location in 2000. The post office sits on the corner of SR 139 and West Street, with High Street on the east side.

=== Telephone, cable and internet services ===
Minford has its own telephone company for residences in Minford and Stockdale, that offers Dial-Up internet access to all of Scioto County and DSL to Minford and Stockdale subscribers only. Currently, the phone company is offering cable television services and fiber optic internet. The phone company sits on the corner of SR 139 and High Street.

== Notable persons ==
Minford natives include PGA Tour golfer Bob Sowards

== Schools ==
Numerous schoolhouses were in the area through its history, including the old Sunshine School as well as the Harrisonville School in 1878.

Today, the Minford area is served by the Minford Local School District.

The first "Minford" school opened in 1923, located on West Street. This building was later used as the Minford Middle School until its demolition in 2005 after the construction of the new buildings for Minford Local School District. The new schools were built between the years of 1998-2004. Minford High School was completed in 2001 and the elementary/middle school was completed in 2004.

== Local fire department and EMS ==
The Minford Volunteer Fire Department and Minford EMS Squad are located on State Route 335. The fire department was founded in 1944.

== Portsmouth bypass freeway ==
A Portsmouth bypass, State Route 823, was built around Portsmouth. The bypass is a four-lane limited-access divided highway that passes adjacent to Minford. The 16-mile-long (26 km) freeway bypasses the cities of Portsmouth and New Boston by connecting U.S. Route 23 north of Lucasville to U.S. Route 52 east of New Boston and west of Wheelersburg. There are two interchanges in Minford: one near the Greater Portsmouth Regional Airport on State Route 335, and one on Lucasville-Minford Road near Rases Mountain Drive.
