= Ohio State Route 776 =

State highway in southern Ohio, US

State Route 776

Route information
- Maintained by ODOT
- Length: 16.27 mi (26.18 km)
- Existed: 1938–present

Major junctions
- West end: SR 335 near Minford
- East end: SR 139 in Jackson

Location
- Country: United States
- State: Ohio
- Counties: Scioto, Pike, Jackson

Highway system
- Ohio State Highway System; Interstate; US; State; Scenic
← SR 775	→ SR 778

State Route 776 (SR 776) is an east–west state highway located in southern Ohio. The western terminus of SR 776 is at a T-intersection with SR 335 about 6 miles (9.7 km) north of Minford. Its eastern terminus is at another T-intersection with SR 139 in Jackson.

This route was formed in the late 1930s. From its western terminus in Scioto County, SR 776 heads east in the former Teays River valley. It heads due north into Pike County briefly and then back due east into Jackson County, where it passes through forest patches. It crosses the SR 32/SR 124 divided highway (the James A. Rhodes Appalachian Highway) 5 miles (8.0 km) southwest of Jackson, before ending at SR 139 less than 1 mile (1.6 km) west of downtown Jackson.

== Route description ==
This state highway passes through portions of Scioto, Pike and Jackson Counties. No part of SR 776 is included within the National Highway System.

== History ==
SR 776 was designated in 1938 along the routing that it currently occupies between SR 335 and SR 139. There have been no changes of major significance that have taken place to this route since it was established.

== Major intersections ==
County	Location	mi	km	Destinations	Notes
Scioto	Madison Township	0.00	0.00	SR 335 (Dewey Road)	
Pike	No major junctions				
Jackson	Scioto Township	11.51	18.52	SR 32 / SR 124 (James A. Rhodes Appalachian Highway) – Athens, Cincinnati	
Jackson	Jackson	16.27	26.18	SR 139 (Vaughn Street / East South Street)	
1.000 mi = 1.609 km; 1.000 km = 0.621 mi
