= Sciotoville, Ohio =

Sciotoville
- Neighborhood
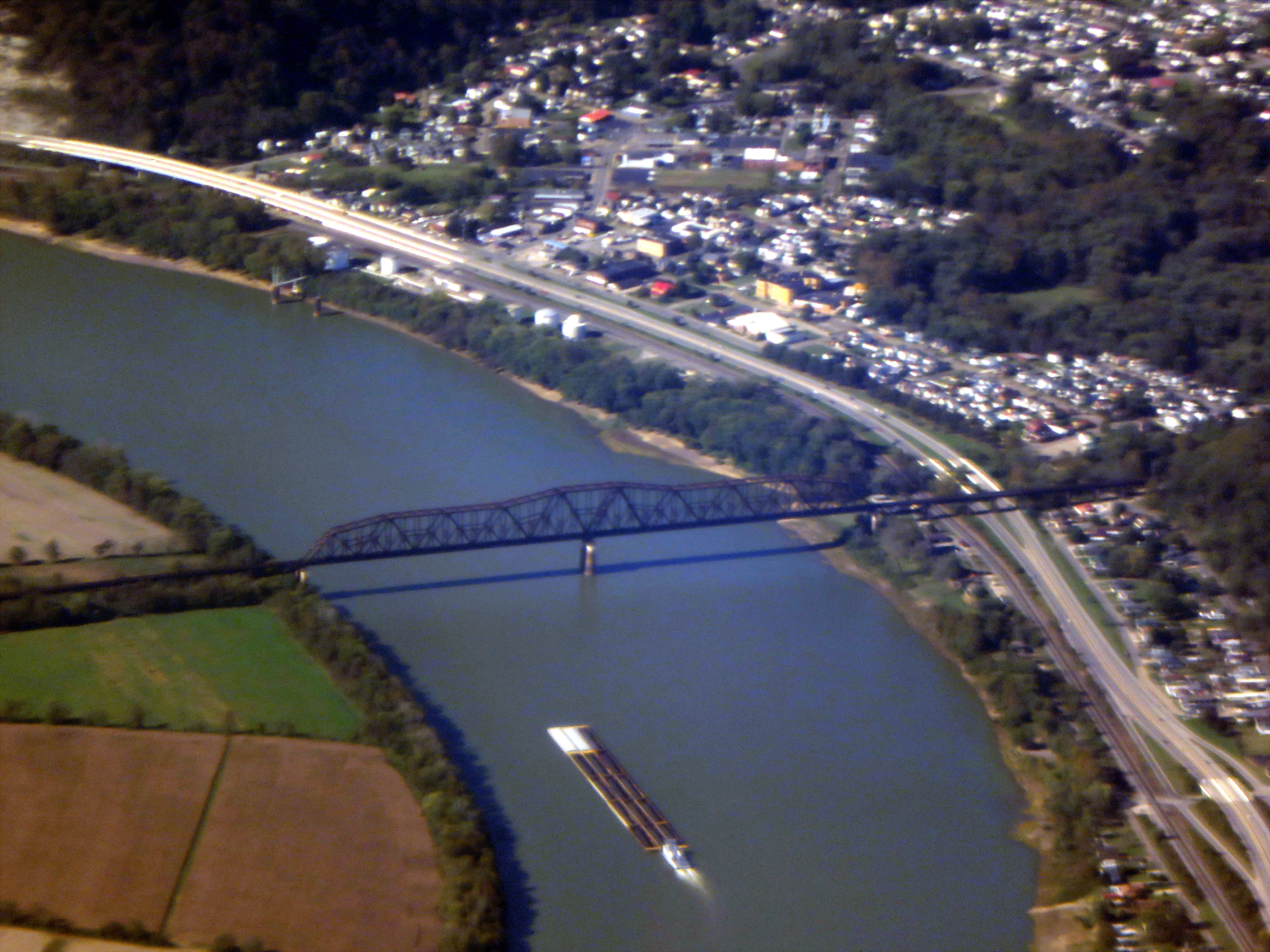
- Aerial view of Sciotoville

- Location within the state of Ohio
- Coordinates: 38°44′59″N 82°51′51″W
- Country: United States
- State: Ohio
- County: Scioto
- Time zone: UTC-5 (Eastern (EST))
  - Summer (DST): UTC-4 (EDT)
- ZIP codes: 45662
- GNIS feature ID: 1065293

Sciotoville is a neighborhood in the city of Portsmouth in Scioto County, Ohio. It is located at the intersection of U.S. 52 and State Route 335 between the village of New Boston and Wheelersburg in Scioto County along the northern bank of the Ohio River. It has its own post office, but shares the ZIP code of 45662 with the city of Portsmouth.

== History ==
The neighborhood was named after the Little Scioto River. Sciotoville was founded, with 25 lots, in 1835 and platted in 1841 by William Brown. In 1841, Madison Price platted 23 more lots. In 1851, John Shoemaker platted 34 more lots, bringing the total to 82 lots. The Wilcox Addition was platted on April 10, 1868, with 26 more lots. That same year, on December 19, Wm. Corwine platted 5 more lots. Samuel McConnell and H. A. Towne platted 35 lots in 1870. William Corwine platted 23 more lots on January 28, 1871. In 1889, on June 13, the people listed below platted another addition with 12 more lots:

- C. W. Turner and his wife
- John S. Mann and his wife
- Ira S. Farney and his wife
- W. L. Hitchcock and his wife
- Thomas Brock and his wife
- Andrew Daum and his wife
- Adam Ault and his wife
- Melvin Moore and his wife

That brought the total to 183 lots, which covered 34.44 acres of land. A post office called Sciotoville was established in 1848, and remained in operation until 1920. It was annexed by the city of Portsmouth in October 1920.

In 1877, an effort was made to make Sciotoville an incorporated village, but it failed due to some opposition.

=== Historical Services ===
The first hotel in Sciotoville was erected in 1843 and the first post office was established in 1844.

=== Industry ===
In early 1847, Messrs. Taylor, Decker & Co. started to make iron, but it got burned down the same year. Reece Thomas started to experiment with fire clay in 1863. Shortly after, two brothers, named Thomas and Taylor, opened clay mines in Sciotoville. They moved their brick plant to Sciotoville in 1864. In 1866, they named the company Taylor, Connell & Company

== Public services ==
The residents of Sciotoville are served educationally by the Portsmouth City School District, the Sciotoville Community School, and the Sciotoville Elementary Academy. Their library needs are provided by the Portsmouth Public Library (located in downtown Portsmouth), with branches in nearby New Boston, South Webster, and Wheelersburg. Sciotoville is also served by the Portsmouth Fire Department. A station is located on Harding Avenue.
