= Ron Giles (television executive) =

American television executive

- Born: Ronald D. Giles; 1942 (age 83–84); New Boston, Ohio, U.S.
- Education: Ohio University (BS); Ohio State University
- Occupations: Television executive; author

Ronald D. Giles (born 1942) is an American television executive and author.

== Background ==
Ron Giles graduated from Glenwood High School in New Boston in 1960. Earning degrees at Ohio University (BS, History Education) and the Ohio State University (Masters, Television and Film), Giles began his career teaching American History in Columbus, Ohio. After three years, he changed direction and joined the television broadcasting field.

== Television career ==
In 1967, Giles became a television studio director and producer at WBNS-TV channel 10 in Columbus. He then moved in 1974 to WCPO-TV channel 9 in Cincinnati, where he was executive producer of the station, producer and director of IN PERSON, and produced programs on quarter horses, amateur boxing, and specials such as a 25th anniversary of The Uncle Al Show, which at the time was the longest-running children's television program in the United States. Giles won a regional 1976 Emmy Award and the Golden Iris Award from the National Association of Television Program Executives for his "Music for the Seasons" Christmas special. He directed a three-camera television interview with President Gerald Ford, conducted at the White House by news director Al Schottelkotte.

In 1977, Giles returned to Columbus to help launch the QUBE interactive cable television service for Warner Cable, where as one of the program executives he hosted a daily talk show (Columbus Alive) and worked as a producer. Between 1979 and 1980, Giles was executive producer of programming at WBZ-TV in Boston. When QUBE expanded to Pittsburgh, Giles returned to head broadcasting and supervised community access production and the design and construction of six television studios. Giles joined John B. Mullin and Diamond P Sports in 1984, to work on their productions for the National Hot Rod Association and The Nashville Network. Among these productions was One Lap of America, created by Brock Yates, a one-hour special of the event airing on NBC.

Giles was then a part of the 1986 start-up team at QVC, a cable television shopping channel envisioned by entrepreneur and founder of The Franklin Mint, Joseph Segel. Giles got the fledgling television operation on the air in less than three months, and by the early 1990s, Giles would rise to executive vice president at QVC.

With the advent of Barry Diller as the new chairman of QVC, Giles would become the Executive Vice President of QVC International with responsibilities for the expansion of the QVC television shopping concept into the United Kingdom, Mexico, and Germany. Subsequently, he worked as a televised-shopping consultant in Australia, Brazil, and South Korea.

== Author ==
Giles has published several books of fiction and a memoir.

- On Harrisonville Avenue, 2008 - memoir
- Cottonwood Pass, 2009 - suspense
- Great Heats, 2011 - historical fiction
- Locusts and Wild Honey, 2013 - supernatural
- The Porter Curse, 2020, supernatural, occult
