= Little Scioto River =

Little Scioto River may refer to any of several streams in the state of Ohio in the United States:

- Little Scioto River, a tributary of the Ohio River.
- Little Scioto River, a tributary of the Scioto River.
- Ohio Brush Creek was known historically as the Little Scioto River.

== See also ==
- Scioto River
