= Ohio State Route 335 =

State highway in southern Ohio, US

State Route 335

Route information
- Maintained by ODOT
- Length: 42.41 mi (68.25 km)
- Existed: 1933–present

Major junctions
- South end: US 52 in Portsmouth
- North end: US 23 / SR 104 / SR 220 in Waverly

Location
- Country: United States
- State: Ohio
- Counties: Scioto, Pike

Highway system
- Ohio State Highway System; Interstate; US; State; Scenic
| ← SR 334 | → SR 336 |

State Route 335 (SR 335) is a north–south state highway in the southern portion of the U.S. state of Ohio.

== Route description ==
Its southern terminus is at US 52 in Sciotoville, a neighborhood within the city of Portsmouth. Heading north it winds its way through Sciotoville then intersects with Swauger Valley Rd and Slocum Ave to run very close to the Little Scioto River. It then intersects with SR 823 and turns north at Shepherd Ave. Soon after passing a small neighborhood it joins up with Dixon Mill Rd and runs north until Little Scioto River forces it into a westward curve. It continues a north-west trajectory, intersecting with SR 139 in Minford. It then continues north, and after crossing the rivers Sweet Run and Rocky Fork it takes another slight north-west turn before straightening north for a considerable time. Next it crosses SR 776, near Stockdale, and winds itself across McDowell Creek. It crosses SR 32 and SR 124 near Beaver and then crosses Beaver Pike in Beaver. It continues loosely north until Jackson Lake, where it takes a sharp westward turn. It follows a north-west path until crossing the Carrs Run river and turning north again. After passing the 335 Pit Stop it runs straight west before turning north at River Rd and crossing the Scioto River. At Higby Rd it starts travelling south-west until its northern terminus at SR 220 in Waverly where it has a wrong-way concurrency with US 23 and SR 104 for 0.35 miles (0.56 km).

== History ==
SR 335 was commissioned in 1932, on it current route between Minford and Beaver. The highway was extended to Waverly in 1937. In 1939, the route was extended south to Portsmouth.

In 2003, the Ohio Department of Transportation (ODOT) commenced construction on a $1.8 million project to realign SR 335 from Dixon Mill Road to Gampp Lane in Scioto County east of the CSX railroad line. The realignment project was completed in May 2005.

== Major intersections ==
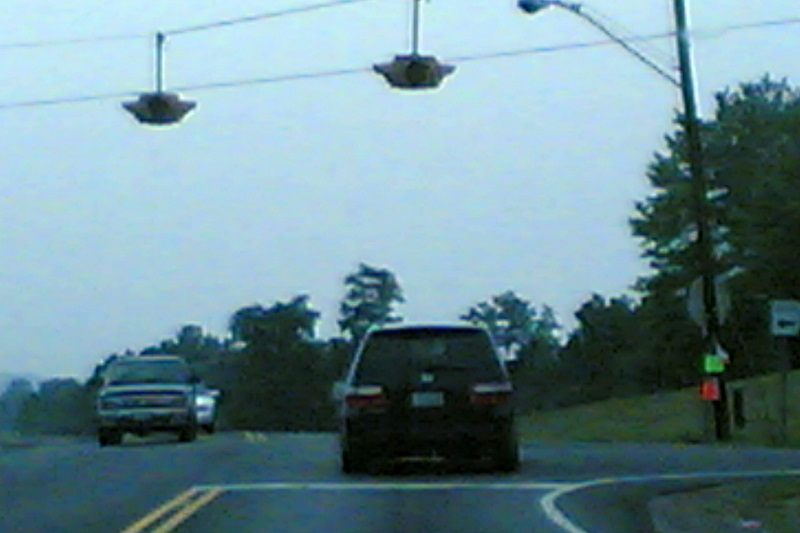
A view of the SR 335 & SR 139 intersection while traveling north on SR 335 in Minford

| County | Location | mi | km | Destinations | Notes |
|---|---|---|---|---|---|
| Scioto | Portsmouth | 0.00– 0.42 | 0.00– 0.68 | US 52 west / Gallia Street | No eastbound entrance to US 52 |
| Scioto | Minford | 9.28 | 14.93 | SR 139 | |
| Scioto | Madison Township | 15.39 | 24.77 | SR 776 east | Western terminus of SR 776 |
| Pike | Marion Township | 21.25 | 34.20 | SR 32 / SR 124 (James A. Rhodes Appalachian Highway) – Jackson, Cincinnati | |
| Pike | Waverly | 42.06 | 67.69 | US 23 north / SR 104 north (East Emmit Avenue) / Clough Street | Northern end of US 23 and SR 104 concurrency |
| Pike | Waverly | 42.41 | 68.25 | US 23 south / SR 104 south (West Emmit Avenue) / SR 220 (Market Street) | Southern end of US 23 and SR 104 concurrency |
1.000 mi = 1.609 km; 1.000 km = 0.621 mi: Concurrency terminus; Incomplete access
