= South Webster, Ohio =

Village in Ohio, United States

- Village
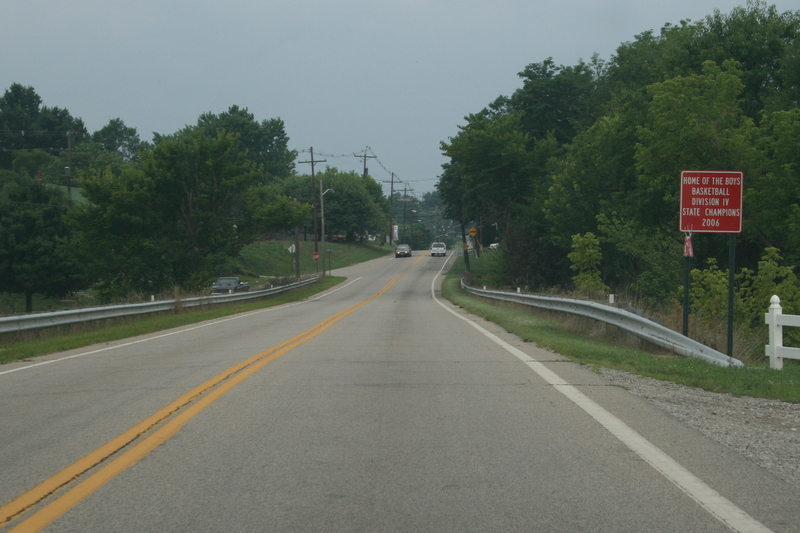
- Entering from the northeast on State Route 140

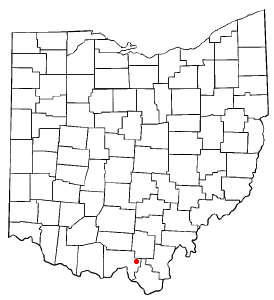
- Location of South Webster, Ohio

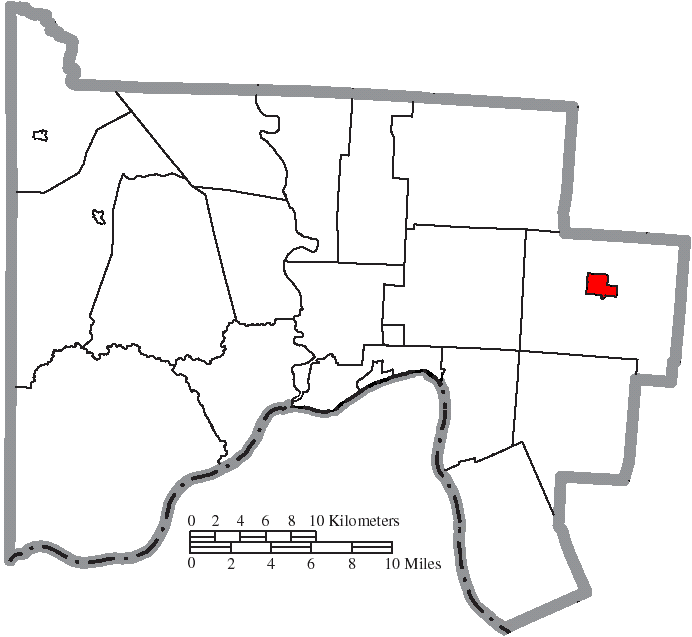
- Location of South Webster in Scioto County
- Coordinates: 38°49′01″N 82°43′42″W
- Country: United States
- State: Ohio
- County: Scioto

Area
  - Total: 1.32 sq mi (3.43 km^{2})
  - Land: 1.31 sq mi (3.40 km^{2})
  - Water: 0.012 sq mi (0.03 km^{2})
- Elevation: 728 ft (222 m)

Population (2020)
  - Total: 670
  - Estimate (2024): 651
  - Density: 510.5/sq mi (197.12/km^{2})
- Time zone: UTC-5 (Eastern (EST))
  - Summer (DST): UTC-4 (EDT)
- ZIP code: 45682
- Area code: 740
- FIPS code: 39-73824
- GNIS feature ID: 2399861
- Website: https://southwebsterohio.gov/

South Webster is a village in northeast Scioto County, Ohio, United States. It lies along State Route 140. The population was 670 at the 2020 census.

== History ==
South Webster was platted by John Bennett in 1853. The village was named after Daniel Webster.

== Geography ==
According to the United States Census Bureau, the village has a total area of 1.32 square miles (3.42 km^{2}), of which 1.31 square miles (3.39 km^{2}) is land and 0.01 square miles (0.03 km^{2}) is water.

== Demographics ==
Historical population
Census	Pop.	Note	%±
1870	200		—
1890	323		—
1900	445		37.8%
1910	499		12.1%
1920	604		21.0%
1930	697		15.4%
1940	656		−5.9%
1950	663		1.1%
1960	803		21.1%
1970	825		2.7%
1980	886		7.4%
1990	806		−9.0%
2000	764		−5.2%
2010	866		13.4%
2020	670		−22.6%
U.S. Decennial Census

=== 2010 census ===
As of the census of 2010, there were 866 people, 370 households, and 265 families living in the village. The population density was 661.1 inhabitants per square mile (255.3/km^{2}). There were 395 housing units at an average density of 301.5 per square mile (116.4/km^{2}). The racial makeup of the village was 98.2% White, 0.1% African American, 0.1% Native American, 0.3% Asian, and 1.3% from two or more races. Hispanic or Latino of any race were 0.3% of the population.

There were 370 households, of which 31.6% had children under the age of 18 living with them, 54.6% were married couples living together, 11.6% had a female householder with no husband present, 5.4% had a male householder with no wife present, and 28.4% were non-families. 25.4% of all households were made up of individuals, and 13.7% had someone living alone who was 65 years of age or older. The average household size was 2.34 and the average family size was 2.76.

The median age in the village was 43.9 years. 22.7% of residents were under the age of 18; 4.1% were between the ages of 18 and 24; 24.3% were from 25 to 44; 29.2% were from 45 to 64; and 19.7% were 65 years of age or older. The gender makeup of the village was 47.7% male and 52.3% female.

=== 2000 census ===
As of the census of 2000, there were 764 people, 312 households, and 224 families living in the village. The population density was 584.8 inhabitants per square mile (225.8/km^{2}). There were 338 housing units at an average density of 258.7 per square mile (99.9/km^{2}). The racial makeup of the village was 98.30% White, 0.65% Native American, 0.39% Pacific Islander, 0.13% from other races, and 0.52% from two or more races. Hispanic or Latino of any race were 0.65% of the population.

There were 312 households, out of which 31.1% had children under the age of 18 living with them, 56.4% were married couples living together, 11.9% had a female householder with no husband present, and 27.9% were non-families. 26.0% of all households were made up of individuals, and 15.1% had someone living alone who was 65 years of age or older. The average household size was 2.45 and the average family size was 2.91.

In the village, the population was spread out, with 24.6% under the age of 18, 10.1% from 18 to 24, 26.2% from 25 to 44, 24.7% from 45 to 64, and 14.4% who were 65 years of age or older. The median age was 38 years. For every 100 females there were 87.7 males. For every 100 females age 18 and over, there were 81.1 males.

The median income for a household in the village was $26,818, and the median income for a family was $40,938. Males had a median income of $31,583 versus $22,727 for females. The per capita income for the village was $15,047. About 13.0% of families and 16.4% of the population were below the poverty line, including 21.7% of those under age 18 and 14.1% of those age 65 or over.

== Public services ==
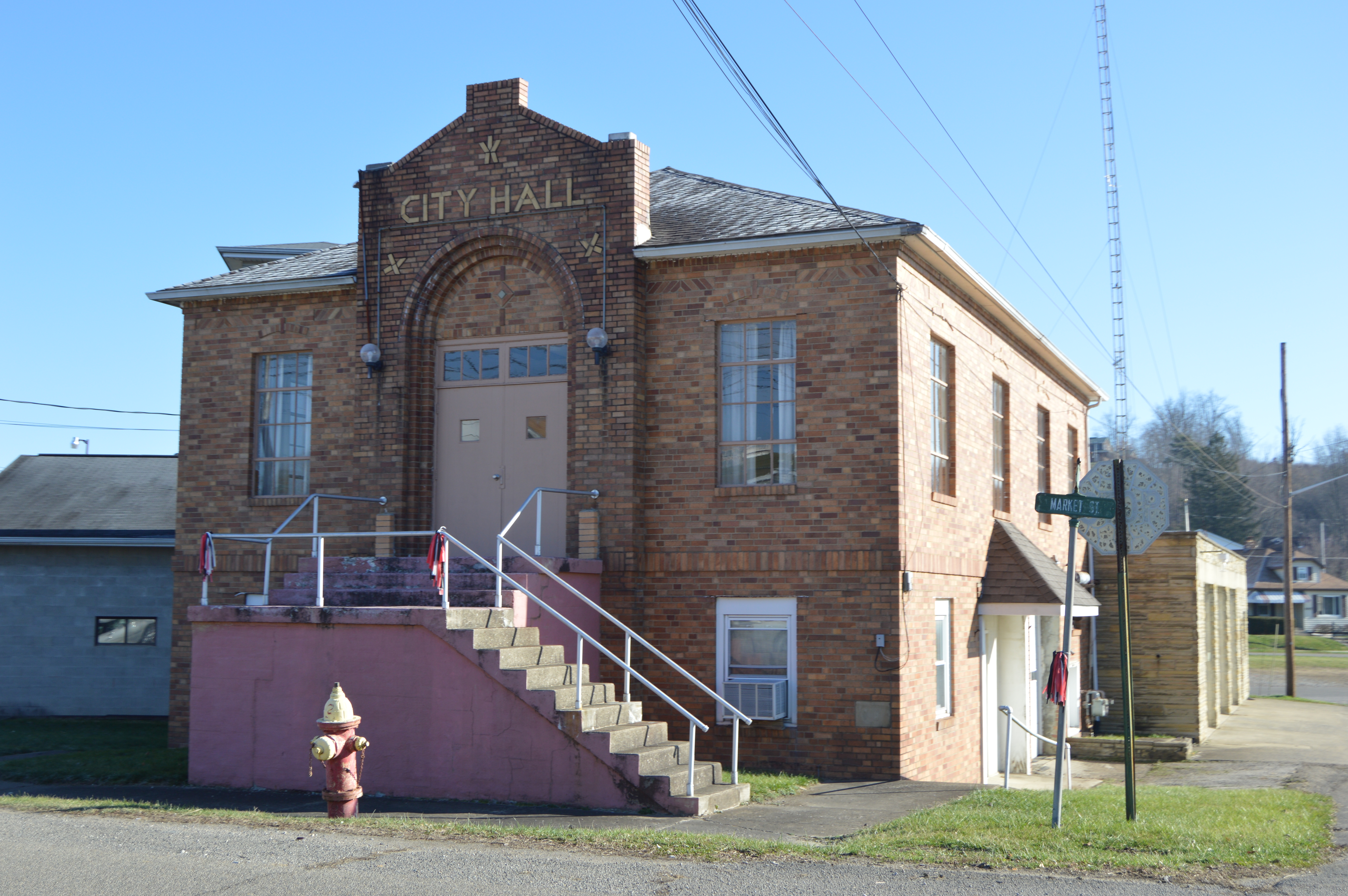
South Webster Municipal Building

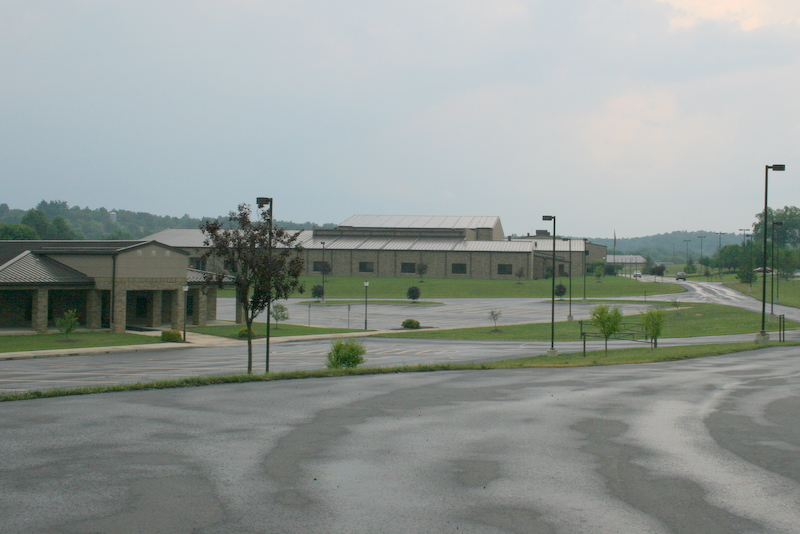
The Bloom-Vernon Local Schools (South Webster Elementary (foreground) and South Webster Jr.-Sr. High School)

South Webster is home to the Bloom-Vernon Local School District. The district includes Bloom-Vernon Elementary School and South Webster Jr.-Sr. High School. South Webster's mascot is the Jeep. They won the 2006 Ohio High School Athletic Association Division IV basketball State Championship and were in the final four in 2004 and 2025. The village is home to the 2014 Minford Basketball Tournament 4th Grade Girls Champions. The Jeeps high school volleyball team also made an appearance at the state tournament in 2021.

South Webster is served by the Portsmouth Public Library-South Webster Branch.

== Notable locals ==
- Brett Roberts, basketball and baseball player
- Chet Spencer, baseball player
