= Portsmouth Public Library (Ohio) =

Coordinates: 38.7347°N 82.9887°W

Scioto County Public Library
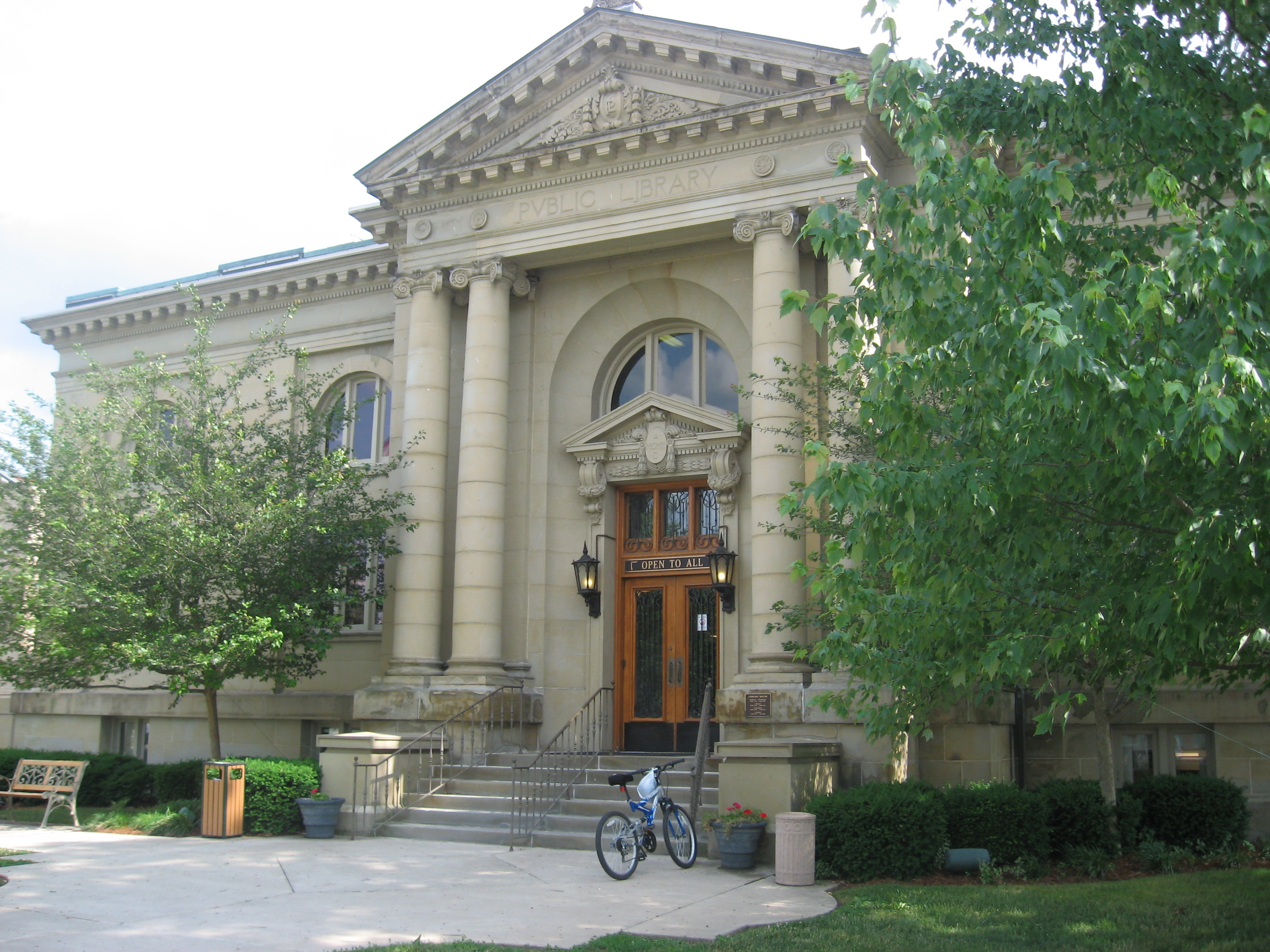
- Location: Portsmouth, Ohio
- Established: 1879
- Branches: 4

Access and use
- Circulation: 370,000
- Population served: 80,000+

Other information
- Website: www.yourppl.org; www.sciotolibrary.org

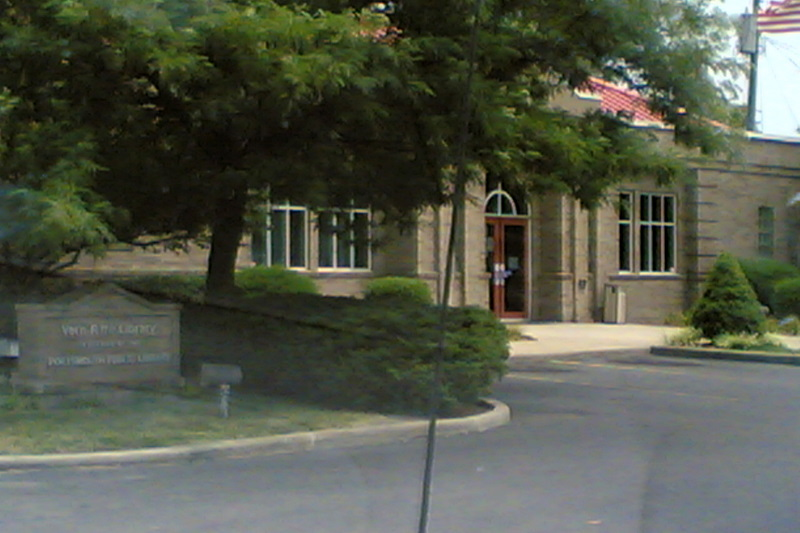
New Boston (Vern Riffe) Branch

The Portsmouth Public Library is a public library located near downtown Portsmouth, Ohio, United States. It has served the city since 1879. The library also has four branch locations in Scioto County: Lucasville, New Boston, South Webster, and Wheelersburg.

In January 2023, the Portsmouth Public Library name changed to the Scioto County Public Library, as the main branch for the public libraries in Scioto County.

The main library is located on Gallia Street across from the new Portsmouth High School complex. The W. Gordan Ryan (Lucasville) Branch (established in 1990) is located near the Scioto County Fairgrounds on Lucasville-Minford Road. The Vern Riffe (New Boston) Branch (1941) is located on eastbound U.S. 52 (Rhodes Avenue). The South Webster Branch (1984) is behind the South Webster High School complex while the Wheelersburg Branch (1965) is located on Old Gallia Pike between Pirate Drive (Wheelersburg High School) and State Route 522.

== Brief history ==
Portsmouth's traces of a public library began in 1831 when a small library opened at the corner of Market and Front Streets. However, the library closed a short time later. It wasn't until 1879 when the Portsmouth City Schools Board of Education donated a building at the corner of Fifth and Court to provide these services. The first librarian of this location was Colonel James Wharton. He grew the library's collection to 5,000 volumes by September 1881. The biggest donation came in 1902 when Andrew Carnegie donated $50,000 to construct a new library with the solicitation of Henry A. Lorberg. The new library opened on February 1, 1906, on Gallia Street and is still used to this day. The original architectural firm was Richards, McCarty and Bulford. Much of the architecture stays true to the numerous Carnegie libraries even though the library received renovations and extensions in 1971 and 1995 by the architectural firm of Donaldson, Wittenmeyer and Associates and Myers, NBD. Today the library offers microfilm of the Portsmouth Daily Times and other forgotten papers of the city, a local history department, and local Bookmobile services which began in 1938. The library celebrated its 100th anniversary in 2006 with a reenactment of the opening with current workers in early-1900s attire. It has an annual circulation of over 370,000.
