= Clay Township, Scioto County, Ohio =

Township in Ohio, US

- Township
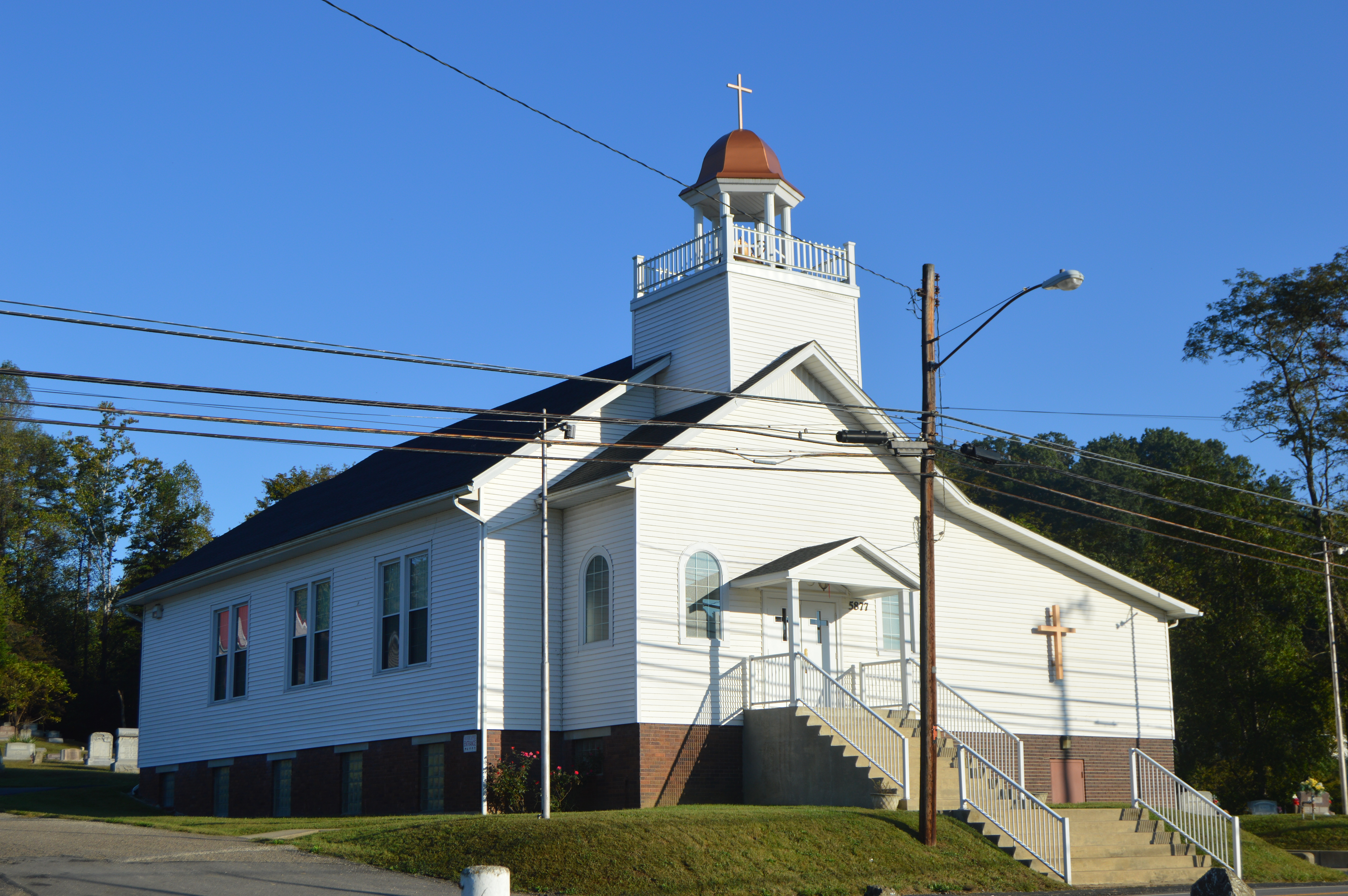
- Christ's Brethren Church at Rubyville

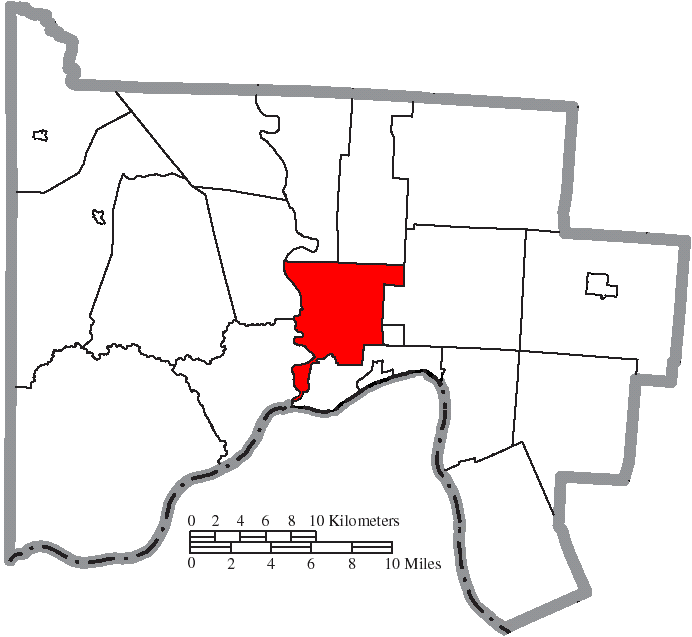
- Location of Clay Township in Scioto County
- Coordinates: 38°47′32″N 82°58′6″W
- Country: United States
- State: Ohio
- County: Scioto

Area
  - Total: 22.1 sq mi (57.3 km^{2})
  - Land: 21.7 sq mi (56.1 km^{2})
  - Water: 0.50 sq mi (1.3 km^{2})
- Elevation: 978 ft (298 m)

Population (2020)
  - Total: 3,516
  - Density: 162/sq mi (62.7/km^{2})
- Time zone: UTC-5 (Eastern (EST))
  - Summer (DST): UTC-4 (EDT)
- FIPS code: 39-15560
- GNIS feature ID: 1086924

Clay Township is one of the sixteen townships of Scioto County, Ohio, United States. The 2020 census counted 3,516 people in the township.

== Geography ==
Located in the center of the county, it borders the following townships:

- Valley Township - north, west of Jefferson Township
- Jefferson Township - north, east of Valley Township
- Harrison Township - east
- Porter Township - southeast
- Washington Township - southwest
- Rush Township - northwest

No municipalities are located in Clay Township, although the city of Portsmouth (the county seat of Scioto County) has incorporated much of the southern part of the township. The census-designated place of Rosemount lies in the center of the township, along with the unincorporated communities of Eden Park, Rubyville, and Twin Valley.

== Name and history ==
Clay Township was organized on June 7, 1826. The township was named after Henry Clay, the Kentucky statesman. It is one of nine Clay Townships statewide.

== Government ==
The township is governed by a three-member board of trustees, who are elected in November of odd-numbered years to a four-year term beginning on the following January 1. Two are elected in the year after the presidential election and one is elected in the year before it. There is also an elected township fiscal officer, who serves a four-year term beginning on April 1 of the year after the election, which is held in November of the year before the presidential election. Vacancies in the fiscal officership or on the board of trustees are filled by the remaining trustees.

== Public services ==
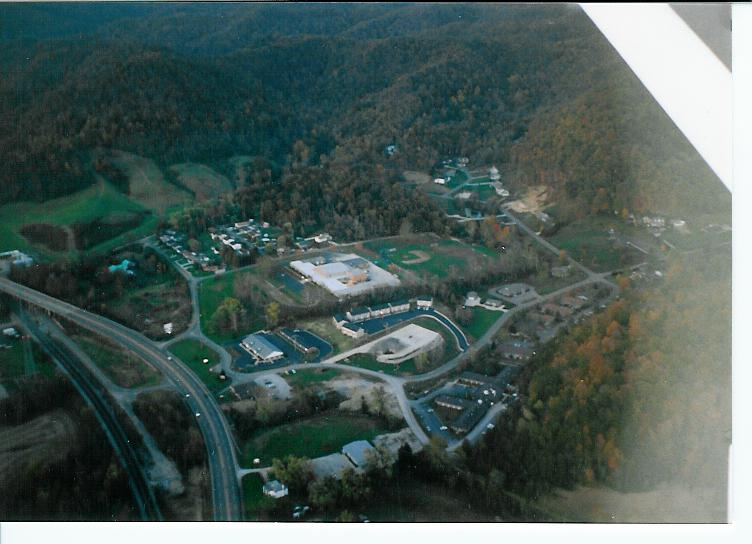
Aerial view of Clay High School and surrounding area near Feurt Hill Estates, fall of 2003

Residents are served by the Clay Local School District, The district has a newly constructed building which contains grades PK-12. The district is bordered by State Route 139 on the east and by U.S. Route 23 and the Scioto River on the west. Volunteer fire departments are operated in the communities of Rosemount and Rubyville.
