= Scioto Furnace, Ohio =

Unincorporated community in Ohio, U.S.

Coordinates: 38°47′55″N 82°45′54″W

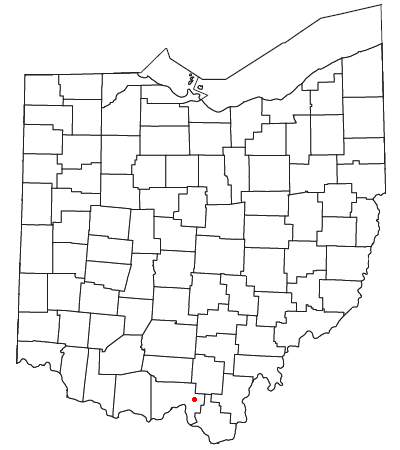
Location of Scioto Furnace, Ohio

Scioto Furnace is an unincorporated community in western Bloom Township, Scioto County, Ohio, United States. It has a post office with the ZIP code 45677. It lies along State Route 140.

== History ==
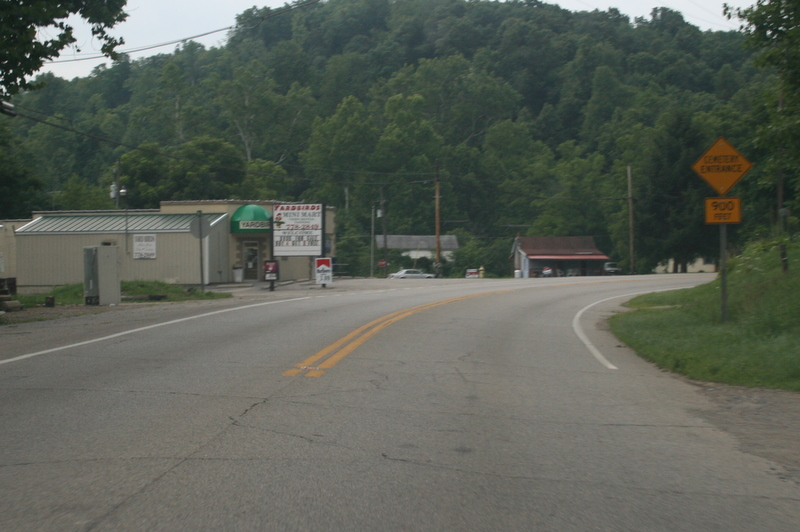
A view of Scioto Furnace (U.S. Post Office) while traveling south on SR 140

A post office called Scioto Furnace has been in operation since 1862. The community's namesake Scioto Furnace was a blast furnace which was in operation from 1828 until 1892.
