= Rosemount, Ohio =

- Census-designated place
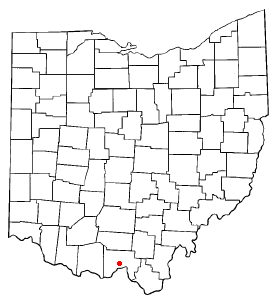
- Location of Rosemount, Ohio
- Coordinates: 38°46′52″N 82°57′59″W
- Country: United States
- State: Ohio
- County: Scioto

Area
  - Total: 5.75 sq mi (14.90 km^{2})
  - Land: 5.75 sq mi (14.89 km^{2})
  - Water: 0.0039 sq mi (0.01 km^{2})
- Elevation: 705 ft (215 m)

Population (2020)
  - Total: 2,117
  - Density: 368.3/sq mi (142.19/km^{2})
- Time zone: UTC-5 (Eastern (EST))
  - Summer (DST): UTC-4 (EDT)
- FIPS code: 39-68546
- GNIS feature ID: 2393215

Rosemount is a census-designated place (CDP) in Clay Township, Scioto County, Ohio, United States. The population was 2,117 at the 2020 census.

== Geography ==
According to the United States Census Bureau, the CDP has a total area of 5.8 square miles (15 km^{2}), all land.

== Demographics ==
Historical population
Census	Pop.	Note	%±
2020	2,117		—
U.S. Decennial Census

As of the census of 2000, there were 2,043 people, 844 households, and 602 families residing in the CDP. The population density was 355.0 inhabitants per square mile (137.1/km^{2}). There were 901 housing units at an average density of 156.6 per square mile (60.5/km^{2}). The racial makeup of the CDP was 98.34% White, 0.24% African American, 0.20% Native American, 0.05% Asian, 0.05% Pacific Islander, 0.05% from other races, and 1.08% from two or more races. Hispanic or Latino of any race were 0.20% of the population.

There were 844 households, out of which 28.9% had children under the age of 18 living with them, 60.9% were married couples living together, 7.8% had a female householder with no husband present, and 28.6% were non-families. 25.6% of all households were made up of individuals, and 13.7% had someone living alone who was 65 years of age or older. The average household size was 2.42 and the average family size was 2.89.

In the CDP, the population was spread out, with 22.6% under the age of 18, 6.6% from 18 to 24, 26.7% from 25 to 44, 25.7% from 45 to 64, and 18.4% who were 65 years of age or older. The median age was 41 years. For every 100 females, there were 87.3 males. For every 100 females age 18 and over, there were 83.1 males.

The median income for a household in the CDP was $40,625, and the median income for a family was $46,071. Males had a median income of $36,612 versus $23,603 for females. The per capita income for the CDP was $20,978. About 5.6% of families and 8.3% of the population were below the poverty line, including 11.2% of those under age 18 and 2.4% of those age 65 or over.

== Public services ==
Residents of Rosemount are served by the Clay Local School District, the Portsmouth Public Library, and a volunteer fire department.

== Notable person ==
- Dale Bandy, basketball coach for Ohio University

== Education ==
Clay Local School District

Clay High School
