= Lucasville, Ohio =

- Census-designated place
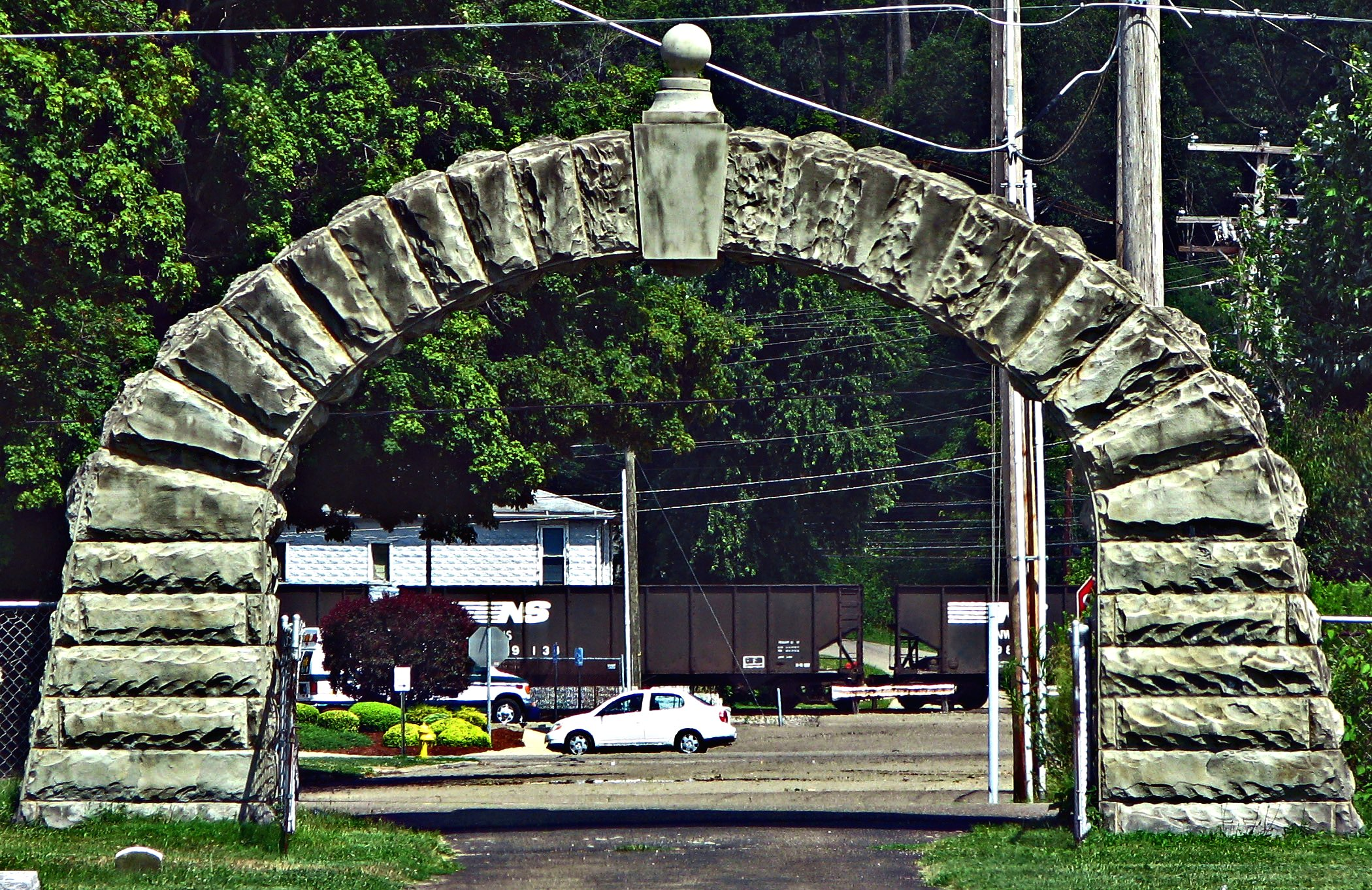
- Cemetery Arch
- Interactive map of Lucasville, Ohio
- Location within Ohio Location within the United States
- Coordinates: 38°52′40″N 82°59′40″W
- Country: United States
- State: Ohio
- County: Scioto

Area
  - Total: 3.51 sq mi (9.10 km^{2})
  - Land: 3.47 sq mi (9.00 km^{2})
  - Water: 0.039 sq mi (0.10 km^{2})
- Elevation: 535 ft (163 m)

Population (2020)
  - Total: 1,655
  - Density: 476.5/sq mi (183.96/km^{2})
- Time zone: UTC-5 (Eastern (EST))
  - Summer (DST): UTC-4 (EDT)
- ZIP codes: 45648, 45699
- Area code: 740
- FIPS code: 39-45304
- GNIS feature ID: 2393112

Lucasville is a census-designated place (CDP) in Scioto County, Ohio, United States. The population was 1,655 at the 2020 census. It is part of the Portsmouth micropolitan area.

Lucasville is the location of the Scioto County Fairgrounds. The Southern Ohio Correctional Facility, one of Ohio's three maximum security prisons and the location of Ohio's death house where death row inmates are executed, is located just outside Lucasville. The community is served by the Portsmouth Public Library, as well as the Valley Local School District and Northwest Local School District.

== History ==
Lucasville was laid out by Captain John Lucas (1788-1825) in 1819, and named for him. A post office called Lucasville has been in operation since 1828.

John Lucas was the brother of Robert Lucas, a War of 1812 hero, two-term governor of Ohio (1832-1836), and the first territorial governor of Iowa. John volunteered for service and commanded a regiment during the War of 1812. Upon the death of his father in 1814, John inherited much of his family's property in Scioto County, and it was on a portion of this land that he would establish the town of Lucasville on August 7, 1819. He and his wife, Mary Lucas, ran a tavern in Lucasville until his death in 1825. He is interred in Lucasville Cemetery.

== Geography ==
According to the United States Census Bureau, the CDP has a total area of 2.5 square miles (6.6 km^{2}), of which 2.5 square miles (6.5 km^{2}) is land and 0.04 square miles (0.1 km^{2}), or 1.57%, is water.

== Demographics ==
Historical population
| Census | Pop. | Note | %± |
|---|---|---|---|
| 2000 | 1,588 | | — |
| 2010 | 2,757 | | 73.6% |
| 2020 | 1,655 | | −40.0% |
U.S. Decennial Census

As of the census of 2000, there were 1,588 people, 589 households, and 448 families residing in the CDP. The population density was 631.4 inhabitants per square mile (243.8/km^{2}). There were 672 housing units at an average density of 267.2 per square mile (103.2/km^{2}). The racial makeup of the CDP was 97.10% White, 0.13% African American, 0.25% Native American, 0.25% Asian, 0.06% Pacific Islander, 0.06% from other races, and 2.14% from two or more races. Hispanic or Latino of any race were 0.31% of the population.

There were 589 households, out of which 33.8% had children under the age of 18 living with them, 57.2% were married couples living together, 14.1% had a female householder with no husband present, and 23.8% were non-families. 21.2% of all households were made up of individuals, and 10.4% had someone living alone who was 65 years of age or older. The average household size was 2.70 and the average family size was 3.08.

In the CDP, the population was spread out, with 26.8% under the age of 18, 9.8% from 18 to 24, 26.6% from 25 to 44, 25.3% from 45 to 64, and 11.5% who were 65 years of age or older. The median age was 37 years. For every 100 females, there were 90.6 males. For every 100 females age 18 and over, there were 87.4 males.

The median income for a household in the CDP was $25,313, and the median income for a family was $37,443. Males had a median income of $30,125 versus $21,174 for females. The per capita income for the CDP was $13,569. About 6.8% of families and 8.5% of the population were below the poverty line, including 6.4% of those under age 18 and none of those age 65 or over.

== Notable people ==
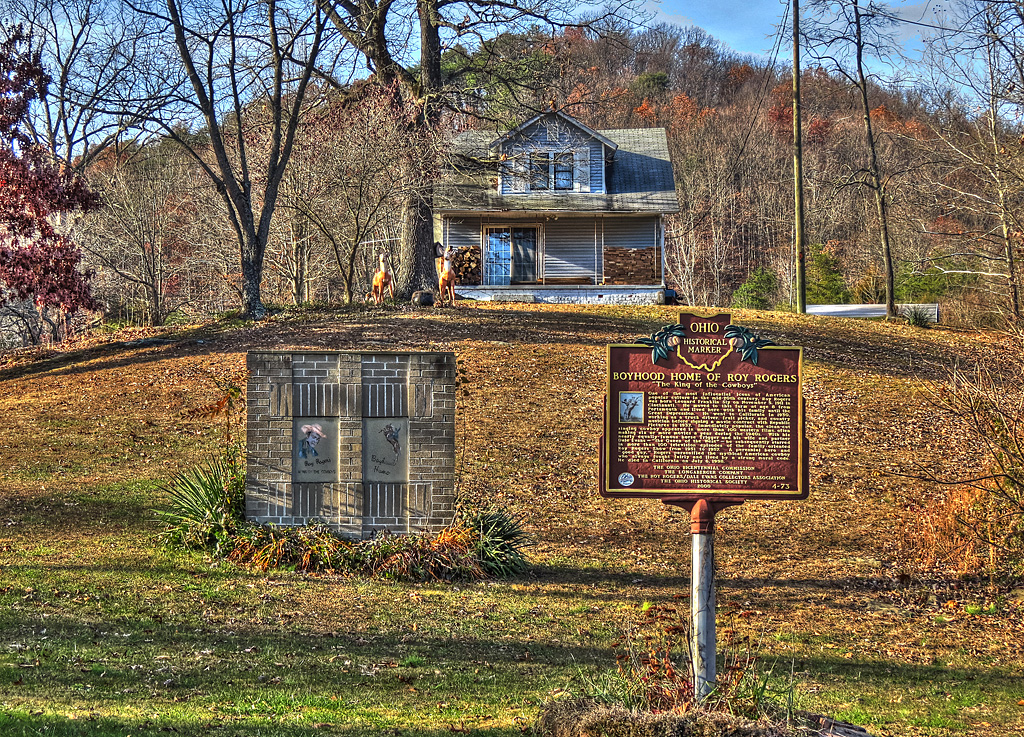
Roy Rogers' boyhood home at Duck Run, near Lucasville

- Branch Rickey, baseball executive
- Roy Rogers, singer and cowboy actor
- Barry Sparks, professional musician/bass guitarist
- Ted Strickland, former U.S. representative (1993–2006) and Ohio governor (2007–2011)
- Gene Tenace, former Major League Baseball player
