= Little Scioto River (Ohio River tributary) =

Coordinates: 38.7551°N 82.8846°W

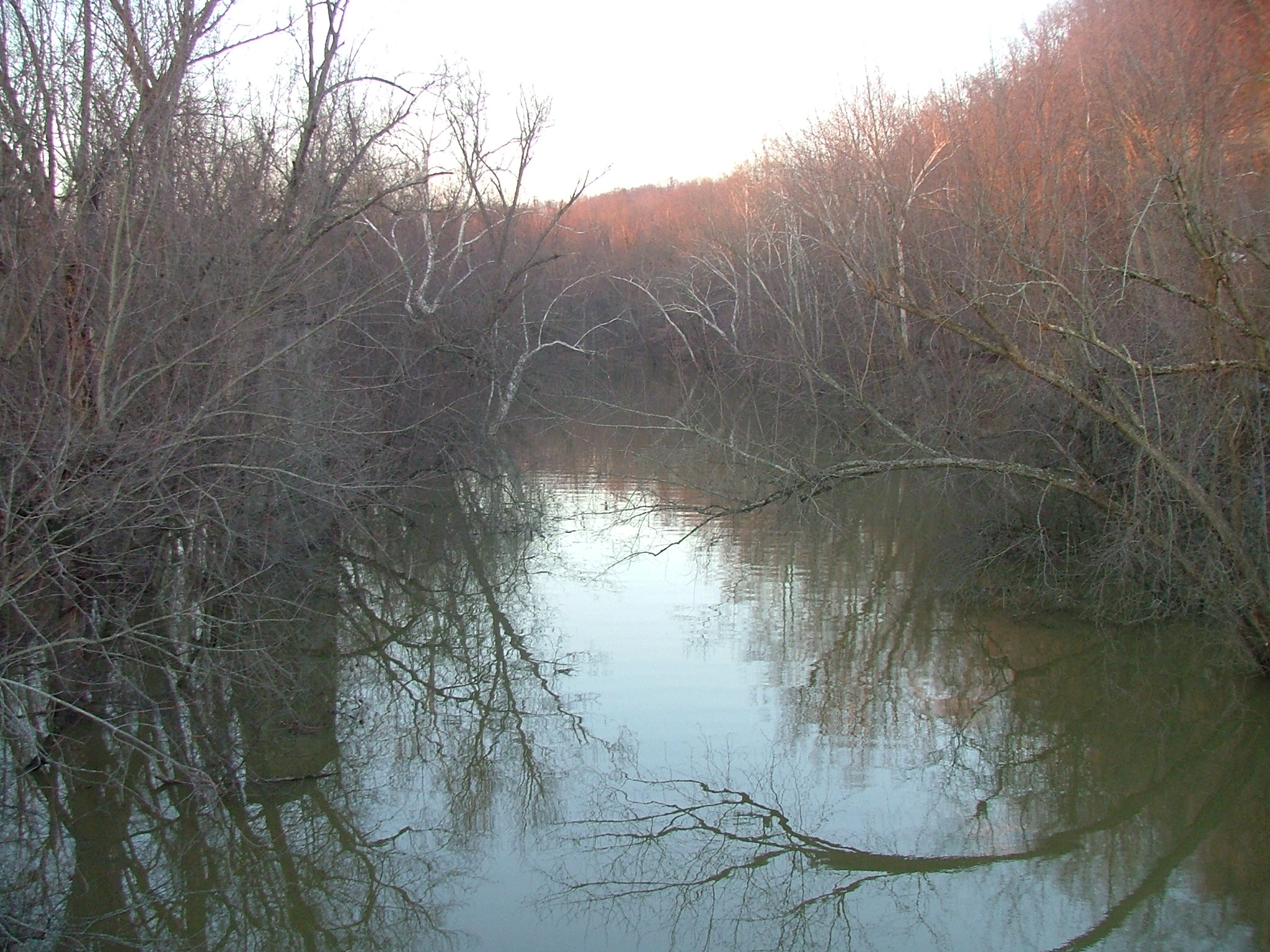
- Near its confluence with the Ohio River at Sciotoville

Physical characteristics
- Length: 43 mi (69 km)
- Basin size: 233 mi^{2} (600 km^{2})

The Little Scioto River is a tributary of the Ohio River, about 42.8 miles (68.9 km) long, in southern Ohio in the United States. Via the Ohio River, it is part of the watershed of the Mississippi River, draining an area of 233 square miles (600 km^{2}).

The Little Scioto River rises in western Jackson County and flows generally southwardly into Scioto County, near Minford. It flows into the Ohio River in the eastern part of the city of Portsmouth, 6 miles (9.7 km) east of the town's center.

The United States Board on Geographic Names settled on "Little Scioto River" as the stream's name in 1913. According to the Geographic Names Information System, the Little Scioto has also been known historically as "Brushy Fork," "Little Siota River" and "Little Sciota River."

== See also ==
- List of rivers of Ohio
- Scioto River
