= New Boston, Ohio =

- Village
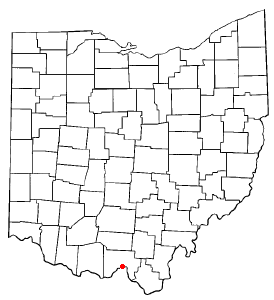
- Location of New Boston, Ohio

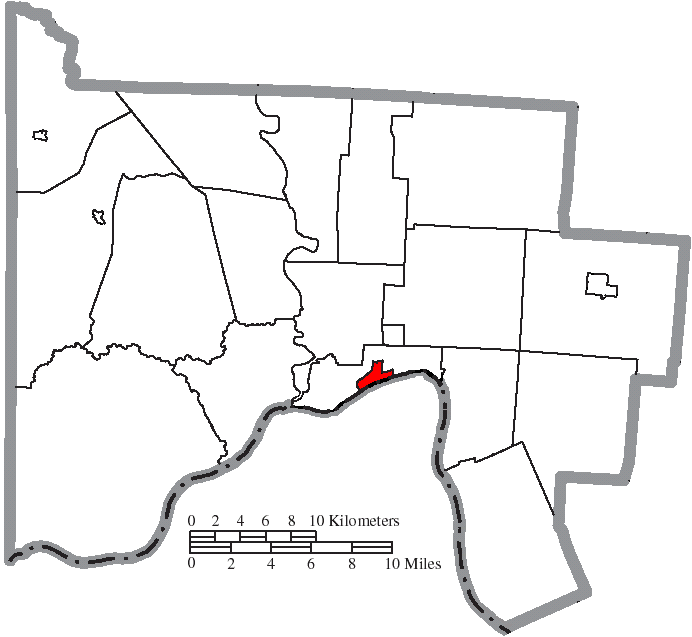
- Location of New Boston in Scioto County
- Coordinates: 38°44′50″N 82°56′16″W
- Country: United States
- State: Ohio
- County: Scioto
- Named for: Boston

Government
  - Mayor: William "Junior" Williams
  - Clerk of Courts: Jessica Grant

Area
  - Total: 1.16 sq mi (3.00 km^{2})
  - Land: 1.03 sq mi (2.67 km^{2})
  - Water: 0.039 sq mi (0.10 km^{2})
- Elevation: 532 ft (162 m)

Population (2020)
  - Total: 2,297
  - Estimate (2024): 2,227
  - Density: 2,046.6/sq mi (790.18/km^{2})
- Time zone: UTC-5 (Eastern (EST))
  - Summer (DST): UTC-4 (EDT)
- ZIP code: 45662
- Area code: 740
- FIPS code: 39-54166
- GNIS feature ID: 1086930
- Website: www.newbostonvillage.com

New Boston is a village in Scioto County, Ohio, United States, along the Ohio River. The population was 2,298 at the 2020 census. Apart from its southern boundary on the Ohio River, New Boston is entirely surrounded by the city of Portsmouth.

New Boston is served by the Portsmouth Public Library and the New Boston Local School District.

== History ==
=== Platting ===
The village was named after Boston, Massachusetts, the native home of a share of the first settlers. New Boston was platted, with 191 lots, on February 17, 1891, by James Skelton, A.T. Holcomb, and M. Stanton. On September 24, 1898, the Yorktown Addition was platted by Levi D. and Alice M. York. The Yorktown Addition has 384 additional lots, making the total number of lots 575. On October 23, 1900, the Stewartsville Addition was platted by M. T. Stewart. It has 41 lots, fewer than the previous two additions, bringing the total to 616 lots.

=== Industry ===
In 1898, a steel mill was established in the Yorktown Addition, which replaced the Burgess Steel Mill that burned in Portsmouth that same year. In 1900, the mill was sold to Crucible Steel of America. In 1902, the Portsmouth Steel Company acquired it. From 1909 to 1920, the mill became Whitaker-Glessner. In 1920, Whitaker-Glessner became part of Wheeling Steel Corporation. In July 1946, Portsmouth Steel Company acquired it from Wheeling Steel Corporation. On January 1, 1950, it was acquired by Detroit Steel. In 1969, Cyclops Corporation acquired the mill from Detroit Steel. In 1980, the mill shut down, and over 2,500 employees were displaced.

A picture of the steel mill in New Boston in 1913

=== Millbrook Park ===
In 1899, Levi York, who also was a founder of the steel mill, started to build Millbrook Park. In 1902, the park was operational, but not finished. The construction was finished in 1910, when the park was at its largest extent, at 85.4 acres. By 1935, the park was mostly destroyed.

=== Government ===
In 1906, New Boston was authorized to establish its own village government, electing William Kent as its first mayor. New Boston also established their Police Department that year, with Art Rutter being their first Marshal.

== Geography ==
According to the United States Census Bureau, the village has a total area of 1.14 square miles (2.95 km^{2}), of which 1.11 square miles (2.87 km^{2}) are land and 0.03 square miles (0.08 km^{2}) are water.

New Boston is entirely surrounding on the west, north, and east by the City of Portsmouth and to the south by the Ohio River.

== Demographics ==
Historical population
Census	Pop.	Note	%±
1870	111		—
1910	1,858		—
1920	4,817		159.3%
1930	5,931		23.1%
1940	6,024		1.6%
1950	4,734		−21.4%
1960	3,984		−15.8%
1970	3,325		−16.5%
1980	3,188		−4.1%
1990	2,717		−14.8%
2000	2,340		−13.9%
2010	2,272		−2.9%
2020	2,297		1.1%
U.S. Decennial Census

=== 2010 census ===
As of the census of 2010, there were 2,272 people, 1,065 households, and 537 families living in the village. The population density was 2,046.8 inhabitants per square mile (790.3/km^{2}). There were 1,173 housing units at an average density of 1,056.8 per square mile (408.0/km^{2}). The racial makeup of the village was 96.0% White, 1.1% African American, 0.3% Native American, 0.3% Asian, 0.3% from other races, and 2.1% from two or more races. Hispanic or Latino of any race were 0.9% of the population.

There were 1,065 households, of which 27.8% had children under the age of 18 living with them, 26.4% were married couples living together, 19.5% had a female householder with no husband present, 4.5% had a male householder with no wife present, and 49.6% were non-families. 44.9% of all households were made up of individuals, and 20.9% had someone living alone who was 65 years of age or older. The average household size was 2.08 and the average family size was 2.91.

The median age in the village was 40.3 years. 22.7% of residents were under the age of 18; 8.2% were between the ages of 18 and 24; 23.2% were from 25 to 44; 26.3% were from 45 to 64; and 19.5% were 65 years of age or older. The gender makeup of the village was 45.8% male and 54.2% female.

=== 2000 census ===
As of the census of 2000, there were 2,340 people, 1,106 households, and 572 families living in the village. The population density was 2,114.4 inhabitants per square mile (816.4/km^{2}). There were 1,248 housing units at an average density of 1,127.7 per square mile (435.4/km^{2}). The racial makeup of the village was 97.74% White, 0.13% African American, 0.34% Native American, 0.09% Asian, 0.21% from other races, and 1.50% from two or more races. Hispanic or Latino of any race were 0.64% of the population.

There were 1,106 households, out of which 24.4% had children under the age of 18 living with them, 29.0% were married couples living together, 19.9% had a female householder with no husband present, and 48.2% were non-families. 44.1% of all households were made up of individuals, and 24.3% had someone living alone who was 65 years of age or older. The average household size was 2.06 and the average family size was 2.87.

In the village, the population was spread out, with 23.4% under the age of 18, 9.9% from 18 to 24, 23.3% from 25 to 44, 21.9% from 45 to 64, and 21.5% who were 65 years of age or older. The median age was 39 years. For every 100 females, there were 70.1 males. For every 100 females age 18 and over, there were 62.9 males.

The median income for a household in the village was $15,861, and the median income for a family was $25,036. Males had a median income of $23,158 versus $19,044 for females. The per capita income for the village was $13,810. About 28.2% of families and 32.2% of the population were below the poverty line, including 41.9% of those under age 18 and 24.0% of those age 65 or over.

== Notable people ==
- Ron Giles (television executive), born 1942, television executive and an author
- Vern Riffe (1925-1997), Speaker of the Ohio House of Representatives
- Edith Evans Asbury, journalist and reporter with The New York Times

== See also ==
- List of cities and towns along the Ohio River

== Gallery ==
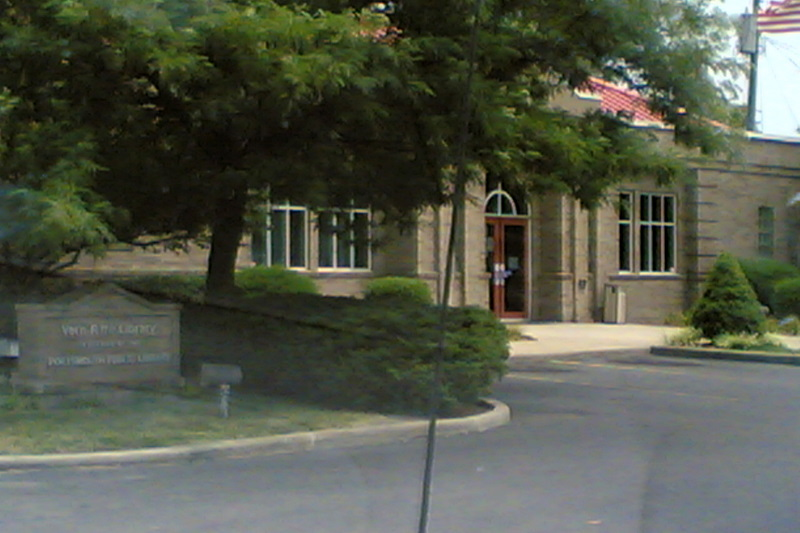
New Boston (Vern Riffe) Branch of the Portsmouth Public Library

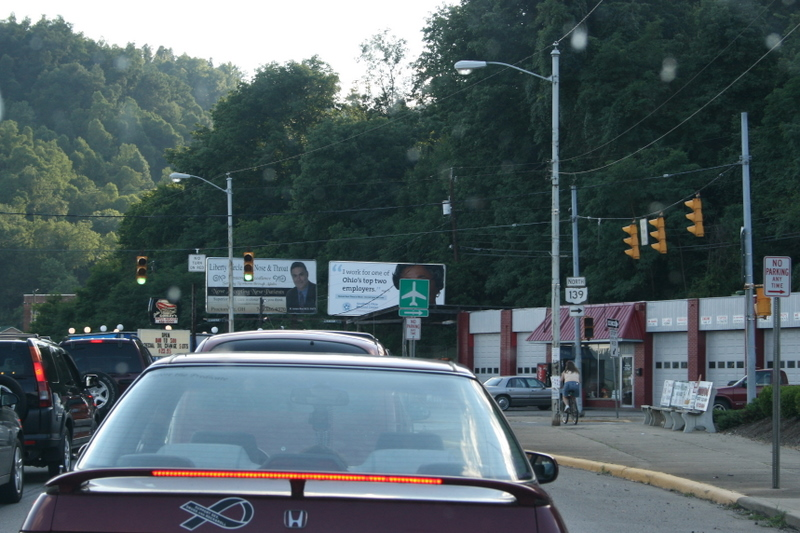
U.S. 52 & SR 139 intersection in New Boston. The Greater Portsmouth Regional Airport is 10 miles (16 km) north of this location.

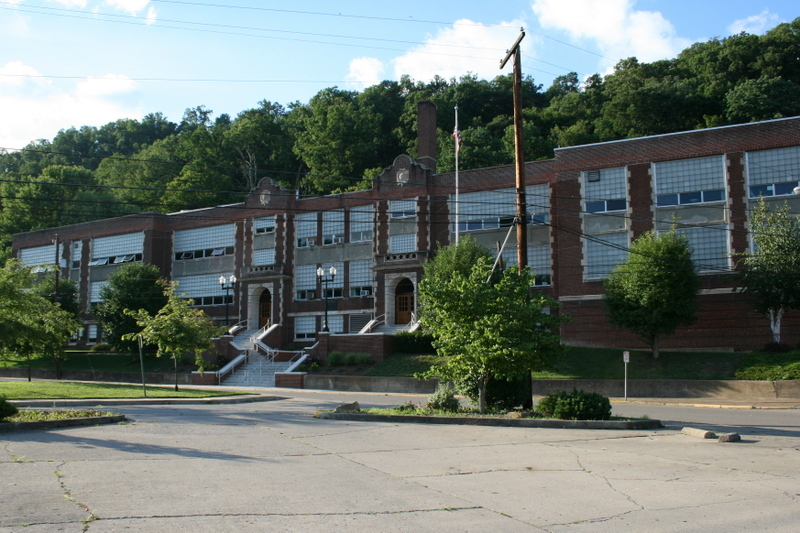
Former Glenwood High School (New Boston Local School District)
