= Ohio State Route 139 =

State highway in Ohio, US

State Route 139

Route information
- Maintained by ODOT
- Length: 33.99 mi (54.70 km)
- Existed: 1924–present

Major junctions
- South end: US 52 in New Boston
- North end: SR 93 in Jackson

Location
- Country: United States
- State: Ohio
- Counties: Scioto, Jackson

Highway system
- Ohio State Highway System; Interstate; US; State; Scenic
| ← SR 138 | → SR 140 |

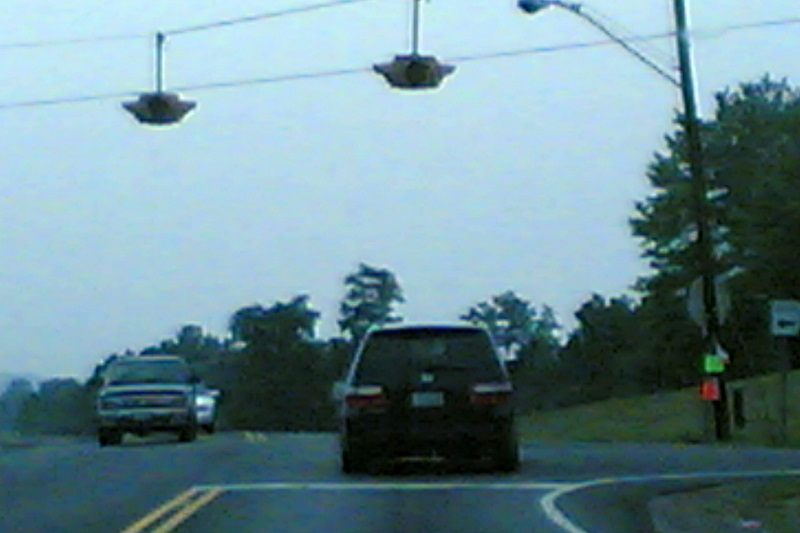
A view of the SR 139 & SR 335 intersection while traveling north on SR 335 in Minford

State Route 139 (SR 139) is a north–south road that stretches from New Boston at its southern terminus to Jackson, Ohio at its northern terminus. This route offers a quick, yet narrow and sharp route to Jackson. US 23 and SR 32 offer a more straight route with a higher speed limit, though less direct.

SR 139 begins at an intersection with US 52 in New Boston. The route goes north through a couple of traffic lights before passing through Portsmouth, Eden Park, Twin Valley, Rubyville, and Clarktown before it continues due east toward Minford. From there it crosses SR 335 and then begins to turn north once again. After reaching the Scioto County and Jackson County line, SR 279 splits off of State Route 139 and heads toward Oak Hill. SR 139 crosses SR 32 just outside Jackson and SR 776 within less than mile of downtown. The route then briefly overlaps SR 93 in downtown Jackson, terminating 0.15 miles (0.24 km) north where State Route 93 turns east.

== History ==
SR 139 was first designated in 1923 along the New Boston–Jackson route it has always followed. SR 139 fully replaced SR 402 which had been in existence since the creation of the state highway system in 1912. No major changes have occurred to SR 139's routing since it was first designated.

== Major intersections ==
| County | Location | mi | km | Destinations | Notes |
|---|---|---|---|---|---|
| Scioto | New Boston | 0.00 | 0.00 | US 52 east (Rhodes Avenue) | |
| Scioto | New Boston | 0.11 | 0.18 | US 52 west (Gallia Street) | |
| Scioto | Madison Township | 10.91 | 17.56 | SR 335 | |
| Jackson | Hamilton Township | 18.92 | 30.45 | SR 279 east – Oak Hill, Jackson Lake State Park | Western terminus of SR 279 |
| Jackson | Madison Township | 30.65 | 49.33 | SR 32 / SR 124 (James A. Rhodes Appalachian Highway) – Athens, Cincinnati | |
| Jackson | Jackson | 33.35 | 53.67 | SR 776 west (South Street) | Eastern terminus of SR 776 |
| Jackson | Jackson | 33.74 | 54.30 | SR 93 south (East Main Street) / Broadway Street | Southern end of SR 93 concurrency |
| Jackson | Jackson | 33.99 | 54.70 | SR 93 north (Bridge Street) / Main Street | Northern end of SR 93 concurrency |
1.000 mi = 1.609 km; 1.000 km = 0.621 mi: Concurrency terminus
