= Greater Portsmouth Regional Airport =

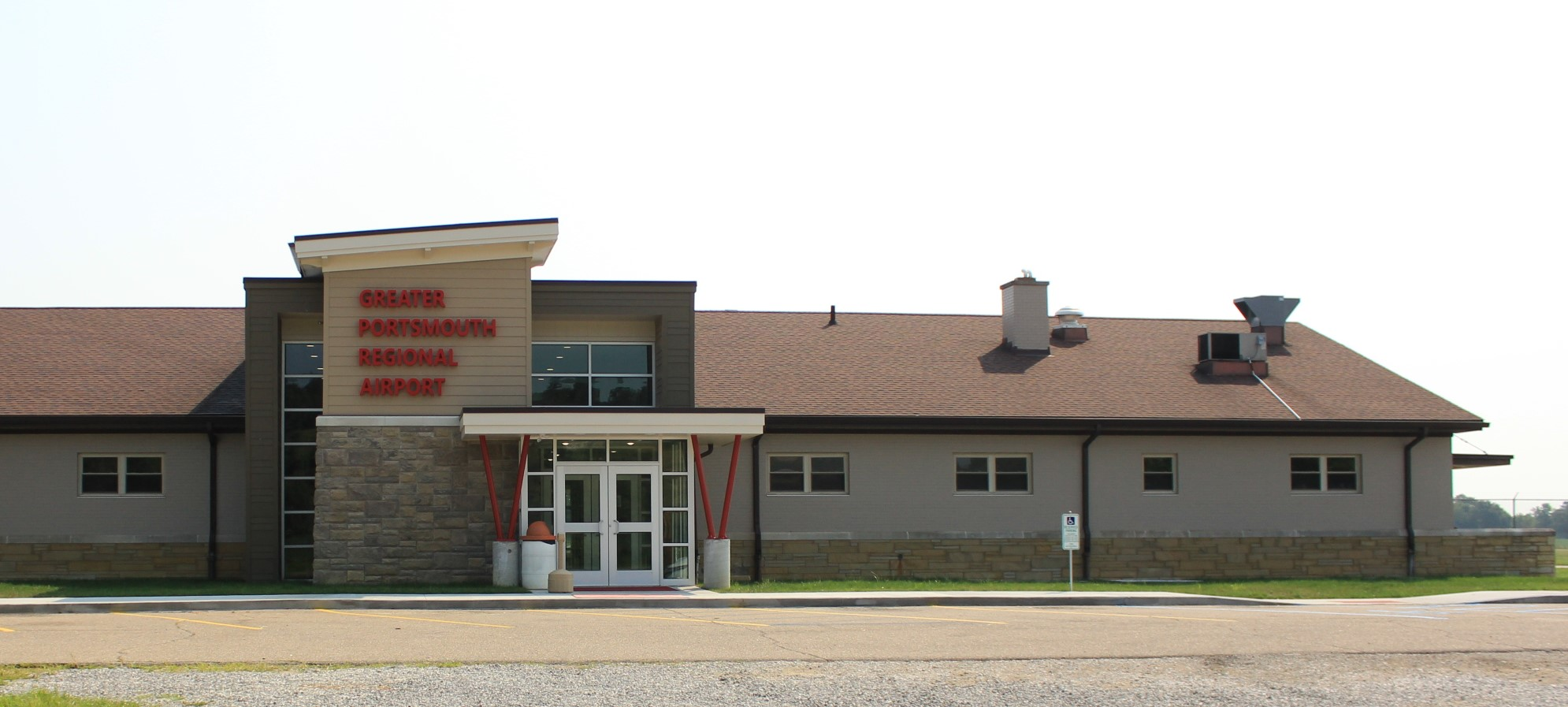
- IATA: PMH; ICAO: KPMH; FAA LID: PMH

Summary
- Airport type: Public
- Owner: Scioto County Airport Authority
- Serves: Portsmouth, Ohio
- Time zone: UTC−05:00 (-5)
  - Summer (DST): UTC−04:00 (-4)
- Elevation AMSL: 663 ft (202 m)
- Coordinates: 38°50′26″N 82°50′50″W

Map
- Location within Ohio Location within the United States

Runways
Direction	Length		Surface
Direction	ft	m	Surface
18/36	5,001	1,524	Asphalt

Statistics (2023)
- Aircraft operations: 45,625
- Based aircraft: 30
- Source: Federal Aviation Administration

Greater Portsmouth Regional Airport (IATA: PMH, ICAO: KPMH, FAA LID: PMH) (Scioto County Airport) is on State Route 335 in Minford, Ohio, 12 miles northeast of Portsmouth, in Scioto County, Ohio. It is owned by the Scioto County Airport Authority. The National Plan of Integrated Airport Systems for 2011–2015 categorized it as a general aviation facility.

== History ==
In 1954, a $400,000 federal grant had been authorized for the construction of an airport in Scioto County. A bid for construction of the Scioto County Airport was approved in early July 1955.

The airport opened on June 27, 1957. The previous airport was Raven Rock Field, near the Ohio River at 38.715°N 83.052°W a grass field with a 2,200-foot (670 m) run.

Lake Central Airlines served the airport from its opening until it merged into Allegheny Airlines in 1968; Allegheny pulled out in 1971. The airport has had no airline service since. Tyme Airlines of Columbus provided scheduled service in 1968. Cleveland based Wright Airlines served Portsmouth for a short time in the late 1960s.

Service on the three airlines in the 1960s are as follows. Lake Central used Douglas DC-3 & Nord 262 aircraft to Cincinnati. After merging with Allegheny, the aircraft was upgraded to Convair 580 prop jets that flew to both Cincinnati and Parkersburg, WV. Tyme Airlines flew small Piper Aztec equipment to both Columbus and Huntington, WV. The fourth airline, Wright Airlines, used Beech 18 aircraft and also served the Columbus and Huntington WV airports.

The airport manager, Ralph Kilpatrick, was killed in a plane crash in August 1975.

A federal grant to purchase 12 acres (4.9 ha) of land to extend the runway was approved in 1984.

By February 2020, plans had been announced for the Southern Ohio Aeronautical Regional (SOAR) Airport Business Park. It received a grant from the state in August 2023 to construct a building for Minford Ambulance at the site.

== Facilities and aircraft ==
The airport covers 246 acres (100 ha) at an elevation of 663 feet (202 m). Its one runway, 18/36, measures 5,001 by 100 feet (1,524 x 30 m) asphalt.

The airport has a fixed-base operator that offers fuel services along with a small snack bar, a restaurant, a couple of hangars, mechanics, and a pilot snooze room.

In the year ending July 26, 2023, the airport had 45,625 aircraft operations, an average of 125 per day. It was 99% general aviation, <1% air taxi, and <1% military. For the same time period, 24 aircraft were based at the airport: 23 single-engine airplanes and 1 helicopter.

The airport commission is planning to upgrade the airport soon with an AWOS weather system, PAPI lighting, and an extension of the taxiway to the north end of the runway.

== Accidents and incidents ==
- On 24 July 1994, a Piper Cherokee crashed while taking off from the airport, killing the pilot and four passengers and injuring a passenger.
- On 23 July 1996, a homebuilt airplane crashed at the airport, injuring the pilot.

== See also ==
- List of airports in Ohio
