= Senator Fort =

Senator Fort may refer to:

- George Franklin Fort (1809–1872), New Jersey State Senate
- Greenbury L. Fort (1825–1883), Illinois State Senate
- Robert Boal Fort (1867–1904), Illinois State Senate
- Vincent Fort (born 1956), Georgia State Senate
