= Vernon Township, Ohio =

Vernon Township, Ohio may refer to:

- Vernon Township, Clinton County, Ohio
- Vernon Township, Crawford County, Ohio
- Vernon Township, Scioto County, Ohio
- Vernon Township, Trumbull County, Ohio

== See also ==
- Vernon Township (disambiguation)
