= Green Township, Scioto County, Ohio =

Township in Ohio, US

- Township
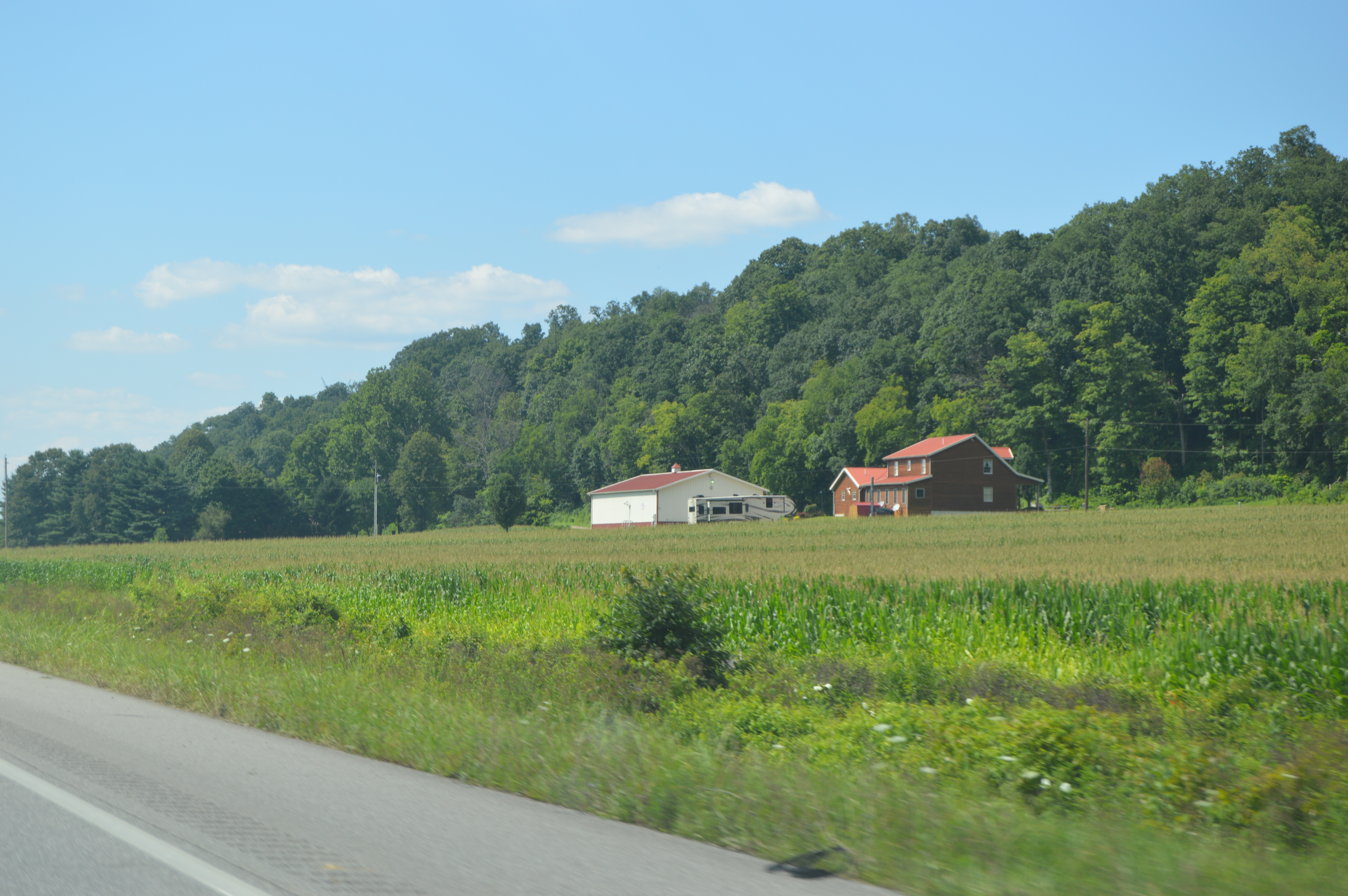
- Fields along U.S. Route 52 east of Franklin Furnace

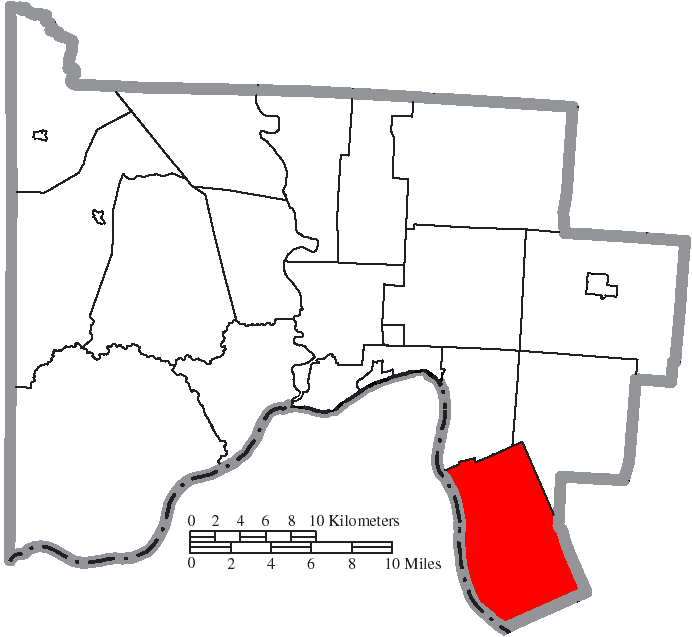
- Location of Green Township in Scioto County
- Coordinates: 38°39′14″N 82°49′31″W
- Country: United States
- State: Ohio
- County: Scioto

Area
  - Total: 39.3 sq mi (101.7 km^{2})
  - Land: 38.8 sq mi (100.4 km^{2})
  - Water: 0.50 sq mi (1.3 km^{2})
- Elevation: 883 ft (269 m)

Population (2020)
  - Total: 4,107
  - Density: 106/sq mi (40.9/km^{2})
- Time zone: UTC-5 (Eastern (EST))
  - Summer (DST): UTC-4 (EDT)
- FIPS code: 39-31836
- GNIS feature ID: 1086925

Green Township is one of the sixteen townships of Scioto County, Ohio, United States. The 2020 census counted 4,107 people in the township.

== Geography ==
Located in the far south of the county along the Ohio River, it borders the following townships:

- Porter Township - north
- Vernon Township - northeast
- Elizabeth Township, Lawrence County - east
- Hamilton Township, Lawrence County - southeast

Greenup County, Kentucky lies across the Ohio River to the west.

No municipalities are located in Green Township, although the census-designated place of Franklin Furnace lies in the northeastern part of the township, and the unincorporated community of Haverhill lies in the south of the township. Both of these communities are Ohio River towns.

== Name and history ==
Named after Griffin Green, a land agent, it is one of sixteen Green Townships statewide.

Origins of Green Township date to between 1803 and 1811. The community of Haverhill was settled as early as 1797. The Powellsville community dates to July 31, 1846.

Green Township comprises most of the land that was the French Grant that was paid out by Congress in 1785 to French colonists were defrauded by the Scioto Company.

== Government ==
The township is governed by a three-member board of trustees, who are elected in November of odd-numbered years to a four-year term beginning on the following January 1. Two are elected in the year after the presidential election and one is elected in the year before it. There is also an elected township fiscal officer, who serves a four-year term beginning on April 1 of the year after the election, which is held in November of the year before the presidential election. Vacancies in the fiscal officership or on the board of trustees are filled by the remaining trustees.
