= Franklin Furnace, Ohio =

- Census-designated place
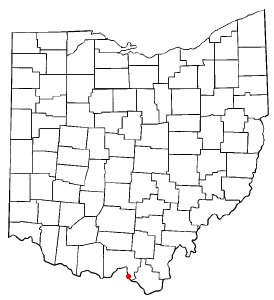
- Location of Franklin Furnace, Ohio
- Coordinates: 38°37′24″N 82°50′53″W
- Country: United States
- State: Ohio
- County: Scioto
- Township: Green

Area
  - Total: 2.74 sq mi (7.10 km^{2})
  - Land: 2.36 sq mi (6.10 km^{2})
  - Water: 0.39 sq mi (1.00 km^{2})
- Elevation: 538 ft (164 m)

Population (2020)
  - Total: 1,525
  - Density: 647.5/sq mi (250.01/km^{2})
- Time zone: UTC-5 (Eastern (EST))
  - Summer (DST): UTC-4 (EDT)
- ZIP code: 45629
- Area code: 740
- FIPS code: 39-28532
- GNIS feature ID: 2393011

Franklin Furnace is a census-designated place (CDP) in Scioto County, Ohio, United States, along the Ohio River. The population was 1,525 at the 2020 census.

== History ==
Franklin Furnace was the name of an early iron ore blast furnace built in eastern Scioto County in 1826. The community which grew in the area is named after the furnace. Its name ultimately is derived from Benjamin Franklin. It is located within the land that was the French Grant by Congress in 1795 to a group of French colonists were defrauded by the Scioto Company. A post office called Franklin Furnace has been in operation since 1828.

== Geography ==
According to the United States Census Bureau, the CDP has a total area of 2.7 square miles (7.0 km^{2}), of which 2.4 square miles (6.2 km^{2}) is land and 0.4 square miles (1.0 km^{2}), or 13.14%, is water.

== Demographics ==
Historical population
Census	Pop.	Note	%±
2020	1,525		—
U.S. Decennial Census

As of the census of 2000, there were 1,537 people, 519 households, and 389 families living in the CDP. The population density was 644.8 inhabitants per square mile (249.0/km^{2}). There were 588 housing units at an average density of 246.7 per square mile (95.3/km^{2}). The racial makeup of the CDP was 91.09% White, 7.22% African American, 0.78% Native American, 0.07% Asian, 0.07% from other races, and 0.78% from two or more races. Hispanic or Latino of any race were 0.46% of the population.

There were 519 households, out of which 30.8% had children under the age of 18 living with them, 57.4% were married couples living together, 13.3% had a female householder with no husband present, and 24.9% were non-families. 21.4% of all households were made up of individuals, and 8.7% had someone living alone who was 65 years of age or older. The average household size was 2.44 and the average family size was 2.80.

In the CDP the population was spread out, with 31.9% under the age of 18, 11.3% from 18 to 24, 21.3% from 25 to 44, 23.3% from 45 to 64, and 12.1% who were 65 years of age or older. The median age was 31 years. For every 100 females, there were 129.1 males. For every 100 females age 18 and over, there were 99.2 males. The median income for a household in the CDP was $27,279, and the median income for a family was $30,156. Males had a median income of $27,216 versus $22,292 for females. The per capita income for the CDP was $12,998. About 13.2% of families and 12.5% of the population were below the poverty line, including 13.8% of those under age 18 and 7.3% of those age 65 or over.

== Public services ==
Franklin Furnace residents are served by the Green Local School District and a volunteer fire department. The high school mascot is the Bobcat.

== See also ==
- List of cities and towns along the Ohio River

== Notable people ==
- Kylan Darnell, 2022 Miss Ohio Teen USA
- Ed Hock, Major League Baseball player
- Marti Dodson is a singer/songwriter and platinum recording artist in Saving Jane. He is also a country songwriter with songs recorded by Luke Bryan, Thompson Square, and Lainey Wilson.
