= Robert Boal Fort =

American politician

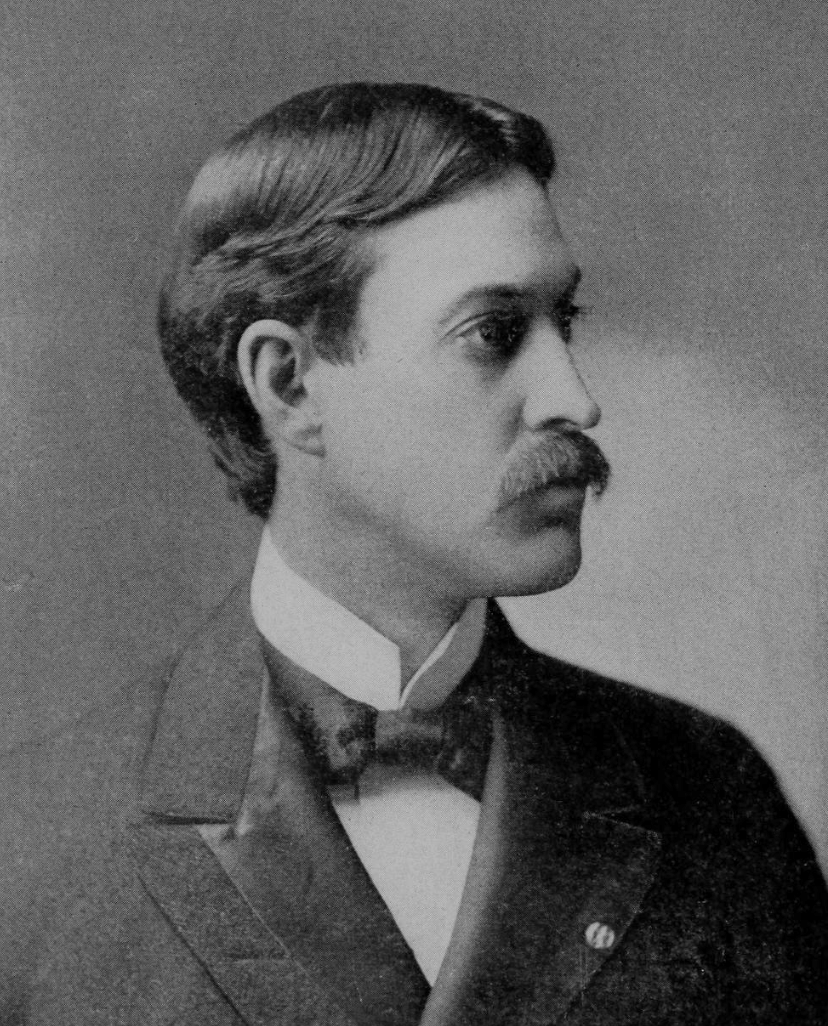

Member of the Illinois Senate
- In office 1902 – 1904
- Preceded by: re-districted
- Succeeded by: Ira M. Lish
- Constituency: 16th District
- In office 1896 – 1902
- Preceded by: Charles N. Barnes
- Succeeded by: re-districted
- Constituency: 20th District

Mayor of Lacon, Illinois
- In office 1895

Personal details
- Born: April 25, 1867 Lacon, Illinois
- Died: May 21, 1904 (aged 37) Lacon, Illinois
- Party: Republican
- Profession: Farmer and rancher
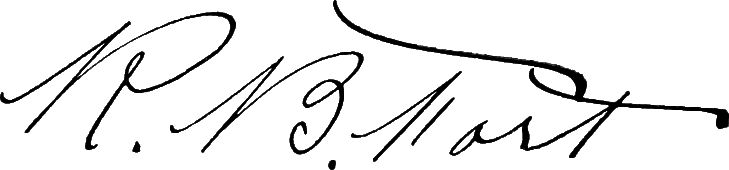
- Signature

Robert Boal Fort (April 25, 1867 – May 21, 1904) was an American politician from Illinois. The son of Greenbury L. Fort, he was the third consecutive generation of his family to serve in the Illinois Senate for the district representing Marshall County, Illinois. Fort also served as a captain in the Spanish–American War and was the mayor of Lacon, Illinois.

== Biography ==
Robert Boal Fort was born in Lacon, Illinois, on April 25, 1867. He was the only son of state senator Greenbury L. Fort, who would later serve eight years in the United States House of Representatives. His grandfather, Robert Boal, was also a state senator and was an associate of Abraham Lincoln. Fort attended public schools in Washington, D.C., then attended the Wyman Institute and Phillips Exeter Academy before studying abroad. Fort then returned to Illinois, assuming his father's farming and ranching interests.

Fort was interested in politics at a young age, and was named to the Marshall County Republican Party Committee as soon as he turned eighteen. Fort joined the Illinois National Guard, serving eight years. He held the position until 1895, when he was elected mayor of Lacon. After a year, Fort was elected to the Illinois Senate, serving from 1896 to 1904. Fort was a delegate to the 1896 Republican National Convention. In 1898, Fort visited Cuba, and convinced that war was imminent, raised a company of cavalry volunteers. He was named captain of Troop L of the 1st Regiment Illinois Volunteer Cavalry when the Spanish–American War broke out.

Fort enjoyed traveling, and visited all of the capital cities in Europe. He also founded the Lacon Public Library. Fort was an Episcopalian. He died at St. John's Hospital in Lacon on May 21, 1904, and was buried in Lacon Cemetery.
