= Herman W. Snow =

American politician

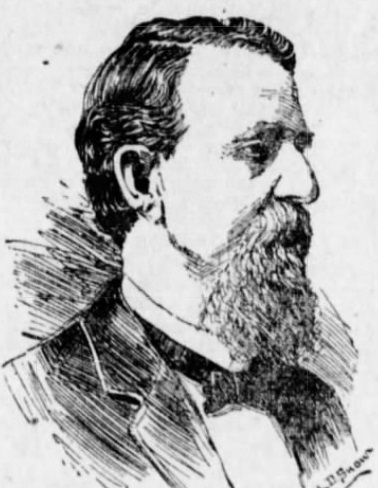
- The Pantagraph (Bloomington, IL), August 26, 1914

Sergeant at Arms of the United States House of Representatives
- In office August 7, 1893 – December 2, 1895
- Leader: Charles Frederick Crisp
- Preceded by: Samuel S. Yoder
- Succeeded by: Benjamin F. Russell

Member of the U.S. House of Representatives from Illinois's 9th district
- In office March 4, 1891 – March 3, 1893
- Preceded by: Lewis E. Payson
- Succeeded by: Hamilton K. Wheeler

Member of the Illinois House of Representatives
- In office 1872–1874

Personal details
- Born: July 3, 1836 Michigan City, Indiana, U.S.
- Died: August 25, 1914 (aged 78) Kankakee, Illinois, U.S.
- Party: Democratic

Herman Wilber Snow (July 3, 1836 – August 25, 1914) was an American politician who served as a U.S. representative from Illinois, the sergeant at arms of the United States House of Representatives, and a member of the Illinois House of Representatives.

== Biography ==
Born in Michigan City, Indiana, Snow moved with his parents to Madisonville, Kentucky, where he attended the public schools. He moved to Sheldon, Illinois and taught school several years before he commenced the study of law. He was admitted to the bar and practiced.

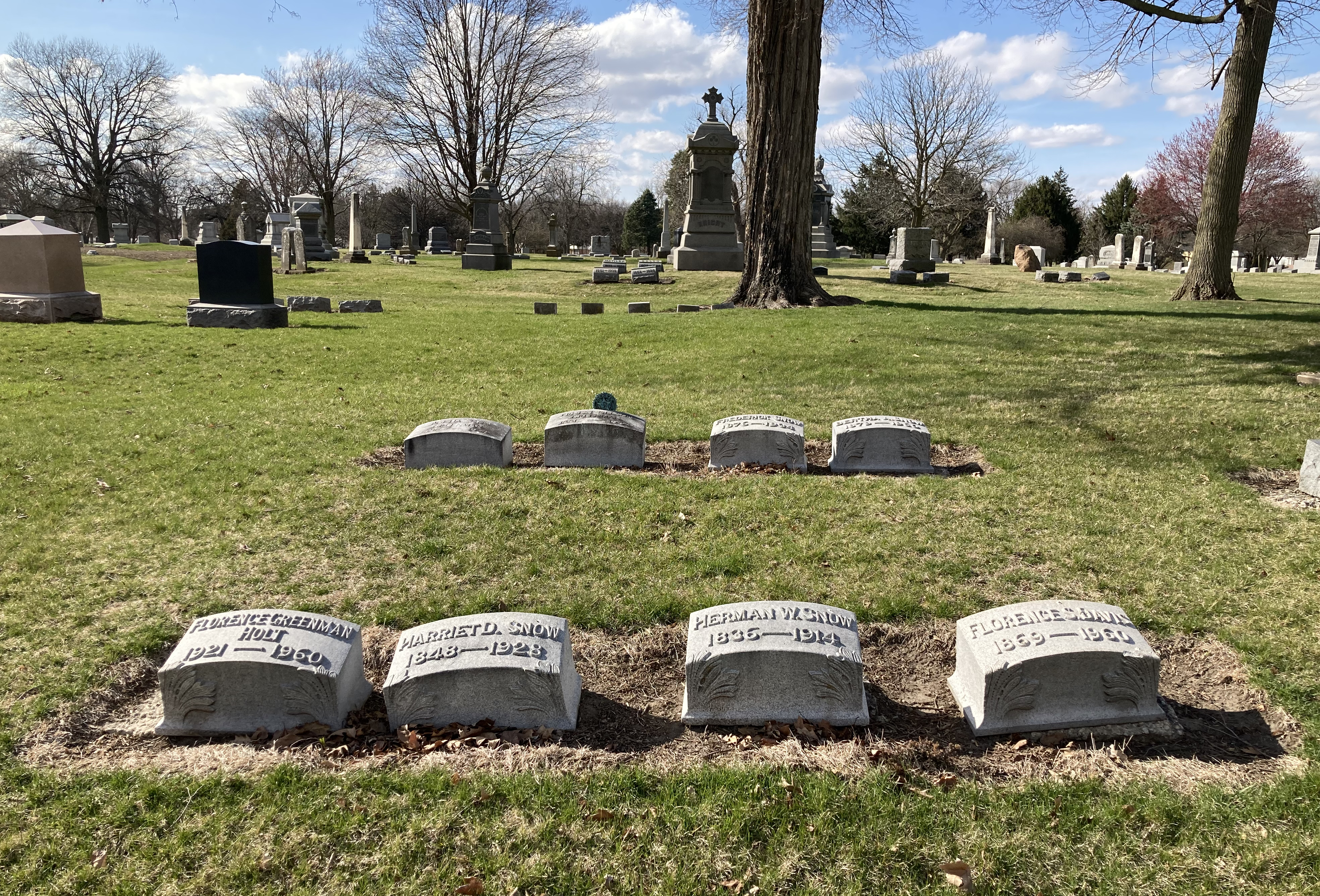
Snow's grave (front row, second from right) at Mound Grove Cemetery

During the Civil War, Snow enlisted as a private in the One Hundred and Thirty-ninth Regiment, Illinois Volunteer Infantry, where he rose to the rank of captain. He re-enlisted in the One Hundred and Fifty-first Regiment, Illinois Volunteer Infantry, and was promoted to the rank of lieutenant colonel. He was provost marshal general of Georgia on Major General James B. Steedman's staff. At the expiration of his service, he taught in the Chicago High School for three years. He returned to Sheldon and engaged in banking, and also served as member of the Illinois House of Representatives from 1872 to 1874.

Snow was elected as a Democrat to the Fifty-second Congress (March 4, 1891 – March 3, 1893). He was an unsuccessful candidate for reelection in 1892 to the Fifty-third Congress. He later served as sergeant at arms of the House of Representatives during the Fifty-third Congress. He moved to Kankakee, Illinois, and resumed banking. He died from bronchial pneumonia at his home in Kankakee on August 25, 1914, and is interred in Mound Grove Cemetery.

U.S. House of Representatives
Preceded by Lewis E. Payson	Member of the U.S. House of Representatives from Illinois's 9th congressional district 1891–1893	Succeeded by Hamilton K. Wheeler
Preceded by Samuel S. Yoder	Sergeant at Arms of the United States House of Representatives; 1893–1895	Succeeded by Benjamin F. Russell
