= Greenbury L. Fort =

American politician

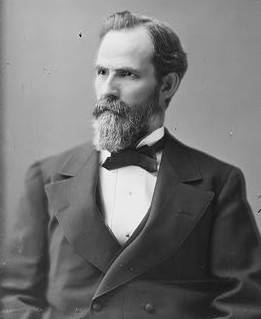

Member of the U.S. House of Representatives from Illinois's 8th district
- In office March 4, 1873 – March 3, 1881
- Preceded by: James Carroll Robinson
- Succeeded by: Lewis E. Payson

Member of the Illinois Senate
- In office 1866

Personal details
- Born: October 17, 1825 French Grant, Ohio, U.S.
- Died: January 13, 1883 (aged 57) Lacon, Illinois, U.S.
- Party: Republican

Greenbury Lafayette Fort (October 17, 1825 – January 13, 1883) was a U.S. representative from Illinois.

== Biography ==
Born in French Grant, Ohio, Fort moved with his parents to Marshall County, Illinois, in April 1834. He completed preparatory studies and attended Rock River Seminary. He studied law. He was admitted to the bar in 1847 and commenced practice in Lacon, Illinois. Fort was elected sheriff in 1850. He served as clerk of Marshall County in 1852, and was a county judge in 1857.

He was appointed a second lieutenant in the 11th Illinois Volunteer Infantry Regiment, on April 30, 1861. He was promoted through the ranks to lieutenant colonel and quartermaster. He was brevetted major and lieutenant colonel of Volunteers on March 13, 1865.

He served as a member of the Illinois State Senate in 1866.

Fort was elected as a Republican to the Forty-third and to the three succeeding Congresses (March 4, 1873 – March 3, 1881). He was not a candidate for renomination in 1880. He retired from public life. He died in Lacon, Illinois, January 13, 1883. He was interred in Lacon Cemetery. He married Clara Boal, the daughter of Robert Boal, and was the father of state senator Robert Boal Fort.

U.S. House of Representatives
Preceded by James C. Robinson	Member of the U.S. House of Representatives from Illinois's 8th congressional district March 4, 1873 – March 3, 1881	Succeeded by Lewis E. Payson
