= Haverhill, Ohio =

- Unincorporated community
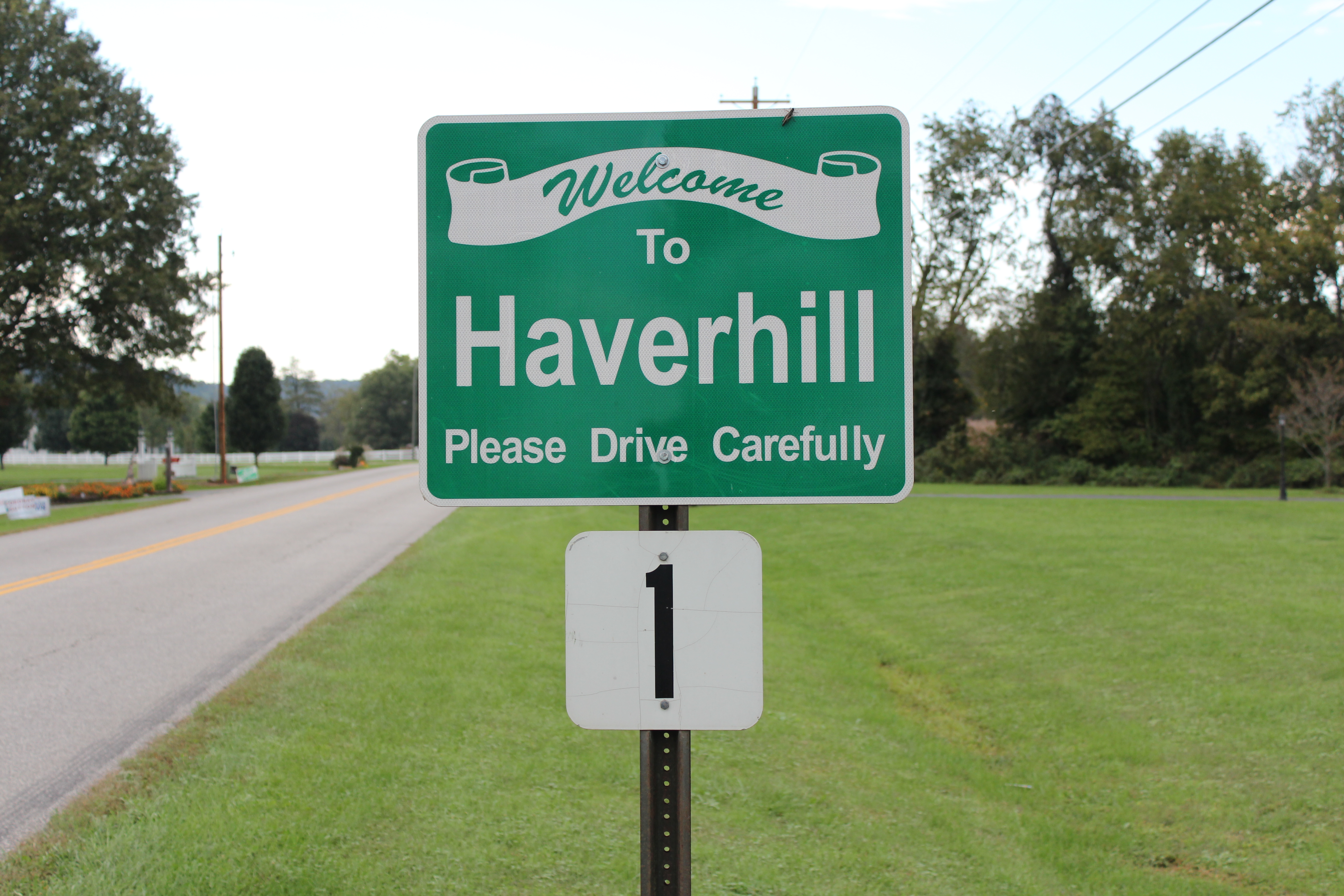
- Haverhill community sign on Scioto County Road 1 west

- Location within Ohio
- Coordinates: 38°35′05″N 82°49′56″W
- Country: United States
- State: Ohio
- County: Scioto
- Township: Green
- Elevation: 548 ft (167 m)
- Time zone: UTC-5 (Eastern (EST))
  - Summer (DST): UTC-4 (EDT)
- ZIP codes: 45636
- Area codes: 740, 220
- GNIS feature ID: 1076026

Haverhill (/ˈhævərhɪl/ HAV-ər-hil) is an unincorporated community in southern Green Township, Scioto County, Ohio, United States. It has a post office with the ZIP code 45636. An Ohio River town, it is located between Hanging Rock and Franklin Furnace.

== History ==
Haverhill was platted in 1848, and named after Haverhill, New Hampshire, the native home of a share of the early settlers. A post office called Haverhill has been in operation since 1852.
