= Vernon Township, Michigan =

Vernon Township is the name of some places in the U.S. state of Michigan:

- Vernon Township, Isabella County, Michigan
- Vernon Township, Shiawassee County, Michigan

== See also ==
- Vernon, Michigan, a village in Shiawassee County
- Vernon Township (disambiguation)
