= Porter Township, Ohio =

Porter Township, Ohio may refer to:

- Porter Township, Delaware County, Ohio
- Porter Township, Scioto County, Ohio
