= Vernon Township, Indiana =

Vernon Township, Indiana may refer to one of the following places:

- Vernon Township, Hancock County, Indiana
- Vernon Township, Jackson County, Indiana
- Vernon Township, Jennings County, Indiana
- Vernon Township, Washington County, Indiana

See also

- Vernon Township (disambiguation)
