= Robert Boal =

American politician and physician

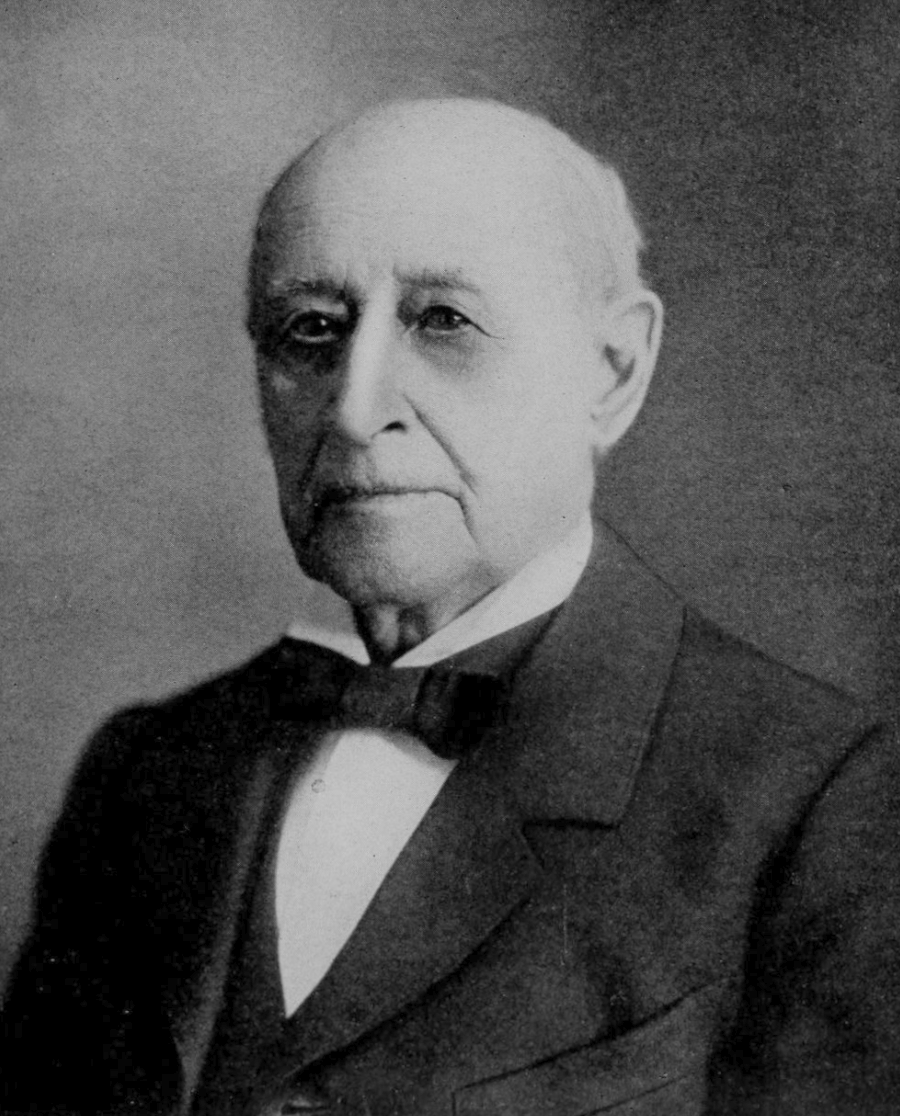

Member of the Illinois Senate from the Marshall County district
- In office 1844 – 1848
- Succeeded by: re-districted

Member of the Illinois House of Representatives from the 42nd district
- In office 1854 – 1858
- Preceded by: re-districted
- Succeeded by: J. S. McCall

Personal details
- Born: November 15, 1806 Dauphin County, Pennsylvania, U.S.
- Died: June 12, 1903 (aged 96) Lacon, Illinois, U.S.
- Party: Whig; Republican
- Profession: Physician
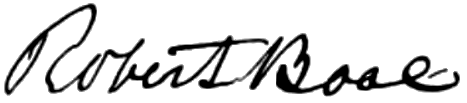
- Signature

Robert Boal (November 15, 1806 – June 12, 1903) was an American politician and physician from Pennsylvania. After schooling in Ohio, Boal moved to Lacon, Illinois, where he practiced medicine for thirty years. Boal was elected to the Illinois Senate in 1844, serving for four years. He returned to the General Assembly with an 1856 election to the Illinois House of Representatives. After serving a pair of two-year terms, he was made a trustee of the Illinois Institute of the Deaf and Dumb. During the Civil War, Boal examined soldiers from his congressional district. He later directed the Peoria State Hospital.

== Biography ==
Robert Boal was born near Harrisburg, Pennsylvania, on November 15, 1806. He was orphaned at a young age and was raised by an uncle in Cincinnati, Ohio. Boal attended the Cincinnati Literary College and the Ohio Medical College, graduating from the latter institution in 1828. He remained in Cincinnati to practice medicine. In 1834, Boal moved to Central Illinois, eventually settling in Columbia (today Lacon). Boal practiced medicine there for the next thirty years.

Boal first became active in politics in 1844, when he was elected to the Illinois Senate as a Whig, serving four years. He campaigned on behalf of Abraham Lincoln in his 1846 US congress bid; Boal's mostly Democratic district was deemed critical to Lincoln's success. Boal opposed the Kansas-Nebraska Act and successfully ran for a seat on the Illinois House of Representatives in 1854. He was re-elected to another two-year term in 1856. Lincoln encouraged Boal to seek the Speakership of the house, recommending that Boal practice debating with Isaac N. Arnold.

During his second house term, Boal was appointed to a joint committee to oversee conditions at the Illinois State Hospitals for the Insane, Blind, and Deaf & Dumb. After the legislature approved new oversight over those institutions, Boal was named trustee of the Deaf & Dumb Institute. He held this role for seventeen years. He was also a co-founder and director of the Cottage Hospital of Peoria. Boal was also a delegate at the Bloomington Convention, the first organization of the state Republican Party. Four years later, he was an alternate delegate to the 1860 Republican National Convention.

During the Civil War, Boal was appointed Surgeon of the Board of Enrollment of Illinois's 5th congressional district, at the time covering Putnam, Marshall, Peoria, Stark, Henry, Bureau, and Knox counties. His duties included the examination of 5,000 soldiers for the Union.

Boal married Christiana Walker Sinclair on May 12, 1831. They had two sons and a daughter; son James Sinclair served as Assistant US District Attorney for ten years. Daughter Clara married general Greenbury L. Fort; their son Robert Boal later served in the state senate. Boal was originally a Presbyterian, but later aligned with the Protestant Episcopal Church. He died in Lacon on June 12, 1903, and was buried in Springdale Cemetery in Peoria.
