= Marshall County Courthouse (Illinois) =

Local government building in the United States

Coordinates: 41°1′30″N 89°24′28″W

The Marshall County Courthouse, located at 122 North Prairie Street in Lacon, Illinois, is the county courthouse serving Marshall County, Illinois. Built in 1853-1854, it is a building of Georgian Revival architecture. The cost of construction was $7,352, exclusive of subsequent additions to the building.

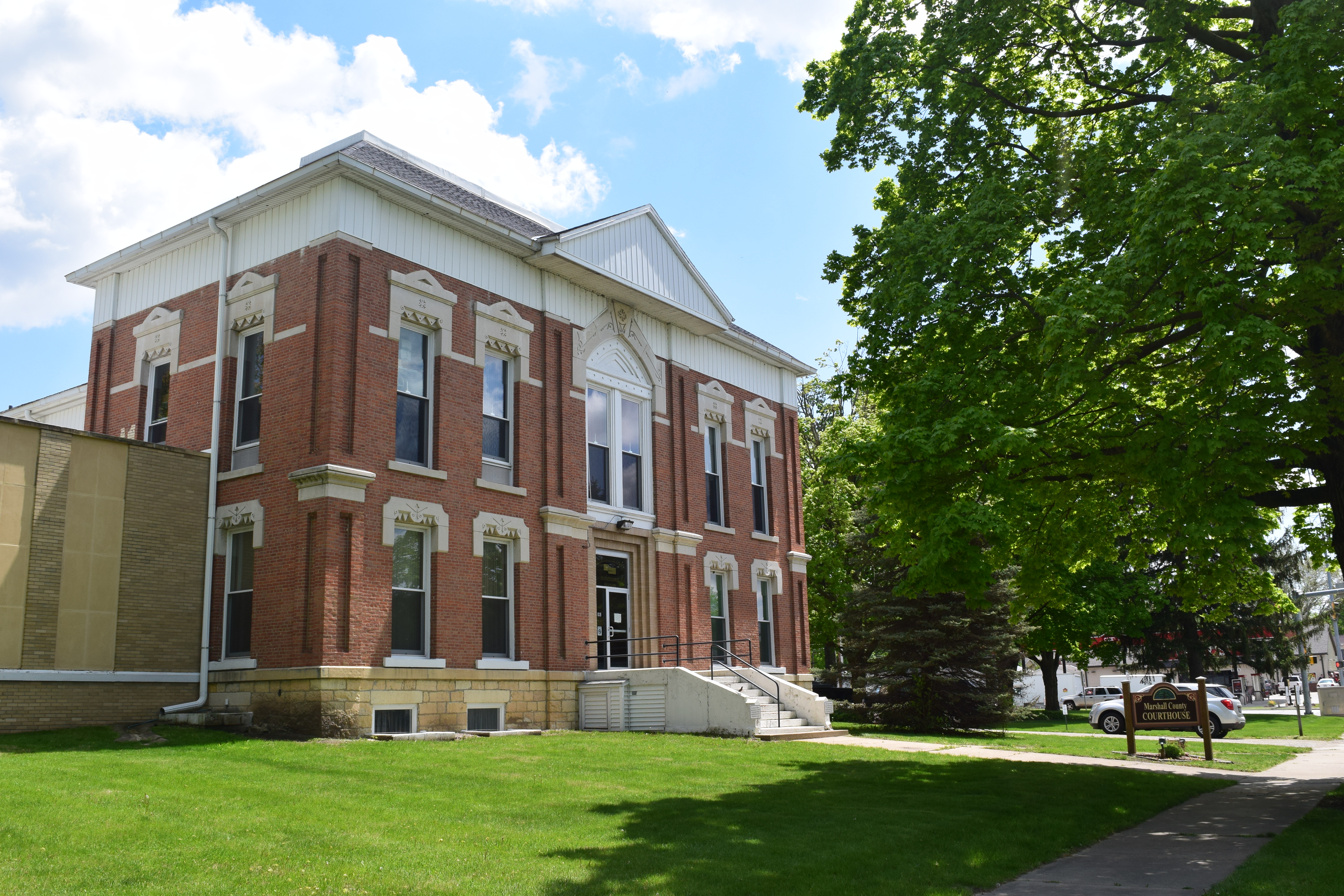
Marshall County Courthouse

== Description ==
The Marshall County Courthouse holds court sessions on cases brought to it within its 10th Circuit jurisdiction. It is also the meeting place of the elected county board, and contains offices for the county. The 1853-1854 Marshall County Courthouse is the second building to serve this purpose. The first courthouse operated from 1840 until it burned on January 5, 1853.
