= Lewis E. Payson =

American politician

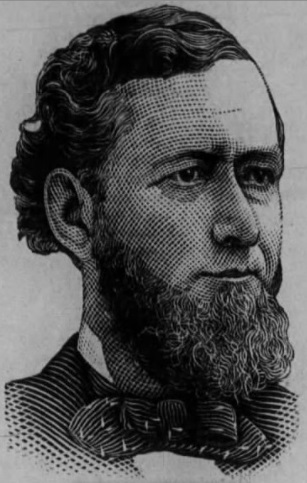
- Buffalo Weekly Express (Buffalo, NY), January 28, 1886

Member of the U.S. House of Representatives from Illinois
- In office March 4, 1881 – March 3, 1891
- Preceded by: Greenbury L. Fort (8th); John H. Lewis (9th)
- Succeeded by: William Cullen (8th); Herman W. Snow (9th)
- Constituency: 8th district (1881-83); 9th district (1883-91)

Personal details
- Born: September 17, 1840 Providence, Rhode Island, U.S.
- Died: October 4, 1909 (aged 69) Washington, D.C., U.S.
- Resting place: Rock Creek Cemetery; Washington, D.C., U.S.
- Party: Republican

Lewis Edwin Payson (September 17, 1840 – October 4, 1909) was a U.S. representative from Illinois.

== Biography ==
Born in Providence, Rhode Island, Payson moved with his parents to Illinois in 1852. He attended the common schools and Lombard University, Galesburg, Illinois. After concluding his law studies, he was admitted to the bar and commenced practice in Ottawa, Illinois in 1862. He moved to Pontiac, Illinois, in January 1865 and continued the practice of law. He served as judge of the county court 1869-1873.

Payson was elected as a Republican to the Forty-seventh and to the four succeeding Congresses (March 4, 1881 – March 3, 1891). He served as chairman of the Committee on Public Lands (Fifty-first Congress). He resumed the practice of law.

== Death ==
Payson died in Washington, D.C., October 4, 1909 and was interred in Rock Creek Cemetery.

== Legacy ==
A number of towns are named after Lewis Payson including Payson, Arizona, and Payson, Utah.

== Sources ==
- United States Congress. "Lewis E. Payson (id: P000157)". Biographical Directory of the United States Congress.

U.S. House of Representatives
Preceded by Greenbury L. Fort	Member of the U.S. House of Representatives from Illinois's 8th congressional district March 4, 1881 - March 3, 1883	Succeeded by William Cullen
Preceded by John H. Lewis	Member of the U.S. House of Representatives from Illinois's 9th congressional district March 4, 1883 - March 3, 1891	Succeeded by Herman W. Snow
