= Harrison Township, Scioto County, Ohio =

Township in Ohio, US

- Township
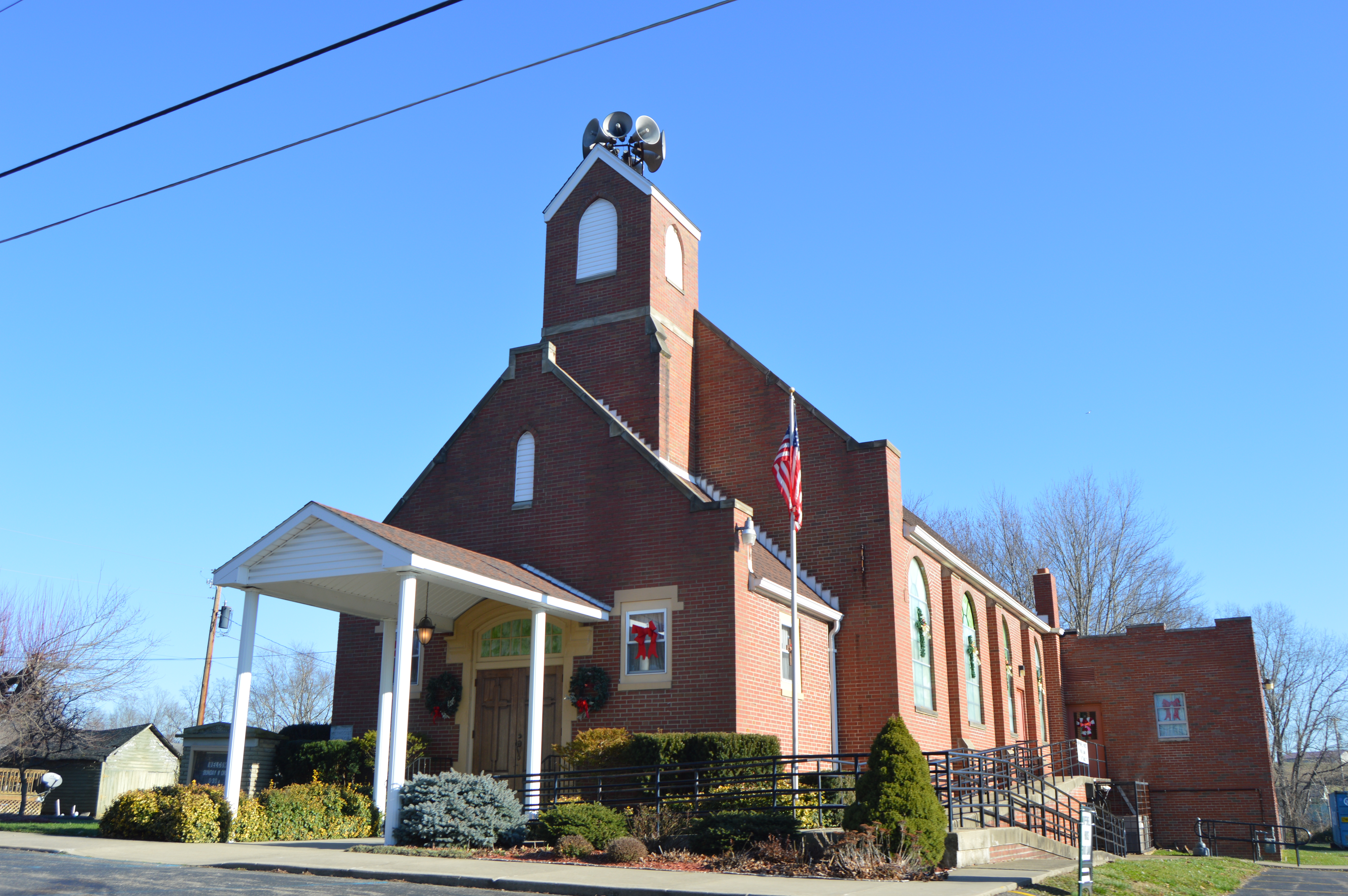
- Methodist church at Minford

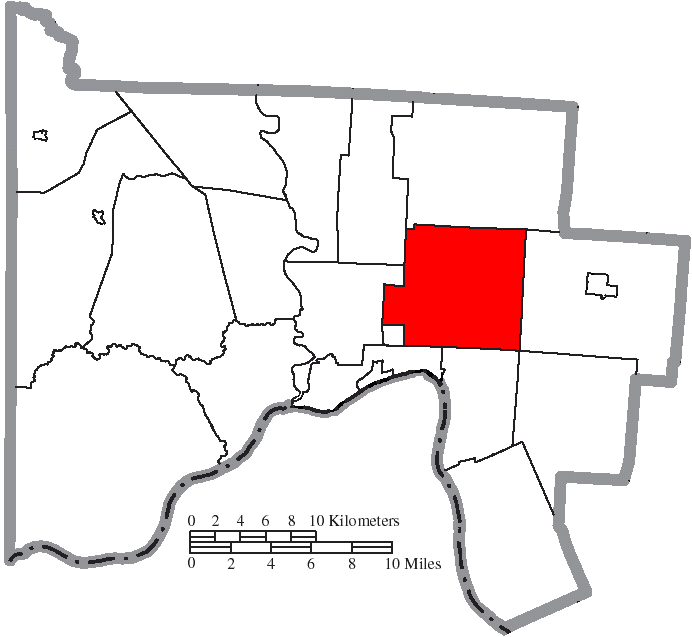
- Location of Harrison Township in Scioto County
- Coordinates: 38°48′15″N 82°50′54″W
- Country: United States
- State: Ohio
- County: Scioto

Area
  - Total: 37.0 sq mi (95.9 km^{2})
  - Land: 37.0 sq mi (95.8 km^{2})
  - Water: 0.039 sq mi (0.1 km^{2})
- Elevation: 518 ft (158 m)

Population (2020)
  - Total: 4,275
  - Density: 116/sq mi (44.6/km^{2})
- Time zone: UTC-5 (Eastern (EST))
  - Summer (DST): UTC-4 (EDT)
- FIPS code: 39-34020
- GNIS feature ID: 1086926

Harrison Township is one of the sixteen townships of Scioto County, Ohio, United States. The 2020 census counted 4,275 people in the township.

== Geography ==
Located in the eastern part of the county, it borders the following townships:

- Madison Township - north
- Bloom Township - east
- Vernon Township - southeast corner
- Porter Township - south
- Clay Township - west

No municipalities are located in Harrison Township, although the census-designated place of Minford lies along the border with Madison Township.

== Name and history ==
Named in honor of General William Henry Harrison, it is one of nineteen Harrison Townships statewide.

Harrison Township was established March 6, 1832.

== Government ==
The township is governed by a three-member board of trustees, who are elected in November of odd-numbered years to a four-year term beginning on the following January 1. Two are elected in the year after the presidential election and one is elected in the year before it. There is also an elected township fiscal officer, who serves a four-year term beginning on April 1 of the year after the election, which is held in November of the year before the presidential election. Vacancies in the fiscal officership or on the board of trustees are filled by the remaining trustees.
