= Hamilton K. Wheeler =

American politician

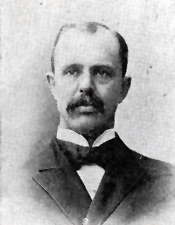

Member of the U.S. House of Representatives from Illinois's 9th district
- In office March 4, 1893 – March 3, 1895
- Preceded by: Herman W. Snow
- Succeeded by: Robert R. Hitt

Personal details
- Born: August 5, 1848 Ballston, New York, U.S.
- Died: July 19, 1918 (aged 69) Kankakee, Illinois, U.S.
- Party: Republican

Hamilton Kinkaid Wheeler (August 5, 1848 – July 19, 1918) was a U.S. representative from Illinois.

== Biography ==
Born in Ballston, New York, Wheeler moved to Illinois in 1852 with his parents, who settled near Grant Park, Kankakee County. He attended public and private schools in Kankakee County, and then studied law and gained admission to the bar in 1871, commencing practice in the city of Kankakee. He served as member of the Illinois State Senate in 1884.

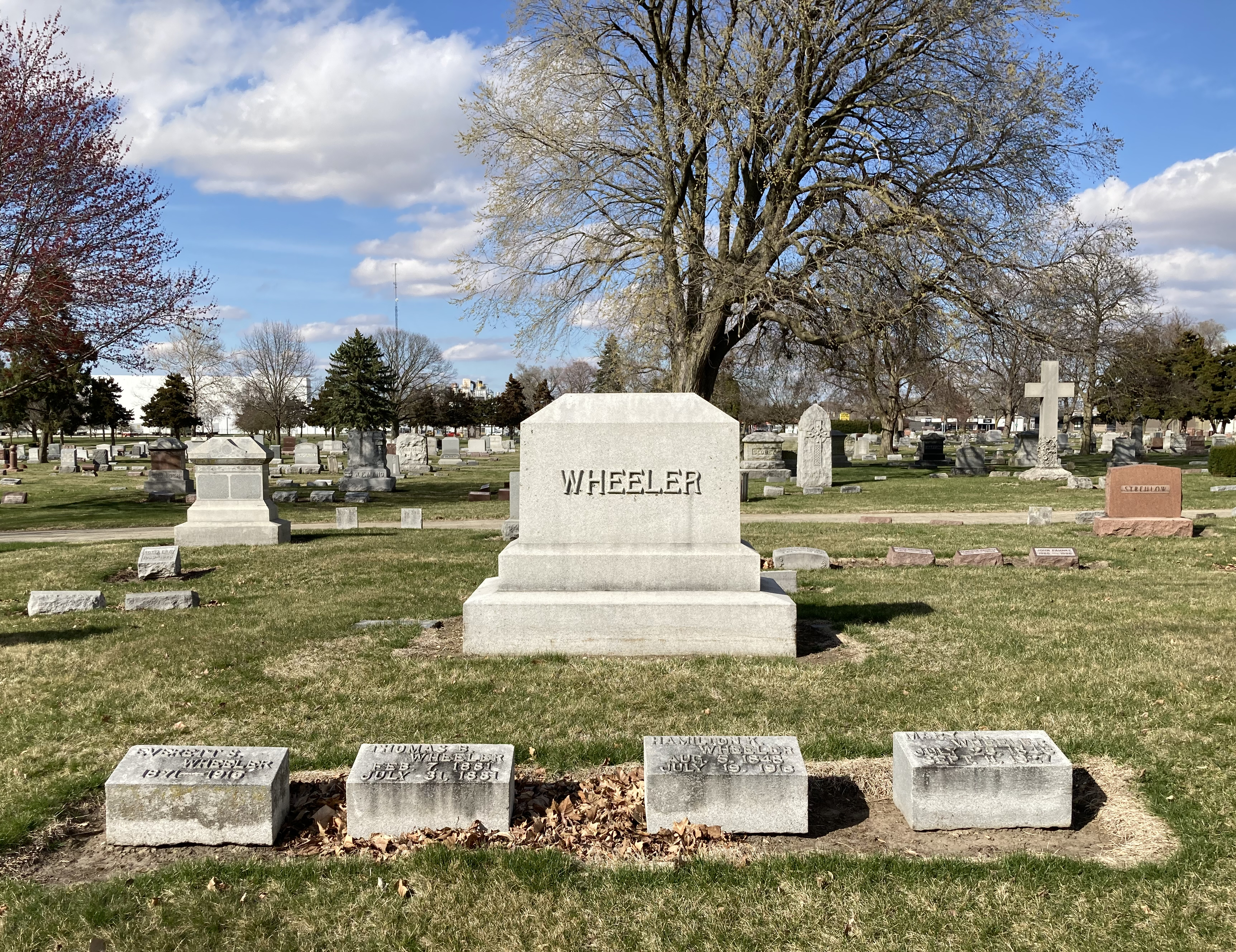
Wheeler's grave at Mound Grove Cemetery

Wheeler was elected as a Republican to the Fifty-third Congress (March 4, 1893 – March 3, 1895). He was not a candidate for renomination in 1894 to the Fifty-fourth Congress. He resumed practicing of law in Kankakee, Illinois, serving as delegate to the Republican National Conventions in 1896 and 1900.

He died in Kankakee, Illinois, July 19, 1918, and was interred in Mound Grove Cemetery.

U.S. House of Representatives
Preceded by Herman W. Snow	Member of the U.S. House of Representatives from Illinois's 9th congressional district 1893 – 1895	Succeeded by Robert R. Hitt
