= John H. Lewis =

American politician

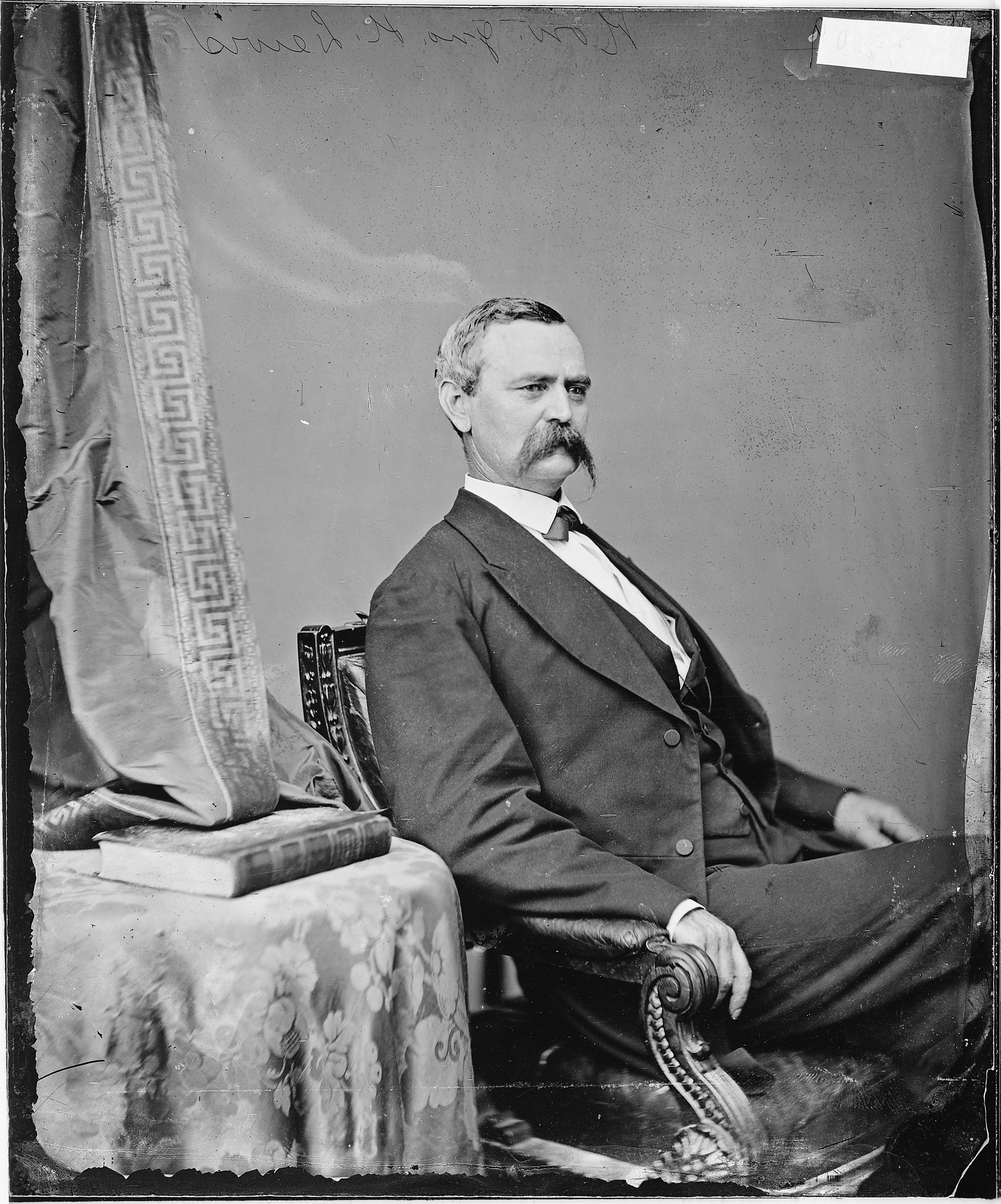

Member of the U.S. House of Representatives from Illinois's 9th district
- In office March 4, 1881 – March 3, 1883
- Preceded by: Thomas A. Boyd
- Succeeded by: Lewis E. Payson

Member of the Illinois House of Representatives
- In office 1874–1875

Personal details
- Born: July 21, 1830 Ithaca, New York
- Died: January 6, 1929 (aged 98) Knoxville, Illinois
- Party: Republican

John Henry Lewis (July 21, 1830 – January 6, 1929) was an American lawyer and politician who served as a U.S. representative for Illinois's 9th congressional district from 1881 to 1883.

== Early life ==
Born near Ithaca, New York, Lewis moved to Illinois in 1836 with his parents, who settled on a farm in Fulton County, Illinois, near Ellisville. He attended the rural schools.

== Career ==
Lewis moved to Knox County, Illinois, in 1847 and engaged in agricultural pursuits near Knoxville. He also studied law and was admitted to the bar in 1860. After practicing law in Knoxville, Illinois, he served as clerk of the circuit court of Knox County from 1860 to 1864. He also served as member of the Illinois House of Representatives in 1874 and 1875.

Lewis was elected as a Republican to the Forty-seventh Congress (March 4, 1881 – March 3, 1883). He was an unsuccessful candidate for reelection in 1882 to the Forty-eighth Congress. He resumed the practice of law before retiring in 1900.

== Personal life ==
Lewis died in Knoxville, Illinois, on January 6, 1929, at the age of 98. He was interred in Knoxville Cemetery.

U.S. House of Representatives
Preceded by Thomas A. Boyd	Member of the U.S. House of Representatives from Illinois's 9th congressional district 1881 – 1883	Succeeded by Lewis E. Payson
