= Bloom Township, Scioto County, Ohio =

Township in Ohio, US

- Township
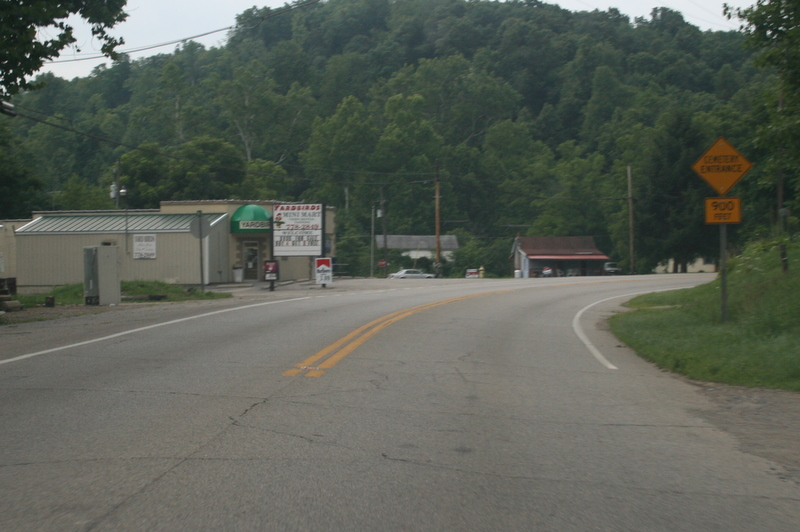
- Road scene in Scioto Furnace

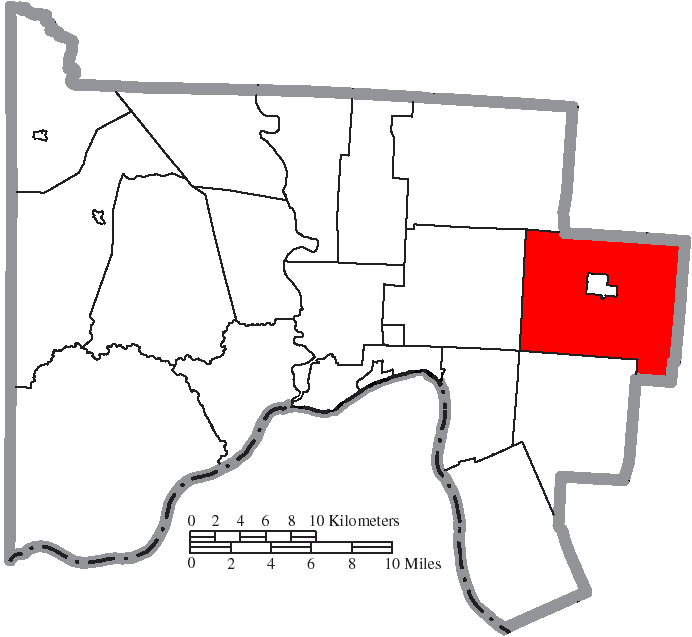
- Location of Bloom Township in Scioto County
- Coordinates: 38°48′40″N 82°43′17″W
- Country: United States
- State: Ohio
- County: Scioto

Area
  - Total: 48.7 sq mi (126.2 km^{2})
  - Land: 48.7 sq mi (126.1 km^{2})
  - Water: 0.039 sq mi (0.1 km^{2})
- Elevation: 810 ft (247 m)

Population (2020)
  - Total: 2,714
  - Density: 56/sq mi (21.5/km^{2})
- Time zone: UTC-5 (Eastern (EST))
  - Summer (DST): UTC-4 (EDT)
- FIPS code: 39-06992
- GNIS feature ID: 1086922

Bloom Township is one of the sixteen townships of Scioto County, Ohio, United States. The population at the 2020 census was 2,714.

== Geography ==
Located in the far east of the county, it borders the following townships:

- Hamilton Township, Jackson County - north
- Jefferson Township, Jackson County - northeast
- Washington Township, Lawrence County - east
- Decatur Township, Lawrence County - southeast
- Vernon Township - south
- Porter Township - southwest corner
- Harrison Township - west
- Madison Township - northwest

The village of South Webster is located in the center of the township, and the unincorporated community of Scioto Furnace lies in the township's west.

== Name and history ==
Statewide, other Bloom Townships are located in Fairfield, Morgan, Seneca, and Wood counties.

Bloom Township was organized on August 25, 1812. The township was named for a bloomery within its borders. By the 1830s, other industries included three stores, one tavern and two tan yards.

== Government ==
The township is governed by a three-member board of trustees, who are elected in November of odd-numbered years to a four-year term beginning on the following January 1. Two are elected in the year after the presidential election and one is elected in the year before it. There is also an elected township fiscal officer, who serves a four-year term beginning on April 1 of the year after the election, which is held in November of the year before the presidential election. Vacancies in the fiscal officership or on the board of trustees are filled by the remaining trustees.

== Notable people ==
- Edward Oscar McCowen, Republican member of the U.S. House of Representatives.
