= Porter Township, Scioto County, Ohio =

Township in Ohio, US

- Township
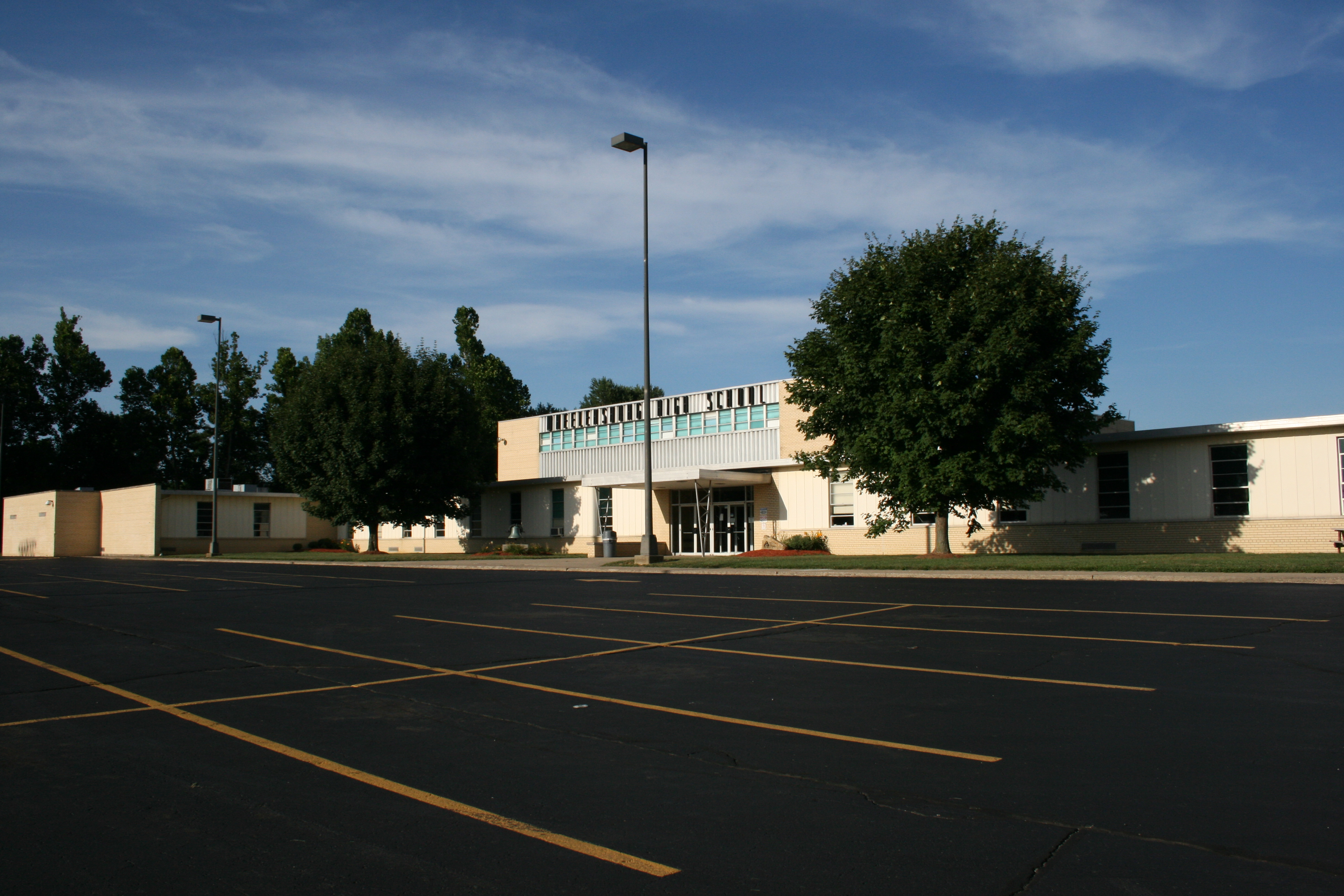
- Wheelersburg High School

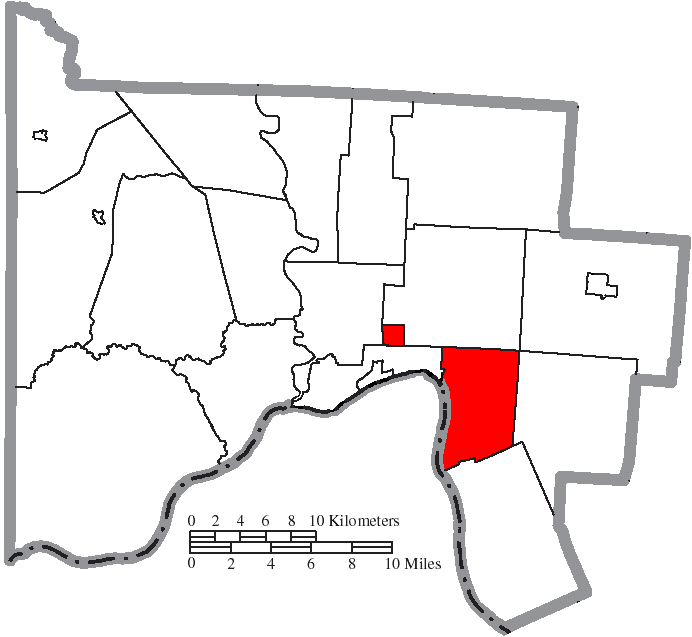
- Location of Porter Township in Scioto County
- Coordinates: 38°43′50″N 82°50′42″W
- Country: United States
- State: Ohio
- County: Scioto

Area
  - Total: 21.2 sq mi (54.8 km^{2})
  - Land: 21.0 sq mi (54.4 km^{2})
  - Water: 0.15 sq mi (0.4 km^{2})
- Elevation: 659 ft (201 m)

Population (2020)
  - Total: 9,876
  - Density: 470/sq mi (181.5/km^{2})
- Time zone: UTC-5 (Eastern (EST))
  - Summer (DST): UTC-4 (EDT)
- FIPS code: 39-64206
- GNIS feature ID: 1086932

Porter Township is one of the sixteen townships of Scioto County, Ohio, United States. The population as of the 2020 census was 9,876.

== Geography ==
Located in the southern part of the county along the Ohio River, it borders the following townships:

- Harrison Township - north
- Bloom Township - northeast corner
- Vernon Township - east
- Green Township - south
- Clay Township - northwest

Greenup County, Kentucky lies across the Ohio River to the southwest.

No municipalities are located in Porter Township, although the city of Portsmouth (the county seat of Scioto County) and the village of New Boston have incorporated much of the western part of the township. The census-designated places of Sciotodale and Wheelersburg lie in the northern and central parts of the township.

Annexation by Portsmouth has caused Porter Township to exist in two parts: a large section in the east, and a small section in the northwest.

== Name and history ==
Statewide, the only other Porter Township is located in Delaware County.

Porter Township has the distinction of being one of the earliest settled, dating to February 1796. It was organized by Samuel Marshall on December 16, 1814. The township was named after Porter Wheeler, an early settler.

In 1833, Porter Township contained 21 forges for iron, three gristmills, three saw mills, one fulling mill, and one oil mill.

== Government ==
The township is governed by a three-member board of trustees, who are elected in November of odd-numbered years to a four-year term beginning on the following January 1. Two are elected in the year after the presidential election and one is elected in the year before it. There is also an elected township fiscal officer, who serves a four-year term beginning on April 1 of the year after the election, which is held in November of the year before the presidential election. Vacancies in the fiscal officership or on the board of trustees are filled by the remaining trustees.

== Public services ==
Porter Township residents are served by the Portsmouth Public Library-Wheelersburg Branch, the Wheelersburg Local School District, and by a full-time as well as a volunteer fire department. While most children in the township attend the Wheelersburg Local School District, part of the township lies within the Portsmouth City School system.
