= 151st Illinois Infantry Regiment =

151st Regiment Illinois Volunteer Infantry
- Illinois state flag
- Active: February 23, 1865, to February 8, 1866
- Country: United States
- Allegiance: Union
- Branch: Union Army
- Role: Infantry

The 151st Regiment Illinois Volunteer Infantry was an infantry regiment that served in the Union Army during the American Civil War.

== Service ==
The 151st Illinois Infantry was organized at Quincy, Illinois, and mustered into Federal service on February 23, 1865, for a one-year enlistment. Just two days after they were mustered, they moved to Springfield, Illinois, where their field officers and staff were mustered, and where they also received their arms.

The regiment later moved to Dalton, Georgia, and from there, they were engaged in drilling, picket, guard, and scouting duties.

On April 23, Colonel Woodall, under a flag of truce, moved to Macon, Georgia, to carry terms of surrender to General Wofford and his command. And on May 2, the regiment moved to Kingston, Georgia, to receive the surrender of Wofford and his 10,400 rebels, which was completed on May 15.

Colonel Woodall was left in command at Kingston; meanwhile, Companies D and F were detached from the regiment, with Company D being sent to conduct garrison duty at Adairsville, and Company F being sent to Rome for garrison duty, while Lieutenant Colonel Snow was left in command of the regiment.

On July 24, Lieutenant Colonel Snow, along with three companies, moved to Carterville; meanwhile, Major Battey was sent to Rome to relieve Captain Hair of Company F,

On July 31, the regiment moved to Columbus, Georgia, and conducted duty there until January 1866.

The regiment mustered out on February 8, 1866.

== Total strength and casualties ==
The regiment had 51 enlisted men who died of disease.

== Commanders ==
- Colonel French B. Woodall - mustered out with the regiment.

== See also ==
- List of Illinois Civil War Units
- Illinois in the American Civil War
