= Charles N. Barnes =

American politician

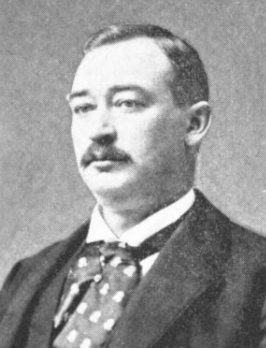
- Born: March 25, 1860; Marshall County, Illinois, US
- Died: February 4, 1932 (aged 71); Peoria, Illinois, US
- Education: University of Iowa; University of Chicago Law School
- Occupations: Lawyer, politician
- Political party: Democratic

Charles N. Barnes (March 25, 1860 – February 4, 1932) was an American lawyer and politician.

== Biography ==
Barnes was born in Marshall County, Illinois on March 25, 1860. He went to Washburn High School. Barnes went to University of Iowa and University of Chicago Law School. Barnes was admitted to the Illinois bar in 1884. He served as manager of the Springer Land Irrigation Company in New Mexico for a brief time. Barnes lived in Lacon, Illinois. He served as the state's attorney for Marshall County. He also served on the Marshall County Board and was a Democrat. Marshall served in the Illinois Senate for 1893 to 1897. Barnes died at his home in Peoria, Illinois.
