= Lacon, Illinois =

- City
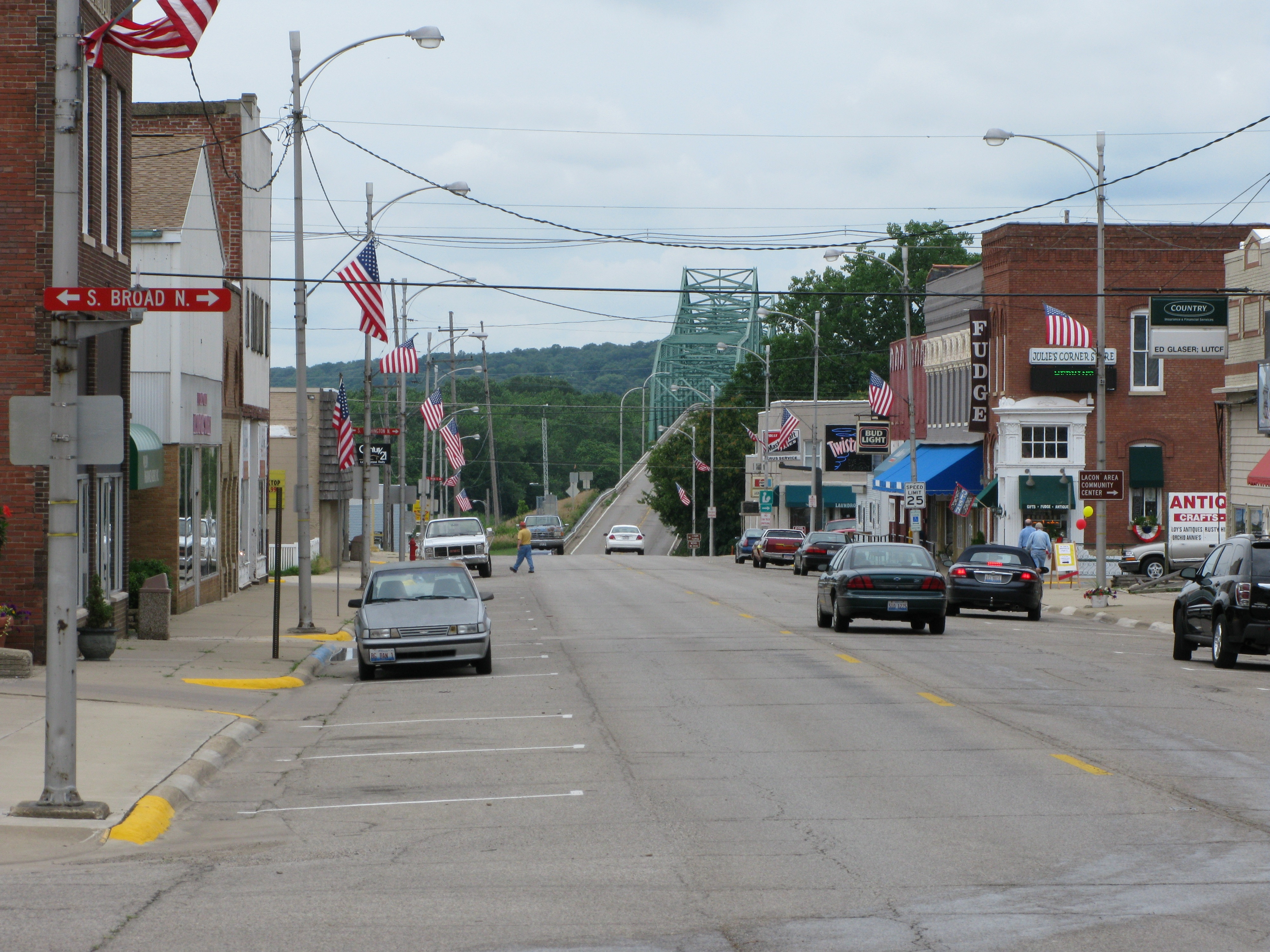
- 5th Street, Lacon, view towards the Illinois River
- Interactive map of Lacon, Illinois
- Location within Illinois Location within the United States
- Coordinates: 41°1′26″N 89°24′28″W
- Country: United States
- State: Illinois
- County: Marshall
- Township: Lacon
- Founded: 1831 as Strawn's Landing
- Renamed: 1831 as Columbia
- Renamed: 1837 as Lacon
- Named for: Laconia

Area
  - Total: 1.64 sq mi (4.25 km^{2})
  - Land: 1.60 sq mi (4.14 km^{2})
  - Water: 0.042 sq mi (0.11 km^{2})
- Elevation: 505 ft (154 m)

Population (2020)
  - Total: 1,878
  - Estimate (2024): 1,838
  - Density: 1,173.6/sq mi (453.14/km^{2})
- Time zone: UTC-6 (CST)
  - Summer (DST): UTC-5 (CDT)
- ZIP code: 61540
- Area code: 309
- FIPS code: 17-40559
- GNIS feature ID: 2395578
- Website: laconcity.com

Lacon is a city in and the county seat of Marshall County, Illinois, United States. It is part of the Peoria metropolitan area. The population was 1,878 at the 2020 census, down from 1,937 in 2010.

== History ==
Lacon was named after Laconia, a region of Greece. Lacon was established in 1831 and is the oldest town in Marshall, Putnam, Bureau, and Stark Counties. On August 6, 1831, it was laid out as the town of Columbia. The town grew in population after the Black Hawk War.

A Temperance Society was formed July 28, 1836. A Presbyterian Church organized in 1837. A post-office was established in 1837. A newspaper called The Lacon Herald published in December 1837. The name changed from Columbia to Lacon on January 19, 1837. The town expanded with a purchase of an addition on July 3, 1837.

The Marshall County Courthouse was built in 1840 and a county jail in 1844. On June 27, 1842, President Martin Van Buren paid a brief visit to the town.

Lacon was the site of the lynching of F. W. Stewart in 1898.

The community of Lacon, Alabama, now a ghost town, was named after Lacon. All that remains of Lacon, Alabama is a flea market.

== Geography ==
Lacon is located in central Marshall County on the east shoreline of the Illinois River.

Illinois Route 17 passes through the city center as Ferry Street, leading west across the Illinois River on the Lacon Bridge into Sparland. Route 17 leads east 20 miles (32 km) to Wenona and west 21 miles (34 km) to Wyoming. Illinois Route 26 also runs through the center of Lacon, following Prairie Street. It leads northeast up the Illinois River valley 19 miles (31 km) to Hennepin and south along the river 28 miles (45 km) to East Peoria.

According to the U.S. Census Bureau, Lacon has a total area of 1.641 square miles (4.25 km^{2}), of which 1.6 square miles (4.14 km^{2}) are land and 0.041 square miles (0.11 km^{2}), or 2.5%, are water.

=== Climate ===
Climate data for Lacon, Illinois (1991–2020)
Month	Jan	Feb	Mar	Apr	May	Jun	Jul	Aug	Sep	Oct	Nov	Dec	Year
Mean daily maximum °F (°C)	33.8 (1.0)	38.3 (3.5)	51.4 (10.8)	64.5 (18.1)	75.0 (23.9)	84.4 (29.1)	87.0 (30.6)	85.6 (29.8)	79.6 (26.4)	66.6 (19.2)	51.2 (10.7)	38.3 (3.5)	63.0 (17.2)
Daily mean °F (°C)	25.9 (−3.4)	29.9 (−1.2)	41.4 (5.2)	52.9 (11.6)	63.3 (17.4)	72.8 (22.7)	76.0 (24.4)	74.3 (23.5)	67.4 (19.7)	55.0 (12.8)	41.9 (5.5)	30.8 (−0.7)	52.6 (11.5)
Mean daily minimum °F (°C)	18.0 (−7.8)	21.5 (−5.8)	31.3 (−0.4)	41.4 (5.2)	51.7 (10.9)	61.2 (16.2)	65.1 (18.4)	63.0 (17.2)	55.1 (12.8)	43.5 (6.4)	32.6 (0.3)	23.2 (−4.9)	42.3 (5.7)
Average precipitation inches (mm)	2.07 (53)	2.06 (52)	2.65 (67)	4.00 (102)	4.76 (121)	4.29 (109)	3.97 (101)	3.33 (85)	3.30 (84)	3.16 (80)	2.63 (67)	2.17 (55)	38.39 (976)
Average snowfall inches (cm)	8.1 (21)	6.2 (16)	3.2 (8.1)	0.7 (1.8)	0.0 (0.0)	0.0 (0.0)	0.0 (0.0)	0.0 (0.0)	0.0 (0.0)	0.1 (0.25)	1.1 (2.8)	5.2 (13)	24.6 (62.95)
Source: NOAA

== Demographics ==
Historical population
Census	Pop.	Note	%±
1850	963		—
1870	2,105		—
1880	1,814		−13.8%
1890	1,649		−9.1%
1900	1,601		−2.9%
1910	1,495		−6.6%
1920	1,464		−2.1%
1930	1,548		5.7%
1940	1,627		5.1%
1950	2,020		24.2%
1960	2,175		7.7%
1970	2,147		−1.3%
1980	2,135		−0.6%
1990	1,986		−7.0%
2000	1,979		−0.4%
2010	1,937		−2.1%
2020	1,878		−3.0%
U.S. Decennial Census

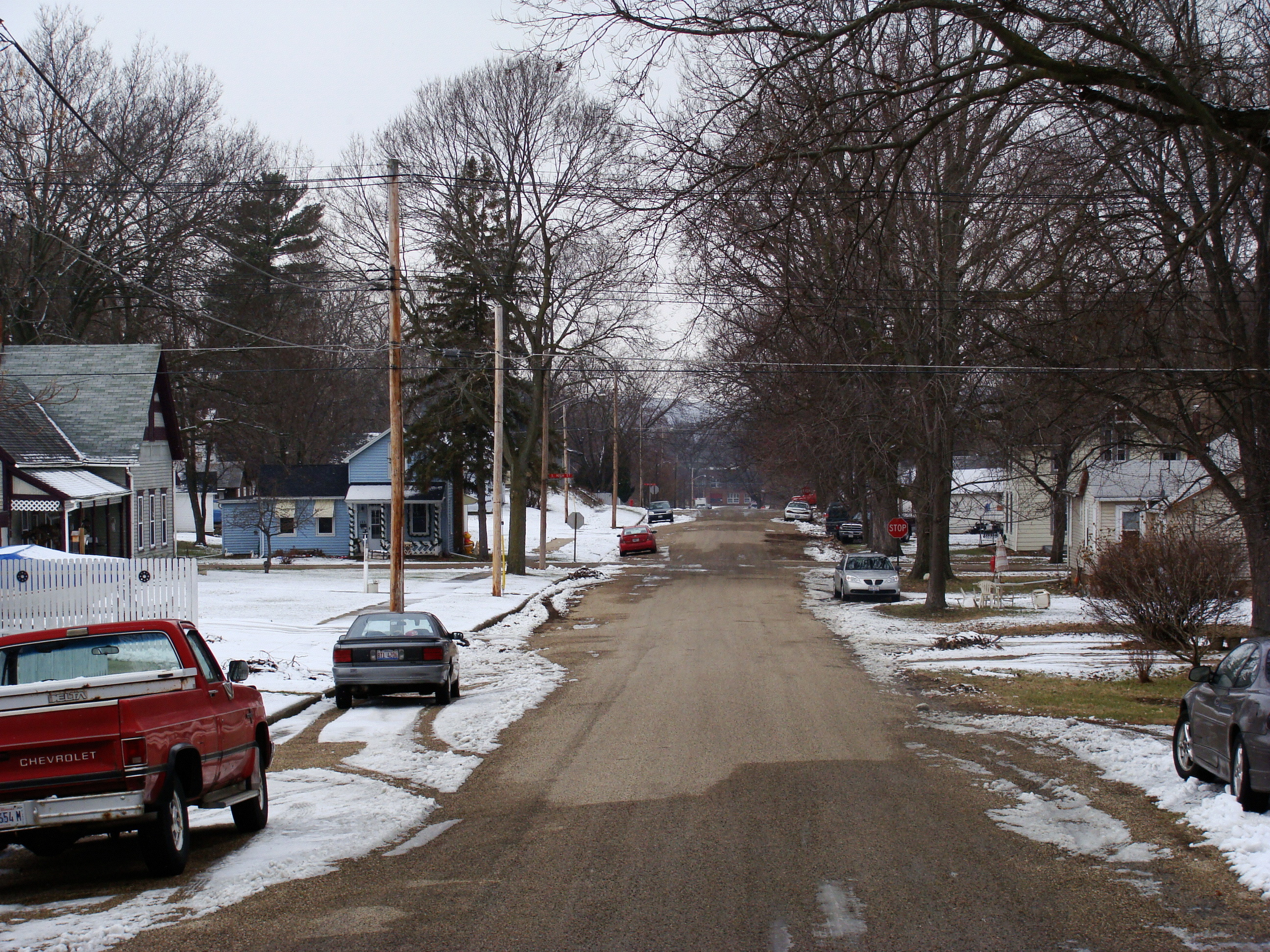
Residential street in winter

=== 2020 census ===
As of the 2020 census, Lacon had a population of 1,878. The median age was 44.3 years. 20.6% of residents were under the age of 18 and 24.4% of residents were 65 years of age or older. For every 100 females there were 90.7 males, and for every 100 females age 18 and over there were 88.7 males age 18 and over.

0.0% of residents lived in urban areas, while 100.0% lived in rural areas.

There were 801 households in Lacon, of which 26.1% had children under the age of 18 living in them. Of all households, 40.6% were married-couple households, 19.6% were households with a male householder and no spouse or partner present, and 29.5% were households with a female householder and no spouse or partner present. About 36.0% of all households were made up of individuals and 17.0% had someone living alone who was 65 years of age or older.

There were 901 housing units, of which 11.1% were vacant. The homeowner vacancy rate was 2.7% and the rental vacancy rate was 5.7%.

Racial composition as of the 2020 census
Race	Number	Percent
White	1,779	94.7%
Black or African American	13	0.7%
American Indian and Alaska Native	3	0.2%
Asian	3	0.2%
Native Hawaiian and Other Pacific Islander	0	0.0%
Some other race	2	0.1%
Two or more races	78	4.2%
Hispanic or Latino (of any race)	31	1.7%

=== 2000 census ===
As of the 2000 census, there were 1,979 people, 797 households, and 540 families residing in the city. The population density was 1,233.9 inhabitants per square mile (476.4/km^{2}). There were 852 housing units at an average density of 531.2 per square mile (205.1/km^{2}). The racial makeup of the city was 80.09% White, 7.10% African American, 0.10% Native American, 0.20% Asian, 0.10% from other races, and 0.40% from two or more races. Hispanic or Latino of any race were 12.91% of the population.

There were 797 households, out of which 28.1% had children under the age of 18 living with them, 55.6% were married couples living together, 7.9% had a female householder with no husband present, and 32.2% were non-families. 28.6% of all households were made up of individuals, and 15.4% had someone living alone who was 65 years of age or older. The average household size was 2.35 and the average family size was 2.87.

In the city, the population was spread out, with 21.7% under the age of 18, 7.0% from 18 to 24, 25.4% from 25 to 44, 21.9% from 45 to 64, and 24.1% who were 65 years of age or older. The median age was 42 years. For every 100 females, there were 88.8 males. For every 100 females age 18 and over, there were 83.6 males.

The median income for a household in the city was $40,203, and the median income for a family was $47,670. Males had a median income of $36,250 versus $20,694 for females. The per capita income for the city was $18,309. About 3.6% of families and 5.0% of the population were below the poverty line, including 6.2% of those under age 18 and 5.2% of those age 65 or over.

== Notable people ==
- Charles N. Barnes, Illinois politician and lawyer
- Robert Boal, Illinois politician
- Lucy Page Gaston, anti-tobacco crusader
- Valerie Allen Marland, First Lady of West Virginia (1953–1957)
- Michael P. McCuskey (born 1948), United States district judge of Illinois.
- Robert V. McGarvey, U.S. National Champion racehorse trainer
- Nellie Bangs Skelton, composer and pianist
- Robert Sproull, educator and physicist

== Gallery ==
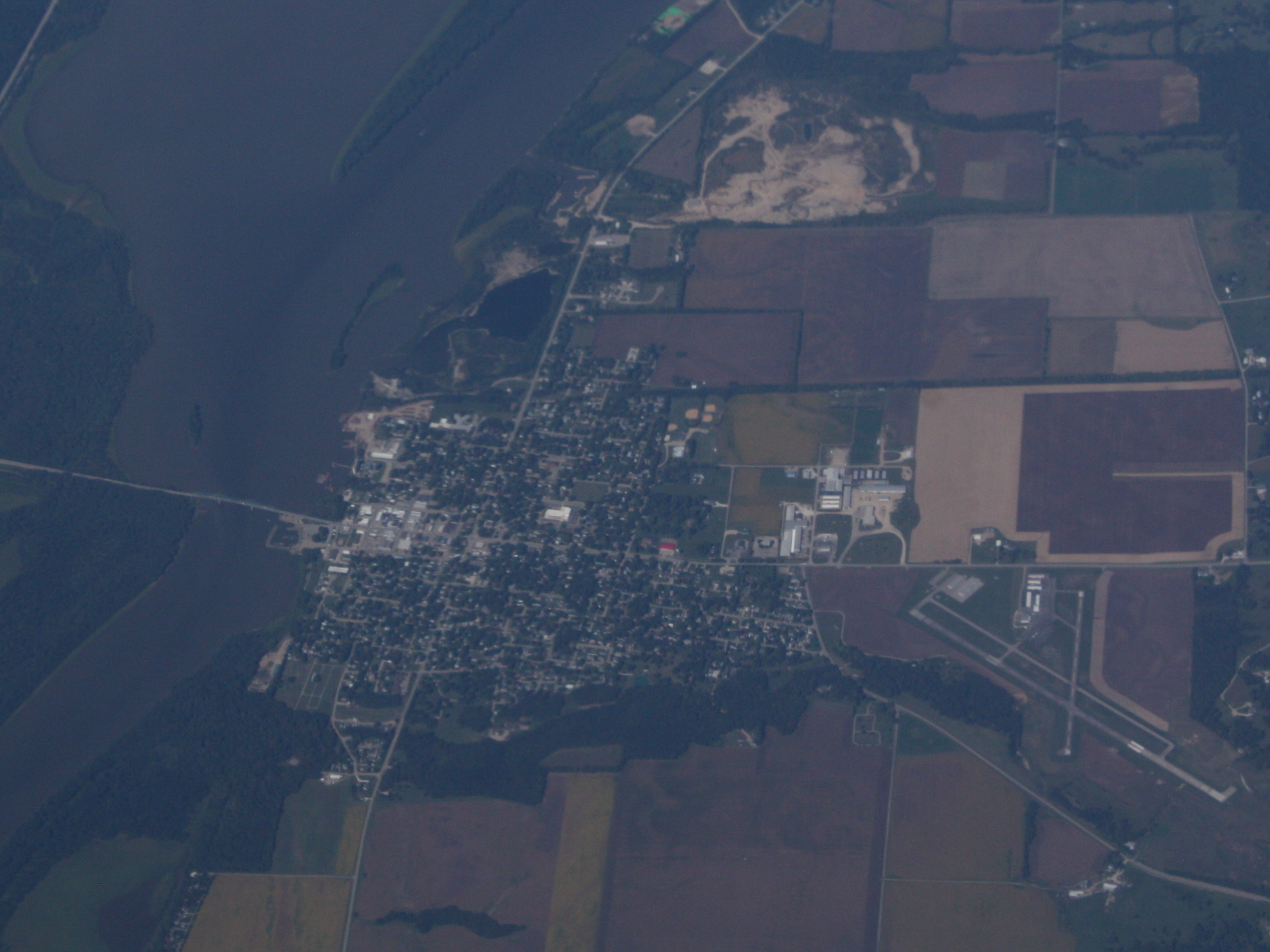
Lacon in September 2018

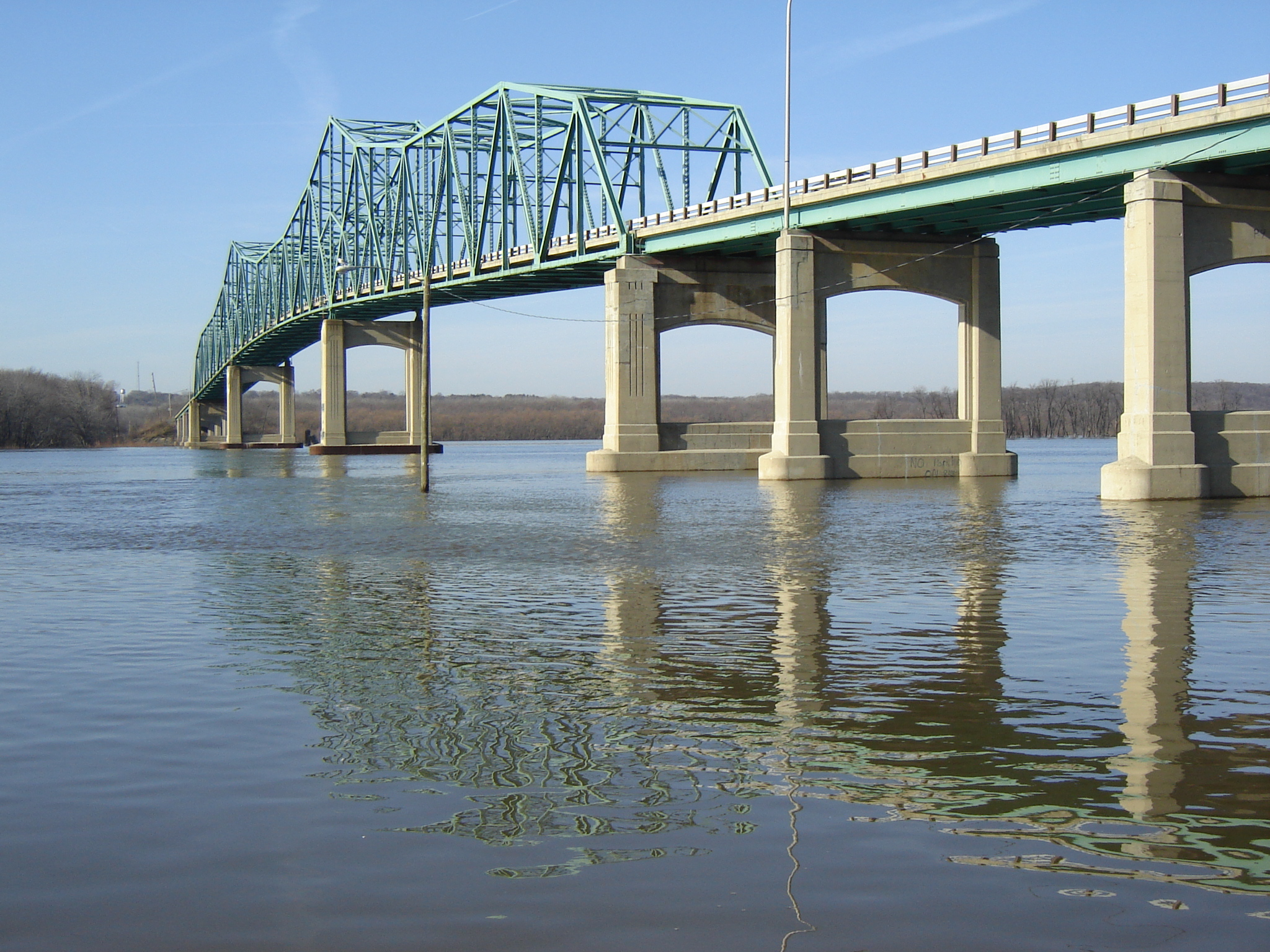
The Lacon Bridge across the Illinois River, technically a continuous truss bridge
