= Vernon Township =

Vernon Township may refer to:

== Illinois ==
- Vernon Township, Lake County, Illinois

== Indiana ==
- Vernon Township, Hancock County, Indiana
- Vernon Township, Jackson County, Indiana
- Vernon Township, Jennings County, Indiana
- Vernon Township, Washington County, Indiana

== Iowa ==
- Vernon Township, Dubuque County, Iowa, in Dubuque County, Iowa
- Vernon Township, Humboldt County, Iowa
- Vernon Township, Palo Alto County, Iowa
- Vernon Township, Van Buren County, Iowa
- Vernon Township, Wright County, Iowa

== Kansas ==
- Vernon Township, Cowley County, Kansas

== Michigan ==
- Vernon Township, Isabella County, Michigan
- Vernon Township, Shiawassee County, Michigan

== Minnesota ==
- Vernon Township, Dodge County, Minnesota

== Missouri ==
- Vernon Township, Clark County, Missouri

== New Jersey ==
- Vernon Township, New Jersey

== North Dakota ==
- Vernon Township, Kidder County, North Dakota, in Kidder County, North Dakota
- Vernon Township, Walsh County, North Dakota

== Ohio ==
- Vernon Township, Clinton County, Ohio
- Vernon Township, Crawford County, Ohio
- Vernon Township, Scioto County, Ohio
- Vernon Township, Trumbull County, Ohio

== Oklahoma ==
- Vernon Township, Kay County, Oklahoma

== Pennsylvania ==
- Vernon Township, Pennsylvania

== South Dakota ==
- Vernon Township, Beadle County, South Dakota, in Beadle County, South Dakota
- Vernon Township, Grant County, South Dakota, in Grant County, South Dakota

== See also ==
- Vernon (disambiguation)
