= Vernon Township, Scioto County, Ohio =

Township in Ohio, US

- Township
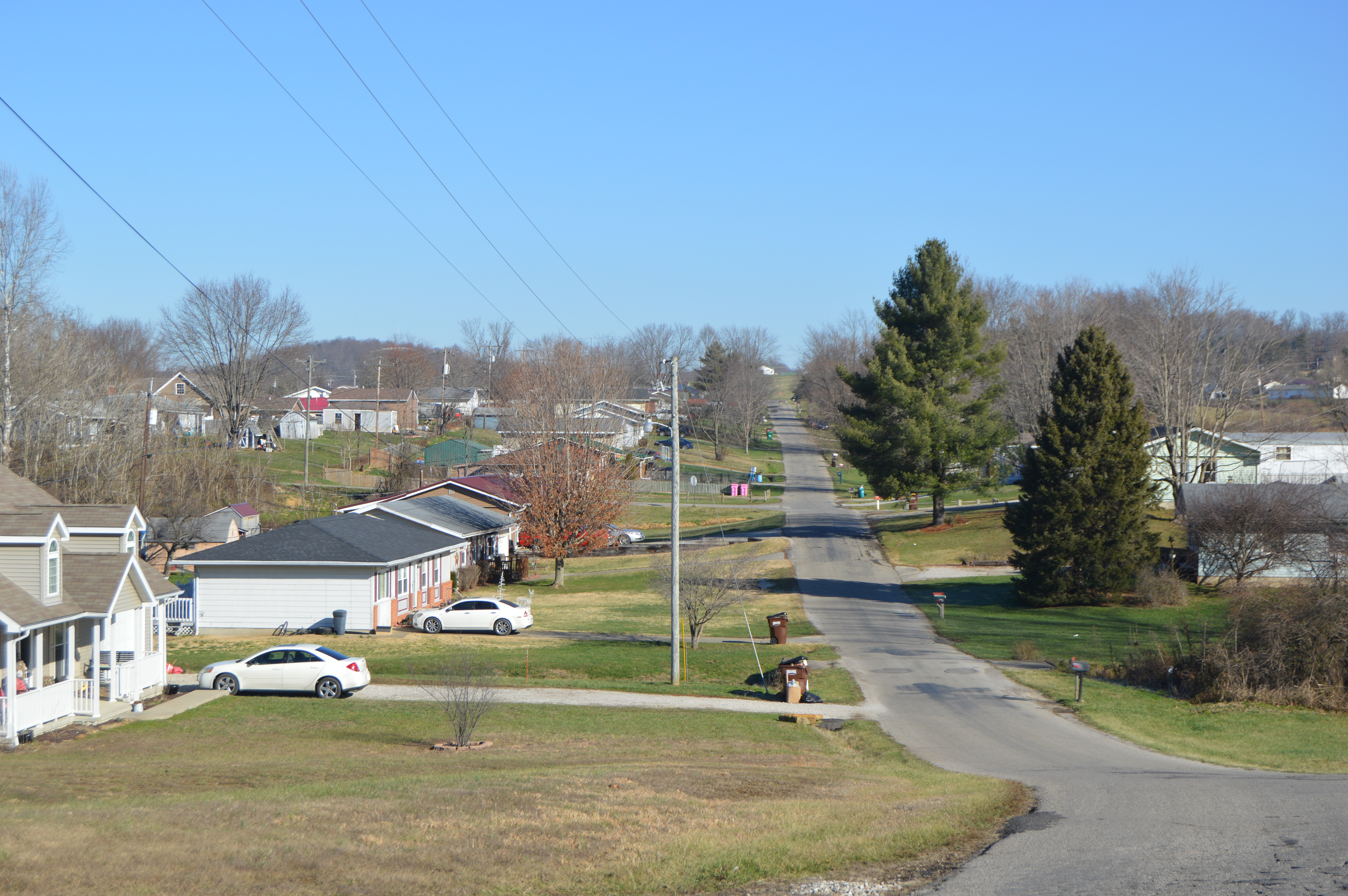
- Houses on Kittle Road near Ashley Corner

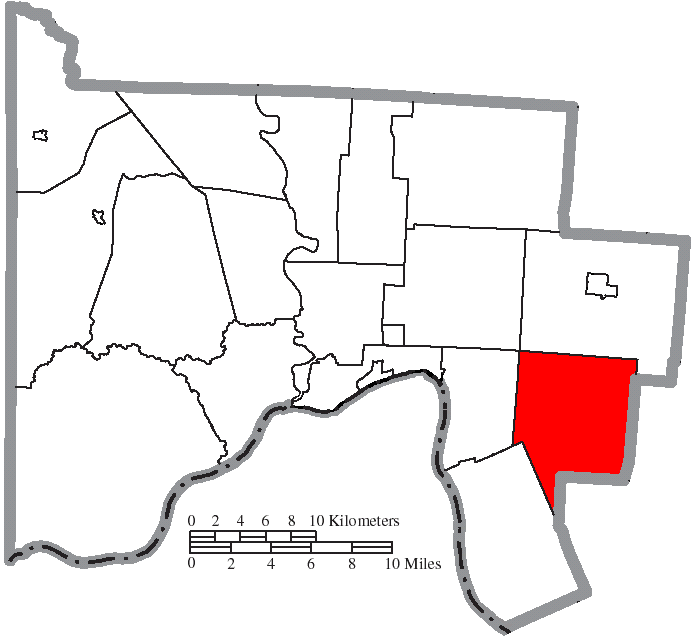
- Location of Vernon Township in Scioto County
- Coordinates: 38°44′2″N 82°45′50″W
- Country: United States
- State: Ohio
- County: Scioto

Area
  - Total: 35.3 sq mi (91.5 km^{2})
  - Land: 35.3 sq mi (91.5 km^{2})
  - Water: 0 sq mi (0.0 km^{2})
- Elevation: 614 ft (187 m)

Population (2020)
  - Total: 1,891
  - Density: 53.5/sq mi (20.7/km^{2})
- Time zone: UTC-5 (Eastern (EST))
  - Summer (DST): UTC-4 (EDT)
- FIPS code: 39-79828
- GNIS feature ID: 1086938
- Website: https://www.scvernontwp.com/

Vernon Township is one of the sixteen townships of Scioto County, Ohio, United States. The 2020 census counted 1,891 people in the township.

== Geography ==
Located in the southeastern part of the county, it borders the following townships:

- Bloom Township - north
- Decatur Township, Lawrence County - east
- Elizabeth Township, Lawrence County - southeast
- Green Township - southwest
- Porter Township - west
- Harrison Township - northwest corner

No municipalities are located in Vernon Township.

== Name and history ==
Statewide, other Vernon Townships are located in Clinton, Crawford, and Trumbull counties.

Vernon Township was organized in 1818. The township derives its name from Mount Vernon, the estate of George Washington.

In 1833, Vernon Township contained a blast steam furnace for melting ore, one gristmill and one saw mill, three stores, and a tanyard.

== Government ==
The township is governed by a three-member board of trustees, who are elected in November of odd-numbered years to a four-year term beginning on the following January 1. Two are elected in the year after the presidential election and one is elected in the year before it. There is also an elected township fiscal officer, who serves a four-year term beginning on April 1 of the year after the election, which is held in November of the year before the presidential election. Vacancies in the fiscal officership or on the board of trustees are filled by the remaining trustees.
