= Scioto Company =

American land speculation company

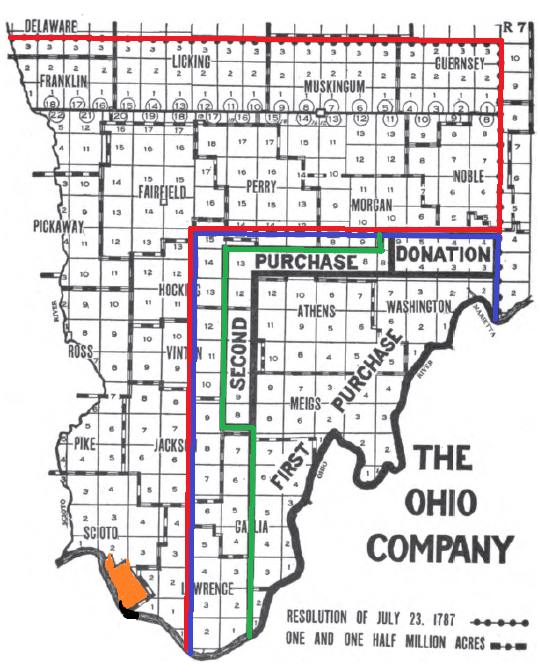
The proposed purchase by the Scioto Company is shown in red. The proposed purchase by the Ohio Company is in blue. The final purchase by the Ohio Company is in green. The French Grant is orange.

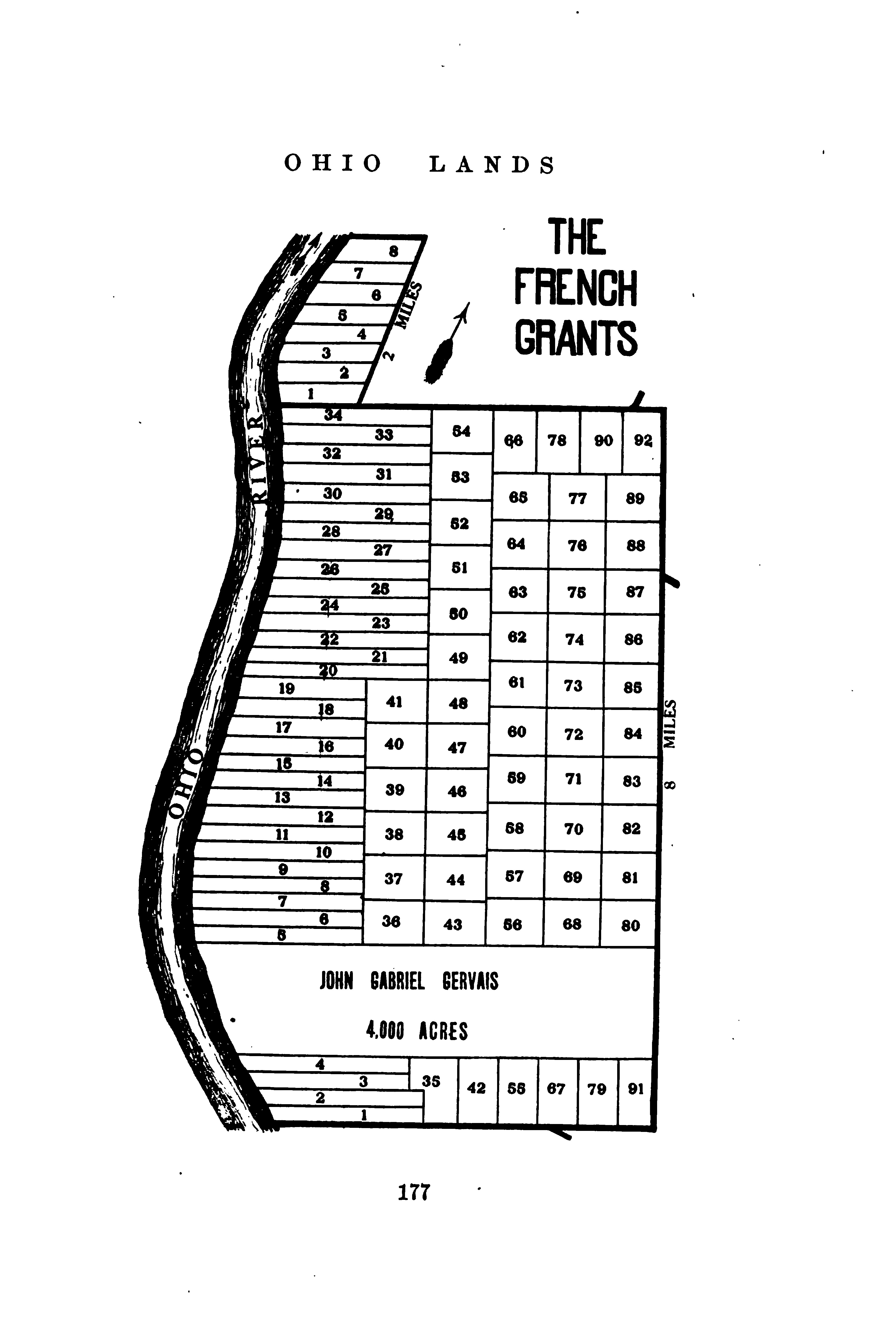
Shape and subdivision of the French Grant

The Scioto Company was a company led by American colonel William Duer, a land speculator, that swindled prospective settlers to the United States by selling worthless deeds of land.

Duer worked with a British colleague and several French men to register and organize the company in Paris, France. Ostensibly working with the Ohio Company to purchase land in the Northwest Territory, agents of this institution sold worthless deeds to French people intending to emigrate to the United States. Many were refugees from the excesses of the French Revolution, and the émigrés were made up of minor aristocrats, merchants, artisans and craftsmen. The Scioto Company did not own the land it was selling.

== History ==
The Scioto Land Company was founded by American speculator Colonel William Duer and others in 1787 after the Northwest Territory was organized. It was officially established in 1789 as the Compagnie du Scioto in Paris by American Joel Barlow; William Playfair, a Scot who was the agent of Duer and his associates abroad; plus six Frenchmen.

This company had arranged in 1787 with the Ohio Company, for the use of about 4,000,000 acres (16,000 km^{2}) (another source says about 3,500,000 acres (14,000 km^{2})), north of the Ohio River and east of the Scioto River, on which the Ohio Company had secured an option. The dishonesty of those who conducted the sales in France, the shady methods of Barlow, and the failure of Duer and his associates to meet their contract with the Ohio Company, caused the collapse of the Scioto Company early in 1790. Two subsequent attempts to revive it failed.

Meanwhile, about 150,000 acres (610 km^{2}) had been purportedly "sold" to prospective settlers, companies and individuals in France. On February 19, 1791, 218 of these purchasers left Havre de Grace, in France, and arrived on May 3 in Alexandria, District of Columbia (now Alexandria, Virginia).

They were among a group known as the French 500, many of whom were fleeing the disruption of the French Revolution. On their arrival, they were told that the Scioto Company owned no land. When they reached Marietta, Ohio, along the Ohio River, about fifty of them landed. In October 1791, the rest of the company proceeded to Gallipolis, which was laid out about that time. It is now within Gallia County, Ohio. The developer had built rude huts for the group, who were mostly urban residents with few skills to survive on the undeveloped frontier. The agent assured them that this site was within the boundary of their purchase. This land, however, fell within the limits of the tract bought outright by the Ohio Company. It had sold it to the Scioto Company, but reclaimed it after Scioto Company failed to complete its payments.

In 1794, William Bradford, the U.S. Attorney General, decided that all rights in the 4,000,000 acres (16,000 km^{2}) on which the Ohio Company had secured an option for the Scioto Company were legally vested in the Ohio Company. In 1795, the Ohio Company sold to the French settlers for $1.25 an acre ($309/km^{2}) the land they occupied and adjacent improved lots. They effectively had to pay twice for their land.

Learning of their plight, in 1795 the United States government granted the French some 24,000 acres (97 km^{2}) in the southern part of what is now Scioto County, Ohio, with lengthy frontage on the Ohio River. This is known as the First French Grant. Some of the company moved to that area, but most remained in Gallipolis, committed to the land they had started to develop. Four thousand acres of the French Grant were reserved for John Gabriel Gervais, and 20,000 acres were to be divided among the remaining inhabitants of Gallipolis.

Eight inhabitants of Gallipolis somehow missed out on the 1795 distribution. In 1798 Congress made an additional adjacent grant, the Second Grant, of 1,200 acres (4.9 km^{2}) for these eight. With their lives having been started in Gallipolis, most of the French residents never occupied either of the grants; they either sold their allotted land or sent tenant farmers to occupy their plots.
