= French Grant =

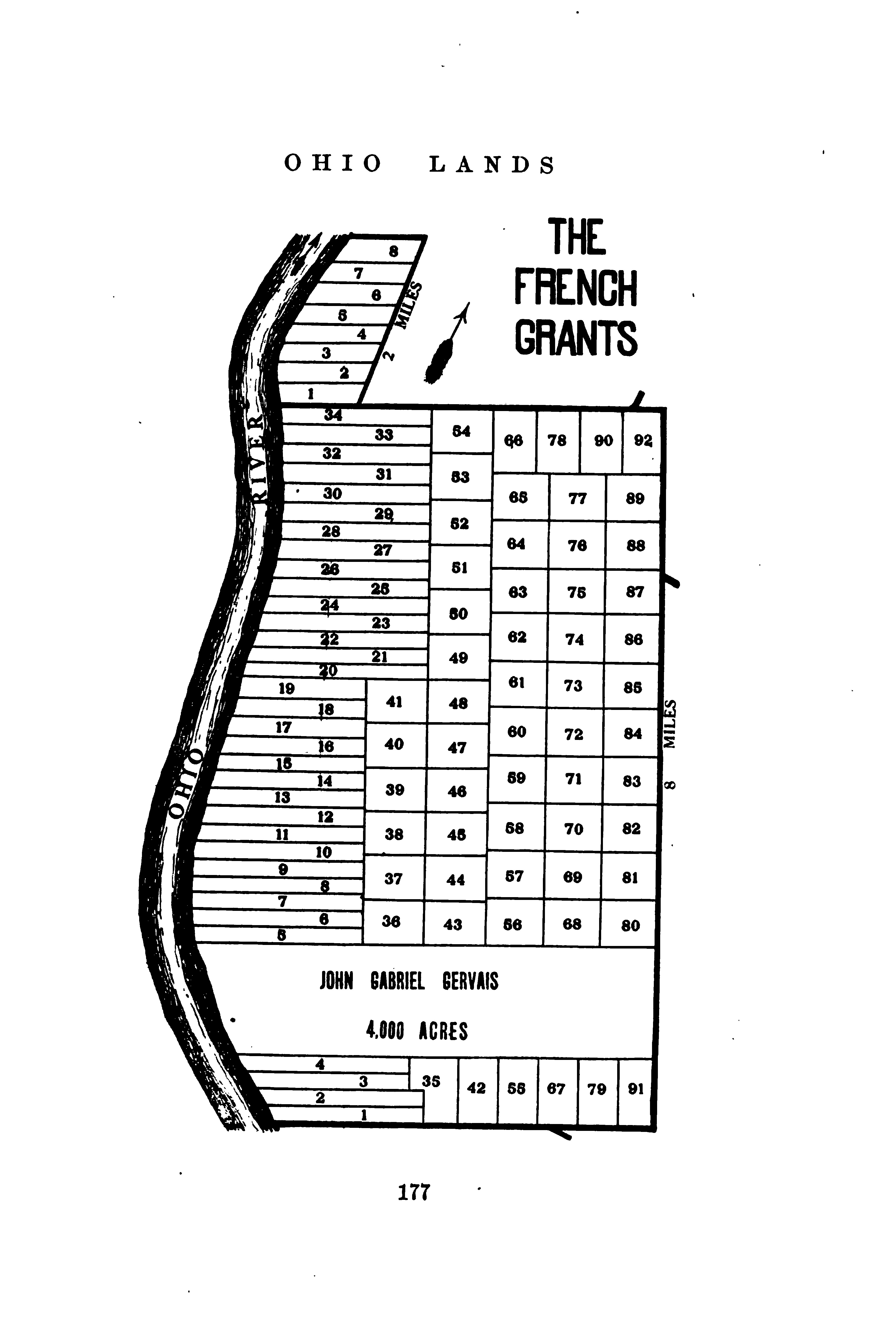
Shape and subdivision of the French Grant

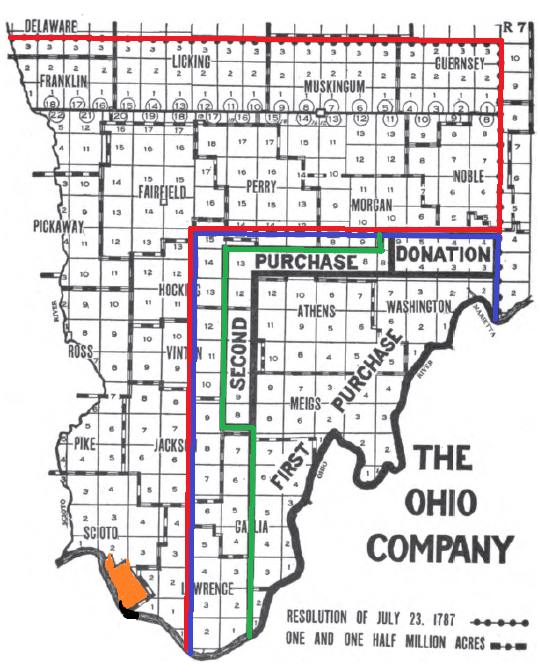
The proposed purchase by the Scioto Company is shown in red. The proposed purchase by the Ohio Company is in blue. The final purchase by the Ohio Company is in green. The French Grant is orange.

The French Grant (also known as the French-Grant Estates) was a land tract in the Northwest Territory, present day Scioto County, Ohio, that was paid out by the U.S. Congress on March 31, 1795. This was after a group of French colonists were defrauded by the Scioto Company of purchased land grants which rightly were controlled by the Ohio Company of Associates. Not all of the settlers took the grant, some preferring to stay on the East Coast, others choosing Gallipolis in Gallia County, Ohio. (Gallia and Gallipolis were named for Gaul, the ancient Roman province roughly equivalent to France.)

The First Grant extended from a point on the Ohio River 1.5 miles (2.4 km) above and opposite the mouth of Little Sandy River (Kentucky) in Kentucky, and extending eight miles (13 km) in a direct line down the river, and from the two extremities of that line, reaching back at right angles sufficiently far to include the quantity of land required, which somewhat exceeded 4.5 miles (7.2 km). Of these 24,000 acres (97 km^{2}), 4,000 acres (16 km^{2}) were awarded to John Gabriel Gervais for having pursued the grant; the remaining 20,000 acres (81 km^{2}) were split into 92 lots of 217.4 acres (0.880 km^{2}) each.

Another 1,200 acres (4.9 km^{2}) additional were granted on June 25, 1798 called the Second Grant. These 150 acres (0.61 km^{2}) lots adjoined the first Grant towards its lower end. This grant was for eight Gallipolis residents who did not receive a portion of the First Grant.

== See also ==
- Ohio Lands
- Historic regions of the United States
