= Portsmouth, Ohio =

- City
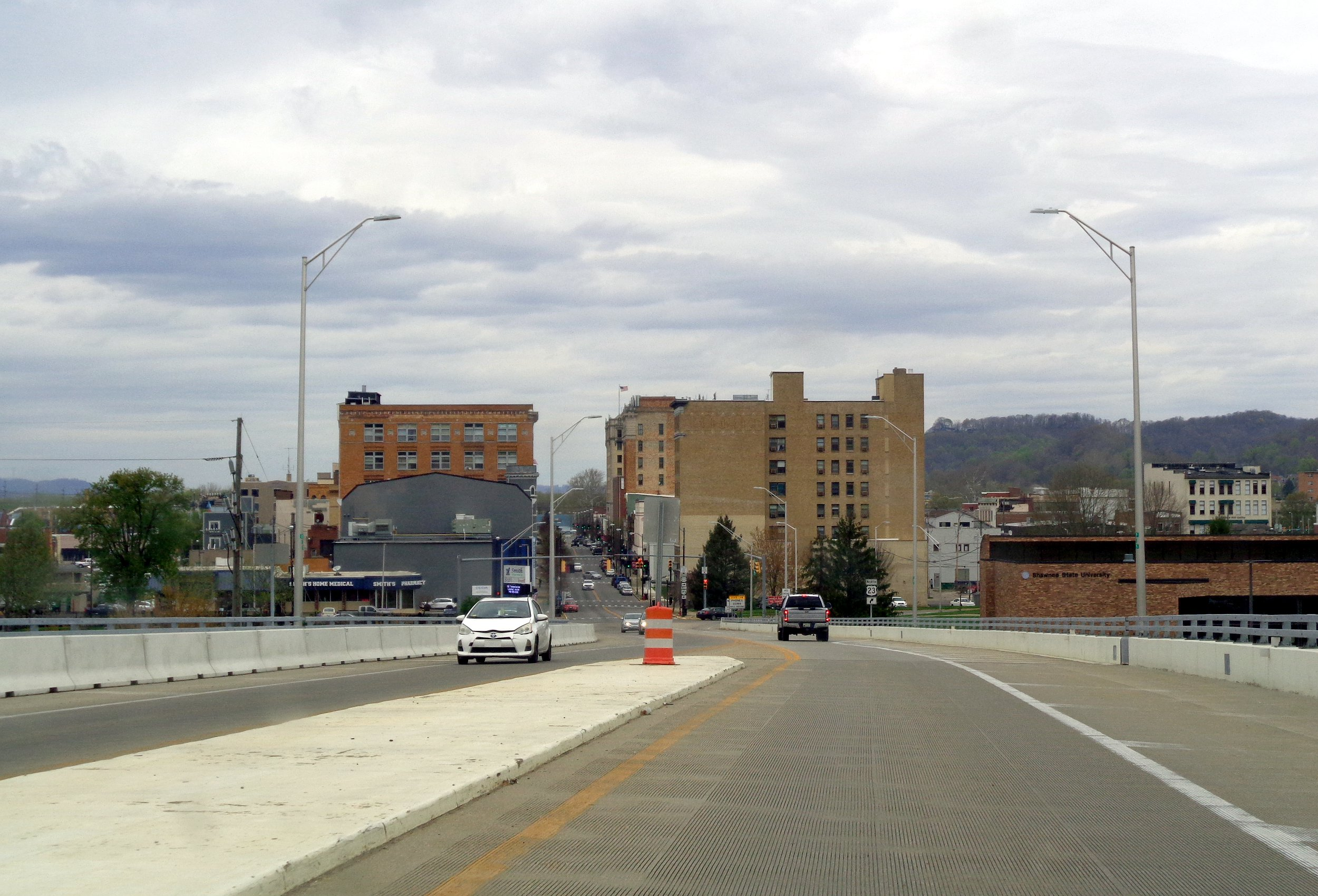
- Downtown Portsmouth looking north from U.S. Grant Bridge

- Flag Seal
- Nickname: P-Town
- Motto: "Where Southern Hospitality Begins"
- Interactive map of Portsmouth, Ohio
- Location within Ohio Location within the United States
- Coordinates: 38°44′22″N 82°56′40″W
- Country: United States
- State: Ohio
- County: Scioto
- Founded: 1803
- Incorporated: 1815

Government
  - Type: Council–manager
  - Mayor: Charlotte Gordon
  - City Manager: Sam Sutherland

Area
  - Total: 11.08 sq mi (28.69 km^{2})
  - Land: 10.73 sq mi (27.79 km^{2})
  - Water: 0.35 sq mi (0.90 km^{2})
- Elevation: 846 ft (258 m)

Population (2020)
  - Total: 18,252
  - Estimate (2025): 17,282
  - Density: 1,701.2/sq mi (656.82/km^{2})
- Time zone: UTC-5 (EST)
  - Summer (DST): UTC-4 (EDT)
- ZIP code: 45662
- Area code: 740
- FIPS code: 39-64304
- GNIS feature ID: 1086933
- Website: portsmouthohio.org

Portsmouth is a city in Scioto County, Ohio, United States, and its county seat. Located in southern Ohio 41 miles (66 km) south of Chillicothe, it lies on the north bank of the Ohio River, across from Kentucky and just east of the mouth of the Scioto River. The population was 18,252 at the 2020 census. It is the principal city of the Portsmouth micropolitan area.

== History ==
=== Foundation ===
The area was occupied by Native Americans as early as 100 BC, as indicated by the Portsmouth Earthworks, a ceremonial center built by the Ohio Hopewell culture between 100 and 500 AD.

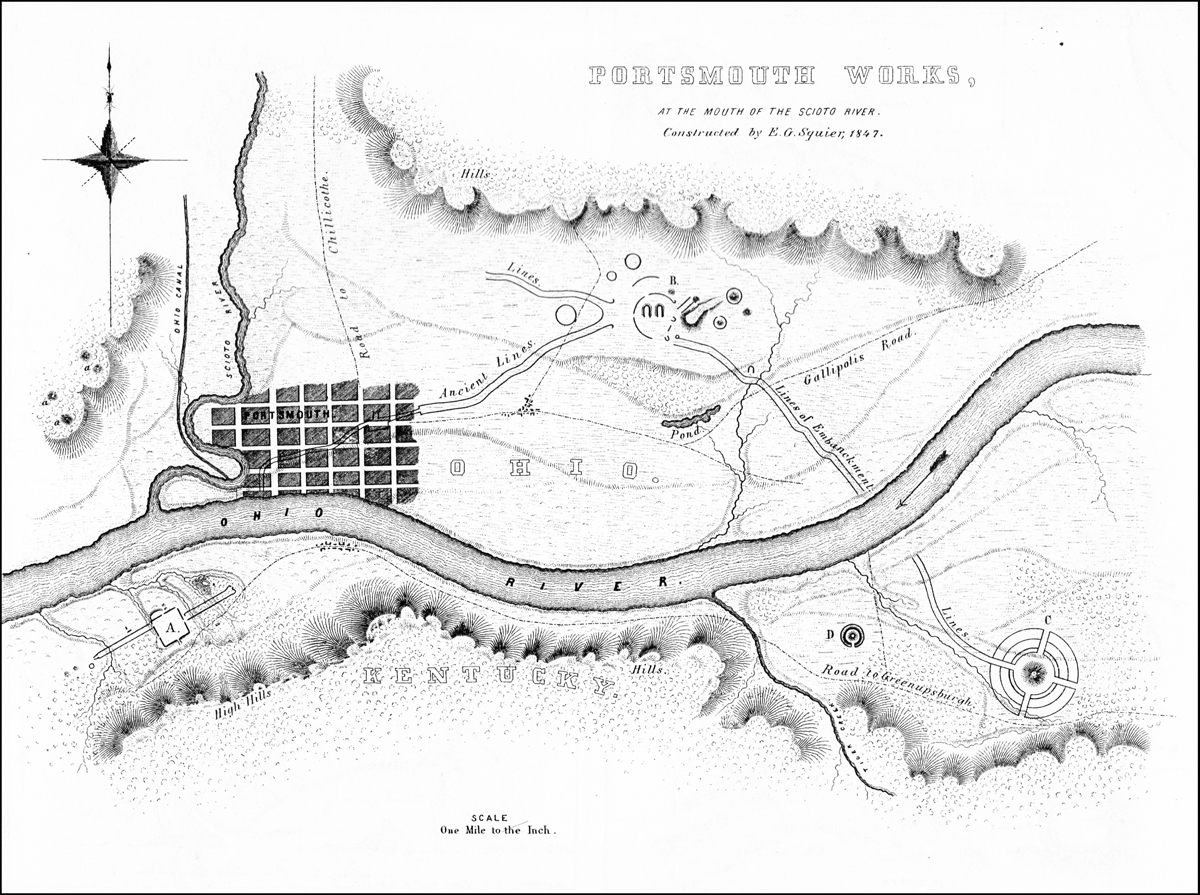
1847 map showing the location of the Portsmouth Earthworks northeast of Portsmouth.

According to early 20th-century historian Charles Augustus Hanna, a Shawnee village was founded at the site of modern-day Portsmouth in late 1758, following the abandonment of Lower Shawneetown.

European-Americans began to settle in the 1790s after the American Revolutionary War, and the small town of Alexandria was founded. Located at the confluence, Alexandria was flooded numerous times by the Ohio River and the Scioto River.

In 1796, Emanuel Traxler became the first person of European descent to permanently occupy land in what would later be known as Portsmouth, after the United States gained its independence.

In 1803, Henry Massie found a better location slightly east and somewhat removed from the flood plains. He began to plot the new city by mapping the streets and distributing the land. Portsmouth was founded in 1803 and established as a city in 1815. It was designated as the county seat. Settlers left Alexandria, and it soon disappeared. Massie named Portsmouth after the town of Portsmouth, New Hampshire.

The Ohio state legislature passed "Black Laws" in 1804 that restricted movement of free blacks and required persons to carry papers, in an effort to dissuade blacks from settling in the state. These provisions were intermittently enforced by local governments and law enforcement, and sometimes used as an excuse to force African Americans out of settlements. In 1831, Portsmouth drove out African Americans from the city under this pretext. Many settled several miles north in what became known as Huston's Hollow, along the Scioto River. Its residents, especially Joseph Love and Dan Lucas, provided aid to refugee slaves in the following years and assisted them in moving north.

Although southern Ohio was dominated in number by anti-abolitionist settlers from the South, some whites also worked to improve conditions for blacks and aid refugee slaves. Portsmouth became important in the antebellum years as part of the Underground Railroad. Fugitive slaves from Kentucky and other parts of the South crossed the Ohio River here. Some found their future in Portsmouth; others moved north along the Scioto River to reach Detroit, Michigan, and get farther away from slave catchers. Many continued into Canada to secure their freedom. A historical marker near the Grant Bridge commemorates this period of Portsmouth's history. James Ashley, an abolitionist who wrote the Thirteenth Amendment to the United States Constitution, briefly lived in Portsmouth.

Portsmouth quickly developed an industrial base due to its location at the confluence of the Ohio and Scioto rivers. Early industrial growth included having meat packing and shipping facilities for Thomas Worthington's Chillicothe farm, located north of Portsmouth on the Scioto River. Its growth was stimulated by the completion of the Ohio and Erie Canal in the 1820s and 1830s, which provided access to the Great Lakes, opening up northern markets.

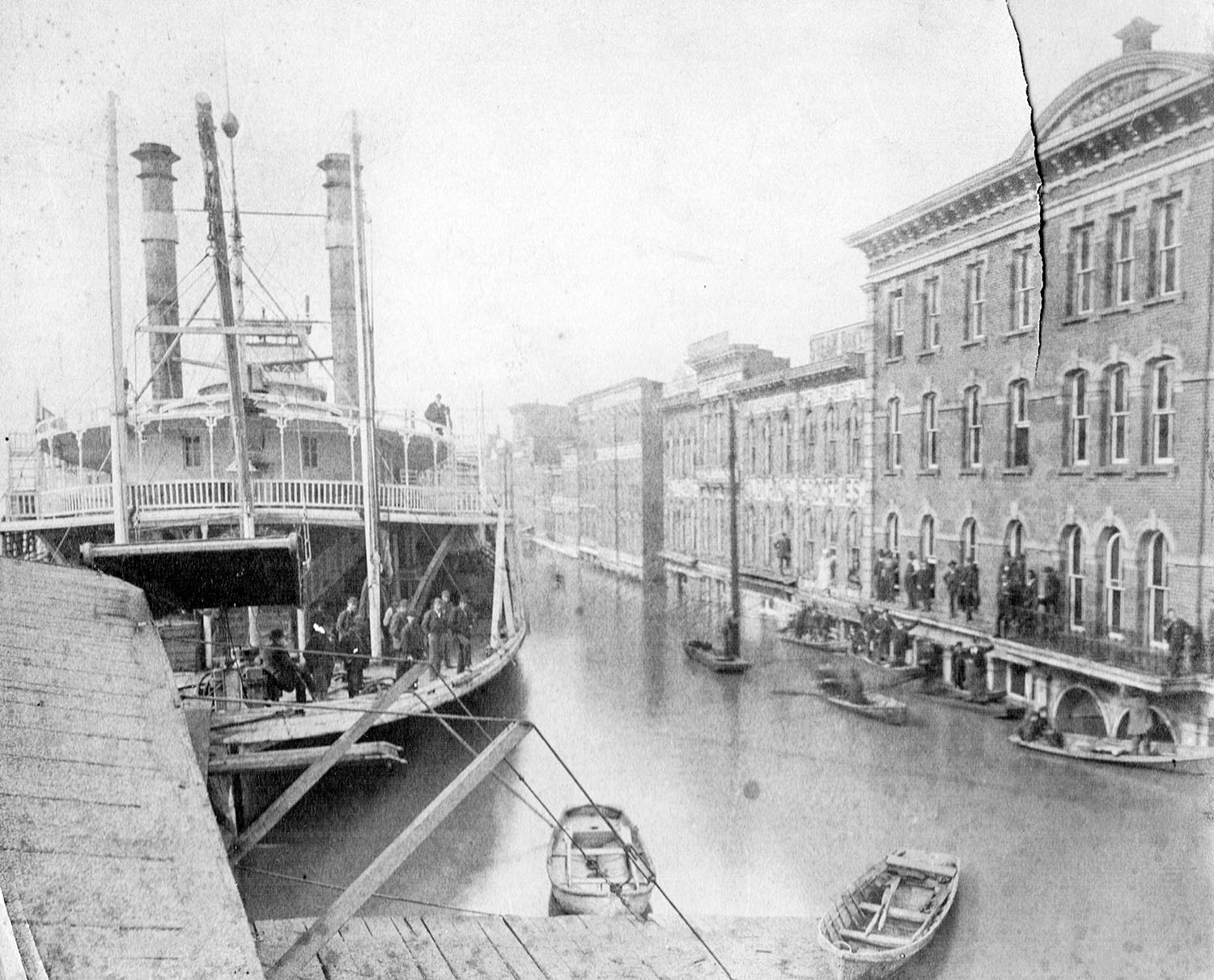
The steamer Bonanza in Portsmouth during the 1884 flood

The construction of the Norfolk and Western (N&W) railyards beginning in 1838 and the completion of the Baltimore and Ohio Railroad (B&O) junction at the city in the late 1850s quickly surpassed the canal in stimulating growth. The railroads soon carried more freight than the canal, with the B&O connecting the city to markets in Baltimore and Washington, DC. By the end of the 19th century, Portsmouth was one of the most important industrial cities on the Ohio River between Pittsburgh and Cincinnati. It became an iron and steel factory town with new companies like the Portsmouth Steel Company.

=== 20th century ===
The city's growth continued. By 1916, during World War I, Portsmouth was listed as being a major industrial and jobbing center, the nation's fourth-largest shoe manufacturing center, and the nation's largest manufacturer of fire and paving bricks. Wheeling-Pittsburgh Steel (later called Empire-Detroit Steel) employed over 1,000 people. 100 other manufacturing companies produced goods from furniture to engines.

Such industrial and shipping growth greatly benefited Boneyfiddle, a west-end neighborhood in Portsmouth, where grand buildings were constructed with wealth from the commerce. As time passed, commercial activity began to move toward Chillicothe Street, which has remained Portsmouth's main thoroughfare.

The city population peaked at just over 42,000 in 1930. In 1931, the Norfolk Southern Corporation built a grand, art deco passenger station at 16th and Findlay streets that provided a substantial entry to the city. Passengers used the station for access to both interstate and intrastate train lines, which provided basic transportation for many. The widespread availability of affordable automobiles and changing patterns resulted in reduction in rail passenger traffic in Portsmouth and nationally. The station was later used for offices, its keys were turned over to Scioto County in 2003, and the building was demolished in 2004.

Suburbanization also affected the city. By the 1950 census, the population had begun to decline, falling below 40,000. Some of this change was due to the effects of highway construction, which stimulated suburban residential development in the postwar years. Furthermore, in the late 20th century, foreign competition and industrial restructuring resulted in the loss of many industrial jobs, on which Portsmouth's economy had been based; the jobs moved out of the area, with many going overseas.

Further decline occurred in 1980 after the suspension of operations at Empire Detroit Steel's Portsmouth Works, which took place after the sale of the steel plant to Armco Steel. Armco Steel closed the plant to avoid replacing the obsolete open hearth furnaces with more efficient basic oxygen steel furnaces. The plant also needed a continuous caster to replace the obsolete soaking pits and blooming mill in 1995. When the steel mill closed, 1,300 steelworkers were laid off.

=== 21st century ===
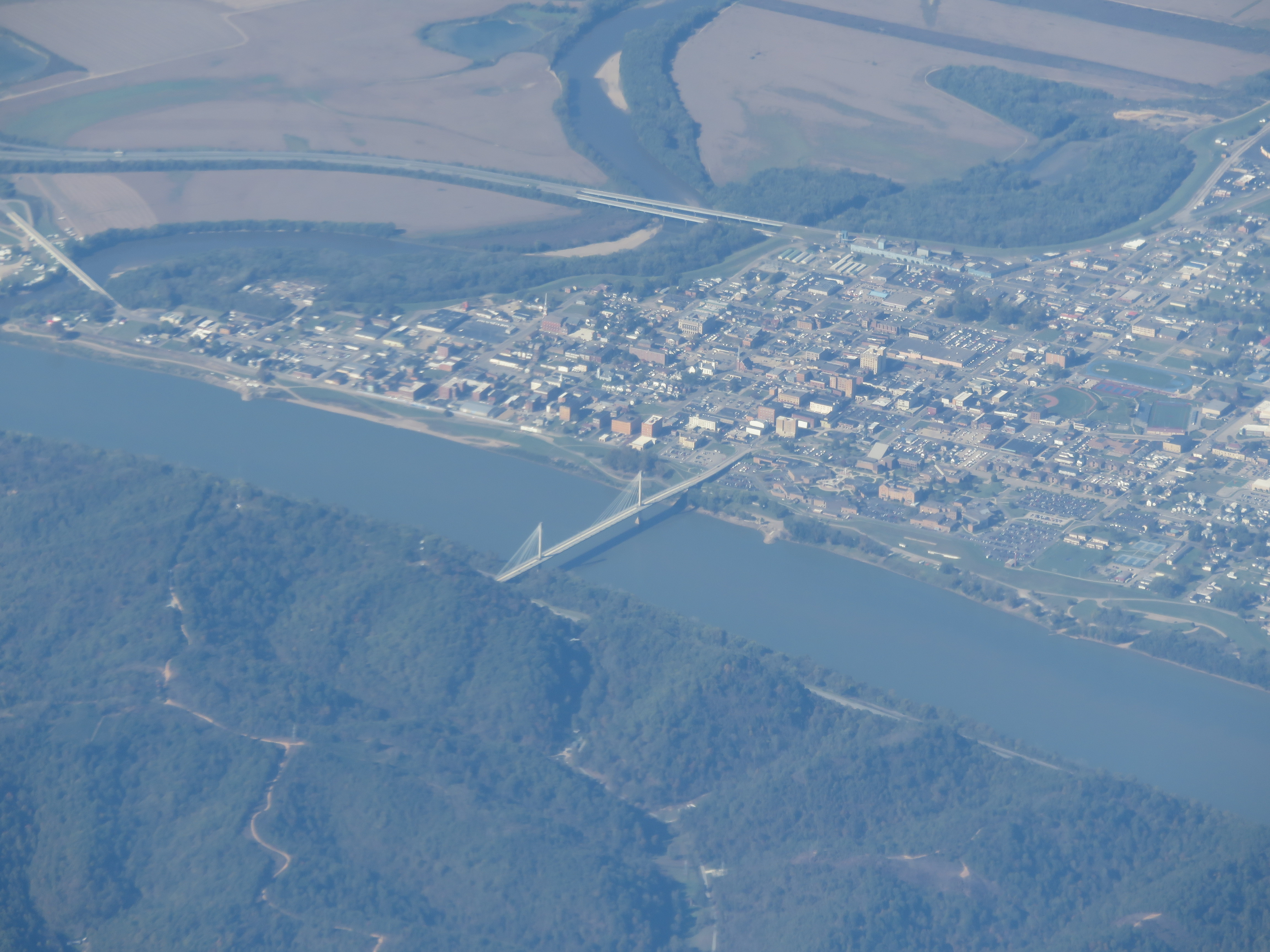
Aerial view of downtown Portsmouth

As of 2010, Portsmouth has a population of approximately 20,000, losing population due to outsourcing of unskilled labor and migration to more populous urban areas. Despite its relatively small size, Portsmouth has been a regular stop for recent presidential campaigns. In September 2004, George W. Bush visited the city as part of his reelection campaign. Vice-presidential candidate John Edwards also visited Portsmouth that month. During the 2008 campaign, numerous candidates and surrogates visited Portsmouth, and some spoke at Shawnee State University: Bill Clinton on behalf of Hillary Clinton, Republican nominee John McCain, and U.S. Senator Barack Obama, who won the election. In 2012, candidate Mitt Romney spoke at Shawnee State University. In March 2016, Bill Clinton visited Portsmouth again to campaign for Hillary Clinton. In August 2017, U.S. Senator and former presidential candidate Bernie Sanders spoke at a rally at Shawnee State University.

Portsmouth and other parts of Scioto County have worked to redevelop blighted properties and create a new economy. Along with adapting disused residential properties, Portsmouth has begun the process of transforming abandoned industrial and commercial properties to other uses.

The city has initiated new developments in its downtown. The Ohio Legislature passed House Bill 233 on April 20, 2016, to authorize cities to create Downtown Redevelopment Districts. They operate similarly to a Tax Increment Finance (TIF) District. Portsmouth formed a Downtown Redevelopment District (DRD) in 2017 in Boneyfiddle to increase investment and development in the neighborhood.

Through the early 21st century, there has been a noticeable increase in investment in Portsmouth's local economy. New investments and developments in the local economy led to Portsmouth's inclusion in Site Selection Magazine's "Top 10 Micropolitan areas". Celina, Defiance and Portsmouth were among a group of cities tied for 10th. Portsmouth attracted nine significant economic development projects in 2016, nearly as many as it had from 2004 to 2013 combined.

In 2014, Portsmouth was one of 350 cities to enter a submission in the America's Best Communities competition, hoping to win the $3 million first place prize. In April 2015, Portsmouth was chosen as one of the 50 quarter-finalists, winning $50,000 to help prepare a Community Revitalization Plan. In January 2016, Portsmouth's plan, which emphasized using its most valuable asset, the Ohio River, as a key to revitalizing the city, earned it one of 15 spots in the competition's semifinals. In April 2016, Portsmouth was one of seven cities eliminated at the semifinal round, but received an additional $25,000 for use in continuing to develop its plans to improve commercial and community access to the riverfront by making the port a premier regional destination for industrial development, small business development, and riverfront recreation.

In 2019, Portsmouth was named Hallmarks' Hometown Christmas Town. The Friends of Portsmouth group held the annual Winterfest celebration event that brought Christmas lights, vendors, ice skating, carriage rides, tree lighting, and more to Market Square.

== Geography ==
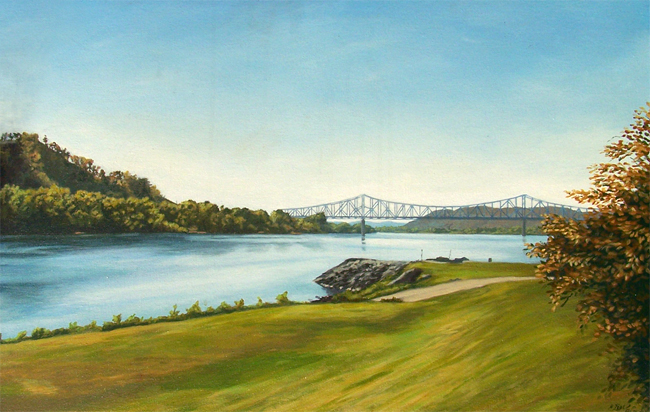
A painting of the confluence of the Ohio and Scioto rivers, showing the dissected plateau terrain and the Carl D. Perkins Bridge.

Portsmouth is at the confluence of the Ohio, Scioto, and Little Scioto rivers. It is a midway point between Charleston, West Virginia; Cincinnati and Columbus, Ohio; and Lexington, Kentucky, which are all about 90 miles (140 km) away.

Much of the terrain is quite hilly due to dissected plateau around it. Both rivers have carved valleys and Portsmouth lies next to both the Scioto and Ohio rivers. It is within the ecoregion of the Western Allegheny Plateau. According to the United States Census Bureau, the city has an area of 11.07 square miles (28.67 km^{2}), of which 10.73 square miles (27.79 km^{2}) is land and 0.34 square miles (0.88 km^{2}) is water.

=== Neighborhoods ===
- Sciotoville, 5 miles (8.0 km) in the eastern part of Portsmouth off US 52 at Ohio 335; it is sometimes known as East Portsmouth, but it is within the city limits, with about 10% of the city's population living there.
- North Moreland, a community within Portsmouth, north of the Village of New Boston. North Moreland connects the larger western section of Portsmouth with Sciotoville.
- Boneyfiddle, several blocks west of downtown Portsmouth, generally centered around the Market St./2nd St. intersection
- Hilltop, residential neighborhoods in Portsmouth north of 17th St., west of Thomas Ave and east of Scioto Trail
- North End, a mixed black community within Portsmouth, north of The Ohio River. Farley Square Apartments is the heart of the North End, along with Bannon Park.

=== Climate ===
Portsmouth has a humid subtropical climate (Cfa) closely bordering a hot-summer humid continental climate (Dfa.) Average monthly temperatures range from 32.1 °F (0.1 °C) in January to 76.1 °F (24.5 °C) in July. All months average above freezing, three months average above 22 °C or 71.6 °F and seven months average above 10 °C or 50 °F.

Climate data for Portsmouth, Ohio (1991–2020 normals, extremes 1893–present)
Month	Jan	Feb	Mar	Apr	May	Jun	Jul	Aug	Sep	Oct	Nov	Dec	Year
Record high °F (°C)	79 (26)	79 (26)	96 (36)	97 (36)	99 (37)	103 (39)	107 (42)	105 (41)	103 (39)	94 (34)	85 (29)	76 (24)	107 (42)
Mean maximum °F (°C)	64.4 (18.0)	67.4 (19.7)	75.8 (24.3)	83.3 (28.5)	88.0 (31.1)	91.7 (33.2)	93.9 (34.4)	93.2 (34.0)	91.5 (33.1)	84.2 (29.0)	75.5 (24.2)	65.3 (18.5)	95.2 (35.1)
Mean daily maximum °F (°C)	41.3 (5.2)	45.2 (7.3)	55.0 (12.8)	67.3 (19.6)	75.8 (24.3)	83.4 (28.6)	86.7 (30.4)	86.0 (30.0)	80.3 (26.8)	68.9 (20.5)	56.3 (13.5)	45.7 (7.6)	66.0 (18.9)
Daily mean °F (°C)	32.1 (0.1)	35.1 (1.7)	43.8 (6.6)	54.7 (12.6)	64.1 (17.8)	72.4 (22.4)	76.1 (24.5)	74.7 (23.7)	68.2 (20.1)	56.3 (13.5)	44.8 (7.1)	36.7 (2.6)	54.9 (12.7)
Mean daily minimum °F (°C)	22.9 (−5.1)	25.0 (−3.9)	32.6 (0.3)	42.1 (5.6)	52.4 (11.3)	61.3 (16.3)	65.4 (18.6)	63.4 (17.4)	56.1 (13.4)	43.6 (6.4)	33.4 (0.8)	27.6 (−2.4)	43.8 (6.6)
Mean minimum °F (°C)	4.3 (−15.4)	9.0 (−12.8)	16.8 (−8.4)	27.5 (−2.5)	37.1 (2.8)	49.0 (9.4)	55.7 (13.2)	53.6 (12.0)	43.1 (6.2)	30.9 (−0.6)	20.2 (−6.6)	12.8 (−10.7)	1.5 (−16.9)
Record low °F (°C)	−29 (−34)	−18 (−28)	0 (−18)	14 (−10)	28 (−2)	38 (3)	40 (4)	35 (2)	28 (−2)	18 (−8)	2 (−17)	−18 (−28)	−29 (−34)
Average precipitation inches (mm)	3.09 (78)	3.00 (76)	4.12 (105)	3.95 (100)	4.60 (117)	4.14 (105)	4.42 (112)	3.27 (83)	3.30 (84)	2.95 (75)	2.75 (70)	3.50 (89)	43.09 (1,094)
Average precipitation days (≥ 0.01 in)	11.3	10.9	12.0	12.1	13.2	12.0	11.3	9.1	8.1	9.1	9.9	11.5	130.5
Source: NOAA

== Demographics ==
Historical population
Census	Pop.	Note	%±
1820	527		—
1830	1,064		101.9%
1840	1,844		73.3%
1850	4,011		117.5%
1860	6,268		56.3%
1870	10,592		69.0%
1880	11,321		6.9%
1890	12,394		9.5%
1900	17,870		44.2%
1910	23,481		31.4%
1920	33,011		40.6%
1930	42,560		28.9%
1940	40,466		−4.9%
1950	36,798		−9.1%
1960	33,637		−8.6%
1970	27,633		−17.8%
1980	25,993		−5.9%
1990	22,676		−12.8%
2000	20,909		−7.8%
2010	20,226		−3.3%
2020	18,252		−9.8%
2025 (est.)	17,282		−5.3%

=== 2020 census ===
As of the 2020 census, Portsmouth had a population of 18,252. The median age was 37.7 years. 21.0% of residents were under the age of 18 and 18.2% of residents were 65 years of age or older. For every 100 females there were 88.3 males, and for every 100 females age 18 and over there were 84.4 males age 18 and over.

96.8% of residents lived in urban areas, while 3.2% lived in rural areas.

There were 7,590 households in Portsmouth, of which 25.4% had children under the age of 18 living in them. Of all households, 30.5% were married-couple households, 22.7% were households with a male householder and no spouse or partner present, and 38.1% were households with a female householder and no spouse or partner present. About 38.3% of all households were made up of individuals and 16.8% had someone living alone who was 65 years of age or older.

There were 8,782 housing units, of which 13.6% were vacant. The homeowner vacancy rate was 2.8% and the rental vacancy rate was 8.3%.

Racial composition as of the 2020 census
Race	Number	Percent
White	15,825	86.7%
Black or African American	1,014	5.6%
American Indian and Alaska Native	77	0.4%
Asian	123	0.7%
Native Hawaiian and Other Pacific Islander	4	0.0%
Some other race	302	1.7%
Two or more races	907	5.0%
Hispanic or Latino (of any race)	455	2.5%

=== 2010 census ===
As of the 2010 census, 20,226 people, 8,286 households, and 4,707 families resided in the city. The population density was 1,885.0 inhabitants per square mile (727.8/km^{2}). There were 9,339 housing units at an average density of 870.4 per square mile (336.1/km^{2}). The city's racial makeup was 90.1% White, 5.1% African American, 0.4% Native American, 0.6% Asian, 0.7% from other races, and 3.0% from two or more races. 2.2% of the population was Hispanic or Latino of any race.

There were 8,286 households, of which 28.5% had children under 18 living with them, 33.9% were married couples living together, 17.5% had a female householder with no husband present, 5.4% had a male householder with no wife present, and 43.2% were non-families. 35.9% of all households were made up of individuals, and 15.5% had someone living alone who was 65 or older. The average household size was 2.28 and the average family size was 2.93.

The median age in the city was 36.1. 21.6% of residents were under 18; 14.3% were between 18 and 24; 23.6% were from 25 to 44; 24.2% were from 45 to 64; and 16.4% were 65 or older. The gender makeup of the city was 46.4% male and 53.6% female.

=== 2000 census ===
As of the 2000 census, 20,909 people, 9,120 households, and 5,216 families resided in the city. The population density was 1,941.4 inhabitants per square mile (749.6/km^{2}). There were 10,248 housing units at an average density of 951.5 per square mile (367.4/km^{2}). The city's racial makeup was 91.50% White, 5.00% African American, 0.63% Native American, 0.61% Asian, 0.02% Pacific Islander, 0.32% from other races, and 1.92% from two or more races. 0.93% of the population was Hispanic or Latino of any race.

There were 9,120 households, of which 25.9% had children under 18 living with them, 37.9% were married couples living together, 15.6% had a female householder with no husband present, and 42.8% were non-families. 37.3% of all households were made up of individuals, and 17.8% had someone living alone who was 65 years or older. The average household size was 2.19 and the average family size was 2.87.

The population was diverse in terms of age, with 22.0% under 18, 11.3% from 18 to 24, 25.9% from 25 to 44, 21.2% from 45 to 64, and 19.6% who were 65 or older. The median age was 38. For every 100 females, there were 83.8 males. For every 100 females 18 and over, there were 78.3 males.

The median income for a household in the city was $23,004, and the median income for a family was $31,237. Males had a median income of $31,521 versus $20,896 for females. The per capita income was $15,078. About 18.3% of families and 23.6% of the population were below the poverty line, including 31.1% of those under 18 and 14.5% of those 65 or older.

== Economy ==
Portsmouth's major employers include Southern Ohio Medical Center, Kings Daughters Medical Center Ohio, Shawnee State University, Norfolk Southern Railway, Southern Ohio Correctional Facility, and OSCO Industries. In November 2002, the Portsmouth Gaseous Diffusion Plant in nearby Piketon, Ohio, was recognized as a Nuclear Historic Landmark by the American Nuclear Society. It served a military purpose from 1952 until the mid-1960s, when the mission changed from enriching uranium for nuclear weapons to producing fuel for commercial nuclear power plants. The Portsmouth Gaseous Diffusion Plant ended enriching operations in 2001 and began to support operational and administrative functions and perform external contract work. The site is being cleaned up for future development by Fluor/ B&W.

Graf Brothers Flooring and Lumber, the world's largest manufacturer of rift and quartered oak products, has two satellite log yards in Portsmouth, with the company's main office across the river in South Shore, Kentucky. Portsmouth is the home of Sole Choice Inc., one of the world's largest manufacturers of shoelaces.

== Arts and culture ==
=== Buildings and landmarks ===
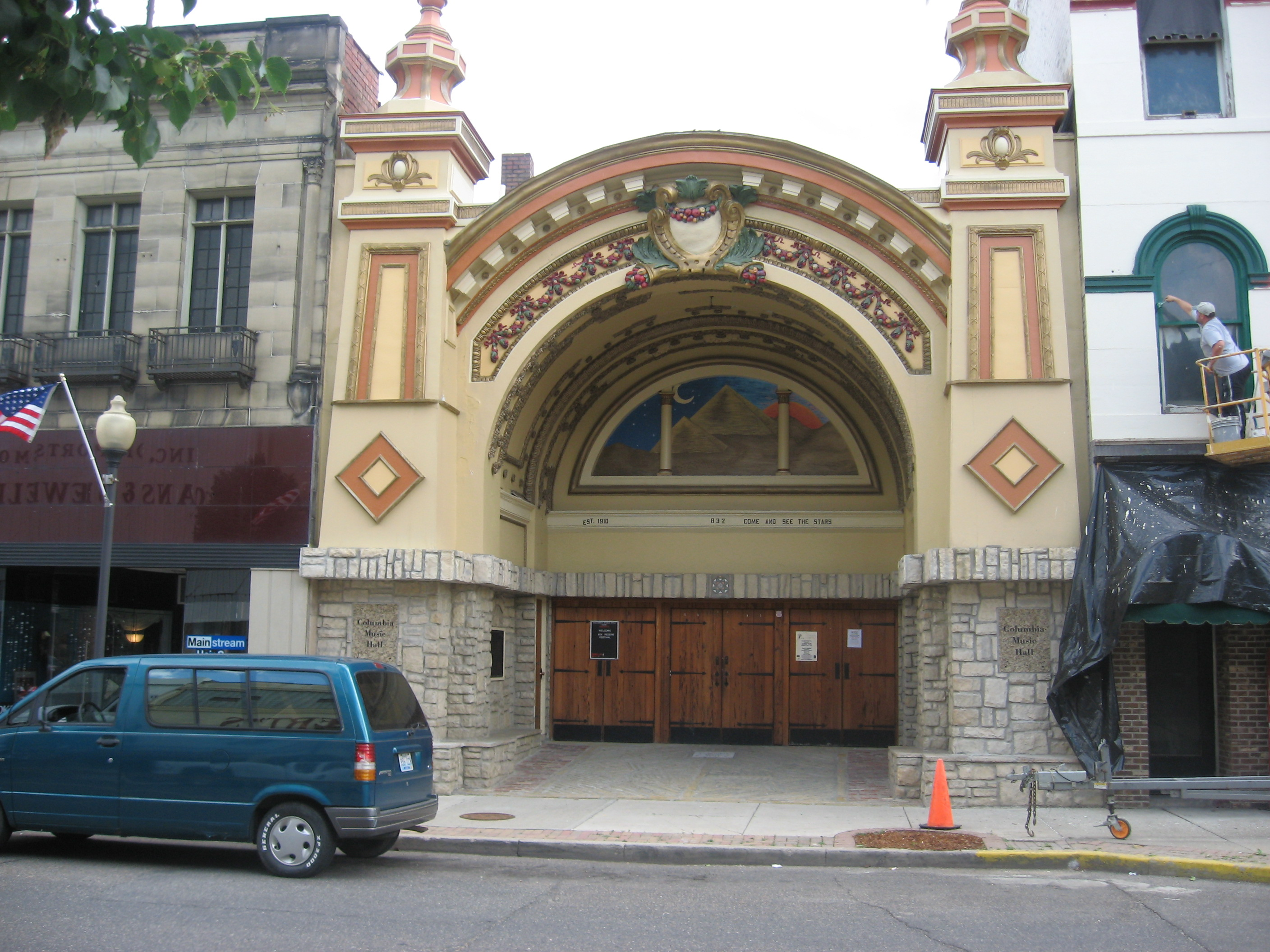
The façade of the historic Columbia Music Hall, the only portion remaining after a fire in 2007, rebuilt in 2012 as the open air Columbia Music Arena.

Many historical buildings in Portsmouth have been demolished because of poor upkeep and the completion of new buildings replacing the landmarks. Demolished landmarks include the old Norfolk & Western rail depot, churches dating back to the early 20th century, houses dating to the 1850s, Grant Middle School, the old Portsmouth High School, and various elementary schools.

Many buildings have survived from the early 19th century. Old churches are among the reminders of Portsmouth's past and identity. The historic 1910 Columbia Theater was destroyed by a fire in 2007, demolished, and rebuilt in 2012 as the open-air Columbia Music Hall, with a refurbished façade from the original structure serving as the entry point. Other noted historic buildings include the old monastery, Spartan Stadium, as well as numerous buildings in the Boneyfiddle Historic District, which is listed on the National Register of Historic Places. In 1982, Miami University students conducted research on several of Portsmouth's most important historic buildings. This work resulted in an exhibition at the Miami University Art Museum and a book, Portsmouth: Architecture in an Ohio River Town.

In October 2016, a Shawnee State University professor submitted a proposal to the State Farm Neighborhood Assist grant program to preserve Spartan Municipal Stadium. The stadium opened in 1930 as the original home of the Portsmouth Spartans, now the fifth-oldest active franchise in the National Football League (as the Detroit Lions). In November 2016, the city won a $25,000 State Farm Neighborhood Assist grant for the stadium's renovation.

=== Library ===
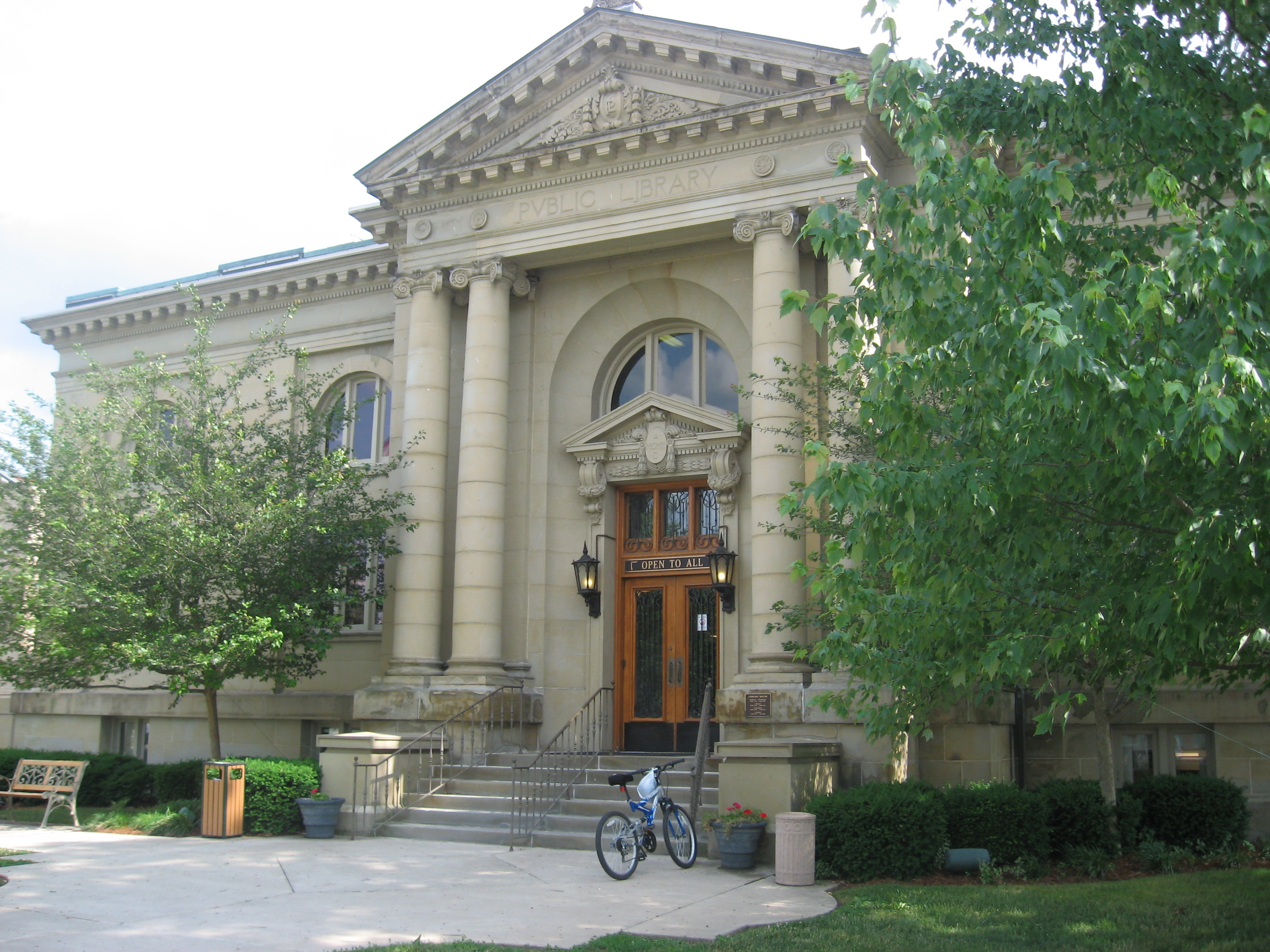
Portsmouth Public Library

The Portsmouth Public Library is the city's library, founded in 1879. It has branch libraries throughout Scioto County. The Southern Ohio Museum, founded in 1979, has more than 60 exhibits, including China dolls, Native American artifacts, and artwork by Clarence Holbrook Carter, Jesse Stuart, and local artists.

=== Floodwalls ===
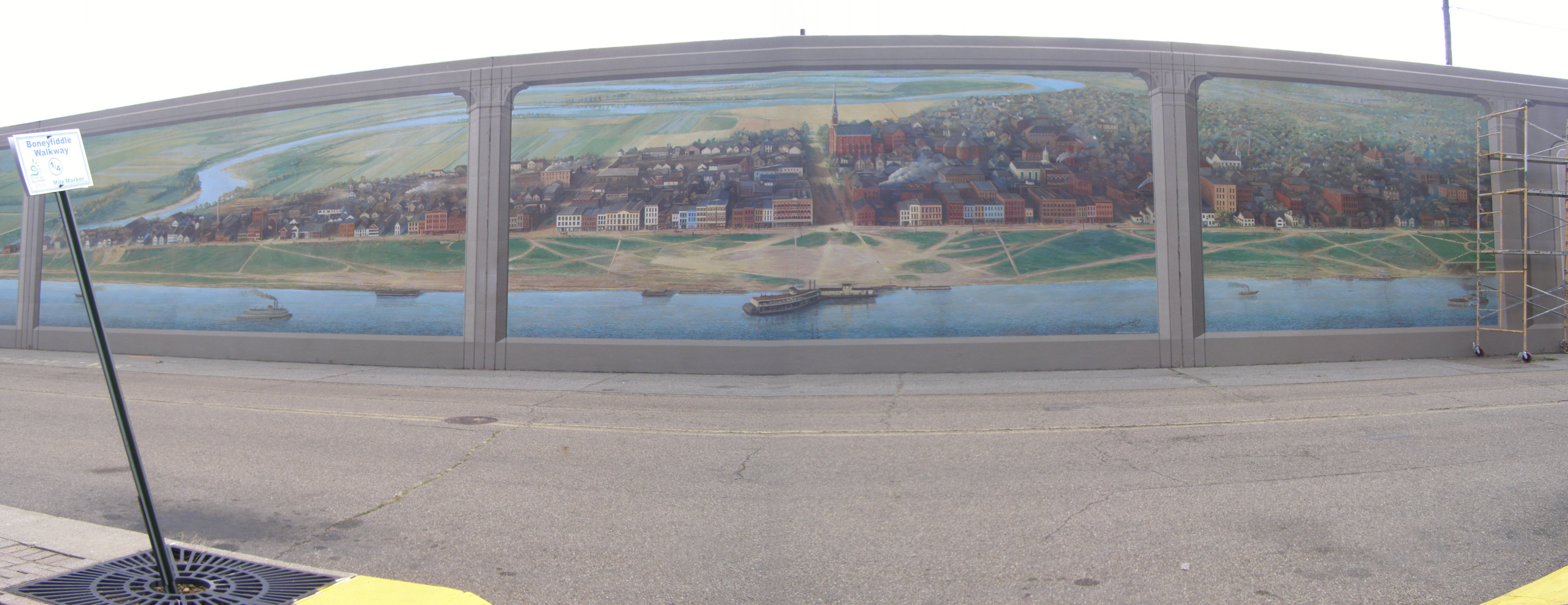
Floodwall mural showing the city of Portsmouth as it appeared in 1903

Despite being developed on higher ground, the city has been subject to seasonal flooding. It experienced extensive floods in 1884, 1913, and 1937. After the Ohio River flood of 1937, the U.S. Army Corps of Engineers constructed a floodwall protecting the city, which prevented two major floods in 1964 and 1997.

In 1992, Portsmouth began honoring some of the locals' accomplishments by placing a star on the riverside of the floodwall. This is known as the Portsmouth Wall of Fame and was instituted by then-mayor Frank Gerlach. Honorees include Don Gullett, Al Oliver, and Dan Quayle, who is not a Portsmouth native.

In 1992, a nonprofit group headed by Louis R. and Ava Chaboudy was formed to investigate developing a mural-based tourist attraction on the floodwall. In 1993, muralist Robert Dafford was commissioned and began painting murals of Portsmouth's history, hiring local art student Herb Roe as an assistant, who apprenticed to and worked for Dafford for 15 years. The project eventually featured sixty 20 feet (6.1 m) tall murals, stretching for over 2,000 feet (610 m).

The murals cover:

- The Portsmouth Earthworks, a large mound complex constructed by the Ohio Hopewell culture from 100 BC to 500 AD.
- Lower Shawneetown, a Shawnee village that straddled the Ohio River just downstream during the late 18th century.
- The 1749 "Lead Plate Expedition" to advance France's territorial claim on the Ohio Valley, led by Pierre Joseph Céloron de Blainville.
- Tecumseh, a Shawnee leader who directed a large tribal confederacy against the U.S. during Tecumseh's War and the War of 1812.
- Henry Massie, a surveyor and founding father of the town, who laid out the original plat in 1803.
- A Civil War unit from Portsmouth, Battery L, fighting at Gettysburg.
- Jim Thorpe, a Native American athlete who played as the player/coach of the semi-professional Portsmouth Shoesteels in the late 1920s.
- The Portsmouth Spartans, a member of the NFL from 1929 to 1933.
- Branch Rickey, influential baseball coach, inventor of the farm team system, and the signer of Jackie Robinson to Major League Baseball.
- Clarence Holbrook Carter, an American Regionalist and surrealist painter.
- Carl Ackerman, local photographer and historic photo collector, whose collection was used for many of the river murals.
- The disastrous Ohio River flood of 1937, which led to the construction of the floodwall.
- Transportation – stagecoaches, riverboats, railroads and the Ohio and Erie Canal, which had its terminus just outside Portsmouth.
- Local notables including Roy Rogers, Jesse Stuart, Julia Marlowe, and Vern Riffe.
- Other panels explore the local history of education, the first European settlers, industries (including the steel industry, shoe industry, and the Portsmouth Gaseous Diffusion Plant), sister cities, the local Carnegie library, firemen and police, period genre scenes of old downtown and other localities, and a memorial to area armed forces veterans.

The original mural project was finished in 2003. Since then, additional panels have been added, like murals honoring Portsmouth's baseball heroes in 2006, and the Tour of the Scioto River Valley (TOSRV), a bicycle tour between Columbus and Portsmouth, in 2007.

=== Indian Head Rock ===
The Indian Head Rock is an eight-ton sandstone boulder that, until 2007, rested at the bottom of the Ohio River. Historically, the boulder was used to record low river stages. The figures and names of notable people are carved into the rock and were visible at times of low water levels. In 1917, the construction of a dam downriver from Portsmouth meant that the rock would forever be submerged, if not for its recovery by a group of local divers. The rock's removal led Kentucky and Ohio into a legislative battle to determine its ownership and disposition. The rock was returned to Kentucky in 2010.

=== Guinness World Records ===
Portsmouth's leaders and citizens have organized to win certification for several Guinness World Records for the city. In 2018, the "Friends Plant Portsmouth" participants shattered the record for the most people simultaneously potting plants. Later that year, Portsmouth beat Waukesha, Wisconsin, the previous world record holder, for the most people simultaneously Christmas caroling, which now stands at 1,822 carolers. They also beat the previous record for most people wrapping Christmas presents simultaneously.

== Sports ==
Portsmouth had a series of semi-pro football teams in the 1920s and 1930s, the most notable being the Portsmouth Shoe-Steels, whose roster included player-coach Jim Thorpe.

From 1929 to 1933, the city was home to the Portsmouth Spartans, which joined the National Football League (NFL) in 1930. Early in that season, the Spartans competed in the first professional football night game, shutting out the visiting Brooklyn Dodgers 12–0 on September 24, 1930. Despite their on-field success, the team was in constant financial trouble as a result of being based in the NFL's second-smallest city during the Great Depression. This forced the sale of the team and its relocation to Detroit in 1934, where it became the Detroit Lions.

In the late 20th century, the Portsmouth Explorers were one of the original teams in the Frontier League, a non-affiliated minor league baseball organization. The Explorers played in the league's first three seasons, from 1993 to 1995. In 1938, Portsmouth was also the home of the Portsmouth Red Birds, a minor-league team owned by the St. Louis Cardinals.

In the late 1990s, Portsmouth was home to the Superstar Wrestling Federation before its demise. More recently, Revolutionary Championship Wrestling has made its home in Portsmouth, airing on local TV station WQCW. Revolutionary Championship Wrestling in Portsmouth has featured such stars as Big Van Vader, Jerry "The King" Lawler, Demolition Ax, "Beautiful" Bobby Eaton, "Wildcat" Chris Harris, and Ivan Koloff.

== Parks and recreation ==
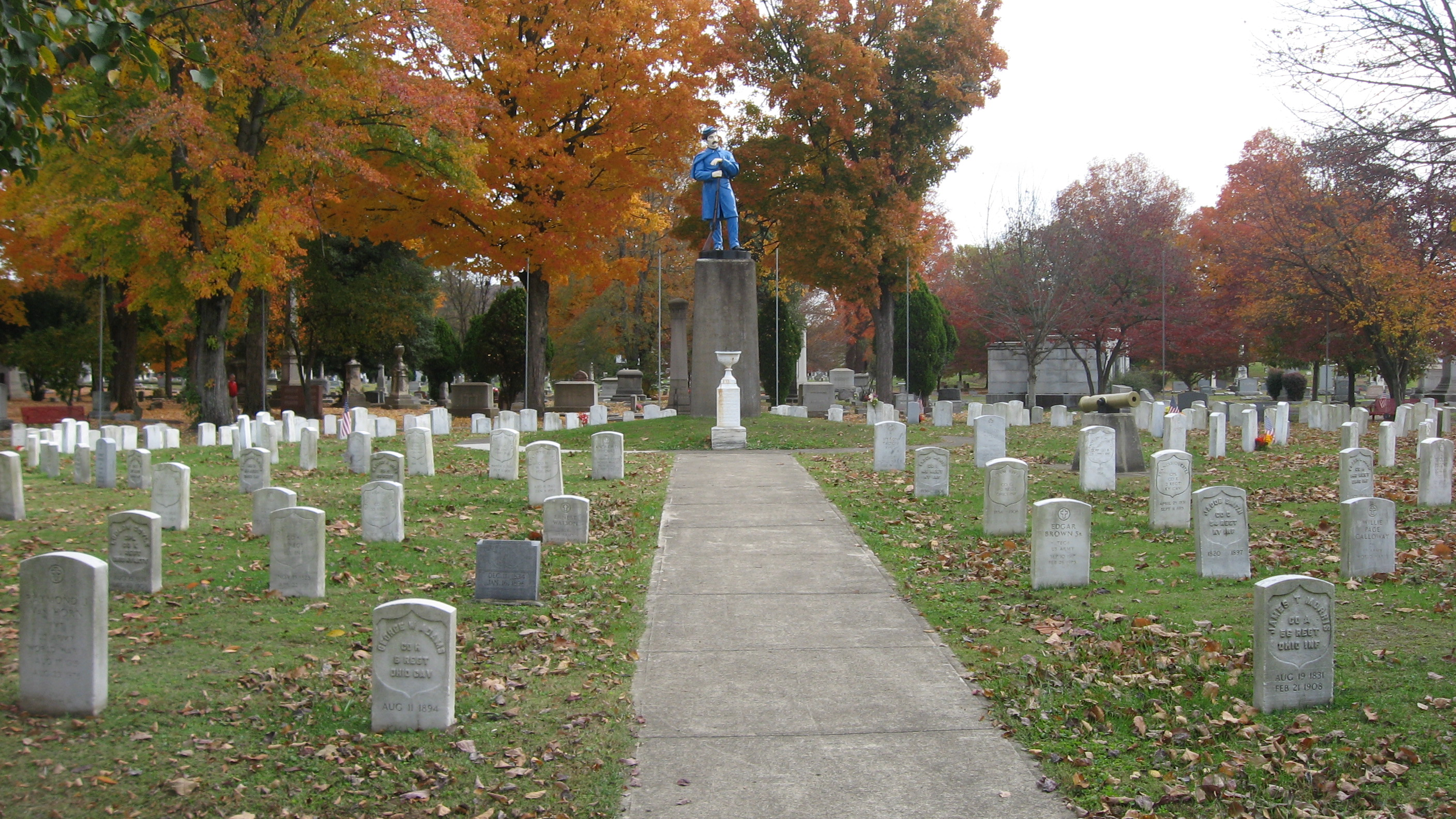
Greenlawn Cemetery

Portsmouth has 14 parks for residents and community use. These include Alexandria Park (Ohio and Scioto River confluence), Bannon Park (near Farley Square), Branch Rickey Park (on Williams Street near levee), Buckeye Park (near Branch Rickey Park), Cyndee Secrest Park (Sciotoville), Dr. Hartlage Park (Rose Street in Sciotoville), Labold Park (near Spartan Stadium), Larry Hisle Park (23rd Street & Thomas Ave.), Mound Park (17th & Hutchins Streets), York Park (riverfront), Spartan Stadium, Tracy Park (Chillicothe & Gay Streets), and Weghorst Park (Fourth & Jefferson Streets).

Portsmouth's Spock Community Dog Park (named after a K9 who died protecting his partner) is a recreational dog park that was implemented in 2019 to give people a place to walk their dogs and have leisure time.

A new skate-park, designed by Spohn Ranch Skateparks, is planned for construction in the near future.

=== Pools ===
The McKinley Swimming Pool, on Findley Street, was built during the Civil Rights era in memory of Eugene McKinley, a 14-year-old who drowned. Portsmouth's other pool in the area, that has long since closed, was owned by the Terrace Club, and was commonly referred to as the "Dreamland Pool" by community members. Yet, the Terrace Club's pool was still segregated despite the progress of the Civil Rights movement, which influenced Portsmouth's institutional makeup. With the African American community having nowhere to swim in the area despite institutional changes attempting to include Black people, a protest called the wade-in occurred at Dreamland Pool on July 17, 1964. The next summer, in 1965, the Board of Directors of the Terrace Club pool unanimously removed its ban on African Americans and reopened under the name Dreamland Pool. The McKinley Pool, which opened in 1966, still remains and represents Portsmouth's reform and the struggle against the laws of the Jim Crow Era.

=== Greenlawn Cemetery ===
Greenlawn Cemetery, established in 1829, is 40 acres in size and is Portsmouth's only public cemetery. It incorporates several smaller cemeteries, including City, Evergreen, Hebrew, Holy Redeemer, Hill North (Methodist), Hill South (Robinson), Old Mausoleum, Soldiers Circle, and St. Marys. The cemetery, which is maintained by the city, is at Offnere Street and Grant Street. The Greenlawn Cemetery Chapel, constructed in 1884, is listed on the National Register of Historic Places.

== Government ==
=== City government ===
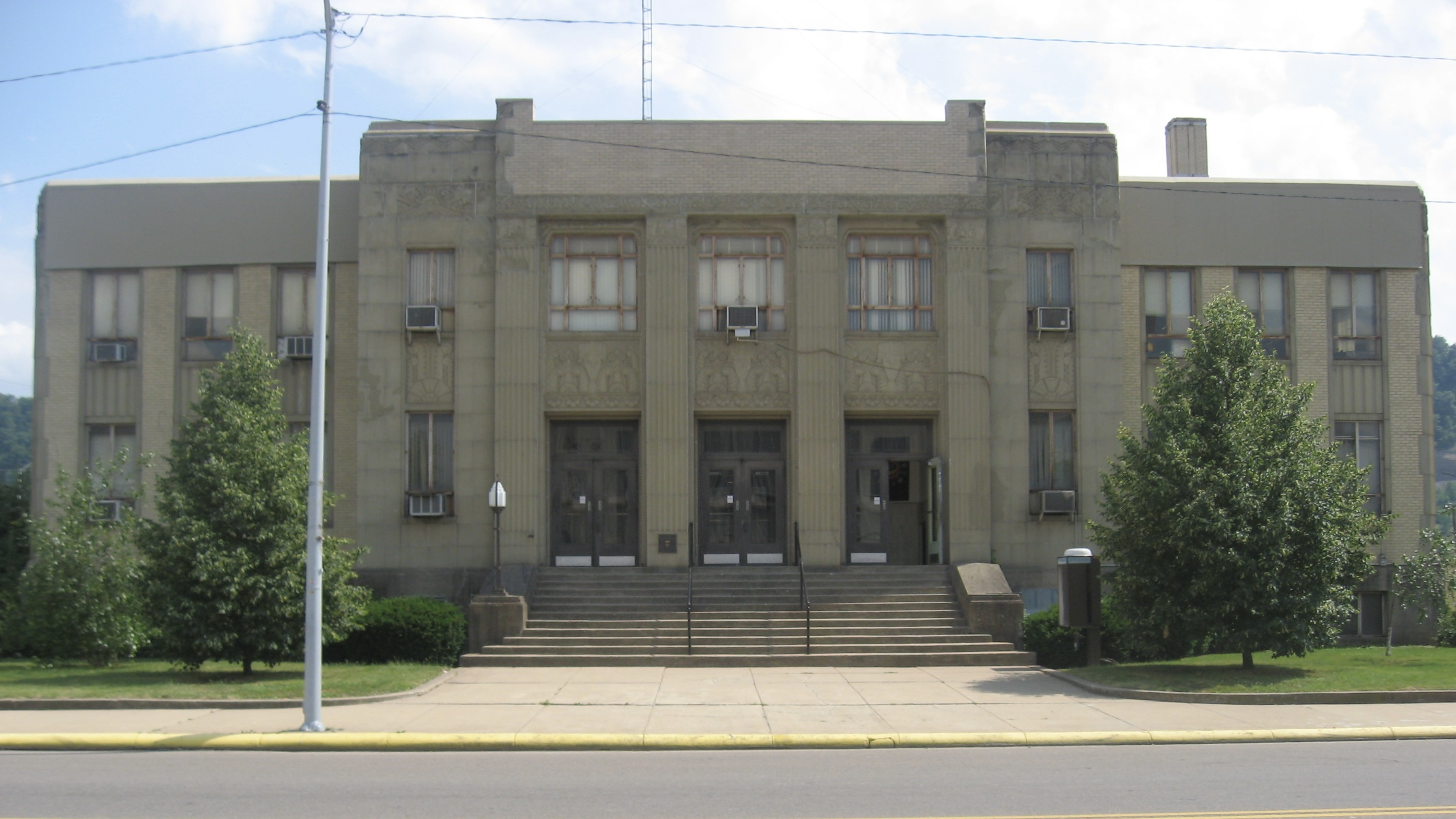
Portsmouth City Hall

The city charter was adopted on November 6, 1928. The city conducts business at City Hall, which was constructed in 1935. City council meetings are held in the second and fourth weeks of the month. The city reverted from being run by a city manager to a mayor in 1988, with the mayor elected every four years.

In 2012, voters approved returning to a Council/City Manager form of government; this took effect in 2014. Under the City Manager/Council system, the mayor and vice-mayor are elected members of the city council who are appointed to their positions by the council. The city manager is hired by and reports directly to the council. The city manager oversees the day-to-day operations of city government and is the direct supervisor of all city department heads. There are six wards in the city, with elections of council members from the wards every two years.

The City Manager is Sam Sutherland.

Ward	City Council
First Ward	David Malone
Second Ward	Charlotte Gordon (Mayor, City Council President)
Third Ward	Andy Cole
Fourth Ward	Lyvette Barnes-Mosley (Vice Mayor, City Council Vice-President)
Fifth Ward	Christopher Neff
Sixth Ward	Dennis Packard

=== County government ===
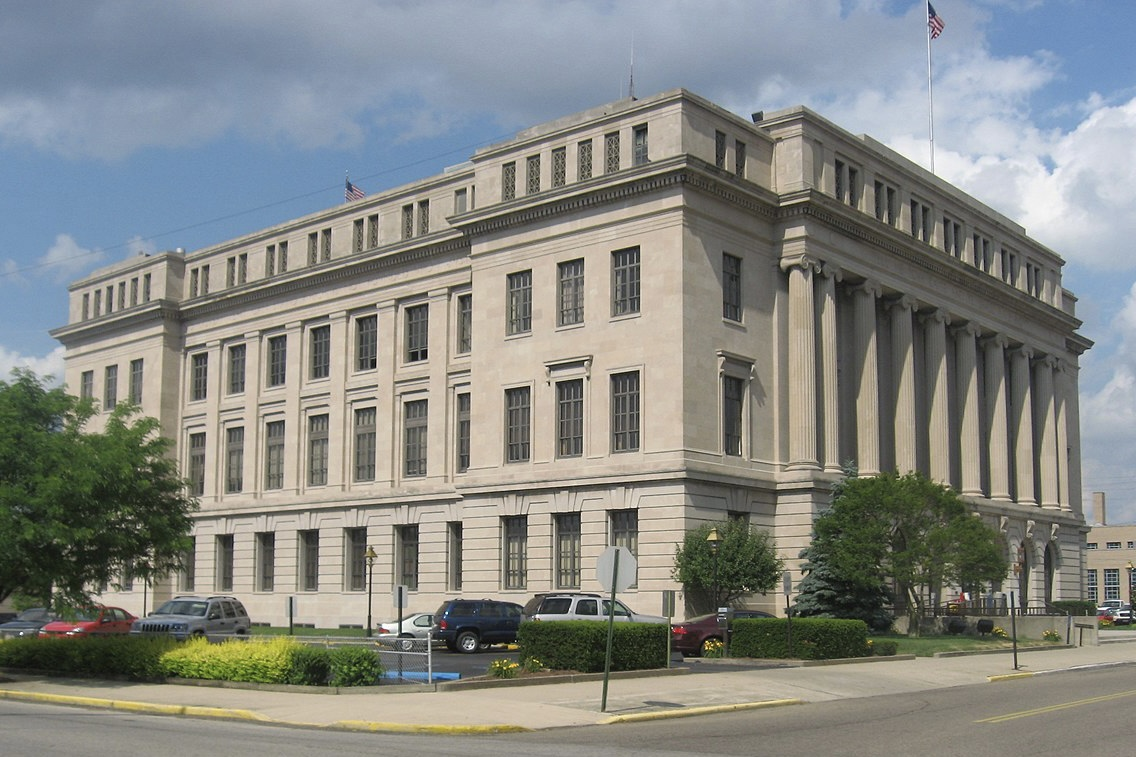
Scioto County Courthouse

Portsmouth is the county seat of Scioto County. The Scioto County Courthouse is at the corner of Sixth and Court Streets and was constructed in 1936. The sheriff's office and county jail, once in the courthouse, are in a facility constructed in 2006 at the former site of the Norfolk and Western rail depot near U.S. 23.

The county commissioners are Scottie Powell, chairman; Bryan K. Davis; and Cathy E. Coleman. The county commissioners meet twice weekly on Tuesdays and Thursdays at 9:30 AM in Room 107 on the first floor of the Scioto County Courthouse.

=== Response to the opioid epidemic ===
In the late 1990s, an opioid epidemic of prescription drug abuse swept the region. This caused an accelerated increase in social instability and crime. One of the most prevalent drugs was oxycodone, a synthetic opiate known colloquially as oxy.

In May 2011, the Ohio Senate and House unanimously passed a bill cracking down on pill mills (signed into law by John Kasich) authored by Portsmouth's state representative Terry Johnson. Shortly thereafter, the DEA and state and local law enforcement agencies worked to identify and shut down a pharmacy and several doctors who had prescribed hundreds of thousands of opiates over a two-year period by suspending their license to practice medicine.

In a 2019 investigative story, The Washington Post reported that fentanyl was replacing oxycodone as the preferred opioid.

== Education ==
=== Postsecondary ===
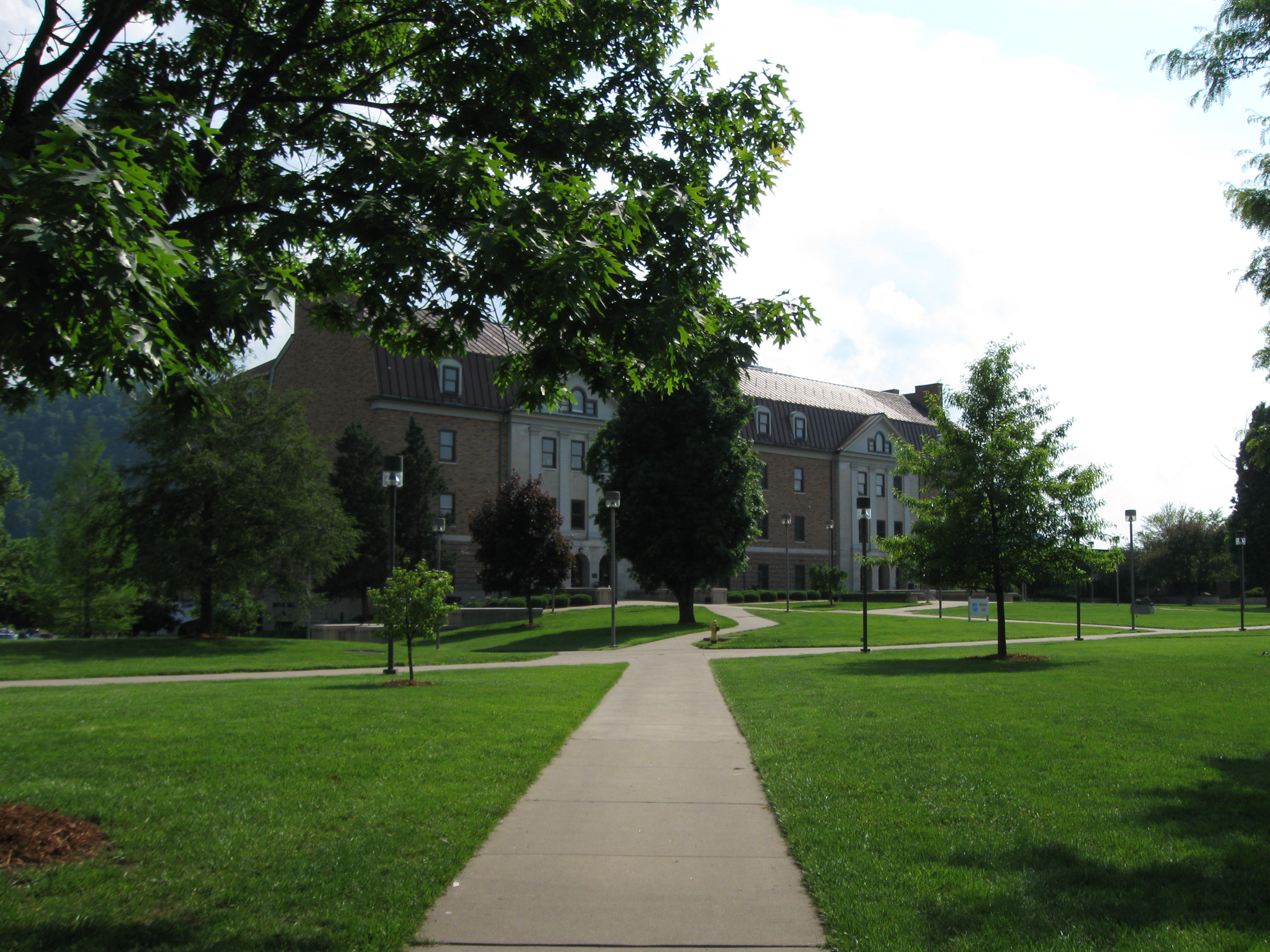
Massie Hall, Shawnee State University campus

Shawnee State University is a public university and the southernmost member of the University System of Ohio. In 1945, Ohio University established an academic center in Portsmouth. In 1986, a legislative charter introduced by Vern Riffe to establish Shawnee State University was signed into law by Governor Richard Celeste. Shawnee State University offers associate's and bachelor's degrees in a variety of disciplines. Other majors are nursing, business administration, sociology, biology, and psychology. Seven master's degrees and a doctorate are also offered. SSU also has student and faculty exchange programs with several overseas institutions, including the Jaume I University in Spain, Al Akhawayn University in Morocco, Zhejiang University of Technology in China, and the Ludwigsburg University of Education in Germany. SSU serves almost 3,000 matriculated undergraduates, as well as several hundred grad and post grad students.

Located in downtown Portsmouth, SSU has a 62-acre campus. Its 28 buildings include the Vern Riffe Center for the Arts, Clyde W. Clark Planetarium, Morris University Center, and James A. Rhodes Athletic Center. The university's library was named the Clark Memorial Library in 1997. Clark Planetarium features the Hubble Space Telescope Viewspace system. The university has on-campus housing for 934 students. All first-year students must live in university housing unless they are married, veterans, over age 23, or living with their parents.

The Shawnee State "Bears" are part of the National Association of Intercollegiate Athletics (NAIA), competing in the Mid-South Conference (MSC) since the 2010 The Bears compete in 13 intercollegiate varsity sports, including baseball, basketball, cross country, golf, soccer, tennis, track and field, and volleyball. In 2021, the men's basketball team defeated Lewis–Clark State to become NAIA national champions.

Clubs on campus include the Art Club, Chemistry Club, Fantanime, Geology Club, History Club, International Game Developer's Association (IGDA), Political Science Club, Pre-Med Club, Sexuality and Gender Acceptance (SAGA), and an international group, the Other World Society. Since 2008, except during the COVID-19 lockdown, the Zombie Education Defense club has hosted a semi-annual, campus-wide, week-long game of nerf tag, the Humans vs. Zombies event.

=== Primary and secondary ===
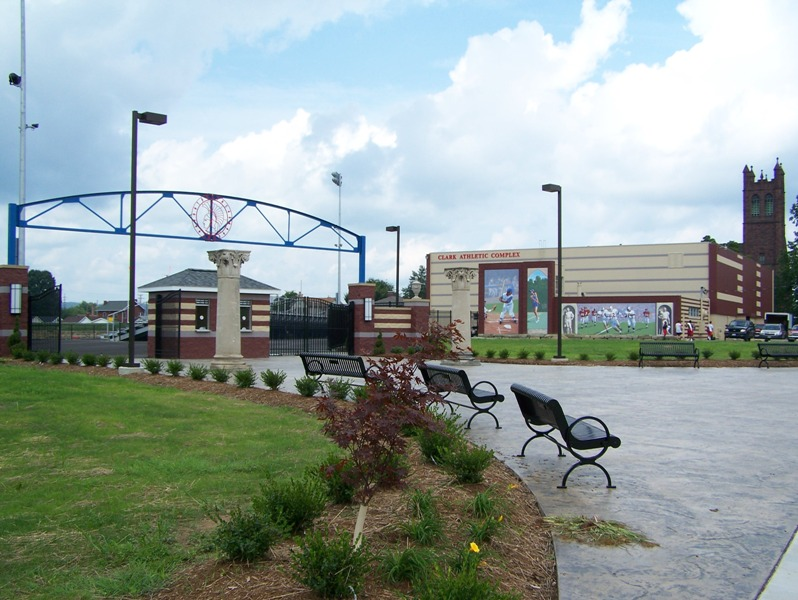
Clark Athletic Complex

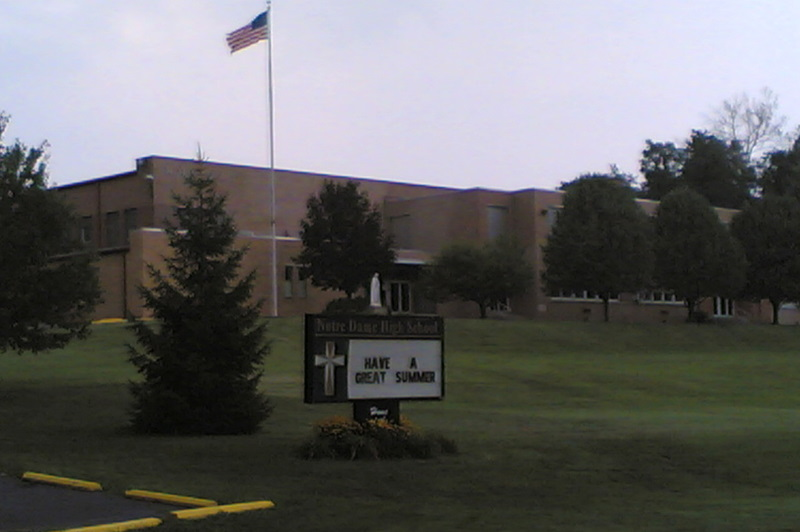
Portsmouth Notre Dame High School

Public schools include Portsmouth High School, founded in the 1830s.

A new school opened in 2007.

In 2009, the school system completed construction of 25-acre (10 ha) Clark Athletic Complex.

Notre Dame High School is a Catholic school opened in 1852.

== Media ==
Portsmouth is near the dividing line for several television markets, including Columbus, Cincinnati, and Huntington-Charleston. There are two local television stations, WTZP-LD, an America One affiliate, and WQCW, a CW affiliate. Until October 2017, Portsmouth was served by WPBO, a PBS affiliate. Programs aired on WPBO were broadcast by WOSU in Columbus. Local radio stations WIOI, WKSG, WNXT, WPYK, WZZZ, and WOSP-FM serve the city.

Portsmouth is also served by three newspapers. The Portsmouth Daily Times is the city's only daily newspaper. The Community Common is a free biweekly newspaper and the Scioto Voice is a weekly newspaper mailed to subscribers. The University Chronicle is the student-led newspaper at Shawnee State University.

== Infrastructure ==
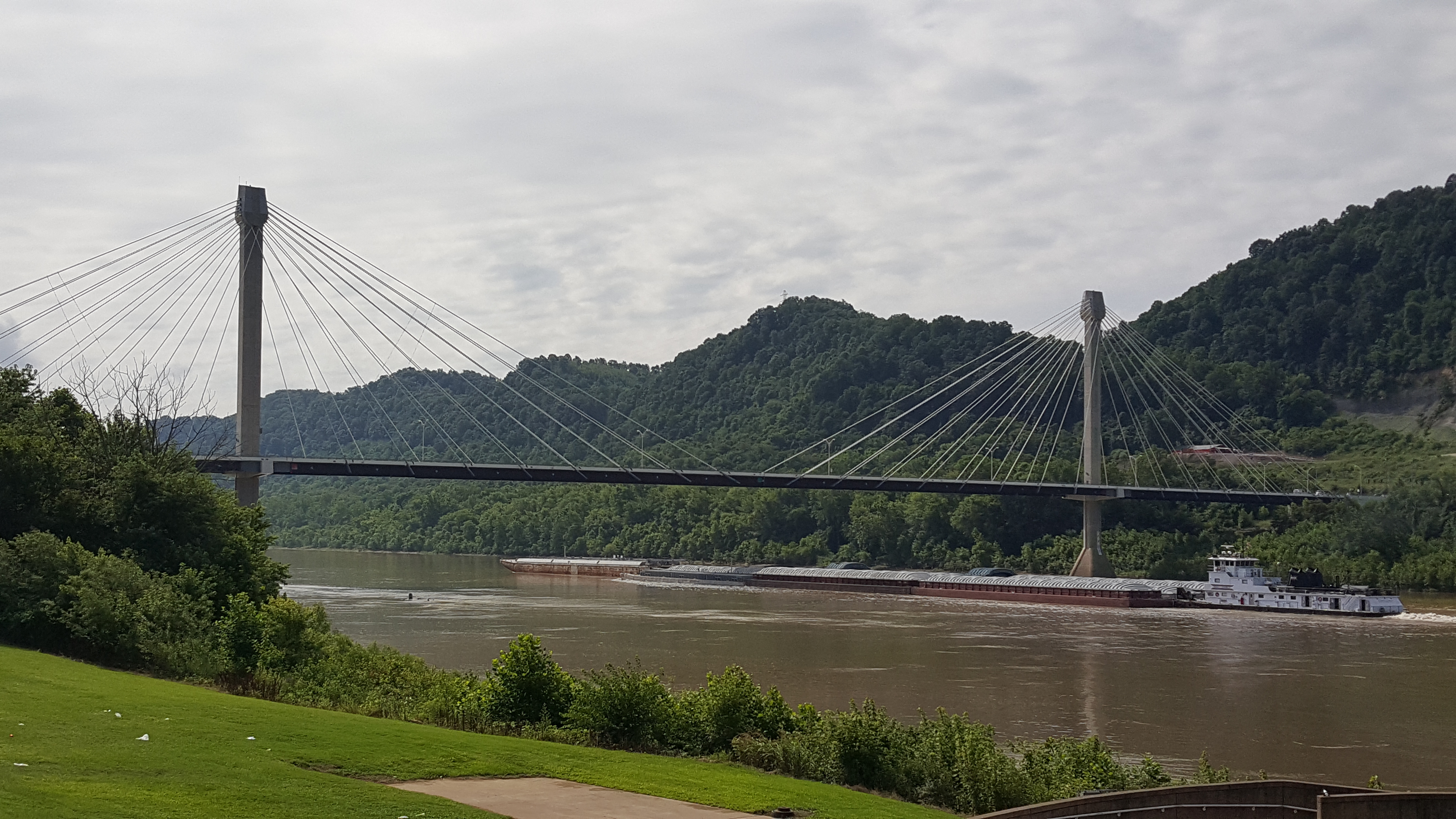
The U.S. Grant Bridge crossing the Ohio River from Portsmouth to Greenup County, Kentucky.

=== Air ===
The Greater Portsmouth Regional Airport is located ten nautical miles (12 mi; 19 km) northeast of Portsmouth's central business district. The nearest commercial airport is Tri-State Airport (HTS) in Ceredo, West Virginia, about 3 miles (4.8 km) outside Huntington, West Virginia, and 53 miles (85 km) southeast of Portsmouth.

=== Highways ===
Portsmouth is served by two major U.S. Routes: 23 and 52. Other significant roads include Ohio State Routes 73, 104, 139, 140, and 335. The nearest Interstate highway is I-64. Interstate 73 is planned to use the newly built Portsmouth bypass (i.e., Ohio State Route 823) from North Carolina o Michigan. The I-74 Extension is planned to use US 52 through Portsmouth, running concurrently with I-73 on the eastern side of Portsmouth.

=== Public transportation ===
Public transportation for Portsmouth and its outlying areas is offered through Access Scioto County (ASC).

=== Rail ===
Portsmouth is an important location in the Norfolk Southern Railway network. Norfolk Southern operates a railyard and locomotive maintenance facility for its long-distance shipping route between the coalfields of West Virginia and points east, to the Great Lakes. Competitor CSX Transportation operates a former Chesapeake & Ohio Railway line just east of the city in Sciotoville, which crosses the Ohio River on the historic Sciotoville Bridge. Amtrak offers passenger service to the Portsmouth area on its Cardinal route between New York City and Chicago. The passenger station is on CSX Transportation-owned track in South Shore, Kentucky, across the Ohio River from Portsmouth.

== Sister cities ==
Portsmouth has three sister cities, as designated by Sister Cities International:

- – Great Corby, England, United Kingdom
- – Orizaba, Mexico
- – Zittau, Sachsen, Germany

== See also ==
- List of cities and towns along the Ohio River
