= Herb Roe =

American painter

- Born: 1974 (age 51–52); Portsmouth, Ohio, US
- Education: Apprenticeship to Robert Dafford
- Known for: Oil painting, Murals

Herb Roe (born 1974) is a painter of large-scale outdoor murals and classical realist oil paintings. After attending the Columbus College of Art and Design in Columbus, Ohio for a short time, he apprenticed to mural artist Robert Dafford. After 15 years with Dafford Murals, Roe left to pursue his own art career. He currently resides in Lafayette, Louisiana.

== Biography ==
Roe was in born 1974 in Portsmouth, Ohio. He spent his childhood across the Ohio River in Greenup County, Kentucky, but moved to Portsmouth while in his teens. In 1992 he received a scholarship to the Columbus College of Art and Design in Columbus, Ohio and attended his freshman year there in 1992 to 1993.

In the summer of 1993 he met the Louisiana mural artist Robert Dafford when he started a mural project in Portsmouth. Roe subsequently apprenticed to and worked for Dafford for 15 years. During that time Roe worked on Dafford mural projects in Portsmouth, Ohio; Paducah, Maysville, and Covington, Kentucky, New Orleans, Louisiana; Vicksburg, Mississippi; and Pine Bluff, Arkansas.

Subjects painted by Roe as a Dafford muralist include Native American history, early settlers such as Daniel Boone and Simon Kenton, Carnegie Libraries, industries such as river barges and hospitals, labor unions, African-American heritage, and local notables such as Rosemary Clooney. In May 2003 he was photographed painting the Lewis and Clark Expedition mural in Paducah by photographer Jim Roshan as part of the America 24/7 project. The image was used in Roshan's book Kentucky24/7 published in 2004. Roe was the only Dafford muralist to work on all of the Paducah murals, completing several of them entirely by himself.

In 2007 Roe left Dafford Murals to pursue his own commissions and devote more time to his own artwork under the name ChromeSun Productions. In 2009 he collaborated with Dafford on a poster project for the Zydeco Cajun Prairie Scenic Byway, in which he did the preliminary digital painting for the design. The year-long project highlights many local spots of interest.

In 2010, Roe painted two new murals in Paducah and Vicksburg. In July, he painted Evening Roll Call in Paducah, a mural depicting the 100-year history of local Boy Scouts of America Troop 1. The mural was dedicated on National Scouting Sunday February 6, 2011 with a parade and other festivities. In the fall of 2010, Roe teamed up with another former Dafford muralist, Benny Graeff, to paint the 55-foot "Run Thru History" mural in Vicksburg, Mississippi. Roe's current artwork focuses on the traditional southwestern Louisiana Cajun celebration of the Courir de Mardi Gras. It is a series of hyper-realistic depictions of costumed celebrants playing music, dancing on the backs of horses, and chasing after chickens.

== Work ==
=== Techniques and style ===
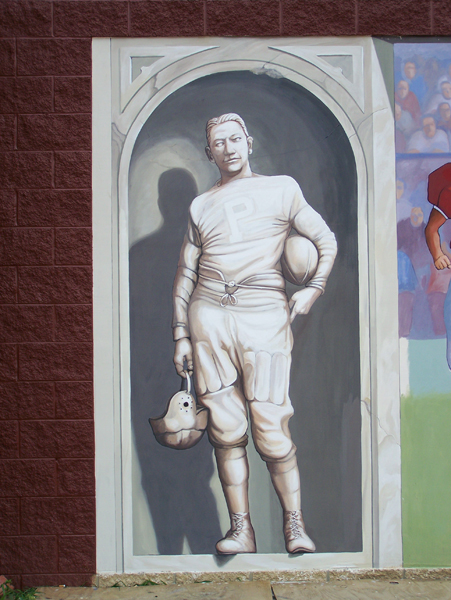
Mural detail on Clark Athletic Complex

Roe conducts extensive research to develop his works and shows acute attention to detail. They are typically started as Adobe Photoshop sketches, often based on models and surroundings he has lighted and digitally photographed. His compositions are often influenced by classical art, and he cites European artists of the sixteenth and seventeenth century Michelangelo, Peter Paul Rubens, and Caravaggio as major influences. For his historical murals, he will often pick a particular artist or illustrator from the time period he is depicting to emulate; thereby he can stylistically invoke the era. After the composition is decided upon, he transfers it to the painting surface either by scaling the design and doing a grid transfer or with an overhead projector. He paints the murals either with industrial acrylic enamels or the longer lasting silicate mineral paints. His oil paintings are done in a classical realist style, and subjects include portraiture, photo-realist abstract compositions, and historical illustration. These oil paintings may contain from three to 20 layers, from underpainting to the final colored glazes.

Roe also does conservation work on murals.

=== Exhibits ===
- In 2002 Roe was part of an exhibition with artist Wayne Ditch at the Cite des Arts in Lafayette, Louisiana during the Festival International de Louisiane.
- In 2008 he was included in the Acadiana Center for the Arts "Southern Open", an annual juried show open to residents of Texas, Louisiana, Mississippi, Alabama and Florida. The juror for the show that year was Peter Frank.
- Solo Exhibit at the A.I.R. Studio in Paducah, Kentucky in September 2009.
- Masks & Mayhem – The Courir de Mardi Gras: An exhibit of Roe's oil paintings and graphite drawings of the traditional Cajun Courir de Mardi Gras during February 2012.

=== Murals ===
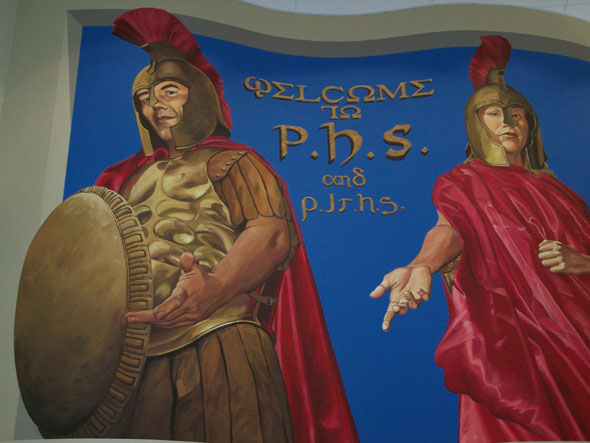
Mural in entry way at Portsmouth High School

- In 2006 Roe completed three murals in the new Portsmouth High School. The murals depicted the previous high school building (now demolished), school mascot Trojans welcoming new students into the building, and an indoor sports-themed mural at the entrance to the gymnasium.
- In 2009 Roe completed three sports-themed murals on the new Clark Athletic Complex in Portsmouth, Ohio. The murals depict the three sports played at the new facility: a baseball game, tennis match, and football game.
- In the summer of 2010 Roe added a new mural to the Paducah Wall to Wall Project, showing the 100-year history of the local Boy Scout troop. Troop 1 is one of only a handful of troops who share their centennial with the centennial of the national scouting organization itself. The dedication for the mural was held on National Scout Sunday, February 6, 2011.
- Roe teamed up with Benny Graeff, a fellow former Dafford muralist, to paint the 55-foot long "Run thru History" mural in Vicksburg, Mississippi in the fall of 2010 . The mural is located across the street from the Vicksburg Riverfront Murals Project on Grove Hill. The mural's subject matter is the annual 10k run through the Vicksburg National Military Park, and it shows several prominent monuments from the park.

== Gallery ==
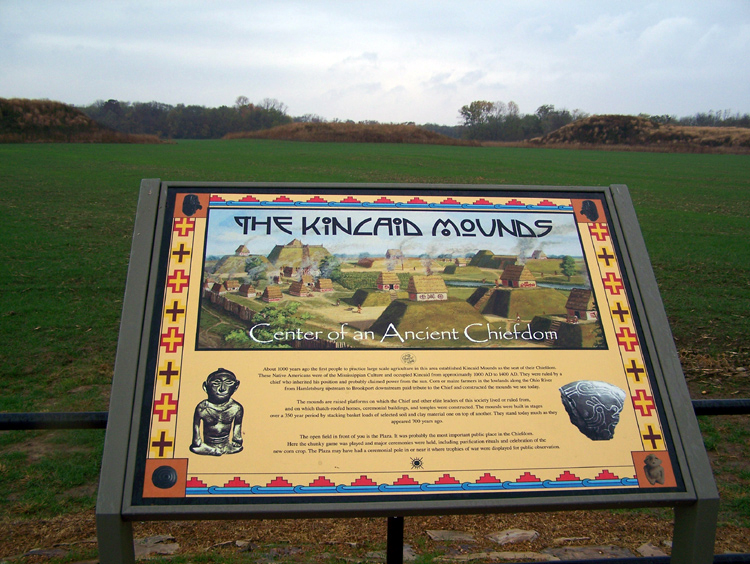
Herb Roe painting of the Kincaid Mounds State Historic Site used at the site

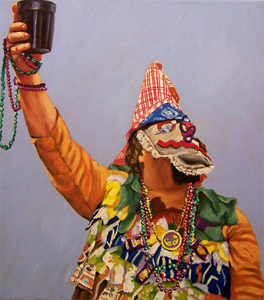
Oil painting of a Courir de Mardi Gras

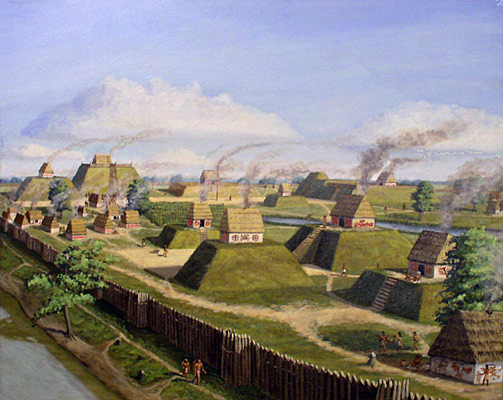
The Kincaid Site in Massac County, Illinois. Oil on canvas painting
