= Portsmouth High School (Ohio) =

Location
- 1225 Gallia Street; Portsmouth, Ohio 45652; United States; 38.7360°N 82.9884°W

Information
- Type: Public high school
- Established: c. 1830s
- School district: Portsmouth City School District
- NCES School ID: 391002701544
- Principal: Angel King
- Staff: 45.30 (on an FTE basis)
- Grades: 7-12
- Enrollment: 636 (2024-2025)
- Student to teacher ratio: 14.04
- Colors: Blue and red
- Athletics conference: Ohio Valley Conference
- Team name: Trojans
- Website: www.portsmouthtrojans.org/o/phs

Portsmouth High School (PHS) is a public high school in Portsmouth, Ohio, United States. It is the only high school in the Portsmouth City School District. Athletic teams are known as the Trojans, and they compete in the Ohio High School Athletic Association as a member of the Ohio Valley Conference.

== History ==
Portsmouth High School was founded sometime in the 1830s and serves students in grades 7th through 12th. In 2000, Portsmouth voters passed a school bond issue, which helped construct new schools for the district. Portsmouth's new schools opened for the 2006–2007 school year.

Portsmouth won the Grand Prize from School Planning & Management's 2007 Education Design Showcase, an award given annually to the K-12 school that displays "excellence in design and functional planning directed toward meeting the needs of the educational program."

Portsmouth built a $10 million athletic complex in 2009, that included a new football field, baseball field, softball field, and track.

== Athletics ==
Portsmouth High School currently offers:

- Baseball
- Basketball
- Cross country
- Cheerleading
- Football
- Golf
- Softball
- Swimming and diving
- Tennis
- Track and field
- Volleyball

=== State championships ===
- Boys basketball – 1931, 1961, 1978, 1988
- Girls basketball – 2025, 2026

==== OHSAA Final Four appearances ====
Boys' basketball – 1925, 1926, 1927, 1929, 1931, 1934, 1939, 1941, 1961, 1978, 1980, 1988, 1990, 2011, 2012

== Notable alumni ==
- Henry T. Bannon - former Ohio politician
- Kathleen Battle - opera star
- Gerald Cadogan - former professional football player in the National Football League (NFL)
- Bill Harsha - former Ohio politician
- Larry Hisle - former professional baseball player in the Major League Baseball (MLB)
- Rocky Nelson - former professional baseball player in the Major League Baseball (MLB)
- Al Oliver - former professional baseball player in the Major League Baseball (MLB)
- Del Rice - former professional baseball player in the Major League Baseball (MLB)
- Barbara Robinson - author of The Best Christmas Pageant Ever
- Herb Roe - mural artist
