= Robert Dafford =

American artist

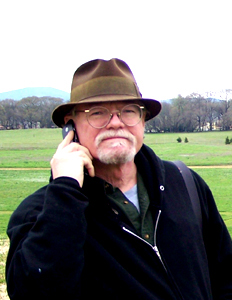
Robert Dafford's Picture

Robert Dafford (born May 14, 1951) is one of the most prolific American muralists currently working.

== Life and work ==
Robert Dafford is a current resident of Lafayette, Louisiana. He has painted over 500 works of public art across the United States, Canada, France, Belgium, and England. He has been painting murals, signs, and fine art paintings for over 50 years.

In recent decades, Dafford has concentrated on working along the Ohio River, painting over two hundred large historical images of cities on their floodwalls, using trompe-l'œil, advanced perspective, and realist technique. Many riverboat tours make stops along the Ohio River specifically to see his murals. Dafford is best known for his murals in Paducah, Kentucky; Portsmouth, Ohio; and Covington, Kentucky. His giant Clarinet in New Orleans, and his depictions of the History of the Acadians are also among his notable works.

The more than 70 consecutive Portsmouth murals are over 20 feet (6.1 m) tall and stretch over 2,000 feet (610 m). Dafford's murals have been commissioned as public art projects that help to boost downtown development and pride in small communities. In 2009 he collaborated with former longtime employee Herb Roe on a poster project for the Zydeco Cajun Prairie Scenic Byway. The year-long project highlights many spots of interest in the three-parish region.
