= South Shore, Kentucky =

- City
- Location of South Shore in Greenup County, Kentucky.
- Coordinates: 38°43′18″N 82°57′49″W
- Country: United States
- State: Kentucky
- County: Greenup
- Incorporated: July 2, 1957

Government
  - Type: City Commission
  - Mayor: Vacant

Area
  - Total: 0.85 sq mi (2.20 km^{2})
  - Land: 0.66 sq mi (1.70 km^{2})
  - Water: 0.19 sq mi (0.50 km^{2})
- Elevation: 545 ft (166 m)

Population (2020)
  - Total: 1,066
  - Density: 1,623.7/sq mi (626.91/km^{2})
- Time zone: UTC-5 (Eastern (EST))
  - Summer (DST): UTC-4 (EDT)
- ZIP Code: 41175
- Area code: 606
- FIPS code: 21-72210
- GNIS feature ID: 0503976

South Shore is a home rule-class city in Greenup County, Kentucky, United States. As of the 2020 census, South Shore had a population of 1,066. It is located along the Ohio River across from Portsmouth, Ohio, at the mouth of Tygarts Creek. South Shore is a part of the Huntington-Ashland, WV-KY-OH, Metropolitan Statistical Area (MSA).

The South Portsmouth–South Shore station serves Amtrak's Cardinal Trains 50 & 51.

== History ==
South Shore was first settled in 1890 by the Fullerton, Warnock, and the Morton families from the nearby Tygarts Valley. Significant development occurred after the coming of the Chesapeake and Ohio Railway and George D. Winn's ferry to Portsmouth, Ohio, in the 1890s. Winn began to petition for a post office in 1893, and on July 21 the post office was established as "Fullerton", after his brothers Harvey and Harrison Fullerton. The town was incorporated for a short period during 1919.

In 1895, the Taylor brickyard was established near Fullerton by Clyde King and became the area's top employer. The Taylor name was applied to both the local railway station and the nearby McCall post office on January 16, 1930. This post office was then renamed "South Shore" on February 4, 1940. Shortly after the city of South Shore was incorporated on July 2, 1957, the Fullerton and South Shore post offices were consolidated under the South Shore name. South Shore eventually annexed the entire city of Fullerton, significantly expanding its boundaries.

== Geography ==
South Shore is located in northern Greenup County at 38°43′18″N 82°57′49″W (38.721577, -82.963606), on the south bank of the Ohio River. U.S. Route 23 passes through the city limits, leading southeast 16 miles (26 km) to Greenup, the county seat, and 29 miles (47 km) to Ashland. To the west, US-23 leads 2 miles (3 km) to the south end of the U.S. Grant Bridge, which carries the highway across the Ohio River into Portsmouth.

According to the United States Census Bureau, the city of South Shore has a total area of 0.85 square miles (2.2 km^{2}), of which 0.66 square miles (1.7 km^{2}) is land and 0.19 square miles (0.5 km^{2}), or 22.79%, is water.

== Demographics ==
Historical population
| Census | Pop. | Note | %± |
|---|---|---|---|
| 1960 | 658 | | — |
| 1970 | 1,750 | | 166.0% |
| 1980 | 1,525 | | −12.9% |
| 1990 | 1,318 | | −13.6% |
| 2000 | 1,226 | | −7.0% |
| 2010 | 1,122 | | −8.5% |
| 2020 | 1,066 | | −5.0% |
U.S. Decennial Census

As of the census of 2000, there were 1,226 people, 539 households, and 335 families residing in the city. The population density was 1,916.9 inhabitants per square mile (740.1/km^{2}). There were 605 housing units at an average density of 945.9 per square mile (365.2/km^{2}). The racial makeup of the city was 97.55% White, 0.16% African American, 0.57% Native American, 0.08% Asian, 0.24% from other races, and 1.39% from two or more races. Hispanic or Latino of any race were 0.24% of the population.

There were 539 households, out of which 29.3% had children under the age of 18 living with them, 44.0% were married couples living together, 15.2% had a female householder with no husband present, and 37.7% were non-families. 34.7% of all households were made up of individuals, and 19.9% had someone living alone who was 65 years of age or older. The average household size was 2.17 and the average family size was 2.80.

In the city, the population was spread out, with 23.2% under the age of 18, 8.7% from 18 to 24, 24.9% from 25 to 44, 21.2% from 45 to 64, and 21.9% who were 65 years of age or older. The median age was 39 years. For every 100 females, there were 74.1 males. For every 100 females age 18 and over, there were 70.5 males.

The median income for a household in the city was $18,214, and the median income for a family was $25,197. Males had a median income of $23,036 versus $20,833 for females. The per capita income for the city was $12,161. About 22.4% of families and 25.7% of the population were below the poverty line, including 35.3% of those under age 18 and 16.3% of those age 65 or over.

== Economy ==
South Shore is the home of Graf Brothers Flooring and Lumber, the largest manufacturer of rift and quartered oak products in the world. Graf Bros employs approximately 275 people, mainly an immigrant workforce.

== Attractions ==
The Indian Head Rock, an 8-ton boulder known for its historic carvings of names and initials of individuals from the 19th and early 20th centuries, is now displayed in an enclosure in Rotary Park.(update is now in South Shore, at the park near the postal office)

Rotary Park is a city park where events, such as an annual quilt festival, are held.

== Education ==
The city is served by McKell Elementary School and McKell Middle School. Both schools are located just outside the South Shore city limits and are part of the Greenup County School District. High school students from South Shore attend Greenup County High School, located approximately 13 miles from South Shore in Lloyd. The McKell Branch of the Greenup County Public Library is also located just outside the city limits next to McKell Middle School.

== See also ==
- List of cities and towns along the Ohio River
- Greenup County High School
