= Boneyfiddle Commercial District =

Historic district in Ohio, United States

- U.S. National Register of Historic Places
- U.S. Historic district
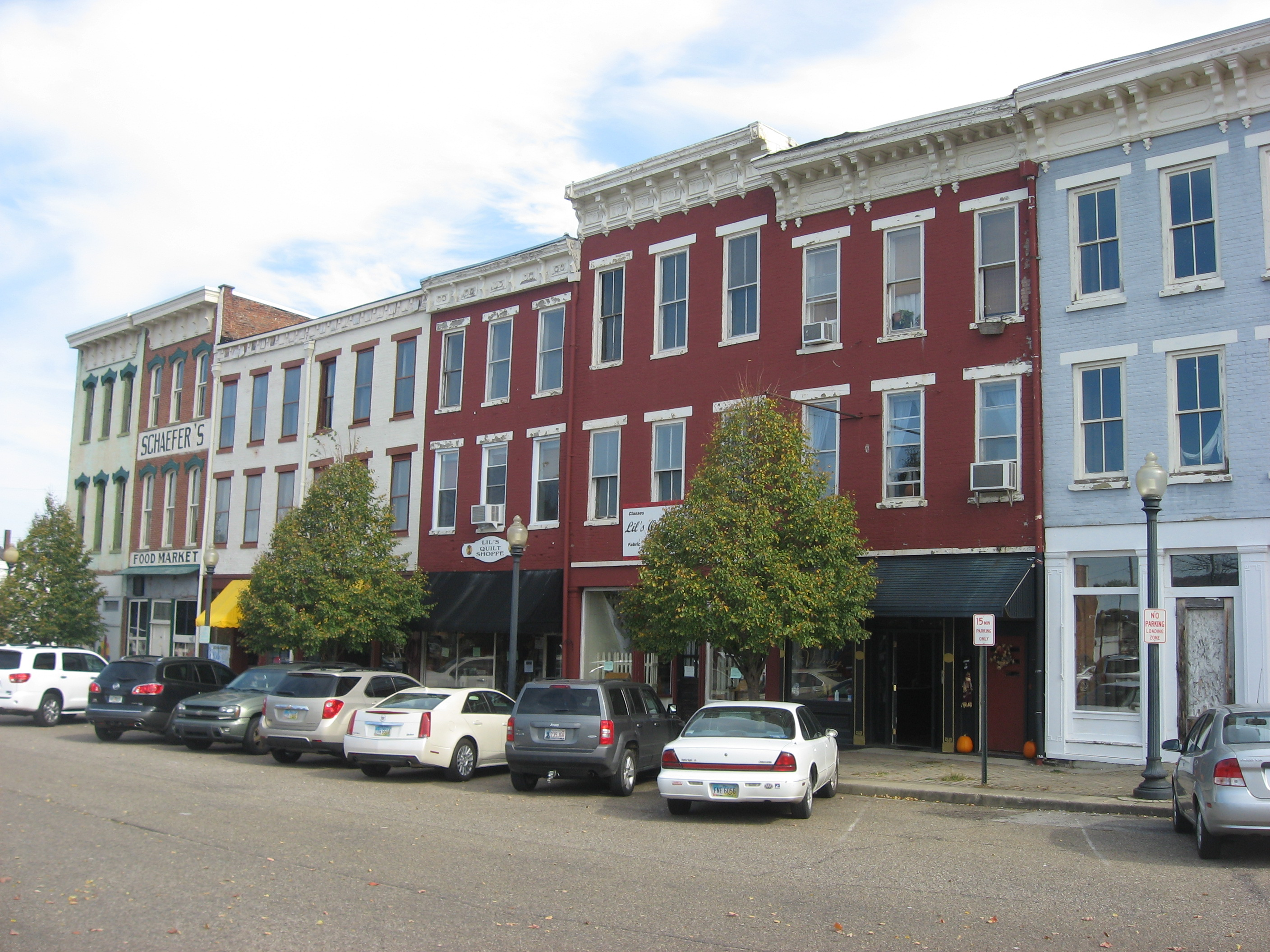
- Market Street in the district

- Location within Ohio Location within the United States
- Location: Roughly bounded by Front, Washington, 3rd and Scioto Sts., Portsmouth, Ohio
- Coordinates: 38°43′53″N 82°59′49″W
- Area: 35 acres (14 ha)
- Built: 1832
- Architectural style: Greek Revival, Italianate, Federal
- NRHP reference No.: 79001938
- Added to NRHP: June 6, 1979

Boneyfiddle Commercial District is a neighborhood and historic district in Portsmouth, Ohio, United States. Also known as the Historic Boneyfiddle District, it is located at the confluence of the Scioto and Ohio rivers on Second Street and is bounded roughly by Front, Washington, 3rd and Scioto streets. The community was founded by German immigrants in the mid-19th century and was developed during the booming industrial economy of the late 19th and early 20th centuries.

On June 6, 1979, the Boneyfiddle Commercial District was added to the National Register of Historic Places.

== See also ==
- National Register of Historic Places listings in Scioto County, Ohio
