= Graf Brothers Flooring and Lumber =

Rift and quarter sawn oak product manufacturer

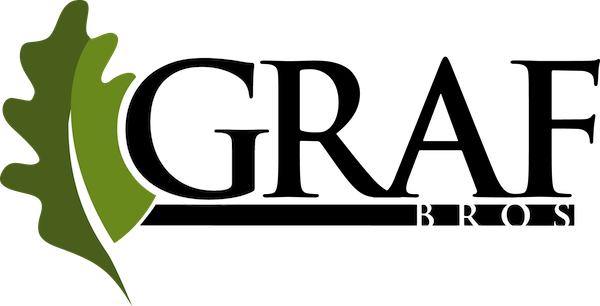
- Type: Private
- Industry: Manufacturing, Basic Materials
- Founded: 2003
- Headquarters: South Shore, KY
- Key people: David Graf, President
- Products: Hardwood Flooring and Lumber
- Owner: David Graf; Greg Graf
- Number of employees: 275
- Website: www.grafbro.com

Graf Brothers Flooring and Lumber specializes in, and is the world's largest manufacturer of, rift and quarter sawn oak products. Rift & Quartered lumber results from a unique way of sawing that maximizes the yield of lumber with vertical grain. Vertical grain is preferred because of its excellent technical properties. Lumber that has been sawed using this method expands evenly and vertically. Vertical grain also increases the structural integrity of the wood.

Graf Bros produces 125,000 board feet (290 m^{3}) of lumber and 35,000 square feet (3,300 m^{2}) of flooring per day. The company maintains 2.5 million board foot (5,900 m^{3}) of logs, 5 million board foot (12,000 m^{3}) of lumber and 750,000 square feet (70,000 m^{2}) of flooring in inventory, including stocks at four West Coast warehouses. Graf Brothers sells approximately half of its lumber to distribution yards and flooring and millwork manufacturers, and the other half goes into its own flooring production. Graf Bros maintains lumber inventory at four different warehouses on the West Coast. The company's flooring is shipped to distributors in Europe, Japan, and Asia, as well as 260 flooring distributors in North America. Graf Brothers also has a sales office in Brussels, Belgium.

Graf Brothers' headquarters and main sales office is a site of 70 acres (30 ha) in South Shore, Kentucky. This area houses a log yard of 5 acres (2 ha) that can hold up to 3 million board foot (7,100 m^{3}) of logs under water, an ultra high-tech band mill, 18 kilns capable of drying 2 million board foot (4,700 m^{3}) of lumber per month, a Walnut steamer, several warehouses, and two state-of-the-art computerized rip lines for manufacturing ripped-to-width lumber and flooring blanks. All of these facilities have been built since the site was acquired in 2003. Graf Brothers also operates satellite log yards in Vanceburg, Kentucky, and Prichard, West Virginia. In addition to its own mill, Graf Brothers is supplied by two dedicated contract sawmills, Brown Brothers Lumber in Otway, Ohio, and Redoutey Lumber in Henley, Ohio. The flooring is molded exclusively by Graf Brothers at its South Shore, Kentucky plant.

Graf Bros partakes in two practices that are unique to the lumber and flooring industries. The first is the production of "Monster Boards", which are boards with width offerings ranging from 9 to 32 inches (23 to 81 cm). The second unique practice is offering sorted or fixed widths in rift and quarter sawn lumber in almost any width the customer wants.

On December 30, 2017, a fire broke out in its main lumber storage facility. The 75,000 sq ft (6,968 m^{2}) building was deemed a total loss.
